= List of fictional princesses =

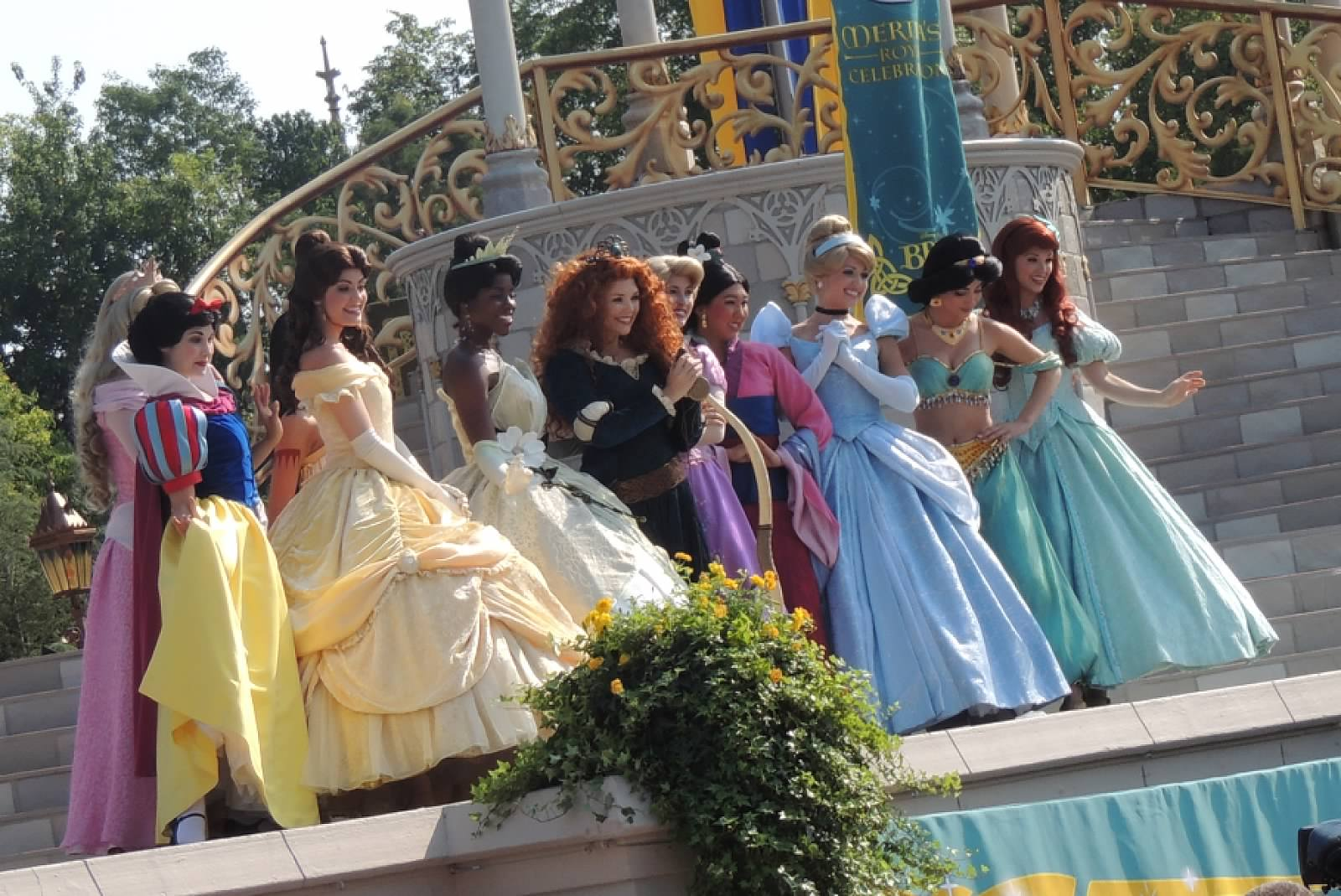
The Disney Princesses at the Magic Kingdom in Walt Disney World.

This is a list of fictional princesses that have appeared in various works of fiction. This list is organized by medium and limited to well-referenced, notable examples of fictional princesses.

== Literature ==
This section contains examples of both classic and modern writing.

Princess	Work	Notes	Author
al-Nadirah	Hatra legend	Recorded in early Islamic literature.	
Princess Eilonwy	The Chronicles of Prydain	She is the princess of Llyr.	Lloyd Alexander
Queen Irene	Xanth	Formerly Princess Irene, she is also the Sorceress of Plants. She is King Trent and Queen Iris's daughter, Dor's wife, and Ivy, Ida, and Dolph's mother. She appears in Centaur Aisle.	Piers Anthony
Princess Ivy	Xanth	Sorceress of Enhancement. She is Queen Irene and Dor's daughter and Ida's twin sister. She appears in Dragon on a Pedestal, Crewel Lye: A Caustic Yarn, and Man from Mundania.	Piers Anthony
Princess Ida	Xanth	Sorceress of the idea. She is Queen Irene and Dor's daughter and Ivy's lost twin sister. She first appears in The Color of Her Panties.	Piers Anthony
Princesses Melody, Harmony, and Rhythm	Xanth	Triplet Sorceresses and Princess Ivy and Grey's daughters.	Piers Anthony
Tiger Lily	Peter Pan and Wendy	There is controversy over stereotypes of Native Americans with Tiger Lily being an "Indian princess", as she is obviously the daughter of the tribal chief Great Big Little Panther.	J. M. Barrie
Betsy Bobbin	Oz books	According to Ruth Plumly Thompson, Betsy becomes a Princess of Oz. She appears as the "Princess of Stones" and is referred to as "Lady Betsy Bobbin" in David Sexton's Tarot of Oz.	L. Frank Baum
Dorothy Gale	Oz books	Princess Ozma later makes her a Princess of Oz.	L. Frank Baum
Princesses of Ev	Oz books	The five daughters of the late King Evoldo of the Land of Ev: Princess Evanna; Princess Evedna; Princess Evella; Princess Evirene; Princess Evrose	L. Frank Baum
Princess Gayelette	Oz books	She was the princess and sorceress of the Gillikin Country.	L. Frank Baum
Princess Ozma	Oz books	In Ozma of Oz, she is called "princess", but functions closer to being Queen of Oz.	L. Frank Baum
Peg Amy	Oz books	Trot's doll, who, in Kabumpo in Oz, is discovered to be the enchanted form of the Princess of Sun-Top Mountain. She later marries Prince Pompadore of Pumperdink, with whom she has a daughter, Princess Pajonia of Pumperdink.	L. Frank Baum
Polychrome	Oz books	She is a cloud fairy who is the "sky princess", the youngest daughter of the Rainbow.	L. Frank Baum
Trot	Oz books	She later becomes a princess of the Ozure Isles.	L. Frank Baum
Princess Langwidere	Ozma of Oz	The princess of the Land of Ev.	L. Frank Baum
Angelica	Orlando innamorato	She reappears in the saga's continuation, Orlando furioso by Ludovico Ariosto, and in other later works based on the two originals.	Matteo Maria Boiardo
Mistaya	Magic Kingdom of Landover	She is the daughter of Ben Holiday, the High Lord of Landover, and his queen, Willow. She is born near the end of the fourth book, The Tangle Box, and is one of the main characters of the fifth, Witches' Brew. She becomes a protagonist in the sixth volume, A Princess of Landover.	Terry Brooks
Dejah Thoris	Barsoom series	The princess of the Martian city-state/empire of Helium.	Edgar Rice Burroughs
Jane Porter Clayton, Countess of Greystoke	Tarzan series	The Countess of Greystoke and the tribal queen of the Waziri people due to her marriage to Tarzan. Despite not being an official princess, her latter title arguably causes her to qualify.	Edgar Rice Burroughs
Meriem, wife of Korak	Tarzan series	The daughter-in-law of Tarzan, who is both an English peer and an African tribal chief. She is also a princess in her own right.	Edgar Rice Burroughs
Mia Thermopolis	The Princess Diaries	Amelia Mignonette Grimaldi Thermopolis Renaldo, Crown Princess of Genovia, commonly known as "Mia Thermopolis".	Meg Cabot
Elora Danan	Chronicles of the Shadow War trilogy	A series based on George Lucas's 1988 high fantasy film Willow, which take place fifteen years after the events of the film.	Chris Claremont and George Lucas
The three princesses	The Three Daughters of King O'Hara	Irish fairy tale collected by Jeremiah Curtin in Myths and Folk-lore of Ireland.	Jeremiah Curtin
Felicia	Fortunée, or Felicia and the Pot of Pinks	French literary fairy tale written by Madame d'Aulnoy. Included by Andrew Lang by in The Blue Fairy Book.	Madame d'Aulnoy
Abricotine	Le Prince Lutin	She serves as a fairy princess of the Island of Quiet Pleasures.	Madame d'Aulnoy
Princess Belle-Etoile	Princess Belle-Etoile	French fairy tale inspired by Giovanni Francesco Straparola's Ancilotto, King of Provino.	Madame d'Aulnoy
Princess Rosette	Princess Rosette	French fairy tale by Madame d'Aulnoy. Included by Andrew Lang in The Red Fairy Book.	Madame d'Aulnoy
Princess Aline	The Princess Aline	He was illustrated by Charles Dana Gibson and inspired by Princess Alix of Hesse-Darmstadt, the last tsarina of the Russian Empire who Davis was infatuated with.	Richard Harding Davis
Princess Pea	The Tale of Despereaux	The princess of Dor and the only child of King Philip and the deceased Queen.	Kate DiCamillo
The Wentworth princesses	Entwined	Based on "The Twelve Dancing Princesses".: Azaela Kathryn Wentworth, Princess Royale; Bramble Wentworth; Clover Wentworth; Delphinium Wentworth; Evening Primrose "Eve" Wentworth; Flora Wentworth; Goldenrod Wentworth; Hollyhock "Holli" Wentworth; Ivy Wentworth; Jessamine Wentworth; Kale Wentworth; Lily Wentworth	Heather Dixon
Clotilde Lothman von Saxe-Meiningen	A Scandal in Bohemia	A Scandinavian princess.	Arthur Conan Doyle
Fallon	Princess of Fire	A Saxon princess, daughter of King Harold of England.	Shannon Drake
Ce'Nedra	The Belgariad series	Imperial Princess of Tolnedra, Queen of Riva. She first appears in Queen of Sorcery.	David Eddings
Princess Li Si	Jim Button and Luke the Engine Driver	The princess of Mandala who is kidnapped by Mrs. Grindtooth and later saved by the protagonists.	Michael Ende
Sursulapitschi	Jim Button and the Wild 13	The daughter of the king of the seas.	Michael Ende
Cassandra/Evanlyn	Ranger's Apprentice	She is the crown princess, and later queen regent, of Araluen, who befriends Ranger Will Treaty and knight Horace Altman and is a natural leader. She later marries Horace, as her prince consort, and has a daughter, Madelyn.	John Flanagan
Madelyn "Maddie" Altman	Ranger's Apprentice	She is the wild princess of Araluen who becomes apprenticed to Will to become the first female Ranger in an attempt by her parents Horace and Cassandra to teach her discipline.	John Flanagan
Princess Badroulbadour	The Story of Aladdin; or, the Wonderful Lamp	A Middle Eastern folktale; one of a collection of tales from The Book of One Thousand and One Nights (Arabian Nights).	Translated and added by Antoine Galland
Princess Buttercup	The Princess Bride	A commoner chosen to marry Prince Humperdinck because she is the most beautiful woman in the world. Because the prince cannot marry a commoner, she is given the courtesy title of Princess of Hammersmith, a small region in the kingdom of Florin.	William Goldman
Queen Cyrilla of Galea	Sword of Truth series	Full name Cyrilla Amnell, who was formerly Princess Cyrilla. She is the daughter of Queen Bernadine and King Wyborn Amnell of Galea, sister of Prince Harold of Galea, and older half-sister of the Mother Confessor Kahlan Amnell.	Terry Goodkind
Princess Violet of Tamarang	Sword of Truth series	Spoilt daughter of Queen Milena of Tamarang. She later succeeds her mother as Queen of Tamarang.	Terry Goodkind
Allerleirauh	Allerleirauh		Brothers Grimm
Rapunzel	Rapunzel		Brothers Grimm
Snow White	Snow White		Brothers Grimm
The twelve princesses	The Twelve Dancing Princesses		Brothers Grimm
Cinderella	Cinderella		Brothers Grimm and Charles Perrault
Princess Beatrice	The Princess and the Hound		Mette Ivie Harrison
Princess Irulan	Dune series	Eldest daughter of the 81st Padishah Emperor Shaddam Corrino IV and Anirul.	Frank Herbert
Princess Chalice	Dune series	A daughter of the 81st Padishah Emperor Shaddam Corrino IV and Anirul.	Frank Herbert
Princess Wensicia	Dune series	The third daughter of the 81st Padishah Emperor Shaddam Corrino IV and Anirul.	Frank Herbert
Princess Josifa	Dune series	The daughters of the 81st Padishah Emperor Shaddam Corrino IV and Anirul.	Frank Herbert
Princess Rugi	Dune series	The daughters of the 81st Padishah Emperor Shaddam Corrino IV and Anirul.	Frank Herbert
Grace	Princess Grace	Illustrated by Cornelius Van Wright and Ying-Hwa Hu.	Mary Hoffman
Nausicaa	The Odyssey	She is the daughter of King Alcinous and Queen Arete of Phaeacia, who helps Odysseus when he becomes shipwrecked on the island of Scheria.	Homer
Princess Osra	The Heart of Princess Osra		Anthony Hope
Princess Flavia	The Prisoner of Zenda	Betrothed to King Rudolf of Ruritania and love of Rudolf Rassendyll. She later becomes the Queen of Ruritania in the sequel Rupert of Hentzau.	Anthony Hope
Christina Light/Princess Casamassima	Roderick Hudson; The Princess Casamassima	She is married to the Prince Casamassima.	Henry James
Kaguya-hime	The Tale of the Bamboo Cutter	Princess Kaguya (かぐや姫, Kaguya-hime) A 10th century Japanese folktale that has been adapted into various forms.	Japanese folk tale
Zhao Min	The Heaven Sword and Dragon Saber	Princess Shaomin, born Minmin Temür. She is the daughter of Chaghan Temür, the Prince of Ruyang of the Yuan Dynasty, younger sister of Köke Temür, and love interest of Zhang Wuji.	Jin Yong
Princess Beatrice	Castle in the Air	She is the strong-minded princess of Strangia who becomes engaged to Prince Justin of Ingary. She is also among the princesses taken captive by Djinn Hasruel.	Diana Wynne Jones
Princess Flower-in-the-Night	Castle in the Air	She is the daughter of the Sultan of Zanzib and, later, the wife of Abdullah. She is also among the princesses taken captive by Djinn Hasruel.	Diana Wynne Jones
Princess Hilda	House of Many Ways	She is the elderly and unmarried princess of High Norland and the daughter of the elderly King Adolphus X.	Diana Wynne Jones
Princess of Pure Reason	The Phantom Tollbooth	Twin princesses who are adopted by King Azaz the Unabridged of the Kingdom of Wisdom.	Norton Juster
Princess of Sweet Rhyme	The Phantom Tollbooth	Twin princesses who are adopted by King Azaz the Unabridged of the Kingdom of Wisdom.	Norton Juster
Carissa	A Certain Magical Index	The rebellious second princess of the United Kingdom, who attempted to conquer it to protect it from the Roman Catholic Church and its influence.	Kazuma Kamachi
Riméa	A Certain Magical Index	The eldest princess of the United Kingdom, who was opposed to her younger sister, Carissa, taking over the country.	Kazuma Kamachi
Villain	A Certain Magical Index	The youngest princess of the United Kingdom, who was opposed to her elder sister taking over the country.	Kazuma Kamachi
Princess Golden Locks	The Greek Princess and the Young Gardener	Irish fairy tale collected Kennedy's in Fireside Stories of Ireland. Included by Joseph Jacobs in More Celtic Fairy Tales.	Collected by Patrick Kennedy
Dotterine	The Child who came from an Egg	Estonian fairy tale, also known as The Egg-Born Princess (Estonian: Munast sündinud kuningatütar). Collected by Dr. Friedrich Kreutzwald in Eestirahwa Ennemuistesed jutud.	Dr. Friedrich Kreutzwald
Princess Daisy Valenski	Princess Daisy		Judith Krantz
Dani Valenski	Princess Daisy	Daisy's twin sister, who was not accepted by their father because she was born brain-damaged.	Judith Krantz
Signy	Asmund and Signy	Icelandic fairy tale collected in Islandische Märchen. Included by Andrew Lang in The Brown Fairy Book.	Collected by Andrew Lang
The Enchanted Princess	The Blue Mountains		Collected by Andrew Lang
Princess Hadvor	Hermod and Hadvor		Collected by Andrew Lang
Seserakh	Earthsea	The princess of the Kargad lands and King Thol's daughter.	Ursula K. Le Guin
Vera	Princess Ligovskaya	She is based on Varvara Lopukhina, whom the author Lermontov was in love with. Lopukhina's husband, Nikolai Bakhmetyev, was the prototype for the character of Prince Ligovskoy.	Mikhail Lermontov
Ella of Frell	Ella Enchanted	She becomes a princess when she marries Charmont (Char), the Crown Prince of Kyrria.	Gail Carson Levine
Princess Adelina (Addie)	The Two Princesses of Bamarre		Gail Carson Levine
Princess Meryl	The Two Princesses of Bamarre		Gail Carson Levine
Aravis	The Chronicles of Narnia	She marries Crown Prince Cor of Archenland; she appears as a main character in The Horse and His Boy and a minor character in The Last Battle.	C. S. Lewis
Nehemia Ytger	Throne of Glass	The Princess of Eyllwe and friend to protagonist Queen Celaena Sardothien.	Sarah J. Maas
The Light Princess	The Light Princess	Scottish fairy tale.	George MacDonald
Princess Makemnoit	The Light Princess	Scottish fairy tale.	George MacDonald
Princess Irene	The Princess and the Goblin	Princess Irene also appears, a few years older, in the book's sequel, The Princess and Curdie.	George MacDonald
Myrcella Baratheon	A Song of Ice and Fire	Princess of the House Baratheon of King's Landing. King Robert Baratheon's legal daughter, Cersei and Jaime Lannister's biological daughter, and Joffrey and Tommen's sister.	George R. R. Martin
Arianne Martell	A Song of Ice and Fire		George R. R. Martin
Elia Martell	A Song of Ice and Fire		George R. R. Martin
Rhaenys Targaryen	A Song of Ice and Fire		George R. R. Martin
Daenerys Targaryen	A Song of Ice and Fire		George R. R. Martin
Vasilisa "Lissa" Dragomir	Vampire Academy; Bloodlines	Lissa is a moroi princess and the user of a rare form of magic (spirit) who maintains a bond with dhampir Rose Hathaway. She later becomes the moroi queen and older half-sister of Jill Mastrano Dragomir in Bloodlines.	Richelle Mead
Princess Elena	The Princes and the Treasure	A strong, capable princess of Evergreen who is opposed to her father King Rufus's plans to have her marry the eligible prince.	Jeffery A. Miles
Leila Tūs Salvatíraas	The Savior's series	The current savior and ruler of Thessen.	Jenna Moreci
Princess Corenice of Atlantis	Merlin's Ring		H. Warner Munn
Princess Ben	Princess Ben	Princess Benevolence.	Catherine Gilbert Murdock
Princess Marïonoff	The Emperor's Candlesticks		Baroness Orczy
Arya Dröttningu	The Inheritance Cycle	She is the elven princess, and later queen, of Ellesméra and the only child of King Evandar and Queen Islanzadí. She first appeared in Eragon.	Christopher Paolini
Princess Esme	Discworld	Princess Esmerelda Margaret Note Spelling of Lancre, the daughter of King Verence II and Queen Magrat Garlick.	Terry Pratchett
Queen Keli	Discworld	Queen Kelirehenna I, formerly the princess of Sto Lat and the daughter of the murdered King Olerve the Bastard.	Terry Pratchett
Adelaide Bevan	The Tin Princess	Adelaide briefly becomes a princess when she is married to Prince Rudolf of Razkavia until she becomes the reigning queen due to his sudden death. A part of the Sally Lockhart series.	Philip Pullman
Ludmila	Ruslan and Ludmila	The daughter of Prince Vladimir of the Kievan Rus'.	Alexander Pushkin
Tsarevna	The Tale of the Dead Princess and the Seven Knights	Also called "The Tale of the Dead Tsarevna and the Seven Bogatyrs", the 1833 Russian poem by Alexander Pushkin.	Alexander Pushkin
Princess-Swan	The Tale of Tsar Saltan	1831 Russian poem written after the fairy tale edited by Vladimir Dahl.	Alexander Pushkin
Alasen of Kierst	Dragon Prince and Dragon Star trilogies	Princess of Meadowlord and the daughter of Prince Volog of Kierst.	Melanie Rawn
Gemma of Syr	Dragon Prince and Dragon Star trilogies	Princess of Ossteia and the younger sister of the villainous Prince Jastri.	Melanie Rawn
Sioned	Dragon Prince and Dragon Star trilogies	The Sunrunner witch and the High Princess. She is married to Rohan, the Dragon Prince of the Desert and the mother of Prince Pol; the younger sister of Prince Davvi.	Melanie Rawn
Ileana Cosânzeana	Romanian Fairy Tales	She is kidnapped by the draconic Zmeu but rescued by the heroic knight Făt-Frumos.	Romanian Folklore
Jenna Heap	Septimus Heap series	A primary character in the Septimus Heap series. She is a descendant of Princess Esmeralda.	Angie Sage
Cirilla Fiona Elen Riannon	The Witcher series	Also known as Ciri, she is the princess of Cintra and the Lady of Time and Space who is trained under Geralt of Rivia. She is Princess Pavetta and Emperor Duny's daughter and granddaughter of the late Queen Calanthe.	Andrzej Sapkowski
Cordelia	King Lear	She is the youngest of the three daughters of King Lear of Britain.	William Shakespeare
Goneril	King Lear	The oldest daughter of King Lear of Britain.	William Shakespeare
Regan	King Lear	The second daughter of King Lear of Britain.	William Shakespeare
Daughter of Antiochus	Pericles, Prince of Tyre	The unnamed daughter of King Antiochus of Antioch.	William Shakespeare
Marina	Pericles, Prince of Tyre	The daughter of Thaisa and Prince Pericles.	William Shakespeare
Thaisa	Pericles, Prince of Tyre	The daughter of Simonides, King of Pentapolis, and wife of Pericles, Prince of Tyre.	William Shakespeare
The Duchess of Gloucester	Richard II	Wife of Richard II's uncle, Thomas of Woodstock, Duke of Gloucester; based on the historical figure of Lady Eleanor de Bohun.	William Shakespeare
The Duchess of York	Richard II	Widow of Richard II's uncle, the Duke of York (who is based on the historical figure, Edmund of Langley, 1st Duke of York). Though unnamed, the Duchess is reportedly a composite of Langley's first and second wives, Infanta Isabella of Castile and Joan Holland.	William Shakespeare
Miranda	The Tempest	Daughter of Prospero, the rightful Duke of Milan, and wife of Prince Ferdinand.	William Shakespeare
Princess Gentianella	Somebody Else's Prince	A short story collected by Evelyn Sharp in The Other Side of the Sun.	Evelyn Sharp
Amalina Seraphina	Prince Otto: A Romance	The discontented princess who is married to Prince Otto of Grünewald but plots with Baron Gondremark to depose of him.	Robert Louis Stevenson
Serena	Ancilotto, King of Provino	Italian fairy tale included in The Facetious Nights of Straparola.	Giovanni Francesco Straparola
Princess	Puss in Boots	Italian fairy tale included in The Facetious Nights of Straparola, with the different versions published by Giambattista Basile and then by Charles Perrault.	Giovanni Francesco Straparola
Swedish folktale
Princess Ida	The Princess	1847 serio-comic blank verse narrative poem.	Alfred Tennyson
Princess Pajonia of Pumperdink	Oz books	The daughter of Peg Amy and Prince Pompadore of Pumperdink. She first appears in The Purple Prince of Oz.	
Planetty	Oz books	She appears in Ruth Plumly Thompson's 1938 novel The Silver Princess in Oz. She also appears in Jeff Freedman's The Magic Dishpan of Oz (1994).	
Princess Lenore	Many Moons		James Thurber
Eärwen	Unfinished Tales; The Silmarillion	Daughter of Olwë of Alqualondë, king of the Telerin Elves of Aman. She is the wife of Finarfin, Prince of the Noldor, the mother of Galadriel, and Queen of Eldamar.	J. R. R. Tolkien
Finduilas	The Children of Húrin; The Silmarillion	Daughter of Orodreth, the ruler of Nargothrond. She was a high princess of the Noldor.	J. R. R. Tolkien
Galadriel	The Lord of the Rings; The Silmarillion	Youngest child and only daughter of Finarfin, Prince and later High King of the Noldor, and Eärwen.	J. R. R. Tolkien
Idril	The Silmarillion, The Book of Lost Tales (The Fall of Gondolin)	Daughter of Turgon, Elven king of the Noldor.	J. R. R. Tolkien
Princess Lothíriel of Dol Amroth	The Lord of the Rings	Wife of Éomer.	J. R. R. Tolkien
Lúthien Tinúviel	The Silmarillion	A Telerin (Sindarin) princess, daughter of Elu Thingol, King of Doriath, and Melian the Maia.	J. R. R. Tolkien
Princess Maria Bolkonskaya	War and Peace	Princess Maria Nikolayevna Bolkonskaya. Daughter of Prince Nikolai Andreyevich Bolkonsky (Prince Bolkonsky).	Leo Tolstoy
Princess Adalmina	Adalmina's Pearl	A Finnish fairy tale about a princess who gets a magical pearl with the power to make her more beautiful, intelligent, and richer each day.	Zachris Topelius
Princess Janine de St. Jehan	Heir Apparent	The illegitimate daughter of the late King Cynric and Queen Andreanna. She is portrayed as a playable RPG character, controlled by the main character Giannine Bellisario.	Vivian Vande Velde
Aouda	Around the World in Eighty Days		Jules Verne
Laurana Kanan	Dragonlance Chronicles	A "spoiled elven princess" who becomes a "competent fighter and military leader" and heavily contributes in saving the world of Krynn.	Margaret Weis and Tracy Hickman

== Comics ==
Princess	Comic title	Notes
Diana (Wonder Woman)	DC Comics	A warrior princess of the Amazons who is known in her homeland as "Diana of Themyscira". Her powers include superhuman strength, flight, super-speed, super-stamina, and super-agility. She is proficient in hand-to-hand combat and in tactical warfare. She also possesses animal-like cunning skills and a natural rapport with animals, which has been presented as the ability to communicate with the animal kingdom. She wields her Lasso of Truth, which forces those bound by it to tell the truth, a pair of indestructible bracelets, a tiara which serves as a projectile, and, in some stories, flies an invisible airplane.
Princess Projectra	DC Comics	Projectra Wind'zzor, princess, and later queen, of the planet Orando. She has the power to create illusions.
Sensor (Jeka Wynzorr)	DC Comics	A snake-like alien who is based on Princess Projectra and debuted following the Zero Hour: Crisis in Time! reboot. She was the princess of Orando, but left to join the Legion of Super-Heroes.
Starfire	DC Comics	Princess Koriand'r of Tamaran, a planet in the Vega system.
Tara Markov / Terra	DC Comics	The princess of Markovia and the half-sister of Brion Markov.
Princess Leona	Dragon Quest: The Adventure of Dai	The princess of Papnica who trains to be a sage and is well-versed in the magic arts. Based on the Dragon Quest video game franchise.
Princess Aura	Flash Gordon	
Hephylia	Garulfo	Princess Hephylia of Brandelune and the only child to the King. She is looked after by governess Naomi. Created by Alain Ayroles and Bruno Maïorana. Series published by Delcourt (1992–2002).
Chae-kyung Shin	Goong	She is married to Crown Prince Shin Lee.
"Princes" of Kakin	Hunter × Hunter	The daughters of King Nasubi Hui Guo Rou of the Kakin kingdom. Like their brothers, the series referred to these young women being held the title of "prince", rather than "princess".: Camilla Hui Guo Rou; Tubeppa Hui Guo Rou; Tyson Hui Guo Rou; Kacho Hui Guo Rou; Fugetsu Hui Guo Rou; Momoze Hui Guo Rou; Woble Hui Guo Rou
Kilala Reno	Kilala Princess	She later becomes wife of Prince Rei.
Princess Sylphy	Kilala Princess	She is a princess of Floradiso and Kilala's former rival who claims to be Prince Rei's fiancée, though this is hinted to be unofficial.
Jadina	The Legendaries	She is a princess who is the magician and member of the team of the Legendaries, representing the virtue of Intelligence. She is the daughter of King Kinder and Queen Adeyrid of Orchidia.
Anelle	Marvel Comics	A Skrull princess and daughter of Emperor Dorrek VII and Empress R'Kill.
Ororo Munroe / Storm	Marvel Comics	The daughter of an African tribal princess, N'Dare, and American journalist David Munroe. She later joins the X-Men as Storm.
Zarda Shelton / Power Princess	Marvel Comics	The princess of Utopia Isle who is a member of the Squadron Supreme. She is considered an analogue to Wonder Woman.
Crown Princess Alexia	Mimic Royal Princess	She is a princess whose queendom is well-respected by women and not men.
Nausicaä (Shimamoto)	Nausicaä of the Valley of the Wind	Princess of the Valley of the Wind. She is named for the Princess Nausicaa in Homer's Odyssey.
Nefeltari Vivi	One Piece	The princess of Alabasta and daughter of Nefeltari Cobra and Titi. She was one of the main antagonists of the Reverse Mountain Arc under the Baroque Works codename Miss Wednesday, but ended up traveling with the Straw Hat Pirates for most of the Alabasta Saga after revealing herself to be a spy plotting against Baroque Works. She has not been featured in the main story since the Straw Hats left Alabasta, but has occasionally been shown to be keeping track of their progress.
Sailor Princesses	Sailor Moon	Sailor Princesses: Usagi Tsukino (Tsukino Usagi, "Serena"), Sailor Moon - Princess Serenity/Serena; Chibiusa (Tsukino Chibiusa, "Rini"), Sailor Chibi Moon - Princess Usagi "Small Lady" Serenity; Ami Mizuno (Mizuno Ami, "Amy"), Sailor Mercury; Rei Hino (Hino Rei, "Raye"), Sailor Mars; Makoto Kino (Kino Makoto, "Lita"), Sailor Jupiter; Minako Aino (Aino Minako, "Mina"), Sailor Venus; Setsuna Meiou (Meiō Setsuna, "Trista"), Sailor Pluto; Haruka Tenou (Ten'ō Haruka, "Amara"), Sailor Uranus; Michiru Kaiou (Kaiō Michiru, "Michelle"), Sailor Neptune; Hotaru Tomoe (Tomoe Hotaru, "Hotaru"), Sailor Saturn; There is also Princess Kakyuu, who is the princess of Kinmoku, a planet outside the solar system.
Princess Kaguya	Sailor Moon	Character from a side story of the Sailor Moon manga series, The Lover of Princess Kaguya, which is based on the Hans Christian Andersen fairy tale "The Snow Queen". The name "Princess Kaguya" comes from The Tale of the Bamboo Cutter.
Nao Kusunoki	Shounen Princess: Putri Harimau Naoko	A man who, disguised as a woman, becomes princess of Urunei after marrying Prince Ahmad, who in turn is a woman disguised as a man.
Blaze the Cat	Sonic the Hedgehog	A princess from the Sol Dimension.
Sally Acorn	Sonic the Hedgehog	The princess of the Kingdom of Acorn and the co-leader of the Freedom Fighters.
Princess Undina	Sonic the Hedgehog	An aquatic princess from Meropis whose childhood friend Coral the Betta, priestess of the Eusebes Temple, has been chosen over her. She is the daughter of Queen Angelica and King Puff.
Princess Elise	Sonic the Hedgehog	The daughter of the Duke and Duchess of Solenna, who becomes the vessel for Iblis.
Princess Erminia	The Sword of Paros	She is a lesbian princess of Paros who tries to pass as a man, similar to Princess Sapphire from Princess Knight and Oscar from The Rose of Versailles, while avoiding her arranged marriage to Prince Phaon of Kaurous, due to her love for young laundry maid Fiona.
Sakura	Tsubasa: Reservoir Chronicle	The princess of the Kingdom of Clow.

== Theatre ==
Princess	Title	Notes
Aida	Aida	She is the princess of Ethiopia who has been captured and enslaved by the Egyptians. An opera by Giuseppe Verdi. Later adapted into a rock opera and 2000 Broadway show with songs by Tim Rice and Elton John.
Amneris	Aida	She is the princess of Egypt and the daughter of the Pharaoh.
Princess Badroulbadour	Aladdin	The traditional pantomime was originally dramatized by John O'Keeffe in 1788 for the Theatre Royal, Covent Garden. Different versions of the pantomime story have been performed for over 200 years. The "Aladdin" story was also adapted into other theatrical productions. Notable adaptations include: Aladdin (1805), verse drama by Adam Oehlenschläger; with incidental music by Carl Nielsen.; The New Aladdin (1906), successful Edwardian musical comedy; Originally starred Adrienne Augarde as "The Princess"; Aladdin, the 1979 musical adaptation
Princess Stephanie of Balaria	The Balkan Princess	A British musical written by Frederick Lonsdale and Frank Curzon; lyrics by Paul Rubens and Arthur Wimperis; music by Paul Rubens.
Princess Fedora Palinska	The Circus Princess	The German operetta in three acts composed by Emmerich Kálmán with libretto by Julius Brammer and Alfred Grünwald.
Princess Yevpraksiya	The Enchantress	Princess Yevpraksiya Romanovna. 1887 Russian opera in four acts by Pyotr Ilyich Tchaikovsky.
Princess of Monte Carlo	The Grand Duke	1896 Savoy Opera written by W. S. Gilbert and Arthur Sullivan.
Cinderella	Into the Woods	
Rapunzel	Into the Woods	
Sleeping Beauty	Into the Woods	
Snow White	Into the Woods	
Princess Marie	King of Cadonia	An English musical written by Frederick Lonsdale; lyrics by Adrian Ross and Arthur Wimperis; music by Sidney Jones and Frederick Rosse (the short-lived Broadway production featured additional music by Jerome Kern).
Princess Cristiane	King's Rhapsody	She is the princess of Norseland and the daughter of King Peter.
Princesses Kirsten and Hulda	King's Rhapsody	The little cousins of Cristiane.
Princess Lena	Leonce and Lena	The Crown Princess of the Kingdom of Pipi.
Princess Althea	The Light Princess	Adapted from the Scottish fairy tale by George MacDonald.
Sara Crewe	A Little Princess	A 2004 musical based on the novel of the same name. Music by Andrew Lippa and book and lyrics by Brian Crawley.
Pamina	The Magic Flute	The daughter of the Queen of the Night. She also appears in the following sequels, Das Labyrinth and The Magic Flute Part Two.
Princess Olga	Maid of Pskov	Princess Olga Yuryevna Tokmakova. Adoptive daughter of Prince Tokmakov, biological daughter of Vera Sheloga (Tokmakov's sister-in-law) and Tsar Ivan Vasilevich the Terrible. 1872 opera composed by Nikolai Rimsky-Korsakov; based on the drama of the same name by Lev Mei.
Princess Winnifred	Once Upon a Mattress	A musical comedy based on Hans Christian Andersen's The Princess and the Pea. There is also the 2005 television film adaptation featuring Tracey Ullman as "Fred".
Tiger Lily	Peter Pan; or, the Boy Who Wouldn't Grow Up	1904 play by J. M. Barrie prior to his 1911 novel.
Princess Ida	The Princess	The Princess, A blank verse farcical play by W. S. Gilbert, parodying Alfred Tennyson's poem, "The Princess: A Medley".; Princess Ida, A comic opera; music by Arthur Sullivan, libretto by W. S. Gilbert. Based on the poem "The Princess" by Alfred Tennyson.
Princess Flavia	The Prisoner of Zenda	The 1895 play by Edward Rose, based on Anthony Hope's novel of the same name.
Princess	Puss in Boots	1915 short opera in three acts for children composed by César Cui, based on the fairy tale of the same name.
Lyudmila	Ruslan and Lyudmila	1842 Russian opera composed by Mikhail Glinka, based on Alexander Pushkin's poem of the same name.
Volkhova	Sadko	Daughter of the Sea King.
Princess Aurora	The Sleeping Beauty	The ballet composed by Pyotr Ilyich Tchaikovsky based on Charles Perrault's fairy tale of the same name.
The Princess	The Sleeping Prince: An Occasional Fairy Tale	1953 play by Terence Rattigan.
Princess	The Snow Queen	A chamber opera in six scenes based on the Hans Christian Andersen fairy tale of the same name; prologue by Matthew King, libretto by Andrew McKinnon.
Princess Margaret	The Student Prince	The daughter of Grand Duchess Anastasia. The 1924 operetta in four acts composed by Sigmund Romberg.
Princess Alexandra	The Swan	1920 play by Ferenc Molnár.
Princess Odette	Swan Lake	The princess who has been turned into a swan by the curse of an evil sorcerer.
Princess Léonide	The Triumph of Love	She is the former princess of Sparta who disguises herself as a man under the name Phocion after learning that her lover, Agis, is the rightful heir to the Spartan throne. The play was originally written by Pierre de Marivaux in 1732 and later adapted into a Broadway musical by James Magruder in 1997.
Disney Princesses	Various	Several Disney Princesses have gotten their own musicals.: Jasmine, in Aladdin; Belle, in Beauty and the Beast; Anna and Elsa, in Frozen; Megara, in Hercules; Ariel, in The Little Mermaid; Moana, in Moana Jr.; Mulan, in Mulan Jr.
Princess Maria Bolkonskaya	War and Peace	Princess Maria Nikolayevna Bolkonskaya. Opera based on the novel by Leo Tolstoy.
Zémire	Zémire et Azor	Operatic version of the fairy-tale Beauty and the Beast, written by Jean-François Marmontel and composed by André Grétry.

== Film ==
=== Live-action ===
Princess	Film	Notes
Princess Herzelinde	1½ Knights: In Search of the Ravishing Princess Herzelinde	Portrayed by Julia Dietze.
Princess Parisa	The 7th Voyage of Sinbad	The daughter of the Sultan of Chandra. Portrayed by Kathryn Grant.
The Wachati Princess	Ace Ventura: When Nature Calls	Daughter of the Wachati Chief and sister of Prince Ouda. She has been engaged to Tiny Warrior, prince of the Wachootoo tribe. Portrayed by Sophie Okonedo.
Princess Kanza Omar	Ali Baba and the Forty Thieves	Portrayed by Alma M. Pappas (uncredited).
Princess Fatima	Ali Baba and the Seven Saracens	Portrayed by Bella Cortez.
Princess Miriam	Ali Baba Goes to Town	Portrayed by June Lang.
Princess Aouda	Around the World in 80 Days	1956 film based on the famous novel of the same name by Jules Verne. Portrayed by Shirley MacLaine.
Princess Selenia	Arthur and the Invisibles; Arthur and the Revenge of Maltazard; Arthur 3: The War of the Two Worlds	Daughter of Emperor Sifrat XVI and older sister of Prince Betameche. Based on the French Arthur book series by Luc Besson. Portrayed by Madonna (original) and Selena Gomez (sequels).
Princess Henriette	At Sword's Point	1952 film that features the offsprings of the Three Musketeers. Portrayed by Nancy Gates.
Princess Antillia	Atlantis, the Lost Continent	The daughter of King Cronus of Atlantis and one of the main characters of the film. Portrayed by Joyce Taylor.
Neytiri of the Omaticaya Na'vi	Avatar	Portrayed by Zoe Saldaña, the character of Neytiri may well be considered a princess. Although she is never actually called by this title in the film, her status as both the daughter of a tribal chieftain and the heir to a high priestly office that is usually held by the women of her family means that she is commonly referred to as one by both real-world commentators and fans alike.
Devasena	Baahubali: The Beginning; Baahubali 2: The Conclusion	She is the princess of Kuntala Kingdom, a skilled archer and a fighter. Portrayed by Anushka Shetty.
Princess Natalya Petrovna	Balalaika	Based on the 1936 musical of the same name by Eric Maschwitz. Portrayed by Zeffie Tilbury.
Princess Taramis	Barbarian Queen	Portrayed by Dawn Dunlap.
Belle	La Belle et la Bête (Beauty and the Beast)	French film adaptation of the fairy-tale of the same name, known in English as Beauty and the Beast. Belle is portrayed in the film by Josette Day.
Princess Leyla	Black Gold	She is the princess from Hobeika, daughter of Emir Nesib and sister of Prince Tariq. Based on the novel South of the Heart: A Novel of Modern Arabia by Hans Ruesch. Portrayed by Freida Pinto.
Shuri	Marvel Cinematic Universe	Princess of Wakanda, daughter of the late King T'Chaka and sister of King T'Challa. Portrayed by Letitia Wright.
Princess Teresa	The Brigand	Portrayed by Jody Lawrance.
Princess Jana	Captain Sindbad	Princess of Baristan. Portrayed by Heidi Brühl.
Maharani Ammanmani Chandravathy	Chandra	Portrayed by Shriya Saran.
Princess Emily	A Christmas Prince; A Christmas Prince: The Royal Wedding; A Christmas Prince: The Royal Baby	Princess Emily of Aldovia; younger sister of King Richard and sister-in-law of Queen Amber. Portrayed by Honor Kneafsey.
Princess Elleri	A Christmas Prince: The Royal Baby	Princess Elleri Claire of Aldovia; newborn daughter of King Richard and Queen Amber.
Princess Meeka Joffer	Coming 2 America	The first daughter of King Akeem and Queen Lisa Joffer and the heir apparent of Zamunda. Portrayed by KiKi Layne.
Princess Omma Joffer	Coming 2 America	The second daughter of King Akeem and Queen Lisa Joffer of Zamunda. Portrayed by Bella Murphy.
Princess Tinashe Joffer	Coming 2 America	The third daughter of King Akeem and Queen Lisa Joffer of Zamunda. Portrayed by Akiley Love.
Princess Yasimina	Conan the Barbarian	She is the daughter of King Osric of Zamora. Portrayed by Valérie Quennessen.
Princess Jehnna	Conan the Destroyer	She is the niece of Queen Taramis of Shadizar. Portrayed by Olivia d'Abo.
Princess Mirska	Conquest	Based on the novel Pani Walewska by Wacław Gąsiorowski. Portrayed by Betty Blythe (uncredited).
Princess Gwendolyn	The Court Jester	Princess Gwendolyn of England, the daughter of King Roderick the Tyrant. She was portrayed by Angela Lansbury.
Empress Phoenix	Curse of the Golden Flower	Portrayed by Li Gong.
Princess Ling Moy	Daughter of the Dragon	Portrayed by Anna May Wong.
Princess Diana of Themyscira	DC Extended Universe	Better known as Wonder Woman, she is the Amazon crown princess of Themyscira. She is portrayed by Gal Gadot in: Batman v Superman: Dawn of Justice; Wonder Woman; Justice League; Wonder Woman 1984; Zack Snyder's Justice League
Princess Maria	Death Takes a Holiday	Portrayed by Kathleen Howard.
Princess Codille	Deathstalker	Portrayed by Barbi Benton.
Princess Evie	Deathstalker II	Warrior princess of Jzafir. Portrayed by Monique Gabrielle.
Princesses Carissa and Elizena	Deathstalker III: The Warriors from Hell	The twin princesses, both portrayed by Carla Herd.
Inca Princess Kawillaka	Dora and the Lost City of Gold	2019 film based on the animated series Dora the Explorer. Portrayed by Q'orianka Kilcher.
Mehgan	Dragonheart: Battle for the Heartfire	She is the biological daughter of the late King Walter of Britannia, granddaughter of King Gareth and Queen Rhonu and twin sister of Edric. Portrayed by Jessamine-Bliss Bell.
Princess Elspeth	Dragonslayer	The princess of Urland and the daughter of King Casiodorus. Portrayed by Chloe Salaman.
Princess Irulan	Dune	Eldest daughter of the 81st Padishah Emperor Shaddam IV and Anirul. Elder sister of Chalice, Wensicia, Josifa, and Rugi. Portrayed by Virginia Madsen in the 1984 film adaptation.
Princess Nandini	Eklavya: The Royal Guard	2007 Indian film. Portrayed by Raima Sen.
Ella of Frell	Ella Enchanted	She was born in the kingdom of Frell, and given the "gift of obedience" by the fairy Lucinda, which forces her to do anything she is told. Several years later, Ella's mother dies after instructing her to keep the curse secret from everyone, even her father. Portrayed by Anne Hathaway.
Arya Dröttningu	Eragon	The elf princess of Ellesméra. Based on the novel of the same name by Christopher Paolini; portrayed by Sienna Guillory. Arya also appeared in the video game adaptation.
Princess Aud	Erik the Viking	She is the daughter of King Arnulf. Portrayed by Imogen Stubbs.
Danielle de Barbarac	Ever After: A Cinderella Story	She becomes the wife of Prince Henry. 1998 film adaptation of "Cinderella" set in Renaissance France. Portrayed by Drew Barrymore.
Princess Luisa	Fire and Ice: The Dragon Chronicles	The princess of Carpia and the daughter of King Augustin and Queen Remini. Portrayed by Amy Acker.
Princess Helen/Jane Hamilton	Fit for a King	Portrayed by Helen Mack.
Princess Marcuzan	Frankenstein Meets the Space Monster	A Martian princess, portrayed by Marilyn Hanold.
Princess Zora	The Frog Prince	Based on the classic fairy tale of the same name, Zora is the niece of King William and the younger sister of Princess Henrietta, who kisses Ribbit the frog to change him back into a human prince. She was portrayed by Aileen Quinn.
Princess Mary	Gulliver's Travels	Princess of Lilliput and daughter of King Theodore and Queen Isabelle. Portrayed by Emily Blunt.
Princess Diana	Hercules and the Princess of Troy	The princess of Troy, portrayed by Diana Hyland.
Princess Alexandra	Here is My Heart	Based on the play La Grande-Duchesse et le garçon d'étage by Alfred Savoir. Portrayed by Kitty Carlisle.
Princess Yuki Akizuki	The Hidden Fortress	Portrayed by Misa Uehara.
Princess Gloria	His Majesty, the Scarecrow of Oz	The daughter of King Krewl of the Land of Oz. Portrayed by Vivian Reed.
Princess Nawa	The Hot Chick	Portrayed by Shazia Ali. Nawa was an Abyssinian princess who used her magical earrings to switch bodies with a slave girl to escape from an arranged marriage in 50 BC. These earrings are later used by both a modern teenage girl, Jessica, and a criminal, Clive, as they accidentally switch their bodies.
Cinderella	Into the Woods	She is loosely based on the protagonist from the fairy tale of the same name. Portrayed by Anna Kendrick.
Rapunzel	Into the Woods	She is loosely based on the protagonist from the fairy tale of the same name. Portrayed by MacKenzie Mauzy.
Princess Aneta	It Is Hell With the Princess	2009 Czech film. Portrayed by Tereza Voříšková.
Princess Isabelle	Jack the Giant Slayer	Portrayed by Eleanor Tomlinson.
Princess Taou Yuen	Java Head	The daughter of the Manchu noble.: Java Head, 1923 silent film version starring Leatrice Joy.; Java Head, 1934 British sound film remake starring Anna May Wong.
Jodhaa Bai	Jodhaa Akbar	A Rajput princess portrayed by Aishwarya Rai Bachchan.
Dejah Thoris	John Carter	Princess of Helium. Portrayed by Lynn Collins.
Mrinalini "Mili" Chakravarty	Khoobsurat	Originally a physiotherapist of the Kolkata Knight Riders, Mili is married to Prince Vikram Rathore, receiving the title of "The Royal Misfit". Portrayed by Sonam Kapoor.
Princess Divya Rathore	Khoobsurat	She is the younger sister of Prince Vikram and the daughter of King Shekhar Singh and Queen Nirmala Devi Rathore of Rajasthan. Portrayed by Simran Jehani.
Princess Tania/Catherine Bell	King Kelly of the U.S.A.	The princess of the European kingdom of Belgardia and the daughter of King Maximilian. Portrayed by Irene Ware.
Princess Anna of Finland	King Ralph	Portrayed by Joely Richardson.
Princess Cristiane	King's Rhapsody	Princess Cristiane of Norseland. Based on the stage musical of the same name by Ivor Novello; portrayed by Patrice Wymore.
Lyssa	Krull	Portrayed by Lisette Anthony (Lindsay Crouse, dub).
Princess Lily	Legend	Portrayed by Mia Sara.
Princess Zarina	Leprechaun 4: In Space	The alien princess of the planet Dominia. Portrayed by Rebekah Carlton.
Sara Crewe	A Little Princess	Multiple film adaptations of Frances Hodgson Burnett's novel have been made. Some notable examples include: The Little Princess (1917), silent film starring Mary Pickford; The Little Princess (1939), starring Shirley Temple; A Little Princess (1995), starring Liesel Matthews; Sarah... Ang Munting Prinsesa (1995), starring Camille Prats; 1995 Filipino film adaptation of the anime Princess Sarah, based on the novel A Little Princess.
Princess Thania of Arvonne	The Lone Wolf in Paris	Portrayed by Frances Drake.
Princess Hedwig	Long Live the King	Based on the novel of the same name by Mary Roberts Rinehart. Portrayed by Ruth Renick.
Galadriel	The Lord of the Rings	Youngest child and only daughter of Finarfin, Prince of the Noldor, and Eärwen. Portrayed by Cate Blanchett.
Princess Sophia Alexnov	Meet the Prince	Portrayed by Julia Faye.
Princess Lauranna	Men in Black II	Zarthon ambassador to Earth, and keeper of the Light of Zartha. She is the love interest of Agent Kay and mother of Laura Vasquez. The actual Princess Lauranna, as the ambassador of her people, is portrayed by Linda Kim. In the "Mysteries in History" video shown within the film, she is portrayed by Paige Brooks.
Laura Vasquez	Men in Black II	Princess and the Light of Zartha, daughter of Princess Lauranna and love interest of Agent J. Portrayed by Rosario Dawson.
Ahmanet	The Mummy	She is the Egyptian princess and the titular antagonist who was mummified alive. Loosely based on the ancient Egyptian goddess Amunet as well as Imhotep from the original Mummy films; portrayed by Sofia Boutella.
Nefertiri	The Mummy Returns	Portrayed by Rachel Weisz.
Princess Elsa	My Pal, the King	The aunt of young King Charles V of Alvonia. Portrayed by Noel Francis.
Princess Marie de Namour de la Bonfain	Naughty Marietta	1935 film based on the 1910 operetta of the same name. Portrayed by Jeanette MacDonald.
Katherine "Katie" Hollingston	Once Upon a Holiday	Princess of Montsaurai, in the 2015 Hallmark television film. Portrayed by Briana Evigan as a young woman and Kayden Magnuson as a child.
Princess Moanna/Ofelia	Pan's Labyrinth	The daughter of the King and Queen of the Underworld; stepdaughter of Captain Vidal. Portrayed by Ivana Baquero.
Tiger Lily	Peter Pan	Peter Pan, 1924 silent film starring Anna May Wong.; Peter Pan, 2003 American film starring Carsen Gray.; Neverland, 2003 Indie film starring Ray Garcia.; Pan, 2015 film starring Rooney Mara.; Based on J. M. Barrie's 1904 play, Peter Pan; or, the Boy Who Wouldn't Grow Up, and 1911 novel, Peter and Wendy.
Princess Dala	The Pink Panther	She is the exiled princess from the Asian mountain kingdom of Lugash. Portrayed by Claudia Cardinale (voiced by Gale Garnett, uncredited).
Rajkumari Chandrika and Radhika	Prem Ratan Dhan Payo	The half-sisters of Crown Prince Vijay Singh of Pritampur. Portrayed by Swara Bhaskar and Aashika Bhatia respectively.
Princess Maithili Devi	Prem Ratan Dhan Payo	Portrayed by Sonam Kapoor.
Princess Astrid	Pretty Princess	1993 Italian film; portrayed by Jessica Simpson.
Princess Sofia	Pretty Princess	The princess of a small principality of Liechtenhaus and the daughter of Prince Max. Portrayed by Barbara Snellenburg.
Princess Amrita	Prince	Portrayed by Vyjayanthimala.
Paige Morgan	The Prince & Me; The Prince & Me 2: The Royal Wedding; The Prince & Me: A Royal Honeymoon; The Prince & Me: The Elephant Adventure	She is the love interest of Crown Prince Edvard before she is married to him to become the queen of Denmark. Portrayed by Julia Stiles (original) and Kam Heskin (sequels).
Princess Arabella	The Prince & Me	Portrayed by Eliza Bennett.
Princess Carmilla	The Prince & Me 2: The Royal Wedding	Portrayed by Lana Likic.
Princess Gabrielle	The Prince & Me 2: The Royal Wedding	Portrayed by Paulína Bakarová.
Princess Kirsten	The Prince & Me 2: The Royal Wedding	The newcomer princess of Norway and a childhood friend of Edvard. Portrayed by Clemency Burton-Hill.
Princess Myra	The Prince & Me: The Elephant Adventure	The princess of Sangyoon and the daughter of King Saryu. Portrayed by Ase Wang.
Princess Gwendolyn	Prince Charming	She was the princess of Lothian. 2001 television film portrayed by Christina Applegate.
Kate	Prince Charming	She marries Prince John of Anwyn. Also portrayed by Christina Applegate.
Princess Tamina	Prince of Persia: The Sands of Time	Princess of Alamut. Portrayed by Gemma Arterton.
Princess Ilene	Prince Valiant (1954); Prince Valiant (1997)	Portrayed by Debra Paget in the 1954 version and Katherine Heigl in the 1997 version.
Princess Aleta	Prince Valiant	Portrayed by Janet Leigh.
Princess Calliope	Princess	2008 ABC Family Original Movie. Portrayed by Nicole Gale Anderson.
Princess Ithaca	Princess	Portrayed by Nora Zehetner.
The Princess	The Princess	She is a strong, dedicated princess in the medieval realm who along with her sister Princess Violet and friend Linh fights off against Julius and his brutal mercenaries in the 2022 Hulu original film. Portrayed by Allegra du Troit as a child and Joey King as an adult.
Princess Songhwa	The Princess and the Matchmaker	Portrayed by Shim Eun-kyung.
Princess Margaret Warbrook	The Princess and the Pirate	Portrayed by Virginia Mayo (singing voice dubbed by Louanne Hogan).
Princess Evelyn	Princess and the Pony	Portrayed by Fiona Perry.
Princess Buttercup	The Princess Bride	Portrayed by Robin Wright. Based on the 1973 novel of the same name by William Goldman.
Princess Caraboo/Mary Baker	Princess Caraboo	Portrayed by Phoebe Cates.
Princess Daisy Valenski	Princess Daisy	Based on the best-selling novel of the same name by Judith Krantz. Portrayed by Merete Van Kamp as an adult and by Rachel Dennis as a child.
Dani Valenski	Princess Daisy	Daisy's twin sister, not accepted by their father because she was born brain-damaged. Portrayed by Merete Van Kamp as an adult and by Melissa Dennis as a child.
Mia Thermopolis	The Princess Diaries; The Princess Diaries 2: Royal Engagement	Amelia Mignonette Thermopolis Renaldi, Princess of Genovia, commonly known as "Mia Thermopolis". She later becomes Queen of Genovia. Portrayed by Anne Hathaway.
Princess Asana	The Princess Diaries 2: Royal Engagement	Portrayed by Raven-Symoné.
Kaya, the Princess Kaguya	Princess from the Moon	Based on The Tale of the Bamboo Cutter. Portrayed by Yasuko Sawaguchi.
Princess Maria	Princess O'Rourke	1943 romantic comedy starring Olivia de Havilland, Robert Cummings, and Charles Coburn. It is similar to the later Roman Holiday (1953), which starred Audrey Hepburn and Gregory Peck.
Princess Shalimar/Taura	Princess of the Nile	She is the princess of Egypt who disguises herself as a popular dancer in the Tambourine Tavern to escape prison. She was portrayed by Debra Paget.
Princess Rosalinda Montoya Fiore/Rosie Gonzalez	Princess Protection Program	The princess, and later queen, of Costa Luna. Portrayed by Demi Lovato.
Lady Margaret Katherine Claire Delacourt	The Princess Switch	The duchess of Montenaro who trades places with Stacy De Novo. She later becomes the queen of Montenaro in Switched Again. Inspired by Mark Twain's novel "The Prince and the Pauper", Margaret is portrayed by Vanessa Hudgens.
Stacy Juliette De Novo	The Princess Switch	Formerly a baker, Stacy is married to Prince Edward Wyndham after switching places with Lady Margaret. She is also portrayed by Vanessa Hudgens.
Rajkumari Vishaka	Rajkumar	Portrayed by Madhuri Dixit.
Princess Natasha	Rasputin and the Empress	Portrayed by Diana Wynyard.
Princess Yuna	Rebirth of Mothra II	Princess of the ancient civilization of Nirai Kanai. Portrayed by Maho Nonami.
Princess Belladonna	Your Highness	Portrayed by Zooey Deschanel.
Princess Lala McTavish	Road to Bali	She is a half-Scottish princess in Bali and the cousin of Prince Ken Arok. Portrayed by Dorothy Lamour.
Princess Alexandra	The Rogue Song	Portrayed by Nance O'Neil.
Princess Vera	The Rogue Song	Portrayed by Catherine Dale Owen.
Princess Ann/Anya Smith	Roman Holiday	1953 romantic comedy starring Gregory Peck and Audrey Hepburn. Hepburn won an Academy Award for Best Actress for her portrayal of Princess Ann. The film was remade for television in 1987, starring Tom Conti and Catherine Oxenberg, daughter of Princess Elizabeth of Yugoslavia.
Princess Anne	The Royal Bed	Based on the 1928 play The Queen's Husband by Robert E. Sherwood. Portrayed by Mary Astor.
Emily Taylor	A Royal Christmas	She is married to Prince Leopold. Portrayed by Lacey Chabert in the 2014 Hallmark television film.
Duchess Natasha	A Royal Christmas	Duchess Natasha of Warren. Portrayed by Katherine Flynn.
Princess Priscilla	The Runaway Princess	Based on the 1905 novel Princess Priscilla's Fortnight by Elizabeth von Arnim. Portrayed by Mady Christians.
Ludmila	Ruslan and Ludmila	Based on the Russian poem of the same name. Portrayed by Natalya Petrova.
Princess Rose	The Seventh Dwarf	She is the ruler of Castle Fantabularasa who is cursed by the evil ice fairy Dellamorta to fall into a deep sleep which can only be lifted with a kiss of true love.
Princess Pei-Pei	Shanghai Noon	She is the daughter of the Emperor of China. Portrayed by Lucy Liu.
Princess Trubetskaya	The Silver Skates	She is the mother of Prince Arkadiy Trubetskoy of the Russian Empire. Portrayed by Elena Rufanova.
Princess Farah	Sinbad and the Eye of the Tiger	The princess of Charak and the sister of Prince Kassim; stepdaughter of the evil Queen Zenobia. Portrayed by Jane Seymour.
Princess Alina	Sinbad of the Seven Seas	Portrayed by Alessandra Martines.
Cinderella	The Slipper and the Rose	She marries Prince Edward, in the retelling fairy tale of "Cinderella". Portrayed by Gemma Craven.
Summer Princess	Snow Queen	2002 made-for-television made by Hallmark Entertainment. Based on Hans Christian Andersen's fairy tale "The Snow Queen". Portrayed by Kira Clavell.
Princess	The Snow Queen	2005 BBC television movie based on Hans Christian Andersen's fairy tale "The Snow Queen". Portrayed by Leah Cudmore.
Snow White		Numerous adaptations of the Snow White story have been made over time, starring several different actresses. Some of these include: Marguerite Clark in Snow White, a 1916 silent film.; Rossana Podestà in The Seven Dwarfs to the Rescue (Italian: I sette nani alla riscossa), the 1951 Italian comedy film.; Elke Arendt in Snow White and the Seven Dwarfs (German: Schneewittchen und die 7 Zwerge) (1955); Carol Heiss in Snow White and the Three Stooges (1961).; Sarah Patterson in Snow White (1987), a musical film.; Kristin Kreuk in Snow White: The Fairest of Them All (2001); Cosma Shiva Hagen in 7 Dwarves – Men Alone in the Wood (German: 7 Zwerge – Männer allein im Wald), a 2004 German comedy film and its sequels 7 Dwarves: The Forest Is Not Enough (2006) and The Seventh Dwarf (2014).; Rachel Zegler in Snow White (2025).; Eliza Bennett in Grimm's Snow White (2012).; Lily Collins in Mirror Mirror (2012).; Kristen Stewart in Snow White and the Huntsman (2012).
Lilli Hoffman	Snow White: A Tale of Terror	1997 film based on Snow White. Portrayed by Monica Keena.
Princess Yasmin	Son of the Pink Panther	She is the daughter of King Haroak and the new princess of the Asian kingdom of Lugash. Portrayed by Debrah Farentino.
Padmé Amidala	Star Wars	Elected Queen of Naboo at the young age of 14 after previously serving as the Princess of Theed. She later serves her people as a senator for Naboo. Portrayed by Natalie Portman in: Star Wars: Episode I – The Phantom Menace; Star Wars: Episode II – Attack of the Clones; Star Wars: Episode III – Revenge of the Sith
Leia Organa	Star Wars	Secretly adopted daughter of Bail Prestor Organa (formally styled as His Serene Highness Prince Bail Organa, First Chairman and Viceroy of Alderaan). Portrayed in the original and sequel trilogy films by Carrie Fisher: Star Wars Episode IV: A New Hope; The Empire Strikes Back; Return of the Jedi; The Force Awakens; The Last Jedi; The Rise of Skywalker
Princess Una	Stardust	Portrayed by Kate Magowan.
Princess Beatrice	The Strange Adventures of Prince Courageous	1923 silent film series. Portrayed by Doreen Turner.
Princess Johanna	The Student Prince	Based on the operetta of the same name by Sigmund Romberg. Portrayed by Betta St. John.
Princess Jorala	Super Buddies	She is an alien princess of the planet Ispirion. Voiced by Fiona Gubelmann.
Demon Princess Elzebub	The Super Inframan	Also known as Princess Dragon Mom in English dub, she is the ruler of Inner Earth and the main villainess of the film. Portrayed by Terry Liu.
Princess Daisy	Super Mario Bros.	Portrayed by Samantha Mathis in the 1993 film loosely based on the video game of the same name.
Princess Alexandra	The Swan	Frances Howard in The Swan (1925); Lillian Gish in One Romantic Night (1930); Grace Kelly in The Swan (1956); Based on the 1920 play The Swan by Ferenc Molnár.
Princess Beatrice	The Swan	Ida Waterman in The Swan (1925); Marie Dressler in One Romantic Night (1930); Jessie Royce Landis in The Swan (1956)
Violet	Tale of Tales	Princess of Highhills, portrayed by Bebe Cave. Based on the fairy tale collection "Pentamerone".
The Princess	The Thief of Bagdad (1940); and The Thief of Bagdad (1924)	This character appears in the 1940 Technicolor film and 1924 silent version of this story, based on a loose adaptation of the story of "Aladdin". Portrayed by June Duprez in 1940 and Julanne Johnston in 1924.
Princess Amina	The Thief of Baghdad (1961)	Portrayed by Giorgia Moll.
Princess Yasmine	The Thief of Baghdad (1978)	Princess Yasmine of Baghdad. Portrayed by Palva Ustinov.
Princess "Zizzi" Catterina	Thirty-Day Princess	Princess of Taronia. Portrayed by Sylvia Sidney.
The Princess	Triumph of Love Triumph of Love (2001 film)	2001 film based on the three-act comic play and musical of the same name. Portrayed by Mira Sorvino.
Princess Brenda/Miss Vandeleur	Trouble for Two	Princess Brenda of Irania. Portrayed by Rosalind Russell.
Anna Valerious	Van Helsing	Princess of the Gypsies. Portrayed by Kate Beckinsale.
Princess Mandakini	Vanjikottai Valiban	The princess of the Ratna Island Kingdom. Portrayed by Vyjayanthimala.
Princess Padma	Vanjikottai Valiban	The princess of the Vanjikottai Kingdom. Portrayed by Padmini.
Elora Danan	Willow	An infant child prophesied to bring about the downfall of the evil Queen Bavmorda. She is portrayed alternately by twins Kate and Ruth Greenfield, Rebecca Bearman, Kristen Lang (for scenes shot in Marin County), and, for scenes shot in New Zealand, by Isla Brentwood, Laura Hopkirk, and Gina Nelson.
Princess Carlotta ("Carly")	A Winter Princess	2019 Hallmark television film. Portrayed by Natalie Hall.
Princess Aura	Wizards of the Lost Kingdom	The princess, and later queen, of Axeholme. Portrayed by Dolores Michaels.
Princess Amathea	Wizards of the Lost Kingdom II	The warrior princess of Venir. Portrayed by Lana Clarkson.
Princess Octavia	Yahudi Ki Ladki	Yahudi Ki Ladki (1933), portrayed by Tarabai; Yahudi Ki Ladki (1957); Yahudi (1958), portrayed by Nigar Sultana; Based on the Urdu play of the same name by Agha Hashar Kashmiri.

=== Animated ===
==== Disney ====
Princess	Film	Notes
Jasmine	Aladdin	Based on Princess Badroulbadour from the tale of "The Story of Aladdin; or, the Wonderful Lamp" from The Book of One Thousand and One Nights (Arabian Nights). She falls in love with Aladdin. She is voiced by Linda Larkin, with her singing voice provided by Lea Salonga.
Belle	Beauty and the Beast	She falls in love with the Beast. Voiced by Paige O'Hara.
Princess Eilonwy	The Black Cauldron	Based on the character from Lloyd Alexander's The Chronicles of Prydain. Voiced by Susan Sheridan.
Merida	Brave	Daughter of King Fergus and Queen Elinor of DunBroch and older sister of Princes Harris, Hubert and Hamish. Voiced by Peigi Barker as a child, and by Kelly Macdonald as a young woman. Merida joined the official Disney Princess Lineup in July 2013.
Cinderella	Cinderella	She marries Prince Charming. Originally voiced by Ilene Woods.
Anna	Frozen; Frozen II	Princess Anna of Arendelle, one of the main protagonists of Disney's Frozen. Anna is inspired by Gerda from The Snow Queen, a fairy tale by Hans Christian Andersen. In Frozen II, she becomes the new Queen of Arendelle as Elsa becomes the guardian of the Enchanted Forest. Voiced by Kristen Bell.
Elsa	Frozen; Frozen II	Formerly Princess Elsa of Arendelle. She possesses powers over ice and snow and is the elder sister of Anna. Elsa is inspired by the titular character from Hans Christian Andersen's The Snow Queen. Voiced by Idina Menzel.
Megara "Meg"	Hercules	Loosely based on the Theban princess of the same name, Meg is a con artist who is married to Hercules, the prince of the gods in Mount Olympus, in Zero to Hero. She is inspired by Barbara Stanwyck's character in The Lady Eve and was voiced by Susan Egan.
Kiara	The Lion King II: Simba's Pride	She is the feisty, adventurous princess and heir of the Pride Lands and the daughter of King Simba and Queen Nala. In The Lion Guard, Kiara is the older sister of Kion.
Ariel	The Little Mermaid	Ariel has long, flowing red hair, blue eyes, a green tail, and wears a lavender seashell bikini top. She is the youngest daughter of King Triton.
Princess Minnie	Mickey, Donald, Goofy: The Three Musketeers	She is the mouse princess of the Kingdom of France, portrayed by Minnie Mouse (voiced by Russi Taylor), though she is not technically a princess. Minnie also portrays the role of a princess in two Mickey Mouse short films: Ye Olden Days; Brave Little Tailor
Moana	Moana; Moana 2	Moana is the daughter of a chief in a long line of navigators, who sets sail to an island with a demigod, Maui, to help her family. Despite not technically being a princess, Moana joined the official Disney Princess Lineup in 2019. She's the older sister of Simea in Moana 2. Voiced by Louise Bush as a toddler and Auliʻi Cravalho as a young adult.
Mulan	Mulan	Despite not being a princess by birth nor by marriage, Mulan holds an honorary Disney Princess status as part of the official Disney Princess lineup. She is the last Disney Princess to be developed during the Disney Renaissance. She is voiced by Ming-Na Wen, while her singing voice is provided by Lea Salonga.
Tiger Lily	Peter Pan	Based on the 1904 play, Peter Pan; or, the Boy Who Wouldn't Grow Up, and the 1911 novel, Peter and Wendy, both by J. M. Barrie. Unlike most of the media adaptations of Peter Pan, Tiger Lily is unable to speak.
Pocahontas	Pocahontas	Based loosely on the real-life Pocahontas, she is considered the Indian princess to the English. She falls in love with John Smith. She is voiced by Irene Bedard, while her singing voice is provided by Judy Kuhn.
Tiana	The Princess and the Frog	She marries Prince Naveen. Voiced by Elizabeth Dampier as a child and Anika Noni Rose as a young adult.
Nala	The Lion King	She's the lioness daughter of Sarafina and the love interest of Simba. Voiced by Moira Kelly while her singing voice is Sally Dworsky. Niketa Calame provided the voice of young Nala while Laura Williams provided the singing voice of young Nala.
Namaari	Raya and the Last Dragon	She is the warrior princess of the tribe of Fang in Kumandra and daughter of Chieftess Virana. She was formerly a villain and Raya's arch-nemesis. Voiced by Jona Xiao as a teenager and Gemma Chan as an adult.
Raya	Raya and the Last Dragon	The daughter of Chief Benja of the tribe of Heart in Kumandra, she is a heroic warrior princess who assumes the role of the Guardian of the Dragon Gem and embarks in search for Sisu, the last dragon. She is inspired by the character of Star-Lord and is voiced by Kelly Marie Tran.
Aurora (aka Briar Rose)	Sleeping Beauty	Daughter of King Stefan and Queen Leah. She falls in love with Prince Phillip. She is originally voiced by Mary Costa.
Snow White	Snow White and the Seven Dwarfs	The central character of Walt Disney's first animated feature film, and the first Disney Princess. Voiced by Adriana Caselotti.
Rapunzel	Tangled	The long-lost princess of Corona and daughter of King Frederic and Queen Arianna. Voiced by Mandy Moore.
Vanellope von Schweetz	Wreck-It Ralph; Ralph Breaks the Internet	The lost princess of Sugar Rush, who by the film's end rejects the title, preferring to race in her parent game (Sugar Rush) over being royalty.

==== Other ====
Princess	Film	Notes
Anastasia (Anya)	Anastasia	Loosely based on the true story of Anastasia Romanov, youngest daughter of Nicholas II, the last Russian Tsar, and the rumors surrounding her supposed escape from the massacre that killed her family. After Disney acquired Fox, Anya became a de facto Disney Princess. Voiced by Meg Ryan; singing voice by Liz Callaway.
Snow White	Happily Ever After	Voiced by Irene Cara.
Princess Arianna	Hercules	The Golden Films version of the myth of Hercules.
Xena	Hercules and Xena – The Animated Movie: The Battle for Mount Olympus	A warrior princess and she is voiced by Lucy Lawless
Nausicaä	Nausicaä of the Valley of the Wind	A 1984 animated film by Hayao Miyazaki, based on his manga of the same name. Other princesses who appear in the film: Princess Lastelle of Pejite; Princess Kushana of Tolmekia
Sara Rhubarb	The Penniless Princess	2012 VeggieTales retelling of A Little Princess.
Princess of Pure Reason	The Phantom Tollbooth	Based on the 1961 children's book of the same name by Norton Juster. Voiced by June Foray and Patti Gilbert.
Princess of Sweet Rhyme	The Phantom Tollbooth	Based on the 1961 children's book of the same name by Norton Juster. Voiced by June Foray and Patti Gilbert.
Princess Eloise	The Pirates Who Don't Do Anything: A VeggieTales Movie	The leek princess of Monteria and the younger sister of Prince Alexander. Voiced by Laura Gerow.
Kimia	Pokémon the Movie: Volcanion and the Mechanical Marvel	She is the princess of the Azoth Kingdom and the older sister of Prince Raleigh. Voiced by Riley Joseph in English and Mayu Matsuoka in Japanese.
Princess Irene	The Princess and the Goblin	Voiced by Sally Ann Marsh.
Princess Daria	The Princess and the Pea	Voiced by Amanda Waring.
Princess Arîte	Princess Arete	The titular character in the 2001 Japanese animated film. Voiced by Houko Kuwashima.
Princess Claire	The Princess Castle	A 1996 Golden Films film about a young girl who dreams of becoming a princess.
Lady Amalthea	The Last Unicorn (film)	The eponymous "last unicorn" who, in her search for the other unicorns, is transformed into a young woman, learns about regret & love, and the love interest of Prince Lir. She is voiced by Mia Farrow.
Princess Lillifee	Prinzessin Lillifee	The titular character in the 2009 German animated film. Princess Lillifee is the fairy Princess who rules the kingdom of Pinkovia. Lillifee also appears in the film's 2011 sequel, Prinzessin Lillifee und das kleine Einhorn. Voiced by Maresa Sedlmeier.
San	Princess Mononoke	A girl raised by wolves who is a princess by name, as she is called "Princess Mononoke" by the neighboring village people. Voiced by Yuriko Ishida in Japanese and by Claire Danes in the English dub.
Princess Malika	Princess of Rome	The film depicts the life of the Christian princess, Malika, mother-to-be of Muhammad al-Mahdi, the 12th Shia Imam, and granddaughter of Caesar of Rome.
Princesses Dawn and Eve	The Princess Twins of Legendale	Both voiced by Lalainia Lindbjerg.
C-Ko Kotobuki	Project A-Ko	C-Ko is the Fourth Princess from the Lepton Kingdom of Alpha Cygni and the long-lost daughter of the Fifth Queen.
Alessandra Bellagamba	Puss in Boots: The Three Diablos	She is the princess of Italy whose "Heart of Fire" Ruby, the crown jewel, has been missing. Voiced by Charlotte Newhouse.
Kayley	Quest for Camelot	Despite not being a princess by birth nor by marriage, Kayley holds an honorary title as a Knight of the Round Table. She is voiced by Jessalyn Gilsig, while her singing voice is provided by Andrea Corr.
Princess Akhesa	La Reine Soleil	Voiced by Coralie Vanderlinden
Princess Zeila	La Rosa di Bagdad	The niece of Caliph Omen III of Baghdad. Voiced by Julie Andrews in English, and by Germana Calderini (speaking) and Beatrice Preziosa (singing) in Italian.
Solar Sailor Princesses	Sailor Moon Eternal	Based on the Sailor Moon manga series, the Sailor Guardians reveal themselves to be Sailor Princesses, just like Usagi Tsukino/Princess Serenity and Chibiusa/Small Lady: Ami Mizuno/Princess Mercury, voiced by Hisako Kanemoto (Japanese) and Kate Higgins (English); Rei Hino/Princess Mars, voiced by Rina Satō (Japanese) and Cristina Vee (English); Makoto Kino/Princess Jupiter, voiced by Ami Koshimizu (Japanese) and Amanda C. Miller (English); Minako Aino/Princess Venus, voiced by Shizuka Itō (Japanese) and Cherami Leigh (English); Setsuna Meiou/Princess Pluto, voiced by Ai Maeda (Japanese) and Veronica Taylor (English); Haruka Tenou/Princess Uranus, voiced by Junko Minagawa (Japanese) and Erica Mendez (English); Michiru Kaiou/Princess Neptune, voiced by Sayaka Ohara (Japanese) and Lauren Landa (English); Hotaru Tomoe/Princess Saturn, voiced by Yukiyo Fujii (Japanese) and Christine Marie Cabanos (English)
Princess Snow Kaguya	Sailor Moon S: The Movie	1994 Japanese animated film adapted from a side story of the Sailor Moon manga series, The Lover of Princess Kaguya, which is based on the Hans Christian Andersen fairy tale "The Snow Queen". The name "Princess Kaguya" comes from the Japanese legend The Tale of the Bamboo Cutter. Voiced by Eiko Masuyama in Japanese and Linda Ballantyne in English.
Fairy Princess Willow	Scooby-Doo! and the Goblin King	Voiced by Hayden Panettiere.
Princess Malta	The Sea Prince and the Fire Child	She is the daughter and heir of the Fire Goddess Themis of the Fire Kingdom. Voiced by Mami Koyama.
Princess Fiona	Shrek	Princess Fiona is initially portrayed as the archetypal princess from fairy tales, speaking formally in matters of courtship and presenting high expectations of how she is to be rescued, who is to rescue her, and so forth. She seems to give off an air of prissiness and even snobbery, which is shown to be out of her concern for breaking her curse, which she is ashamed of. Later, her true self emerges, as she is in reality a down-to-earth and independent woman who is an expert in hand-to-hand combat and has knowledge of Japanese martial arts. Like Shrek, she has bad manners since she is, for part of the time at first, an ogre. However, she is much more well-mannered to her parents. Princess Fiona is voiced by Cameron Diaz.
Lady Marina	Sinbad: Legend of the Seven Seas	A Thracian princess to a fictional Syracuse, Proteus's ex-fiancé, and Sinbad's love interest. She is voiced by Catherine Zeta-Jones.
Princess Nefia	Sinbad	The daughter of King Jamaal of Salabat. The Golden Films version of the tale of Sinbad the Sailor.
Princess Serena	Sinbad: Beyond the Veil of Mists	Voiced by Jennifer Hale.
Meechee	Smallfoot	Meechee is the daughter of the Yeti Village chief called the Stonekeeper. She is voiced by Zendaya.
The Princess	The Snow Queen	Tatiana Linnik in the 1957 Soviet animated film.; Scarlett Strallen in the 1995 British animated film.; Erin Fitzgerald in the 2012 Russian 3D-animated film.; Based on the Hans Christian Andersen fairy tale of the same name.
Marina	Hans Christian Andersen's The Little Mermaid (1975 film)	She is voiced by Fumie Kashiyama while her singing voice is Kumiko Ōsugi in Japanese. She is voiced by Kirsten Bishopric in the English version.
Princess Mindy	The SpongeBob SquarePants Movie	Voiced by Scarlett Johansson.
Princess Mila	The Stolen Princess	Voiced by Nadya Dorofeeva.
Princess Dawn	Strange Magic	Princess of the Fairy Kingdom. Voiced by Meredith Bull.
Princess Marianne	Strange Magic	Dawn's older sister. Voiced by Evan Rachel Wood.
Princess Kiara	Super K – The Movie (Kiara the Brave)	Voiced by Pamela L. Houle.
Princess Odette	The Swan Princess	She is voiced by Michelle Nicastro, while her singing voice is provided by Liz Callaway
Princess Alise	The Swan Princess: A Royal Family Tale	Alise is the adopted daughter of Princess Odette and Prince Derek. Voiced by Carley Fogelson
Princess Sweet Sea	Sweet Sea (TV Movie 1985)	The mermaid princess of King and Queen Neptune of the Coral Kingdom and the older sister of Princess Baby Brooke. She is voiced by Anne Marie McEvoy.
Princess Lilli	Tabaluga (Ice Princess Lily)	The ice princess of Iceland. Voiced by Yvonne Catterfeld in German and Mackenzie Ziegler in English.
Princess Pea	The Tale of Despereaux	2008 film based on Kate DiCamillo's 2003 Newbery Medal-winning novel of the same name. Voiced by Emma Watson.
Princess Kaguya	The Tale of the Princess Kaguya	Voiced by Chloë Grace Moretz in English and Aki Asakura in Japanese.
Princess Yum-Yum	The Thief and the Cobbler (The Princess and the Cobbler)	She is voiced in the original version by Hilary Pritchard, by Jennifer Beals in the Miramax version, Bobbi Page in the Majestic Films version. In re-edited versions, Andrea Robinson provides Yum-Yum's singing voice.
Princess Poppy	Trolls franchise	The former princess, and now queen, of the Trolls. Voiced by Anna Kendrick.
Elle de Rosenbach	Urusei Yatsura: Only You	She is an alien princess, like Lum and Kurama, who is in charge of the Planet Elle and has to marry Ataru after their "shadow tag" during their childhood. Voiced by Shiori as a child and Yoshiko Sakakibara as an adult in Japanese, and by Kristen Foster in the English dub.
Princess Rosa	The Wonderful World of Puss 'n Boots	Voiced by Rumi Sakakibara in Japanese and Corinne Orr in English.
Sheeta	Castle in the Sky	Voiced by Keiko Yokozawa in Japanese and Louise Chambell in English.

== Television ==
=== Live action ===
Princess	Series title	Notes
Princess Millicent von Schlepp	The Addams Family	Gomez's aunt who "married a Prince von Schlepp". Her husband was poor, and squandered all of her money before his death. Portrayed by Elvia Allman.
Princess Aouda	Around the World in 80 Days	1989 NBC miniseries based on Jules Verne's novel of the same name. Portrayed by Julia Nickson.
Liuying	Ashes of Love	The Demon Princess. Portrayed by Chen Yuqi.
Suihe	Ashes of Love	The Princess of the Bird Tribe and the Peacock immortal. Portrayed by Wang Yifei.
Princess Brendar	The Barbarian and the Troll	A fierce warrior princess who is on a quest to avenge an attack on her family. Performed by Spencer Grammer.
Miranda	BBC Television Shakespeare	Portrayed by Pippa Guard in the episode "The Tempest".
Princess Susannah, Duchess of Beaumont	Black Mirror	In the 2011 episode "The National Anthem", she is kidnapped by artist Carlton Bloom, who forces Prime Minister Michael Callow to engage in sexual intercourse with a pig as a condition for her safe return. Portrayed by Lydia Wilson.
Princess Multiwa/Archerina	Chōriki Sentai Ohranger/Power Rangers Zeo	Voiced by Miho Yamada in Chōriki Sentai Ohranger and Melora Harte in Power Rangers Zeo.
Princess Brea	The Dark Crystal: Age of Resistance	She is the princess of the Gelfling Vapra Clan, the third-born daughter of the queen All-Maudra Mayrin and the younger sister of Princesses Seladon and Katavra. Voiced by Anya Taylor-Joy and performed by Alice Dinnean.
Pardijn	De Magische Wereld van Pardoes	In this Dutch TV series, Pardijn is the princess of the fictional planet Symbolica and a good friend of the protagonist Pardoes. She is portrayed by Emilie Pos.
Beatriz Reyes-Montilla (aka Dyesebel)	Dyesebel	The titular protagonist of the series. She is a princess who is part mermaid and part human, being the daughter of the merprince Tino and human Lucia Reyes. Portrayed by Ashley Sarmiento as a child and Anne Curtis as a young woman.
Princess Coralia	Dyesebel	The daughter of the evil Queen Dyangga and one of the main antagonists of the series. She and her mother seek to reclaim what is rightfully theirs. Portrayed by Brenna Garcia as a child and Bangs Garcia as a young woman.
Alexandra "Alex" Wilson	The Elephant Princess	Princess of Manjipoor. Portrayed by Emily Robins.
Princess Indie	Eureeka's Castle	Princess of Eureeka's Castle. Performed by Eleanor Martin.
Princess Stella	Fate: The Winx Saga	Princess of Solaria. Portrayed by Hannah van der Westhuysen.
Princess Irulan	Frank Herbert's Dune	Eldest daughter of the 81st Padishah Emperor Shaddam IV and Anirul. Elder sister of Chalice, Wensicia, Josifa, and Rugi. Portrayed by Julie Cox.
Princess Wensicia	Frank Herbert's Dune	Third daughter of the 81st Padishah Emperor Shaddam IV and Anirul. Sister of Irulan, Chalice, Josifa, and Rugi. Portrayed by Susan Sarandon.
Isabella	The Fuccons	The young princess of the Blueberry Kingdom, who was formerly betrothed to Mikey Fuccon. Voiced by Mitsuki Mori in Japanese and Nancy Novotny in English.
Princess Isabella	Galavant	Princess Isabella Maria Lucia Elizabetta of Valencia. Portrayed by Karen David.
Myrcella Baratheon	Game of Thrones	Princess of House Baratheon of King's Landing. Legal daughter of King Robert Baratheon, biological daughter of Cersei and Jaime Lannister, and sister of Kings Joffrey and Tommen. Betrothed to Prince Trystane of Dorne. Portrayed in Seasons 1 and 2 by Aimee Richardson, and in Seasons 5 and 6 by Neil Tiger Free.
Shireen Baratheon	Game of Thrones	Daughter of Stannis Baratheon, disputed King of Westeros, and his wife, Selyse Florent. Portrayed by Kerry Ingram.
Elia Martell	Game of Thrones	Sister of Prince Doran Martell of Dorne and Prince Oberyn, who is mentioned in the series.
Daenerys Targaryen	Game of Thrones	Daughter of Aerys II Targaryen and Rhaella; younger sister of Rhaegar and Viserys Targaryen. Wife of Khal Drogo, and mother of their stillborn son, Rhaego. Known as the Mother of Dragons and Khaleesi of the Great Grass Sea. Portrayed by Emilia Clarke.
Rhaenys Targaryen	Game of Thrones	Daughter of Rhaegar Targaryen and Elia Martellm and niece of Daenerys Targaryen, who is mentioned in the series.
Alexis Davis	General Hospital	Daughter of Greco-Russian prince Mikkos Cassadine and his mistress, Swedish opera singer Kristin Bergman. Portrayed by Nancy Lee Grahn, briefly by Susan Diol, and by Kristen Erickson as a teenager.
Princess Ial (Mio)	Hikari Sentai Maskman	Princess Ial of the Underground Empire Tube. Portrayed by Mina Asami.
"Prince" Igam	Hikari Sentai Maskman	Prince Igam of the Underground Empire Tube and twin sister of Princess Ial. He is a major villain later revealed to be a woman. Also portrayed by Mina Asami.
Princess SummerFallWinterSpring	Howdy Doody	Member of the fictional Tinka Tonka tribe. She was portrayed by actress Judy Tyler and a marionette.
Lan Shang	Ice Fantasy	The mermaid princess of the Mermaid Tribe. Portrayed by Madina Memet.
Nan Xing	Ice Fantasy	The third princess of the Ice Tribe. Portrayed by Wang Yitong.
Qian Ying	Ice Fantasy	The Princess Consort of the Ice Tribe. Portrayed by Li Sheng.
Xing Gui	Ice Fantasy	The princess of the Dream Tribe. Portrayed by Xu Jiao.
Xue Mi	Ice Fantasy	The fourth princess of the Ice Tribe. Portrayed by Ou Xianru.
Yan Da	Ice Fantasy	The princess of the Fire Tribe. Portrayed by Alina Zhang Meng.
Princess Lee Jae-shin	The King 2 Hearts	The princess of South Korea, the daughter of Queen Bang Yang-seon and the younger sister of King Lee Jae-kang and Crown Prince Lee Jae-ha. Portrayed by Lee Yoon-ji.
Princess Ciara	Knight Squad	She is secretly the princess of Astoria who uses a special ring to disguise herself in order to attend knight school and be a part of Phoenix Squad. Portrayed by Daniella Perkins.
Princess Eliza	Knight Squad	She is Ciara's older sister who gives her a special ring and leads the royal army in fighting Ryker, the former king of Astoria. Portrayed by Sydney Park in the two-part episode "End of the Knight".
Princess Jarmin	Kousoku Sentai Turboranger	The Demon Princess. Portrayed by Kanako Kishi.
Mei	Kyōryū Sentai Zyuranger	Princess of the Risha tribe. Portrayed by Reiko Chiba.
Princess Corah of Caddock	Legend of the Seeker	Season 1, Episode 19: "Cursed" Corah is first introduced as the daughter of King Gregor of Caddock. She later becomes Queen of Caddock. Portrayed by Beatrice Joblin.
Princess Loralyn of Thryce	Legend of the Seeker	Character in the TV series adaptation of Terry Goodkind's Sword of Truth series; Season 2, Episode 13: "Princess"
Queen Milena of Tamarang	Legend of the Seeker	Previously Princess Milena of Tamarang. Character in the TV series adaptation of Terry Goodkind's Sword of Truth series. Portrayed by Geraldine Brophy; 1 Episode (1.9): "Puppeteer".
Princess Violet of Tamarang	Legend of the Seeker	Portrayed by Maisy McLeod-Riera, daughter of New Zealand actress Sarah McLeod; 1 Episode (1.9): "Puppeteer".
Princess Montivano	Little Princess	Portrayed by Jo Berry.
Sara Crewe	A Little Princess	Multiple television adaptations of Frances Hodgson Burnett's novel have been made. Some notable examples include: A Little Princess (1973), lost mini-series starring Deborah Makepeace.; A Little Princess (1986), mini-series starring Amelia Shankley.; Princess Sarah (2007), teleserye starring Sharlene San Pedro.
Princess Mabushina	Mashin Sentai Kiramager	She is the princess, and later crowned queen, of the Land of Jewels Crystallia who was very close to and fond of her foster brother Takamichi; the daughter of the late King Oradin and Queen Mabayuine. Voiced by Inori Minase.
Princess Elena	Merlin	The daughter of Lord Godwyn. Portrayed by Georgia King; 1 Episode: "The Changeling" (2010).
Princess Mithian	Merlin	Princess of Nemeth and daughter of King Rodor. Portrayed by Janet Montgomery; 2 Episodes: "The Hunter's Heart" (2011) and "Another's Sorrow" (2012).
Lady Morgana Pendragon	Merlin	Lady Morgana is introduced as the ward of Uther Pendragon, and is later revealed to be Uther's daughter through a tryst with Morgana's mother while her mother's husband, Gorlois, was away. While in Arthurian legend the character of Morgan LeFay, on whom Lady Morgana is based, is commonly depicted as the half-sister of Arthur through their mother, Igraine, in the Merlin television series they are related through Uther. She is portrayed by Katie McGrath.
Lady Vivian	Merlin	Daughter of King Olaf. Portrayed by Georgia Tennant; 1 Episode (2.10): "Sweet Dreams" (2010).
Lee Seol	My Princess	The great-granddaughter of the last Emperor of the Joseon dynasty. Portrayed by Kim Tae-hee.
Princess Deirdre	Mystic Knights of Tir Na Nog	Mystic Knight of Air. Portrayed by Lisa Dwan.
Princess Locke	The New Legends of Monkey	Portrayed by Bryony Skillington.
Princess Abigail/Kathryn Nolan	Once Upon A Time	Daughter of King Midas in the fairy tale world. Portrayed by Anastasia Griffith.
Princess Aurora	Once Upon A Time	Portrayed by Sarah Bolger.
Cora Mills	Once Upon A Time	The Queen of Hearts and the mother of Regina Mills and Zelena/The Wicked Witch of the West. Born a miller's daughter, she becomes a princess when she marries Prince Henry, the son of King Xavier. The older Cora is portrayed by Barbara Hershey, the younger by Rose McGowan.
Queen Eva	Once Upon A Time	Previously Princess Eva. First wife of King Leopold and Snow White's mother. Portrayed by Eva Bourne (credited as Eva Allan) as a young princess and by Rena Sofer as an adult.
Rapunzel	Once Upon A Time	Portrayed by Alexandra Metz.
Regina Mills	Once Upon A Time	Also known as The Evil Queen, she is daughter of Cora and Prince Henry. She later becomes Queen as the second wife of King Leopold; step-mother of Snow White. Portrayed by Lana Parrilla.
Snow White/Mary Margaret Blanchard	Once Upon A Time	Daughter of King Leopold and Queen Eva, wife of Prince "Charming" David in the fairy tale world and mother of Emma Swan. Portrayed by Ginnifer Goodwin as an adult, and by Bailee Madison as a child.: Her daughter, Emma Swan (portrayed by Jennifer Morrison), should be a princess, but since she was brought up in the real world, she is technically not. However, David does refer to Emma as a princess in "Where Bluebirds Fly"
Princess Anna of Arendelle	Once Upon A Time	Portrayed by Elizabeth Lail.
Ingrid the Snow Queen	Once Upon A Time	Formerly Princess Ingrid of Arendelle, Ingrid is the main antagonist on the first half of the fourth season of ABC's Once Upon a Time. She débuts in the second episode of the fourth season. She is portrayed by guest star Elizabeth Mitchell as an adult and by Brighton Sharbino as a child.
Princess Helga of Arendelle	Once Upon A Time	Helga is the second child with Ingrid and Gerda as her sisters. She is portrayed by guest star Sally Pressman as an adult and by Bailey Herbert as a child.
Princess Gerda of Arendelle	Once Upon A Time	Gerda is the third child who inherits the throne and is the mother of Elsa and Anna. Portrayed by Pascale Hutton as an adult and by Ava Marie Telek as a child.
Ursula	Once Upon A Time	One of the three Queens of Darkness. She is a former mermaid, the daughter of the Sea King Poseidon. Portrayed by Merrin Dungey as an adult, and by Tiffany Boone as a young mermaid.
Princess Eleanor	The Palace	The first daughter of the widowed Queen Charlotte and the older sister of Prince George and Princess Isabelle, Eleanor is jealous of her first younger brother Richard IV taking over the throne after the death of her father, King James III. Portrayed by Sophie Winkleman.
Princess Isabelle	The Palace	Eleanor and Richard's younger sister who is an A-Level student. Portrayed by Nathalie Lunghi.
Princess Areeyah Wangchuck/Mikay Maghirang-Dela Rosa	Princess and I	The long-lost crown princess of Yangdon who was adopted by the family of Maghirang; the daughter of King Anand and Queen Isabel Wangchuck. Portrayed by Kathryn Bernardo.
Princess Dollie Suri	Princess Dollie Aur Uska Magic Bag	Portrayed by Karishma Randhawa.
Shin Chae-kyeong	Princess Hours	2006 South Korean television series based on the manhwa Goong. Portrayed by Yoon Eun-hye.
Lady Hwa-young	Princess Hours	She was formerly the Crown Princess. Portrayed by Shim Hye-jin.
Princess Hye-myung	Princess Hours	Portrayed by Lee Yoon-ji.
Feng Xin'er/Li Weiyoung	The Princess Weiyoung	The princess of Northern Liang, the daughter of King Hexi and granddaughter of Queen Dowager. Portrayed by Tiffany Tang.
Princess Georgina "Georgy" De La Rue	Princesses	A recently widowed English princess (and former showgirl) who arrives in the United States to challenge her late husband's contested will. Portrayed by Twiggy (credited as Twiggy Lawson).
Princess Georgiana	Queen of Oz	The scandalous black sheep of a fictional British royal family who has spent her spoilt life partying and being plastered all over the tabloids. She then becomes the Queen of Australia after her mother unexpectedly abdicates the Australian throne in her favour, hoping to send her away from London and make her someone else's problem. Portrayed by Catherine Tate.
Evil Spirit Princess Venus	Rescue Sentai GoGoFive	Portrayed by Kaya Hirasawa.
Princess Eleanor Henstridge	The Royals	The princess of England, daughter of King Simon and Queen Helena Henstridge and twin sister of Prince Liam Henstridge. Portrayed by Alexandra Park.
Princess Maribel Henstridge	The Royals	The younger daughter of Prince Cyrus Henstridge. Portrayed by Hatty Preston (season 1) and Jerry-Jane Pears (season 2).
Princess Penelope Henstridge	The Royals	The first daughter of Prince Cyrus Henstridge and the older sister of Maribel. Portrayed by Lydia Rose Bewley.
Princess Emily	Scandal	She was the wife of Prince Richard and the princess of Caledonia who died in a car crash. She appeared in season 5, episode 1 "Heavy Is the Head" and was portrayed by Hilty Bowen.
Amberle Elessedil	The Shannara Chronicles	Elven princess, and the first female to be accepted as one of the Chosen. Portrayed by Poppy Drayton.
Vulcan Princess	Star Trek	The mother of Spock's paternal half-brother Sybok.
Koriand'r / Kory Anders / Starfire	Titans	A super-powered alien princess, who comes to Earth seeking asylum. She ultimately crosses paths with and becomes a member of the Titans. Portrayed by Anna Diop.
Sookie Stackhouse	True Blood	Based on the book series of The Southern Vampire Mysteries by Charlaine Harris. Portrayed by Anna Paquin.
Vasilisa "Lissa" Dragomir	Vampire Academy	2022 original Peacock series based on Richelle Mead's young adult novel series of the same name. Portrayed by Daniela Nieves.
Princess Gisla	Vikings	Daughter of Emperor Charles; later marries Rollo, Duke of Normandy (Rollo Lothbrok). Based on the historical or legendary Gisela of France. Portrayed by Morgane Polanski.
Princess Judith	Vikings	Daughter of King Aelle and Queen Ealhswith of Northumbria and the wife of Prince Aethelwulf. She has a legitimate son with Aethelwulf, Prince Aethelred, and an illegitimate one with Athelstan, Alfred. Based on the historical Judith of Flanders. Portrayed by Sarah Greene in season 2 and Jennie Jacques since season 3.
Kwenthrith	Vikings	Pretender to the throne of Mercia, and sister of Prince Burgred. She has a putative illegitimate son, Magnus, with Ragnar. Based on the historical Cwenthryth. Portrayed by Amy Bailey.
Zhao Jiayi	A Weaver on the Horizon	Orphaned daughter of the late Emperor Lizong of Song, niece and ward of Wang Gang, Emperor Duzong of Song. She is known as Princess Jiayi. Portrayed by Cecilia Liu.
Cirilla Fiona Elen Riannon	The Witcher	Based on the novel series of the same name by Andrzej Sapkowski, Ciri is portrayed by Freya Allan. She also appears in the 2001 film The Hexer, portrayed by Marta Bitner.
Princess Lexi	Wizards vs Aliens	She is the princess of the Nekross aliens and the younger sister of the King Regent Varg. Portrayed by Gwendoline Christie.
Princess Tizz	The Wubbulous World of Dr. Seuss	The princess of the Kingdom of Didd and the daughter of King Derwin. Performed by Leslie Carrara-Rudolph.
Gabrielle	Xena: Warrior Princess	A warrior, bard, Amazon princess, and later Amazon queen. She is referred to by fans of the show as the "Battling Bard of Potidaea". Portrayed by Renee O'Connor.
Princess Siwan	Yanxi Palace: Princess Adventure	Portrayed by Xu Xiaonuo.
Princess Zhaohua	Yanxi Palace: Princess Adventure	Daughter of Emperor Qianlong and Wei Yingluo, Consort Ling. Her father is the emperor of the Qing dynasty. Portrayed by Wang Herun.
Princess Juliana of Bulgaria	Year of the Rabbit	She is a perpetrator of the kidnapping of her brother Prince Hector of Bulgaria; the member of 'the Vision', the secret organisation. Portrayed by Sally Phillips.

=== Animated ===
Princess	Series title	Notes
Princess Bubblegum	Adventure Time	Princess of the Candy Kingdom. Voiced primarily by Hynden Walch, Isabella Acres and Livvy Stubenrauch when turned younger, and by Paige Moss in the original pilot short. While Princess Bubblegum is the most prominent princess in the princess-laden Adventure Time comics and television show, there are many others: Breakfast Princess; Cotton Candy Princess; Dr. Princess; Emerald Princess; Engagement Ring Princess; Flame Princess, voiced by Jessica DiCicco.; Ghost Princess; Hot Dog Princess; Lumpy Space Princess, voiced by Pendleton Ward.; Purple Princess; Raggedy Princess; Slime Princess; Turtle Princess; Wildberry Princess
Marceline the Vampire Queen	Adventure Time	Princess Marceline is the self-proclaimed "Vampire Queen". However, she is also the daughter of the still living ruler of Nightosphere.
Alicia Charlotte	Aikatsu Friends! Brilliant Jewel	She is a princess from the Solvette kingdom and an idol, whom Hibiki Tenshō forms Friends with. Voiced by Saori Ōnishi.
Princess Julienne	All Hail King Julien	She is the ring-tailed lemur who is a princess of the Lemur Kingdom in Madagascar, the sister of Uncle King Julien and the mother of King Julien XIII. Voiced by Anjelica Huston.
Princess Gertrude	Altair: A Record of Battles	She is the second princess of the Urado Kingdom and one of the four daughters of King Zsigmond III, who is the cabinet minister to formerly the Balt-Rhein Empire and later the Cuore and South Rumeliana. Voiced by Juri Kimura.
Princess Margit	Altair: A Record of Battles	She is the youngest of King Zsigmond's four daughters who is the cabinet minister of negotiations for Greater Türkiye and a spy for Zağanos's spy network. Voiced by Megumi Han.
Princess Azula	Avatar: The Last Airbender	She was the Princess of the Fire Nation. Her mother, Princess Ursa, appears in several flashbacks. Voiced by Grey DeLisle.
Princess Yue	Avatar: The Last Airbender	She was the Princess of the Northern Water Tribe who was given life by the moon spirit, only to give it back when the moon spirit was killed in its fish form. She is voiced by Johanna Braddy.
Fabia Sheen	Bakugan Battle Brawlers	She is the Princess of Neathia and the younger sister of the former Queen Serena Sheen. Fabia later becomes the new Queen of Neathia in Bakugan: Mechtanium Surge.
Charlotte Beatrix Marie Rhody Wyndham	Berserk	She was formerly the princess of Midland.
Nunnally vi Britannia	Code Geass	Voiced by Kaori Nazuka in Japanese and Rebecca Forstadt in English.
Cornelia li Britannia	Code Geass	Second Princess of the Holy Britannian Empire and Commander-in-Chief of the Imperial Army. Voiced by Junko Minagawa in Japanese and Mary Elizabeth McGlynn in English.
Euphemia li Britannia	Code Geass	Third Princess of the Holy Britannian Empire. Voiced by Omi Minami in Japanese and Michelle Ruff in English.
Jiang Lihua (Tianzi)	Code Geass	Young Empress of the Chinese Federation, who she is sometimes referred to as a "puppet princess". Voiced by Tamaki Matsumoto in Japanese and Jessica Straus in English.
Angelise "Ange" Ikaruga Misurugi	Cross Ange	Ange is a former princess of the Empire of Misurugi and the main heroine who is considered a "Norma" and has been exiled to the island of Arzenal. She is the daughter of the late Emperor Jurai and Empress Sophia and the sister of Emperor Julio and Princess Sylvia. Voiced by Nana Mizuki in Japanese and Emily Neves in English.
Misty Rosenblum	Cross Ange	She is a princess from the neighboring Kingdom of Rosenblum who is one of opposing teams that Ange competes with. Voiced by Mariya Ise in Japanese and Amanda L. Baird in English.
Salamandinay	Cross Ange	She is the princess from the Freya DRAGON clan who pilots Enryugo the Ryu-Shing-Ki mecha and is capable of controlling the other DRAGONs with the song called "El Ragna". Voiced by Yui Horie in Japanese and Juliet Simmons in English.
Princess Dorathea	Danny Phantom	A ghost princess who transforms into a dragon. Voiced by Grey DeLisle and Susan Blakeslee.
Princess Bean	Disenchantment	Princess Tiabeanie Mariabeanie De La Rochambeaux Grunkowitz, commonly known as "Bean", is the irresponsible and bisexual princess of Dreamland. She is the daughter of King Zøg and Queen Dagmar, the stepdaughter of Queen Oona, and the half-sister of Prince Derek. Voiced by openly bisexual actress Abbi Jacobson.
Princess Persephone	Doc McStuffins	Also known simply as Peri, she is a toy princess who is very athletic and hyper. Persephone appears in the episode "Sir Kirby and the Plucky Princess" and is voiced by Geena Davis.
Millhiore Firianno Biscotti	Dog Days	The 13-year-old princess of Biscotti Republic. Voiced by Yui Horie.
Princess Marie Ange	DokiDoki! PreCure	Also known as Princess Marie Angelica in Saban's Glitter Force dub. She is the princess of the Trump Kingdom.
The Princess	Dora and Friends: Into the City!	She appeared in the episode "The Royal Ball" and was voiced by Raquel Wallace.
Princess Maribel	Dora and Friends: Into the City!	Appearing in the episode "The Princess and the Kate", she is the doppelgänger of Kate whom she trades places with for a day. Both she and Kate are voiced by Isabela Moner.
Princess Xochitl	Dora and Friends: Into the City!	She appears in the episode "The Magic Ring". Voiced by Jessica Conde.
Puppy Princess	Dora and Friends: Into the City!	Princess of the Doggie Land, who appears in the episode "Puppy Princess Rescue". Voiced by Jamie Cantome.
The Princess	Dora the Explorer	She appears in the episode "Dora's Knighthood Adventure". Voiced by Sofia Singer.
Sabrina the Snow Princess	Dora the Explorer	The princess of the Snowy Forest. She first appears in the episode "Dora Saves the Snow Princess". Voiced by Jessica Conde.
Chi-Chi	Dragon Ball	She is the daughter of the Ox-King of Frypan Mountain and the wife of Son Goku.
Princess Nell	Dragon Goes House-Hunting	Princess Andriana Ellen Croixdea Margarethe Emmalyn Narsham Felna, commonly known as Nell. Voiced by Misato Fukuen in Japanese and Jad Saxton in English.
Princess Clara	Drawn Together	Clara, voiced by Tara Strong, is a parody of Disney Princesses, specifically Ariel (The Little Mermaid) and Belle (Beauty and the Beast). She also appears in the animated film adaptation, The Drawn Together Movie: The Movie!.
Fatora Venus	El-Hazard	She is the second princess of Roshtaria.
Rune Venus	El-Hazard	She is the first princess of Roshtaria and older sister of Fatora.
Princess Caterina	Elena of Avalor	The daughter of King Joaquín and Queen Teresa of Cariza. She appeared in the episode "Olaball" and was voiced by Marsai Martin.
Princess Elena	Elena of Avalor	Crown princess of Avalor, full name Elena Castillo Flores. Daughter of the late King Raul and Queen Lucia of Avalor, and the older sister of Princess Isabel. Elena debuted in Disney Junior's Sofia the First. Voiced by Aimee Carrero.
Princess Marisa	Elena of Avalor	The crown princess of the Sirena kingdom of Coronado, daughter of King Pescoro and Queen Camila and the sister of Crown Prince Marzel. She appeared in the hour-long special "Song of the Sirenas" and was voiced by Gina Rodriguez and Gia Lopez (young).
Princess Valentina	Elena of Avalor	Princess Valentina Montańez Torres of Parìso. She appeared in the episode "Royal Rivalry" and was voiced by Chrissie Fit.
Princess Lalala	The Emperor's New School	Appearing in one episode "The Bride of Kuzco", Lalala is a serious princess who Emperor Kuzco does not want to marry, leading her to be turned into a frog by Yzma until she changes back thanks to the mistake of Kronk. She was voiced by Teresa Ganzel.
Rona Pricipa O'Lapanesta	Endro!	She is the princess of the Lapanesta kingdom. Voiced by Momo Asakura in Japanese and Amber Lee Connors in English.
Princess Hyatt	Excel Saga	In the anime series, Hyatt is a mysterious princess supposedly from space who has a connection to the Puuchuus and Space Butler and serves as the frail junior officer of Excel. Voiced by Omi Minami in Japanese and Monica Rial in English.
Princess Niamh	Faeries	The daughter of the King of Faery Land. Based on the book of the same name by Brian Froud and Alan Lee. Voiced by Morgan Brittany.
Princess Mandie ("Man-DIE")	The Fairly OddParents	Voiced by Tara Strong.
Carla	Fairy Tail	Also known as Charles in Japanese, she is a white-furred cat who is the Exceed princess and can assume a humanoid form.
Hisui E. Fiore	Fairy Tail	Hisui E. Fiore is the princess, and now queen, of Fiore and the daughter of King Toma E. Fiore.
Anelle	Fantastic Four; The Super Hero Squad Show	A Skrull princess; the animated version of the Marvel Comics character.: Fantastic Four: "Behold, A Distant Star", voiced by Mary Kay Bergman.; The Super Hero Squad Show: "Another Order of Evil!", voiced by Tara Strong.
Fena Houtman	Fena: Pirate Princess	Fena is an orphaned princess who, as a pirate captain, recruits a group of seven elite samurai called the Samurai Seven to help her on her voyage. She is the only child of the King of England but has been adopted by the late Franz Houtman, the nobleman, and Helena des Armoises, the former maiden. Voiced by Asami Seto in Japanese and Brittany Cox in English.
Lisa Pacifist	Final Fantasy: Unlimited	She is the Tsarevna and heir of Russia who acts as a protector of the twins Ai and Yu Hayakawa. Voiced by Kyōko Hikami (Japanese) and Shawn Sides (English).
Princess Florrie	Florrie's Dragons	Based on the children's book series Dear Dragon by Margaret Hillert. Voiced by Lara Wollington.
May Chang	Fullmetal Alchemist: Brotherhood	The princess of the fictional country of Xing and the sister of Prince Lin Yao. Voiced by Monica Rial in English and Mai Goto in Japanese.
Lulun	Futari wa Pretty Cure Max Heart	She is the Princess of the Garden of Light and the younger sister of Prince Pollun.
Princess Goleeta	Galtar and the Golden Lance	The princess of Bandisar. Voiced by Mary McDonald-Lewis.
Princess Finella	Gargoyles	Princess of Scotland. Voiced by Sheena Easton.
Princess Katharine	Gargoyles	Granddaughter of Malcolm I of Scotland by his son, Prince Malcolm, and the Norman Princess Elena. Voiced by Kath Soucie.
Piña Co Lada	Gate	The 19-year-old princess of the Empire who is dedicated to its welfare; the younger half-sister of Prince Zorzal El Caesar. Voiced by Jessica Boone in English and Haruka Tomatsu in Japanese.
Princess Gwendolyn	Gawayn	She is a rightful but deposed ruler whose evil Duke of Amaraxos shrinks her to take over her kingdom.
Falanya Elk Arbalest	The Genius Prince's Guide to Raising a Nation Out of Debt	She is the princess of the Kingdom of Natra who studies politics. She is the daughter of the late King Natra Owen and younger sister of Crown Prince Wein. Voiced by Sayaka Senbongi in Japanese and Amber Lee Connors in English.
Lowellmina "Lowa" Earthworld	The Genius Prince's Guide to Raising a Nation Out of Debt	She is the princess of the Earthworld Empire and the sister of Princes Demetrio, Bardloche and Manfred. Voiced by Nao Tōyama in Japanese and Alexis Tipton in English.
Towa Akagi	Go! Princess PreCure	The princess of the Hope Kingdom, whose alter ego is Cure Scarlet. She was formerly an antagonist of the series under the identity of Twilight.
Captain Victoria	Guardians of the Galaxy	She is the princess of the Spartax empire, the younger half-sister of Peter Quill / Star-Lord, and the daughter of Emperor J'son. Voiced by Cree Summer.
Rinda Farseer	Guin Saga	The crown princess of Parros, and the daughter of King Aldross III, who along with her twin brother Crown Prince Remus allies with the mysterious, amnesiac warrior Guin. She is voiced by Mai Nakahara in Japanese and Emily Neves in English.
Jane Klockenlocher	Hans Christian Andersen's The Emperor's New Clothes	Voiced by Imogene Coca, Jane is a princess of the Empire of Bibbentucker whose father Emperor Klockenlocher has been tricked by the wicked jester, Jasper, into putting on his "invisible suit" in the 1972 stop-motion special adaptation of Hans Christian Andersen's fairy tale of the same name.
Hime Shirayuki	HappinessCharge PreCure!	The princess of the Blue Sky Kingdom, whose alter ego is Cure Princess.
Charlotte "Charlie" Morningstar	Hazbin Hotel	Charlie is the princess of Hell, daughter of King Lucifer and Queen Lillith, and founder of the Hazbin Hotel. Voiced by Erika Henningsen.
Princess Dawn	Here Comes the Grump	Voiced by Stefanianna Christopherson.
Irina	The Heroic Legend of Arslan	She is the blind princess of the kingdom of Maryam in Lusitanian territory who lost her sight by illness but keeps her regal appearance. Voiced by Lindsay Seidel in English and Ai Kayano in Japanese.
Princess Flora	Honey Honey no Suteki na Bouken	The princess of Vienna and Honey Honey's older sister. Voiced by Fuyumi Shiraishi.
Princess Priscilla/Honey Honey	Honey Honey no Suteki na Bouken	The title character of the series who is a lost princess from a small Prussian country. Voiced by Minori Matsushima.
Jeanne Euphoria	How a Realist Hero Rebuilt the Kingdom	She is the crown princess of the Gran Chaos Empire and the commander of the imperial military. Jeanne is the younger sister of Empress Maria Euphoria. Voiced by Yui Ishikawa in Japanese and Michelle Rojas in English.
Liscia Elfrieden	How a Realist Hero Rebuilt the Kingdom	She is the tomboyish crown princess of the Kingdom of Elfrieden, daughter of King Albert and Queen Elisha Elfrieden, and the adoptive sister of Tomoe Inui. She becomes the first Primary Queen as one of the wives to Kazuya who becomes her kingdom's new king. Voiced by Inori Minase in Japanese and Anairis Quiñones in English.
Roroa Amidonia	How a Realist Hero Rebuilt the Kingdom	She is the princess from the former Principality of Amidonia, the daughter of the late Prince Gaius and the younger sister of Prince Julius Amidonia. She is the fourth Primary Queen as one of King Kazuya's wives. Voiced by M・A・O in Japanese and Jad Saxton in English.
Emilia Gudenburg/Emilia Hermit/Emile Crossfode	Hundred	The third princess from the Gudenburg Empire who initially disguises herself as a boy under the name Emile Crossfode. Voiced by Rumi Okubo in Japanese and Mikaela Krantz in English.
Hildegard "Hilde" Minas Lestia	In Another World with My Smartphone	Hilde is the princess from the Lestia Knight Kingdom who is known as "Knight Princess" due to her swordsmanship skills and has moved to the Duchy of Brunhild as Touya Mochizuki's seventh fiancée in the Bride Conference.
Lucia Leah Regulus	In Another World with My Smartphone	Lucia is the third princess from the Regulus Empire who Touya rescues her from the imperial army in the coup and whose father Emperor Zephyrus creates a truce with King Tristwin of Belfast, leading her to become Touya's fifth fiancée in the Bride Conference at the Duchy of Brunhild.
Yumina Ernea Belfast	In Another World with My Smartphone	Yumina is the princess of the Kingdom of Belfast, and the niece of Duke Alfred Ortlinde, who possesses "Mystic Eyes", an ability in which allows her to see a person's true nature, and forms the Bride Conference as she becomes Touya's first fiancée in her uncle's duchy of Brunhild. She is the daughter of King Tristwin and Queen Yuel.
Kaguya	Inuyasha the Movie: The Castle Beyond the Looking Glass	Kaguya, Princess of the Heavens. Moon Princess character in this second film of the Inuyasha film series.
Ecarlate Juptris St. Piria	Ixion Saga DT	She is a young princess of St. Piria who, despite being a child, is so mature that she has to marry Prince Nabokov Jugglaburk to bring peace to each other. Voiced by Shiori Mikami.
Ortfiné Fredericka von Eylstadt	Izetta: The Last Witch	Also known simply as Finé, she is the tomboyish crown princess and heir to the throne of the Duchy of Eylstadt. Voiced by Saori Hayami in Japanese and Mallorie Rodak in English.
Princess Serena	Jack and the Beanstalk	Voiced by Janet Waldo (speaking) and Marni Nixon (singing).
The Pirate Princess	Jake and the Never Land Pirates	Speaking voice by Tori Spelling, singing voice by Laura Dickinson.
Princess Winger	Jake and the Never Land Pirates	A bird princess from the island of the Sky Bird Kingdom. Voiced by Lisa Loeb.
Princess Yasmine	James Bond Jr.	She is the daughter of Sheikh Yabootie of Al-Khaline and one of the Bond girls in the episode "Valley of the Hungry Dunes". Voiced by Sheryl Bernstein.
Princess Lavinia Pernilla Kippernook	Jane and the Dragon	Based on the book series of the same name by Martin Baynton. Voiced by Isabel De Carteret.
Princess Hitei	Katanagatari	She is a princess who resides in Owari and the descendant of master swordsmith Kiki Shikizaki. Voiced by Haruka Tomatsu.
Princess Yōsha "Togame" Hida	Katanagatari	She is the ambitious strategist working for the shogunate, and the only daughter of the late feudal lord Takahito Hida. Voiced by Yukari Tamura.
Princess Lily	Kinnikuman	The princess of Planet Kinmoku and the older sister of Prince Cherry. Voiced by Minori Matsushima.
Princess Rona	Kirby: Right Back at Ya!	Appeared in the episode "A Princess in Dis-Dress"; voiced by Yuko Sasamoto in Japanese and Tara Sands in English.
Iris Belzerg Stylish Sword	KonoSuba	She is the first princess of the Kingdom of Belzerg who is proficient with swords, despite her young age. She is voiced by Kanon Takao in Japanese and by Lisa Reimold in English dub.
Princess Mei Li	Kung Fu Panda: Legends of Awesomeness	The Emperor's daughter whom Master Po has to escort but discovers that she would be given to Warrior-King Temutai of the Qidan clan as a servant in exchange for peace between the nations in the episode "The Princess and the Po". Voiced by Kari Wahlgren.
Greta	Kyo Kara Maoh!	She is the princess from the fallen kingdom of Zorashia and the biological daughter of the former Lady Izura. Voiced by Motoko Kumai (Japanese) and Rebecca Forstadt (English).
Pina Sformklan Estoh	Ladies versus Butlers!	She is a princess who is in the upper-ed class. Voiced by Mai Gotō in Japanese and Bryn Apprill in English.
Lady LovelyLocks	Lady Lovely Locks	The princess of the Kingdom of Lovelylocks and the titular protagonist of the series. Voiced by Tony St. Vincent.
Duchess RavenWaves	Lady Lovely Locks	The evil ruler of Tangleland and the archenemy of Lady LovelyLocks. Voiced by Louise Vallance.
Yurikano De Metrio Lu	Lagrange: The Flower of Rin-ne	She is the princess of De Metrio, and the younger sister of the former Prince Villagulio, who was presumed dead after a failed Vox Particle Control Experiment but has actually survived the experiment and has been rescued by Le Garite following the Tradegy of Militia Zodia. Voiced by Mariya Ise in Japanese and Carrie Keranen in English.
Liliana Il Grazioso Merlo Turan	Last Exile: Fam, the Silver Wing	The first princess of the Kingdom of Turan. Voiced by Jamie Marchi in English and Miyuki Sawashiro in Japanese.
Millia Il Velch Cutrettola Turan	Last Exile: Fam, the Silver Wing	The second princess of the Kingdom of Turan and one of the main characters of the series; the younger sister of Liliana. Voiced by Carrie Savage in English and Ai Kayano in Japanese.
Princess Eska	The Legend of Korra	Daughter of Chief Unalaq of the Northern Water Tribe and twin sister of Prince Desna; the cousin of Avatar Korra.
Aleta	The Legend of Prince Valiant	The Princess, and later Queen, of the Misty Isles; daughter of King Hugo. Voiced by Paige O'Hara.
Snow White	The Legend of Snow White	Daughter of King Conrad and Queen Isabelle of the Emerald Valley. Italian-Japanese anime series. Voiced by Yuri Amano.
Noa Ehn	The Legend of the Legendary Heroes	She is the former princess of the Estabul Kingdom, and the only daughter of King Ruwe Ehn, who senior statesman Claugh Klom has saved her from being killed during Miran Froaude's extermination exercise on the nobles. Voiced by Mikako Takahashi in Japanese and Colleen Clinkenbeard in English.
Princess Zelda	The Legend of Zelda	Based on the video game series of the same name. Voiced by Cyndy Preston.
Spryte	The Legend of Zelda	A fairy-princess who assists and accompanies Link and Princess Zelda. Voiced by Paulina Gillis.
Princess Corina	Little Charmers	The mermaid princess.
Ariel	The Little Mermaid	The youngest daughter of King Triton and Queen Athena. She is often rebellious, and in the first film longs to be a part of the human world. She marries Prince Eric, whom she rescued from a shipwreck, and together they have a daughter, Melody. Some of her sisters appear occasionally throughout the television series, most notably Arista, whom Ariel often quarrels with.: Attina; Alana; Adella; Aquata; Arista; Andrina
The Little Princess	Little Princess	Based on the original books of the same name by Tony Ross. Voiced by Jane Horrocks.
Raynesia El-Arte Cowen	Log Horizon	Also spelled "Lenessia Erhart Cowen", she is a member of the Corwen clan in the League of Freedom Cities Eastal. Voiced by Mariya Ise in Japanese and Emily Neves in English.
Auriana	LoliRock	She is the Princess of Volta.
Carissa	LoliRock	She is the Princess of Calix.
Iris	LoliRock	She is the Princess of Ephedia and the main character of the series.
Izira	LoliRock	She is the first Princess of Xeris.
Lyna	LoliRock	She is the Princess of Borealis.
Talia	LoliRock	She is the second Princess of Xeris and the younger sister of Izira.
Alea Golt/Pony Goodlight	Lost Song	The princess and heir of the kingdom of Golt who was originally thought be to be lost during war and later becomes the queen following the abdication of her cold-hearted brother Prince Rudo. Voiced by Chiaki Takahashi in Japanese and Reba Buhr in English.
Amalla Su	Love Hina	She is the first Princess of Molmol. Voiced by Wendee Lee in English and Aya Hisakawa in Japanese.
Kaolla Su	Love Hina	She is the second Princess of Molmol and Amalla's younger sister. Voiced by Wendee Lee in English and Reiko Takagi in Japanese.
Hakuei Ren	Magi: The Labyrinth of Magic	She is the first princess of the Kou Empire and the older sister of Prince Hakuryuu and Princess Kougyoku. Voiced by Nana Mizuki (Japanese) and Johanna Luis (English).
Serendine Dikumenowlz Du Parthevia	Magi: The Labyrinth of Magic	She is the first princess of the Parthevia Empire and the commander of the army, known as the "Venomous Spider Princess of Parthevia". Voiced by Ai Kayano (Japanese) and Abby Trott (English).
Princess Emeraude	Magic Knight Rayearth	She is the current pillar and the princess of Cephiro; elder sister of Prince Ferio. There is also a video game based on the anime.
Minky Momo	Mahou Princess Minky Momo	The princess of Fenarinarsa. Voiced by Koyama Mami, Rebecca Forstadt, Megumi Hayashibara.
Ruri Hoshino	Martian Successor Nadesico	Voiced by Omi Minami in Japanese and Kira Vincent-Davis in English.
Princess Maya	Maya and the Three	Maya, voiced by Zoe Saldaña, is the warrior princess of Mesoamerica who embarks on a quest to recruit three legendary warriors to help save humanity from destruction of the underworld gods. She is the daughter of the King and Queen Teca.
Caren	Mermaid Melody Pichi Pichi Pitch	Mermaid Princess of the Antarctic Ocean. Voiced by Ema Kogure.
Coco	Mermaid Melody Pichi Pichi Pitch	Mermaid Princess of the South Pacific Ocean. Voiced by Satomi Arai.
Hanon Hosho	Mermaid Melody Pichi Pichi Pitch	Mermaid Princess of the South Atlantic Ocean. Voiced by Hitomi Terakado.
Lucia Nanami	Mermaid Melody Pichi Pichi Pitch	Mermaid Princess of the North Pacific Ocean and the main protagonist of the series. Voiced by Asumi Nakada.
Noel	Mermaid Melody Pichi Pichi Pitch	Mermaid Princess of the Arctic Ocean. Voiced by Ryoko Nagata.
Rina Toin	Mermaid Melody Pichi Pichi Pitch	Mermaid Princess of the North Atlantic Ocean. Voiced by Mayumi Asano.
Sara	Mermaid Melody Pichi Pichi Pitch	She was the villainous mermaid princess of the Indian Ocean. Voiced by Kana Ueda.
Seira	Mermaid Melody Pichi Pichi Pitch	The future mermaid princess of the Indian Ocean and the young successor of Sara. Voiced by Eri Kitamura.
Evie Alfred	Mike the Knight	She is the young princess who is a witch-in-training. She is the younger sister of Prince Mike and the daughter of King Norg and Queen Martha. Voiced by Erin Pitt in North America and Jessica Hann in the United Kingdom.
Princess Shivani	Mira, Royal Detective	She is the crown princess of the Indian kingdom of Naiyapuram. Voiced by Shavanie Jayna.
Marina Ismail	Mobile Suit Gundam 00	The reigning princess of Azadistan. Voiced by Paula Lindberg (English) and Ayumi Tsunematsu (Japanese).
Cagalli Yula Athha	Mobile Suit Gundam SEED	Voiced by Naomi Shindo.
Relena Peacecraft	Mobile Suit Gundam Wing	Voiced by Lisa Ann Beley (English) and Akiko Yajima (Japanese).
Princess Scowlette	MoonDreamers	She is the villainous princess of Monstrous Middle who often tries to destroy the celestial Moondreamers to impress her mother, Queen Scowlene.
Princess Cat	My Knight and Me	The acrobatic tomboy princess who likes to tag along with Jimmy of Orange and his father Henri on their adventures. Voiced by Kaycie Chase.
Princess Vega	My Life as a Teenage Robot	She is formerly the good-hearted princess of the Cluster and the daughter of the evil Queen Vexus. She later becomes the Cluster's new queen. Voiced by Thora Birch.
Princess Ponies	My Little Pony	Princess Primrose, pink Earth pony princess. Voiced by Katie Leigh.; Princess Royal Blue, blue Earth pony princess. Voiced by Sherry Lynn.; Princess Serena, Earth pony princess. Voiced by Jennifer Darling.; Princess Sparkle, unicorn princess. Voiced by Alice Playten.; Princess Starburst, yellow Earth pony princess. Voiced by Kath Soucie.; Princess Tiffany, Pegasus princess and the leader of the Princess Ponies. Also voiced by Kath Soucie.; They appeared in the four-part episode "The Quest of the Princess Ponies".
Princess Cadance	My Little Pony: Friendship Is Magic	Princess Mi Amore Cadenza. She is the Princess of Love and rules the Crystal Empire jointly with her husband, Shining Armor. She is the mother of Flurry Heart, sister-in-law of Twilight Sparkle, and adopted niece of Princess Celestia. She was originally a pegasus. Voiced by Britt McKillip.
Princess Celestia	My Little Pony: Friendship Is Magic	She is the Princess of the Day and the older sister of Princess Luna. She raises the Sun every morning in the land of Equestria. Voiced by Nicole Oliver.
Princess Flurry Heart	My Little Pony: Friendship Is Magic	The daughter of Princess Cadance and Shining Armor, and the niece of Twilight Sparkle. She is the first known pony to have been born an alicorn. Voiced by Tabitha St. Germain.
Princess Luna	My Little Pony: Friendship Is Magic	She is the Princess of the Night and the younger sister of Princess Celestia. She raises the Moon every evening in the land of Equestria. Speaking voice by Tabitha St. Germain, singing voice by Kazumi Evans ("Twilight's Kingdom") and Aloma Steele ("A Hearth's Warming Tail").
Princess Twilight Sparkle	My Little Pony: Friendship Is Magic	She is the Princess of Friendship. Originally a unicorn, Twilight Sparkle was transformed into an alicorn after completing an unfinished spell created by Star Swirl the Bearded. Voiced by Tara Strong (speaking) and Rebecca Shoichet (singing).
Princess Arkana Goodfey	Mysticons	The elder princess of Gemina, leader of the Mysticons and the second Mysticon Dragon Mage. The first daughter of King and Queen Goodfey and the stepdaughter of King Darius. Voiced by Alyson Court.
Zarya Moonwolf	Mysticons	The younger twin sister of Arkana Goodfey and the second princess of Gemina who has been chosen as the second Mysticon Ranger; the biological daughter of King and Queen Goodfey and stepdaughter of King Darius. She is adopted by a family of Moonwolf. Voiced by Nicki Burke.
Nadia La Arwall	Nadia: The Secret of Blue Water	She is the princess and rightful heir of Atlantis who possesses the Blue Water; the biological daughter of former King Eleusis "Nemo" La Arwall and the sister of Emperor Benusis "Neo" La Arwall.
Hinata Hyuga	Naruto	The first daughter and heiress of the Hyuga Clan, known as the "Byakugan Princess".
Asuna Vesperina Theotanasia Entheofushia	Negima! Magister Negi Magi	Also known as the Imperial Princess of Twilight, she is a princess from the fallen empire of Vespertatia and student number eight in Mahora Girls' Jr. High Class. Voiced by Akemi Kanda in Japanese and Luci Christian in English.
Princess Nella	Nella the Princess Knight	The first daughter of King Dad and Queen Mom and the eponymous protagonist of the series. Voiced by Akira Golz.
Princess Norma	Nella the Princess Knight	The baby sister of Princess Nella and the second daughter of King Dad and Queen Mom. Voiced by Courtney Shaw.
Princess Tina	The New Adventures of Huckleberry Finn	She is the princess of Lilliput who has been engaged to Huck Finn but is already in relationship with Lord Bitto; the daughter of King Bigun in the episode "The Little People". Voiced by Julie Bennett.
Romina Ladorio	Ninja Senshi Tobikage	The princess and heir of the planet Ladorio. Voiced by Sumi Shimamoto.
Princess Harumi	Ninjago: Masters of Spinjitzu	Voiced by Britt McKillip.
Princess Vania	Ninjago: Masters of Spinjitzu	Voiced by Sabrina Pitre.
Stephanie Dola	No Game No Life	The teenage granddaughter of the previous King of Elkia. Voiced by Sara Ornelas in English and Yōko Hikasa in Japanese.
Boa Hancock	One Piece	She is known to her subjects as the "Snake Princess".
Mansherry	One Piece	The dwarven princess of the Tontatta Kingdom who has the ability to instantly heal any living being's injury with her tears. She is the daughter of the "Tonta-Chief", King Gancho.
Nefeltari Vivi	One Piece	Princess of the Alabasta Kingdom. She is also known as "Princess Vivi" in the English version.
Shirahoshi	One Piece	The gigantic Mermaid Princess of the Ryugu Kingdom and the youngest child of King Neptune and the late Queen Otohime.
Vinsmoke Reiju	One Piece	Better known as the "Poison Pink", Reiju is the princess of the Germa Kingdom, the sister of the former prince Vinsmoke Sanji and the daughter of King Judge and Queen Sora.
Viola/Violet	One Piece	Crown princess of Dressrosa whose older sister, Princess Scarlett, was killed when the Don Quixote Pirates took over her kingdom. She is the younger daughter of King Doldo III.
Aliceliese "Alice" Lou Nebulis IX	Our Last Crusade or the Rise of a New World	She is the second princess of the Nebulis Sovereignty whose magic power is to manipulate ice on a large scale. She is known as the "Ice Calamity Witch" by the Heavenly Empire and one of three daughters of Queen Millavair Lou Nebulis VIII. Voiced by Sora Amamiya in Japanese and Emily Neves in English.
Elletear Lou Nebulis IX	Our Last Crusade or the Rise of a New World	She is the eldest daughter of Queen Millavair Lou Nebulis VIII and the first princess of the Nebulis Sovereignty who conspired with the Heavenly Empire to betray her entire family and country after being mocked and mistreated by her mother and other people due to her weak astral powers. Voiced by Miyuki Sawashiro in Japanese and Anairis Quiñones in English.
Sisbell Lou Nebulis IX	Our Last Crusade or the Rise of a New World	She is Alice and Elletear's younger sister and the third princess of the Nebulis Sovereignty whose ability, "Illumination", allows her to see what happened in the past. In a year before the story's event, she was held captive in the Heavenly Empire until the main protagonist, Iska, rescued her. Voiced by Azumi Waki in Japanese and Emi Lo in English.
Renner Vaiself	Overlord	Renner Theiere Chardelon Ryle Vaiself, she is the third princess of the Re-Estize Kingdom, the daughter of King Ramposa III and the half-sister of Princes Barbro and Zanac Vaiself. Voiced by Jessica Peterson in English and Kiyono Yasuno in Japanese.
Princess Ana Medaiyu	Overman King Gainer	The daughter of Duke Medaiyu of Domepolis. Voiced by Noriko Kito in Japanese and Michelle Ruff in English.
Princess of Barkingburg	PAW Patrol	Voiced by Caoimhe Judd.
Princess Paw Paw	Paw Paws	Voiced by Susan Blu.
Princess Alrgelbaccch Blunkenthorttthhhph	Penn Zero: Part-Time Hero	The Princess of Alien World. Voiced by Elizabeth Henstridge.
Platinum Princess Candidates	Petite Princess Yucie	The five princesses who attend the Princess Academy and form their friendship: Yucie, princess of the Human World who is raised by the knight Gunbard and cursed in the body of a 10-year-old child.; Cocoloo, princess of the Spirit World who is gentle and soft-spoken and a friend to Yucie.; Glenda, princess of the Demon World (Underworld) who formerly rivals with Yucie.; Elmina, princess of Heaven (Celestrial Realm) who is very studious and fastidious and has a similar curse to Yucie.; Beth, princess of the Fairy World who is athletic and stubborn and also has a similar curse to Yucie.
Princess Baldegunde	Phineas and Ferb	The 15-year-old princess of Druelselstein who is the doppelgänger of Candace Flynn. Both Candace and Baldegunde are voiced by Ashley Tisdale.
Princess OomLout "Oom"	Planet Sheen	She is the daughter of the alien emperor of the planet Zeenu. OomLout has two different faces in which to switch, and was voiced by Candi Milo.
Princess Allie	Pokémon	Princess Allie of the Parfum Palace. She appeared in the episode "Awakening the Sleeping Giant!" and was voiced by Kate Bristol in English and Misato Fukuen in Japanese.
Princess Salvia	Pokémon	She is the doppelgänger of Dawn, appeared in the episode "Dawn of a Royal Day!" and was voiced by Erica Schroeder in English and Yumi Kakazu in Japanese.
Princess Sara	Pokémon	She appeared in the episode "The Princess and the Togepi" and was voiced by Tara Sands in English and Megumi Toyoguchi in Japanese.
Princess Melody	Potatoes and Dragons	The blonde-haired princess of the land of potatoes, and the daughter of King Hugo III, who befriends the dragon. Voiced by Carrie Finlay.
Princess Morbucks	The Powerpuff Girls (1998)	Voiced by Jennifer Hale in the 1998 version and Haley Mancini in the 2016 version.
Princess Bluebelle	The Powerpuff Girls (2016)	Bluebelle, voiced by Laura Bailey, is a parody of the Disney Princesses who resides in the fairy tale world but ends up visiting a modern-day city, similar to Giselle from Enchanted, in the episode "Once Upon a Townsville".
Yūki Soleil	The Price of Smiles	She is the 12-year-old energetic princess of the Kingdom of Soleil who thinks it is the duty of her father the King to make everyone and herself smile. Voiced by Yumiri Hanamori.
Princess Gwenevere	Princess Gwenevere and the Jewel Riders	Voiced by Kerry Butler (season 1) and Jean Louisa Kelly (season 2).
Charlotte Hazelrink	Princess Lover!	Princess of the fictional Hazelrink Principality. Voiced by Ryōka Yuzuki.
Natasha	Princess Natasha	She is secretly a princess and spy from Zoravia, and the daughter of King Carl and Queen Lena, who travels to the United States in order to stop the attacks of her villainous uncle Lubek.
Princess Charlotte	Princess Principal	Fourth Princess of a fictional analogue of England called Albion. She is voiced by Akira Sekine in Japanese and Patricia Duran in English.
Lillianne von Phoenix	Princess Resurrection	Also known as Hime, she is the princess from the Phoenix Tribe.
Sarah Crewe	Princess Sarah	The anime adaption of A Little Princess. Voiced by Sumi Shimamoto.
Princess Sissi	Princess Sissi	She is the titular character of the show. Voiced by Terri Hawkes.
Ahiru Arima/Princess Tutu	Princess Tutu	Voiced by Nanae Katō (Japanese) and Luci Christian (English).
Rue Kuroha/Princess Kraehe	Princess Tutu	Voiced by Nana Mizuki (Japanese) and Jessica Boone (English).
Septième Rodelia	Pumpkin Scissors	The seventh princess from the kingdom of Rodelia who Warrant Officer Martis has a subtle encounter with. She appeared in the episode "Rough Yet Delicious" and was voiced by Chiwa Saitō in Japanese and Sarah Swifford in English.
Menace	Queen's Blade	She was a princess from an ancient kingdom of Amara who died trapped in her palace but was resurrected by the villainous Swamp Witch. Voiced by Yūko Gotō in Japanese and Jessica Paquet in English.
Ymir	Queen's Blade	Iron Princess Ymir, she is the daughter of the Dwarven King. Voiced by Ayaka Saito in Japanese and Kate Vincent in English.
Princess Fianna	Record of Lodoss War	In the OVA series, Fianna is the only daughter of one of the "Six Heroes", King Fahn of Valis, who gains her responsibility and political role before becoming the new queen of Valis. Voiced by Rei Sakuma in Japanese and Simone Grant in English.
Flare Arlgrande Jioral	Redo of Healer	Also known as Freia, she is the first princess of the Jioral Kingdom who is known as the Magic Hero. Voiced by Ayano Shibuya.
Norn Clatalissa Jioral	Redo of Healer	Also known as Ellen, she is the second princess of the Jioral Kingdom and Flare's younger sister. Voiced by Minami Tsuda.
Princess Adelheid/Chocolate Parfait	Restaurant to Another World	She is the princess of the Great Empire, the granddaughter of Emperor Wilhelm, and the youngest great power on the Eastern Continent. Voiced by Reina Ueda in Japanese and by Jeannie Tirado (Season 1) and Alexis Tipton (Season 2) in English.
Anthy Himemiya	Revolutionary Girl Utena	Anthy is the mysterious princess who attends Ohtori Academy, with her older brother Akio Ohtori (formerly Prince Dios) as its chairman, where she is the Rose Bride for whom Utena Tenjou, a tomboy who poses as the "noble prince", escorts her throughout the sword dueling events. There is also an anime film adaptation, Adolescence of Utena.
Malty S. Melromarc/Myne Sophia	The Rising of the Shield Hero	The former first princess of Melromarc and primary antagonist of the series. Voiced by Faye Mata in English and Sarah Emi Bridcutt in Japanese.
Melty Q. Melromarc	The Rising of the Shield Hero	The second princess and heir of Melromarc and younger sister of Malty. Voiced by Jackie Lastra in English and Maaya Uchida in Japanese.
Marie Antoinette	The Rose of Versailles	Marie is a princess who later becomes the queen of France as a wife to the Dauphin. She is formerly the love interest of Oscar François de Jarjayes (a woman raised as a man) and Axel von Fersen the Younger. She is based on the real-life Marie Antoinette and was voiced by Miyuki Ueda.
Princess Kakyuu	Sailor Moon	Also known as Princess Fireball in English version, she is the princess of the planet Kinmoku outside the solar system.
Starfire	Teen Titans	
Princess Serenity ("Sailor Moon")	Sailor Moon; Sailor Moon Crystal	She is the princess of the Moon Kingdom and the daughter of Queen Serenity in her past life. In the future, she is Neo-Queen Serenity of Crystal Tokyo as the wife of King Endymion and mother of Chibiusa.
Princess Usagi "Small Lady" Serenity ("Sailor Chibi Moon")	Sailor Moon; Sailor Moon Crystal	She is the young princess of Crystal Tokyo and the daughter of Neo-Queen Serenity and King Endymion. She travels to the past to seek help from Sailor Moon and the Sailor Soldiers and later returns as a Soldier herself.
Saori Kido Athena	Saint Seiya	Voiced by Keiko Han, Fumiko Orikasa, Ayan Hirano and Allison Sumrall.
Sally Yumeno	Sally the Witch	She is the witch princess of the Magic Kingdom and the eponymous protagonist of the series.
Princess Violet "Vi" (Tokugawa Usako)	Samurai Pizza Cats	She is the rabbit princess of Little Tokyo and the mean, selfish daughter of Emperor Fred (panda) and Empress Frieda (rabbit). Voiced by Liza MacRae in English and Maria Kawamura in Japanese.
Aliyah-Din	Scooby-Doo! in Arabian Nights	The girl who wishes to become a princess in the gender-bent version of "Aladdin". Voiced by Jennifer Hale.
Pacifica Casull	Scrapped Princess	Also referred to as the "Scrapped Princess", Pacifica is the abandoned princess from the kingdom of Leinwan who was adopted by the Casull family. Voiced by Fumiko Orikasa in Japanese and Kari Wahlgren in English.
Princess Seness Giat	Scrapped Princess	The warrior princess of the Giat Empire. Voiced by Yuki Matsuoka in Japanese and Wendee Lee in English.
Princess Ping	The Secret Show	The sister of Prince Spong of the planet Zabulon.
Elaine	The Seven Deadly Sins	A princess of the Fairy Clan, and sister of King. Voiced by Kotori Koiwai (Japanese) and Brianna Knickerbocker (English).
Elizabeth Liones	The Seven Deadly Sins	The third princess of Liones as the adopted daughter of King Bartra. She is the main viewpoint character of the story as well as the main female protagonist. Voiced by Sora Amamiya (Japanese) and Erika Harlacher (English).
Margaret Liones	The Seven Deadly Sins	The First Princess of Liones, daughter of King Bartra, sister of Veronica, and eldest adoptive sister of Elizabeth. Voiced by Nana Mizuki (Japanese) and Johanna Luis (English).
Nadja Liones	The Seven Deadly Sins	The sister of King Bartra and love interest of Gowther.
Veronica Liones	The Seven Deadly Sins	Second Princess of Liones, daughter of King Bartra, younger sister of Princess Margaret, and elder adoptive sister of Princess Elizabeth. Voiced by Hisako Kanemoto (Japanese) and Abby Trott (English).
Princess Adora ("She-Ra")	She-Ra: Princess of Power; He-Man and the Masters of the Universe	Daughter of King Randor and Queen Marlena; princess of Eternia and the twin sister of Prince Adam.
Princesses of Etheria	She-Ra and the Princesses of Power	Adora, the current incarnation of She-Ra, the Princess of Power. Voiced by Aimee Carrero.; Princess Entrapta, Princess of Dryll and a former member of the Princess Alliance. Unlike many of the other princesses, she has no magical powers and no runestone. Voiced by Christine Woods.; Princess Frosta, Princess of Castle Chill in the Kingdom of Snows. Voiced by Merit Leighton.; Princess Glimmer, Princess of Brightmoon and daughter of Queen Angella and King Micah. Voiced by Karen Fukuhara.; Princess Mermista, Princess of Salineas and daughter of King Mercier. Voiced by Vella Lovell.; Princess Perfuma, Princess of Plumeria. Voiced by Genesis Rodriguez.; Princess Scorpia, a member of the Evil Horde whose family gave their runestone, the Black Garnet, to Lord Hordak. Voiced by Lauren Ash.
Princess Adara	Shimmer and Shine	The stardust princess of Zahramay Skies. Voiced by Tania Gunadi.
Princess Samira	Shimmer and Shine	The princess of Zahramay Falls and one of the main characters of the show. Voiced by Nikki SooHoo in the US and Cariad Lloyd in the UK.
Princess Ula	Shimmer and Shine	The Gem Princess of Rainbow Zahramay who is in charge of giving all the Genies Gems their magic powers. Voiced by Tatyana Ali.
Princess Kemi of Nigeria	The Simpsons	The daughter of a Nigerian king who makes a deal with Mr. Burns. She appeared in the episode "The Princess Guide" and was voiced by Yaya DaCosta.
Yuriarna Merol Melissa Rhoden Olav	Skeleton Knight in Another World	The second princess of the Rhoden Kingdom, and the younger daughter of King Karlon, who has been assassinated on her way to the Grand Duchy of Limbult but is resurrected by Arc's Rejuvenation magic. She is the younger sister of Duchess Seriarna of Limbult and the half-sister of Princes Sekt and Dakares. Voiced by Saori Ōnishi in Japanese and Danielle Yoshiko Phillips in English.
Amelia Wil Tesla Seyruun	Slayers	She is the Princess of Seyruun and the youngest daughter of Prince Philionel.
Gracia Ul Naga Seyruun	Slayers	Better known as "Naga the White Serpent", she is the older sister of Amelia and the oldest daughter of Prince Philionel.
Martina Zoana Mel Navratilova	Slayers	She is the former Princess, and later Queen, of the Kingdom of Zoana. She is named after professional tennis player Martina Navratilova.
Princess Syalis	Sleepy Princess in the Demon Castle	Princess Aurora Sya Lis Goodereste, otherwise known simply as Syalis. She is the princess from the kingdom of Goodereste in the human world who has been taken by the Demon King Tasogare but finds a good place to sleep in his castle. Voiced by Inori Minase in Japanese and Kira Buckland in English.
Princess Savina	The Smurfs	Voiced by Jennifer Darling.
Suelecia "Sue" Analeit	So I'm a Spider, So What?	She is the second princess of the Analeit Kingdom who cares deeply for her older half-brother Prince Shun but willingly aids Shiraori out of fear to frame him while assassinating her father King Meiges under the coup of her elder brother Crown Prince Cylis. Voiced by Yui Ogura in Japanese and Kira Buckland in English.
Princesses from Sofia the First	Sofia the First	Princess Sofia ("Sofia the First"); the daughter of Miranda, who marries King Roland II of Enchancia. Released as a TV movie in Fall 2012, and a TV series in Spring 2013. Voiced by Ariel Winter.: Princess Amber, Sofia's elder stepsister, the Princess of Enchancia; Voiced by Darcy Rose Byrnes.; Princess Arsinoe, voiced by Sarah Mitchell.; Princess Charlotte of Isleworth; daughter of King Philip and Queen Everly. Charlotte is a former wearer of the Amulet of Avalor whom Sophia helps to break a curse; voiced by Megan Hilty.; Princess Clio of Corinthia; a friend of Princesses Amber, Hildegard, and Sofia; voiced by Harley Graham.; Princess Hildegard of Friezenburg; friend of Sofia's stepsister, Amber. Hildegard has an older sister. Voiced by Coco Grayson.; Princess Jun of Wei-Ling, daughter of Emperor Quon and Empress Lin-Lin, sister of Prince Jin. Voiced by Michaela Zee.; Princess Leena of Khaldoun, daughter of King Nasir and Queen Anya, sister of Princess Maya and Prince Khalid. Voiced by Sarah Mitchell.; Princess Mae of Athens, voiced by Alyson Stoner.; Princess Matilda; Princess Maya of Khaldoun, daughter of King Nasir and Queen Anya, sister of Princess Leena and Prince Khalid. Voiced by Olivia Grace.; Princess Penelope "Penny" of York, voiced by Bailee Madison.; Princess Vivian of Zumaria, daughter of Queen Cecily; Sofia's shy, musically gifted best friend; she is one of Sofia's classmates at Royal Prep. Voiced by Sabrina Carpenter.; Princess Cora of Mermaid Cove, daughter of Queen Emmaline and Oona's mermaid older sister who aids Sofia in Oona's rescue. Voiced by Sarah Mitchell.; Princess Oona of Mermaid Cove, daughter of Queen Emmaline; Sofia's mermaid friend who is kidnapped but is saved by Sofia and her sister Cora. Voiced by Kiernan "Kiki" Shipka.; Princess Lei-Lani "Lani" of Hakalo, voiced by Abigail Mavity.; Princess Zooey; daughter of Queen Avery (Kath Soucie). Voiced by Fiona Bishop.; Princess Ivy, an evil princess who attempted to take over Sofia's kingdom after Amber stole Sofia's amulet which put a curse on her by summoning Princess Ivy. Voiced by Anna Camp.; Duchess Matilda ("Aunt Tilly"). Voiced by Bonnie Hunt.
Princess Sparkle	Spider Riders	The princess of Arachna and the younger sister of Prince Lumen. Voiced by Melanie Tonello in English and Kaori Shimizu in Japanese.
Ophiuchus/Darknest	Star☆Twinkle PreCure	She is the leader of the Notraiders and the main villainess of the series who is a former member of the Star Princesses before being exiled by them, leading the Notraiders to attack the princesses' Star Palace and then seek the twelve Princess Star Color Pens.
Star Princesses	Star☆Twinkle PreCure	They are a group of thirteen princesses who are based on the Zodiac signs and protect the balance of the universe. They soon scatter themselves across the universe as the Princess Star Color Pens sought by the Pretty Cures and the Notraiders.: Princess Taurus; Princess Leo; Princess Libra; Princess Capricorn; Princess Scorpio; Princess Sagittarius; Princess Virgo; Princesses Gemini twins; Princess Aries; Princess Aquarius; Princess Cancer; Princess Pisces
Meteora Butterfly	Star vs. the Forces of Evil	Formerly known as Miss Heinous, she is the former princess and true heir to the throne of Mewni. Voiced by Kari Wahlgren as a baby, Bryana Salaz as a teenager and Jessica Walter as an adult.
Star Butterfly	Star vs. the Forces of Evil	Princess of Mewni and the main character of the series. Voiced by Eden Sher.
Princess Aurora	Starzinger	The princess of the Moon. Voiced by Kazuko Sugiyama.
Shūrei Hong	The Story of Saiunkoku	She is the daughter of the Hong clan. Voiced by Houko Kuwashima in Japanese and Kelly Sheridan in English.
Princess Alia	Strange Dawn	She was a princess who used her magic powers to summon the two human girls, Yuko and Eri, to her planet but later died during an escape attempt. Voiced by Yuri Shiratori.
Princess Berrykin	Strawberry Shortcake's Berry Bitty Adventures	Voiced by Andrea Libman.
La Folia Rihavein	Strike the Blood	The beautiful, silver-haired princess of Aldegyr. Voiced by Saori Ōnishi.
Ako Shirabe	Suite PreCure	The princess of Major Land, whose alter ego is Cure Muse.
Princess Pea (aka Princess Presto)	Super Why!	Voiced by Tajja Isen.
Princess Ilana	Sym-Bionic Titan	The alien princess. Voiced by Tara Strong.
Princess Grace	TaleSpin	She is a white swan who is a princess, and later queen, of the Walla-Walla-Bing-Bang kingdom in the episode "Waiders of the Wost Tweasure". Voiced by Victoria Carroll.
Princess Lotta L'Amour	TaleSpin	She is a vixen crown princess of the Middle-Eastern kingdom of Macadamia and the daughter of King Amuck (rabbit) in the episode "The Road to Macadamia". Voiced by Kath Soucie.
Princess Aja Tarron	Tales of Arcadia	Voiced by Tatiana Maslany.
Princess Claris	Tantei Opera Milky Holmes	The princess of Marlo who bears a striking resemblance to Sheryl Shellingford and yearns to be a normal girl, despite her arranged marriage to Prince Pero. Voiced by Ai Nonaka.
Princess Mallory of Malicuria	Teenage Mutant Ninja Turtles	Voiced by Renae Jacobs
Ayeka Masaki Jurai	Tenchi Muyo!	She is the First Princess of Jurai.
Sasami Masaki Jurai	Tenchi Muyo!	She is the Second Princess of Jurai and Ayeka's younger sister.
Princess Ariel	Thundarr the Barbarian	Voiced by Nellie Bellflower.
Princess Shalala	Time Travel Tondekeman	Voiced by Rei Sakuma.
Lala Satalin Deviluke	To Love Ru	The princess of the Deviluke kingdom, older daughter of King Gid Lucion and Queen Sephie Michaela Deviluke; older sister of the twin princesses Nana Asta and Momo Belia Deviluke.
Princess Erika	Tōshō Daimos	A part of the Robot Romance Trilogy, Erika, voiced by Miyuki Ueda, is a former princess of the Baam Empire who works as a field doctor after her father Emperor Leon was poisoned by the villainous Olban and his right-hand man Georiya. She is also the sister of the disgruntled Prince Richter and the love interest of Kazuya Ryūzaki.
Princess Grizelda	True and the Rainbow Kingdom	Grizelda, voiced by Anna Bartlam, is a self-centered princess who claims herself to be one for the Rainbow Kingdom but realizes she needs a friend like True. She is also accompanied with her dog Frookie.
Sakura	Tsubasa Chronicle the Movie: The Princess of the Country of Birdcages	Voiced by Yui Makino.
Princess Tomoyo	Tsubasa Chronicle the Movie: The Princess of the Country of Birdcages	Voiced by Maaya Sakamoto.
Shoukei	The Twelve Kingdoms	She was the sheltered princess of the Hou Kingdom and the daughter of the late King Chuutatsu and Queen Kaka. Voiced by Kate Higgins in English and Houko Kuwashima in Japanese.
Princesses from Twin Princess of Wonder Planet	Twin Princess of Wonder Planet	Fine and Rein, the twin princesses of the Sunny Kingdom.; Grace, the legendary princess from the ancient days.; Milky, the toddler princess of the Moon Kingdom.; Lione, the princess of the Flame Kingdom.; Mirlo, the princess of the Water Drop Kingdom.; Seed Princesses, the eleven princesses of the Seed Kingdom.; Altezza, the princess of the Jewelry Kingdom.; Sophie, the princess of the Windmill Kingdom.; Pearl, the princess of the Sea Kingdom.
Princesses from Twin Princess of Wonder Planet Gyu!	Twin Princess of Wonder Planet	Elizabetta, the princess of the Planet Celeb.; Chiffon, the princess of the Planet Mathematics.; March, the princess of the Planet Morals; Lemon, the princess of the Planet Naniwan.; Bibin, the princess of the Black Planet.
Maria Grace Fleed	UFO Robot Grendizer	She is a princess who, like her brother Crown Prince Duke Fleed, has been raised on Earth after her home planet Fleed was destroyed by the forces of King Vega.
Rubina	UFO Robot Grendizer	She was the daughter of King Vega and the princess of the planet Vega who was a fiancée to Duke Fleed, only to be separated by the attack of the Queen Spazer fortress.
Princess Valkyire "Val"	UFO Ultramaiden Valkyrie	Valkyrie is the princess from the planet Valhalla who flees to Earth and, after transferring part of her soul to her lover Kazuto Tokino, takes on the form of an 8-year-old child. She has seven sisters: Princess Mehm; Princess Hydra; Princess Chorus; Princess Pharm; Princess Inarba; Princess Nesty; Princess Laine
Charlotte de Valois	Ulysses: Jeanne d'Arc and the Alchemist Knight	She is a princess of the Kingdom of France, and the third daughter of the Royal Family of Valois, who becomes the heir to the throne after her brothers' deaths in the Battle of Azincourt. She is the female counterpart of Charles VII of France and is voiced by Saori Ōnishi in Japanese and Amber Lee Connors in English.
Kurama	Urusei Yatsura	The humanoid princess of the Karasutengu (crow goblin) alien race. Voiced by Rihoko Yoshida.
Lum	Urusei Yatsura	Voiced by Fumi Hirano.
Princess Camyu	Utawarerumono	The second princess of Onkamiyamukai who was born with black wings. Voiced by Rie Kugimiya in original Japanese and Serena Varghese in English dub.
Princess Ulthury	Utawarerumono	Camyu's older sister and the first princess of Onkamiyamukai who was born with white wings and holds the title of High Priestess. Voiced by Sayaka Ohara in Japanese and Kelly Manison in English.
Lieselotte W. Dorssia	Valvrave the Liberator	She is the princess of Dorssia who saved L-elf's life when they were children but later believes she does not belong with him as a result to being a Magius. Voiced by Aki Toyosaki.
Miyu	Vampire Princess Miyu	
Princess Tinyfeet	The Venture Bros.	Voiced by Suzanne Gilad.
Charlotte Abelfreyja Drossel	Violet Evergarden	Princess of the Kingdom of Drossel. Voiced by Stephanie Sheh in English and Megumi Nakajima in Japanese.
Millerna Aston	The Vision of Escaflowne	She is the third princess of the kingdom of Asturia, youngest daughter of the widowed King Grava Aston and younger sister of Princesses Marlene and Eries Aston.
Marlene Freid (née Aston)	The Vision of Escaflowne	She was the first princess of Asturia, oldest daughter of King Grava Aston and older sister of Millerna and Eries Aston. She adopted Chid Freid, the biological son of her former lover Allen Schezar, to make him the prince and heir of the duchy of Freid.
Princess Allura (Princess Fala)	Voltron	Voiced by B. J. Ward in the 1980s and 1990s series, Ashleigh Ball in the 2011 series, and Kimberly Brooks in the 2016 series.
Elyon Escanor/Elyon Brown	W.I.T.C.H.	She is the lost princess, and later rightful queen, of Meridian who was raised by the family of Brown as a normal girl from her evil brother Prince Phobos. Voiced by Serena Berman.
Princess Amalia Sheran Sharm	Wakfu	She is the Princess of the Sadida Kingdom.
The Ugly Princesses	Wakfu	A group of princesses that have been cursed to become ugly by the God Osamodes.: Princess Eenca; Princess Ydalipe; Princess Erpel; Princess Lela
Princess Demurra	Wander Over Yonder	Voiced by Jennifer Hale.
Princess Sara	Wildfire	The princess of Thurinia, the daughter of Prince Cavan and the late Queen Sarana, and the main character of the show. Voiced by Georgi Irene.
Members of the Winx Club	Winx Club	Aisha, the Princess of the surface of Andros and the fairy of waves.; Amentia, the Princess of Downland.; Bloom, the Princess of Domino who is a fairy with the power of 'the dragon flame'.; Daphne, the Nymph of Domino and Bloom's older sister.; Diaspro, a princess from Eraklyon and Prince Sky's former fiancée.; Galatea, the Princess of Melody.; Icy, the Princess of Dyamond.; Krystal, the Princess of Linphea.; Roxy, the Princess of Tir Na Nog and the fairy of animals.; Sapphire, the Princess of Dyamond and Icy's younger sister.; Stella, the Princess of Solaria and the fairy of the sun, the moon, and the stars.; Tressa, the mermaid princess of the oceans of Andros and the cousin of Aisha.
May von Earls-hide	Wise Man's Grandchild	She is the 10-year-old princess of the Earlshide Kingdom who turns out to be a prodigy after learning under Merlin Wolford and his ex-wife Melida Bowen. She is the younger sister of Prince August and the daughter of King Diseum and Queen Julia. Voiced by Maya Hinanogi in Japanese and Brittany Lauda in English.
Lemercier Princesses	The World Is Still Beautiful	The four princesses of the Rain Dukedom.: Mira Lemercier, the first princess; Nia Lemercier, the second princess; Kara Lemercier, the third princess; Nike Lemercier, the fourth princess and the main protagonist
Princess Crepe	Yes! PreCure 5 GoGo!	The tiger princess who rules the Crêpe Kingdom and is one of the Four Rulers in which she holds the Rose Garden Key to open the door to the Cure Rose Garden.
Yona	Yona of the Dawn	She is the sole princess of the Kouka Kingdom, daughter of the pacifistic King II and the late Queen Kashi. Voiced by Chiwa Saitō in Japanese and Monica Rial in English.
Princess Adena	Yu-Gi-Oh! Duel Monsters	The princess of Sin Lau who is created in the virtual reality game by Seto Kaiba based on his younger brother Mokuba. Voiced by Eri Sendai in Japanese and Tara Sands in English.
Princess Rose	Yu-Gi-Oh! GX	Voiced by Hiroko Kasahara in Japanese and Veronica Taylor in English.
Princess Silver	Yume no Crayon Oukoku	She is a young princess of the Crayon Kingdom, and the descendant of Queen Buretsu, who has "Twelve bad habits".

== Radio ==
Princess	Series title	Notes
Princess Theresa of Liechtenstein	Cabin Pressure	Eldest sister of the King of Liechtenstein (a title which does not exist in real life), and love interest of pilot Martin Crieff.
Erimemushinteperem	Doctor Who	More commonly known as "Erimem", she is the fictional daughter of Pharaoh Amenhotep II and a companion of the Fifth Doctor. She appears in a number of audio plays produced by Big Finish Productions, in which she is played by Caroline Morris.

== Video games ==
Princess	Game	System(s)	Note
Princess of Traumere	100 Sleeping Princes and the Kingdom of Dreams	Android; iOS	She is the long-lost princess in the Dream World who has to rescue various princes from the monstrous Dream Eaters and defend their world.
Rosa Cossette D'Elise	Ace Combat 7: Skies Unknown	PlayStation 4; Xbox One; Windows	The defensive princess and heir of the Kingdom of Erusea.
Licia de novus Yurii	Aiyoku no Eustia	Windows; Vita	She is a mischievous princess and successor to the throne with little interest in the politics of the city of Novus Aither. Voiced by Yuzuha Ebihara in Windows and Eriko Nakamura in PS Vita.
Princess Lora	Alex Kidd in Miracle World	Master System	Also known as Princess Rooney, she is the fiancée of Prince Igul of Radaxian and the future sister-in-law of Alex Kidd.
Princess Sarah	Amazing Princess Sarah	Xbox 360; Windows; WP; Xbox One	She is the princess of Kaleiya who is on a quest to rescue her father the King from the evil Demon Queen Lilith.
Isabella Ximénez	ARMA: Queen's Gambit	Windows	Formerly the princess of Sahrani, she becomes the kingdom's reigning queen as she assumes power as a sole remaining member of her royal family. She is the daughter of the late King Joseph and younger sister of Crown Prince Orlando.
Princess Arzette	Arzette: The Jewel of Faramore	Switch; PS4; PS5; Windows; Xbox Series X/S	She is a feisty princess of the Kingdom of Faramore who is on the mission to defeat the demon lord Daimur.
Princess Rosebud	The Astyanax	NES	The ruler of the Remila kingdom.
Aisya	ASH: Archaic Sealed Heat	Nintendo DS	The warrior princess and future queen of the Kingdom of Millinear.
Maritie	ASH: Archaic Sealed Heat	Nintendo DS	The princess of the Kingdom of Aceshin.
Princess Athena	Athena	Arcade; NES; Amstrad CPC; C64; ZX Spectrum; PSN	The headstrong princess from the Kingdom of Victory and the main protagonist of the game. She is named after the Greek goddess Athena.
Yoyo	Bahamut Lagoon	SNES	Princess of Kahna and dragon whisperer; struggles with the conflict between her responsibility to her fallen nation, and her growing feelings for the enemy general, Palpaleos. The true protagonist, as the plot concerns her doubts and development.
Princess Angelica	Battletoads	NES/Famicom; Genesis; Game Boy; Game Gear; Amiga; CD32	The daughter of the Terren Emperor and the princess of the Terren Corporate who the Battletoads rescue from the evil Dark Queen.
Princess Millian	Bomberman Hero	Nintendo 64	Princess of the planet Primus Star.
Gloria	Bravely Default 2	Nintendo Switch	She is the refugee princess from the lost kingdom of Musa and one of the main characters of the game.
Princess Nina	Breath of Fire	SNES; Game Boy Advance	She is a winged princess whose people of Wyndia can transform into large birds. There are also distant relatives who share the same name with Nina in Breath of Fire II, III and IV.
Princess Elina	Breath of Fire IV	PlayStation; Windows	She is the princess of Wyndia and older sister of Nina, who has been engaged to Prince Morley of Ludia but is aware of romantic feelings of Cray, chief of the cat-like tribe of Woren.
Princess Margarita	The Castle; Castlequest	PC-8801; PC-9801; PC-6001; FM-7; PC-88; X1; MSX; SG-1000; NES	
Princess of Moss	Castlevania: Bloodlines	Genesis	
Princess Pitts	Chibi-Robo! Plug Into Adventure!	GameCube; Wii	She is a princess doll in Jenny Sanderson's bedroom.
Princess Aurora	Child of Light	Windows; PS3; PS4; Vita; Wii U; Xbox 360; Xbox One; Switch	The daughter of the Duke of five hills.
Marle	Chrono Trigger	SNES; PlayStation; Nintendo DS	Although her real name is Nadia, princess of the Kingdom of Guardia and daughter of King Guardia XXXIII and Queen Aliza, she leaves home under the name "Marle" to travel through time with Crono and Lucca.
Schala	Chrono Trigger	SNES; PlayStation; Nintendo DS	She is the princess of Zeal and the older sister of Prince Janus.
Solange Blanchefleur De Lux	Code of Princess	3DS; Windows	Exiled princess of the DeLuxia Kingdom who is armed with the Sacred Blade DeLuxcalibur sword and sets out to find the cause of the violent behavior of monsters that have attacked her kingdom.
Crystal Princess	Conquest of the Crystal Palace	NES	
Princess Cookie	Cookie Run: Kingdom	iOS; Android	She is the gingerbread princess of the Hollyberry Kingdom, the daughter of Royal Berry Cookie (king) and Jungleberry Cookie (queen), and the granddaughter of Hollyberry Cookie.
Tiger Lily Cookie	Cookie Run: Kingdom	iOS; Android	She was born to be a princess of the Hollyberry Kingdom, like her sister Princess Cookie, but has been estranged from her royal family and ends up living in the jungle as a gingerbread jungle warrior.
Princess Alexandra	Cute Knight	Windows; Linux; Macintosh	A runaway princess who bears a striking resemblance to Michiko.
Michiko	Cute Knight	Windows; Linux; Macintosh	An orphaned knight who discovers that her biological mother is actually Queen Penelope.
Princess Devilotte de Deathsatan IX	Cyberbots: Full Metal Madness	Arcade; Saturn; PlayStation	She is the daughter of the dangerous and reputed pirate king.
Ani Inako	Dame×Prince	Android; iOS	She is the princess of Inaco and the main protagonist of the game. Voiced by Sayuri Yahagi.
Sonia Nevermind	Danganronpa 2: Goodbye Despair	PSP; Vita; Windows; OS X; Linux; PlayStation 4	Princess of a small European country called Novoselic. Member of the 77-B class and known as the Ultimate Princess (or Super High School Level Princess), Sonia Nevermind was one of the participants of the Killing School Trip.
Princess Monica Raybrandt	Dark Chronicle	PlayStation 2	
Morrigan Aensland	Darkstalkers	Arcade; Various	
Kasumi	Dead or Alive	Arcade; Saturn; PlayStation; Dreamcast; PlayStation 2; Xbox; Xbox 360; PlayStation Portable; Nintendo 3DS; PlayStation 3; iOS; PlayStation Vita; Xbox One; PlayStation 4; Windows	
Fiona	Dead or Alive Xtreme Venus Vacation	Stream; DMM	A big-breasted, Wisteria-haired princess from an unidentified European country who arrived at the Venus Islands (the setting of the game), officially to learn how to become a bride, but mostly due to falling in love with the player character at first sight.
Nyotengu	Dead or Alive 5 series	Arcade; PlayStation 3; PlayStation Vita; PlayStation 4; Xbox 360; Xbox One; Switch; Steam; DMM	Although not directly stated in her bio, her summary in Xtreme Venus Vacation claims that she acted as the princess of the various Tengu.
Hezeliah Shaytham	The Diofield Chronicle	Windows; Switch; PS4; PS5; Xbox One; Xbox Series X/S	Hezeliah is a princess whose Kingdom of Alletain sits in the close vicinity of a conflict between the Trovelt-Schoevian Empire and the Rowetale Alliance. She is the sister of Prince Levantia Shaytham.
Sapphire Rhodonite	Disgaea 3: Absence of Justice	PlayStation 3	Princess of the Human World.
Emily Kaldwin	Dishonored series	Windows; PlayStation 3; Xbox 360; PlayStation 4; Xbox One	Voiced by Erica Luttrell as an adult and Chloë Grace Moretz as a child.
Princess of Gentlehaven	Disney Princess: Enchanted Journey	PS2; Wii; Windows; PSN	She is an amnesiac girl who discovers that she is actually a princess and travels through worlds inhabited by the Disney Princesses. Voiced by Isabelle Fuhrman.
Princess Zara	Disney Princess: Enchanted Journey	PS2; Wii; Windows; PSN	She is an evil ex-princess who uses her magic powers in attempt to stop every girl from becoming a new princess. Voiced by Melissa Disney.
Princess Penny	Dokapon Kingdom	PlayStation 2; Wii	
Princess Celia	Dragon Buster	Arcade; Famicom; MSX; PC-8801; PC-9801; X68000; Mobile phone	The daughter of King Lawrence.
Princess Gwaelin of Alefgard	Dragon Quest	NES/Famicom	Also known as Lady Lora, daughter of King Lorik XVI of Alefgard.
Princess of Moonbrooke	Dragon Quest II: Luminaries of the Legendary Line	NES/Famicom	She is the cousin of two main characters, the Prince of Midenhall and the Prince of Cannock.
Tsarevna Alena of Zamoksva	Dragon Quest IV: Chapters of the Chosen	NES; PlayStation; Nintendo DS; Android; iOS	
Princess Medea	Dragon Quest VIII: Journey of the Cursed King	PS2; Android; iOS; 3DS	Princess of Trodain, and daughter of the cursed King Trode, who is transformed into a horse.
Princess Anlucia	Dragon Quest X: Awakening of the Five Tribes Online	Wii; Wii U; Windows; Android; iOS; 3DS; PS4; Switch	Also known as Hero Princess Anlucia, she is the princess of Gran Zedora and the sister of villainous Prince Toma. Also of note is her mother Princess Yulia.
Princess Jade	Dragon Quest XI: Echoes of an Elusive Age	3DS; PS4; Windows; Switch; Xbox One	The exiled princess of Heliodor and a martial artist who fights with her fisticuffs, claws and spears. She is the daughter of King Carnelian.
Princess Tina (Mica)	Dragon Slayer: The Legend of Heroes	NEC PC-8801; NEC PC-9801; FM Towns; MSX 2; TurboGrafx-CD; Super Famicom; X68000; Mega Drive; Satellaview; Windows; PlayStation; Saturn	She is the princess of the Sordis Kingdom and the daughter of King Theos. She later becomes the queen of Farlalyne and the mother of Prince Atlas when she marries King Serios (Logan) in Dragon Slayer: The Legend of Heroes II.
Princess Alicia	Dragon Spirit	Arcade; Amiga; Amstrad CPC; Atari ST; C64; TurboGrafx-16; X68000; ZX Spectrum	She is the princess from the kingdom of Mitgult. She later becomes the queen of Olympis when she is married to King Armul (Amru in English).
Princess Iris	Dragon Spirit: The New Legend	NES	She is the princess of Olympis, daughter of King Armul and Queen Alicia and the sister of Prince Lace.
Princess Vivian	Dragon's Crown	PS3; Vita; PS4	The silent princess of Hydeland who is later made queen and inherits the titular Dragon's Crown following the defeat of the ancient dragon.
Aelinor	Dragon's Dogma	PS3; PS4; Xbox 360; Xbox One; Windows; Switch	She is a member of the House of Biquard, daughter of the Lord of Meloire, and the wife of Duke Edmun Dragonsbane of Gransys.
Princess What's-Her-Name	Earthworm Jim series	Various	A princess who Jim rescues from Queen Slug-for-a-Butt. In the animated series, Princess What's-Her-Name is established to be the princess of the Insectikans, an insect-like alien species, and the sister of Queen Slug-for-a-Butt.
Ranni the Witch	Elden Ring	PS4; PS5; Windows; Xbox One; Xbox Series X/S; Switch 2	Daughter of Queen Rennala, she is most notable for being the primary catalyst to the events of Elden Ring, and the instigator of one of the game's main quest lines, culminating in the hidden "Age of Stars" ending.
Princess Rilule	Étoile Princesse	X68000	She is a young, careless princess of Fail Land who takes on a journey to rescue Sol and the female magicians from a dark witch.
Princess Gutrune	Etrian Odyssey III: The Drowned City	Nintendo DS	The Deep Princess.
The Princess (The Heroine)	Fable III	Xbox 360; Windows	The player may choose to control either a female character (The Princess/The Heroine), voiced by Mischa Goodman, or a male character (The Prince/The Hero), voiced by Louis Tamone.
Fat Princess	Fat Princess; Fat Princess Adventures	PS3; Portable; PS4	She is a princess who the teammates feed slices of cake, causing her to gain weight and become heavier for the enemy to carry to their castle. Voiced by Tara Strong.
Princess Sarah	Final Fantasy; Stranger of Paradise: Final Fantasy Origin	NES; Windows; PS4; PS5; Xbox One; Xbox Series X/S	Princess of the Kingdom of Cornelia.
Princess Aire	Final Fantasy: The 4 Heroes of Light	Nintendo DS	Princess of Horne and younger sister of Princess Carino.
Princess Hilda	Final Fantasy II	Famicom; WonderSwan Color; PlayStation; GBA; PSP; iOS; Android	Princess of Fynn whose White Mage Minwu serves as her right-hand man.
Sara Altney	Final Fantasy III	Famicom; DS; iOS; Android; PSP; Ouya; Windows Phone; Windows	Princess of Sasune.
Princess Luca	Final Fantasy IV	SNES	The only child of the dwarven King Giott.
Ursula Fang Leiden	Final Fantasy IV: The After Years	Wii; PSP; iOS; Android; Windows	The princess of Fabul who wants to be a strong monk like her father King Yang Fang Leiden.
Garnet Til Alexandros XVII	Final Fantasy IX	PlayStation	Princess of Alexandria.
Faris Scherwiz	Final Fantasy V	Super Famicom; PlayStation; GBA; iOS; Android; Windows	She was born as Princess Sarisa Scherwil Tycoon, daughter of the late King Alexander Highwind Tycoon, but was raised as a boy by the pirates.
Krile Mayer Baldesion	Final Fantasy V	Super Famicom; PlayStation; GBA; iOS; Android; Windows	She is the granddaughter of old King Galuf Halm Baldesion and the princess of the Bal kingdom.
Lenna Charlotte Tycoon	Final Fantasy V	Super Famicom; PlayStation; GBA; iOS; Android; Windows	Also known as Reina, she is Faris's biological sister. Lenna later becomes the queen of the Kingdom of Tycoon after her father's death.
Yuffie Kisaragi	Final Fantasy VII	PS2	Female ninja princess and daughter of the Lord of Wutai.
Princess Ashe	Final Fantasy XII	PS2	Princess Ashelia of Dalmasca.
Lunafreya Nox Fleuret	Final Fantasy XV	PS4; Xbox One; Windows	Also known simply as Luna, she is the oracle who is formerly the princess of Tenebrae, daughter of Queen Sylva Via Fleuret, and younger sister of the former Prince Ravus Nox Fleuret. She is also betrothed to Crown Prince Noctis Lucis Caelum.
Fiona	Final Fantasy Crystal Chronicles	GameCube	Princess of Alfitaria who is half Lilty and half Clavat.
Althea Sol Alfitaria	Final Fantasy Crystal Chronicles: The Crystal Bearers	Wii	The new princess of Alfitaria.
Sarah	Final Fantasy Dimensions	FOMA 903i; iOS; Android	The princess from the Kingdom of Burtgang and a member of the Warriors of Light.
Ovelia Atkascha	Final Fantasy Tactics	PlayStation	Princess of Ordalia.
Lucina	Fire Emblem Awakening	Nintendo 3DS	Crown Princess of Ylisse, daughter of Chrom, and a major character of the game. She traveled back about 18 years to prevent an apocalyptic future.
Lissa	Fire Emblem Awakening	Nintendo 3DS	Princess of Ylisse, younger sister of Chrom and Queen Emmeryn, future aunt of Lucina, and a major character of the game.
Say'ri	Fire Emblem Awakening	Nintendo 3DS	Princess of Chon'sin and younger sister of King Yen'fay.
Azura	Fire Emblem Fates	Nintendo 3DS	Princess of Valla and Nohr, daughter of Queen Arete, stepdaughter of King Garon, and stepsister of Xander, Camilla, Corrin, Leo, Elise, Ryoma, Hinoka, Takumi and Elise.
Camilla	Fire Emblem Fates	Nintendo 3DS	First princess of Nohr and older daughter of King Garon. Sister of Nohrian princes Xander and Leo, older sister of Princesses Elise and Corrin; stepsister of Princess Azura.
Corrin (Avatar)	Fire Emblem Fates	Nintendo 3DS	The player may choose to control either a female character (Nohr Princess), or a male character (Nohr Prince).
Elise	Fire Emblem Fates	Nintendo 3DS	Second princess of Nohr and younger daughter of King Garon. Sister of Nohrian princes Xander and Leo, youngest sister of Princesses Camilla and Corrin; stepsister of Princess Azura.
Hinoka	Fire Emblem Fates	Nintendo 3DS	First princess of Hoshido, older daughter of King Sumeragi and Queen Ikona; older stepdaughter of Queen Mikoto. Sister of Princes Ryoma and Takumi and older sister of Princess Sakura.
Sakura	Fire Emblem Fates	Nintendo 3DS	Second princess of Hoshido, younger daughter of King Sumeragi and Queen Ikona; stepdaughter of Queen Mikoto, younger sister of Princess Hinoka and Princes Ryoma and Takumi.
Celica	Fire Emblem Gaiden; Fire Emblem Echoes: Shadows of Valentia	Famicom; Nintendo 3DS	Also known as Anthiese. She is the princess of Zofia, daughter of King Lima IV and Liprica, half-sister of Conrad, and one of the main characters of the game.
Altena	Fire Emblem: Genealogy of the Holy War	Super Famicom	Princess of Leonster and the sister of Prince Leif.
Julia	Fire Emblem: Genealogy of the Holy War	Super Famicom	The scion of Naga and the princess of Grannvale.
Lachesis	Fire Emblem: Genealogy of the Holy War	Super Famicom	Princess of Nordion and younger half-sister of Eldigan.
Ayra	Fire Emblem: Genealogy of the Holy War	Super Famicom	Princess of Isaach, daughter of King Mananan and uncle of Crown Prince Shannan.
The Princesses	Fire Emblem Heroes	Android; iOS	Sharena, the princess of the Askr Kingdom and younger sister of Prince Alfonse.; Veronica, the princess of the Emblian Empire and younger half-sister of Prince Bruno.; Gunnthrá, the first princess of the Nifl Kingdom.; Fjorm, the second princess of the Nifl Kingdom and middle sister of Gunnthrá and Yglr.; Ylgr, the third princess of the Nifl Kingdom and youngest sister of Gunnthrá and Fjorm.; Laegjarn, the first princess of the Múspell Kingdom, older daughter of King Surtr.; Laevatein, the second princess of the Múspell Kingdom, younger daughter of King Surtr, and younger sister of Laegjarn.; Eir, the princess of Hel and the adoptive daughter of Queen Hel.; Reginn, the princess of Niðavellir and the younger sister of King Fáfnir and Prince Ótr.
Sheena	Fire Emblem: Mystery of the Emblem; Fire Emblem: New Mystery of the Emblem	Super Famicom; Nintendo DS	Princess of Gra and daughter of King Jiol.
Princess Yuliya	Fire Emblem: Mystery of the Emblem; Fire Emblem: New Mystery of the Emblem	Super Famicom; Nintendo DS	Princess of Grust.
Elincia	Fire Emblem: Path of Radiance	GameCube	She is the Princess of Crimea, daughter of King Ramon, and one of the main characters of the game. She later becomes Queen of Crimea in Fire Emblem: Radiant Dawn.
Leanne	Fire Emblem: Path of Radiance	GameCube	The white-winged Heron princess of Serenes, daughter of King Lorazieh, and younger sister of Rafiel and Reyson.
Caeda	Fire Emblem: Shadow Dragon and the Blade of Light; Fire Emblem: Shadow Dragon	Famicom; Nintendo DS	Princess of Talys, daughter of King Mostyn, and one of the main characters of the game.
Elice	Fire Emblem: Shadow Dragon and the Blade of Light; Fire Emblem: Shadow Dragon	Famicom; Nintendo DS	Princess of Altea, daughter of King Cornelius and Queen Liza; older sister of Prince Marth.
Maria	Fire Emblem: Shadow Dragon and the Blade of Light; Fire Emblem: Shadow Dragon	Famicom; Nintendo DS	Second princess of Macedon and youngest sister of Michalis and Minerva.
Minerva	Fire Emblem: Shadow Dragon and the Blade of Light; Fire Emblem: Shadow Dragon	Famicom; Nintendo DS	First princess of Macedon and younger sister of King Michalis.
Nyna	Fire Emblem: Shadow Dragon and the Blade of Light; Fire Emblem: Shadow Dragon	Famicom; Nintendo DS	Princess of Archanea.
Tiki	Fire Emblem: Shadow Dragon and the Blade of Light; Fire Emblem: Shadow Dragon	Famicom; Nintendo DS	A young Manakete princess of the Divine Dragon tribe and the daughter of Naga. She later becomes a priestess in Fire Emblem Awakening.
Guinivere	Fire Emblem: The Binding Blade	GBA	Princess of Bern, daughter of King Desmond and Queen Hellene; younger sister of King Zephiel.
Hellene	Fire Emblem: The Binding Blade	GBA	A former princess from Etruria. She becomes Queen of Bern as the wife of King Desmond and the mother of King Zephiel and Princess Guinivere.
Eirika	Fire Emblem: The Sacred Stones	GBA	A princess from Renais, twin sister of Prince Ephrain, and one of the main characters in the game.
L'Arachel	Fire Emblem: The Sacred Stones	GBA	Princess of Rausten and niece of the Divine Emperor Mansel.
Tana	Fire Emblem: The Sacred Stones	GBA	Princess of Frelia and younger sister of Prince Innes.
Edelgard von Hresvelg	Fire Emblem: Three Houses	Nintendo Switch	The imperial princess and heir apparent of the Adrestian Empire and the leader of the Black Eagles. She disguises herself as a male figure called the "Flame Emperor" so that she can work against the Church of Seiros.
Petra Macneary	Fire Emblem: Three Houses	Nintendo Switch	The crown princess and heir to the throne of Brigid and the member of the Black Eagles. She is hold as political hostage by the Adrestian Empire.
Lianna	Fire Emblem Warriors	Nintendo Switch; New Nintendo 3DS	Princess of the Aytolis Kingdom, daughter of Queen Yelena, and older twin sister of Prince Rowan.
Princess Dar	Frogger: The Great Quest	PS2; Windows	The vampire princess, and the daughter of Count Blah of the Catacombs, who is not the princess Frogger has been searching for.
Princess Holly	Frogger: The Great Quest	PS2; Windows	The fairy princess who rules Fairy Town but is not the princess Frogger has been looking for.
Princess Joy	Frogger: The Great Quest	PS2; Windows	The princess who resides in Joy Castle and is the one Frogger has been looking for. She also appears in Frogger Advance: The Great Quest.
Princess Robyn	Gemfire	MSX; NES; SNES; Mega Drive/Genesis; MS-DOS; NEC PC-9801; FM Towns; X68000; NEC PC-8801; Windows	The daughter of the tyrannical King Eselred of Ishmeria.
Kiichi Minazuru	Genji: Dawn of the Samurai	PS2	She is the daughter of Kiichi Hogen of the Tamayoribito clan who is usually referred to as "Princess Minazuru" in the video game loosely based on The Tale of the Heike.
Traveler's Sibling	Genshin Impact	Android; iOS; Windows; PS4; PS5	The player may choose either a female (Princess of the Abyss Order) or male character (Prince of the Abyss Order).
Astrid	Gensō Suikoden: Tsumugareshi Hyakunen no Toki	PlayStation Portable	She is a princess of the Holy Aionian Empire who is called the "Empress General" as the leader of the imperial army.
Princess Prin-Prin	Ghosts 'n Goblins series	Various	Also known as Princess Guinevere.
Princess Tiramisu	Kaeru no Tame ni Kane wa Naru	Game Boy	The princess of the Mille-Feuille Kingdom.
Princess Zelda	The Legend of Zelda series	Game & Watch; Game Boy; GBC; GBA; Nintendo DS; Nintendo DSi; 3DS; NES; SNES; N64; GameCube; Wii; Wii U; VC; Nintendo Switch	In most of the games, Zelda is the daughter of the King of Hyrule, but in others, she is the reigning monarch. She is associated with the goddess Nayru and the Triforce of Wisdom.
Princess Hilda	The Legend of Zelda: A Link Between Worlds	3DS	Ruler of Lorule.
Mipha	The Legend of Zelda: Breath of the Wild	Wii U; Nintendo Switch	Princess of the Zoras, daughter of King Dorephan and sister of Prince Sidon. She is one of Link's allies.
Deku Princess	The Legend of Zelda: Majora's Mask	N64; GameCube	Member of the Deku Royal Family and princess of the Deku Palace in Termina. She also appears in The Legend of Zelda: Majora's Mask 3D.
Princess Ruto	The Legend of Zelda: Ocarina of Time	N64; GameCube; iQue Player; VC	Princess of the Zoras and only child of King Zora. She also appears in The Legend of Zelda: Ocarina of Time 3D.
Princess Styla	The Legend of Zelda: Tri Force Heroes	Nintendo 3DS	Princess of Hytopia and daughter of King Tuft.
Midna	The Legend of Zelda: Twilight Princess	Wii; GameCube	Appearing in Twilight Princess, she is the princess of the Twilight Realm who was cursed into an imp-like form by Zant.
Wolf Princess	The Liar Princess and the Blind Prince	Vita; Switch; PS4; iOS; Android	She is a singing wolf who makes a deal with the witch to transform into a human princess in exchange for her voice and wishes for the eyes of the prince to be healed.
Princess Kurusale Cherie "Kururu" Marl Q.	Little Princess: Marl Ōkoku no Ningyō Hime 2	PlayStation; PlayStation Network	Daughter of Cornet and King Ferdinand Marl E. and the main character of the game.
Princess Elodie	Long Live the Queen	Windows; Mac OS X; Linux	She was the princess of Nova who has been training to become a new queen after her mother's death.
Princess Shroob	Mario & Luigi: Partners in Time	Nintendo DS	The evil co-ruler of the alien race called the Shroobs, alongside her sister Elder Princess Shroob; the primary antagonist of the game.
Princess Luxy	Marvel Land	Arcade; Mega Drive	Also known as Wondra in English.
Princess Pride	Mega Man Battle Network 2	GBA	The princess of Creamland and the operator of KnightMan.
Sarah Lotte Cornelia	Mobius Final Fantasy	iOS; Android; Windows	Princess of Palamecia.
Kitana	Mortal Kombat	Arcade	She is the Princess of Edenia, and the stepdaughter of Emperor Shao Kahn of Outworld, who uses a pair of steel fans for most of her special attacks.
Mileena	Mortal Kombat	Arcade	She was Kitana's clone mixed with Tarkatan DNA.
Momohime	Muramasa: The Demon Blade	Wii; PlayStation Vita	She is the princess of the Narukami clan, and younger sister of Torahime, who fights demon possession against the spirit of vengeful rōnin Jinkuro Izuna. Voiced by Miyuki Sawashiro.
Princess Elise	My World, My Way	Nintendo DS; PSP	
The Princess	Ninja Hayate	Arcade; Sega CD; PlayStation; Saturn	
Gwyndolyn	Odin Sphere	PS2; PS3; PS4; Vita	The valkyrie princess of the warrior realm of Ragnanival, and younger daughter of Demon Lord Odin, who lives for years in the shadow of her older sister Princess Griselda. Voiced by Mia Bradly in English and Ayako Kawasumi in Japanese.
Mercedes	Odin Sphere	PS2; PS3; PS4; Vita	Formerly the princess, she becomes a reluctant queen of the Fairy Kingdom of Ringford following the death of her mother Queen Elfaria. Voiced by Jennifer Sekiguchi in English and Mamiko Noto in Japanese.
Velvet	Odin Sphere	PS2; PS3; PS4; Vita	The survival princess from the destroyed Kingdom of Valentine, maternal granddaughter of the villainous King Valentine, and Gwyndolyn's half-sister. She hides her identity as Demon Lord Odin's illegitimate daughter. Voiced by Michelle Ruff in English and Miyuki Sawashiro in Japanese.
Princess Sakuya	Ōkami	PS2; Wii; PS3 (PSN)	Wood sprite and guardian of Kamiki Village.
Lady Bow	Paper Mario	Nintendo 64; iQue Player	The princess-like leader of the Boos and one of Mario's eight allies.
Maia	Phantasy Star III	Genesis	She is the Layan princess of Cille.
Hariette Renata Reina Cuento	Phantasy Star Online 2	Windows; Vita; PS4; Xbox One; Switch; Xbox Series X/S	She is the princess of the Magic Kingdom of Cuento.
Rayfa Padma Khura'in Padma Khura'in	Phoenix Wright: Ace Attorney − Spirit of Justice	Nintendo 3DS	The crown princess of a small Asian county, the Kingdom of Khura'in, and a royal priestess of the Khura'inism religion. By post-game she has become in-line as Queen, with his brother acting as regent in her place. She is known by the official address of "Her Benevolence".
The Princess	Prince of Persia (1989)	Apple II	The daughter of the Sultan.
Princess Elika	Prince of Persia (2008)	PS3; Xbox 360; Windows	Princess of Ahura and daughter of the Mourning King. Voiced by Kari Wahlgren.
Princess Farah	Prince of Persia: The Sands of Time	GBA; PS2; GameCube; Xbox; Windows; Mobile; PS3	Also appears in Prince of Persia: The Two Thrones, she is the daughter of the Maharajah of India. Voiced by Joanna Wasick and Helen King.
Eustiana "Pecorine" von Astraea	Princess Connect! Re:Dive	Android; iOS; DMM	The swordswoman and Guide Master of the Gourmet Edifice guild, she is a human princess whose country of Landsol develops Legends of Astrum. Voiced by M・A・O.
Gradriel Do Valendia	Princess Crown	Saturn; PSP	The 13-year-old princess who has been set to become the new queen and savior of her kingdom of Valendia after the death of her mother Queen Elfaran De Valendia.
Leticia La Mew Symphonia	Princess Holiday	Windows; Dreamcast; PS2	
Minerva	Princess Minerva	NEC PC-9801; PC Engine; Super Famicom	She is a princess of the kingdom of Whistler and an eponymous protagonist of the game who has been threatened by the evil sorceress Dynastar to kidnap all women but soon leaves with her eight female bodyguards to defeat her. Voiced by Miki Itō.
The Princesses	Princess Quest	Saturn; IBM PC compatibles	Churros, princess of Rouresu. Voiced by Ai Orikasa.; Custard, princess of Rarian. Voiced by Sakura Tange.; Gelato, princess of Soodaresu. Voiced by Mifuyu Hiiragi.; Millefeuille, princess of Northland. Voiced by Yuri Shiratori.; Pannacotta, princess of Gimuria. Voiced by Kikuko Inoue.
Princess Tomato	Princess Tomato in the Salad Kingdom	NEC PC-8801; NEC PC-6001; FM-7; MSX; NES/Famicom; VC	
Eclair	La Pucelle: Tactics	PS2; PSP	Princess of Paprika. Voiced by Amber Hood in English and Natsuko Kuwatani in Japanese.
Princess Serephine	Puzzle Quest: Challenge of the Warlords	Nintendo DS; PlayStation Portable; Windows; Wii; iOS; Xbox 360; PS2; PS3	Runaway daughter of the Emperor, who becomes a companion if the player chooses to rescue her from being forced into an arranged marriage.
Princess Irieth/Kisala	Rogue Galaxy	PlayStation 2	She is the lost princess, and later queen, of the planet Mariglenn who has been adopted by Captain Dorgengoa of the Dorgenark pirate ship but is actually the biological daughter of King Albioth and Queen Freidias. Voiced by Natalie Lander in English and Aya Ueto in Japanese.
Princess Cassidy	The Royal Trap	Windows; Mac OS X; Linux	The heir and future queen of Gwellinor, and the sister of Prince Calum, who has been kidnapped during the party held in her honor.
Princess Kurumi	Sega Ninja	Arcade; SG-1000; Master System	The ninja princess who uses throwing knives and throwing stars to battle the enemies.
Princess Elis	Shining Force II	Sega Mega Drive	She is the princess of Granseal.
Rufina	Shining Hearts	PlayStation Portable	She is the gentle princess of Wynderia and the younger sister of Prince Ragnus.
Princess Jessa	Shining in the Darkness	Sega Mega Drive	She is the princess of Thornwood.
Excella Noa Aura	Shining Resonance Refrain	PS3; PS4; Xbox One; Switch; Windows	The imperial princess and the top-tier dragon knight.
Sonia Blanche	Shining Resonance Refrain	PS3; PS4; Xbox One; Switch; Windows	The determined princess of Astoria.
Princess Camille	Shining Soul II	Game Boy Advance	Also known as Princess Cocotte in Japanese, she is the daughter of King Marcel and Queen Yvonne of Klantol.
Princess Satera	Shining Wisdom	Saturn	
Princesses Puripuri and Puchipuchi	Snow Bros.	Arcade; Game Boy; NES; Sega Mega Drive; Android; iOS	Also known in the NES port as Princesses Teri and Tina, they are the twin princesses who have been taken captive by the evil King Scorch. One of them reappears in the following sequel Snow Bros. 2: With New Elves.
Blaze the Cat	Sonic Rush; Sonic the Hedgehog; Sonic Rush Adventure	Nintendo DS; Xbox 360; PS3	An anthropomorphic cat and the princess of the Sol Empire.
Tikal The Echidna	Sonic Adventure; Sonic Adventure 2	Dreamcast; GameCube; Windows; Xbox 360; PS3	The daughter of Chief Pachacamac (deceased) from the Knuckles Clan (deceased) in the Mystic Ruins of Angel Island.
Princess Elise III	Sonic the Hedgehog	Xbox 360; PS3	The ruler of Soleanna who Sonic escorts from the evil Doctor Eggman multiple times. Voiced by Lacey Chabert in English and Maaya Sakamoto in Japanese.
Hildegard von Krone	Soulcalibur IV	PS3; Xbox 360	Better known as "Hilde".
Princess Ami	Spyro: Year of the Dragon; Spyro Reignited Trilogy	PlayStation; PS4; Xbox One; Windows; Switch	The fairy princess of Charmed Ridge who has been engaged to marry the feline prince Azrael and gives a dragon egg to Spyro.
Princess Popcorn	Starflyers	Windows; Mac	She is the princess, and later queen, of Planet Pop-a-Lot, though in real life it is Katie Cadet's mother, in "Royal Jewel Rescue".
Elena	Street Fighter III: New Generation	Arcade; Dreamcast	An African princess from Kenya and younger daughter of Chief Jafari.
Ailish	Sudeki	Xbox; Windows	Princess of Illumina, daughter of Queen Lusica, and one of the main characters of the game.
Jillia Blight	Suikoden II	PlayStation; Windows; Switch; PS4; Xbox One	She is a princess of the Highland Kingdom, and the half-sister of the villainous Luca Blight, who marries Jowy Atreides.
Flare En Kuldes	Suikoden IV	PlayStation 2	She is the daughter of King Lino En Kuldes and the princess of Obel.
Lymsleia "Lym" Falenas	Suikoden V	PlayStation 2	She is the princess and heir of the Queendom of Falena, the younger sister of the Prince and the daughter of Queen Arshtat and Ferid Egan.
Corselia	Suikoden Tactics	PlayStation 2	She is the former princess whose grandfather Julius was the last emperor of the Kooluk Empire.
Phara Mir Celestia	Summon Night X: Tears Crown	Nintendo DS	She is the princess and heir of the Kingdom of Celestia, daughter of King Novice Won Celestia and younger sister of Prince Noin, and the female protagonist of the game. Voiced by Minori Chihara.
Sprixie Princesses	Super Mario 3D World	Wii U	The seven fairy princesses of the Sprixie Kingdom: Green Sprixie Princess; Yellow Sprixie Princess; Blue Sprixie Princess; Orange Sprixie Princess; Purple Sprixie Princess; Cyan Sprixie Princess; Red Sprixie Princess
Princess Peach Toadstool	Super Mario Bros.	NES	Princess Peach is the sovereign of the Mushroom Kingdom, a principality in Nintendo's Mario series.
Rosalina	Super Mario Galaxy	Wii	A princess from outer space who lives in the Comet Observatory.
Princess Daisy	Super Mario Land	Game Boy	Ruler of Sarasaland.
Princess Dee-Dee	Super Monkey Ball Adventure	GameCube; PS2; PSP	The monkey princess of Kongri-la.
Princess Terria	Tail Concerto	PlayStation	She is an adventurous dog princess of the floating kingdom of Prairie. Voiced by Carrie Gordon Lowrey in English and Maaya Sakamoto in Japanese
Natalia Luzu Kimlasca-Lanvaldear	Tales of the Abyss	PS2; 3DS	Princess of Kimlasca-Lanvaldear, though not by birth. Natalia was taken to replace the stillborn Kimlascan princess. She is the biological daughter of Largo the Black Lion and Sylvia, the midwife's daughter. She is a fiancée of Luke fon Fabre, the game's protagonist.
Kaguya Houraisan	Touhou Project	Windows	Essentially Kaguya-hime from The Tale of the Bamboo Cutter. However, in this version of events it explains that she never returned to the moon, instead going into hiding on earth.
Yuyuko Saigyouji	Touhou Project	Windows	The ghost princess of Hakugyokurou, part of the Netherworld.
Angela	Trials of Mana	Super Famicom; Switch; Windows; PS4	She is the princess of the Magic Kingdom of Altena and one of the main protagonists of the game. In the video game remake, she is voiced by Sarah Miller-Crews in English and Rumi Ookubo in Japanese.
Riesz	Trials of Mana	Super Famicom; Switch; Windows; PS4	She is the princess of the Wind Kingdom of Laurent and one of six main characters of the game. She is voiced by Brittany Cox in English and Mikako Komatsu in Japanese in the video game remake.
Cordelia Glenbrook	Triangle Strategy	Nintendo Switch	The princess whose Kingdom of Glenbrook has been seized by the villainous Archduke Gustadolph Aesfrost. She is the younger sister of Princes Roland and Frani and the daughter of the late King Regna. Voiced by Rosie Day in English and Reina Ueda in Japanese.
Frederica Aesfrost	Triangle Strategy	Nintendo Switch	The princess of the Grand Duchy of Aesfrost and the member of the House Wolffort War Council whose mother Orlaea was a hero who freed the Rosellan people during the Saltiron War. She is the half-sister of Archduke Gustadolph and betorthed to protagonist Serenoa Wolffort. Voiced by Emma Ballantine in English and Minami Tsuda in Japanese.
Cordelia gi Randgriz	Valkyria Chronicles	PS3; Windows; PS4	Cordelia is formerly the crown princess of Gallia. She later becomes the archduchess in Valkyria Chronicles II. Voiced by Kate Higgins (English) and Mamiko Noto (Japanese).
Ophelia Augusta af Jutland	Valkyria Revolution	PS4; Vita; Xbox One	Princess of Jutland and one of the main characters in the game.
Jelanda	Valkyrie Profile	PlayStation; PSP; iOS; Android	Sorceress princess of Artolia.
Alicia	Valkyrie Profile 2: Silmeria	PlayStation 2	The princess of Dipan, the only daughter of King Barbarossa, and one of the main characters of the game. Voiced by Michelle Ruff in English and Akiko Yajima in Japanese.
Archer Princesses	Valkyrie Profile 2: Silmeria	PlayStation 2	Chrystie, runaway princess of Paltierre. Voiced by Hunter MacKenzie Austin in English and Yuri Amano in Japanese.; Lydia, princess of Crell Monferaigne. Voiced by Erica Lenhart in English and Yuri Amano in Japanese.
Princess Shokora	Wario Land 4	GBA	A cursed princess from an ancient kingdom.
Princess Priscilla	Wizard and the Princess	Apple II; Atari 8-bit; Commodore 64; IBM PC; IBM PCjr; FM-7; PC-88; PC-98	The princess of Serenia and daughter of King George IV.
Princess of Elrond	Wizards & Warriors	NES	
Princess Elaine	Wizards & Warriors X: The Fortress of Fear	Game Boy	
Melia Antiqua	Xenoblade Chronicles	Wii; New Nintendo 3DS	Mage and crown princess of the High Entia. Voiced by Shiori Katsuta (original Japanese) and Jenna Coleman (English dub).
Elaine Laccius	Xexex	Arcade	Princess of the planet E-Square. Voiced by Sumi Shimamoto.
Yggdra Yuril Artwaltz	Yggdra Union: We'll Never Fight Alone	Game Boy Advance; PlayStation Portable; Nintendo Switch; Android; iOS	Princess of Fantasinia and leader of the Royal Liberation Army.
Feena Fam Earthlight	Yoake Mae yori Ruriiro na	Windows; PS2; PSP	She is a princess from the Kingdom of Sphere on the moon who lives on Earth in a homestay with the family of the deputy librarian in the royal moon museum, Sayaka Hozumi. Feena is voiced by Maki Tezuka in PC, and by Hitomi Nabatame in PS2 and anime.

== Web ==
Princess	Origin	Notes
Princess Ai No Miko	AdventureQuest Worlds	Princess of Yokai Island. Also known as "Princess Miko".
Princess Brittany	AdventureQuest Worlds	Princess Royal of Swordhaven, eldest daughter of King Alteon and heir to the throne of Swordhaven. Wife of Lord Brentan, Guardian of the Neverglades.
Princess Victoria	AdventureQuest Worlds	Rebellious second daughter of King Alteon. Better known (though unbeknownst to her overprotective father) as "Robina the Hood".
Princess Tara	AdventureQuest Worlds	Youngest daughter of King Alteon.
Feferi Peixes	Homestuck	The heiress of the Alternian Empire and the descendant of Her Imperious Condescension. SBURB title is "Witch Of Life".

== See also ==
- Princess and dragon
- List of fictional princes
- List of fictional monarchs (fictional countries)
- List of fictional nobility
