= Evil Queen =

The Evil Queen
- Snow White character
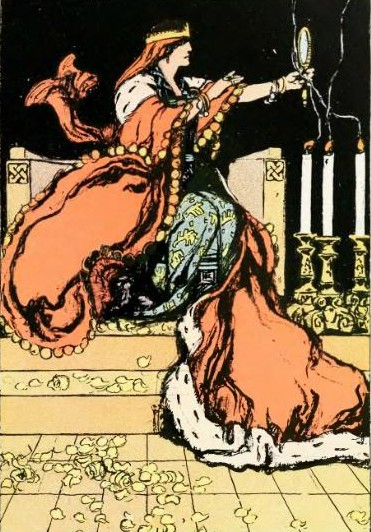
- The Evil Queen with her mirror in an American illustration from 1913
- First appearance: Grimms' Fairy Tales (1812)
- Created by: The Brothers Grimm (adapted from pre-existing fairy tales)

In-universe information
- Occupation: Queen consort, witch (secretly)
- Spouse: King (unnamed)
- Children: Snow White (daughter in the original version, stepdaughter since the 1819 revision) Evie (Descendants franchise)

The Evil Queen (German: böse Königin), also called the Wicked Queen or simply the Queen, is a fictional character and the main antagonist of "Snow White", a German fairy tale recorded by the Brothers Grimm. In the Grimm's story, the Queen is obsessed with being "the fairest in the land". When the Queen's magic mirror reveals that the young princess Snow White is considered more beautiful than her, the Queen decides to kill Snow White using witchcraft. When this attempt fails, Snow White is rescued and the Queen is executed for her crimes. A stock character of this type also appears in a number of other fairy tales and legends.

The Grimms' tale is didactic, meant as a warning to young children against the dangers of narcissism, pride, and hubris, and demonstrates a triumph of good over evil. In some revisions, however, the Queen has been reworked or portrayed more sympathetically, serving as the protagonist, antihero, or tragic hero. Her many variants in adaptations notably include the Disney version.

== Brothers Grimm tale ==
=== Story ===
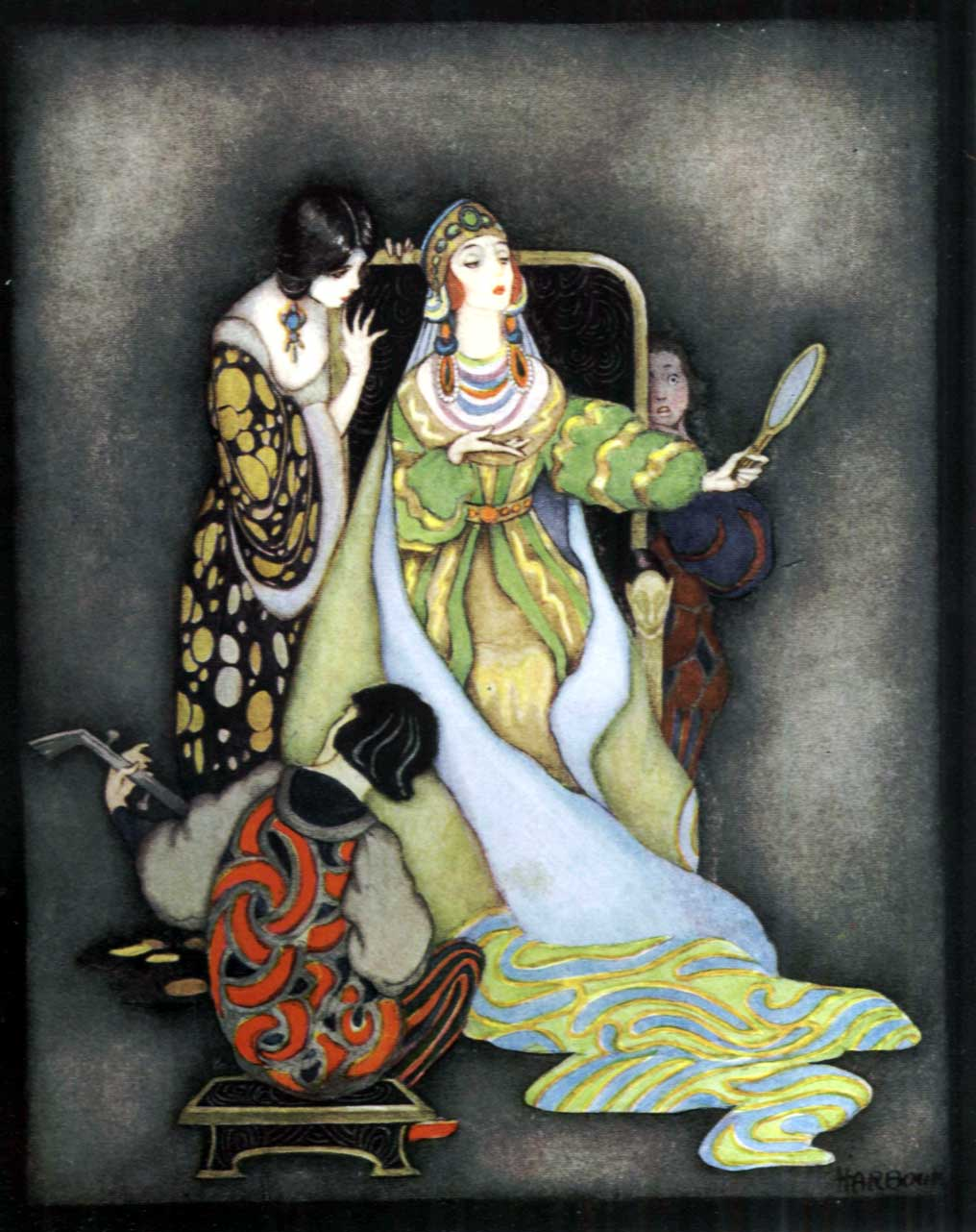
The queen with her mirror in Jennie Harbour's illustration for My Favorite Book of Fairy Tales (1921)

In the original tale from 1812, the Evil Queen wishes to have a beautiful child, and Snow White is born. In the later 1819 edition, she marries the King following the death of his first wife, Snow White's mother. In all versions, she is obsessed with her own beauty, and the Queen stands before a magic mirror every morning to confirm that she is the most beautiful, thus validating her vanity. One morning, the mirror informs her that the seven-year-old Princess Snow White, has surpassed her in beauty "a thousand times". Furious, the Queen formulates a plan to kill Snow White. The Queen orders her Huntsman to lure Snow White into the forest to murder her. The Queen tells him to bring back the child's lungs and liver as proof that the princess is dead. However, the Huntsman takes pity on Snow White and instead, he brings the Queen the lungs and liver of a wild boar. The Queen or (in some retellings) a cook prepares the lungs and liver, believing them to be Snow White's organs, and the Queen eats them.

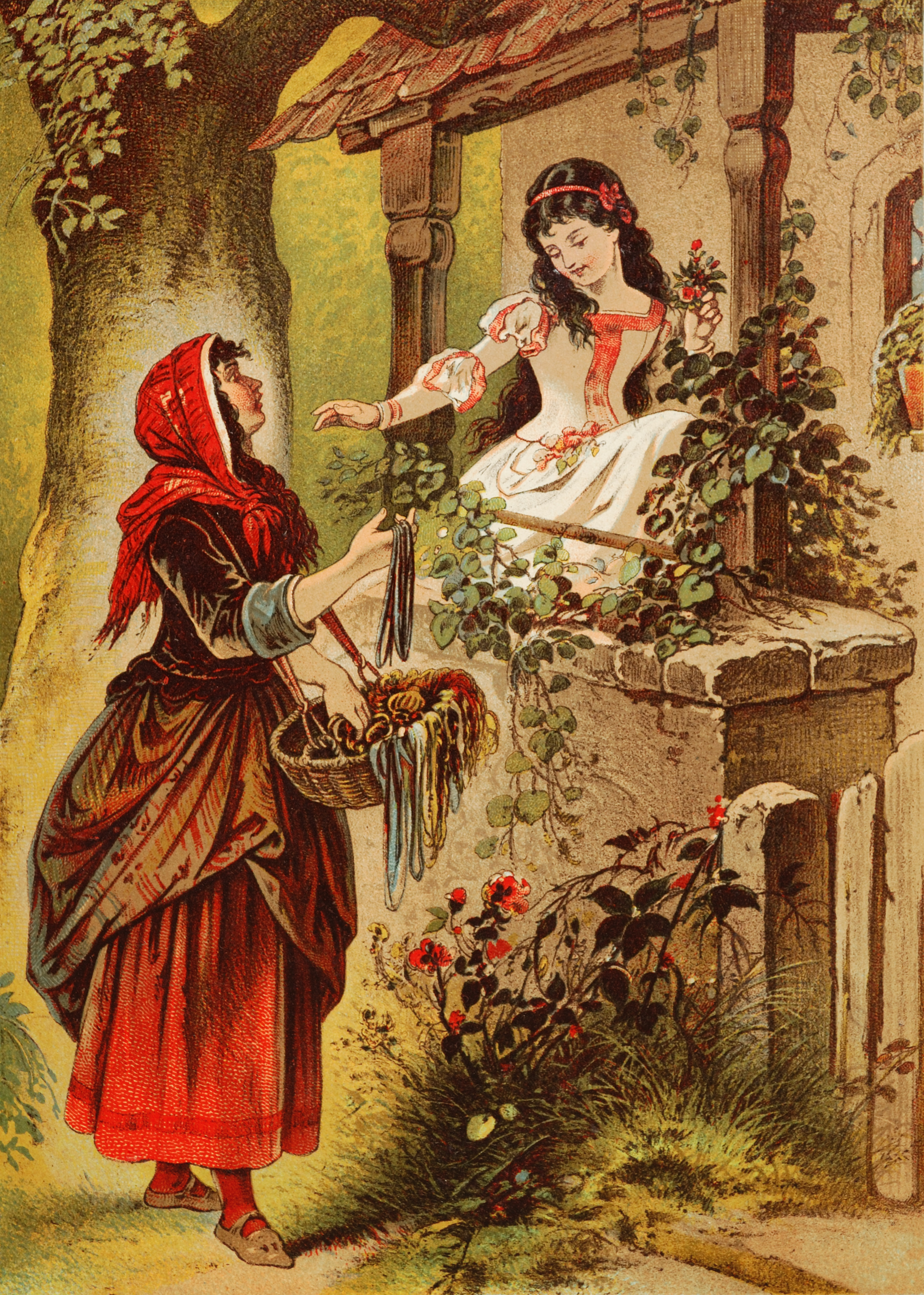
The Queen in disguise offers lace to Snow White in a late 19th-century German illustration

After questioning her mirror again, the Queen discovers that Snow White has survived and found sanctuary with the Seven Dwarfs. Intending to kill Snow White herself, she takes on the disguise of an old peddler woman. Under this guise, she visits the dwarfs' house and sells Snow White laces for a corset. The Queen intentionally laces the corset too tight in an attempt to suffocate Snow White. When this fails, the Queen returns again, this time as a comb seller, and tricks Snow White into using a poisoned comb created through the art of witchcraft. When the comb also fails to kill Snow White, the Queen proclaims, "Snow White shall die… even if it costs me my life!" She again visits Snow White, disguised as a farmer's wife, and gives her half of a red, beautiful apple that had been poisoned, which places Snow White in a deep sleep. However, Snow White is awakened by a kiss from a Prince from another kingdom and they invite the Queen to their wedding. Although she fears what will happen, the Queen's jealousy drives her to attend. At the celebration, she is forced to put on red-hot iron shoes and dance until she drops dead.

=== Origins and evolution ===
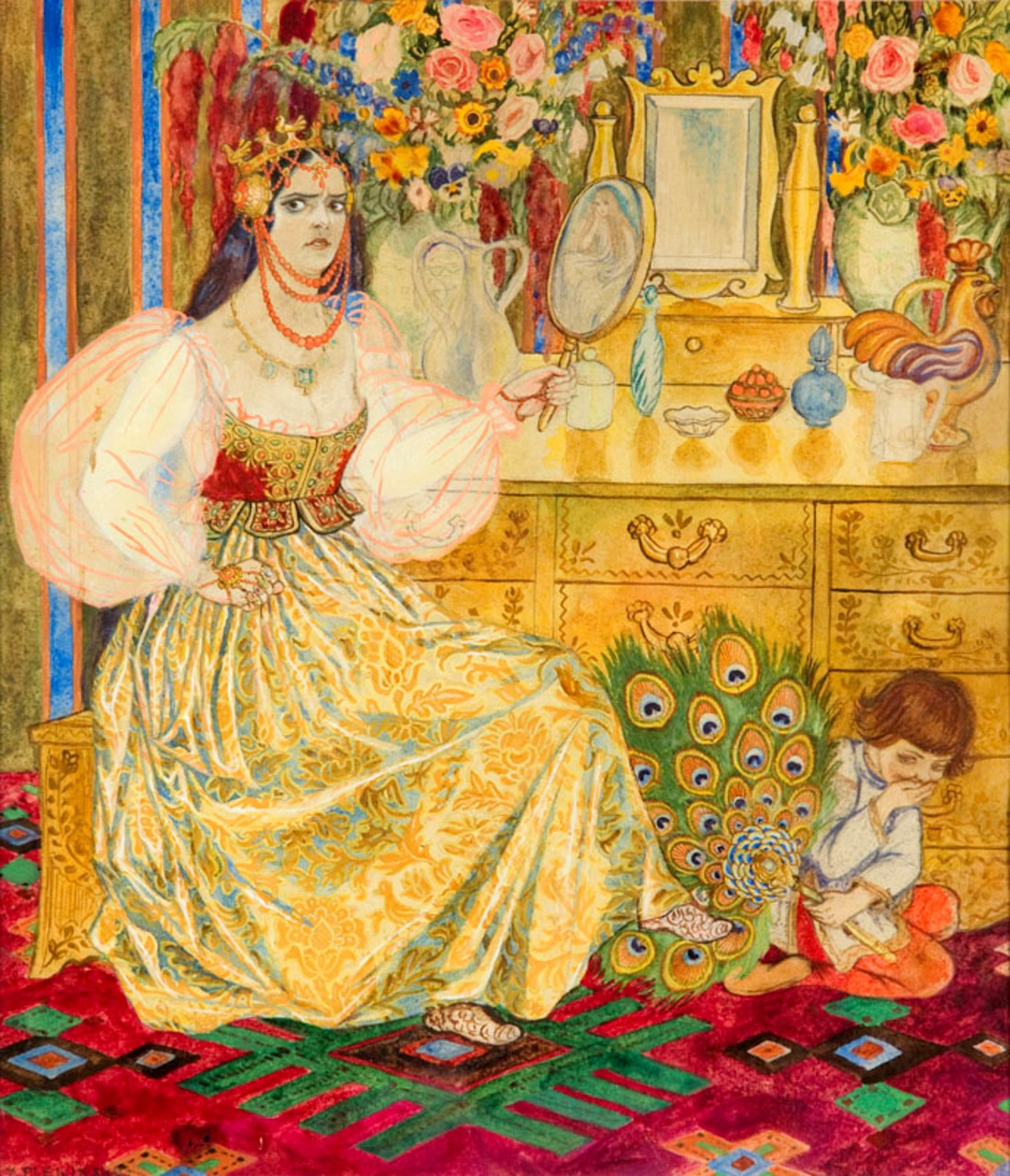
A Polish illustration by Zofia Plewińska-Smidowiczowa

In the first print edition of the Brothers Grimm story from their 1812/1815 collection Kinder- und Hausmärchen ("Children's and Household Tales"), the Queen is Snow White's biological mother. At the beginning of the story, she is sewing at an open window when she pricks her finger with her needle, causing three drops of red blood to drip onto the white snow on the black ebony windowsill. She then wishes to have a daughter with skin as white as snow, lips as red as blood, and hair as black as ebony, and she later gives birth to Snow White (Snow Drop). In subsequent versions after 1819, this was changed; the text was added to include that Snow White's mother died and the King remarried. According to Jack Zipes, that change was made because the Grimms "held motherhood sacred". According to Cashdan, a "cardinal rule of fairy tales" mandates that the "heroes and heroines are allowed to kill witches, sorceresses, even stepmothers, but never their own mothers". Zipes' 2014 collection of Grimm fairy tales in their original forms reinstated the Queen as Snow White's mother. This revision was likely the work of Wilhelm Grimm. In the Brothers' original (unpublished) Ölenberg Manuscript (1810), the Queen herself abandons Snow White in a forest after taking her there to pick flowers, and ends up being punished by the returning King after he revives their daughter.

The wicked stepmother was not unknown in German versions predating the Brothers Grimm's collection. In 1782, Johann Karl August Musäus published a literary fairy tale titled "Richilde" which reimagined the folktale from the villain's point of view. The main character is Richilde, arrogant Countess of Brabant, who as a child received the gift of a magic mirror invented by her godfather Albertus Magnus. Many elements of the Grimms' Snow White appear in this story, including the wicked stepmother, the magic mirror, the poisoned apple, and the punishment of dancing in red-hot shoes. The Grimms knew of Snow White (1809), a play by their contemporary and rival Albert Ludwig Grimm (no relation to the Brothers Grimm), which according to Zipes "treated the Queen more gently".

Equivalents to the Evil Queen can be found in Snow White-like tales from around the world. In the Scottish Gaelic oral tale "Gold-Tree and Silver-Tree", the Queen is named Silver-Tree and is the heroine's biological mother. A talking trout takes the place of the Queen's mirror and the huntsman figure (often her lover in non-Grimm versions) is the princess's own father. The villain's relationship with Snow White can also vary, with versions from around the world sometimes featuring wicked sisters, wicked sisters-in-law, or a wicked mother of the prince. One early variation of the tale was Giambattista Basile's "The Young Slave" (1634). In this telling the heroine's mother is unintentionally involved in putting her to sleep. She is then awoken by her cruel and jealous aunt who treats her like a slave. Furthermore, the Evil Queen's tricks also vary from place to place. In Italy, she is found using a toxic comb, a contaminated cake, and a suffocating braid. In France, she is found using a poisoned tomato. There are many more examples. The Queen demands varying proof from the huntsman. In Spain, Snow White can be found needing to stop a bottle of blood with her toe; in Italy, it is the princess's intestines and blood-soaked shirt.

Oliver Madox Hueffer noted that the wicked stepmother with magical powers threatening a young princess is a recurring theme in fairy tales; one similar character is the witch-queen in "The Wild Swans" as told by Hans Christian Andersen. According to Kenny Klein, the Celtic enchantress Ceridwen of the Welsh mythology was "the quintessential evil stepmother, the origin of that character in the two tales of Snow White and Cinderella".

=== Violence and sanitisation ===
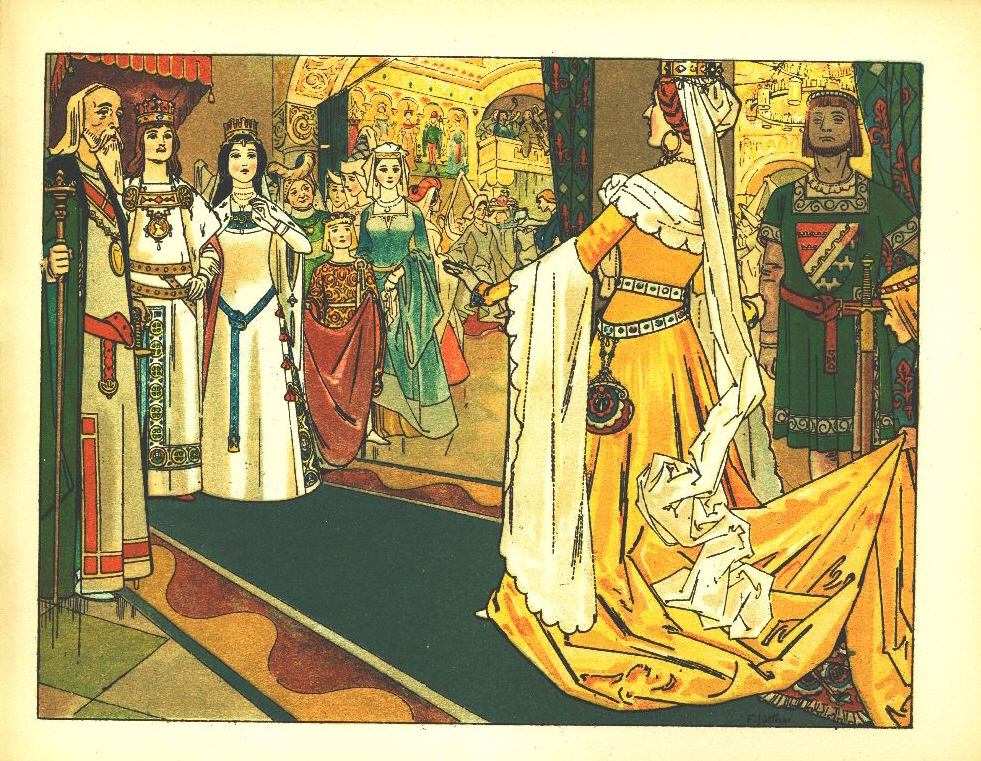
The Queen arrives at Snow White's wedding in a 1905 German illustration

In the classic ending of "Snow White", the Evil Queen is put to death by torture. However, such extreme punishment is often considered inappropriate for children. Already the first English translation of the Grimm's tale, written by Edgar Taylor in 1823, had the Queen choke on her own envy upon the sight of Snow White alive. An 1871 English translation by Susanna Mary Paull "replaces the Queen's death by cruel physical punishment with death by self-inflicted pain and self-destruction", as it is instead her own shoes that become hot due to her anger. Many modern revisions of the fairy tale also change the gruesome classic ending in order to make it less violent. As Sara Maitland wrote, "We do not tell this part of the story anymore; we say it is too cruel and will break children's soft hearts".

Alternative endings may have the Queen, for example, instantly drop dead "of anger" at the wedding or in front of her mirror upon learning of Snow White's survival, fall victim to her own designs going awry (such as through touching her own poisoned rose), die by nature (e.g., falling into quicksand on her way back to the castle after poisoning Snow White), killed by the dwarfs during a chase, destroyed by her own mirror, run away into the forest never to be seen again, or simply banished from the kingdom forever. In some versions, the Queen is merely prevented from committing further wrong-doings and does not die, but is banished or disappears; in others, she may die by accident. Fawzia Gilani-Williams's Snow White: An Islamic Tale, for instance, has Snow White forgive her evil witch stepmother entirely, making her repent and redeem herself, as part of the book's religious lessons for children.

Such revisions have been considered a softening of the original text and many today feel the story has become too "sanitized". Sheldon Cashdan, Professor of Psychology at the University of Massachusetts, argues that in accordance with the logic of fairy tales, the Queen could not be allowed to flee or merely be locked up, as fairy tale narrative demands that "the reader needs to know that the death of the witch is thorough and complete, even if it means exposing young readers to acts of violence that are extreme by contemporary standards". Conversely, writers such as Hueffer have expressed sympathy for the queen, or, like psychology professor Sharna Olfman, have removed the violence when reading the story to children, while also acknowledging that verbal storytelling lacks "graphic visual imagery".

=== Interpretations ===
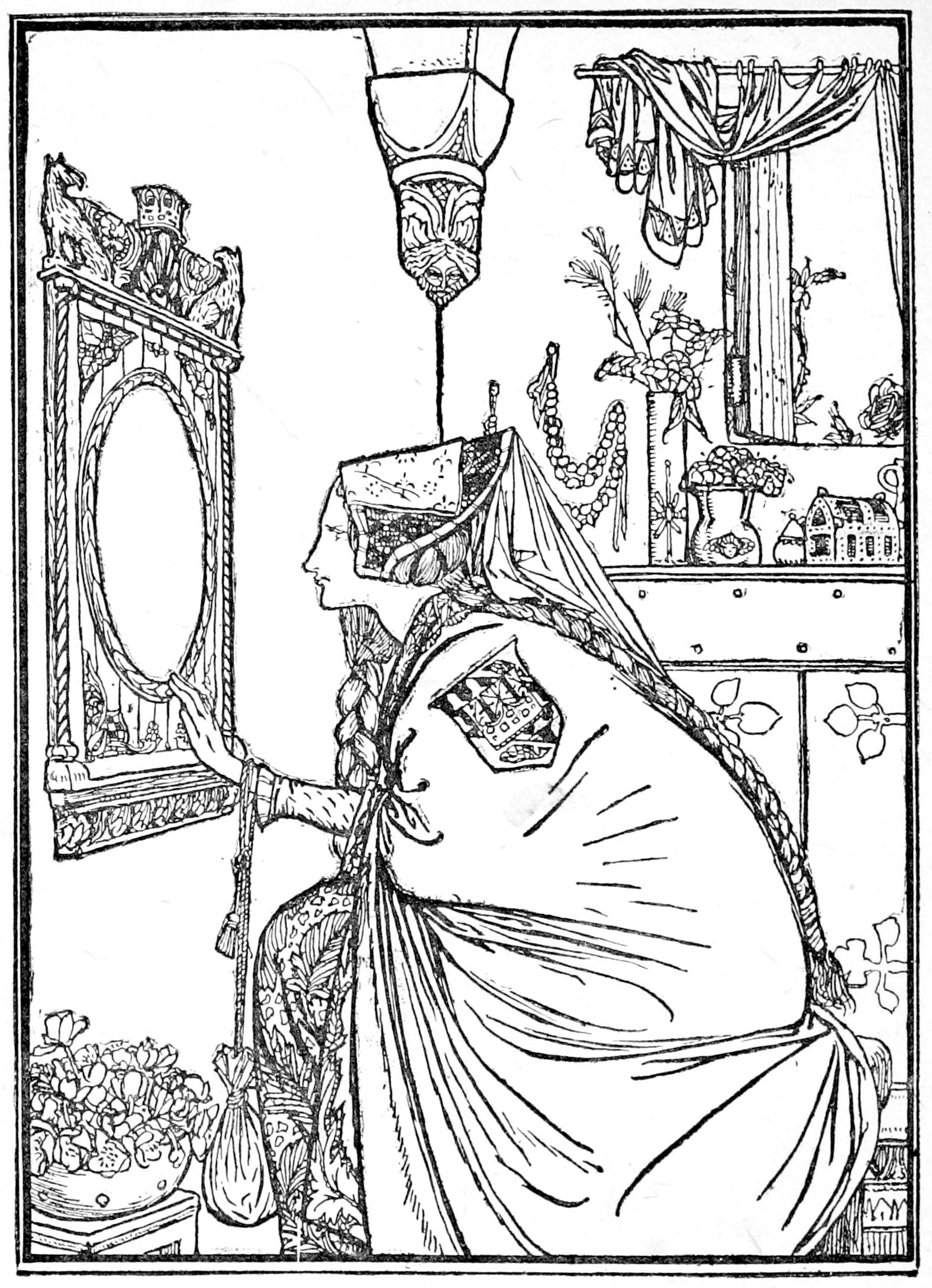
Robert Anning Bell's 1912 illustration

According to some scholars, such as Roger Sale and University of Hawaiʻi professor Cristina Bacchilega, the story has ageist undertones vilifying the older woman character, with her envy of Snow White's beauty. Terri Windling wrote that the Queen is "a woman whose power is derived from her beauty; it is this, the tale implies, that provides her place in the castle's hierarchy. If the king’s attention turns from his wife to another, what power is left to an aging woman? Witchcraft, the tale answers. Potions, poisons, and self-protection." Sandra Gilbert and Susan Gubar regard Snow White and her mother/stepmother as two female stereotypes, the angel and the monster. The fact that the Queen was Snow White's biological mother in the first version of the Grimms' story has led several psychoanalytic critics to interpret "Snow White" as a story about a repressed Oedipus complex, or about Snow White's Electra complex and sexual rivalry with the Queen. According to Bruno Bettelheim, the story's main motif is "the clash of sexual innocence and sexual desire": "whereas Snow White achieves inner harmony, her stepmother fails to do so. Unable to integrate the social and the antisocial aspects of human nature, she remains enslaved to her desires and gets caught up in an Oedipal competition with her daughter from which she cannot extricate herself. This imbalance between her contradictory drives proves to be her undoing." Cashdan interprets the Queen's motives as "fear that the king will find Snow White more appealing than her." This struggle so dominates the psychological landscape of the tale that Gilber and Gubar even proposed renaming the story "Snow White and Her Wicked Stepmother". Zipes considered it a story of a "natural" (in a patriarchal society) competition where the Queen "acts on behalf of her genes" as she seeks to both maintain her status as the most beautiful woman and to secure her own progeny. Harold Bloom opined that the three "temptations" all "testify to a mutual sexual attraction between Snow White and her stepmother." Trina Schart Hyman's illustrations for her picture book version show the Queen's mental suffering in her descent into madness caused by her jealousy in a psychological interpretation not contradicting the Brothers Grimm story but expanding on it.

The Brothers Grimm, who wrote their book as an "educational manual" (Erziehungsbuch), may have felt that a brutal punishment for a villain was a necessary element augmenting the happy endings of their tales, as in Snow White's ascent as new queen and triumph over her evil enemy. Cashdan proposes that the evil queen "embodies narcissism, and the young princess, with whom readers identify, embodies parts of the child struggling to overcome this tendency. Vanquishing the queen represents a triumph of positive forces in the self over vain impulses." As such, "the death of the witch signals a victory of virtue over vice, a sign that positive forces in the self have prevailed." In addition, "the active involvement of heroin in the witch's demise communicates to readers that they must take an active role in overcoming their own errant tendencies." Similarly, psychologist Betsy Cohen wrote about the perceived symbolism of the act: "In order to avoid becoming a wicked queen herself, Snow White needs to separate from and kill off this destructive force inside of her." In the words of Bettelheim, "only the death of the jealous queen (the elimination of all outer and inner turbulence) can make for a happy world."

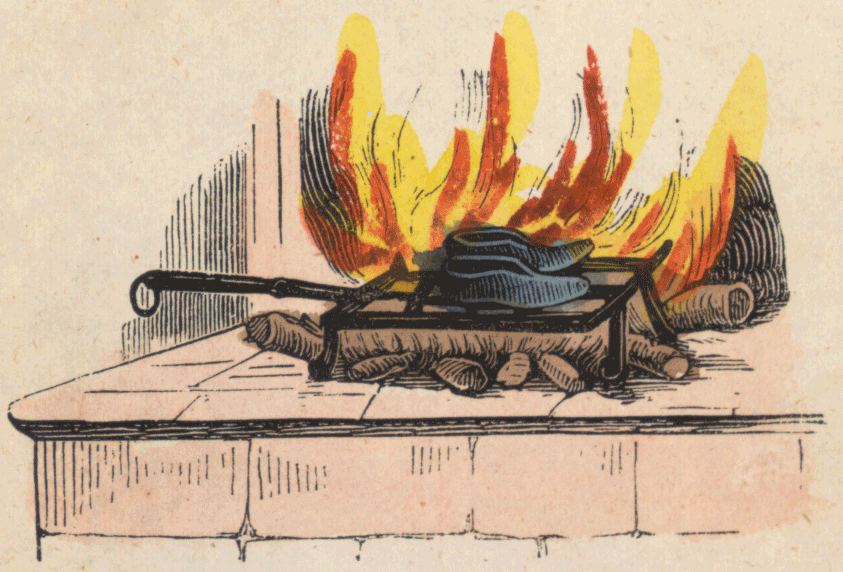
The iron shoes being heated in an 1852 Icelandic translation of the Grimms' story

Regarding the manner of the Queen's execution, scholars such as Cashdan, Sheldon Donald Haase, and John Hanson Saunders argue that from psychological and storytelling perspectives, the Queen's punishment fits her crimes, gives closure to the reader, and shows good triumphing over evil. Jo Eldridge Carney, Professor of English at The College of New Jersey, wrote: "Again, the fairy tale's system of punishment is horrific but apt: a woman so actively consumed with seeking affirmation from others and with violently undoing her rival is forced to enact her own physical destruction as a public spectacle." Likewise, Mary Ayers of the Stanford University School of Medicine wrote that the red-hot shoes symbolize that the Queen was "subjected to the effects of her own inflamed, searing hot envy and hatred." It was also noted that this ending echoes the fairy tale of "The Red Shoes", which similarly "warns of the danger of attachment to appearances". Diane Purkiss attributes the Queen's fiery death in the Brothers Grimm tale to "the folk belief that burning a witch's body ended her power, a belief which subtended (but did not cause) the practice of burning witches in Germany." The American Folklore Society noted that the use of iron shoes "recalls folk practices of destroying a witch through the magic agency of iron." In other variants of the "Snow White" type tales, the story usually also ends with the punishment of the wicked stepmother through burning, immurement, or decapitation.

Rosemary Ellen Guiley suggests that the Queen of the Brothers Grimm tale uses an apple because it recalls the temptation of Eve; this creation story from the Bible led the Christian Church to view apples as a symbol of sin. Many people feared that apples could carry evil spirits and that witches used them for poisoning. Robert G. Brown of Duke University also makes a connection with the story of Adam and Eve, seeing the Queen as a representation of the archetype of Lilith. The symbol of the apple has long had traditional associations with enchantment and witchcraft in some European cultures, as in the case of Morgan le Fay's Avalon ("Isle of the Apples").

== Adaptations ==
The Queen is portrayed in a variety of ways in subsequent adaptations of the original fairy tale (considered "mutations" by Zipes). For one, she is usually provided a backstory that is often tragic, with motifs such as childhood trauma, which may humanise her and make her a less one-dimensional character. Lana Berkowitz of the Houston Chronicle noted: "Today stereotypes of the evil queen and innocent Snow White often are challenged. Rewrites may show the queen is reacting to extenuating circumstances." In addition, according to Scott Meslow of The Atlantic, "Disney's decision to throw out the Grimm's appropriately grim ending—which sentences the evil queen to dance in heated iron shoes until her death—has meant that ending is all but forgotten." However, this change was not unique to Disney: already in Taylor's 1923 German Popular Stories, the very first translation of the Grimms' tale into English, the Queen, while remaining just as much a sinister figure as in the original text, simply chokes to death out of anger (Taylor avoided giving cruel punishments for the villains throughout the book). She can also "be presented either as a horrible witch or as a beautiful and jealous rival", thus enhancing one of the themes of the story. The author James Ursini described her a "classic female icon for fetishists" of powerful and evil women.

=== Disney's Snow White franchise ===
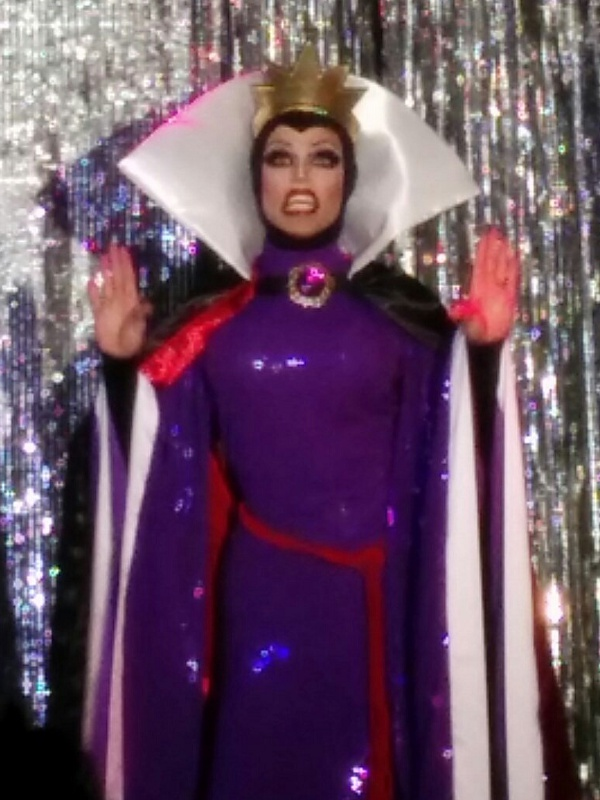
Morgan McMichaels dressed as the Evil Queen from a 1937 Showgirls Weho Performance

In The Walt Disney Company's seminal 1937 animated film Snow White and the Seven Dwarfs, the Queen, usually known as the Evil Queen or the Wicked Queen, is sometimes referred to as Queen Grimhilde in Disney publications from the 1930s and was originally voiced by Lucille La Verne. In the film, similar to the Brothers Grimm story, the Queen is vain and wants to be the "fairest in the land". She envies her stepdaughter's beauty and the attention of the Prince from another land. Disney's changes also include the expansion of her magical powers (including control over elements of nature, conjuring wind, and thunder as ingredients for her spell) and placing her as the master of the spirit in her magic mirror (even referred to by the Queen as her "slave"). As in the fairy tale, the Queen's jealousy leads her to plot Snow White's death, and leads to her own when she falls to her death shortly after poisoning Snow White. The Disney version of the Queen character uses her magic to transform herself into an old woman rather than taking a disguise like in the Grimms' story; with this appearance, she is commonly referred to as the Wicked Witch or alternatively as the Old Hag, or Witch.

The film's version of the Queen was created by Walt Disney and Joe Grant, originally animated by Art Babbit, overseen by David Hand, and voiced (in both of her forms) by Lucille La Verne. Inspiration for her design came from several sources, including the characters of Queen Hash-a-Motep from She and Princess Kriemhild from Die Nibelungen, as well as actresses such as Joan Crawford and Gale Sondergaard.

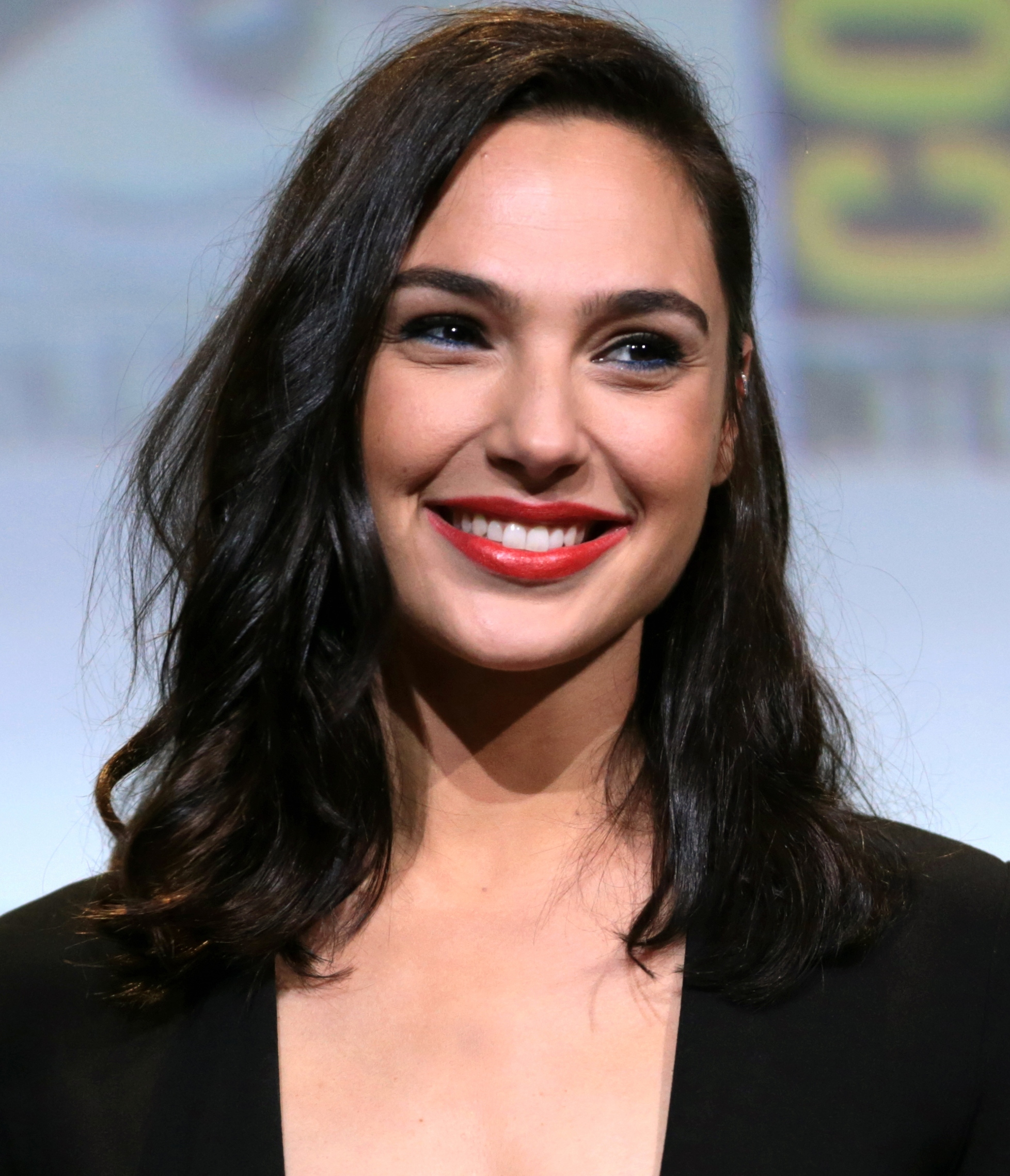
Gal Gadot at 2016 San Diego Comic-Con International

Since the 1937 film, the Wicked Queen has made numerous appearances in The Walt Disney Company productions and attractions, such as the show Fantasmic!, the book series The Kingdom Keepers, and the video game Kingdom Hearts Birth by Sleep, sometimes appearing alongside Maleficent from Sleeping Beauty. She has since been voiced by Eleanor Audley, Louise Chamis, and Susanne Blakeslee. She was portrayed live by Anne Francine, Jane Curtin, and Olivia Wilde, among others. Her surviving and aged version was portrayed by Kathy Najimy in Descendants. In 2025, Gal Gadot portrayed the Queen in Snow White, Disney's own and highly controversial (including major controversies surrounding her role) live-action reimagining of the original film.

According to Heather Greene, "Nearly a century later, the Wicked Queen in both of her forms reigns as one of Disney's most beautiful characters and one of the most frightening." She has become a popular archetype, visually embodying the fairy tale character in popular consciousness. She influenced a number of non-Disney "Snow White" adaptations and other works, and even Walt Disney's own next villainess, Maleficent. The both of them, along with Cruella De Vil, were later self-parodied by The Walt Disney Company through the character of Queen Narissa played by Susan Sarandon in Enchanted (2007).

=== Film and television ===
==== Live-action film ====
The 1916 American silent film Snow White is an early example of an altered ending to the story. Here, Queen Brangomar (Dorothy Cumming) is not executed but merely banished from the court after breaking her demonic mirror in anger.

Similarly, the 1961 East German film Snow White for the youngest viewers changes the ending as well, even as it an otherwise quite faithful adaptation. The Queen, played by Marianne Christina Schilling, arrives at Snow White's wedding where the Prince offers her a half of a red apple, which she assumes is poisoned, and flees terrified, chased out of the country by the Prince.

In the 1961 film Snow White and the Three Stooges, the Queen of Fortunia is played by Patricia Medina. Her character is similar to the fairy tale, however, the princess is protected by the Three Stooges. The Queen's companion in the film is the wizard Count Oga (a rare male magical villain of a "Snow White" story instead of a witch), who is killed by Prince Charming when he falls into a vat of boiling oil. Following the apple poisoning, the Stooges spot the Queen flying back to her castle on a broom and destroy her by using Oga's power to make a magic wish which causes her to fatally crash.

In the 1962 Mexican children's film, Tom Thumb and Little Red Riding Hood, Snow White's stepmother appears as the Witch Queen, Reina Bruja, the mistress of all evil and the queen of all monsters in the world, played by Ofelia Guilmáin. The Queen looks similar to the Queen in Disney's Snow White and the Seven Dwarfs but she has a green face like Maleficent from Disney's Sleeping Beauty. She dies when the Little Red Riding Hood tricks her to fall into a furnace-like shrine of the Devil at her castle.

The 1964 Korean film Princess Snow White (Baekseol Gongju), a new queen plotting to kill the first queen's daughter in a plot to seize undisputed power over an Asian kingdom. The film replaced the classic Western tale's rivalry over beauty with a political struggle for power in an allegory for South Korea's contemporary military coups.

The 1987 American musical film Snow White stars Diana Rigg as the Queen. The plot follows the story of the fairy tale closely but again modifies the ending. When the Queen is invited to Snow White's wedding, she breaks the mirror in rage, causing her to age rapidly. After arriving at the wedding, as the mirror falls apart, she shatters into pieces and disintegrates.

In the 1997 Gothic horror film Snow White: A Tale of Terror, exploring the wicked stepmother's backstory and personality as its "quasi-central" character in an antithesis to the Disney version. Here she is not a queen, but rather a tragic noblewoman named Lady Claudia Hoffman, portrayed by Sigourney Weaver. Unlike a usual Snow White stepmother character, she is explicitly obsessed with motherhood rather than her appearance. Lady Claudia, daughter of a witch (who the film suggests had been burned at the stake by the knights of the kingdom), marries widower Count Frederick and tries to befriend his daughter Lilli, who rejects her. When Claudia is pregnant, Lilli receiving all of the attention causes her so much stress that the baby is stillborn. Driven mad by grief Claudia listens to her mother's magic mirror and blames Lilli for the baby's death and shows her own reflection distorted and deformed, driving the countess to her crimes and possessing her. Claudia's various magic powers greatly surpass those of the Brothers Grimms Queen. She successfully seduces Lilly's suitor Dr Gutenberg and begins to plot the death of her stepdaughter and later also the king. Claudia sends her mute, inbred brother Gustav to kill the princess (his role replacing that of the Hunter from the fairy tale). When her mirror tells her that Lilli is alive, she uses magic to kill her brother and to try to bring her child back to life. Claudia learns of Lilly's whereabouts and attempts to kill her and the seven miners with whom Lilly hides. She then gives Lilli a poisoned apple, placing her in a coma. When Lilli awakens she and the remaining miners confront Claudia. Lilli kills her stepmother by stabbing her image in the mirror, causing Claudia to rapidly age and catch fire before she is crushed by debris.

Snow White: A Tale of Terror has been noted as innovative in that the Queen's jealousy is first provoked by Snow White's own jealousy towards her. Weaver said about her role: "It was vitally important to me to make it clear that Claudia and Frederick are madly in love at the beginning and that's what Lilli resents. Then when she changes from perfect wife into the worthless mother of a stillborn child, that's when she looks hideous in the mirror and blames Lilli for everything. The key to Claudia is that she starts out as normal as the rest of us. She isn't evil."

Willa: An American Snow White, a 1998 television reimagined version of the fairy tale takes place in the American South around 1915, featuring a retired stage star Regina Worthington (played by Caitlin O'Connell). Regina (Latin for "queen") is jealous of her stepdaughter, Willa, who has ambitions to become an actress and attempts to gain Regina's approval. The stepmother's mirror is not magic but a regular mirror in which she sees her young and beautiful image due to insanity. After Regina notices that Willa is more beautiful than her, she orders her butler Otto to kill Willa, but he drives Willa into a forest where she takes refuge with a traveling show. Regina murders Otto and attempts to murder Willa while the latter plays Snow White in a skit, but Willa is saved by the "elixir of life" of the fake Indian chief Wonka that the demented Regina drinks before accidentally setting fire to the stage and herself. Willa is subsequently cast in a moving picture while Tonka, who claims to have seen Regina perform, says that she was described as "the tragic queen" and that she serves as a cautionary tale against "the corrosive effects of fame and fortune." Regina's character is based not only on the Queen but also on Norma Desmond from Sunset Boulevard.

An inspired character is in the 1999 film The Queen of the Lake that mixes the fairy tales of Grimm and those of Hans Christian Andersen. The Queen plots to marry the young Prince Victor so she can become the most powerful ruler in the world, but Victor discovers the Queen has magically kidnapped seven young princesses so they could not become her rivals. He manages to rescue the princesses and defeat the Queen, turning her to stone.

In the 2001 American television film Snow White: The Fairest of Them All, a self-loathing crone genie named Elspeth (Miranda Richardson and Karin Konoval in her crone form) is transformed into a beautiful queen by her brother. She becomes jealous when her hall of mirrors reveal that her stepdaughter Snow White is the fairest in the land and in this adaptation she is driven more by insecurities than vanity. She also envies the affection that Prince Alfred shows towards Snow White and disguises herself as Snow White's deceased mother Josephine (Vera Farmiga) and succeeds in poisoning her with an apple. Eventually, Elspeth shatters the mirrors in rage, breaking her spells and turning her back into the old crone, and is then killed by the dwarves whom she had once turned into statues.

Nina Hagen portrayed the Queen in the 2004 German comedy film 7 Dwarves – Men Alone in the Wood and its 2006 sequel 7 Dwarves: The Forest Is Not Enough. In the latter, the Queen's character is known as the Witch after having been dethroned and the main villain is instead Rumpelstiltskin. It is a loose adaptation parody: for example, the poisoned apple scene is replaced by the one involving the Queen pretending to be a door-to-door salesperson of supposed youth-preserving coffins to trick Snow White, played by Nina Hagen's real life daughter, Cosma Shiva Hagen. The two live-action films were followed by 2014's animated film The Seventh Dwarf, in which her character was given the name Dellamorta. In it, she ends up accidentally defeated by the eponymous dwarf Bubi and turned into an ice figure.

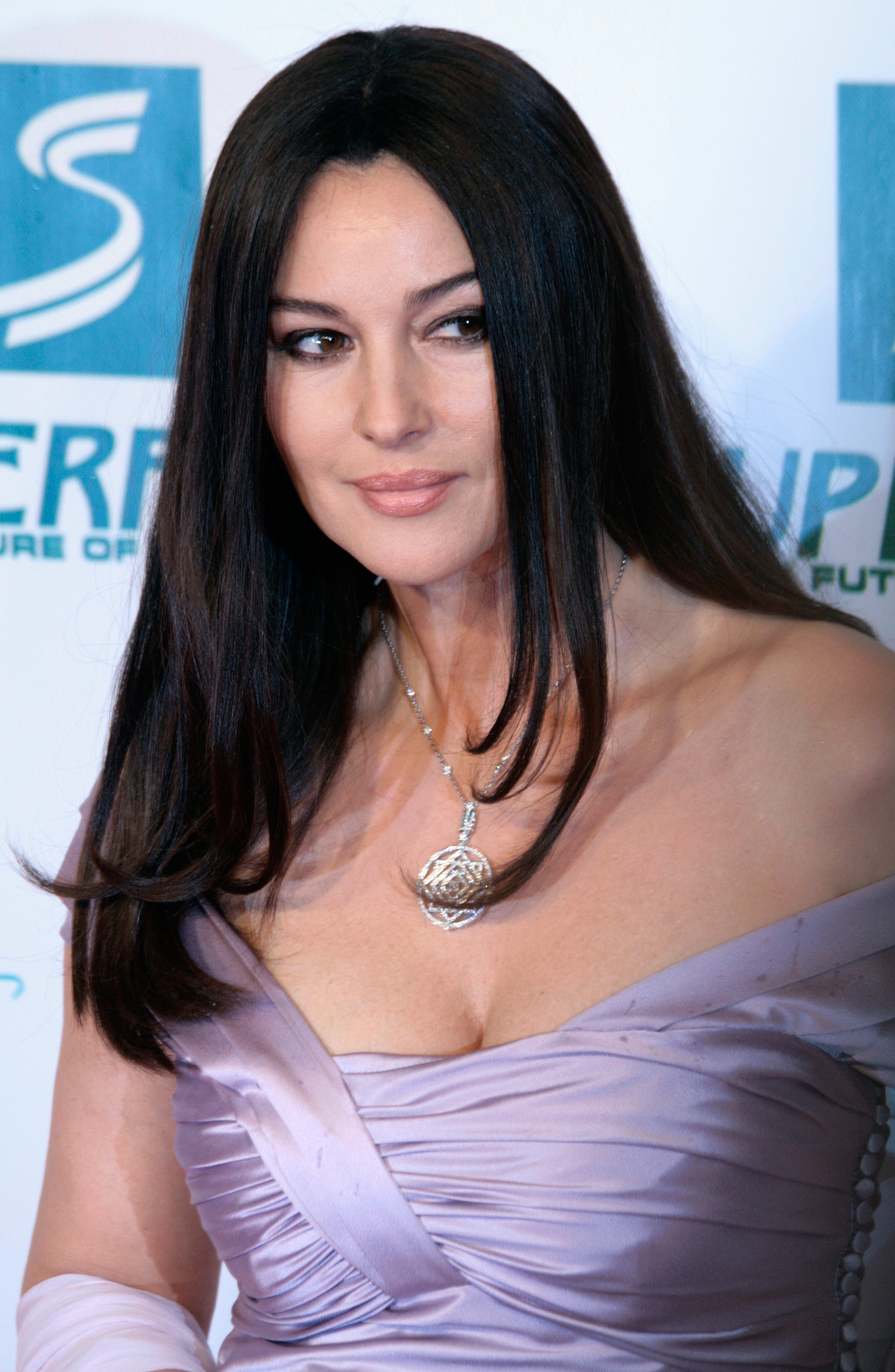
Monica Bellucci in 2009

In the 2005 historical fantasy film The Brothers Grimm, Monica Bellucci plays an Elizabeth Báthory-like figure that (in the film's world) will inspire both the fairytale Evil Queen and Rapunzel after the Brothers themselves face her in Napoleonic-era Germany. Known as the Thuringian Queen or the Mirror Queen, she is the extremely vain and dominatrix-like witch who is a former wife of an unnamed Christian king, obsessed with preserving her youth and beauty that is otherwise only preserved in an idealised form in her magic mirror. This leads her to dabble in black magic, which backfires when she acquires a spell for eternal life that does not grant her eternal youth. Since then, she has been living in a tower organising abductions of young girls so she can use their blood to regain her youth and beauty. Five hundred years later, in 1811, she is close to achieving her return and the conquest of Germany. The Queen's magic defeats an invading French forces and she herself attempts to seduce Will Grimm. She is destroyed after Jake Grimm shatters the mirror in the tower, making her werewolf minion transform into the woodsman (the film's Hunter figure) and destroy the rest of the mirror by jumping out of the tower's window with it. The story of The Brothers Grimm "reflects the political battle over the European hearts and minds between, on the one side, [French general] Delatombe's ideal of the supra-national state, which strives to make Italians and Germans into citizens of the French Revolution, and, on the other, the Thuringian queen's sub-national vision wishes to draw Germans into a native past which is fixated with notions of power and blood so dear to twentieth-century totalitarian ideologies."

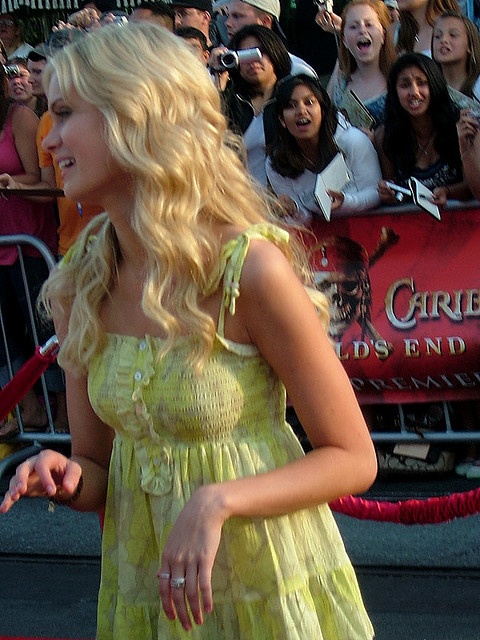
Sara Paxton in 2007

In the 2007 teen comedy film Sydney White, Sara Paxton plays Rachel Witchburn, the mean and rich (due to her family wealth) leader of the student council and the head of the Kappa Sorority that the working-class family newcomer Sydney wants to attend. Jealous of Sydney becoming more popular than she is (her computer and the internet replacing the magic mirror in the telling), Rachel hires a hacker to destroy Sydney's computer files using a virus called The Poison Apple. Nevertheless, Sydney, aided by outsiders and by seven male students including Rachel's ex-boyfriend Tyler Prince, wins the debate and the election, becoming the new president.

In a major 2012 retelling, Snow White and the Huntsman, Charlize Theron portrays Queen Ravenna, an extremely powerful sorceress on a misandrous vendetta after having been sexually abused by powerful men in the past. After the prologue that shows how she inherited her mother's magic, the Queen is depicted as a vain, scheming, and power-hungry secret leader of a supernatural army that King Magnus believes he "defeated" when "rescuing" her. On their wedding night, she brutally murders the King and everyone in the castle but the young Snow White, conquering yet another kingdom with her younger brother Finn. However, Ravenna fears that Snow White may challenge her reign of terror. The Queen's obsession with power and beauty stems from childhood trauma when her mother tells her that beauty is a weapon. The strength of her powers seems to correlate to her appearance, which she retains by stealing life force from young women. Both her powers and beauty begin to fade as Snow White comes into her own. Her magic mirror assures her that the only way to render her powers and her youth permanent is to consume Snow White's heart. She is ultimately killed when she is stabbed by Snow White, aided by Eric the Huntsman, rapidly aging as she dies.

Snow White and the Huntsman director Rupert Sanders said: "It was very important that we didn't have a terrible cut-out villain. We had someone who was doing evil things out of a fear and weakness. I think it is important that you do sympathize with her to a degree, but also really understand why she is the person she’s become because she wasn't born evil. It was a journey for her to become evil, and I think it was very important to myself and Charlize Theron to play a realistic version of the queen." Theron said about the character: "At first, I didn't really understand why she was evil or losing her mind, but once I understood that it wasn't just the fact that her mortality relied upon finding Snow White, and that knowing that and not being able to do anything and being stuck in a castle. Well, I think that would be maddening for somebody like her. It reminded me a lot of Jack Nicholson's character in The Shining—that idea that you're stuck in this place and you can't escape it, that cabin fever."

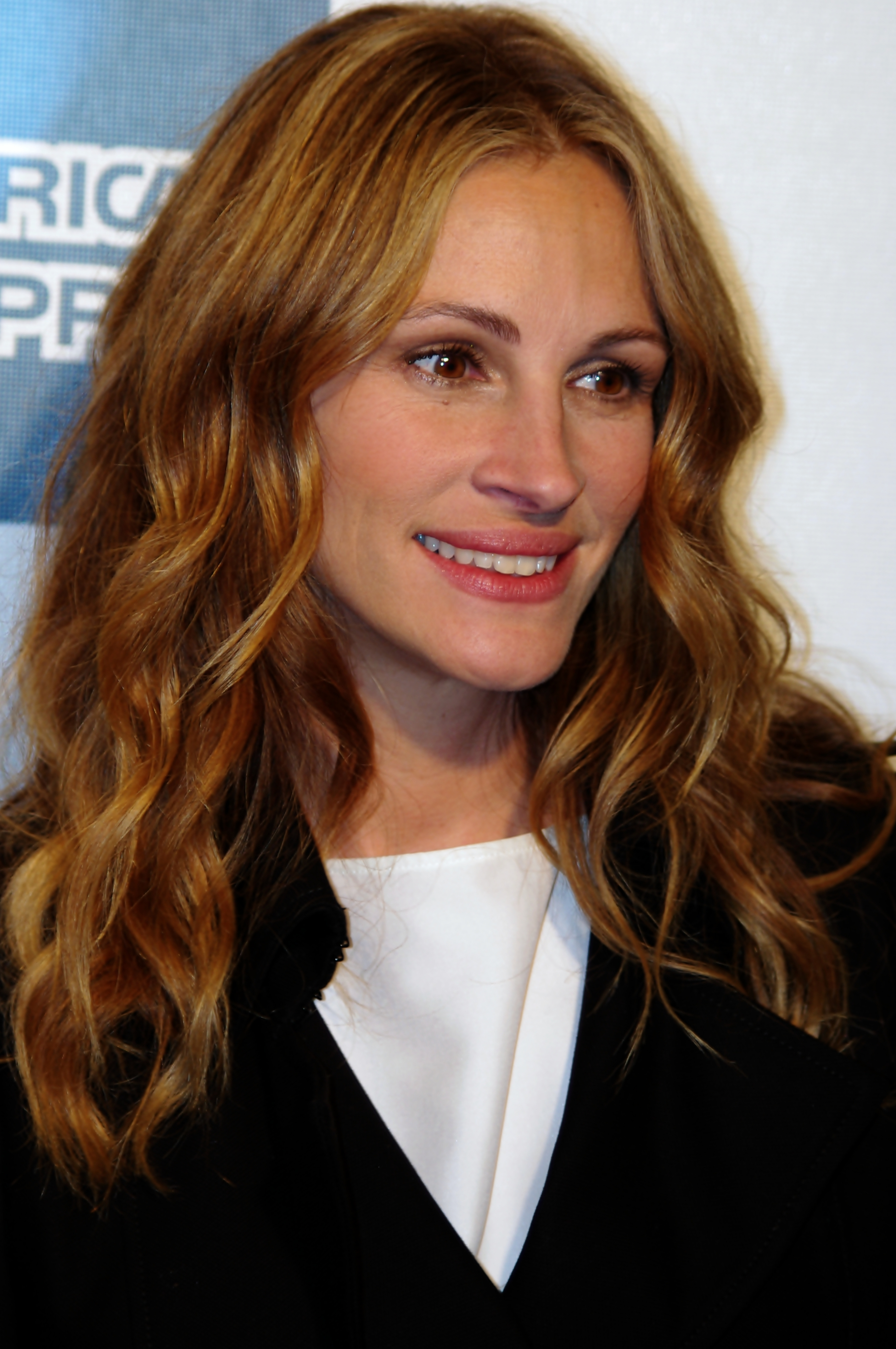
Julia Roberts in 2011

In the 2012 comedy fantasy film Mirror Mirror, Julia Roberts plays Queen Clementianna, a comical and sympathetic version of the character framing the film's plot through her ironic and cynical prologue and epilogue narration where she insists on presenting it as her story. She is a cold and narcissistic woman who married the king and bewitched him into a savage beast using a magic necklace. The Queen spends her time organizing lavish parties in the palace and buying expensive dresses while neglecting the kingdom which has caused the people to struggle and live in poverty due to high taxes imposed on them by her. She uses a magic mirror to talk to a much younger reflection of herself (played by Lisa Roberts Gillan) who often warns her not to use her magic for selfish short-sighted purposes. Such as using total control over their husband and Prince Alcott or turning her servant Brighton into a cockroach as punishment. In her attempts to kill her 18-year-old stepdaughter Snow White, the Queen creates two wooden puppets to attack the dwarves' home as well as commanding the Beast to attack. Once Snow defeats the beast, the Queen begins to rapidly age as her reflection states that she must pay the price for her use of magic. When Snow White then refuses the poisoned apple when offered by the crone-queen at her wedding, Clementianna herself eats it and dissolves, while the mirror portal shatters.

One character in Mirror Mirror calls Clementianna a "good old-fashioned, plain, traditional psycho crazy." Director Tarsem Singh explained that the mirror world is the Queen's own delusion: "She's just insecure ... about beauty, about things that are passing her by, and now she wants power. If she looks into the mirror ... she enters the landscape, which is a mindscape, and in there is a house, inside which are many mirrors, and in those mirrors she just talks to herself. So it's actually just her talking to herself. She's just bad, but wants to outsource the evil and say 'That thing told me'."

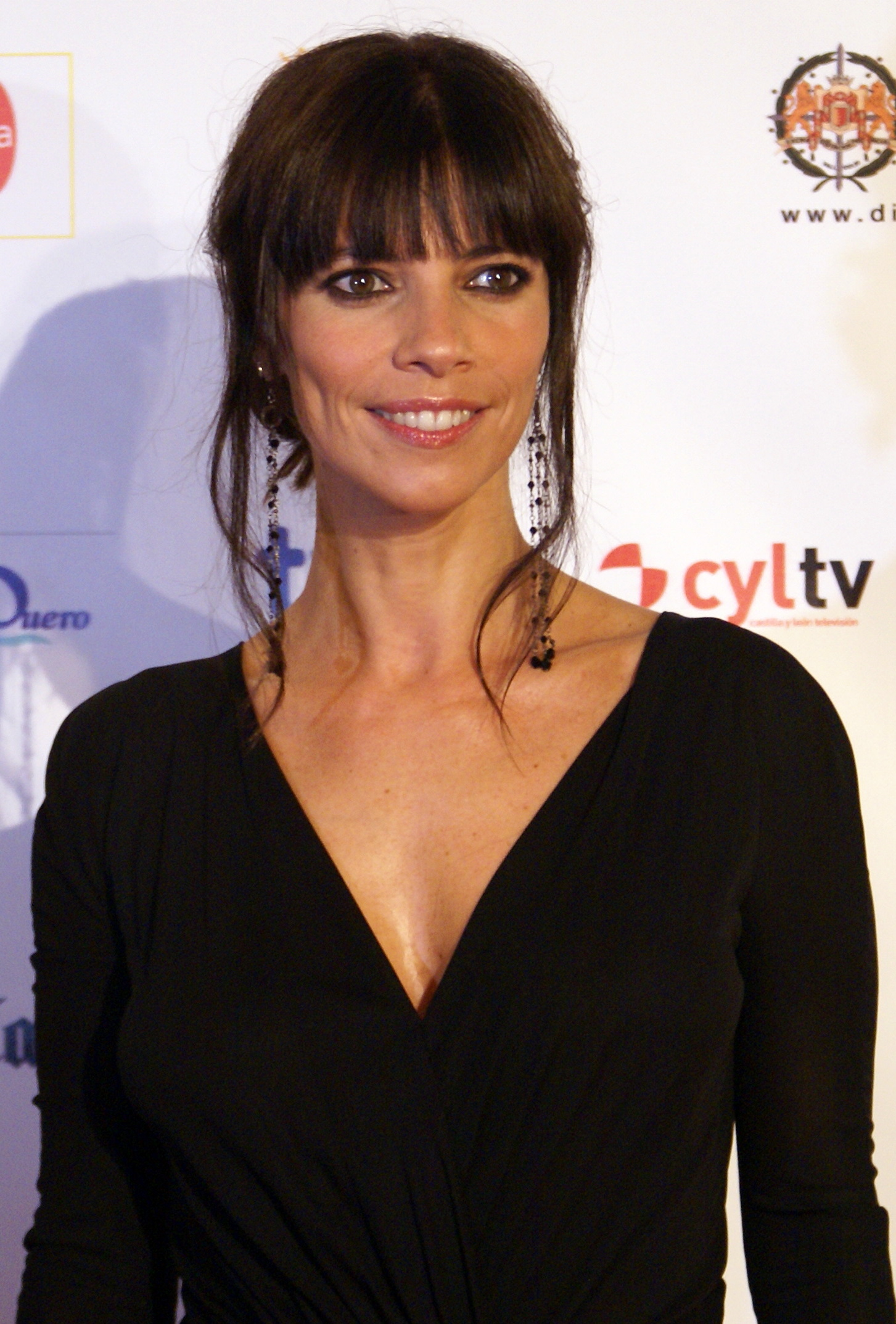
Maribel Verdú in 2011

Maribel Verdú plays Encarna, the evil stepmother of Carmen(cita) Villalta also known as Blancanieves (Snow White) in the 2012 Spanish "Gothic melodrama" silent art film Blancanieves that transplants the story to the 1920s Andalusia and strips it of any magic elements. The film's screenwriter and director Pablo Berger described her as the "worst stepmother in the history of cinema". After personally murdering her husband and her own lover, who did not kill Blancanieves, Encarna eventually poisons her at a bullfighting ring and is then herself killed by the dwarf bullfighters when they trap her with a raging bull. In Lilet Never Happened, also released in 2012, Snow White's witch-mother figure is represented by the Filipino woman who sold by her own daughter Lilet (who sees herself as Snow White and is called by this name) into a Manila child prostitution ring.

2012 also saw the release of multiple low-budget "blockbuster" Snow White films. In Grimm's Snow White, the evil queen's name is Queen Gwendolyn (played by Jane March). She plans to marry Prince Alexander, so she must kill her stepdaughter Snow White who loves him as well. When she attempts to forcibly marry Alexander, Snow White manages to break free and decapitate her before the ceremony can be finished. Snow White: A Deadly Summer is a modern-day re-imagining of the story as a slasher horror film where Maureen McCormick plays Eve, the psychopathic woman who wants Snow's father all for herself, and her own mirror image "told" her she needs eliminate her Snow to achieve this.

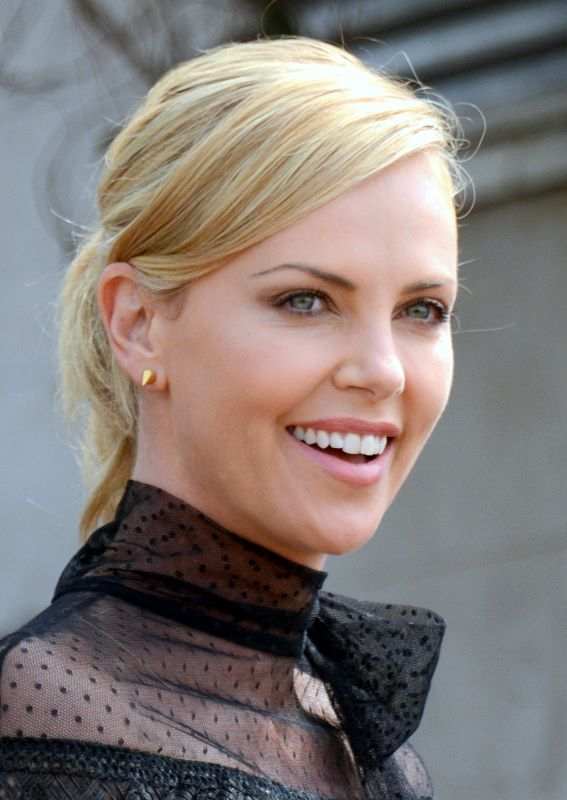
Charlize Theron in 2015

Theron reprised her role in the Snow White and the Huntsman sequel, The Huntsman: Winter's War (2016), in which the Queen was revealed to have hidden part of herself in the Mirror. Allowing her to be restored to life by her younger sister, the Snow Queen-like "ice princess" Freya. Freya learns that Ravenna had killed her child whom the Mirror said would grow up more beautiful than Ravenna. The sisters fatally duel each other, enabling Eric to break the Mirror as Ravenna shatters into pieces.

==== Live-action series ====
In the Snow White episode of the 1984 television series Faerie Tale Theatre, Vanessa Redgrave's Queen argues with the film's narrator about the plot. She is ultimately punished with a spell that drives her to insanity by preventing her from ever seeing her reflection again.

In the 1987-1988 television series The Charmings, a sequel to the fairy tale, Queen Lillian White, portrayed by Judy Parfitt, returns from a bottomless pit to cast a powerful curse on Snow White and her family. This curse banishes them all (including the Queen herself and her Magic Mirror) a thousand years into the future, where they live as the titular Charmings in the 20th-century Burbank, California. The Queen is forced to live with Snow White, while trying to return to their own world.

The main villain of the 2000 miniseries The 10th Kingdom is Christine White, more commonly referred to as the Evil Queen and portrayed by Dianne Wiest. Two hundred years after the events of the original Snow White fairy tale, the original Evil Queen, who had been left for death, uses her mirrors to spy on Earth, where she finds Christine Lewis, a troubled former socialite whose husband Tony lost their fortune through bad investments and whose daughter Virginia was unplanned. After almost killing her daughter in a psychotic break, Christine joins the Queen (now an undead hag known as the Swamp Witch) in the realm of the Nine Kingdoms to be groomed as an apprentice and to be her successor. Christine then inserts herself into the House of White, first as the nanny of Snow White's grandson, Prince Wendell White, and later as his stepmother. She's then imprisoned for the murder of Wendell's father. As The 10th Kingdom begins, she escapes to act as antagonist until her death by Virginia.

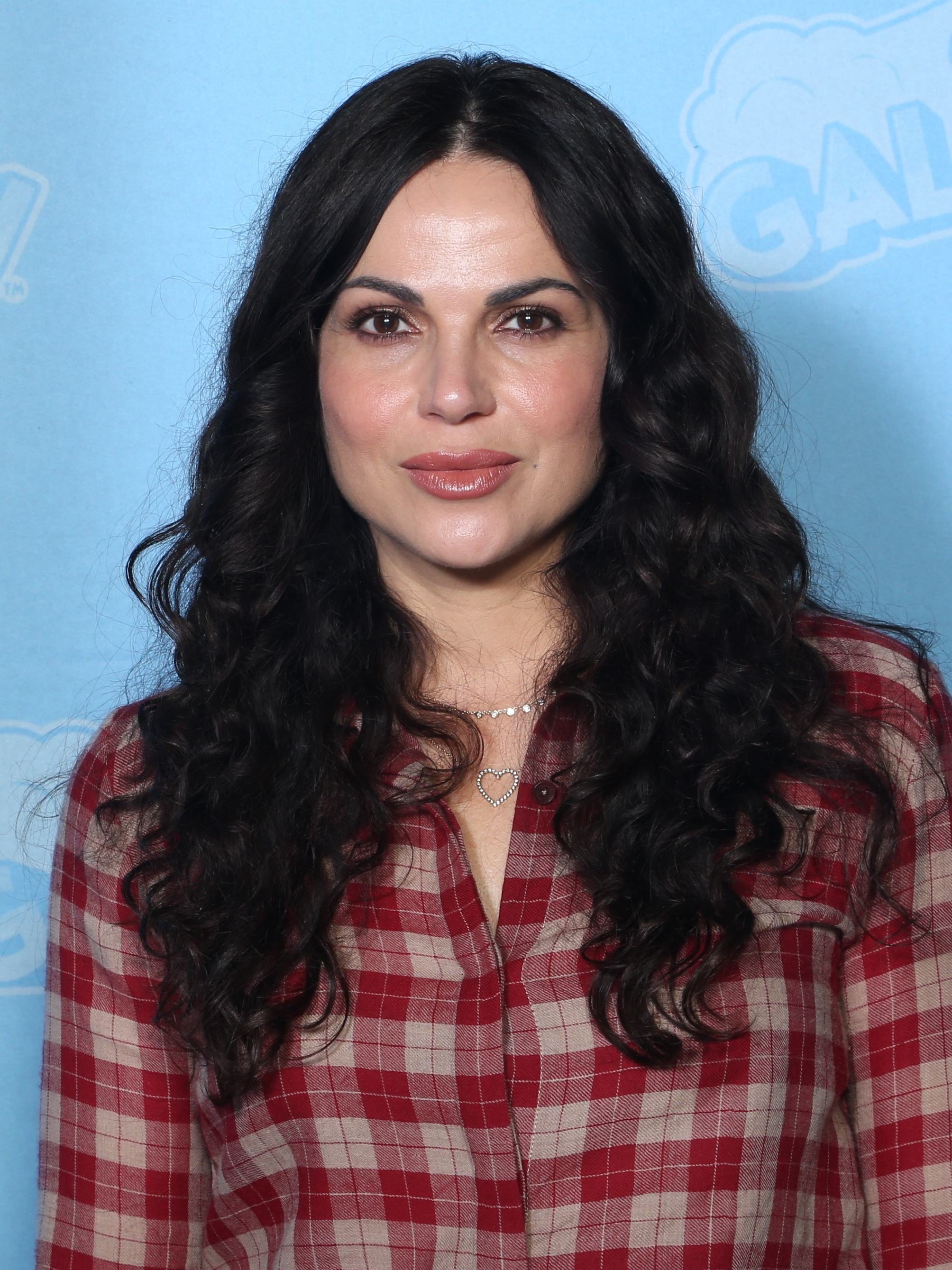
Lana Parrilla in 2022

In all seven seasons of the 2011–2017 American TV series Once Upon a Time, the Queen, also known as Regina Mills (the mayor of the modern-like town of Storybrooke, her creation) and portrayed by Lana Parrilla, transforms from an antagonist into a central character. Regina saves Snow White's life when they are younger, leading to Regina's unwilling marriage to Snow's father. When Snow inadvertently causes the death of Regina's true love, Regina grows vengeful and becomes the Evil Queen. After years of failing to kill Snow White, the Evil Queen eventually casts the Dark Curse, provided by her mentor Rumpelstiltskin, sending all the fairytale characters to the real world and erasing their true memories. During the curse, Regina adopts a son, Henry. Later, Regina's curse is broken by Snow White's daughter, Emma (Henry's biological mother), and Regina decides to try and redeem herself for her son. In time, Regina manages to make amends with Snow White, Emma, and her other enemies. She also meets her long-lost half-sister, Zelena the Wicked Witch, and falls in love with Robin Hood. In the fifth season, following Robin's death, Regina uses Dr. Jekyll's serum to separate herself from the darkness within her, creating the Evil Queen as a separate individual. In the seventh season, set many years later, Regina is crowned the Good Queen when the realms are united. Regina's character had been shaped by the toxic influence of her literally-heartless witch mother Cora, herself a major character in the show, through a generational cycle of youthful trauma (the cause of Cora's own evilness to begin with).

==== Animation ====
An early yet notable animated adaptation is Snow-White (1933), a Betty Boop series cartoon short in which the Queen is a vain and conniving witch who resembles Olive Oyl. When she is defeated, her mirror explodes in a puff of magic smoke that changes her into a hideous dragon that chases the protagonists until the Queen's own former guard grabs the dragon's tongue and turns her inside out, revealing her skeleton.

Another early American animation, Coal Black and de Sebben Dwarfs (1943), is a controversial World War II propaganda short that reimagines all the story's characters as African-Americans. The "mean ol' queen" of the story (voiced by Ruby Dandridge and Danny Webb), a parody of the Disney character, plots to murder "So White" out of jealousy for the handsome "Prince Chawmin," representing food hoarders at the time of war rationing.

In the 1960 series Popeye the Sailor, the episode Olive Drab and the Seven SweaPeas has the Sea Hag as the Evil Queen responsible for stealing the gold from the king's boat, and it is up to Princess Olive to find it. The Sea Hag plans to put the princess to sleep with a can of cursed spinach, but Prince Popeye discovers her plan and easily defeats her.

The Wicked Queen is voiced by Melendy Britt in the 1980 Filmation animated television film A Snow White Christmas, a loose sequel set years after the events of the fairy tale in which the long defeated Queen is accidentally revived after having been enclosed in ice for many years. Determined to get rid of the now ruling Queen Snow White and King Charming, as well as their teenage daughter (who is also named Snow White), the Queen freezes the entire kingdom. The young princess escapes and enlists the help of the seven friendly giants. Each time, the Queen's attempts to harm the second Snow White with her evil magic are foiled by the new protectors of the princess. Eventually, the Queen resorts to disguise herself as an old giant woman to trick Snow White into smelling the scent of a poisoned flower. Having found Snow White dead, the enraged giants seek revenge and attack the Queen's castle. While they are fighting her demon minions, the magic mirror rebels against the Queen and destroys her once and for all. With the Queen's final demise, her spells are broken and all of her victims return to life.

In the "Snow White" episode of the 1987 anime series Grimm's Fairy Tale Classics, an arguably "subtly feminist" retelling of the original stories, the Queen's plots involve first the Huntsman and then the lace, but the later attempt involving the poison apple and a magical disguise is enabled by an old witch serving her. After Snow White eats the apple, the Queen leaves the Seven Dwarfs' house and is attacked by Snow White's friend Klaus and the Prince, fighting them off until many many wolves come to their aid, and the narrator recounts that the Queen fought "like a lioness" until they finally killed her.

Another Filmation production, Happily Ever After, came out in 1990 as in unofficial sequel to the Disney film. In it, the late Queen's brother, the equally evil wizard Lord Maliss, arrives in the kingdom to avenge his sister on those responsible for her demise: Snow White and Prince Charming, abducting the latter just as they are about to marry. Due to pressure by Disney lawyers, the Queen herself does not appear in person and is only shown via a portrait and a bust statue. The film begins with her monster minions partying and celebrating her death, and Lord Maliss is eventually destroyed after being turned into a stone statue.

The 1991 Australian animated film The Magic Riddle combines the story of Snow White with several other fairy tales in which the villain is generically known as The Widow (Robyn Moore). She plans to marry her biological daughter, Bertha, to the handsome young Phillipe, but he is in love with her stepdaughter Cindy (a figure combing Snow White with Cinderella) who is aided by her grandmother. Following the advice of her magic mirror, the stepmother disguises herself as a salesman and visits the grandmother in the woods, tricking her into entering a castle where she becomes trapped inside it. Later, Phillipe and the Dwarfs find themselves confined in the castle as well. The stepmother, wearing another disguise devised by her magic mirror, hypnotises Cindy with a magic apple to fall asleep, but accidentally falls into a well during the commotion. Eventually, Cindy and Phillipe's wedding is held at what used to be her stepmother's house, where she and her daughter are to serve as maids just as Cindy used to.

In the 1994-1995 anime television series The Legend of Snow White, Lady Crystal (クリスタル, sometimes misspelled as "Chrystal"; voiced by Mari Yooko), a ruler of a neighboring kingdom famed for her beauty, comes to marry King Conrad. As in the fairy tale, she turns out to be an evil and jealous woman who uses witchcraft to eliminate her rivals and obtain what she desires most: beauty and power. The series vastly expands the story to fill its 52 episodes. After the king leaves to war, Queen Crystal, aided by her bat familiar, attempts to kill Snow White, but the princess ends up in the care of the Seven Dwarfs. Crystal then tries to take the life of Snow White several times, including with a cursed comb while in the guise of an orphan girl Marie. During the final attempt, she instead uses an apple to put her rival in an enchanted sleep in order to take over her youthful body for her own. Eventually, the Queen turns out to be an unknowing puppet of the demon in her mirror. Snow White's fiancé Prince Richard manages to kill Helene in a desperate fight, saving not only his beloved but also saving Crystal from the evil influence.

In the 2007 animated film Shrek the Third, the Evil Queen she (voiced by Susanne Blakeslee, later the voice actresses of the Disney's Evil Queen in Kingdom Hearts: Birth by Sleep) is a minor antagonist recruiter by the villain of Prince Charming to help him take over Far Far Away, but redeems herself by the end, making amends with her stepdaughter and saying she always wanted to start a spa in France. She also appears in the Shrek the Third video game where Shrek and Pus have to fight their way through her castle in a game-exclusive scenario.

In the 2008 animated film Bratz Kidz Fairy Tales, the Wicked Queen (voiced by Marcy Goldberg) plots to get rid of Snow White (Jade) to become the fairest in the land. She teams up with the witch from Rapunzel to have the Big Bad Wolf eat the girls. But when the Queen and the Wolf end up lost in the woods, the Wolf, having grown hungry, eats her instead.

In the 2009 animated film Happily N'Ever After 2: Snow White—Another Bite @ the Apple, Cindy Robinson voices the would-be Queen, Lady Vain, who is aided by Rumpelstiltskin and plots to seduce King Cole in order to rule the kingdom herself. Wanting Snow White removed from the kingdom, she uses magic to turn everyone in the kingdom against her. Nevertheless, Snow White manages to foil Lady Vain's marriage ceremony and expose her as a witch.

In the episode "Four Great Women and a Manicure" (2009) of the animated series The Simpsons, Lisa Simpson tells her version of the tale of "Snow White", with Lindsey Naegle in the role of the Queen. As in the classic story, the Queen asks the Huntsman (Groundskeeper Willie) to kill Snow White (Lisa), and later disguises herself as an old woman after discovering that she is still alive in order to poison her with the apple. After succeeding, she meets the dwarves, and flees from them through the window, encountering the forest animals outside, who end up devouring her.

Gina Gershon voiced Queen Regina in the English version of the 2019 Korean animated film Red Shoes and the Seven Dwarfs. In it, she is brought to King White's castle accused of being a witch for punishment, but the king falls in love with her. After Regina marries King White and becomes the new queen, people begin to disappear. The king finds out that she is indeed an evil witch and sends Snow White away to safety and to bring help, before Regina comes for him. When Snow White steals the red shoes that grant immortality and youth to Regina and escapes the castle, the witch tries to find her using the Magic Mirror and her ally Prince Average. Eventually, she hunts down Snow White in the woods, disguises herself as the young Merlin, takes Snow White back to the castle, and uses a magic apple to turns her into a magic tree. However, the real Merlin comes to the rescue as he kills the Queen with his magic and restores both the princess to her human form. The antagonist of the 2021 (now discontinued) mobile game sequel Red Shoes: Wood Bear World was Regina's sister, also an evil witch.

=== Literature ===
==== Long-form ====
The Evil Queen's character has been given various names and characterisations by modern authors. In Adèle Geras' Snow White retelling Pictures of the Night (1992), for instance, the protagonist is plagued by a series of mysterious accidents that she believes are being caused by her jealous, malevolent stepmother Marjorie. In Laurence Anholt's children's book Snow White and the Seven Aliens (1998), the jealous Mean Queen is a former famous pop star who was the lead singer of The Wonderful Wicked Witches. In Black as Night (2004), Regina Doman's adolescent novel set in modern New York City, Elaine is an egocentric stepmother to Bear (the prince figure) rather than Blanche (Snow White). In My Fair Godmother (2009), a romantic comedy novel by Janette Rallison, the evil queen is named Queen Neferia. In Sarah Pinborough's novel Charm (2013), the evil witch queen Lilith awakens Snow White from her glass coffin with a kiss. In Jane Yolen's Snow in Summer: Fairest of Them All (2011), the Queen is a dark magic-using stepmother simply called Stepmama. In Louise Simonson's Snow White and the Seven Robots: A Graphic Novel (2015), the Queen exiles the child genius scientist Snow White "so she cannot grow up and take the Queen's place as the most intelligent person on the planet." Danielle Paige's Stealing Snow (2016) features an evil king instead of a traditional queen figure. In Melissa Bashardoust's revisionist novel Girls Made of Snow and Glass (2017), a secretly loving relationship between Mina (the Snow Queen) with her stepdaughter Lynet (Snow White) saves them both.

In Tanith Lee's and Terri Windling's White as Snow (2000), mixing "Snow White" with the tragic myth of Demeter and Persephone, the queen figures's name is Arpazia. She is a mad princess who wants to rid of her rape-daughter Coira, eventually leading to her own death caused by a bastard son of her rapist (an enemy king and cult leader) and a cryptic (and possibly apocalyptic) ending. The story was noted by Jack Zipes for its darkness, violence, cynicism, and immorality of all characters.

Gregory Maguire's 2003 historical novel Mirror Mirror reinvents the fairy tale by casting the historical figure of Lucrezia Borgia in the role of Evil Queen. Bianca de Nevada (Snow White) is born as a child of a minor noble Vicente de Nevada in the 15th-century Renaissance Italy. After her father is forced to embark on a quest for a magical apple tree by Cesare Borgia, Bianca is left in the care of the beautiful and vain Lucrezia who becomes jealous of her lecherous brother Cesare's interest in the growing child. The seven dwarves are the creators of the quicksilver mirror, which makes the ruthless Lucrezia increasingly paranoid and insane.

In Mette Ivie Harrison's novel Mira, Mirror (2004), the titular Mirra was a young apprentice witch who was enchanted by her elder sister and a fellow apprentice Amanda into a magic mirror so Amanda could transform herself into the most beautiful woman in the world. Amanda becomes a Queen, but later mysteriously disappears, while the story of Mirra continues.

In Gail Carson Levine's novel Fairest (2006), Queen Ivi is an insecure 19-year-old new queen assisted by Skulni, the mysterious, evil creature living in Ivi's magic mirror. The cold-hearted and power-hungry Ivi blackmails the protagonist Aza, an ugly 15-year-old girl, into becoming her singing voice in order to preserve her own reputation, and later plots Aza's death, who saves herself by becoming beautiful when she uses Ivi's potion on herself. Eventually, it turns out that Ivi's actions have been manipulated by Skulni. Saved by Aza from being trapped in the mirror, Ivi turns away from her evil ways, loses her magically created beauty, and is sent away by the king to a remote castle.

In Jim C. Hines's Princesses series (2009–2011) chronicling the adventures of Snow White, Princess Danielle Whiteshore (Cinderella), and former Princess Talia Malak-el-Dahshat (Sleeping Beauty), Snow White's mother, Queen Rose Gertrude Curtana of Alessandria, was a powerful and cruel witch who trained her daughter in magic to later attempt transferring her soul into her daughter's body, but was thwarted when Snow White proved to be more capable than she had revealed. Snow was banished from her kingdom for the crime of killing her mother. Rose was tortured to death by having her feet burned by the dwarves, here elemental spirits that Snow can summon for aid at the cost of losing seven years of her life as 'payment' for their services, before they killed her. In The Stepsister Scheme, Rose is returned to life when her ghost is summoned by Danielle's stepsisters (believing her to be their now-deceased mother), possessing the elder sister Stacia to acquire a new body for herself, but she is finally defeated when the three princesses confront her with the aid of the seven dwarves. The fourth novel, The Snow Queen's Shadow, merging the tales od Snow White and Snow Queen, reveals that her magic mirror was created by her imprisoning a demon and binding it to her service, suggesting that the mirror's role in the original story was motivated by the demon attempting to create a set of circumstances that would allow it to escape, with the protagonists returning to Rose's former castle to rediscover the secrets she used to bind the demon in hopes of exorcising it after it possesses Snow White.

P. W. Catanese's novel The Mirror's Tale (2010) in the series Further Tales Adventures is a sequel to the fairy tale, taking place in the former castle of Rohesia a hundred years later. Before she went mad and became known as the Witch-Queen, Rohesia had been using her magic for healing. Her fate is unclear and mysterious, but her ghost does shows up to heal a poisoned character.

In Tom Holt's parody Snow White and the Seven Samurai (2010), the wicked queen's magic mirror is run by an operating system, which, when hacked, crashes so disastrously that not only the queen's plot against Snow White is foiled but all sorts of stories get tangled. In the main storyline, Snow White becomes vicious and hires the titular seven samurai to murder the queen, who is protected by the dwarfs and some other characters and is trying to restore the system.

In the children's book trilogy Hald Upon a Time by James Riley (2010–2013), a girl from the real world, sets out to rescue grandmother, who the protagonists believe is Snow White. She is soon revealed as the Wicked Queen and the true antagonist of the series.

The antagonist of Marissa Meyer's The Lunar Chronicles (2012–2015), Queen Levana, is the ruler of the moon, aunt of the protagonist Cinder, and stepmother of Princess Winter. Severely scarred from childhood burns, she either wears a veil or uses her psychic abilities to glamour herself with extreme beauty to ask her disfigurement while desperately desiring to be loved, which she can only achieve by magic means. Fairest, a prequel novella, focuses on her backstory.

In The Wishing Spell (2012), a children's novel in Chris Colfer's series The Land of Stories, the Evil Queen has bee spared by Snow White. She escapes her imprisonment, recovers her magic mirror and reunites with the Huntsman at a remote castle. The Queen desires to complete the Wishing Spell and seeks and sends her new Huntress (the original Hunter's daughter) to collect the ingredients for it. She captures the protagonists Conner and Alex, and reveals to them her tragic story. Her real name was Evly and she was once engaged to a man named Mira. When Evly refused to serve an evil enchantress, Mira was cursed to be trapped inside a mirror. Evly killed the enchantress but could not break the curse. She had also her heart cut off and turning it to stone, so she could only feel emotion when she was holding it. Evly then stole the throne, killing Snow White's mother and marrying the King, but Mira's condition began to deteriorate until he became a bland reflection as he became enamored with Snow White rather than the Queen. Using the Wishing Spell, the Queen manages to free Mira, but he is no longer capable of living outside the mirror and dies in her arms, and they both are consumed by the mirror which then shatters. It is later revealed that Snow White herself had let her escape the dungeon, knowing the Queen's story. In the sequel, The Enchantress Returns (2015), Conner and Alex manage to restore the mirror and contact Evly, but find out that she has become insane and the mirror's curse is in process of taking over her soul completely, just as it did with Mira.

Helen Oyeyemi's novel Boy, Snow, Bird (2014) is a rendition of "Snow White" set in 1950s New England. Oyeyemi said she wrote a wicked stepmother story because she "wanted to rescue the wicked queen from Snow White, because she seemed to find being a villain a bit of a hassle in a lot of ways. She wasn’t very efficient – it took her three tries to kill Snow White, for example. And I had read Barbara Comyns' The Juniper Tree, which is a retelling of the fairy tale from the perspective of the wicked stepmother, as well, so I began to see a way that I could do it for myself."

Donna Jo Napoli's historical fiction novel Dark Shimmer (2015) reimagines "Snow White" in medieval Venice, focused on the backstory of the Evil Queen figure. Dolce is an innocent, kind woman who grew up thinking she was hideous. Her mood swings and attempts to murder her beloved teenage stepdaughter are the result of mercury poisoning from her past work as an apprentice mirror maker, transforming her into "The Wicked One". The book's point of view shifts between Dolce and her stepdaughter Bianca.

C. J. Redwine's retelling The Shadow Queen (2016) features Queen Irina as an usurper draining life force from not only people but the land itself, reminiscent of Snow White and the Huntsman. Both works are also similar in some other aspects, such not featuring a traditional mirror and their evil queens commanding armies of soldiers made of shard of glass or ice.

Gena Showalter's The Evil Queen (2019), features Everly Morrow, a high school girl obsessed with mirrors who learns that she is prophesied to become the eponymous character in another world of the fairytale realm of Enchantia and tries to avert her destiny. The story continues in the Forest of Good and Evil series.

==== Short-form ====
The Queen has been featured in many short stories. In the "Snow White" chapter of Merseyside Fairy Story Collective's (edited by Jack Zipes) Don't Bet on the Prince: Contemporary Feminist Fairy Tales in North America and England (1986), the evil queen is ousted by popular revolution. Priscilla Galloway's collection of short stories Truly Grim Tales (1999) includes a version of "Snow White" told from the wicked stepmother's point of view. In the erotic short story "Gold, on Snow", published by Alison Tyler in Alison's Wonderland (2010), the jealous Queen spies on her stepdaughter in the house of the dwarves.

Robert Coover's satirical erotic short story "The Dead Queen" (1973) re-tells the fairy tale from the perspective of the Prince, deeply disappointed with Snow White and her creepy sexual relationship with the dwarves. At the Queen's funeral after her fiery execution, as she is buried in Snow White's former glass coffin, he suddenly realized that the Queen had loved him and had died for him. In desperation, he attempts bring her back to life by kissing her mutilated corpse, but in vain.

In the titular story "Red as Blood" from Tanith Lee's 1983 collection "Red as Blood, or Tales from the Sisters Grimmer", the Witch Queen is trying to stop the real villain, her stepdaughter Bianca, who is actually a vampire. Lee reimagined the tale of Snow White again in "Snow-Drop" (1993), a story set in modern times where a circus performer murders a younger rival.

Mexican author Carmen Boullosa's short story "Blancanieves" (1992) explores the concept of female sexuality, focusing on the relationship between the Queen and the forester (the hunter), and the 'love' triangle between the two and Blancanieves (Snow White). In it, the sexually aggressive Queen dominates the Huntsman, who, within his narrative, blames his sexual weakness on the magic potion that he was forced to drink.

In Neil Gaiman's "Snow, Glass, Apples" (1994), resembling Lee's revisionist treatment of the tale in "Red as Blood", in the Queen (serving as its narrator) is a tragic hero protagonist who struggles desperately to save the kingdom from her secretly vampiric and serial killer stepdaughter with demonic powers. The Queen fails in her plot to rid of Snow White after first having tried to befriend her. At the end of the story, it all turns out to be a recollection by the Queen as she is roasted alive inside an enormous kiln on the orders by Snow White and the Prince.

James Finn Garner included another satirical take on "Snow White" in his collection Politically Correct Bedtime Stories (1994) in which the Queen accidentally bonds with Snow White during the apple scene. Forgetting that the apple in question was poisoned, she shares it with Snow White and both fall comatose to the floor. When the dwarfs discover this, they decide to sell Snow White to the Prince so he can have sex with her. However, when they try to move the two women's bodies, they break the spell and the women awaken, angry and disgusted at what they overheard. The Queen then declares that the dwarfs are trespassers, throwing them out of her forest, and she and Snow White later open a spa for women on the same spot.

"Snow Night", a short story published in Barbara G. Walker's Feminist Fairy Tales (1996), the King's master of the hunt tries to incite jealousy in the Queen towards her stepdaughter after having been rejected by Snow Night. However, the Queen laughs off her magic mirror's answer, claiming that people go through cycles and that it is impossible to challenge the will of nature. The story suggests that the traditional version of the tale was actually invented by the exiled and crazed huntsman, now imprisoned in a distant country. In the preface, Walker wrote: "Snow White's stepmother seems to have been vilified because (a) she resented being less beautiful than Snow White, and (b) she practiced witchcraft. One might suspect that female beauty was really a larger issue for men than for women, because male sexual response depends to a considerable degree on visual clues. ... A queen who was also a witch would have been a formidable figure, adding political influence to spiritual mana. Snow White's stepmother therefore seems to me a projection of male jealousies. As re-envisioned in this story, she may seem more true to life."

"The Tale of the Apple" in Emma Donoghue's collection Kissing the Witch: Old Tales in New Skins (1997) has the Queen who awakens Snow White from her slumber because she yields to her desire for the princess. The preceding antagonism between them had been inadvertently caused by her husband.

"The True Story", a revisionist short story by Pat Murphy, published in the collection Black Swan, White Raven (1998), tells a story of a queen who sent her daughter away to avoid the incestuous advances of her pedophiliac and abusive husband, the King. The princess is cared for by seven witches in the forest, and when the king dies, she is brought back to rule the kingdom in her own right, instead of at the side of a prince.

==== Comics ====
In the DC Universe, the Queen of Fables is a scheming, villainous witch who, in her youth, wrought hell on earth until she was trapped in a book by her own stepdaughter, Snow White. Centuries later, she was freed accidentally by Snow White's descendants and has since faced many Justice League superheroes like Superman and Wonder Woman, who the Queen thought was Snow White due to her great beauty.

In the long-running Italian erotic comic series Biancaneve (1972–1986), the beautiful but evil witch Queen Naga (later just Naga) is the recurring main antagonist, loosely inspired by the Disney character. She is initially married to Kurt, the king of Kurtlandia and Snow White's father. Eventually, Naga and Snow White reconcile and even briefly marry (issues 34–35).

Kazuki Nakashima's manga series Lost Seven (2009, originally published in a play form in 1999 and filmed as a theatrical performance that same year) features Queen Rose, also known as The Witch of the Mirror, as a former court magician who usurped the throne and killed all members of the royal family except for Snow White, who managed to escape. She also seems to plan to open a portal to the demon realm through a magic mirror, here called Sefirot Glass and crafted by Snow White's own family. Queen Rose is killed by seven warriors trying to restore the Snow Queen to the throne, but as the castle crumbles she manages to rescue her own young child, Red Rose (Lady Rose), who ten years later becomes the teenage (anti)heroine of the series.

In Bill Willingham's comic book series Fables (2002–2015), the mother of the protagonist Snow White's and her sister Rose Red is the witch Lauda, the sole survivor of her 12 sisters who all killed each other in her youth due to a curse (Lauda herself killed the final sister). When she is ordered to kill Snow by the King, she fakes her daughter's death and arranges for her to live with Lauda's sister-in-law (who has killed her brother), the widowed Queen of the Silver Realm, a distant land (Snow's mother helped her to achieve this position) who speaks with Lauda through an enchanted mirror. Years later, her aunt is enraged by the fact that Snow is lovelier than her and decides to kill her herself in a manner similar to the fairy tale (first ordering the hunter and then delivering a poisoned apple).

In the four-part comic book series Muppet Snow White (2010) of The Muppets franchise, Miss Piggy takes the role of the Evil Queen in the story.

=== Other works ===
Marius Petipa and Arseny Koreshchenko's 1903 ballet The Magic Mirror, melds the Brothers Grimm tale with the Russian variant The Tale of the Dead Princess and the Seven Knights, which features no magic elements. After the evil deeds of the envious Queen (originally played by Marius Petipa's daughter Marie Petipa) against the Princess are exposed and the King threatens her with imprisonment, she has an attack of insanity, admits what she ordered be done and falls dead.

In Robert Walser's 1904 opera Schneewittchen (and João César Monteiro's 2000 film Branca de Neve based on it), the fairy tale is subverted. The story begins when adolescent, weak Prince revives Snow White, but instead of marrying her, he falls in love with her mother (not stepmother here), the beautiful Queen. The Prince is led to believe the villain responsible for the apple poisoning is the Huntsman, who too is the Queen's lover, while the King is oblivious of everything. The story centers on the conflict between the Queen and Snow White, and ends when the two make peace at last, and conspire to convince the King that he is not being cuckolded.

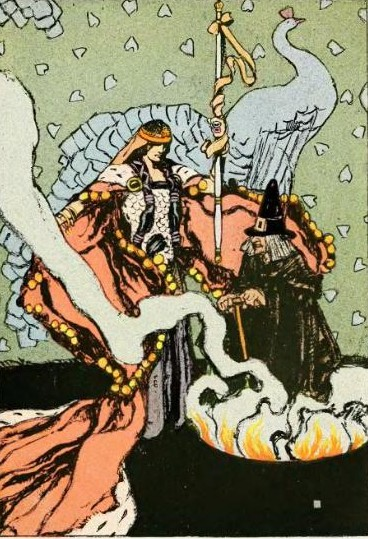
Queen Brangomar and Witch Hex in an illustration for Snow White and the Seven Dwarfs

In the 1912 play Snow White and the Seven Dwarfs, written by "Jessie Graham White" (Winthrop Ames), Queen Brangomar is jealous of Prince Florimond's love of Snow White. Brangomar summons Witch Hex (Hexy), a powerful godmother. In the end, Snow White forgives the Queen and, despite objections from the hunter (Berthold) who wants Brangomar dead, lets her go away unharmed. In the play's 1916 cinematic adaptation, the silent film Snow White, Queen Brangomar (played by Dorothy Cumming) and the Witch are two separate characters, and it is the latter who demands to have the heart of Snow White. Having first disguised herself as a hag to give Snow White a poisoned comb, the Queen later actually changes her sex to turn herself into a pieman in the scenario where the apple is replaced by a pie. In the end, Brangomar is punished by being turned into a peacock. (In another cut, she simply vanishes from the film). Elements from these versions of "Snow White", in particular the 1916 silent film, inspired Walt Disney's animated adaptation after he saw the film at a young age in 1917 and two decades later bought rights to the play.

In Mattel's Ever After High franchise, one of the lead character of the franchise is Raven Queen, the daughter of the original Evil Queen, along with Snow White's daughter Apple White. Raven is a rebel, frustrated with her destiny to become a new queen of evil, and wishes to go her own way. Most people see her as evil and mean, but she is actually misunderstood: she wishes to be herself and strives to rewrite her own chapter, thereby proving that evilness is not hereditary. The Evil Queen herself is locked up in Mirror Prison and often insults the things Raven talks about, including Raven's father, the Good King.

== See also ==
- Black Annis
- Wicked fairy (Sleeping Beauty)
