= Mira, Mirror =

2004 young adult fantasy novel by Mette Ivie Harrison

- Author: Mette Ivie Harrison
- Language: English
- Genre: Young adult fiction fantasy novel
- Publisher: Viking Press
- Publication date: September 2004
- Publication place: United States
- ISBN: 978-0142406434

Mira, Mirror is a 2004 young adult fantasy novel written by Mette Ivie Harrison. The story of the novel is told from the viewpoint of the magic mirror from the fairy tale "Snow White". "Mira" is a main character.

== Plot ==
A young girl, Mira, becomes an apprentice to a witch. The witch's other apprentice, Amanda, adopts Mira as a sister. Betraying their friendship, Amanda changes Mira into a magic mirror. The story refers to Amanda becoming the wicked queen of the "Snow White" fairy tale. Mira serves the wicked queen until her usefulness runs out and she is abandoned.

Several years pass when Ivana, a peasant girl running away from her cruel father, stumbles upon Mira. Mira manipulates Ivana into becoming friends with a wealthy merchant's daughter named Talia. Mira does this in hopes of gaining her human form back. Mira uses her magic to change the girls' appearances so each resembles the other. Unexpectedly, Talia is quite happy with her new form as she is trying to escape an arranged marriage. Mira works with Ivana and Talia for each of them to achieve their goals.

== Characters ==
- Mira: The story's protagonist and point-of-view character. A witch's apprentice trapped in a mirror, she possesses a number of magical abilities, particularly the ability to change the appearance of people.
- Zerba: A witch who purchases Mira at the start of the book.
- Amanda: A witch's apprentice who the author alludes to being the wicked queen in the Snow White fairy tale.
- Ivana: A peasant girl who runs away from her family and encounters Mira.
- Talia: The daughter of a merchant who is engaged to be part of an arranged marriage.
- Merchant Minitz: The biological father of Talia, and adopted father of Ivana.

== Reception ==
Mira, Mirror received mixed reviews. Kirkus Reviews gave an unfavorable review stating: "Purporting to explore weighty issues between sisters, of magic, power, and love, this weakly executed and excruciatingly tedious tale falls short." Praising the book for its story and writing, author and critic, Orson Scott Card said of the book: "I cannot recommend this novel highly enough." The New England Science Fiction Association reviewed the book as "enjoyable".
