= The Princess and the Hound =

2007 young adult, fantasy novel by Mette Ivie Harrison

- Author: Mette Ivie Harrison
- Language: English
- Genre: Young adult fiction/fantasy novel
- Publisher: HarperCollins
- Publication date: May 2007
- Publication place: United States
- Media type: Print (hardcover & paperback)
- Pages: 410 pp
- ISBN: 9780061131875

The Princess and the Hound is a young adult, fantasy novel written by Mette Ivie Harrison. The book was first published in 2007 by HarperCollins.

== Plot summary ==
The story focuses on two characters, Prince George and Princess Beatrice, that have been arranged to be married. Prince George possesses a magical ability to speak with animals which is forbidden in the kingdom where he lives. Princess Beatrice has a hound that travels with her everywhere and is abused by people around her. The plot revolves around the meeting of Prince George and Princess Beatrice as they work to get to know each other. Their courtship is pressured by the illness facing Prince’s George’s father. It is revealed that the illness is not of natural causes and that Princess Beatrice has been enchanted.

== Reception ==
Critical reaction to The Princess and the Hound was generally positive. Critics have called the novel "a well-crafted novel that everyone can enjoy" and "original and innovative." Kirkus Reviews considered the book: "Not for readers who want fast pacing or strong action, but still a well-told tale."

== Themes ==
In an analysis of The Princess and the Hound, Orson Scott Card writes:

When Mette Ivie Harrison takes us into a magical world, she is really taking us deeper into our own reality, where teenagers struggle to find some balance between the demands of the adult world, which insists that they fit in with established roles, and the demands of their own hearts, which yearn for freedom, for greatness, for something that is uniquely themselves.
