= Arseny Koreshchenko =

Russian composer (1870–1921)

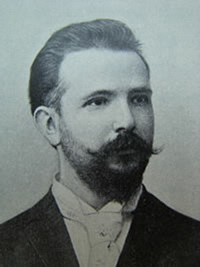
Arseny Koreshchenko in 1920

Arseny Nikolayevich Koreshchenko (Russian: Арсений Николаевич Корещенко, 18 December 1870 – 6 January 1921) was a pianist and composer of classical music, including operas and ballets. He was from the Russian Empire.

== Biography ==
Koreshchenko was born in Moscow in 1870. He entered the Moscow Conservatory, graduating in 1891. He was only the second person ever to be awarded the Conservatory's Great Gold Medal; the first was one of his teachers, Sergei Taneyev, and the third was Sergei Rachmaninoff. He also studied theory under Anton Arensky.

He stayed with his alma mater as a professor of harmony and also taught counterpoint at the Moscow Synodal School.

He died in Kharkov in 1921.

== List of works ==
=== Opera ===
- Belshazzar's Feast, Op. 7 (1 act, produced Moscow, 1892)
- The Angel of Death, Op. 10 (2 acts, based on Mikhail Lermontov)
- The Ice Palace, Op. 38 (based on Ivan Lazhechnikov's play; produced Moscow 1900)

=== Ballet ===
- The Magic Mirror, Op. 39

=== Incidental music ===
- The Trojan Women (Euripides), Op. 15
- Iphigenia in Aulis (Euripides), Op. 18

=== Choral works ===
- Don Juan, cantata, Op. 5
- Armenian Songs, Op. 8
- Prologue for the 25th anniversary of the Moscow Conservatory, Op. 9
- Armenian Songs, Op. 13
- Georgian Songs, Op. 27c
- other (Opp. 16, 29, 32, 37)

=== Orchestral ===
- Barcarolle, Op. 6
- A Tale, Op. 11
- Scène poétique, Op. 12
- Two Symphonic Sketches, Op. 14
- Armenian Suite, Op. 20 (also arranged for piano 4 hands)
- Scènes nocturnes, Op. 21
- Symphony No. 1 Lyric, Op. 23
- Musical Picture, Op. 27a

=== Concertante ===
- Concert Fantasy in D minor, for piano and orchestra (or two pianos), Op. 3 (pub. 1895)

=== Chamber ===
- String Quartet, Op. 25
- Two pieces for Cello and Piano, Op. 34 (?1898, ded. Anatoliy Brandukov) (1. Sonnet d’amour, A major; 2. Barcarolle, A minor)

=== Piano ===
- Trois Morceaux, Op. 1 (1893) (1. Berceuse; 2. Étude; 3. Polonaise)
- Suite Armeniènne, Op. 20 (5 pieces) (arr. of the orchestral suite for pf duet and pf solo by the composer, pub. 1897) (1. Au ruisseau (Lento non troppo); 2. Scherzo (Allegro moderato); 3. Tempo di valse; 4. Danse armenienne (Allegretto grazioso e non troppo); 5. Finale (Lesghinka) (Allegro ma non troppo))
- Scènes Enfantines, Op. 22 (6 pieces, 1898, ded. Josef Hoffman) (1. L'ogre; 2. Petit scherzo; 3. Petite marche; 4. Complainte; 5. Menuet; 6. Valse à la Neapolitaine)
- Quatre Morceaux, Op. 30 (1897) (1. Nocturne; 2. Gavotte; 3. Rapsodie Georgiènne No. 1; 4. Rapsodie Georgiènne No. 2)
- Morceaux Caractéristiques, Op. 40 (1904, ded. Aleksandr Goldenweiser) (1. Prélude; 2. Intermezzo; 3. Aveu; 4. Barcarolle; 5. Une page de mes mémoires; 6. Quéstion douloureuse; 7. Impromptu)
- Piano Pieces, Op. 47 (1915) (of which no. 7 is an Impromptu, A flat major)
- other (Opp. 19, 33)

=== Songs ===
- about 80 songs (Opp. 2, 26, 28, 31, 35, 36)

== Sources ==
- Eric Blom, ed., Grove's Dictionary of Music and Musicians, 5th ed., 1954
