= Fawzia Gilani-Williams =

British scholar of Islamic children's literature

- Occupation: Author of children's books, Scholar
- Language: English

Fawzia Gilani-Williams is a British scholar of Islamic children's literature. She is also an author of children's literature as 'mirror books', an approach to writing and storytelling that reflects visibility for readers in story. A significant number of her children's books are Islamic adaptations of Western tales, often featuring Muslim characters in caring interaction with each other and with Hebrew or Hindu characters.

== Awards ==
Her children's book Yaffa and Fatima: Shalom, Salaam, illustrated by Chiara Fedele, received a Sydney Taylor Book Award in 2018 from the Association of Jewish Libraries.

== Bibliography ==
- Gilani-Williams, F., Bridget Hodder.(2023) The Promise.
- Gilani-Williams, F., Bridget Hodder.(2022) The Button Box.
- Gilani-Williams, F. (2020). Henna on my Hands. Bengaluru: Tulika Books.
- Gilani-Williams, F. (2019). Adil Ali's Shoe. Speaking Tiger ISBN 9350469545.
- Gilani-Williams, F. (2017). Yaffa and Fatima: shalom, salaam. Minneapolis: Kar-Ben Publishing. ISBN 9781467794237.
- Gilani-Williams, F. (2010). Nabeel's New Pants: an Eid tale. New York: Marshall Cavendish. ISBN 0-761-45629-5
- Gilani-Williams, F. (2013). Snow White – An Islamic Tale. Leicester. England: Islamic Foundation.ISBN 0860375269
- Gilani, F. (2002). The Adventures of Musab. London: Ta-Ha Publishers.ASIN B01FELR78W

== Selected publications ==
- Gilani-Williams, Fawzia. (2016). "The emergence of Western Islamic children’s literature". Mousaion, 34 (2), 113-126.
- Gilani-Williams, F. (2014). Islamic critical theory: A tool for emancipatory education. International Journal of Islamic Thought, 5, 16-27.
- Gilani, F. & Bigger, S. (2010) Muslim Pupils, Children's Fiction and Personal Understanding. Almas International Research Journal of Urdu, 12, 1-9. Print. ISSN 1818-9296
