= C. J. Redwine =

American author

C.J. Redwine
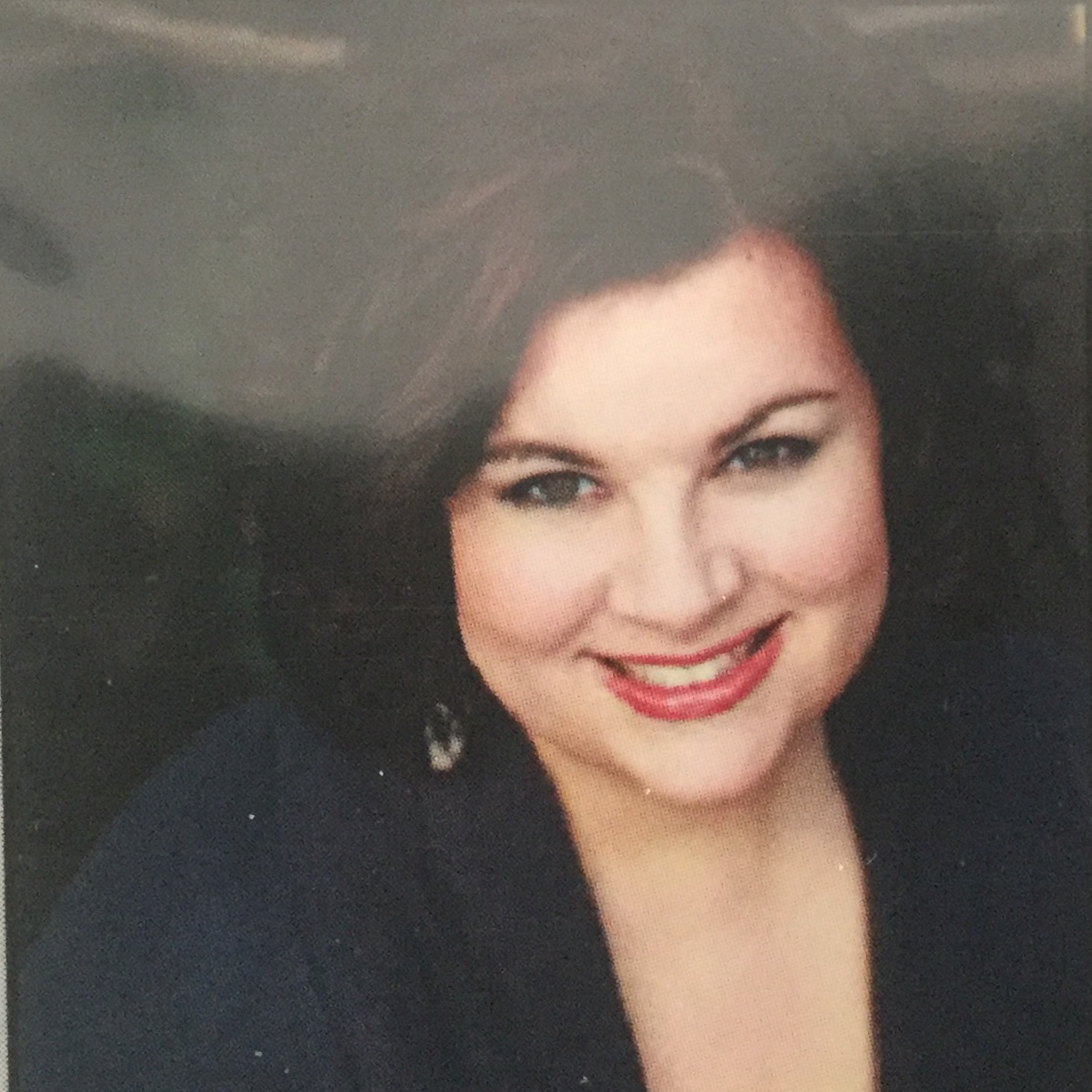
- Education: Pepperdine University
- Occupation: Writer
- Children: 5
- Website: cjredwine.com

C. J. Redwine is an American writer of science fiction and fantasy. She is the New York Times bestselling author of the Defiance Trilogy (also known as the Courier's Daughter Trilogy), the Ravenspire series, the Rise of the Vicious Princess duology, a nonfiction resource on query writing, and an Audible original titled The Disappearance of Emily Downs.

== Biography ==
Redwine was born in California on January 8, 1974. She graduated from Turlock Christian School in 1992 and then attended Pepperdine University (in Malibu, California), where she received a degree in English literature and a teaching credential. She currently lives in Myrtle Beach, South Carolina with her family. She also co-owns the-writers-sanctuary.com, where she hosts virtual and in-person writing workshops, retreats, and conferences.

== Career ==
Redwine's debut novel, Defiance, was released in 2012, and tells a post-apocalyptic fantasy story for young adults. The second book in the Defiance Trilogy, Deception, was published in August 2013. A prequel novella to Redwine's Defiance and Deception called Outcast was published in July 2014. The final installment in the Defiance Trilogy, Deliverance, was published on August 26, 2014.

Redwine published The Shadow Queen, the first novel in the Ravenspire series, on February 16, 2016. It debuted on the New York Times bestsellers list. The Wish Granter, the second book in the Ravenspire series, was published on February 14, 2017. The third book in the series, The Traitor Prince, was published on February 13, 2018, and the fourth book, The Blood Spell, published on February 12, 2019. The novels are all stand-alone companion novels, and each retells a fantasy fairy tale set in adjoining kingdoms.

Redwine also has a non-fiction resource book for writers titled Query: Everything You Need to Know to Get Started, Get Noticed, and Get Signed. She has short works of fiction in the Welcome Home anthology and the Mistletoe and Magic anthology. In 2021, her first Audible Original, a middle grade sci-fi thriller titled The Disappearance of Emily Downs, debuted.

Her most recent work of fiction is the start of a Young Adult (YA) political fantasy duology, titled Rise of the Vicious Princess and published on June 14, 2022.

== Bibliography ==
=== Novels ===
==== Fiction ====
- Defiance (2012)
- Deception (2013)
- Deliverance (2014)
- The Shadow Queen (2016)
- The Wish Granter (2017)
- The Traitor Prince (2018)
- The Blood Spell (2019)
- The Disappearance of Emily Downs (2021)
- Rise of the Vicious Princess (2022)

==== Non-fiction ====
- QUERY (2014)

=== Novellas ===
- Outcast (2014)
- The Wicked Woods (2018)

=== Anthologies ===
- Welcome Home – featuring the short story "Broken Stars"
- Mistletoe & Magic – featuring the short story "The Uninvited Guest"
