= Mette Ivie Harrison =

American novelist

- Mette Ivie Harrison at CONduit 17
- Born: September 13, 1970 (age 56); Summit, New Jersey, U.S.
- Education: Brigham Young University; Princeton University (PhD)
- Occupation: Author
- Known for: columnist, novelist

Mette Ivie Harrison (born September 13, 1970) is an American novelist. She writes young adult fiction and in 2014 began publishing an adult mystery series. Her background as a Mormon has influenced her topics of interest as a writer, especially in the A Linda Wallheim Mystery series which focuses on a Mormon woman within her religious community. Her novel, Mira, Mirror won the Utah Letters About Literature award in 2006, and three other novels were finalists for the AML Awards in 2007, 2014 and 2015.

== Early life ==
Mette Ivie was born on 13 September 1970 in Summit, New Jersey. Her father was Evan Ivie (d. 2020), a computer scientist who worked for thirteen years at Bell Labs and being involved in developing Unix programming language. She was the ninth of eleven children, eight of whom followed their father into careers involving computer programming.

When she was ten years old, Evan Ivie moved the family to Provo, Utah, where he began teaching computer programming at Brigham Young University, a position that he would hold for twenty years. Due to a mix-up at her school, she was given the name "Eddie" in fourth grade. She decided to take advantage of that confusion to present as a boy until puberty made that more difficult.

As a teenager Mette Ivie studied German, and she spent 1985 attending a German gymnasium. In 1988 she received BYU's "Ezra Taft Benson Scholarship". She graduated from BYU two years later with bachelor's and master's degrees in German Literature. She received a full scholarship to attend Princeton University and in 1995 earned a PhD in Germanic Languages and Literatures. She wrote her dissertation on the female Bildungsroman of the 18th century.

She was married to Matt Harrison, and they had six children. In 2021 the couple are finalizing a divorce. In 2017 she was diagnosed with high-functioning autism, which initially made her hyper-aware of her differences from neurotypical people. She wrote about her experience with high-functioning autism in Sunstone magazine, where she noted that participation in the LDS Church helped her to make social connections that she otherwise would not have pursued. She described how her lack of "normal facial expressions" leads other church members to underestimate the depth of her feelings, especially depression. Since Harrison does not intuitively understand human interactions, she attributes her proficiency in portraying human interactions in her writing to her need to analyze human behavior closely. She also has described her approach to gender, writing "I tend to call myself either “agender” or “autigender” because I don't think I really understand what gender is."

== Career ==
Harrison left her job as an adjunct professor at Brigham Young University in 1997. In 1999, her first book, The Monster In Me, was accepted for publication.

=== Works and awards ===
Her novel, Mira, Mirror won the Utah Letters About Literature award in 2006. In 2007 Harrison's The Princess and the Hound was a finalist for the Association for Mormon Letters (AML) Young Adult Literature award. The Bishop's Wife was a finalist for the AML Novel Award in 2014, and His Right Hand was a finalist for the same award in 2015.

Harrison regularly wrote in the religion section of The Huffington Post on topics of the Church of Jesus Christ of Latter-day Saints (LDS Church) over the span of 2015–2017. Her articles describe common misconceptions of LDS beliefs, addressing people outside of the LDS Church and also focusing on her internal religious audience. Harrison's articles describe her concern about the culture of the LDS Church while also pointing out the positives of her religion.

In 2025, she published a mystery featuring a neurodivergent sleuth.

Harrison writes for Orson Scott Card's Intergalactic Medicine Show, giving writing advice to authors.

=== A Linda Wallheim Mystery series ===
Harrison uses her religious background to write mysteries on LDS cultural issues. The A Linda Wallheim Mystery series is about a Mormon bishop's wife who uncovers terrible truths within her community. In an interview with Publishers Weekly, Harrison said, "I want to make a 'regular' Mormon woman the heroine of the story". Harrison feels that Mormon women are often overlooked or forgotten. This series gives others a look into LDS culture while delving into situations that LDS members neglect to address.

Kirkus Reviews favorably reviewed The Bishop's Wife (2014), the first book in the series, stating that "this decidedly adult tale adds twists aplenty to an insider's look at a religion replete with its own mysteries". Janet Maslin of The New York Times said the novel was "apt to offend most Mormon men" and praised the way Harrison helped readers contemplate the "question of how dangerous fire-breathing extremists really are". The Bishop's Wife was an ABA IndieNext Selection for December 2015 and a national bestseller.

== Bibliography ==
The Hound Saga
This series is sometimes called the Animal Magic Universe.

- The Princess and the Hound, May 2008, HarperTeen, ISBN 978-0-06-113188-2
- The Princess and the Bear, May 2009, HarperTeen, ISBN 978-0-06-155314-1
- The Princess and the Snowbird, May 2010, SHarperTeen, ISBN 978-0-06-155317-2
- The Princess and the Horse, March 2015, self, ISBN 978-1-939993-54-0
- The Princess and the Wolf, March 2015, self, ISBN 978-1-939993-56-4

Linda Wallheim mysteries

1. The Bishop's Wife, December 2014, Soho Crime, ISBN 978-1-61695-476-5
2. His Right Hand, December 2015, Soho Crime, ISBN 978-1-61695-610-3
3. For Time and All Eternities, January 2017, Soho Crime, ISBN 978-1-61695-666-0
4. Not of This Fold, December 2018, Soho Crime, ISBN 978-1-61695-942-5
5. The Prodigal Daughter, May 2021, Soho Crime
6. The Millstone, Soho Crime (manuscript completed 2021)

Ada Latia mystery

- A Special Interest in Murder, September 2025, Severn House, ISBN 9781448316434

Standalone

- The Monster In Me, May 2003, Holiday House, ISBN 0823417131
- Mira, Mirror, September 2004, Viking Juvenile, ISBN 0-670-05923-4
- Tris & Izzie, October 2011, Egmont USA, ISBN 978-1-60684-173-0
- The Rose Throne, May 2013, Egmont USA, ISBN 978-1-60684-365-9
- The Book of Laman, July 2017, By Common Consent Press, ISBN 9780998605241

Short fiction

- "A Mother's Curse", collected in The Usual Santas, October 2017, Soho Crime, ISBN 978-1-61695-775-9

Essays

- "A Teenless World", collected in "Ender's World", April 2013, BenBella Books, ISBN 978-1-937856-21-2

Non-fiction

- Ironmom: Training and Racing with a Family of 7, June 2013, Familius, ISBN 9781938301360
