= The Magic Mirror (ballet) =

1903 ballet by Marius Petipa

Le Miroir Magique
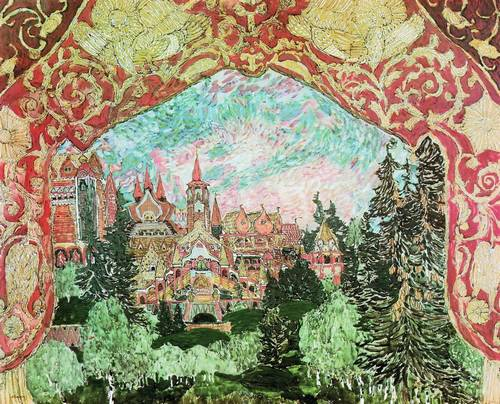
- Set design by Aleksandr Golovin
- Choreographer: Marius Petipa
- Music: Arseny Koreshchenko
- Based on: Grimm's Snow White; Alexander Pushkin's The Tale of the Dead Princess and the Seven Knights
- Premiere: 22 February [O.S. 9 February] 1903; Imperial Mariinsky Theatre, St. Petersburg
- Design: Aleksandr Golovin (scenery); Guria Longuinovna Teliakovsky (costumes)
- Type: Ballet-féerie

The Magic Mirror (French: Le Miroir Magique) is a ballet-féerie in four acts and seven scenes, originally choreographed by Marius Petipa with music by Arseny Koreshchenko. The libretto is based on the 1812 fairy tale Snow White by the Brothers Grimm and the 1833 poem The Tale of the Dead Princess and the Seven Knights by Alexander Pushkin. The ballet was premièred on the 22 February [O.S. 9 February] 1903 at the Imperial Mariinsky Theatre in St. Petersburg, Russia.

== History ==
The Magic Mirror was the final ballet to be staged by Petipa and was probably his most controversial. Prince Serge Volkonsky commissioned Petipa to create the ballet in 1902, but soon afterwards, Volkonsky was forced to resign from his position as director after an incident with the Prima Ballerina, Mathilde Kschessinskaya and instead, The Magic Mirror was staged under the direction of Col. Vladimir Teliakovsky, Petipa's bitterest enemy. Teliakovsky was determined to de-throne Petipa from his rank of ballet master and Petipa writes in his memoirs that Teliakovsky would stop at nothing to get rid of him and that he believed it was Teliakovsky's plan to sabotage what was to be his last ballet. The Magic Mirror was given the most appalling staging imaginable with horrific scenery designs and costumes that were unfinished and provoked unanimous laughter.

The Magic Mirror was a complete disaster and was received with whistles, cat-calls and even shouts of "curtain" in subsequent performances after the première. Although it was given two abridged performances in 1904, the ballet never found a permanent place in the Imperial Ballet repertoire. It did, however, find a home in Moscow, where it was staged in a revival by Alexander Gorsky and was performed thirty-six times between 1905 and 1911. Despite the failure of the original production, in all the scathing reviews for The Magic Mirror, including a very notorious one by Sergei Diaghilev, Petipa's choreography is never criticised.

Petipa gives the following account in his memoirs of how he was convinced that the ballet's poor staging was all part of a conspiracy to get rid of him:

... Already, during the rehearsals of this ballet, I was convinced that was something was being plotted against me and my ballet, the commission for which had been given to M. Koreshchenko and me by M. Volkonsky, and not by M. Teliakovsky. Mlle. Kschessinskaya took an active part in this intrigue, revenging herself because at the benefit of her late father, I had not greeted him with a speech.

== Roles and original cast ==
Role	Dancer
The Princess	Mathilde Kschessinskaya
The Prince	Sergei Legat
The Queen	Marie Petipa
The King	Pavel Gerdt
The Nurse	Nadezhda Petipa
A Polish Magnate	Josef Kschessinsky
The Princess's Retinue	Anna Pavlova & Lyubov Egorova
The Prince's Retinue	Mikhail Oblakov & Mikhail Fokine

== Libretto ==
Taken from Roland John Wiley's translation of the original libretto.

ACT 1 – A garden in front of the palace

Scene 1

Gardeners, men and women, are decorating the garden, weaving baskets and preparing garlands for the Queen.

Scene 2

The King and Queen enter with courtly ladies and cavaliers; the Queen is young and beautiful, the King old; he tries to please the Queen. Baskets and garlands are brought to the Queen.

Scene 3

The King orders the lace merchants to be led in, whom he has summoned, together with the lace-makers and workmen of their countries, and also the merchants of old Bohemian crystal and precious stones. Among other objects, there is a beautiful ‘magic’ mirror, which possesses the property of reflecting the most beautiful woman in the entire realm. The Queen, seeing her own reflection, is delighted, much to the joy of the King, who buys the mirror. The Queen, rejoicing, invites the courtiers to dance.

After the Mazurka, the King orders for the mirror to be taken to the Queen's room. The Queen looks into the mirror again, but to her question, “Am I the most beautiful of all?” the mirror reflects the image of the Princess. The Queen is horrified. In the loud distance, trumpets are heard; the Queen is upset.

Scene 4

The Princess and her fiancé, the Prince enters with their retinues. The King is overjoyed. The secret envy of the Queen, who recognises in the Princess's face the image that reflected in the mirror, that is, of the one woman whose beauty exceeds her own.

At the end of the Pas d’action, the Queen, extremely upset, asks the mirror again, “Who is the most beautiful of all?” and once again, the mirror presents the Princess's image in all its beauty. This time the Queen, in a fit of envy and anger, faints. All rush to her assistance.

ACT 2

Scene 1 – A park

At the rise of the curtain, the Queen is on stage, her gaze fixed on the mirror. She says to herself, “As long as the Princess is here, I will not be the most beautiful… she must die!”

Scene 2

The Queen calls for the Princess's nurse and says to her, “Listen carefully to my commands: you will go into the forest with the Princess and you will kill her!” Horrified, the nurse pleads, “Take pity, take pity on the young Princess, whom I love so much!” “No!” answers the Queen, “there shall be no mercy. She must die and you must obey me. If not… you will die…” She hands her a dagger.

Scene 3

They announce the Princess's arrival. She has come to ask the Queen to be present at her wedding. Hiding her envy, the Queen receives the Princess courteously and agrees to her request. Then the Queen asks her to go into the nearby forest with her nurse to pick forget-me-nots, of which the Queen is extremely fond. The Princess, delighted that she can bring pleasure to the Queen, kisses her hand and leaves with the nurse.

Scene 4

As soon as she leaves, the Queen walks up to the mirror and says to herself: “Now I shall be the most beautiful of all.”

Scene 5 – A dense forest

The Princess enters with her nursemaid. Compelled to obey the Queen, the nurse is trembling. The Princess looks around in all directions and says to her, “This forest frightens me; there are no forget-me-nots here; why did you bring me so far from the castle?” “The Queen commanded me,” the nurse answers. “Why?” asks the Princess. “She commanded me to bring you to this forest and to kill you!” “Me? Why? What have I done?” “You are more beautiful than she,” the nurse sobs. “And you must kill me for that? No, no that is not possible! You would not commit such a horrible deed!” “It must be thus,” the nurse answers, weeping and holding the dagger in her hand. The Princess pleads on her knees, “Take pity on me, on my youth!” The nurse, powerfully moved, throws down the dagger, and embraces her, kisses her, saying, “Stay here, try to get your bearings and find a way out of this horrible forest.” They pray. Then the nurse kisses her warmly again and saying, “May the Lord protect you,” she flees like one insane.

Scene 6

The Princess calls after her for help, but in vain. The nurse is too far away to hear the Princess's calls. Trembling, the Princess looks to find her way, walking through the trees and trying to get out of the forest, she disappears among them.

Scene 7

Little by little, the stage fills with dryads, who have gathered for diversion.

Scene 8

After the dryads’ dance, a curtain rises at the back of the stage and in the clear distance; the Queen's shade is seen, wrathfully threatening the Princess's nurse for having spared her. The nurse falls at the Queen's feet and begs for her forgiveness. The Queen rudely throws her back. Then the Queen commands that she herself be dressed in peasant's clothes so that she may realise her own intention, having conceived the idea of giving the princess a poisoned apple. The Princess's maid dresses her. The Vision disappears.

Scene 9 – Huts and a cave on rocky hills

Gnomes come out of the cave and down from the hills: some are carrying sheaves of brushwood; others are digging out passageways in the crags.

Scene 10

The Princess rushes in, frightened, for she cannot find her way out of the forest... suddenly she finds herself surrounded by gnomes, who are fascinated with her and try to calm her down. The Elder of the Gnomes leads her into his hut, where she is attired in a dress of tree leaves.

Scene 11

A merry dance of the gnomes.

Scene 12

The Princess appears in her dress of leaves, strewn with dew-drops. The gnomes ask her to dance and she agrees. The gnomes stand in groups and beat time on their anvils, accompanying the Princess during her dance. After the variations, the Elder of the Gnomes takes the Princess into the hut and advises her not to admit anybody during his absence. The gnomes depart for work with their implements.

Scene 13

The Queen, dressed as a peasant girl and carrying a basket of apples, appears stealthily and knocks on the door of the hut.

Scene 14

The Princess comes out, meets her with compassion and gives her some bread. In gratitude, the Queen offers an apple (poisoned). The Princess at first declines the apple, then accepts it, takes a bite and, stunned, falls down as if dead. The Queen gloats over her deed and fails to notice that she has dropped her handkerchief; seeing that the gnomes are returning, she runs out.

Scene 15

The gnomes joyfully return, but horror seizes them at the sight of the Princess. The Elder of the Gnomes finds the handkerchief and shows it to the others, evidence that an outside has been there.

ACT 3 – The Grand Forest

Scene 1

The Prince appears in search of the Princess. He is despondent, sorrowful and tired. He sits down next to a large tree to rest and falls asleep.

Scene 2

The Prince's dream – sunlight and dance of the sunrays.

Scene 3

The sun slowly sets and the moon appears in its place, surrounded by stars.

Scene 4

Grand pas of the Princess escorted by zephyrs and stars.

Scene 5

The Prince (that is, his shade) wants to draw the Princess into his embrace; they rush towards each other, but they cannot come together. At the very moment they are about to embrace, darkness falls and everything disappears.

Scene 6

The Prince awakens, still under the influence of his dream. He tries to orient himself to the forest, looks around, asking himself, “What path must I take to return to the castle?”

He climbs the tree; as he does, at the back of the stage, a valley appears; the sky is studded with stars. From the height of the tree, the Prince sees the castle; he climbs down and exits in the direction of the castle.

ACT 4

Scene 1

The gnomes are carrying the Princess away in a glass coffin covered with flowers; they place the coffin deep in a grotto. The gnomes leave praying; one remains to stand guard and then falls asleep.

Scene 2

Dance of the everlasting flowers.

Scene 3

The Elder of the Gnomes comes forward; behind him follows the King, Queen, the Prince, the nurse and the King's grooms. The gnome shows them the place where the Princess rests. The Queen conceals her joy. The King is sorrowful. The nurse is crying. The Prince, in despair at the sight of the dead Princess, approaches the grating. He breaks the grating and the coffin. At that instant, the apple rolls out in front of the Prince.

Scene 4

The Princess comes to life... the Queen stands in astonishment, as if turned to stone. The others express their great joy. The Princess stands up (she is wrapped in a gold coverlet), glides along like a shade as the coverlet falls away; she sees the Prince, who rushes to embrace her.

The Queen's horror...

The King's excitement...

The Prince's delight and the pervasive joy

The gnome hands the King the handkerchief as material evidence of who gave the Princess the poisoned apple. The King recognises the Queen's handkerchief and shows it to her asking, “Is this your handkerchief?”

“Yes,” the Queen answers trembling with anger and fear, “I don’t understand how it came to be in the hands of this gnome.”

“Was it you who gave her the poisoned apple?”

“No… no…” in her fury, she cannot pronounce another word.

The King asks his daughter who gave her the apple. The Prince also begs her to recount everything. The Princess answers, “A poor peasant girl, who was carrying a basket of apples.”

At that moment, the nursemaid, all in tears, no longer able to keep the secret, tells everything that happened, but the Princess stops her and finishes the story. The King is frightfully angry and threatens the Queen with the dungeon. A sudden derangement of the Queen's mind, who, in an attack of insanity, tells all what she ordered done and then falls dead.

Scene 5 – A hall in the castle

The betrothal of the Prince and Princess. In this last scene, character dances and classical pas.

== Résume of scenes and dances ==
Taken from the piano reduction score of Arseny Koreshchenko's score as issued by the publisher, A. Gutheil.

Act I

- Introduction
- No. 01 Scène les jardiniers et les jardinières
- No. 02 L'entrée du roi. Tempo di marzia
- No. 03 Danse des jardiniers et les jardinières
- No. 04 L'entrée des marchands
- No. 05 Variations

—a. Baracolle
—b. Ecossaise
—c. Variation pour les ouvrières des dentelles de Bruxelles
—d. Danse russe
—e. Variation (vendeuses des pièrres fines)

- No. 06 Scène du miroir
- No. 07 Danses

—a. Petite polonaise
—b. Mazurka

- No. 08 Scène
- No. 09 Apparition du Prince et la Princesse
- No. 10 Grand Pas d'action—

—a. Adagio
—b. Allegretto
—c. Variation (Andantino)
—d. Variation (Allegro non troppo)
—e. Variation pour le Prince
—f. Variation pour la Princesse (Tempo di valse)
—g. Coda

Act II, Scene 1

- No. 11 Entr'acte et scène

Act II, Scene 2

- No. 12 Une forêt impracticable
- No. 13 Danse des Dryads. Tempo di valse

Act II, Scene 3

- No. 14 Marche des gnomes
- No. 15 Danse des gnomes
- No. 16 Variation pour la Princesse (avec l'accompagnement des enclumes)
- No. 17 Scène (La reine-mendiante et la Princesse)
- No. 18 Scène finale. Retour des gnomes, qui trouvent la Princesse morte

Act III, Scene 1

- No. 19 Entr'acte et scène 1. La grand forêt
- No. 20 Scène 2: Songe du Prince (Le soleil luit)

— Danse des rayons du soleil

- No. 21 (Le soleil se couche)

— Apparition de la lune, entourée d'étoiles

- No. 22 Grand Pas d'action pour la Princesse, Zéphire et les étoiles (Valse);

—a. Adagio
—b. Variation des étoiles
—c. Variation du Zéphire
—d. Variation de la Princesse
—e. Coda

- No. 23 Panorama

Act IV, Scene 1

- No. 24 Le cortège aux flambeaux. Marche funèbre (Les gnomes portent la Princesse morte, couverte de fleurs)
- No. 25 Danse des immortelles
- No. 26 Grand scène mimique

Act IV, Scene 2

- No. 27 Marche
- No. 28 Divertissement—

—a. Cracovienne
—b. Pas de deux (Prince et Princesse)
—c. Variation pour le Prince
—d. Variation pour la Princesse
—e. Coda
—f. Danse hongrois
—g. Danse tyrolienne
—h. Variation 1
—i. Variation 2
—j. Variation 3
—k. Coda
—l. Pas de caratère Saxon

- Supplemental - Valse "Flora"
- Supplemental - Pas tryolien. Valse
- Supplemental - Adagio by Koreshchenko in collaboration with Riccardo Drigo
- Supplemental - Variation du Prince (for Sergei Legat) by Riccardo Drigo
