= Risala =

Risāla (Arabic: رِسالة), also spelled risalah, risalat, resala, resalah, or resalat, plural: rasa'il (رَسائِل), is an Arabic word meaning "letter", "epistle", "treatise", or "message". It may refer to:

== Literary genre ==
- Risalah (fiqh), a summary of religious rulings in Islamic jurisprudence

== Writings ==
- Risalat al-Huquq or Treatise of Rights, a work attributed to the Shi'ite Imam Ali ibn al-Husayn Zayn al-Abidin (c. 659 – c. 713)
- Al-Risalah al-Dhahabiah or The Golden Treatise, a work on medicine attributed to the Shi'ite Imam Ali ibn Musa al-Rida (765–818)
- Al-Risala (al-Shafiʽi book), a seminal work on fiqh (Islamic jurisprudence) by Muhammad ibn Idris al-Shafi'i (d. 820)
- Risala, a travelogue by Ahmad ibn Fadlan (10th century)
- Al-Risalah (Ibn Abi Zayd), a book on Maliki fiqh by Ibn Abi Zayd (10th century)
- Rasa'il Ikhwan al-Safa or the Epistles of the Brethren of Purity, an encyclopedic collection of philosophical treatises (10th century)
- Risalat al-Ghufran or The Epistle of Forgiveness, a satirical work of Arabic poetry written by Abu al-ʿAlaʾ al-Maʿarri around 1033
- Al-Risala al-Qushayriyya, a Sufi text by al-Qushayri (11th century)
- Rasa'il al-Hikma or the Epistles of Wisdom, a corpus of sacred texts and pastoral letters in Druze tradition (11th century)
- Risālat Fādil ibn Nātiq ("The Treatise of Fādil ibn Nātiq"), better known as Theologus Autodidactus, a theological novel written by Ibn al-Nafis between 1268 and 1277
- Resaleh-ye haqiqat-nameh ("Treatise on Revealing the Truth"), an 1823 Persian-language work by Alexander Kasimovich Kazembek, part of wider 19th-century eastern missionary activity
- Risale-i Nur, a tafsir (exegesis of the Quran) by Said Nursî written between the 1910s and the 1950s
- Risalah Ramadaniyya, treatise composed during the month of Ramadan by the Da'i al-Mutlaq (spiritual leader) in Tayyibi Isma'ilism

== Media ==
- Arrissalah, Arabic weekly cultural magazine for literature, science, and art, published in Cairo from 1933 to 1953
- Al-Resalah Satellite TV, an Arabic Islamic television channel
- al-Risala, the original-language title of the Arabic film The Message (1976 film)
- Al-Risala, a defunct Hamas publication
- Resalat (newspaper), a conservative daily newspaper in Iran
- Risala Weekly, a weekly Islamic magazine published since 1983 in Kozhikode, India

== Places ==
- Ar-Risala, a populated place in Baghdad Governorate, Iraq
- Resālat, another name for Qaleh Khan, North Khorasan, a village in Iran
- Resalat (district), a neighborhood located in the eastern part of Tehran, Iran
- Resalat Expressway, the former name of Qasem Soleimani Expressway, an east-west expressway in Tehran, Iran
- Risala Bazar or Risala Road, commercial area in Hyderabad, India

== Organizations ==
- Al-Resalah Party, a Jordanian political party
- Resala Charity Organization, a non-profit organization based in Egypt

== See also ==
- The "message" of Allah to mankind revealed via "messengers"; see rasūl
- Risala, Mughal-era term for a cavalry unit commanded by a Risaldar in the Indian and Pakistan armies
