= Alexander Kazembek =

Alexander Kazembek may refer to:

- Alexander Kasimovich Kazembek (1802–1870), 19th century Russian historian, linguist, and orientalist
- Alexander Lvovich Kazembek (1902–1977), Russian émigré monarchist, founder of the Mladorossi
