= Ivan the Terrible in Russian folklore =

Ivan the Terrible was a rather popular character in Russian folklore. Interest is caused by its contradiction to the real historical figure of the first Russian Tsar, as well as the possible reasons for this.

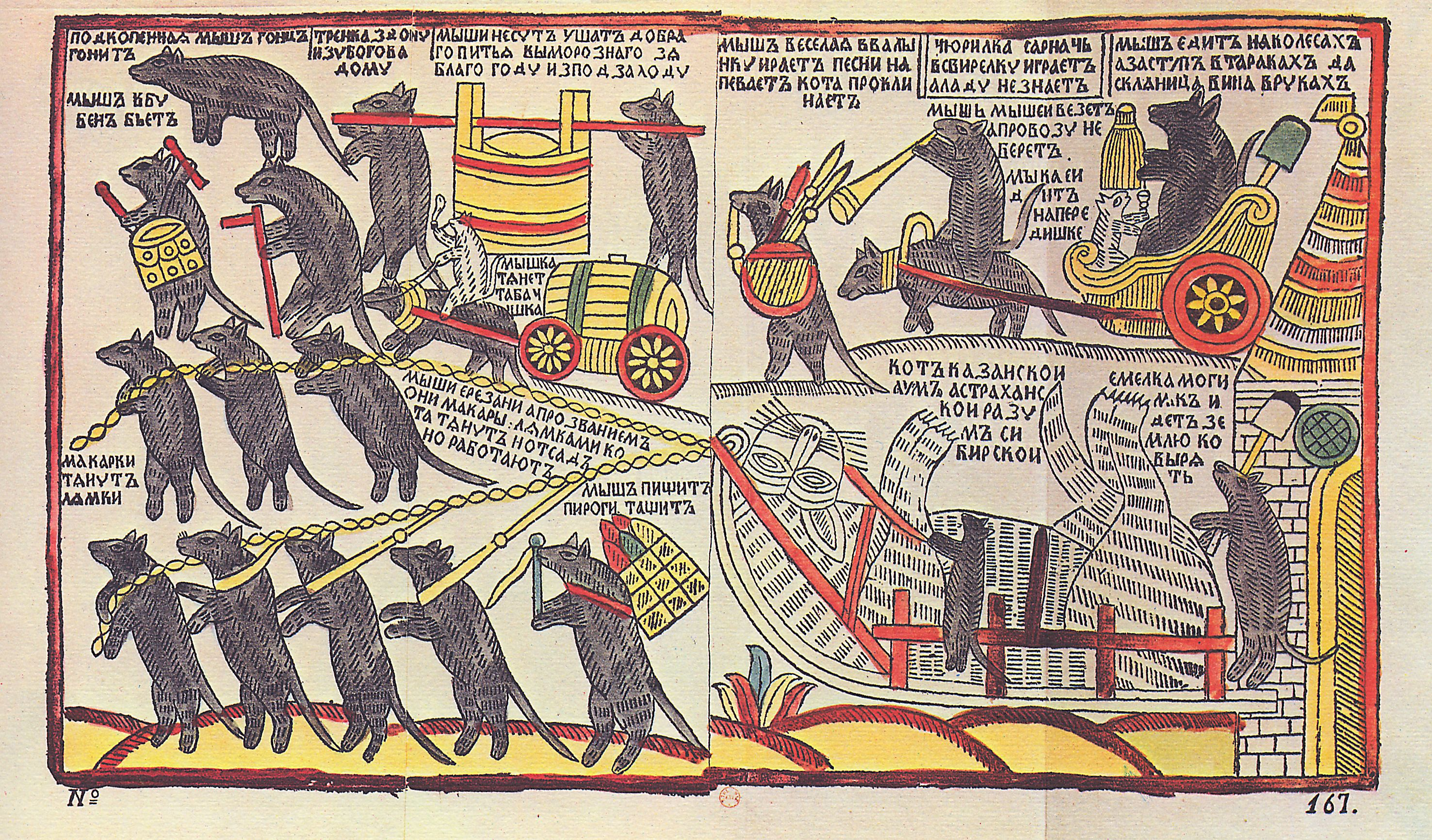
The Mice Are Burying the Cat, a 1760s lubok print. The caption above the cat reads: "The Cat of Kazan, the Mind of Astrakhan, the Wisdom of Siberia" (a parody of the title of Russian tsars, the first of which was Ivan the Terrible).

== The genesis of folklore and its connection with the historical figure of Ivan the Terrible ==
The earliest records of Russian folklore about Ivan the Terrible were made by Samuel Collins in the mid to late 17th century, almost a hundred years after the end of his reign. At the beginning of the 17th century, the Tsardome of Moscow suffered a catastrophe, known as the Time of Troubles, and during the reign of Romanov dynasty, the enslavement of the peasantry intensified, which aggravated social struggles and led to numerous popular uprisings (such as one led by Stenka Razin). The question of how far the folklore about Ivan IV can be considered to reflect popular sixteenth-century attitudes towards him, rather than a retrospective idealization, is highly debatable. The image created throughout Russian folklore is in a direct contrast to that which is typically painted of him and his rule by historians. As folklorist Jack V. Haney claims speaking about the stories of Ivan the Terrible and Peter the Great: "Though the chief character is certainly a historical figure, the resemblance stops here, for there is nothing historical, or even very plausible, in most of these legends.”.

By studying a variety of folktales about Ivan the Terrible Maureen Perrie states that “in so far as he is the friend of the common people, and the enemy of the boyars, he (Ivan IV) is seen as a ‘good’ tsar”, despite the fact that because of his hot temper, he does injustice and executes the innocents. This is attributed to "evil people" who bear false witness, or to his excessive zeal to eliminate a treason. Consequently, the image depicted of Ivan is not one in which he is a “meaningless, bloodletting” ruler, but rather he is kind and compassionate towards his lower subjects. By creating the tsar to be either a friend of the commoners or an enemy to the boyar, a positive image of Ivan IV is represented through the particular folktale.

Maureen concludes that Ivan deliberately formed this image of "just tsar" among the lower classes through demagogy and populism, declaring his killed political opponents "robbers of the common people." This made worse the situation in the Time of Troubles, when a predictable transition was made in the minds from the "traitor-boyars" to the "false tsar".

== Friend of the people ==
Primarily, throughout folktales, the tsar is typically described as an “ally and protector of the ordinary people against their common enemies, and especially the boyars”. One example of a folktale in which the tsar befriends the commoner can be found in Samuel Collins’ recording. In this story, a friendship develops between a disguised Ivan and a thief. Eventually the thief asks the tsar if he wants to go robbing with him and the tsar agrees. After they had robbed from a few shops in the marketplace, the tsar wanted to test his new friend’s loyalty and suggests that they rob the treasury. At this suggestion, the thief slaps the tsar saying that "I’ve been thieving for ages, but I’ve never dreamt of robbing the tsar!". The story continues that the thief suggests that instead of robbing the tsar, the two should rob the boyars because “they get their money for nothing”. For his faithfulness and respect for the tsar, Ivan rewards the young man by asking him to become his counselor.

This tale exemplifies a story in which the tsar befriends a common peasant. Collins’ tale also provides us evidence that the folklore regarding Ivan the Terrible often shows him heroically allying with those of the lower classes against the sly and devious middle and upper class citizens. By agreeing to help the thief rob the boyar, the tsar is ultimately legitimizing the thief's actions. Continually, Maureen Perrie justifies the formation of the friendship between the tsar and the thief because “the tsar endorses the values and attitudes of the representative of the people, and demonstrates that he has more in common with them than with the boyars”. Consequently, the image depicted of Ivan is not one in which he is a “meaningless, bloodletting” ruler, but rather he is kind and compassionate towards his lower subjects.

But in another story, also recorded by Collins, Ivan burns the entire village of "ordinary" people in order to teach them how bad it is to be homeless in the middle of winter (they did not let him in when disguised Ivan was looking for housing a day earlier).

== Enemy of the Boyar ==
The second way a positive image of Ivan was created through folklore can be found by looking at examples that show Ivan was “an enemy of the boyar”. Through tales such as “The Potter”, we see how the tsar was often depicted as siding with the commoner against the boyars and other aristocratic individuals. Throughout “The Potter” a friendship develops between Ivan and a common potter. The tsar is attracted to the potter because of his ability to answer riddles. Because the tsar is impressed by his quick wittedness, he vows that, “if you (referring to the potter) stick to me, and I’ll stick to you”. Consequently, the tsar helps this potter create a monopoly against the other boyars over the pottery sales in Russia. When an un-suspecting boyar is unable to pay for the merchandise he ordered, the tsar punishes him by making the boyar switch social roles with the potter.

Through this story we see that a friendship between the tsar and the potter develops out of the mutual dislike of the boyars. We are also provided with evidence that the tsar is more willing to help the common potter than he is the boyar. In addition, the tsar is attracted to the potter's quick wittedness and consequently he was more willing to help the witty man from the lower social classes than he was the “stupid” middle- upper class boyars. Finally, this story is an example of Haney's claim that through many folktales, Ivan is depicted as a “resolute but compassionate and an enlightened ruler, anxious to protect the peasants from the landowners, and he goes to some extraordinary lengths to do so”.

As the above examples of folklore show, a positive image of Ivan the Terrible can be found whenever a folktale has Ivan either a friend to a common peasant or an enemy to the boyar. There are a few reasons that folklorists provide us with that explain why this positive image of Ivan IV was created throughout Russian folklore. One valid reason is that the common people did not see Ivan's actions as negative- he was simply doing his job as the tsar. They believed that it was the tsar's responsibility to protect his country, and he should do whatever it takes to accomplish that obligation.

In addition, because the tsar was seen as their only benefactor, the peasants often would not like to ridicule or satirize the tsar because they feared upsetting him. They hoped to create and tell stories about Ivan IV that would be pleasing to him, which would build a better relationship between the tsar and the “commoners.” In addition, these stories also created the “ideal tsar” that many Russians hoped would run their country someday. Ivan IV was, for many of the peasants, the only figure of authority they knew and they did not know any other type of ruling. Consequently, the folklore “represents an artistic response to a historical event or character, and, in the case of a historical figure such as Ivan”.

== See also ==
- Vlad the Impaler
- Richard I of England
- Russian political jokes
