= Fateh Ezatpoor =

Iranian artist (born 1958)

- Born: 1958 (age 67–68); Sanandaj, Iran
- Occupation: Calligraphist
- Website: Official website

Fateh Ezatpoor (or Ezzatpour فاتح_عزت‌پور Persian: فاتح عزت پور), son of Ahmad, born in 1958, is a calligraphist, illuminated manuscript artist, university professor, and researcher.

== Early life ==
Ezatpoor is from the Jorabad quarter of the city of Sanandaj. He was introduced to the art of calligraphy at the age of 10 or 11 by his uncle, Mehdi Kamali Kordestani. His uncle supervised Ezatpoor's practice of basic Nastaliq calligraphy. In 1978, Ezatpoor went to Tehran to earn his bachelor's degree from Allameh Tabatabai University.

== Education and Career ==
=== Iranian Calligraphists Association ===
In 1979, while earning his bachelor's degree in Economic Sciences from Allameh Tatatabai University, Ezatpoor simultaneously enrolled at the Iranian Calligraphists Association. He began his studies under Abbas Akhavein. Akhavein was a well-known Nastaliq calligrapher at the time who would later go on to design the Kelk calligraphy software based on the Nastaliq script.

Though Ezatpoor had begun his calligraphic education with Nastaliq, he became interested in Shekaste script ("broken" cursive calligraphy) during his formal calligraphy studies. Starting in 1980, he studied Shekaste under Yadollah Kaboli Khansari.

In 1982, Ezatpoor received his certificate of calligraphy with distinction from the Iranian Calligraphists Association. After receiving his certificate, he was recruited as an instructor and began to teach calligraphy.

=== Illuminated manuscript work ===
Around 1983, Ezatpoor spent several years learning the traditional art of tazhib, or illumination, from graphic designer Buyuk Ahmari. Ahmari was one of the pioneers of graphic design and commercial illustration in Iran. Ezatpoor incorporated tazhib illumination into his own work and teaching.

=== Exhibition judgeships ===
Ezatpoor has served in multiple events as a judge throughout his career. He was the international judge/mentor for the Calligraphy Contest conducted in Georgian National Center of Manuscripts on 2012, has been a part of all annual World of Islam international exhibitions on professor's exhibitions, and served as a judge for all Bi-Annual Persian Calligraphy conferences. Ezatpoor's mentorship events and exhibitions have been throughout the region including Georgia (country), Iraqi Kurdistan, and throughout Iran, including Tehran (Reza Abbasi Museum, Art Gallery, Saba Gallery), Isfahan, Qeshm, and Sanandaj.

=== Recognition and honors ===
In 2009, Ezatpoor was one of the first artists in Iran that received the Certificate of Grade I (equal to Doctoral Honorary Degree) from the Ministry of Sciences, Researchers and Technology for his outstanding artistic work and experience.

== Works published ==
During his artistic career, Ezatpoor has prepared and published many articles and educational pamphlets to promote the art of calligraphy. Ezatpoor has published more than 14 books and some have been republished for more than 40 times.

Name of book	Year of publication	Publisher	City, country
Penmanship in Kurdistan	1983	Department of Islamic Guidance and Culture	Sanandaj, Iran
Rubaiyat of Omar Khayyam	1983	Forough	Tehran, Iran
Baba Tahir Orian	1984	Forough	Tehran, Iran
Divan-E-Hafez (Ghani Ghazvini Version)	1985	Gotanbarg	Tehran, Iran
Monajat Khwaja Abdullah Ansari	1986	Mohammad	Tehran, Iran
Golestan-E-Saadi Shirazi	1986	Partoo	Tehran, Iran
Abū-Sa'īd Abul-Khayr	1988	Mohammad	Tehran, Iran
Divan-E-Hafez (Ghodsi Version)	1988	Pirasteh	Tehran, Iran
Rubaiyat of Omar Khayyam	1989	Partoo	Tehran, Iran
Hatef Esfahani	1990	Mohammad	Tehran, Iran
Kurdish Version of Rubaiyat of Omar Khayyam (Translated by Hajar - Abdurrahman Sharafkandi)	1990	Ready to be published	-
Parvin E'tesami	1991	Pirasteh	Sanandaj, Iran
Basic Calligraphy ( Instructional Pamphlet )	1992	Ezatpoor Art Association	Sanandaj, Iran
Calligraphy in Traditional Arts	2009	University for Applied Sciences and Technology	Sanandaj, Iran

In addition to artistic activities, he has served as an expert in the field of housing in Iran. To date, he has presented and published more than forty articles in scientific journals and seminars organized by the Ministry of Housing and Urban Development.

== Professional roles ==
- Professor of Iranian Calligraphists Association from 1982
- Professor in artistic and scientific fields including teaching at Islamic Azad University, University of Applied Sciences and Technology, and the Center for Public Administration from 1989
- Nationwide referee in the field of calligraphy, and member of the council for diagnosis and revising examination papers at Iranian Calligraphists Association from 1983.
- Teaching at Reza Abbasi Museum and Khayam Library located in Park Khayam, Tehran
- Teaching at artistic centers for private institutes in Tehran and Sanandaj.
- Referee of provincial competitions including students competitions, and calligraphy exhibitions of the provincial universities and technical and vocational high schools.
- Instructing fine penmanship at calligraphy classes and teaching civil servants.
- Founder and instructor at his artistic work office, Ezatpoor Art Association
