= Alexander Lvovich Kazembek =

Russian émigré and political activist (1902–1977)

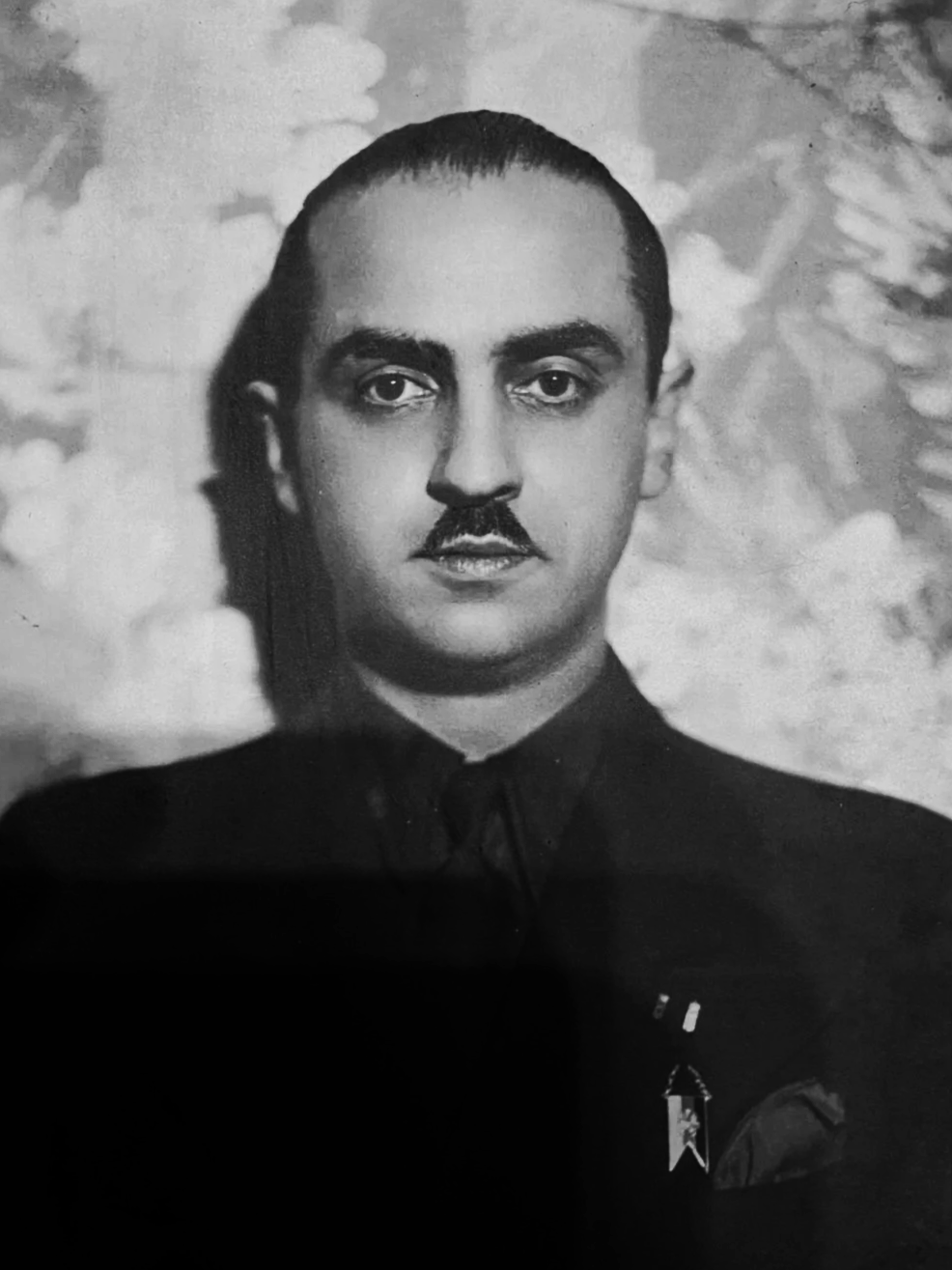
- Born: February 15, 1902; Kazan, Russian Empire
- Died: February 21, 1977 (aged 75); Moscow, Soviet Union
- Occupations: Politician, publicist, journalist, theologian
- Known for: Leader of the Mladorossi
- Family: Kazembek family

Alexander Lvovich Kazembek (Russian: Алекса́ндр Льво́вич Казембе́к, or Казем-Бек; French: Alexandre Kasem-Beg; 15 February [O.S. 2 February] 1902 – 21 February 1977), often spelled Kazem-Bek or Kasem-Beg, was a Russian émigré and political activist, and founder of the Mladorossi political group.

== Life ==
Kazembek was born in Kazan into a wealthy noble family. His great-grandfather Alexander Kasimovich Kazembek was a prominent Russian scholar, member of the Russian Academy of Sciences and the British Royal Asiatic Society to whom The Cambridge History of Russia refers as "a Dagestani Persian of Shi‘i origin". Robert P. Geraci refers to his great-grandfather as "an Azeri who converted to Christianity." The Archival Collections of Columbia University Libraries refers to Kazembek himself as born "into an old noble family of Persian (Azeri) origin". Brill's Christian-Muslim Relations series refers to his great-grandfather as being born "to a prominent Iranian family from the Caucasus", and having a father who was an "Azerbaijani Muslim cleric".

After the October Revolution and the White Army's loss of Povolzhye and Siberia, the Kazembeks emigrated to Belgrade, where Kazembek finished secondary school, and later to Munich. In 1925, Kazembek graduated from the Institut d'études politiques de Paris and started working at a credit union in Monte Carlo, Monaco. In 1929, he returned to Paris and was already a famous political activist within Europe's Russian community. In the 1920s, Kazembek founded the Mladorossi. His charismatic persona, clear ideas and oratorical abilities led to strong support of his leadership by many White émigrés.

Like many other expatriate Russian political organizations in the decades World War II, the Mladorossi sought the restoration of the monarchy in Russia. In addition, other main goals were to meet the needs of the poor and to preserve some of the contemporary ruling methods in the Soviet Union but without dismissing traditional values and institutions. Kazembek placed great emphasis on the role of the Russian Orthodox Church, which was being persecuted by Joseph Stalin. Some regarded the idea as utopic and an oxymoron and so West often saw the Mladorossi as Soviet agents, but in the Soviet Union, they were presented as nationalists and imperialists.

Kazembek's political popularity started to decline after it was revealed that he had held meetings with a number of Soviet officials trying to recruit him into collaboration. In 1940, he was arrested and detained in a concentration camp, but he was soon released and moved to San Francisco, California, where he worked as a columnist for the Russian-language newspaper Novaya Zarya and assisted the YMCA in providing help to the Russian hostages in German camps. Thus, the Mladorossi was proclaimed officially dismissed by 1942. Between 1944 and 1957, Kazembek taught the Russian language and literature at Yale University and Connecticut College. He was also deeply involved in religious work and co-operated with various Russian Orthodox organizations in North America. In 1954, while he was visiting New Delhi, Kazembek applied for permission to return to the Soviet Union permanently.

== Political views ==
Kazembek was sympathetic towards Stalin in the 1930s, but had some reservations, particularly after the purge of Mikhail Tukhachevsky. Similar to Trotsky he believed Stalin to be a Bonapartist, however, unlike Trotsky he admired this. Kazembek believed that Stalin should serve alongside a monarch, specifically Grand Duke Kiril Vladimirovich of Russia, who had ties with the Nazis.

In 1957, his reputation suffered a blow when Pravda published a pro-Soviet article and claimed Kazembek as its author. He demanded immediate rehabilitation from the newspaper and threatened to commit suicide if his demands were not met. In 1957, his request of the Soviet citizenship was sustained. He returned to the Soviet Union and worked at the Moscow Patriarchate's Department of Exterior Affairs until his death in 1977. He was buried in the village of Lukino, a Moscow suburb, near the local Church of the Transfiguration.

== Sources ==
- Massip, Mireille. Alexandre Kasem-Beg et l'émigration russe en Occident, 1902-1977. Georg Editeur S.A., Paris: 1999
