= David Schimmelpenninck van der Oye =

Canadian historian (1957–2022)

- Born: Dutch: David Hendrick Schimmelpenninck van der Oye; 1957; Netherlands
- Died: March 14, 2022 (aged 64–65); Canada
- Citizenship: Canada
- Scientific career
- Thesis: Ex Oriente Lux: Ideologies of Empire and Russia’s Far East, 1895–1904 (1997)

David Hendrick Schimmelpenninck van der Oye, FRSC, KStJ (/shɪməljpænjɪnək/; 1957–2022), was a Canadian historian who was a professor of the history of Russia at Brock University. He also was a member of the Canadian Association of Slavists.

== Biography ==
Schimmelpenninck van der Oye was born in the Netherlands in 1957. On his mother's side he was of Russian descent: his grandfather fled the country as part of the White Army under the command of Pyotr Wrangel in 1921. In 1967 David moved in Canada. As a child, he had a dream of one day becoming a diplomat, but subsequent military service as a Canadian Army reservist made him extremely skeptical of public service.

In 1982 Schimmelpenninck van der Oye entered in the finance world. He worked in Midland Doherty Ltd, Toronto (1982–1985) and in Enskilda Securities, London (1988–1989) and at the same time received a higher education in Russian history in Yale University. From 1989 Schimmelpenninck van der Oye worked in Brock University. In 1997 David graduated from this university with a PhD. degree with the thesis Ex Oriente Lux: Ideologies of Empire and Russia’s Far East, 1895–1904. In 2015 he was elected in the Royal Society of Canada.

In 2016, Schimmelpenninck van der Oye found himself at the centre of a sex scandal when his student, who wished to remain anonymous, complained to CBC News that two years ago he invited her and a male student to drink alcohol. Later, when he was alone with her, he made her a sexual proposal, but the girl immediately refused. David was later suspended from teaching, but returned to teaching in 2019.

Schimmelpenninck van der Oye died at the age of 64 on 14 March 2022.

== Selected works ==
- Schimmelpenninck van der Oye, David (2001). Toward the Rising Sun: Russian Ideologies of Empire and the Path to War with Japan. NIU Series in Slavic, East European, and Eurasian Studies. DeKalb: Northern Illinois University Press. ISBN 978-0-875-80276-3. (about of the causes of the Russo-Japanese War, translated into Russian)
- — (2002). "The Russo-Japanese War". In Kagan, Frederick W.; Higham, Robin (eds.). The Military History of Tsarist Russia. New York City: Palgrave Macmillan, a division of Nature America, Inc. pp. 183–201. doi:10.1007/978-0-230-10822-6. ISBN 978-0-312-22635-0.
- — (2002). "Restricted Access «To Build a Great Russia»: Civil-Military Relations in the Third Duma, 1907–12". In Lohr, Eric; Poe, Marshall (eds.). The Military and Society in Russia, 1450–1917. Leiden and Boston: Brill. pp. 293–321. doi:10.1163/9789047401070_019. ISBN 978-90-04-12273-4.
- — (2006). "Russian foreign policy, 1815—1917". In Lieven, Dominic (ed.). The Cambridge History of Russia. Vol. 2, Imperial Russia, 1689–1917. Cambridge: Cambridge University Press. pp. 554–575. ISBN 978-0-521-81529-1.
- — Steinberg, John W.; Menning, Bruce W.; Wolff, David; Yokote, Shinji, eds. (2006). The Russo-Japanese War in Global Perspective: World War Zero. Leiden and Boston: Brill. doi:10.1163/ej.9789004154162.i-583.2. ISBN 978-9-004-14284-8.
- — Atroshchenko, Olʹga; Bagdami︠a︡n, Irina; Bulatov, V. Ė. (2010). Russia's Unknown Orient: Orientalist Paintings 1850–1920. Rotterdam / Oostkamp: NAi Uitgevers / Publishers Stichting. ISBN 978-9-056-62762-1 – via the Internet Archive.
- — Betteley, Marie (2020). Beyond Fabergé: Imperial Russian Jewelry. Atglen, PA: Schiffer Publishing. ISBN 978-0-764-36043-5.
- — (2021). Russian Orientalism: Asia in the Russian Mind from Peter the Great to the Emigration. New Heaven: Yale University Press. ISBN 978-0-300-16289-9. JSTOR j.ctt1nq5fp. ('In this highly original and controversial book, David Schimmelpenninck van der Oye examines Russian thinking about the Orient before the Revolution of 1917', translated into Russian)

== Bibliography ==
- Thurston, Patricia K. (1998). "Doctoral Dissertations on Russia, the Soviet Union, Central Asia, and Eastern Europe Accepted by Universities in the United States, Canada, and Britain, 1997". Slavic Review. 57 (4). New York City: Cambridge University Press and Association for Slavic, East European, and Eurasian Studies: 954–971. doi:10.1017/S0037677900052761. ISSN 0037-6779. JSTOR 2501111.
