= Reza Abbasi Museum =

Museum in Tehran, Iran

- موزه رضا عباسی
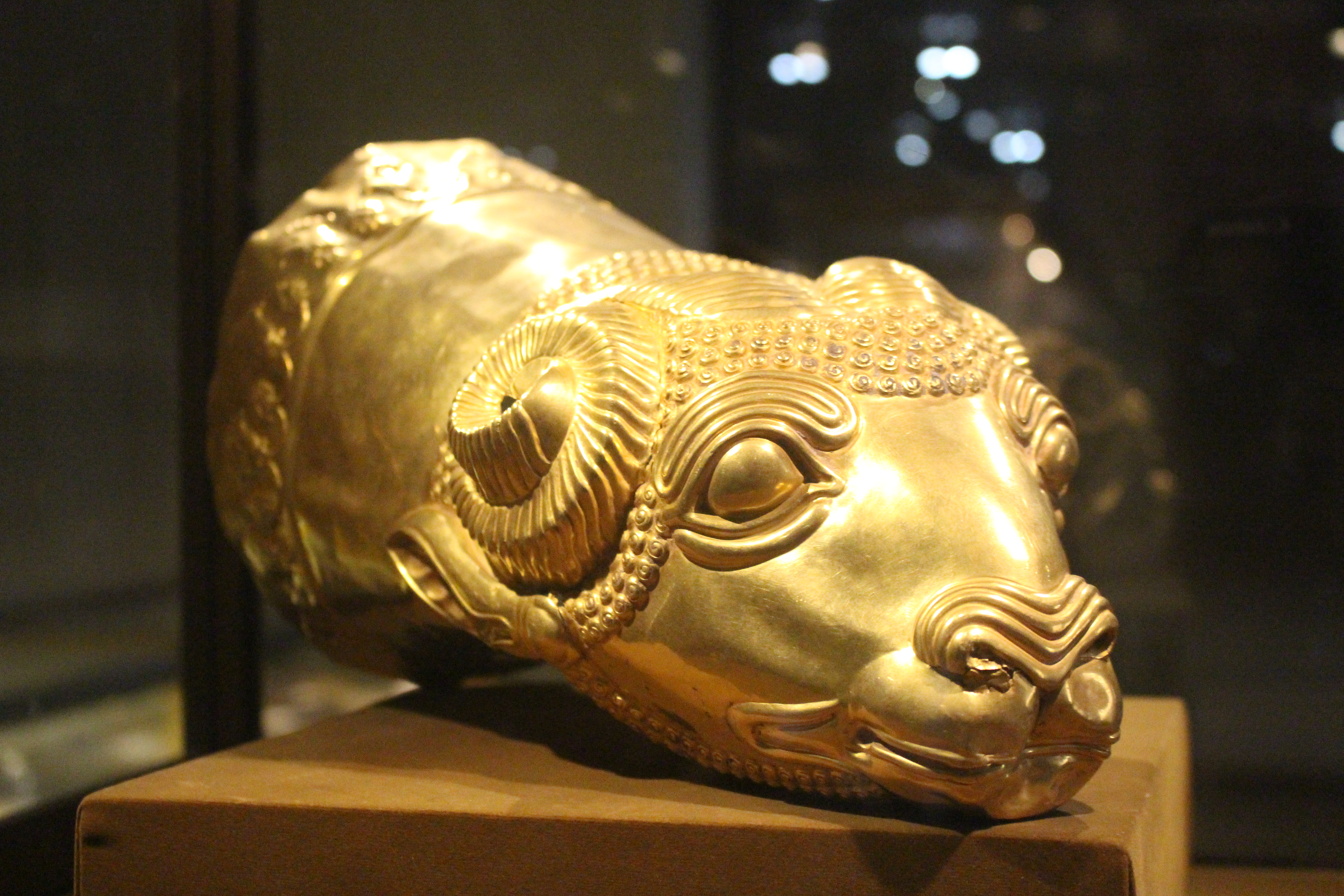
- Golden rhyton of ram's head, the most important artifact from the Medians era, 7-6th century BC, located in Reza Abbasi Museum

- Location within Tehran
- Established: 1977; 49 years ago
- Location: Seyed Khandan; Tehran; Iran
- Coordinates: 35°44′28″N 51°26′47″E
- Type: Art museum
- Website: www.rezaabbasimuseum.ir

The Reza Abbasi Museum (Persian: موزه رضا عباسی ) is a museum in Tehran, Iran, located in Seyed Khandan. The museum is named after Reza Abbasi, one of the artists of the Safavid Empire. The Reza Abbasi Museum is home to a unique collection of Persian art dating back to the second millennium BC, from both the pre-Islamic and Islamic eras.

== History ==
The museum was officially opened in September 1977 under the guidance of Shahbanu Farah Pahlavi, but was closed in November 1978. It was reopened a year later in 1979, with some changes in its internal decorations and further expansion of its exhibition space. It was closed again in 1984 due to internal difficulties and reopened a year later. It was finally opened for the fifth time, after its renovation on 4 February 2000. The museum is currently administrated by the Cultural Heritage Organization of Iran.

== Collections ==
The collections of the museum belong to a period from the 7th millennium BC to the early 20th century. The displays are arranged chronologically. Objects on display include artifacts made of baked clay, metal and stone from the pre historic times to pottery and metal objects, textile and lacquer painting, manuscripts and jewelry belonging to the Islamic period.

== Library ==
The museum's library possesses over 10,000 Persian, English, French and German books about Persian art, history, archaeology and classical paintings.

== Publication department ==
The publication department has published many books regarding Iranian arts and collections.

== Training courses ==
There are also different training courses in the museum such as Drawing, Calligraphy, Watercolor and Oil painting.

== Burning of documents ==
In May 2015 various documents of the museum which were mostly communications with Shahbanu Farah Diba's office before the 1979 Islamic Revolution were burned. The issue was revealed by Mehr News Agency in Tehran and created a lot of criticism in Persian-language media and social networks.

== The collection of silver coins ==
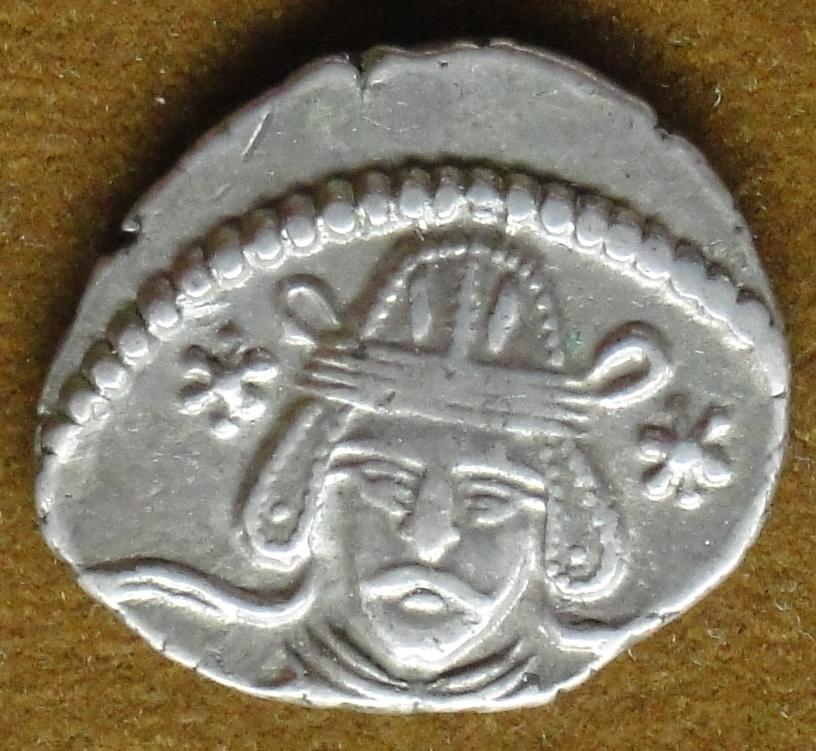
Vonones II of Parthia

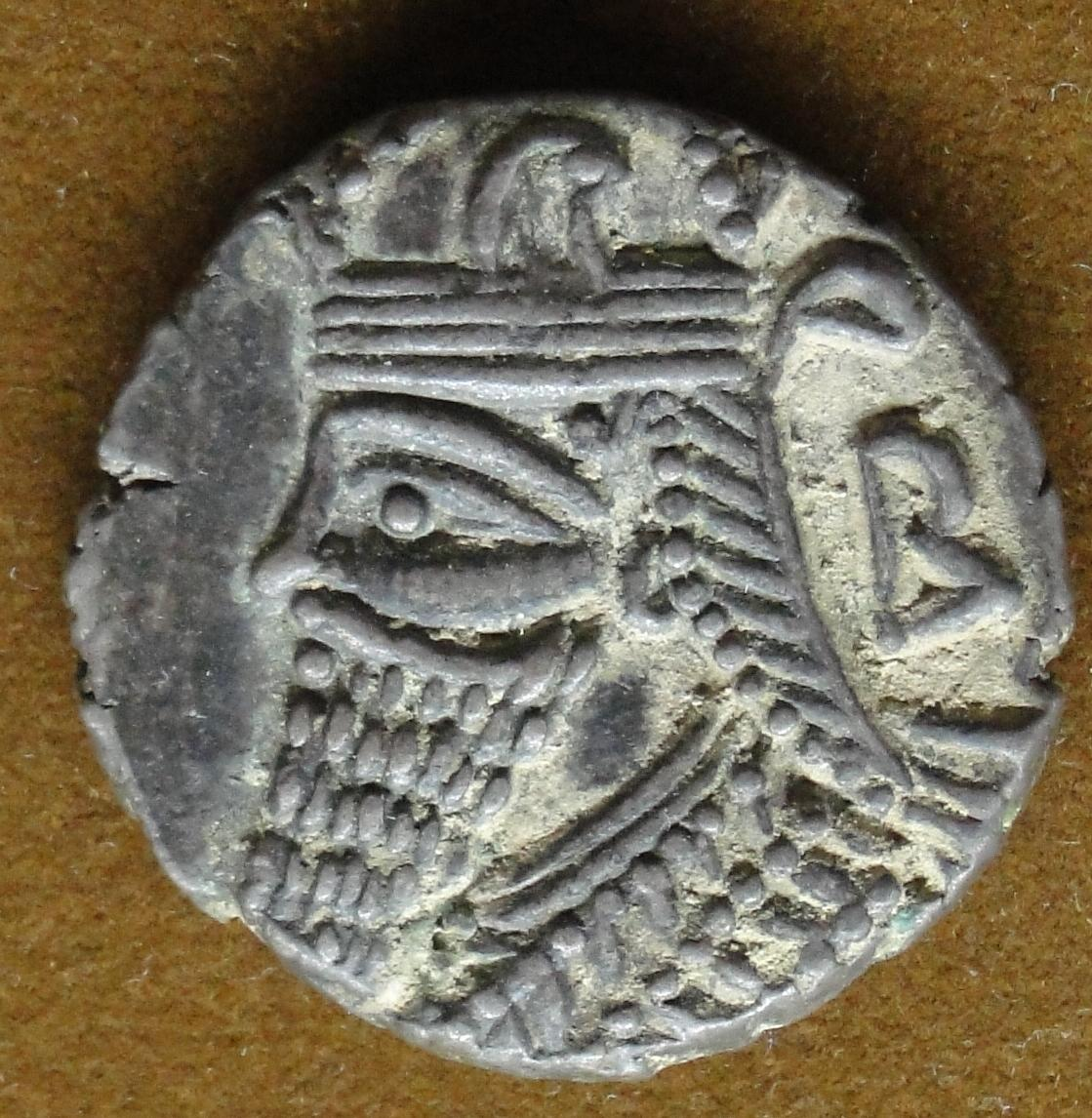
Vologases V of Parthia

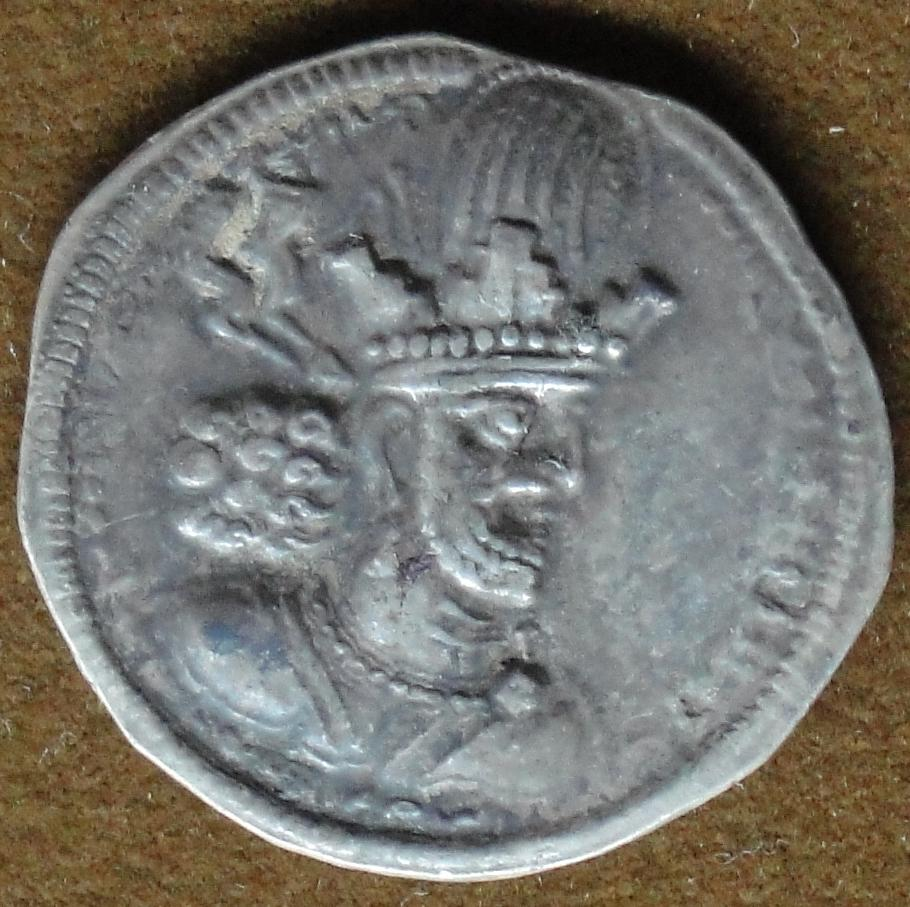
Shapur II

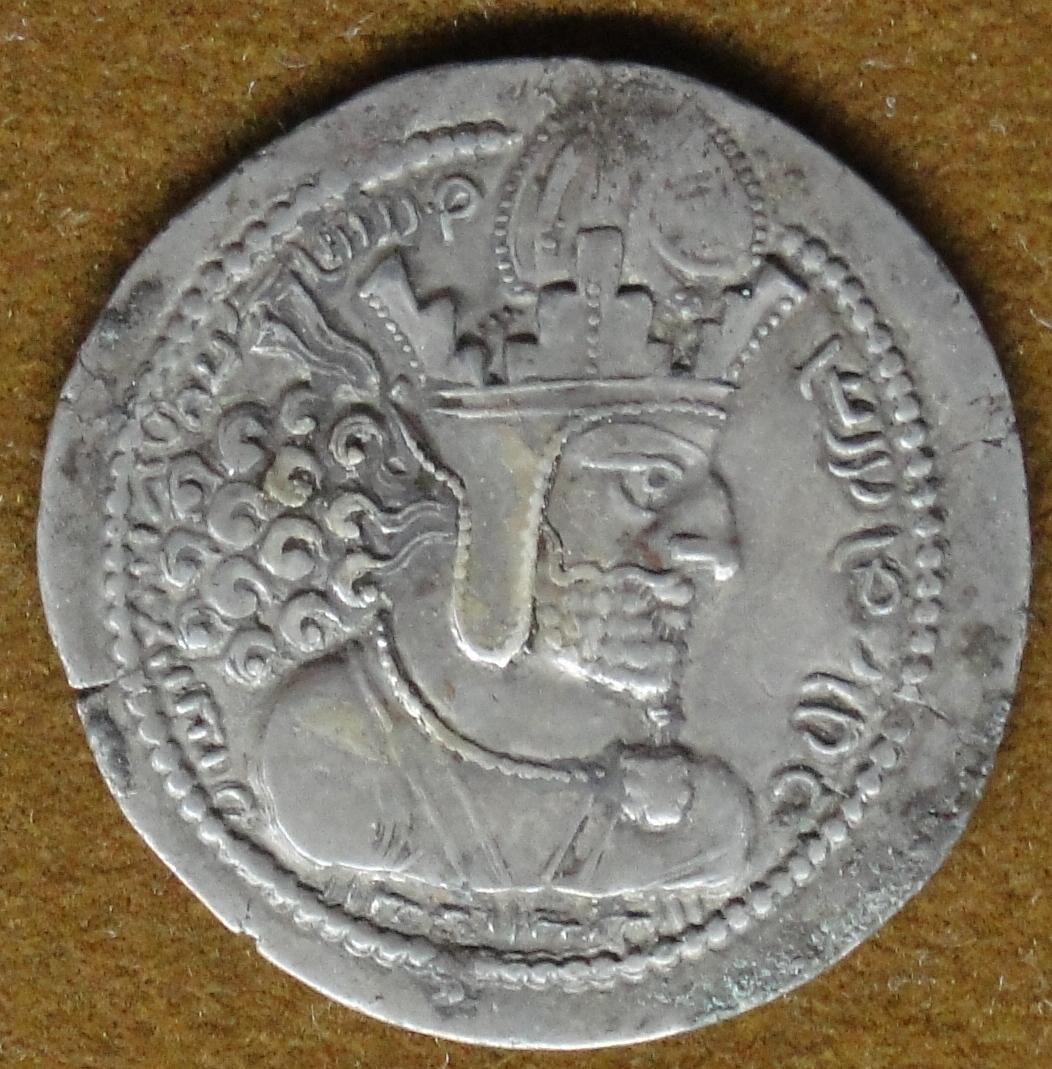
Shapur I

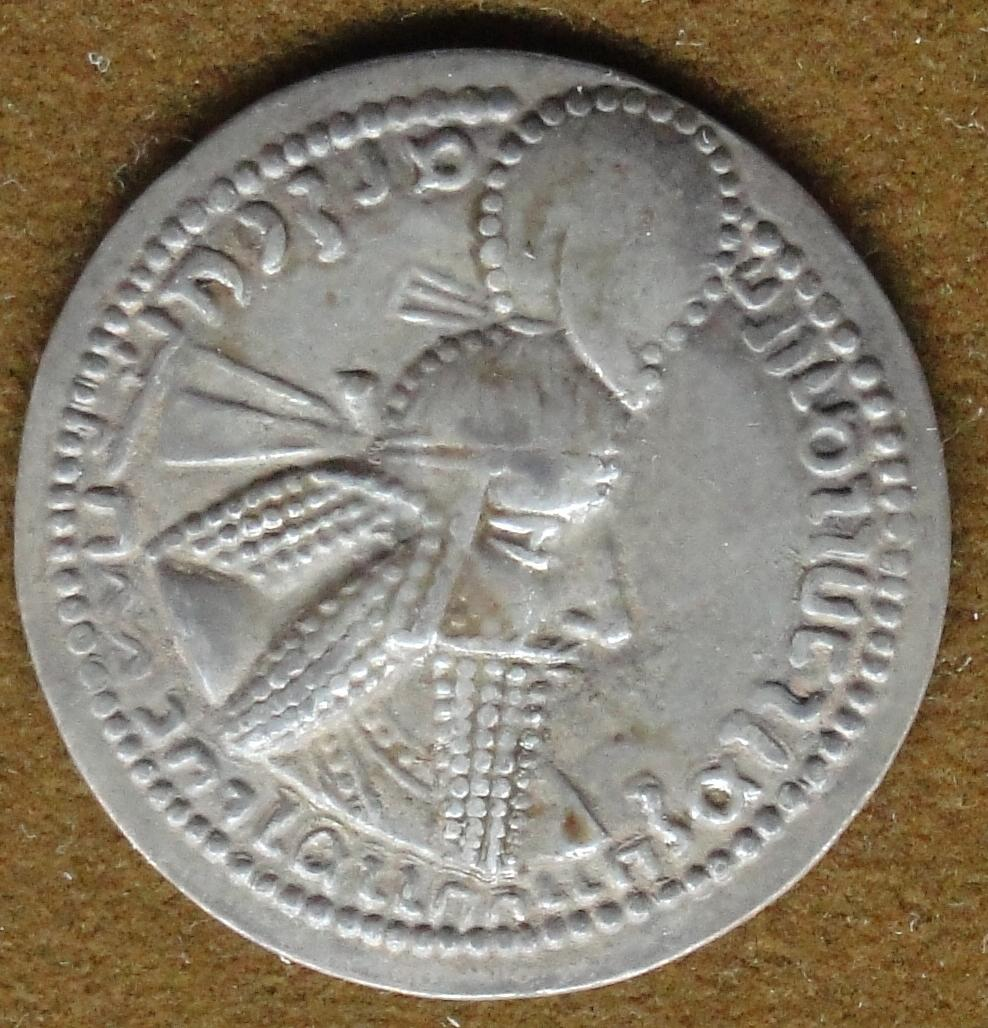
Ardashir I

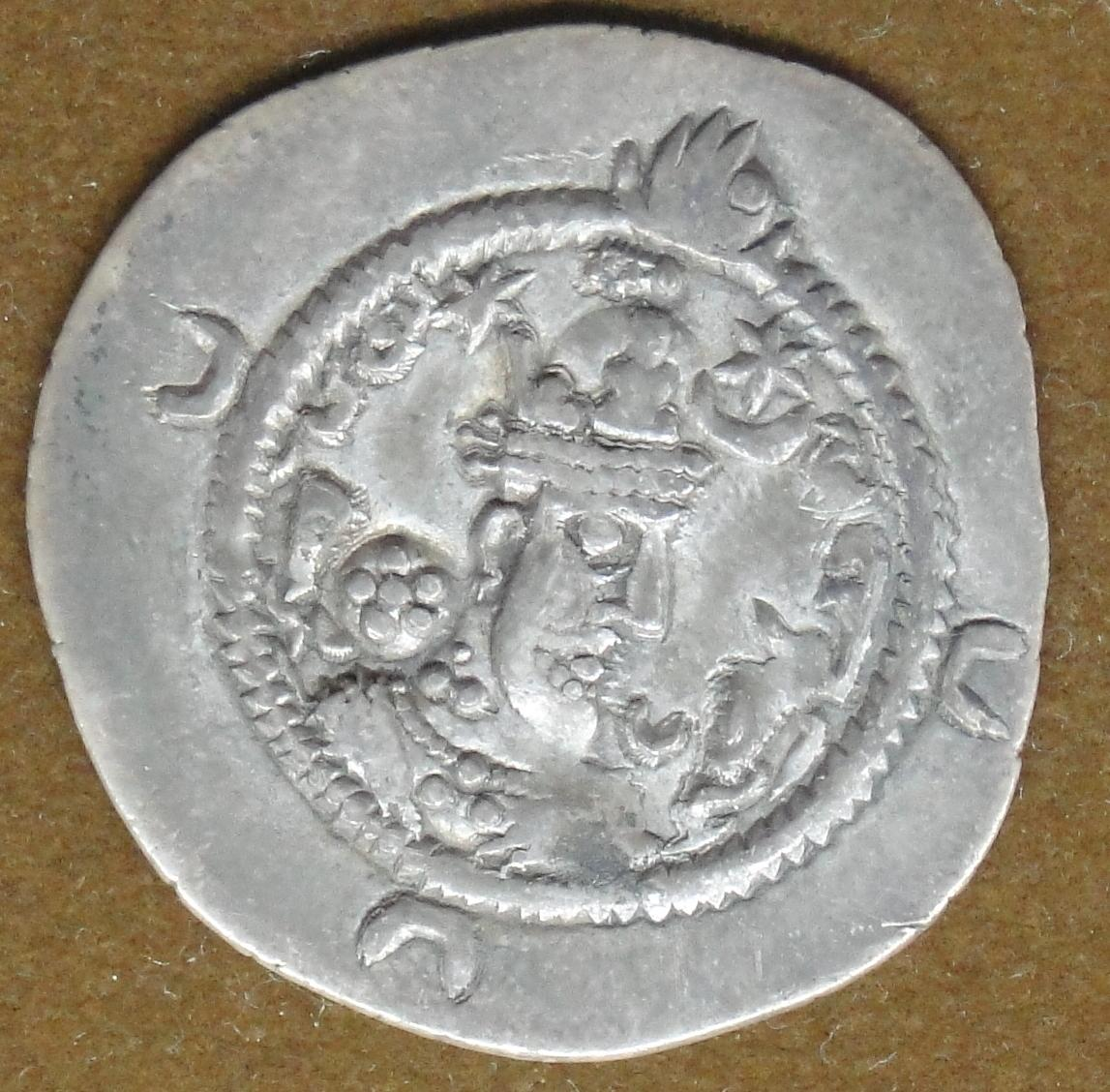
Ardashir III

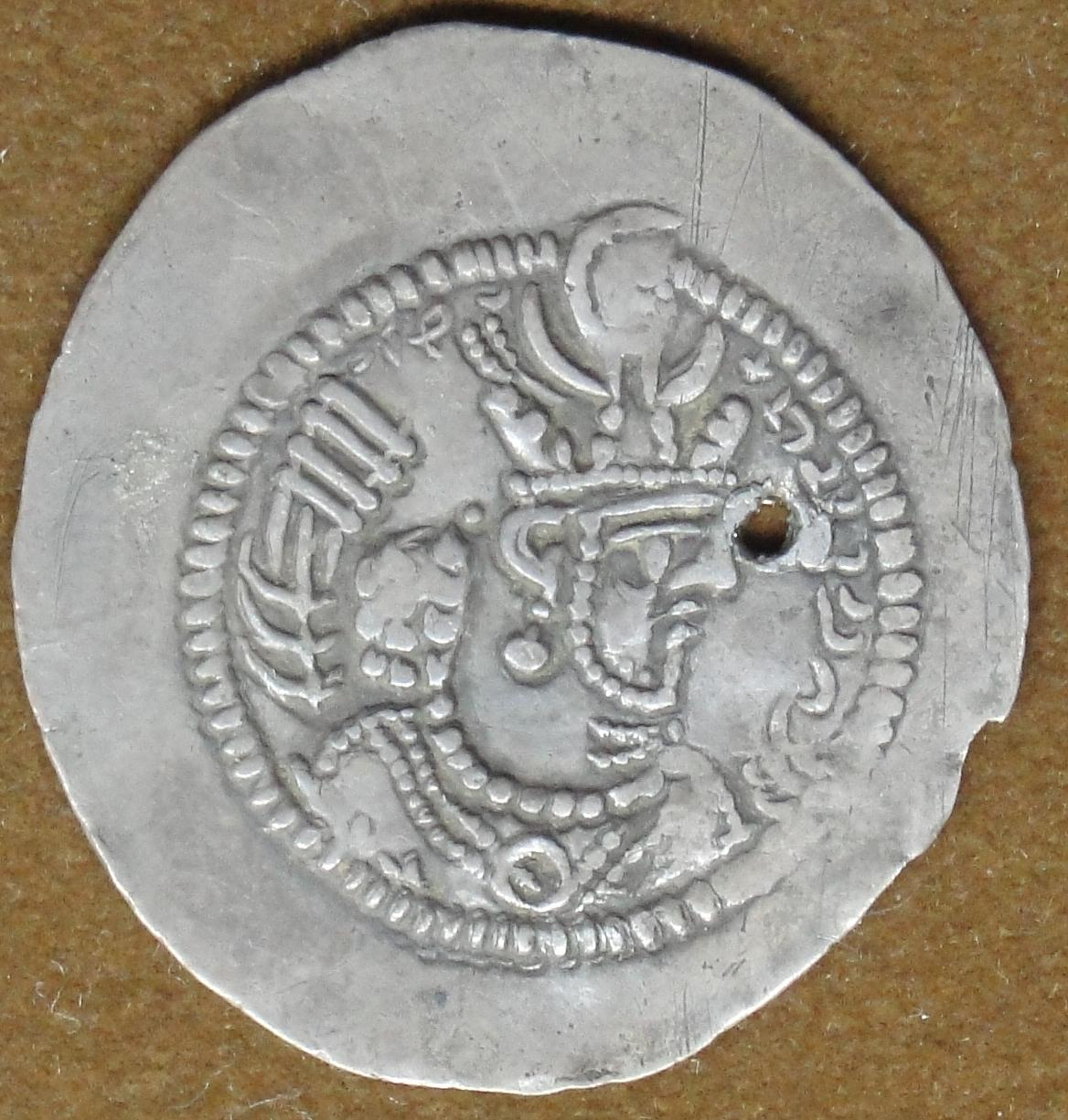
Bahram V

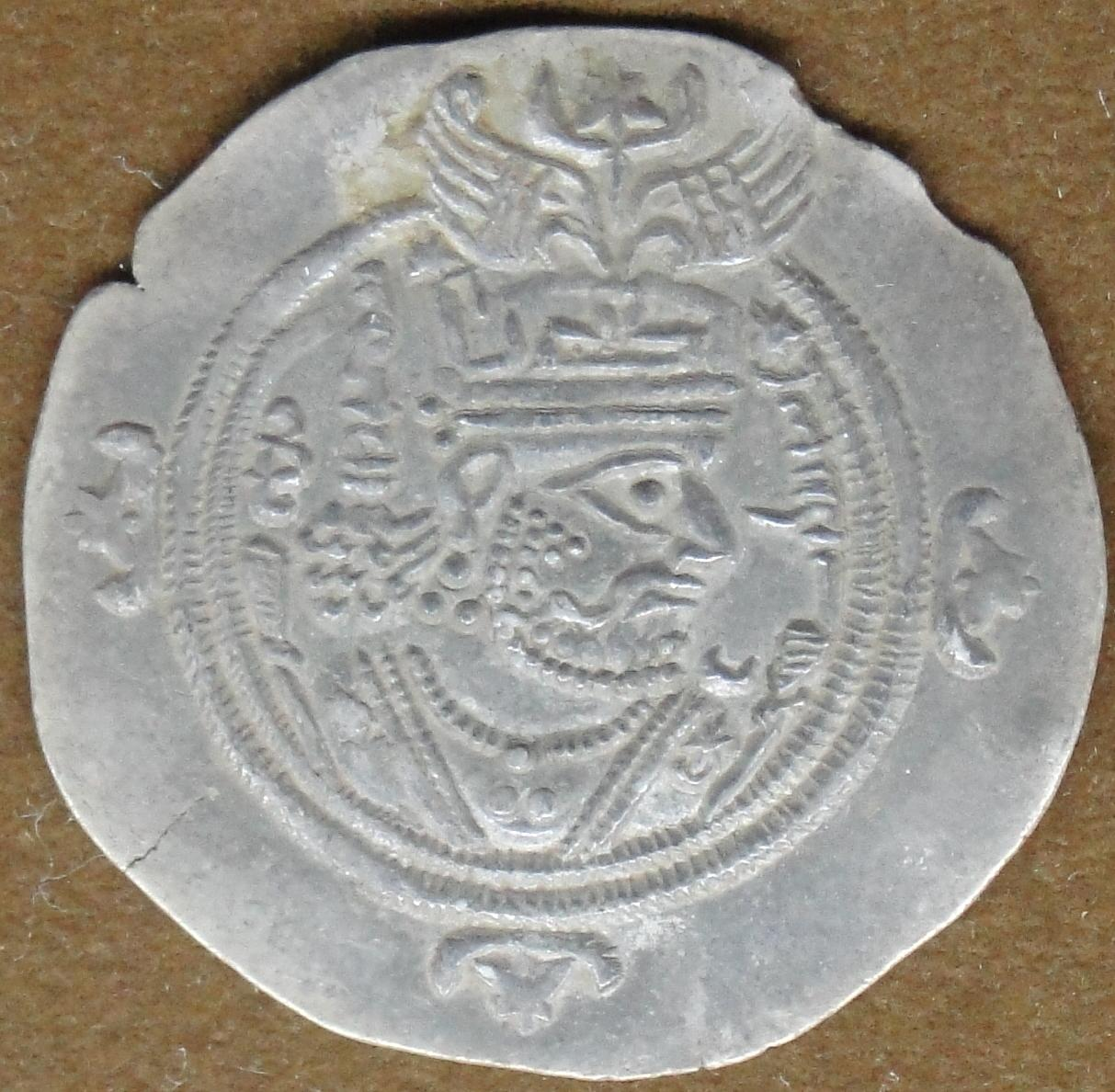
Hormizd IV

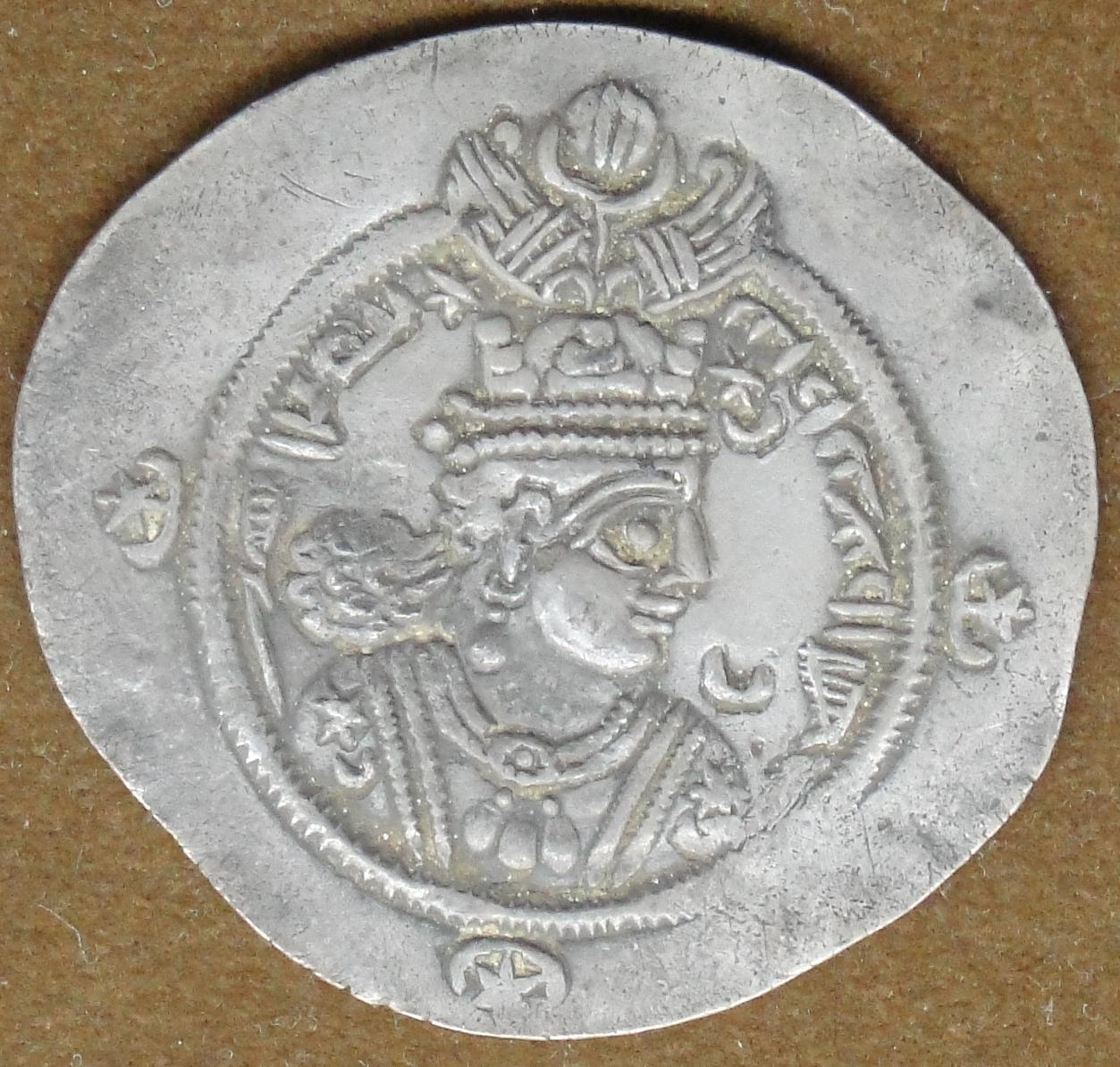
Khosrau I

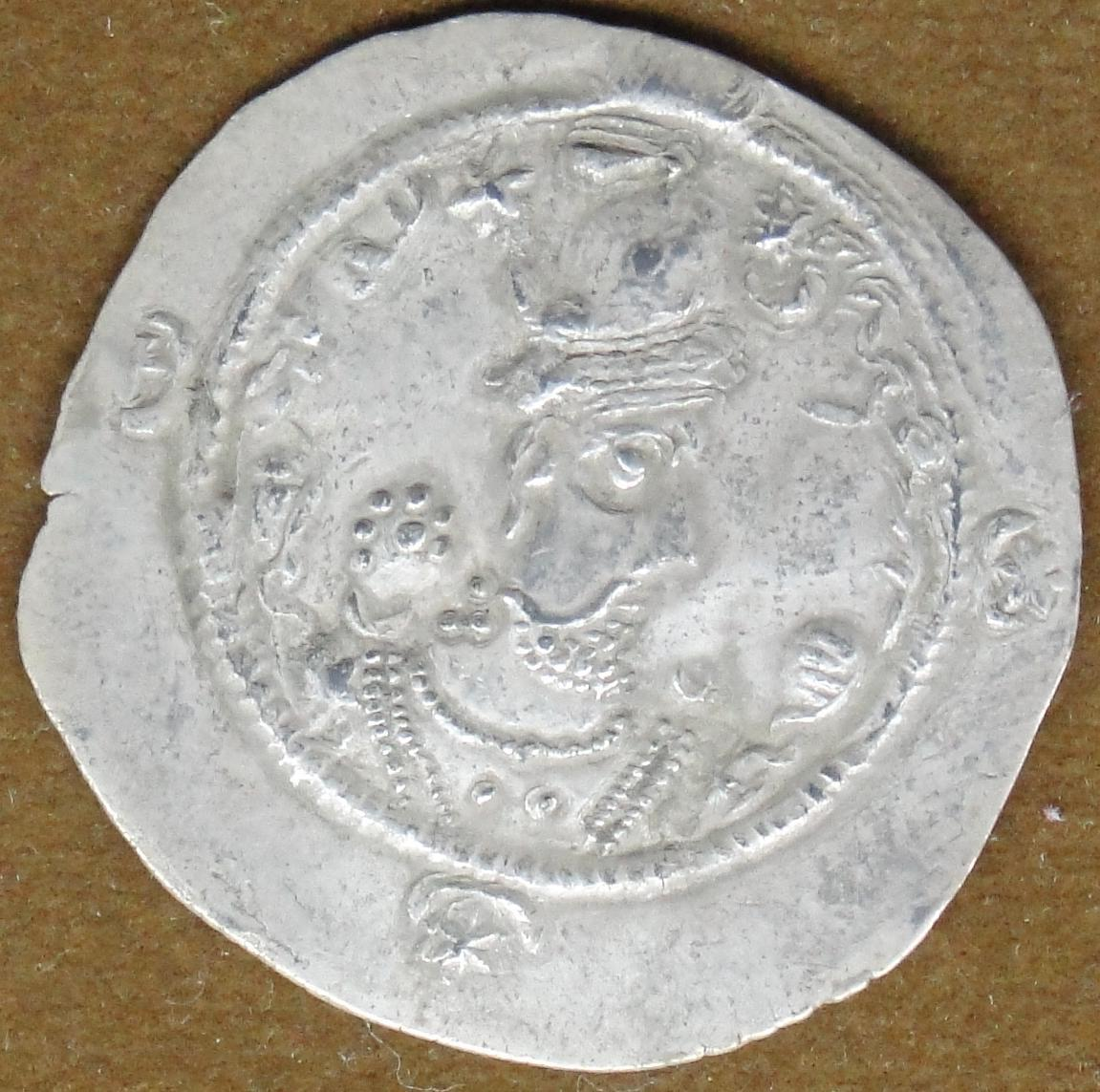
Khosrau II
