= Maureen Perrie =

British historian

Maureen Perrie (born 1946) is a British historian, Professor Emeritus of Russian History at the University of Birmingham, and a lecturer in Russian History at the centre for Russian and East European Studies at the University of Birmingham.

== Career ==
The main focus of Perrie's research and studies has been Russian history from the sixteenth to the twentieth century. She is one of the editors of the three-volume The Cambridge History of Russia. In addition, from 2001 to 2004, Perrie served as president of the British Association for Slavonic and East European Studies (BASEES). She is currently serving as the vice-president of BASEES.

== Works ==
=== Books ===
- The Agrarian Policy of the Russian Socialist- Revolutionary Party: from its Origins through the Revolution of 1905-1907, 1976
- The Image of Ivan the Terrible in Russian Folklore, 1987
- Pretenders and Popular Monarchism in Early Modern Russia: the False Tsars of the Time of Troubles, 1995
- The Cult of Ivan the Terrible in Stalin’s Russia, 2001
- (with Andrei Pavlov) Ivan the Terrible, 2003
- (ed.) Cambridge History of Russia. Cambridge: Cambridge University Press, 2006. 3 vols.

=== Articles ===
- "Folklore as Evidence of Peasant Mentalite"
- "The Sovialist Revolution"
- "Correspondence"
- "The Russian Peasant Movement of 1905-1907: Its Social Composition and Revolutionary Significance"
