= Seyed Khandan =

Neighborhood in Tehran, Iran

Coordinates: 35°44′31″N 51°26′49″E

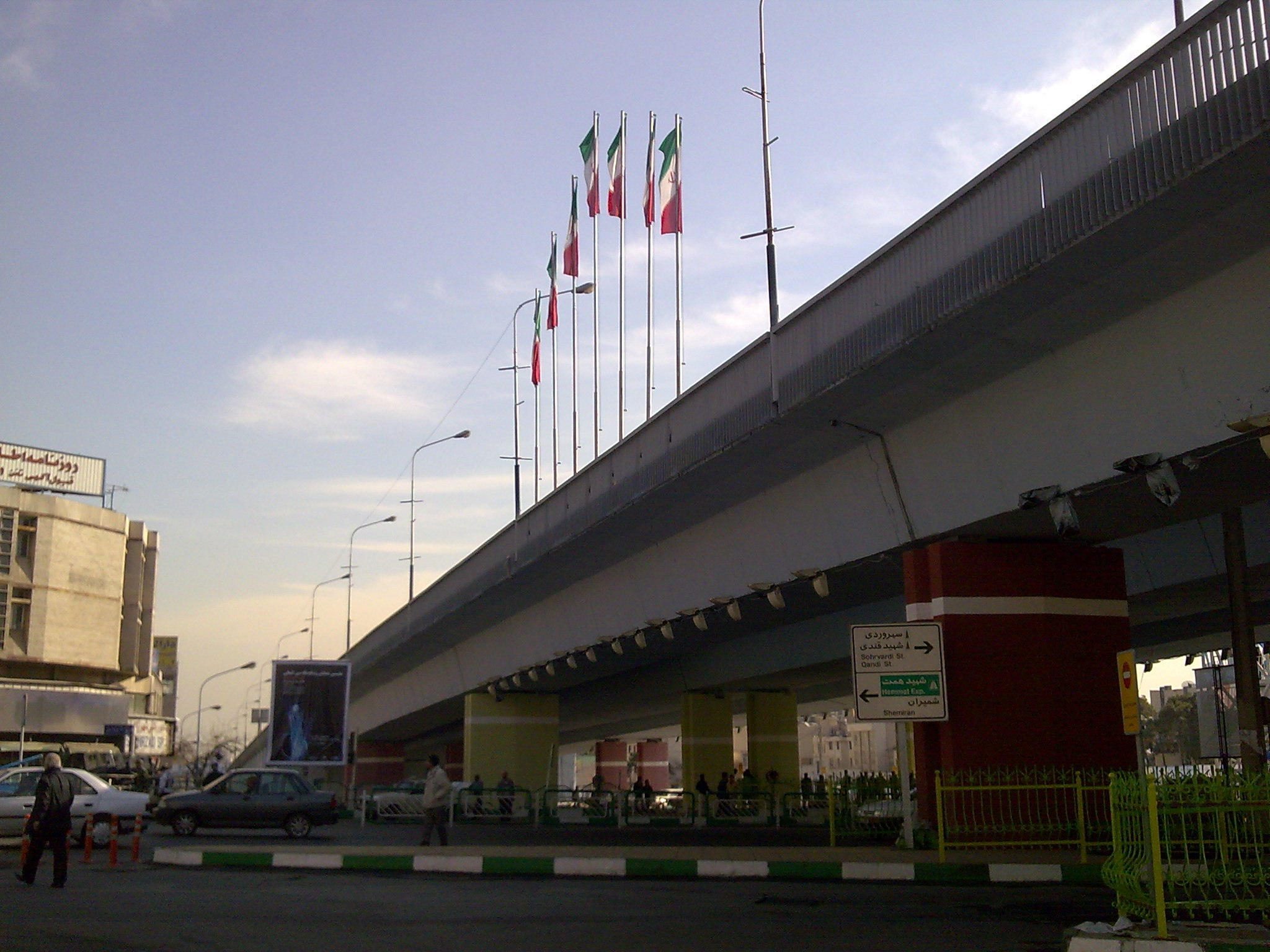

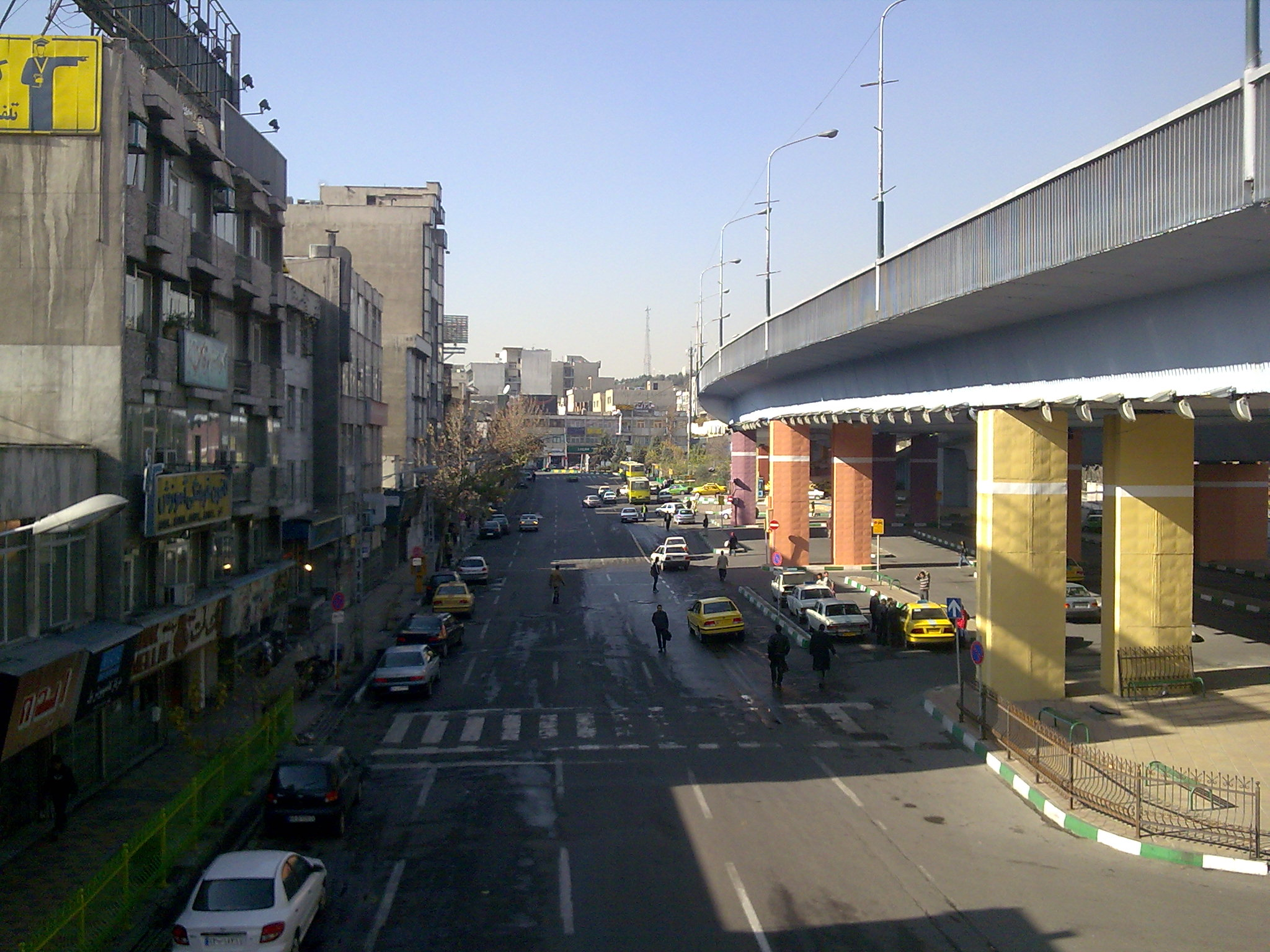

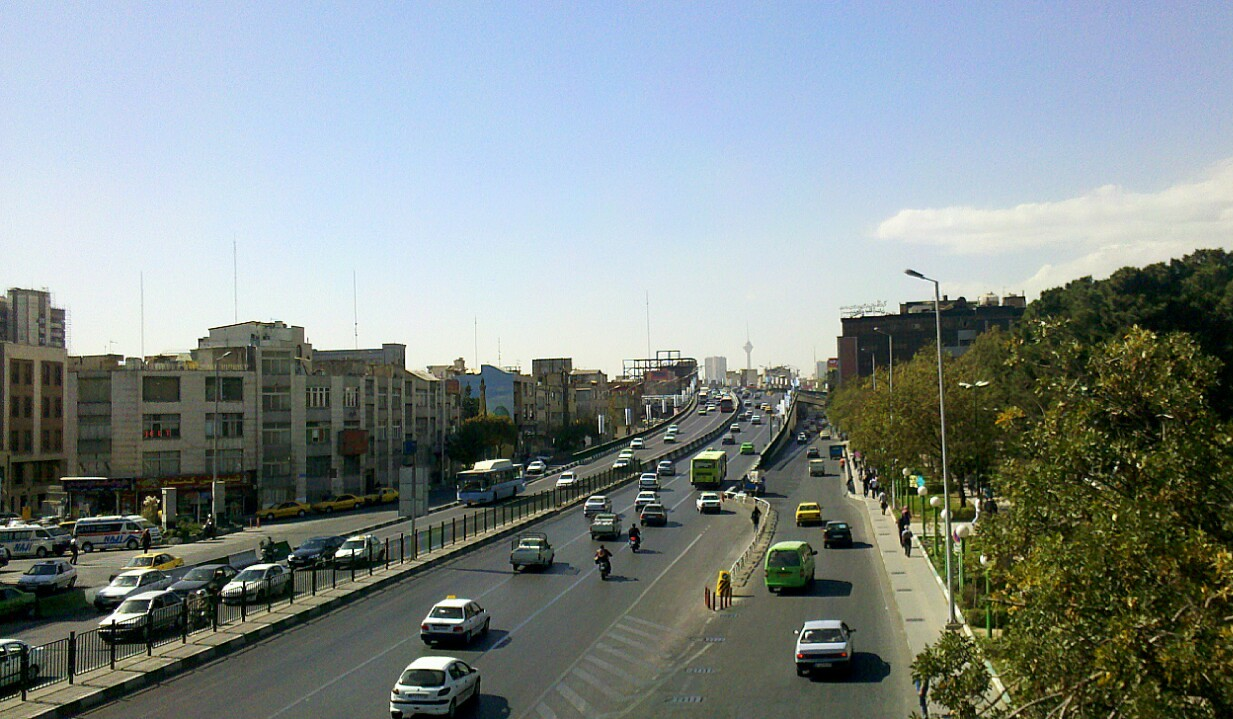

Seyed Khandan (Persian: سیدخندان) is a district of the city of Tehran in Iran. It is the junction of Shariati Street and Qasem Soleimani Expressway (formerly, Resalat Expressway), near the Resalat district.

== History ==
Years ago, there was a cheerful man named "Seyyed" short for Seyyed Hossein Niavarani who ran a Coffeehouse ("Ghahveh Khaneh" in Persian) just north of where the Seyyed Khandan bridge is now located. In those days, Shariati Street was called the Old Road ("Jaddeh Ghadim" in Persian (جاده قدیم)). This street connected the center to the north of Tehran (Shemiranat). At the time, there were no automobiles traveling at high speed, and passing through Old Road was often time-consuming, so travelers usually stopped to rest along the way ( travellers included Mohammad Reza Shah). Seyyed's coffeehouse was convenient, because it was almost in the center of Old Road. The area was named Seyyed Khandan after the cheerful coffeehouse owner.

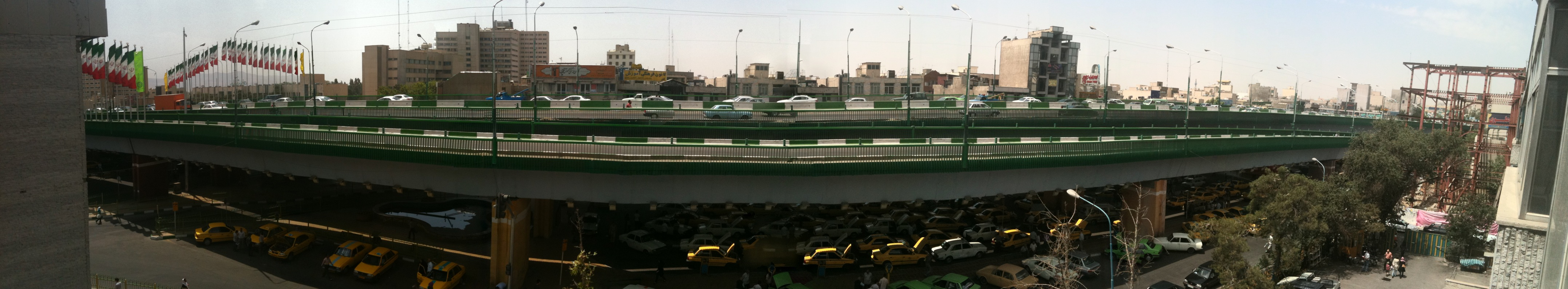
Panoramic view from Seyyed khandan Bridge.
