= Resalat (district) =

Neighbourhood in Tehran

Resalat (Persian: رسالت) is a neighborhood located in the eastern part of Tehran, Iran. It includes Resalat Square, also known as Risalat Square.

Resalat Highway joins this locality to Seyed Khandan in north-central Tehran and further to western parts of Tehran metropolis.

On 9 March 2026, around 40 people were killed by US and Israeli bombs near the square. The Iranian Red Crescent Society assisted in the removal of dead bodies and helped rescue injured survivors.
