= Risala Road =

Commercial area of Hyderabad, India

Risala Road is one of the most famous commercial area of Hyderabad.

== Overview ==
It starts from ending point of Tilak incline and ends on Hyderabad Railway Junction and it is also connected with few other areas of Hyderabad. It is said to be very busy road of Hyderabad.

== Well known local places ==
Risala Road is one of the main commercial roads of Hyderabad after Autobahn road it is the second largest road of Hyderabad with a length of 8 kilometers, it touches some of the most famous areas of Hyderabad including Tilak incline, Chot ki ghitti, Gol building garments market, Resham gali, and Pacco Qillo. This road contains many famous shops and markets, including universal book depot, dawood super mart, electronic market etc. But due to lack of attention by the authorities the road is hardly visible due to encroachment it is like a mafia trying to eat the whole road, at day time it is bound to be jam packed with traffic till the closing time of the shops and markets that are spread encroachment on the road but still Risala Road has its value in Hyderabad that is why most of the people go there on daily basis.
