= Resaleh-ye haqiqat-nameh =

1823 Persian-language treatise

Resāleh-ye ḥaqīqat-nameh (Persian: رساله حقیقت نامه; "Treatise on Revealing the Truth") is an 1823 Persian-language treatise written by Alexander Kasimovich Kazembek. Consisting of 92 pages, an introduction, and four chapters, the work was composed and printed (by John Mitchell) in Astrakhan in what was then the Russian Empire (now Russia). Kazembeg's treatise belongs to a series of 19th-century Arabic and Persian works that were part of eastern missionary activity, and were produced by Protestant and Catholic missionaries. The treatise is noteworthy for being one of the first extant Persian treatises of a Muslim convert to Christianity. In the work, Kazembeg safeguards Christian doctrines by subverting Islamic arguments against them.

At least two known extant copies of the work are located in Tehran, Iran; one in the Library of the Majles-e Shora-ye Eslami, and one in the Library of the Madrese-ye Ali-ye Motehhari (also known as Sepahsalar).
