= Mladorossy =

Russian émigré movement

Mladorossy Младороссы
- Glava ("Head"): Aleksandr Kazem-Bek
- Founded: 1923
- Dissolved: 18 May 1940
- Membership: 1,400–5,000
- Ideology: Monarchism (legitimism); Corporatism; Russian nationalism; Fascism
- Political position: Far-right

Party flag

The Mladorossy (Russian: Младороссы, roughly "young Russians") was a political movement of young Russian émigré monarchists during the interwar period. An ideologically eclectic group, they drew extensively from Italian fascism as well as from the Russian past and the Bolshevik experiment, combining elements from Russian monarchy and the Soviet system, (best evidenced by their mottos "Tsar and the Soviets" and claims to be "the second Soviet Party") with fascist notions of class collaboration and corporatism, ultranationalism, emphasis on youth and cult of their leader, Aleksandr Kazem-Bek.

== History ==
The movement was established in 1923 as a monarchist youth organisation, the "Union of Young Russia" (in Russian: Союз Молодой России, Soyuz Molodoy Rossii) in Munich. Its emergence was the consequence of a meeting of young Russian monarchist groups, mostly aligned with the "legitimist" camp (partisans of Grand Duke Kirill Vladimirovich), in which Aleksandr L'vovich Kazem-Bek was elected as the president of a new, unified organisation. Son of a high-profile supporter of Kirill Vladimirovich, Kazem-Bek belonged to a thoroughly Russified family of Persian origin, and remained proud of these roots. Soon after, Kazem-Bek would move the group's headquarters to Paris, and in 1925 would change its name to Union of Mladorossy (Russian: Союз Младороссов, romanized: Soyuz Mladorossov).

Not unlike other groups of émigré youth, the Mladorossy did not seek a return to the old order, and saw the political groupings of the preceding generation as outdated. They advocated instead for developing a new, young Russia (hence their use of the prefix mlado, "young"). Consequently, the group sought inspiration in Italian fascism, which they perceived to be also a movement based on youth. Moreover, the fascists were perceived as having established a system that was both national and social. One of Kirill Vladimirovich's closest collaborators, naval officer Garal'd Graf, stressed in his memoirs the fascination that Mussolini's movement exerted on Kazem-Bek, and posited that the Mladorossy's growing popularity coincided with the "flourishing" of Mussolini's Italy. Indeed, for an émigré youth movement, the Mladorossy managed to achieve a significant size, with sources putting the group's membership as ranging from 1400 to over 4000 individuals.

The Mladorossy had become a household name in the emigration by the 1930s, with the group publishing a number of promotional books and brochures, as well as several periodicals in Europe, the Far East and the Americas. In 1933 Kazem-Bek attempted to establish an alliance with other fascist parties in the Russian diaspora, such as Anastasii Vonsiatskii's All-Russian Fascist Organization and Russian Nazi sympathisers in Berlin led by Prince Pavel Bermondt-Avalov. This collaboration would prove short-lived.

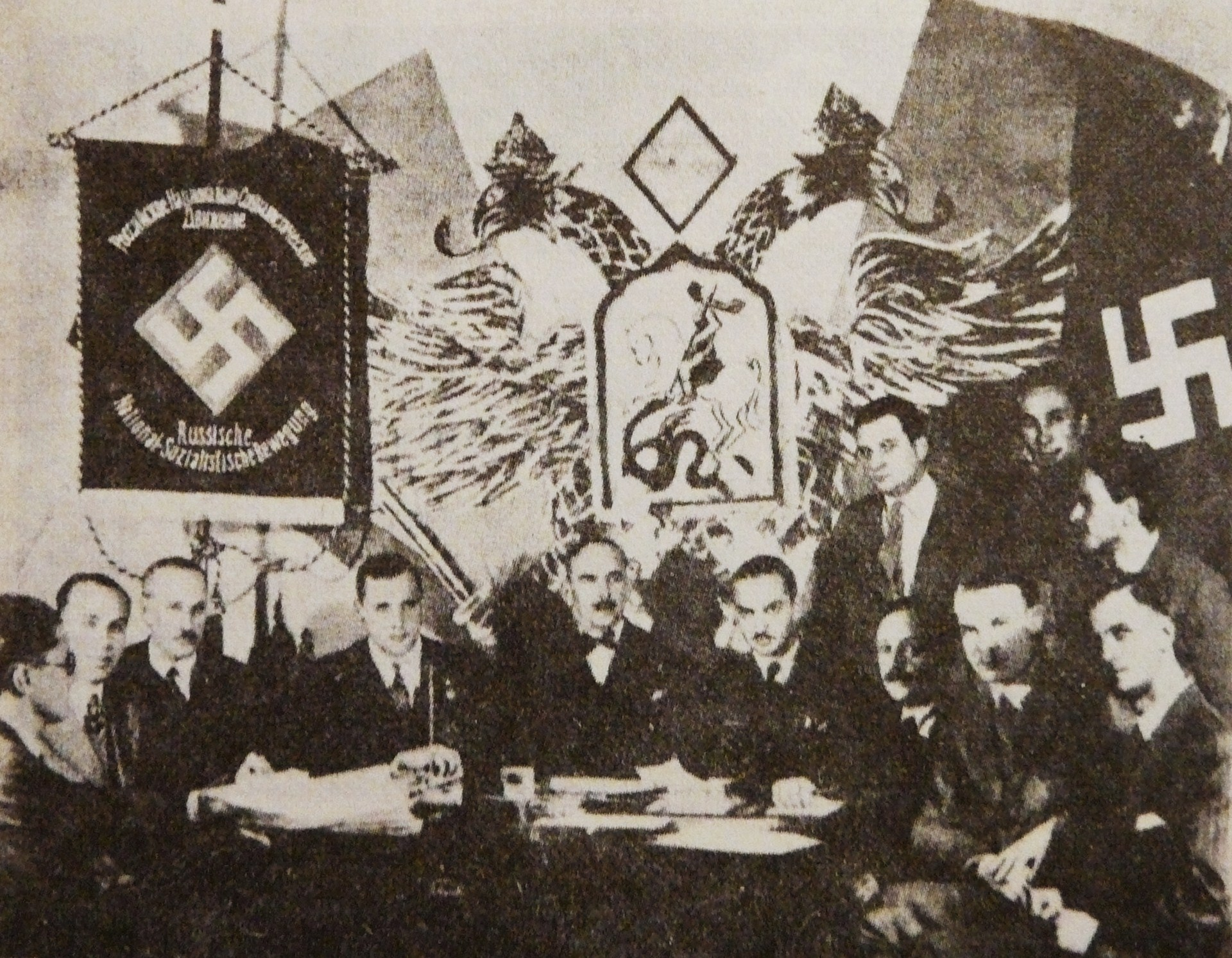
Kazem-Bek along with Vonsiatskii and Bermondt-Avalov in Berlin, 1933

In 1934, trying to deepen the ties of the group with the Italian fascist regime, Kazem-Bek travelled to Rome and managed to secure an audience with Mussolini. While the meeting itself was kept secret, the organisation managed to secure support from the Italian government. Moreover, the trip reinforced Kazem-Bek's enthusiasm for the Italian experiment. Viktor Kosik has underlined how the Mladorossy embraced the corporative elements introduced by fascism, as well as the notion that private property should be protected by law, but also came with social obligations. As was the case for Mussolini, the Mladorossy believed that the state was above class or individual considerations.

Kazem-Bek reorganised the group in 1935, establishing the Mladorosskaia Partiia (Russian: Младоросская партия, roughly "Young Russian Party"). Nevertheless, the organisation would soon enter a crisis. By the 1930s, the Mladorossy had adopted an increasingly sympathetic attitude towards some developments in the Soviet Union, promoted a "defensist" view in the event of a new World War, and claiming that they were to become the "second Soviet party". This led to suspicions among White émigrés that the organization was being influenced, if not controlled, by the Soviet secret police. Such fears seemed to be confirmed in 1937, when the leader of the Mladorossy, Kazem-Bek, was spotted in a cafe in France speaking to Count Aleksei Ignat'ev, a former Tsarist general in Soviet employ. While Garal'd Graf maintains that Kirill Vladimirovich did not believe Kazem-Bek to be a traitor, instead accusing him of committing an act of stupidity, such an event irreparably damaged the image of the movement. According to Mireille Massip, this led to the Grand Duke scaling back his ties with the Mladorossy, and Kazem-Bek relinquishing his position as advisor to the Romanov pretender.

At the start of World War II, the official organ of the party, Bodrost!, published in Paris, carried a front-page statement expressing their support for the anti-German coalition and offering their services to the French authorities. The French, however, were suspicious of their potential ties to Soviet intelligence, in particular given Stalin's decision to seize Polish territories. Nevertheless, some Mladorossy managed to enlist, while other members would join the French Resistance after the German occupation. This, however, happened already after the dissolution of the party, announced by Kazem-Bek on 18 May 1940.

== Ideology ==
The Mladorossy were monarchists, but often clashed with representatives of the previous generation who stood for autocracy. Unlike them, the Mladorossy did not see the old regime as desirable or even viable in the modern era, and therefore did not stand for the restoration of autocracy. Instead, they promoted a "'social' monarchy" headed by Grand Duke Kirill, which would retain some Soviet institutions and be placed on top of a national dictatorship headed by a leader (vozhd'). In this sense, the Italian experiment of having a King and Duce appealed to them.

Nicholas Hayes, describing the Mladorossy as a group of "openly fascist Russian nationalists", has argued that the organisation rejected "counterrevolution", instead proposing a new national revolution in the fascist mould, although maintaining that they were more interested in the fascist "style, psychology, and anticommunism" than in the intricacies of their ideology. Nevertheless, he argues, the leader of the group "learned from Italian fascism that a successful national revolution must, first of all, win the masses by taking over the social promises of the old Left and, second, must acquire legitimacy by wooing the monarchy away from the old Right. Walter Laqueur, for his part, posited that "Kazem Bek accepted all the trappings of fascism—uniforms, military discipline, and adulation of the leader", believing that the Empire had decayed beyond repair and was not worth restoring, and "in this light the treatment meted out to the old regime by the Bolsheviks had been justified".

While the Mladorossy were very enthusiastic regarding Mussolini's regime, their attitude towards Nazism was more ambivalent. While some ideological affinities existed, Hitler's plans regarding Russia worried Kazem-Bek and his followers. From 1938 onwards, a significant part of their writings would be devoted to trying to raise awareness of the threat posed by Germany to Europe in general and Russia in particular. Given Russia's diverse nature in terms of religious and ethnic makeup, as well as Kazem-Bek's own background, the group was also opposed to Nazi-style biological racism. Nevertheless, the Mladorossy believed in the general supremacy of the European race over non-European peoples. This translated into support for fascist Italy's colonial endeavours in Africa as well as for Russia's perceived mission to keep the yellow peril at bay in Asia.

The group would, at times, heap praise on Stalin as having restored a semblance of order through the establishment of a Soviet Bonapartism (inverting the valuation, in a way, of Trotskii's accusations to the same effect). The Mladorossy approved of the retreat from internationalism to a more national form of socialism under the Soviet dictator. They also approved of some of the achievements of the USSR in terms of industrialising society and even the developing cult of personality surrounding the Georgian Bolshevik. The Mladorossy did not, however, trust that Stalin, as a man of the older generation, could reach the goals they themselves had set out for Russia. They believed a younger figure had to replace him, with Hayes arguing that Kazem-Bek saw the success of his own national revolution as a continuation of "Stalinism without Stalin". Indeed, they took an increasingly evolutionary view of affairs in their homeland, hoping for the Soviet Union to develop in the direction of a national dictatorship. Nevertheless, this benevolent ambivalence towards the regime headed by Stalin was contingent on him being seen by the group as a figure that had strengthened Russia. His purges of the armed forces and, eventually, his dealings with Hitler were perceived as threatening the future of their nation, and turned the group decidedly against the Soviet ruler.

== See also ==
- National Alliance of Russian Solidarists
- Eurasianism
- Russian All-Military Union
- White émigré
