= The Cambridge History of Russia =

2006 3-volume book of Russian history

- Author: Maureen Perrie, Dominic Lieven, Ronald Grigor Suny (eds.)
- Country: United Kingdom
- Language: English
- Genre: Russian history
- Publisher: Cambridge University Press
- Published: 2006
- No. of books: 3

The Cambridge History of Russia is a multi-volume survey of Russian history published by Cambridge University Press (CUP).

== Volumes ==
- Vol. 1. From Early Rus' to 1689 edited by Maureen Perrie, covering Russian history before Peter the Great (ISBN 978-0-521-81227-6)
- Vol. 2. Imperial Russia, 1689–1917 edited by Dominic Lieven, covering the Russian Empire (ISBN 978-0-521-81529-1)
- Vol. 3. The Twentieth Century edited by Ronald Grigor Suny, covering Russian history after the October Revolution, including the Soviet Union (ISBN 978-0-521-81144-6)

== See also ==
- History of Russia
- The Cambridge History of Russian Literature
- The Cambridge History of Inner Asia, which includes many chapters on nomadic and forest people in present-day Russia.
