= Sincerely Dears... =

Compilation album by Yukari Tamura
- Released: March 28, 2007
- Genre: J-pop
- Length: CD: 50:34, DVD: 1:06:21
- Label: Konami Digital Entertainment

Yukari Tamura chronology
Gin no Senritsu, Kioku no Mizuoto. (2006)	Sincerely Dears... (2007)

Sincerely Dears... is Yukari Tamura's second compilation album, released on March 28, 2007. It contains a bonus DVD with a digest version of her 2006 concert tour *fancy baby doll* filmed in Tokyo and Fukuoka and a Special Photo Book.

== Track listing ==
1. summer melody
  - Lyrics: Karin
  - Arrangement and composition: Acryl Vox
2. Love♡parade
  - Lyrics: Karen Shiina
  - Composition: Mioko Yamaguchi
  - Arrangement: Masami Kishimura
3. Baby's Breath
  - Lyrics: Yukiko Mitsui
  - Composition: cota
  - Arrangement: Masaki Iwamoto
4. Lovely Magic
  - Lyrics and composition: Mika Watanabe
  - Arrangement: Mika Watanabe and Kanichirou Kubo
  - Opening theme song of her radio show, Snuggery of Black Bunny (田村ゆかりの黒うさぎの小部屋, Tamura Yukari no Kuro Usagi no Kobeya).
5. 眠れぬ夜につかまえて (Nemurenu Yoru ni Tsukamaete)
  - Lyrics: Manami Fujino
  - Arrangement and composition: Tsugumi Kataoka
6. 夢見月のアリス (Yumemizuki no Alice)
  - Lyrics: Uran
  - Arrangement and composition: Kaoru Okubo
  - Opening theme song of her radio show, Snuggery of Black Bunny (田村ゆかりの黒うさぎの小部屋, Tamura Yukari no Kuro Usagi no Kobeya).
7. Little Wish ～lyrical step～
  - Lyrics: Karen Shiina
  - Arrangement and composition: Masatomo Ota
  - Ending theme song for Magical Girl Lyrical Nanoha (魔法少女リリカルなのは, Mahō Shōjo Ririkaru Nanoha)
8. 恋せよ女の子 (Koi seyo Onnanoko)
  - Lyrics: Miku Hazuki
  - Composition and arrangement: Kazuya Komatsu
  - Opening theme for Gokujou Seitokai (極上生徒会, Ultimate Student Council) TV series
9. Spiritual Garden
  - Lyrics: Yukiko Mitsui
  - Composition and arrangement: Masatomo Ota
  - Ending theme song for Magical Girl Lyrical Nanoha A's (魔法少女リリカルなのは A's, Mahō Shōjo Ririkaru Nanoha A's)
10. 童話迷宮 (Dōwa Meikyū)
  - Lyrics: Aki Hata
  - Arrangement and composition: Masatomo Ota
  - Opening theme song for Otogi-Jushi Akazukin (おとぎ銃士 赤ずきん) TV series
11. Princess Rose
  - Lyrics: Yukiko Mitsui
  - Arrangement and composition: Yukari Hashimoto
  - Second opening theme song for Otogi-Jushi Akazukin (おとぎ銃士 赤ずき) TV series
12. YOURS EVER
  - Lyrics and composition: marhy
  - Arrangement: marhy, tetsu-yeah

== DVD ==
Concert Tour 2006 *fancy baby doll* Special Edition

1. opening
2. Little Wish ～first step～
3. Cutie♡Cutie
4. デイジー・ブルー (DEIJII BURUU)
5. エアシューター (EA SHUUTAA)
6. 宵待ちの花 (Yoimachi no Hana)
7. -backstage of FBD tour-
8. Amazing kiss
9. Black cherry
10. 童話迷宮 (Dōwa Meikyū)
11. 恋せよ女の子 (Koi seyo Onnanoko)
12. fancy baby doll
13. -neko, neco & yukari-
14. - MC -
15. 優しい夜に。 (Yasashii Yoru ni)
16. ending
