= Kohaku no Uta, Hitohira =

Studio album by Yukari Tamura
- Released: March 2, 2005
- Genre: J-pop
- Length: 54:48
- Label: Konami Music Entertainment

Yukari Tamura chronology
Aozora ni Yureru Mitsugetsu no Kobune. (2003)	Kohaku no Uta, Hitohira (2005)	Gin no Senritsu, Kioku no Mizuoto. (2006)

Kohaku no Uta, Hitohira (琥珀の詩、ひとひら) is Yukari Tamura's fourth album, released on March 2, 2005.

== Track listing ==
1. コハクノウタ*目覚め* (Kohaku no Uta *Mezame*)
  - Arrangement and composition: Kaoru Okubo
2. Spring Fever
  - Lyrics: Manami Fujino
  - Arrangement and composition: Yukari Hashimoto
3. Ever-Never-Land
  - Lyrics: Kanade Kotowa
  - Arrangement and composition: Masatomo Ota
  - Opening theme song for Otogi-Jushi Akazukin (おとぎ銃士 赤ずき) OVA series
4. Fallin' Into you
  - Lyrics: Yuki Matsuura
  - Arrangement and composition: Takuya Watanabe
5. 夢見月のアリス (Yumemizuki no Alice)
  - Lyrics: Uran
  - Arrangement and composition: Kaoru Okubo
  - Opening theme song of her radio show, Snuggery of Black Bunny (田村ゆかりの黒うさぎの小部屋, Tamura Yukari no Kuro Usagi no Kobeya).
6. AMBER～人魚の涙～ (AMBER ~Ningyo no Namida~)
  - Lyrics: Uran
  - Arrangement and composition: Kaoru Okubo
7. fantasia
  - Lyrics and composition: Mika Watanabe
  - Arrangement: Mika Watanabe and Kanichirou Kubo
8. 薔薇のロマンセ 月のセレーネ (Bara no ROMANSE Tsuki no SEREENE)
  - Lyrics: Mika Watanbe
  - Composition: Shinji Tamura
  - Arrangement: Yasunari Nakamura
9. 惑星のランデブー (Hoshi no RANDEBUU)
  - Lyrics: Yukari Tamura
  - Composition: HULK
  - Arrangement: Kaoru Okubo
10. 最果ての森 (Saihate no Mori)
  - Lyrics: Risa Horie
  - Composition: Hiroyuki Ichiki
  - Arrangement: Kaoru Okubo
11. コハクノウタ*祈り* (Kohaku no Uta *Inori*)
  - Arrangement and composition: Kaoru Okubo
12. 心の扉 (Kokoro no Tobira)
  - Lyrics, arrangement and composition: marhy
13. Little Wish ～first step～
  - Lyrics: Karen Shiina
  - Arrangement and composition: Masatomo Ota
  - Ending theme song for Magical Girl Lyrical Nanoha (魔法少女リリカルなのは, Mahō Shōjo Ririkaru Nanoha)
14. Picnic
  - Lyrics: Miku Hazuki
  - Composition and arrangement: Kazuya Komatsu
