= Izayoi no Tsuki, Canaria no Koi. =

Studio album by Yukari Tamura
- Released: February 27, 2008
- Genre: J-pop
- Label: King Records
- Producer: Masatomo Ōta

Yukari Tamura chronology
Gin no Senritsu, Kioku no Mizuoto. (2006)	Izayoi no Tsuki, Canaria no Koi. (2008)	Komorebi no Rosette (2009)

Izayoi no Tsuki, Canaria no Koi. (十六夜の月、カナリアの恋。) is Yukari Tamura's sixth original album, released on February 27, 2008. The DVD comes with the first pressing limited edition only. It reached the 12th place on the Oricon Weekly Albums Chart.

== Track listing ==
1. Overture ~secret new moon~
  - Arrangement and composition: Masatomo Ōta
2. Swing Heart
  - Lyrics: Uran
  - Arrangement and composition: Masatomo Ōta
3. Kataomoi Roulette (片思いルーレット)
  - Lyrics: Uran
  - Composition: Kaoru Ōkubo
  - Arrangement: Yoshimasa Kawabata & DUX
4. Non-Stopping Train
  - Lyrics and composition: marhy
  - Arrangement: Yoshimasa Kawabata
5. Hoshizora no Spica (星空のSpica)
  - Lyrics: Karen Shiina
  - Arrangement and composition: Masatomo Ōta
  - First ending theme song for Magical Girl Lyrical Nanoha StrikerS
6. Sand Mark
  - Lyrics: Mika Watanabe
  - Arrangement and composition: Hideyuki "Daichi" Suzuki
7. Petite lumière
  - Lyrics: Mika Watanabe
  - Arrangement and composition: Jun Ichikawa
  - Strings & chorus arrangement: Masatomo Ōta
8. Beautiful Amulet
  - Lyrics: Karen Shiina
  - Arrangement and composition: Masatomo Ōta
  - Second ending theme song for Magical Girl Lyrical Nanoha StrikerS
9. Interlude ~moonlight flower~
  - Arrangement and composition: Masatomo Ōta
10. Oki ni Mesu Mama (お気に召すまま)
  - Lyrics: Manami Fujino
  - Arrangement and composition: DUX
  - Sax arrangement: Yoshinari Takegami
11. Chelsea Girl (チェルシーガール)
  - Lyrics: Yukiko Mitsui
  - Arrangement and composition: Masatomo Ōta
  - Brass arrangement: Yoshinari Takegami
  - Opening theme song to her radio shows "Yukari Tamura, Mischievous Black Rabbit" and "Café Black Rabbit ~Secret Nook~" (February 2008 - )
12. Koi ha Nami no You ni (恋は波のように)
  - Lyrics: Mika Watanabe
  - Arrangement and composition: Masatomo Ōta
13. Jōgen no Tsuki (上弦の月)
  - Lyrics and composition: marhy
  - Arrangement: DUX
  - Ending theme song to her radio show "Yukari Tamura, Mischievous Black Rabbit" (February 2008 - )
14. Happy Life
  - Lyrics and composition: Takeshi Isozaki
  - Arrangement: Hideyuki "Daichi" Suzuki
15. Finale ~Sweet full moon~
  - Arrangement and composition: Masatomo Ōta

== DVD ==
"Chelsea Girl" (チェルシーガール)

1. MUSIC CLIP
2. MAKING MOVIE
