= Dōwa Meikyū =

2006 album by Yukari Tamura

Single by Yukari Tamura
- Released: August 2, 2006
- Genre: J-pop
- Length: 12:58
- Label: Konami Digital Entertainment
- Songwriter(s): Aki Hata, Masatomo Ota

Yukari Tamura singles chronology
"Spiritual Garden" (2005)	"Dōwa Meikyū" (2006)	"Princess Rose" (2006)

Dōwa Meikyū (童話迷宮) is Yukari Tamura's tenth single, released on August 2, 2006. Dōwa Meikyū is the first opening theme song for the Otogi-Jushi Akazukin (おとぎ銃士 赤ずきん) TV series. The B-sides, miss you and Tenshi no Oshigoto were opening and ending theme songs respectively for Yukari's radio show, Snuggery of Black Bunny (田村ゆかりの黒うさぎの小部屋, Tamura Yukari no Kuro Usagi no Kobeya).

== Track listing ==
1. 童話迷宮 (Dōwa Meikyū)
  - Lyrics: Aki Hata
  - Arrangement and composition: Masatomo Ota
2. miss you
  - Lyrics, arrangement and composition: Hayato Tanaka
3. 天使のお仕事 (Tenshi no Oshigoto)
  - Lyrics: Manami Fujino
  - Arrangement and composition: tetsu-yeah
