= What's New Pussycat? (disambiguation) =

What's New Pussycat? is a 1965 comedy film directed by Clive Donner.

What's New Pussycat? may also refer to:

- What's New Pussycat? (Tom Jones album), a 1965 album by Tom Jones

- "What's New Pussycat?" (song), the album's title track

- What's New Pussycat? (musical), a 2021 jukebox musical featuring the songs of Tom Jones, based on Henry Fielding's 1749 novel The History of Tom Jones, a Foundling
- What's New, Pussycat? (album) a 1997 album by Yukari Tamura
