= Princess Rose =

Single by Yukari Tamura
- Released: December 20, 2006
- Genre: J-pop
- Length: 13:15
- Label: Konami Digital Entertainment
- Songwriter(s): Yukiko Mitsui, Yukari Hashimoto

Yukari Tamura singles chronology
| "Dōwa Meikyū" (2006) | "Princess Rose" (2006) | "Hoshizora no Spica" (2007) |

Princess Rose is Yukari Tamura's eleventh single, released on December 20, 2006. Princess Rose is the second opening theme song for the Otogi-Jushi Akazukin (おとぎ銃士 赤ずきん) TV series and the latest opening theme song for her radio show, Snuggery of Black Bunny (田村ゆかりの黒うさぎの小部屋, Tamura Yukari no Kuro Usagi no Kobeya). Present is the latest ending theme song for her radio show.

== Track listing ==
1. Princess Rose
  - Lyrics: Yukiko Mitsui
  - Arrangement and composition: Yukari Hashimoto
2. 恋のチカラ (Koi no Chikara)
  - 君だけのアイコト (Kimi dake no Aikoto)
  - Lyrics and composition: Hayato Tanaka
  - Arrangement: Kono Shin
3. プレゼント (PUREZENTO)
  - Lyrics: Manami Fujino
  - Arrangement and composition: Masatomo Ota
