= True Romance (Yukari Tamura album) =

Greatest hits album by Yukari Tamura
- Released: March 5, 2003
- Genre: J-pop
- Length: 70:27
- Label: Konami Music Entertainment

Yukari Tamura chronology
Hana-furi Tsukiyo to Koi-youbi. (2002)	True Romance (2003)	Aozora ni Yureru Mitsugetsu no Kobune. (2003)

True Romance is Yukari Tamura's first compilation album, released on March 5, 2003.

== Track listing ==
1. Angel Pride – 3:34
  - Lyrics: Yukiko Mitsui
  - Composition: cota
  - Arrangement: Mitsutoshi Hirose
  - Opening theme song for Angelic Concert (エンジェリック・コンサート, ENJERIKKU KONSAATO)
2. Love Countdown – 3:58
  - Lyrics: Kakeru Saegusa
  - Arrangement and composition: Kazuhisa Yamaguchi
3. WE CAN FLY ～solo fight～ – 4:49
  - Lyrics: Meg
  - Arrangement and composition: Motoyoshi Iwasaki
4. ブラックダリア (BURAKKU DARIA) – 4:46
  - Lyrics: Mitsuko Shiramine
  - Arrangement: Yuuko Asai
  - Composition: Ryou Yonemitsu
5. DAYDREAM – 4:23
  - Lyrics: Kakeru Saegusa
  - Arrangement and composition: Kazuhisa Yamaguchi
6. 楽園 ～Mei Version～ (Rakuen ~Mei Version~) – 4:42
  - Lyrics: Karen Shiina
  - Composition: MIZUKI
  - Arrangement: Ryou Yonemitsu
7. Sweetest Love – 5:16
  - Lyrics and composition: marhy
  - Arrangement: Motoyoshi Iwasaki
8. Sparkle with delight – 5:48
  - Lyrics: Kakeru Saegusa
  - Arrangement and composition: Kazuhisa Yamaguchi
9. CATCH MY EYES – 5:25
  - Lyrics: Mitsuko Shiramine
  - Composition: Toshiaki Yamazaki
  - Arrangement: Ryou Yonemitsu
10. まぶしさ (Mabushisa) – 5:42
  - Lyrics, arrangement and composition: Chiyomaru Shikura
11. My Life is Great – 3:42
  - Lyrics: Karen Shiina
  - Arrangement and composition: Mitsutoshi Hirose
12. 輝きの季節 (Kagayaki no Kisetsu) – 4:45
  - Lyrics: Kakeru Saegusa
  - Arrangement and composition: Kazuhisa Yamaguchi
13. 指切りしよう (Yubikiri Shiyou) – 4:42
  - Lyrics: Shun Taguchi
  - Composition: Takahiro Koike
  - Arrangement: Masafumi Miyokawa
14. Trust me, trust you～Yukari Version～ – 4:21
  - Lyrics, arrangement and composition: Yuki Matsuura
15. メロディフラワー (MERODII FURAWAA) – 4:15
  - Lyrics: Karen Shiina
  - Composition: cota
  - Arrangement: Mitsutoshi Hirose
  - Ending theme song for Angelic Concert (エンジェリック・コンサート, ENJERIKKU KONSAATO)
