= Yukari Hashimoto =

Japanese composer and arranger

Yukari Hashimoto (橋本 由香利, Hashimoto Yukari) is a Japanese composer and arranger. She has composed the music for a number of anime series, including:

- Toradora!
- Omamori Himari
- Mayo Chiki!
- Sayonara, Zetsubou-Sensei
- Kanamemo
- MM!
- Penguindrum
- Yurikuma Arashi
- Sankarea: Undying Love
- Golden Time
- If Her Flag Breaks
- Mr. Osomatsu
- March Comes in Like a Lion
- Sarazanmai
- Komi Can't Communicate
- Zenshu

Collaborations with Yukari Tamura include arranging some tracks on the album Gin no Senritsu, Kioku no Mizuoto.. She composed and arranged the music for the song "Cutie ♥ Cutie" on Tamura's single Spiritual Garden and the track Princess Rose. She also composed and arranged the music of "Spring Fever" on the album Kohaku no Uta, Hitohira and "Princess Rose" on the album Sincerely Dears....

Hashimoto also composed two tracks from the drama CD ""The Matinée of the Palace" Chapter.3 ~Unspeakable Lines~" from Tsubasa: Reservoir Chronicle, along with the ending theme to Tsukuyomi: Moon Phase, "Kanashii Yokan".
