= Mioko =

Mioko may refer to:

- Mioko Yamaguchi (山口 美央子, born 1959), Japanese singer-songwriter
- Mioko Fujiwara
- Mioko Island, part of the Duke of York Islands.
