= List of Katanagatari characters =

This is a list of fictional characters from the Katanagatari light novel/anime series.

== Main characters ==
Shichika Yasuri (鑢 七花, Yasuri Shichika)
Voiced by: Yoshimasa Hosoya
Shichika is the seventh head of the Kyotōryū school of Japanese martial arts. He was raised on the isolated island of Fushō in Tanba Province. He was twenty-four years old when sought out by Togame to aid in her mission of finding all twelve of the legendary "Deviant Blades". The Yasuri family has historically been unable to wield actual swords, instead relying solely on their limbs in a fight. Shichika was raised as a weapon and thus is rather poor at expressing emotion, regarding himself as a sword with Togame as his wielder. At the start of the journey, he is confused by the simplest customs and even has trouble telling people apart. Shichika also states that he's in love with Togame, following her orders even though he considers them to be a hassle. As he encounters more people, he becomes more human and feels remorse for those he killed earlier on in their quest. After Togame's death, Shichika does not obey her final orders to live on and forget her, but resolves to die at the hands of Emonzaemon. Shichika's grief leads him to storm the shogun's castle alone in an attempt at suicide, but destroys all twelve original Deviant Blades and their wielders, fulfilling his role as the final completed Deviant Blade. At the conclusion of the series, Shichika is seen travelling, following Togame's wish to create a complete map of Japan.
Height: (6尺8寸) ~2.06m, Weight: (20貫) ~75kg.
Togame (とがめ, Togame)
Voiced by: Yukari Tamura
Togame is a self-titled strategist working for the shogunate. She travels alone to the island where the Yasuri family was exiled and asks for Shichika's help in collecting the twelve "Deviant Blades". Togame does not trust others due to being betrayed in the past, so she asks Shichika to fall in love with her, believing that only love will surpass all other temptations of the quest. Togame is a cheery girl that carries herself as royalty and has a habit of wearing extravagant clothing. She has a strong will and great intelligence, but is not immune to clumsiness or bad judgment. Togame often proclaims that she is physically fragile. Her real name is Princess Yōsha Hida (飛弾 容赦姫, Hida Yōsha Hime; lit. 'Princess Mercy Hida'), the only child of Takahito Hida, the feudal lord who led the previous rebellion and was murdered by Shichika's father, Mutsue Yasuri. After she witnessed the murder of her father, her hair turned white. The eye that saw the event through a gap in the doorframe takes on a snake-like appearance whenever she is scheming. One of the Maniwa Ninja note that it "shines with ambition". At the conclusion of their journey, Togame is fatally wounded by Emonzaemon. As she lays dying, Togame tells Shichika that everything was for the sake of revenge, including the part of her that fell in love with him. She says she intended to kill him once the sword collection was complete and is relieved to die because she will not have to do it. The last order she gives is for Shichika to forget about her. With her final breath, she says she is happy and asks if it is okay for her to love him.
Height: (4尺8寸) ~145.4cm, Weight: (8貫3斤) ~31.8kg.

== Deviant Blade Wielders ==
Kōmori Maniwa (真庭 蝙蝠, Maniwa Kōmori)
Voiced by: Chihiro Suzuki
A member of the Beast Squad, he is one of the heads of the Maniwa Corps, a group of ninja seeking out the Deviant Blades. He is the first opponent in the series Shichika fights for said swords. He wields Kanna, a straight blade designed to never bend nor break that he stores inside his body. He is able to shoot kunai from his mouth and transform into an exact physical copy of any being. He is killed by Shichika while copying Togame's appearance and wearing her outfit. His name Kōmori means bat.

- Nickname: Hades Kōmori (冥土の蝙蝠, Meido no Kōmori)
- Ninpō: Kotsuniku Zaiku - This technique allows Kōmori to shape-shift into any person he wants.
- Ultimate technique:Hōfuku Zettō (報復絶刀) - Kōmori either lunges forward or jumps high to come swinging down hard.

Ginkaku Uneri (宇練 銀閣, Uneri Ginkaku)
Voiced by: Mitsuru Miyamoto
A swordsman who lives in a vast desert in the country of Inaba, he is the second opponent Shichika fights for the Deviant Blades. He wields Namakura, which has been handed down his family for generations, and is unwilling to surrender it to anyone. He has lived in the desert guarding the palace; as he says, "A warrior must live to protect something". His fighting style is solely based on a sword-drawing technique called: Zerosen, which can kill his opponent with one strike, and his katana allows him to do it perfectly. His sword-draw speed is so great that Shichika is never able to see the blade, and he can further increase it by using his own blood. His preferred fighting ground is the very room he stays inside, located within the palace he lives in. He's a depressing figure who wishes to see the land he resides in return to its former beauty when it had once flourished with life, an impossibility according to Togame. He is killed by Shichika after the latter exploits the one weakness in the former's technique, the blind spot directly above his head.

- Ultimate technique:Zantō Gari (斬刀狩り)

Meisai Tsuruga (敦賀 迷彩, Tsuruga Meisai)
Voiced by: Atsuko Yuya
The head of the Sanzu shrine located in Izumo, she is the third opponent Shichika fights for the Deviant Blades. She wields Tsurugi, a thousand exact copies of one sword of Shikizaki's doing. She claims that her real name had been long forgotten. Her current name had been taken from a priest she had killed. She was the daughter of a powerful kendo master who was also a commander of Izumo's defense corps and had died alongside all of his followers. She had later become a bandit leader, inheriting Tsurugi from them. Her killing spree had come to an end after meeting and killing the original Meisai Tsuruga, and she now takes care of a group of mikos that have been abused by men to the point of killing almost any man. The thousand Tsurugi copies are used by her mikos and two bodyguards, and she hopes that the blades' supposed magical properties could cure the abused girls of their dangerous nature, which had worked to a small degree. Despite her willingness to surrender Tsurugi to Togame, she duels Shichika for the sake of the girls. Her fighting style is called Sentouryū, which revolves around using many blades at her disposal, and Tsurugi provides those means. She is killed by Shichika in one last stand after he tells her that she is wielding the real Tsurugi out of the thousand, and that it was fate that had brought her and her sword together. Before dying, she asks Togame a favor: protection from the shogunate over the shrine and the girls, to which Togame agrees.

- Ultimate technique:Chikeikōka Sentō Meguri (地形効果・千刀巡り)

Hakuhei Sabi (錆 白兵, Sabi Hakuhei)
Voiced by: Hikaru Midorikawa
Renowned as one of Japan's strongest swordsmen, he is the fourth opponent Shichika fights for the Deviant Blades. He wields Hakutou Hari, one of the Twelve Blades he was sent to retrieve, but ended up keeping for himself. He proves to be a much more powerful opponent than the others Shichika had fought although their battle is never shown. His catchphrase is "I'll have you fall for me".

- Ultimate technique:Hakutō Kaigan (薄刀開眼; White Sword's Enlightment)

Kanara Azekura (校倉 必, Azekura Kanara)
Voiced by: Tsuyoshi Koyama
A rather tall pirate who rules a small port town in Satsuma, he is the fifth opponent Shichika fights for the Deviant Blades. He wields Yoroi, a suit of armor that he covers his appearance with most of the time and challenges fairly well known individuals with often. He had a younger sister that, when he was younger, was killed along with the other crewmen on the ship they were on by pirates, and was taken in by her killers as a slave. During his stay with them, he was ordered to clean Yoroi, which they had happened to possess at the time. Five years later, he was urged to try on the armor, and used it to turn on his sister's killers. When Shichika and Togame arrived at Kyushu, Kanara saw that Togame resembled his younger sister and strikes a bargain with her: if he dueled Shichika and won, she would be his woman. During his fight against Shichika, the latter has difficulty finding a weak point in Yoroi as it blocks all his attacks. However, he is defeated after Shichika throws him up into the air, and he consequently crashes into the ground, which makes him the first survivor of Shichika's battles over one of the Twelve Blades. Out of spite for his defeat, he secretly has the ship Shichika and Togame board change its course to Ezo.

- Ultimate technique:Touzoku Kamome (刀賊鴎)

Konayuki Itezora (凍空 こなゆき, Itezora Konayuki)
Voiced by: Rina Hidaka
A small eleven-year-old girl who's the last of the Itezora clan located on Mount Odori in the Ezo region, she is the sixth opponent Shichika fights for the Deviant Blades. After meeting a lost and freezing Shichika and Togame and taking them to her makeshift home, Konayuki helps them find, and later wields, Kanazuchi, a sword that is too heavy for Shichika to lift and that she recalls was owned by the village mayor's son. Her appearance is that of a cute young girl with long white hair, a tooth missing, and, despite being the weakest of her entire village even amongst the children, enough strength to effortlessly wield Kanazuchi. She claims that an avalanche had wiped out her clan, but they are revealed to have been killed off by Nanami in the latter's search for the Twelve Blades. She also claims that, as per her clan's instructions, she has to be dueled for Kanazuchi. Unwilling to kill her, Shichika goes easy on Konayuki, but she, with Kanazuchi and her amateur status, manages to break his left arm during the fight, ending the duel and thus being the first to hand Shichika defeat in the search for the Twelve Blades. While Shichika was recovering, Konayuki attacks Kyōken Maniwa, who later possesses her and uses her body to fight Shichika and Togame, but Shichika manages to kill the spirit rather than Konayuki, which knocks Konayuki out. She apologizes to Shichika and Togame for lying to them about dueling her for Kanazuchi, agrees to take it to the mainland and afterward live in the Sanzu shrine, and tells them that she had fun with them and won't feel lonely anymore.

- Ultimate technique:Soutō no Inu (双刀之犬)

Nanami Yasuri (鑢 七実, Yasuri Nanami)
Voiced by: Mai Nakahara
Shichika's older sister, she is the seventh opponent Shichika fights for the Deviant Blades. She's depicted as gentle and weak; however, she can be frightening and intimidating to face during a fight. Despite not learning her family's fighting style, she has keen senses, fast reflexes, and the ability to think ahead, as she had observed her brother during his training and is shown to have used Kyotō when attacked by three Maniwa ninjas. Her primary fighting ability is to, by simply observing any fighting technique, learn it, then master it on second observation. She also has an unnatural ability to recover from serious injuries and poisons. Although her brother leaves the island with Togame, Nanami eventually follows them. She had fought Shichika only once, which ended in a draw because of her body's condition, and is stated by Shichika to be even stronger than Hakuhei. During her travels, she killed off the Itezora clan in search of Kanazuchi, but she did not take it because the sword was not useful to her. She comes into possession of Bita after killing off the people in Shireizan. The katana is later seen stabbed into her chest, which overcomes her physical weakness. She later confronts her brother and asks him to kill her so she could die normally, which is impossible due to her unnatural superhuman strength. In the end, she's killed by her brother, granting her the death she always wanted.

- Ultimate technique:Akutō Shichimi (悪刀七実)

Biyorigō (日和号, Biyorigō)
Voiced by: Aya Endo
The name given to the katana Kanzashi, it fights Shichika in Volume 8 and Episode 8. It resides in an abandoned lake, attacking all that seem to threaten it. It's frightfully fast, flexible, and armed with numerous blades, and it also has a blade hidden in its mouth. Throughout the episode Togame tries to study its behavior as it only roams about through the deserted lake area. Despite their traps its fast thinking kicks in and is unaffected. Later confrontation, Shichika fights it, but proves to be a hassle as it blocks his attacks and surprises him with its unusual attack patterns. In one final attempt it uses its legs to propel itself into the air and attacks them from the sky. But Togame, foreseeing the lack of sunlight forces Biyorigō to shut down and is rescued by Shichika before crashing down onto the ground. The doll is later sent to Princess Hitei.

- Ultimate technique:Bifū Tōfū (微風刀風)

Zanki Kiguchi (汽口 慚愧, Kiguchi Zanki)
Voiced by: Shizuka Itō
A girl with black hair and a distinct lock on the left side of her face that has the appearance of a katana edge who runs a dojo. She's a calm, serious individual and a shogi player. She wields Nokogiri, a wooden sword also known as the King Sword. When first encountered she's dueled for control over Nokogiri, but she wins against Shichika due to the agreement they would both fight using wooden swords. She later attempts to train Shichika in kendo, an activity he is unskilled in due to his family's inherent inability to wield a sword of any kind. While training with her they get caught up in a series of misunderstandings from Togame who comes to see progress, suggesting something sexual. Near the end of his training, Shichika is still unable to fight with a sword, but Togame outflanks her by reciting moves in shogi distracting her long enough to have Shichika land a hit. In the end she hands over Nokogiri admitting her loss and revealing a more feminine side before Shichika and Togame depart. She is shown to be proficient in hand-to-hand fighting when she spars with Shichika the day before they leave.

- Ultimate technique:Ōtō Rakudo (王刀楽土)

Rinne Higaki (彼我木 輪廻, Higaki Rinne)
Voiced by: Miyako Itō
Rinne Higaki is a holy man over 300 years old with long greenish-black hair who wears a long scarf-like cloth as clothing, although his real appearance is never revealed. He has the ability to cast illusions and can appear to those who see him as someone from their memories. He appears to Shichika as a young girl and to Togame as her father. He was a friend of Kiki Shikizaki and he received the Seitō Hakari through him. Fearing that the blade's poisonous nature would affect him, he buried it deep underground. He rather enjoys verbally tormenting his victims, but as Shichika and Togame learn a little bit more about themselves through illusions, they eventually retrieve the sword.

- Ultimate technique:Seitō Bōei (誠刀防衛)

Hōō Maniwa (真庭 鳳凰, Maniwa Hōō)
Voiced by: Ryōtarō Okiayu
The acclaimed leader of the Maniwa Ninja Corps and the leader of its Bird Squad. As his name suggests, he wears a phoenix-like uniform. His personality is quite different from his fellow ninja heads, claiming he has a little more common sense then the others. He has the ability to decapitate anyone with a swing of his arm, as shown when he severs his own left arm to form an alliance with Togame, though he regains the use of said lost arm shortly after from Kawauso's corpse. He finds Mekki inside of a cave and takes it. Shortly after claiming it they are caught by Emonzaemon who's out to kill him, but he and Penguin escape leaving Oshidori to fight him. Hōō later became possessed by the spirit of Kiki Shikizaki who then destroys the Maniwa village and proceeds to fight Shichika but is ultimately defeated.

- Nickname: God Hōō (神の鳳凰, Kami no Hōō)
- Ninpō: Danzaien - This technique allows Hōō to slice through anyone with a swing of his arm. This ability was originally called Namagoroshi (生殺し), by the Aioi Corps.
- Ultimate technique:Mōdoku Tōyo (猛毒刀与)

Emonzaemon Sōda (左右田 右衛門左衛門, Sōda Emonzaemon)
Voiced by: Rikiya Koyama
A faithful follower of Princess Hitei, he's been informing her about Togame's adventures for some time. He is seen spying on Togame and Shichika after they recovered Kanazuchi. A rather quiet person who sits in on Princess Hitei's boastful conversations. He shows little emotion and does not get along well with Togame. He has long red hair that's bound in a ponytail and a tall height and wears a tuxedo-like uniform. His face is covered by a mask that was given to him by Princess Hitei and is written with the kanji for "unconcealed" (不忍). He used to be a ninja under the Aioi Corps, a group that was eliminated by the Maniwa Corps over 170 years ago during the Sengoku Period. His ninjutsu revolves around the darkness of his surroundings. His ninja style was overpowered by the early Maniwa ninjas and claims only Hōō is the sole person who knows about the Aioi Corps ways out of the present Maniwa Corps ninjas. He is the only person who has knowledge of Aioi Kempou. He wields Jū, a pair of pistols. Once Togame and Shichika manage to retrieve the other eleven Deviant Swords, he kills Togame and flees with them, later fighting Shichika who wishes to be killed by the same man that killed her, but ends up killed by him and with his last breath, asks the princess to forgive him for dying for her sake. Following his death, Hitei starts wearing his mask as a head ornament.

- Ninpō:Shinobazuhō Ikasazukorosazu, lit. "Unenduring Method: Without Living, Without Killing" (不忍法不生不殺) - This ability is the same as Maniwa Hōō's as he is able to cut through anything. This ability was also known as Namagoroshi.
- Ultimate technique:Danzai Entō (断罪炎刀)

== Maniwa Ninja Corps Heads ==
A clan of ninja that are also looking for the Deviant Blades. The clan is split into four different groups based on the wildlife of their members: Bird Squad, Beast Squad, Fish Squad, and Insect Squad. Their animal name is reflected in their clothing and all members wear a chain somewhere on their uniform. Shichika and Nanami nicknamed the clan "Maniwani", thinking it made them sound cute. Both the clan and their village was destroyed by Hōō Maniwa who became possessed by the spirit of Kiki Shikizaki after he obtained the Deviant Blade Mekki.

No.	Name	Animal	Squad	Notes
1	Hōō Maniwa	Phoenix	Bird	Leader of the Bird Squad and head of the Maniwani
2	Shirasagi Maniwa	Heron	Bird	
3	Oshidori Maniwa	Duck	Bird	
4	Kawauso Maniwa	Otter	Beast	Leader of the Beast Squad
5	Komori Maniwa	Bat	Beast	
6	Kyōken Maniwa	Wolf	Beast	
7	Umigame Maniwa	Sea Turtle	Fish	Leader of the Fish Squad
8	Kuizame Maniwa	Fish	Fish	
9	Pengin Maniwa	Penguin	Fish	
10	Kamakiri Maniwa	Mantis	Insect	Leader of the Insect Squad
11	Chōchō Maniwa	Butterfly	Insect	
12	Mitsubachi Maniwa	Bee	Insect	

Shirasagi Maniwa (真庭 白鷺, Maniwa Shirasagi)
Voiced by: Wataru Hatano
A member of the Bird Squad, not much is known about him except what has been heard of him. He speaks everything backwards. As his name suggests, he wears a white heron-like uniform. He is killed by Ginkaku before he has the chance to take any action.

- Nickname: Reverse-talk Shirasagi (逆さ喋りの白鷺, Sakasashaberi no Shirasagi)
- Ninpō: Gekirin Sagashi

Oshidori Maniwa (真庭 鴛鴦, Maniwa Oshidori)
Voiced by: Kaori Yamagata
A member of the Bird Squad, she is first mentioned as the object of Chōchō's affection. As her name suggests, she wears a duck-like uniform. She fights Emonzaemon while letting her leader and Penguin flee. Her Ninpō proves to be a hassle for him as he cannot sneak up on her. But she's later gunned down by Jū, which were in Emonzaemon's possession at the time.

- Nickname: Rewind Oshidori (巻戻しの鴛鴦, Makimodoshi no Oshidori)
- Ninpō: Eigouben - This technique allows her to swing her whips freely, and control them with freedom, form either a defense mechanism, or offense.

Kawauso Maniwa (真庭 川獺, Maniwa Kawauso)
Voiced by: Shinji Kawada
The leader of the Beast Squad, he is invaluable to the Maniwa Corps as he can ascertain the locations of the Deviant Blades. As his name suggests, he wears an otter-like uniform. He is willingly killed by Hōō in order to maintain the alliance between the Maniwa Corps and Togame.

- Nickname: Read Kawauso (読み調べの川獺, Yomishirabe no Kawauso)
- Ninpō: Kiroku Tadori - This technique is a form of psychometry that allows Kawauso to read the past of almost any inanimate object. However, he admits that his reading skills don't allow him to read other people's memories due to his shyness.

Kyōken Maniwa (真庭 狂犬, Maniwa Kyōken)
Voiced by: Michiko Neya
A member of the Beast Squad, she despises Togame for the deaths of her fellow ninja and the mess they've caused within the Maniwa village. As her name suggests, she wears a wolf-like uniform. Hōō reveals that the current Kyōken is actually the spirit of the first Kyōken Maniwa that had died long ago. She is initially defeated by Konayuki, but she later takes over Konayuki, reads her memories, and uses her body to fight Shichika and Togame, stating that she has had over 2000 hosts in her lifetime, most of them being female ninja, and a vast amount of fighting experience. She is defeated by Shichika and loses control over Konayuki's body after he realizes that Kyōken's fighting experience is the reason he can now read the movements of Konayuki's body, in sharp contrast to Konayuki's amateur status.

- Nickname: Infest Kyōken (伝染の狂犬, Densen no Kyōken)
- Ninpō: Kyōken Hatsudou - This technique, secretive to the point that even the leader of the Beast Squad, Kawauso didn't know, allows Kyōken to take control, and read the memories of any host. Hōō reveals that the new host must be female.

Umigame Maniwa (真庭 海亀, Maniwa Umigame)
Voiced by: Toshihiko Seki
The leader of the Fish Squad, as his name suggests, he wears a turtle-like uniform. He wields a rapier. He fights Emonzaemon and is killed.

- Nickname: Longevity Umigame (長寿の海亀, Chōju no Umigame)

Kuizame Maniwa (真庭 喰鮫, Maniwa Kuizame)
Voiced by: Tomohiro Tsuboi
A member of the Fish Squad, he wields a pair of chains, a sword attached to each one. After overhearing Meisai asking Shichika about what the latter fought for, Kuizame admits proudly that he himself fights for money and nothing else. He is killed by Meisai after she bypasses his Ninpō. He is later revealed to have respected Kamakiri despite being practically a murderer in a ninja outfit, according to Chōchō.

- Nickname: Chain-bind Kuizame (鎖縛の喰鮫, Sabaku no Kuizame)
- Ninpō: Uzugatana - This technique allows Kuizame to swing his sword-tipped chains around him effortlessly.

Pengin Maniwa (真庭 人鳥, Maniwa Pengin)
Voiced by: Ryō Hirohashi
A member of the Fish Squad, he is the group's informant and its youngest head. As his name suggests, he wears a penguin-like uniform. A shy and soft-spoken boy, he stutters when trying to bring something up. He's later killed by Emonzaemon in pursuit of Shichika and Togame.

- Nickname: Propagate Pengin (増殖の人鳥, Zōshoku no Pengin)
- Ninpō: Fate Ruination - This increases the "luck" he has, to the extent of defying logical standards.

Kamakiri Maniwa (真庭 蟷螂, Maniwa Kamakiri)
Voiced by: Makoto Yasumura
The leader of the Insect Squad, he is a serious highly experienced and feared warrior. As his name suggests, he wears a praying mantis-like uniform. He and the rest of the Insect Squad go to the island of the Yasuri family in order to kidnap Nanami and find out what happened to Kōmori. He acts not only as the leader, but also as an older brother and good friend for his Insect Squad comrades. While stalking Nanami, Kamakiri confesses to himself that if she weren't a target/enemy, Mitsubachi would probably fall for her. He is the first to attack Nanami in hopes of using her as a hostage/bargaining piece, but is quickly defeated. He is subsequently killed by Nanami shoving his own large nails, which she tore off his fingers, through his mouth after he refused to tell her any info about his fellow ninja.

- Nickname: Decapitate Kamakiri (首狩りの蟷螂, Kubikari no Kamakiri)
- Ninpō: Tsume Awase - This technique allows Kamakiri to lengthen and strengthen his nails into powerful claws.

Chōchō Maniwa (真庭 蝶々, Maniwa Chōchō)
Voiced by: Daisuke Sakaguchi
A member of the Insect Squad, he is a little hotheaded and quick to lose his patience especially when it comes to games, accusing others of cheating. As his name suggests, he wears a butterfly-like uniform. Chōchō admires Kamakiri as a great leader and considers both Kamakiri and Mitsubachi as very good friends. He was a heavy smoker and gave up smoking for the sake of Oshidori, who he is going to marry at some point, but he is killed before he could confess his love for her. He is the second person who fights Nanami after Kamakiri, using his Ninpō both to gain the advantage and to experience the thrill of fighting that the respective founders of both his and Nanami's styles had experienced long ago, but is killed by her after she copied his Ninpō, used both his and Kamakiri's Ninpōs against him, pinned him to the ground, and broke his neck. In the light novel he was originally called Maniwa Tefutefu, the kanjis used for his name can be pronounced either way.

- Nickname: Weightless Chōchō (無重の蝶々, Mujū no Chōchō)
- Ninpō: Ashigaru - This technique allows Chōchō to make his body weightless, thus increasing his speed and rendering him unhittable. He can also use it to skate on water even with the additional weight of both Kamakiri and Mitsubachi on his shoulders.

Mitsubachi Maniwa (真庭 蜜蜂, Maniwa Mitsubachi)
Voiced by: Hiroaki Miura
A member of the Insect Squad, he is the most gentle, fair, and calm of its three members, preferring to avoid conflicts with his friends. As his name suggests, he wears a honey bee-like uniform. Besides being the tallest of the squad, he is also the youngest among them and is the only member among them that carries and uses man-made weapons. After witnessing Nanami killing Chōchō, Mitsubachi is the third person who fights Nanami, attacking her from behind and at a distance using his Ninpō in order to weaken and subsequently capture her or finish her off. His own Ninpō is also used against him after he realized too late that her body can survive from non-lethal poison, and he allowed her to see, then copy his Ninpō. By using Ashigaru and Tsume Awase, she was able to dig out the caltrops and quickly attack him. He asks her to kill him with his own sword so that he wouldn't die in shame by the poison she found in Kamakiri's molar and used in her counterattack, and bury his corpse alongside his fellow ninja, both of which she fulfills.

- Nickname: Thorn Mitsubachi (棘々の蜜蜂, Togetoge no Mitsubachi)
- Ninpō: Makibishi Shidan - This technique allows him to launch small caltrops that are hook-tipped to make pulling them out impossible and poison-tipped to immobilize his enemy so that he can get in close and kill them with his katana.

== Yanari Shogunate Retainers ==
A group of eleven individuals under direct command of the Yanari Shogun who joined Emonzaemon forming a gauntlet to prevent Shichika from reaching the Shogun himself, each armed with one of the twelve deviant blades.

Hannyamaru (般若丸, Hannyamaru)
Voiced by: Shōgo Matsui
The first retainer encountered by Shichika. He is a strangely keen-eyed man, who wears his bangs tied up, and has a mask representing something of demonic mouth. He wields Zettō Kanna.
Furachi Oniyadori (鬼宿 不埒, Oniyadori Furachi)
Voiced by: Hirokazu Miyahara
The second retainer encountered on the ascent, he is a bald man with triangular patterns tattooed to his jaw. He holds his hand up in a form of prayer. He wields Zantō Namakura.
Akatsuki Tomoe (巴 暁, Tomoe Akatsuki)
Voiced by: Miwako Suguro
The third retainer, a girl with tied up black hair and an eye-patch. By stabbing all of Sentō Tsurugi's blades onto the floor, she illuminated the entire room. However, she is defeated by Shichika using the same technique he used on Tsuruga Meisai.
Matsuaki Fugi (浮義 待秋, Fugi Matsuaki)
Voiced by: Kenzi Takahashi
Fourth retainer, he was a rival to Hakuhei Sabi, and had always failed to surpass him. A man who with white pulled back hair and large, red eyes, resembles a Kabuki actor. He wields Hakutō Hari and is rather arrogant thinking he can surpass Shichika, for killing Hakuhei Sabi. He is defeated due to Hakutō Hari's flaw of being easily breakable when not swung at a perfect arc.
Kairo Iga (伊賀 甲斐路, Iga Kairo)
Voiced by: Hiroo Sasaki
The fifth retainer. A former ninja from the same group as Emonzaemon who used a muscle ninjutsu to wield Zokutō Yoroi. He was defeated by being lifted off the ground, and hit again, to destroy him and his armor, by Shichika.
Bōfura Maniwa (真庭 孑々, Maniwa Bōfura)
Voiced by: Takuya Eguchi
Sixth retainer. His ancestors defected from the Maniwa Ninja Corps 200 years ago. He uses a variant of Ashigaru that allows him to negate the weight of Kanazuchi thus enabling him to spin it around his finger freely. This also negates the strength of Kanazuchi, however, allowing Shichika to block its swings with ease.
Uron (胡乱, Uron)
Voiced by: Taira Kikumoto
Seventh retainer. A man who wears western glasses. He claims to have become immortal because Akutō Bita was combined with his perfect health, but is easily defeated by Shichika who dealt enough blows to kill him 272 times within 5 seconds, in a similar fashion as his sister Nanami.
Ō Haiga (灰賀 欧, Haiga Ō)
Voiced by: Yūko Gibu
Eighth retainer. A tall woman who has long greenish-black hair and uses a claw for a weapon. She claims to be able to unleash the full power of Biyorigō, but dies due to her blocking Biyorigō's path when they attacked Shichika at the same time.
Kokubo Sumigaoka (墨ヶ丘 黒母, Sumigaoka Kokubo)
Voiced by: Masato Kokubun
Ninth retainer. A man with a stern look on his face. He was commonly known as the Owari Savage. He explained the pointlessness of war to Shichika and tried to persuade him to retreat, but Shichika found his words meaningless and defeats him without hesitation. He wields Outō Nokogiri.
Kōsha Saraba (皿場 工舎, Saraba Kōsha)
Voiced by: Saori Hayami
Tenth retainer. A small girl with a look of depression, she admits her sword - Seitō Hakari - is useless, and Shichika suggests to throw it at him, which he deflects, knocking her out and making her the only retainer who survived his assault.
Bangai Rogiri (呂桐 番外, Rogiri Bangai)
Voiced by: Hayato Nakata
The eleventh retainer. He was a man who lost all ego, and was consumed by the poison of Mekki. A well-built man with long red hair bound into a ponytail and grey skin. He is killed by Shichika with a single strike.

== Other characters ==
Takahito Hida (飛弾 鷹比等, Hida Takahito)
Voiced by: Tokuyoshi Kawashima
Takahito was the Togame's late father and the leader of the last rebellion against the Owari Shogunate. He realized the plan of Kiki Shikizaki was to alter history, so he spent his life trying to restore it, thus creating the rebellion. He failed however, resulting in his death at the hands of Yasuri Mutsue at Hida Castle in front of the young Togame. This turned her hair white and inspired her to collect the deviant blades. His very last words to Togame was that he loved her very much.
Mutsue Yasuri (鑢 六枝, Yasuri Mutsue)
Voiced by: Tōru Ōkawa
The sixth head of the Kyotōryū school of Japanese sword martial arts, he was the late father of Shichika and Nanami and the person Togame was initially seeking for the mission to find the Deviant Blades. After killing Takahito, Mutsue and his family were exiled to the uninhabited island of Fushou in Tanba Province. He is later revealed to have attempted to restrain Nanami's power and denied her succession to the Kyotōryū. This was not because of her gender or frailty, but because he was simply unable to raise such an exceptionally powerful individual who had the same eyes as those of his father. After training Shichika in the Kyotōryū to become his successor, Mutsue requested that Shichika kill him, which Shichika did.
Kazune Yasuri (鑢 一根, Yasuri Kazune)
Voiced by: Atsushi Abe
Shichika's ancestor in the Sengoku period. Although not particularly skilled with a sword, he became the founder of Kyotōryū with the help of Kiki Shikizaki.
Kiki Shikizaki (四季崎 記紀, Shikizaki Kiki)
Voiced by: Katsuji Mori
A master swordsmith, and soothsayer of the Sengoku period who was reclusive and belonged to no house nor country. His work was regarded so highly that during this period, 1000 of his swords were distributed over 25 countries and that the country with the most of his swords during that time dominated it. Of those 1000 swords, the first 988 he created are believed to have been practice for the last twelve weapons: the Deviant Blades. He made use of alchemy and the occult, to create these weapons, each markedly different from each other, drawing on technologies he saw in the future. He befriended Shichika's ancestor, Kazune Yasuri, and helped him to establish the Kyotōryū style, the purpose of which was to help his descendant Shichika perfect the Kyotōryū style and forge himself as the Ultimate Deviant Blade.
In episode 11 of the anime, it was revealed that Shikizaki's true intentions for creating the 12 Deviant Blades and Kyotōryū, were to falsify history and destroy the Owari Shoganate. He was doing this for the sake of Japan, as one of his ancestors had a vision that Japan will perish at the hands of foreigners. Togane's father realized what Shikizaki had planned which is why he created to rebellion, to change history back to its original path.
Princess Hitei (否定姫, Hitei Hime; lit. 'Princess Denial')
Voiced by: Haruka Tomatsu
A princess residing in Owari who has recently come back into power. She's a beautiful, well endowed lady with long blonde hair and bluish-green eyes. She also has the shinobi, Emonzaemon under her control whom she often looks down upon and demeans even though he appears unfazed by it. Throughout the series, she actively plots against Togame, gains Jū under her possession, and is revealed to be a descendant of Kiki Shikizaki whose goal she seems to be either trying to fulfill or prevent. Toward the end of the story it is revealed that she does not actually dislike Togame, but just finds her unpleasant. At the conclusion of the series, she cuts her hair short, and decides to follow Shichika and support him financially as he travels around Japan.
