= List of C3 characters =

The following is a list of characters from the series C^{3} novel series, also known as C Cube (シーキューブ, Shīkyūbu).

== Main characters ==
Haruaki Yachi (夜知 春亮, Yachi Haruaki)
Voiced by: Yuki Kaji
A male student at Taishu High School. His father has a habit of sending him Cursed artifacts to remove the curses within, as their home is in a blessed location, a focal point for positive energy which gradually removes curses, and thus makes him immune to any curses. Due to the fact that his mother was never seen or mentioned in the series and his father is traveling, he developed a talent in cooking and is highly independent. He has a very stubborn but friendly personality, and does not hesitate when it comes to protecting his friends. Haruaki is somewhat aware of all the girls' feelings towards him, but never acts upon taking steps towards a serious relationship with any of them.
Fear Kubrick (フィア・キューブリック, Fia Kyūburikku; also "Fear Cubrick")
Voiced by: Yukari Tamura
A girl with a Cursed Tool, whose full name is Fear-In-Cube, a torture device resembling a solid metal cube. Fear-In-Cube has 32 torture capabilities which include an Iron maiden, and a Guillotine among other things. Fear was developed during the height of the Inquisitions, and has caused countless people's agonizing deaths to the point where she risks going homicidally insane upon hearing someone scream in pain. Eventually she developed a curse of her own, causing anyone who owns her to go insane, driving the owner to want to use her to torture people and revel in their pain and screams. Due to her extended time in the depths of a Spanish castle Fear has also developed animosity for spiders, as they would build cobwebs around her original form. Out of disgust at her past, Fear prefers to stay in human form. She regards Haruaki as her owner, and her anxiety is eased by his assurances that her curse can not affect him. Fear's torture abilities are over time neutralized by things called indulgence disks which hare found in other cursed tools. She appears to have a developing crush towards Haruaki but responds to him in a Tsundere type of way when she gets shy. Fear's favorite catchphrase is "I'll curse you", and has an addiction to rice crackers.
Konoha Muramasa (村正 このは, Muramasa Konoha)
Voiced by: Minori Chihara
A long resident at the Yachi compound, Konoha is also a Cursed Tool in the true form of a katana. In human form, she still retains her powers of slicing clean through objects, which are her sword characteristics. Her curse towards her owner differs between adaptations but does not play an essential role in the story due to Haruaki's immunity to curses. Konoha's status as a Cursed Tool has almost been lifted, but when she sees blood for an extended period of time a relapse can occur towards a blood-thirsty personality with blue hair and eyes similar to Fear. Konoha tends more though to faint at the sight of blood as a result of hypnosis that was self induced in order to keep her blood lust from overwhelming her. She also wears special glasses to help block her vision of too much blood. Little is known of her history before the start of the story other than she is a childhood friend to Haruaki. He sometimes calls her "onee-san" (older sister) as he did when they were kids in order to obtain a special favor from her. To the outside world she and Haruaki are related cousins, and she goes to a different classroom than him. She doesn't get along well with Fear whom she refers to as a "child", and is jealous when she gets too close to Haraki due to Konoha's crush on him. She is also aware that Kirika not only loves but is a rival for him.
Kirika Ueno (上野 錐霞, Ueno Kirika)
Voiced by: Eri Kitamura
Haruaki's classmate and the Student Council President. She is in possession of two Cursed Tools, one called Ginistrang's Love, and the other The River of Black Strings (or Tragic Black River). Both of these tools give her advantages in battle including the ability to not be killed by a fatal injury, though in exchange they come with terrible effects. She will die if she ever removes Ginistrang's Love which looks like a bdsm-style outfit, as for the other tool she satisfies the curse by using herself as a victim since the bondage suit will heal the injuries that Black River inflicts. Kirika feels disgusted with her body as she did not choose to have these cursed items placed upon her. She is also a reluctant member of a group founded by her older brother that has more than one name depending on the adaptation. This group studies and researches Cursed Tools as the ultimate mysteries to explore. She has a crush on Haruaki, and often competes with him over whose cooking is better during lunch period. He later finds out about her Cursed Tools, and what she must do in order to satisfy the curse of Black River. He isn't bothered by it though, and the trust further strengthens their relationship. Kirika's catchphrase is "Absolutely ridiculous!" which she uses on more than one occasion.
Kuroe Ningyouhara (人形原 黒繪, Ningyōhara Kuroe)
Voiced by: Yui Ogura
A Cursed Tool in the form of a doll who has recently returned to Haruaki's house. She is a Japanese doll with extendible hair, and chose the 'e' kanji of her name to give the impression of "pretty as a picture". Kuroe has a very friendly and calm personality but usually seems emotionless, those that know her well though like Haruaki, can tell if she is feeling a particular emotion. She can freely control her hair like tentacles or hands for many purposes such as moving things or healing others using her life energy. She recharges by running a salon where she cuts peoples hair and then feeds on the residual life energy inherent in the cut hair after closing, partly to keep her life energy up and partly because she finds the hair delicious. Due to the trust and thanks from her customers and fellow shopkeepers she has completely removed her curse. Her original curse was that she would attempt to steal her owners' life energy at night by cutting off bits of their hair, and absorbing it until they died. It is shown that Kuroe finds amusement in her practical jokes and playful flirting towards Haruaki.

== Taishuu High School ==
Gabriel Sekaibashi (世界橋 ガブリエル, Sekaibashi Gaburieru)
Voiced by: Shūichi Ikeda
The eccentric superintendent of Taishuu High School who wears a gas mask over his face for unknown reasons. Gabriel constantly spins different stories as to why he wears the mask, but Fear and Shiraho just think he is perverted. Volume 8 of the Light Novels reveals the reason he wears the mask along with the fact that he feels nervous without it after having worn it for so long. He is a busy person, allowed the freedom to do many things besides show up to run the school. Usually he is off on travel and rarely in the office. When first seen in Vol. 2 he had only gotten back to the school at 11:00 am, and had to catch a flight on another trip that afternoon; he would return in a week. His interest is in collecting what he thinks are cursed objects, however he claims that Haruaki's father is far ahead of him in identifying them. He is currently looking for a way to heal and bring back to life a destroyed Cursed Tool due to a past incident with the Draconians. This prompts him to go on numerous trips seeking Cursed Tools but usually getting junk as he can't identify whether something is a Cursed Tool or not. Due to the incident his health is poor so while he can do one strong attack he is completely wiped out and would be unable to do anything other than walk away after the one attack. Zenon and her sister have been his subordinates since before the incident. He is very skilled with throwing things and seems to have a lot of clout and pull with important people in the city.
Zenon Houjou (北条 漸音, Hōjō Zenon)
Voiced by: Ai Orikasa
The superintendent's secretary who manages the office when he is absent. She has a deadpan personality. However, she has a soft spot for cute things, as her cellphone ringtone is a jingle in the series' fictional children's show called "Meow Meow Paradise Hell". She has a strong interest in cute things, especially outfits, whether for herself or someone else (like Fear or Sovereignty) and tries to hide this from others. Unfortunately for her, her figure and appearance is better suited for mature, serious, business type outfits rather than cute things. She is skilled with throwing knives and was also involved with Gabriel's incident with the Draconians. A running gag involves her letter of resignation. In the first example, after the trunk she had custody of proved empty, Gabriel mused about docking her pay, but since he had a camera handy proposed taking a picture of her smiling instead. She then pulled a Letter of Resignation with intent to use it, and declared that her severance pay could be swinging her fist at him. Gabriel declared he was just joking, and she put the letter back in her pocket. She is aware of the existence of Cursed Tools along with the fact that Konoha, Fear and Sovereignty are Cursed Tools as well as Kirika's and Izoey's involvement with Lab Chief's Nation.
Ganon Houjou (北条 ガノン, Hōjō Ganon)
Voiced by: Kotono Mitsuishi
The procrastinating school nurse of Taishuu High School, who is Zenon's sister. Has developed her own method of fighting that resembles Drunken Mastery which makes it seem she is doing one thing while actually doing the exact opposite such as appearing to be withdrawing while actually attacking and vice versa. Likes to sleep and drink while finding any activity to be too bothersome and tiring. Although when need be she can actually be reliable occasionally such as giving Haruaki a 10,000 Yen bill, calling a taxi and giving him Kirika's address after she fainted. Like her sister, she is aware of the existence of Cursed Tools along with the fact that Konoha, Fear and Sovereignty are Cursed Tools as well as Kirika's and Izoey's involvement with Lab Chief's Nation.
Shiraho Sakuramairi (桜参 白穂, Sakuramairi Shiraho)
Voiced by: Chiwa Saitō
A former talented performer in a famous theatrical group whose family owns an antique shop. She is lonely and cold-hearted and likens herself to a 'doll', but after Sovereignty addressed her during one of her wanderings in the antique shop she takes a liking to him, asking from the first "Can dolls fall in love?". In the novel, volume 2, she is first seen at the door of an empty classroom. Haruaki, Konoha and Fear mistake her for Sovereignty, and she chooses to use that mistake to her advantage. She was found out when Haruaki and Fear check her medical form at the school nurse's office. Shiraho was enrolled but never attended classes at Haruaki's high school up until Sovereignty got his/her Killing Organ destroyed. After that, as part of the punishment for all the trouble they caused she has to attend school normally. While her grades are terrible she is a top class actress who can capture an audience's attention with her exceptional performance even if she had no time to prepare or rehearse beforehand. Her personality is still cold from being treated as a doll by her mother to perform on stage, being highly praised for performances she put minimal effort into, and talks like she is a doll and humans are beneath her. Although she has lightened up somewhat and able to talk to Haruaki's group fairly normally, it's still with scathing remarks and treating Haruaki as a miserable excuse for a human whose only value to the world would be dying. She still loves and lives with Sovereignty despite the curse still being present. Even though Sovereignty's curse makes the owner fall in love with him/her she doesn't want to relinquish ownership so her love for Sovereignty won't decrease at all in case some or all of her love for Sovereignty is from the curse. She is one of the few female characters of Haruaki's age group not head over heels in love with him.
Sovereignty (サヴェレンティ, Saverenti)
Voiced by: Yuka Iguchi
The true name is Sovereignty-Perfection-Doll. An androgynous cursed doll (which Shiraho refers to as a male) whose curse causes them owner to fall in love with them unto death. Is able to appear as a beautiful boy with blue hair and eyes or a cute girl with pink hair and eyes. Sovereignty says the female form can decrease and increase the size of her breasts by having them rubbed, and in the Light Novel used this on self the first time Haruaki and the rest witnessed Sovereignty change from male to female. They possess a killing mechanism called Killing Organ with blades hidden in their body, specially designed to activate only when the Killing Organ detects a certain level of love from the owner which activates "Last Embrace." Last Embrace is where Sovereignty unwillingly embraces his/her owner while numerous blades pop out to kill the owner. This was because their creator had wanted to create the most perfect doll for any owner, (hence the ability to switch genders as some people prefer other female and male dolls for various reasons) but before finishing went insane and included the Killing Organ and blades in order to have the "perfect doll" bring a conclusive "end" to the romance between doll and owner. While they manage to resist the urge to kill somewhat, it gets harder and harder the more love between the two exists until they cannot stop the Killing Organ from killing the owner. Sovereignty is able to confuse the Killing Organ somewhat by taking the strong feelings of love from others causing the victims to faint and suffer a condition similar to anemia, although being with or touching the person they love speeds their recovery. Sovereignty also has the ability to control "replicas of life". This can control anything vaguely humanoid, whether a bent bedframe, Cursed Tool in Human Form (if the Tool cooperates and doesn't resist,) straw dolls, skeleton and anatomical models, puppets, etc.
Konoha used her special ability to destroy the Killing Organ and break all the knives after Fear staged a performance in order to fully draw out all of the knives. Afterwards Sovereignty still loves and lives with Shiraho. Sovereignty is still cursed. As feelings of love accumulate Sovereignty must embrace Shiraho. With the Killing Organ excised it is not fatal, and the curse is sufficiently satisfied that Sovereignty can let go, instead of embracing Shiraho forever. Shiraho calls it a curse to hug. The Superintendent's requirement for Sovereignty is that she must work as the Secretary's (Zenon's) Assistant, doing and wearing what Zenon directs; her first job is to dress as a maid and serve tea treats. In the anime she is a major klutz. In the light novel, she shows a mix of klutz and poise, tripping and falling on her face while serving tea treats, yet holding onto the tray so that only one cream puff was lost. Because of her job she is obliged to be female on the job and at school. She apparently carries the obligation over to her dealings with Haruaki's household. During a side story with a stalker it seems that while Sovereignty loves Shiraho most, they might develop feelings for Haruaki.
Taizo Hakuto (伯途 泰造, Hakuto Taizō)
Voiced by: Takuma Terashima
Haruaki's friend and classmate. While not as eccentric as Kana, Taizo gets extremely jealous when he discovers Fear is living with Haruaki. Has a bit of a crush on Konoha and completely unaware of the existence of Cursed Tools. Is one of the judges for Haruaki's and Kirika's lunch battles.
Kana Miyama (実耶麻 渦奈, Miyama Kana)
Voiced by: Kana Asumi
One of Haruaki's classmates. She takes an instant liking to Fear, constantly obsessing over her like she's a cute animal. Kana served as class captain of the dance team for the upcoming sports festival. She is completely unaware of the existence of Cursed Tools much less the fact that Fear and Konoha are Cursed Tools. She is one of the judges for Haruaki's and Kirika's lunch battles.

== Antagonists ==
Peavey Barowoi (ピーヴィー・バロヲイ, Pīvī Barōi)
Voiced by: Sayaka Ohara
Known as the Balancing Toy, Peavey is a member of the Battlefront Collection Knights. Because of a traumatic childhood experience Peavey became a masochistic, violent woman. In the novels it involved her father bringing home a cursed whip from an antique store. In the anime it involved a serial killer slaughtering her family with a Wathe (later revealed to be Ueno's "River of Black Strings"). Her only goal in life is to destroy all cursed tools, hence why she joined the Battlefront Collection Knights. Even Mummy Maker states that Peavey has by far the most hatred for Cursed Tools out of anyone in the organization. She has a habit of calling out Bitch and is a heavy smoker. Peavey is eventually captured by Ueno after she attacks Haruaki and company for the second time. She is the principal antagonist of the novel volume 1. Her first weapon is a powerful machine armor for her arms that's similar to a Cursed Tool, but not cursed that greatly increases her arm strength so she can smash concrete with one punch, however, using causes severe damage to her arms in the process. Also, it's extremely heavy causing her to wobble when moving earning her the nickname "Balancing Toy." The second weapon after losing an arm and half the armor is a Cursed Tool called "Dance Time." It's an Ax that can replicate every swing or blow it's ever made, or make illusions to strike different blows at the same time as the real one. However, it keeps swinging on its own once it starts on its own and requires it to be used to murder someone before its special abilities can be used. In the Light Novels and Anime Peavey only uses it as a last resort but is so sickened mentally using it that she has to pause to throw up a few times.
Amanda Carlot (アマンダ・カーロット, Amanda Kārotto) a.k.a. Mummy Maker (マミーメーカー, Mamī Mēkā)
Voiced by: MAKO
An Auxiliary who often speaks like a machine, Mummy Maker aids Peavey in her missions. She is attired in a bandage, like a mummy, wearing a mantle over it. The bandage is a worst called 'chupacabra bandage' and has wound-closing healing powers, but at the cost of painfully sucking blood from the persons bandaged. Mummy-maker has burns over half her body because her parents had locked her in a closet while setting the house on fire for the insurance money. After being rescued her mother tried to strangle her in the hospital screaming "Why didn't you die, now we can't collect on the Insurance!" In return for affection Peavey showed her she attempted to convince Haruaki to either turn over Fear to the Battlefront Collection Knights, or to not interfere when Peavey returns to destroy her. This was all to protect Peavey, the first person to ever treat her kindly as most people are sickened or afraid to get near her due to her burns. After being tricked over Amanda's intentions Peavey kills her in a rage, claiming there is no compromise and that she will have revenge. In the Light Novels it's discovered that while on the brink of death, Amanda survived but is broken mentally.
Alice Vivolio Basskreigh (アリス・ビブオーリオ・バスクリッハ, Arisu Bibuōrio Basukurihha)
Voiced by: Rie Tanaka
Alice, also known as the "Mother of Canonical" or "Matriarch", is the founder of the Vivolio Family, an organization that adores the curses of the Wathe and believes that they were saved by Wathe. And to affirm a Wathe's existence it shouldn't hold back on embracing their curses or any impulses they have, even if it results in death. If a Wathe's curse drives someone mad it should happily drive them mad, if they have urges or hatred they should act on them without holding back even if it means killing or torturing someone to death. In fact, the members embrace this so much that they consider it an honor to sacrifice their lives to Wathe and are even willing to help secure victims according to a Wathe's preferences. Alice originally hoped to talk Kuroe into joining the Vivolio family, but after she discovers Fear in Cube she turns her attention to making Fear join the Vivolio family instead. Alice carries two cursed tools: Carnival Cooker and Suicidal-Beautification-Mirror. The Carnival Cooker, in spite of its name, more closely resembles a combined butcher's knife and meat tenderizer. It can remember any action it has taken and repetitively reenact the process again, in a very rapid succession that almost overwhelms Fear. The Mirror has three uses: the ability to make the user beautiful, render a target immobile and create countless clones of the owner and anything they're carrying (except the mirror.) The drawbacks to using the mirror is that Alice must cut herself on the wrist every once in a while, and the clones only last for 10 minutes from the moment they came into being. The drawback to Carnival Cooker is that since it was used to chop up and cook human bodies, its curse forces the user to want to kill and eat people. Alice often hides Carnival Cooker inside a massive viola, as she claims it would attract too much attention from the police if she walked around with it in the open. She has no conscience as she is the owner of Abyss (true form a large cross,) a.k.a. the Patriarch, whose curse completely suppresses the conscience of his owner allowing them to do anything they desire without reservations or guilt. Abyss is first seen at the end of novel volume 3, and of anime episode 12, with a speaking role, and again in cameo during the closing credits.
Another member of the Family is Kururi Nikaidou, a young female juvenile delinquent murderer possessing a knife wathe. She was picked up by Abyss and joined the family off-stage during volume 3 / anime episode 12. She is first seen in volume 4 chapter 2 part 3 & in cameo in anime episode 12.
Sunao Himura (日村 素直, Himura Sunao)
Voiced by: Shinichiro Miki
Math teacher at the school and homeroom teacher of Shiraho's class 7. Also a member of the Laboratory Emirate and Kirika Ueno's partner. He often uses his superior position to torment Ueno by constantly goading and flirting with her, much to her disgust. Most confrontations between the two usually lead to Ueno hitting him or nearly choking him to death with her River of Black Strings. It's later revealed that he is literally obsessed with Kirika and had gained her trust and respect before snapping and doing something terrible to betray that trust and respect. His original mission was to observe and record Haruaki's attempts to dispel the curses on Wathe, and the actions of Haruaki and Konoha in school. He installed a multitude of surveillance devices in Haruaki's and Shiraho's homes. Kirika insists that he disable the ones in Shiraho's home.
Himura possesses a Wathe called "He in the Bastille" (named after the first person to use it), which is a large helmet that can render the user and one other person imperceptible. Whether it is sight, sound, smell, touch or taste when activated the user isn't detected. However, its curse causes the user to become more and more imperceptible after each use even when not wearing the Wathe. Their presence or acknowledgement of their existence fades away from everybody's, including the user's, perception. So extensive use would cause the user to forget their own existence. In the Light novels it's noted by all the students that he has very little presence at all. As time passes he tries to make Kirika his in various ways such as blackmail and trying to get Haruaki killed without revealing any connections to the deed.
Himura and Ueno work for Kirika Ueno's older brother, who has vainly renamed himself Yamimagari Pakuaki and runs a institute that researches cursed tools. Yamimagari Pakuaki and his assistant Un Izoey are first seen in volume 5 of the novel and in cameo in the closing scenes of anime episode 12. Yamimagari Pakuaki is well aware of Himura exceeding his authority, and in volume 5 changes assignments and reduces Himura's authority. He says that he will assign another worker, partly to replace Kirika and partly to watch Himura. At the end of volume 8 this is revealed to be Un Izoey, who is enrolled as a student in the school. It is not explicitly stated but implied that she will be in the same class as Haruaki, Fear and Kirika.

== Reception ==
The characters from C^{3} have received various reviews. In a first impression review, Chris Walden from Japanator stated that he thought that Haruaki has the personality of a "wet flannel". In conclusion though he stated that with the exception of Haruaki and Konoha, the characters were pretty "well fleshed out and interesting". Walden cited a lack of explanation of Konoha's cursed past, and Haruaki's boringness as issues, but praised Kirika's character for being well explained. Andy Hanley from UK Anime gave a different take saying that the characters dip in, and out of plot advancement as the story suits without giving the viewer a chance to care about them too much. In a review of episode five from the anime, Josh Tolentino from Japanator said it was strange that Kirika could obtain a personality in less than ten minutes while the series still had two "bland" main characters.
