= Mioko Yamaguchi =

Japanese singer-songwriter and pop composer

Mioko Yamaguchi (Japanese: 山口美央子) is a Japanese singer-songwriter and composer of popular music.

Yamaguchi's music career began on F-Label, where she released a trilogy of albums where she sang and played keyboards. She also composed most of her own songs. After the album Tsukihime (Japanese: 月姫; Moonlight Princess) in 1983, she changed her focus to providing music to others. Yamaguchi has composed songs for artists such as Yuki Saito and Yukari Tamura. In addition, she has composed music for anime, including Ranma 1/2 and Pokonyan!. She has composed over 400 songs overall.

After over 30 years, Yamaguchi began releasing new music herself, beginning with Tokisakashima (Japanese: トキサカシマ) in late 2018. She also reissued her original albums on CD for the first time.

== Discography ==
Studio albums

- 夢飛行 (1980)
- Nirvana (1981)
- 月姫 (1983)
- トキサカシマ (2018)
- Floma (2019)
- フェアリズム (2022)
- LOVE & SALT (2025)

Compilation

- Anju (1985)

EP

- Floma Mini (2020)

Singles

- Koi Wa Shunkan (Japanese: 恋は春感) (1983) Oricon number 22
