= What's New, Pussycat? (album) =

WHAT'S NEW PUSSYCAT?

Studio album by Yukari Tamura
- Released: September 26, 1997
- Genre: J-pop
- Length: 30:20
- Label: PolyGram Japan
- Producer: Hiroki Horio

Yukari Tamura chronology
WHAT'S NEW PUSSYCAT? (1997)	Tenshi wa Hitomi no Naka ni (2001)

What's New, Pussycat? is Yukari Tamura's first mini album, released on September 26, 1997, as her debut. The album is no longer being printed and is highly sought after by Yukari Tamura's fans.

== Track listing ==
1. Happy Birthday
  - Lyrics: Kakeru Saegusa
  - Arrangement and composition: Kazuhisa Yamaguchi
2. 輝きの季節 (Kagayaki no Kisetsu)
  - Lyrics: Kakeru Saegusa
  - Arrangement and composition: Kazuhisa Yamaguchi
3. Love me do
  - Lyrics: Kakeru Saegusa
  - Arrangement and composition: Kazuhisa Yamaguchi
4. スーパーヘルパー (SUUPAA HERUPAA)
  - Lyrics: Kakeru Saegusa
  - Arrangement and composition: Kazuhisa Yamaguchi
5. Sparkle with delight
  - Lyrics: Kakeru Saegusa
  - Arrangement and composition: Kazuhisa Yamaguchi
6. マーメイド (MAAMEIDO)
  - Lyrics: Kakeru Saegusa
  - Arrangement and composition: Kazuhisa Yamaguchi
