= Marhy =

marhy
- Origin: Japan
- Genres: Pop, rock, grime, anime
- Occupations: Singer, songwriter, composer, Arrangement, Chorus
- Instruments: Vocals, keyboards
- Years active: 2004–present
- Website: http://www.ravenjam.com/inner/details_marhy.html

marhy (marhy), is a Japanese artist, singer-songwriter, and arranger based in Japan.

== Biography ==
marhy showed a talent for song and dance from the age of 2. At 4 years of age, she began to take keyboard lessons. By the age of 12, she had composed and won several awards such as a composer award for electric keyboard. In October 2004, together with her sister, Sora Izumikawa, marhy established a group called "DAUGHTER" and released an album of the same name. In August 2006 and February 2007, marhy as a solo artist, released two singles "Clover" and "CROSS ROAD" (TV Tokyo animation "Otogi-Jūshi Akazukin" Ending theme). She is not only a well known Japanese singer, but also provides musical support to other artists.

== Discography ==
Vocals and chorus （as marhy）

- PoPoLoCrois (Poporokuroisu Monogatari) – Bouken no Hajimari Theme Song "Hitomi no Tobira" / Vocal
- Licca-chan Voice Over Vocal
- Jamzvillage Live Chorus
- sugizo Compilation Chorus
- Sona "waltz", "Ameni Utaeba" / Chorus, Live Chorus
- Boku no Natsuyasumi 3（PlayStation 3） Theme Song "Himawari Musume " Vocal
- "Bohemian Jazz Cooking" Queen JAZZ coverage / Album Vocalist

Singer & Songwriting – DAUGHTER –

- sora & marhy = DAUGHTER feat. the fascinations album Rock meets Jazz "aMERICAN SWING "

== Works for others ==
Songwriting – Artists –

- Sowelu "Shine "Mizuho Bank lottery, Jingle Writer / Composition
- Sona "Shigatsu ", "COCOA " / Composition
- Masaki Toriyama "Utakatano Koibito", "Dorobou Neko " / Composition
- Takako Matsu "Welcome Back" / Composition
- YeLLOW Generation "Utakata" TBS Drama "Hot Man" Sub theme song / Composition
- Miwako Okuda "love you" TV Tokyo "Ikinari Kekkon Seikatsu" Ending theme / Composition, Lyrics（Collaboration）, "Tsukiga Suki ", "Ameno Oto ", "Habataite Toriwa Kieru" / Composition
- Yukari Tamura "Tsubomino Mamade", "Kokorono Tobira", "Nijino Kiseki" /Lyrics, Composition, Arrangement, "Primary Tale", "Eternity " /Lyrics, Composition, Arrangement, "Tsukino Melody" /Lyrics, "Oikaze ", "Sweetest Love", "Air Shooter" /Lyrics, Composition, "Jellyfish" / Composition, "YOURS EVER" /Lyrics, Composition, Arrangement
- Ex.Bold "Story" / Composition, Chorus
- Yui Ichikawa "Fu Fu Fu Boyfriend" / Composition, Chorus
- 0930 "VIVA Seishun" /Lyrics, Composition, Arrangement
- Mika Goto "Sunadokei" /Lyrics, Composition, Arrangement, "tokage", "Endeavor " / Composition
- Sora "Niji wo Wataru Kaze no Youni" / Composition
- Atsuko Enomoto "GoodLuck GoodDay " Composition
- Kaori Kawamura "Butterfly " Composition/Lyrics（Collaboration）
- Sora Izumikawa "Lights" Composition, in the album "11" (juuichi)

Songwriting – Anime –

- Steel Angel Kurumi( Kōtetsu Tenshi Kurumi) (Anime) Theme Song "Egao Kudasai" / Composition, Chorus, Chorus arrangement
- Best Student Council (Gokujō Seitokai) (Anime) Compilation "Only Place", "my friend" /Lyrics, Composition, Arrangement
- Kamisama Kazoku (Anime) OP "Brand New Morning Come" /Arrangement
- Kamisama Kazoku (Anime) Ending theme "Toshokandewa Oshietekurenai Tenshibo Himitsu" / Composition, Arrangement
- Otogi-Jūshi Akazukin (Anime) Compilation "Sympathy" Composition, Arrangement
- Yes! PreCure 5 Ending theme "Kirakira Shichatte My True Love! " Composition, Collaboration Arrangement
- Fresh Pretty Cure! (Anime) Ending theme "You make me happy! " Composition
- Kōtetsu Sangokushi (Anime) Compilation "Koubou" Composition, Arrangement
- HeartCatch PreCure! (Anime) Ending theme "Heart Catch Paradise" Composition
