= Yukari Tamura =

Japanese voice actress and singer

- 田村 ゆかり
- Born: February 27, 1976 (age 50); Fukuoka Prefecture, Japan
- Occupations: Voice actress; singer
- Years active: 1997–present
- Agent: Amuleto
- Height: 157 cm (5 ft 2 in)
- Musical career
- Genre: J-pop
- Instrument: Vocals
- Years active: 2001–present
- Labels: PolyGram Japan (1997–2001); Konami (2001–2007); King (2007–2016); Cana aria/Teichiku (2017–present)
- Website: www.tamurayukari.com

Yukari Tamura (田村 ゆかり, Tamura Yukari; born February 27, 1976) is a Japanese voice actress and singer affiliated with Amuleto. She released her debut single "Yūki o Kudasai" on March 26, 1997. She is best known for her roles as Nanoha Takamachi in Magical Girl Lyrical Nanoha series and Ruru Amour / Cure Amour in Hugtto! PreCure.

== Biography ==
Born in Fukuoka Prefecture, Tamura gained fame as an advocate for the Lolita fashion movement, wearing Lolita-style clothing in public, and for her music releases, often in music videos and for album cover on CD releases. Affectionately called Yukarin by her fans, several of her releases have been used as opening and ending themes for anime series, while some have reached the Oricon top 100 singles and album charts. In 2001, Tamura and Yui Horie formed a unit called Yamato Nadeshiko. Two singles were released, Mō Hitori no Watashi and Merry Merrily - the latter of which was an insert song in the Love Hina Christmas Special.

On January 1, 2007, Tamura left Arts Vision and joined I'm Enterprise. On April 1, 2007, her record company officially changed from Konami to King Records. However, there was no material effect for her, because the actual record production of Konami is carried out by King Records. She is the narrator of anime satellite television network Animax.

In February 2016, her agency announced that a concert which had been announced during a Niconico livestream was cancelled in 2015. Her management also announced that her fan club would change ownership and her radio programs would end. Her staff's Twitter account would be closed and her website would undergo maintenance. On February 13, 2016, her management announced that her contract with King Records would end on March 20. She left I'm Enterprise and currently works at Amuleto.

== Filmography ==
=== Anime ===
List of voice performances in anime
Year	Title	Role	Notes	Source
	Crayon Shin-chan	Various characters		
1997	Tenchi in Tokyo	Yoshinaga		
1997	Battle Athletes	Young Ayla, others	Also Victory	
1998	Trigun	Helen	Ep. 9	
1998	Sentimental Journey	Micah		
1998	Case Closed	Mina Aoshima	Ep. 121	
1999	Angel Links	Yayoi, others		
1999	Orphen: The Revenge	Waitress	Ep. 11	
1999	Dai-Guard	Fuuka Tanigawa		
1999–2000	The Big O	Girl, Forensics		
1999	Seraphim Call	Miki	Ep. 7	
2000	Boogiepop Phantom	Kyoko Kinoshita		
2000	Mon Colle Knights	Elf		
2000	The King of Braves GaoGaiGar Final	Anryu, Kouryu, Tenryujin	OVA, Also Grand Glorious Gathering in 2005	
2000	Super Milk Chan	Hirosue		
2000	Miami Guns	Lu Amano		
2000	Platinumhugen Ordian	Mei Li		
2000	Brigadoon: Marin & Melan	Companion		
2000	Hajime no Ippo	Aikawa		
2000	Shin Megami Tensei: Devil Children	Nekomata		
2000	Invincible King Tri-Zenon	Kurama Kyou, Riku Munakata		
2000	Dotto Koni-chan	Moro		
2000	Labyrinth of Flames	Kasumi		
2001	Prétear	Yayoi Takato		
2001	The SoulTaker	Asuka Sakurai		
2001	Zaion: I Wish You Were Here	Ai		
2001	s-CRY-ed	Kanami Yuta		
2002	Full Metal Panic!	AI (Kurtz machine)		
2002	Please Teacher!	Ichigo Morino		
2002	Kanon	Mai Kawasumi		
2002–06	Galaxy Angel series	Ranpha Franboise		
2002	Pita Ten	Misha		
2002	Jing: King of Bandits	Rose		
2002	G-On Riders	Zero		
2002–07	Naruto	Tenten		
2002–04	Nurse Witch Komugi	Asuka Sakurai	OVA	
2003	Interlude	Maiko Tamaki	OVA	
2003–08	Da Capo series	Sakura Yoshino	Also Second Season, II and II: Second Season	
2003	Please Twins!	Ichigo Morino		
2003–04	Godannar series	Ellis Valentine		
2003	R.O.D the TV	Haruhi Nishizono, Natsume Nishizono		
2004	Midori Days	Shiori Tsukishima		
2004	Melody of Oblivion	Koko Ninna-Nanna		
2004	Le Portrait de Petit Cossette	Kaori Nishimoto		
2004	DearS	Nia		
2004–07	Magical Girl Lyrical Nanoha series	Nanoha Takamachi	Also A's, Strikers	
2004	My-HiME	Midori Sugiura		
2004	Kujibiki Unbalance	Komaki Asagiri		
2004–05	Final Approach	Miki Moriya		
2004	Uta Kata	Michiru Munakata		
2005	Jinki: Extend	Rui Kousaka		
2005	Air	Michiru		
2005–06	Otogi-Jūshi Akazukin	Akazukin	OVA, TV series	
2005	Best Student Council	Rino Randō		
2005	Trinity Blood	Wendy		
2005	Full Metal Panic!: The Second Raid	Kurtz's AI		
2005–07	Shakugan no Shana	Tiriel		
2005	My-Otome	Midori Sugiura		
2005	SoltyRei	Celica Yayoi		
2005	Itsudatte My Santa!	MaiMai	OVA	
2006	Kashimashi: Girl Meets Girl	Tomari Kurusu, Mari		
2006	Gintama	Saki Hanano		
2006	Ouran High School Host Club	Éclair Tonnerre		
2006–21	Higurashi When They Cry series	Rika Furude	Also Kai, Rei, others	
2006	Tokimeki Memorial Only Love	Yukari Higashino		
2006	Kanon	Mai Kawasumi	2006 remake	
2007–17	Naruto: Shippuden	Tenten		
2007	Heroic Age	Tail Ol Nahilm		
2007	Idolmaster: Xenoglossia	Iori Minase		
2007	Sugar Bunnies series	Momousa and Hanausa, Charlotte	Also Chocolat, Fleur	
2007	Mushi-Uta	Azusa Horizaki, Minmin		
2007	Moetan	Ink Nijihara, Pastel Ink		
2007	My-Otome Zwei	Midori Sugiura	OVA	
2007	Sketchbook: full color'S	Nagisa Kurihara		
2007	Myself; Yourself	Shuri Wakatsuki		
2007–09	Clannad series	Mei Sunohara	Also After Story	
2008	Nabari no Ou	Shinraban-sho		
2008	Monochrome Factor	Lulu		
2008–15	Kaitō Tenshi Twin Angel	Haruka Minazuki / Red Angel	OVA and Twinkle Paradise	
2008–10	Black Butler series	Elizabeth Midford	Also II	
2009	The Girl Who Leapt Through Space	Kazane Shishido		
2009	Samurai Harem: Asu no Yoichi	Chihaya Ikaruga		
2009	Kurokami: The Animation	Excel		
2009	Hayate the Combat Butler!!	Maya		
2009–10	Gokujō!! Mecha Mote Iinchō	Momozato Marin		
2009	Umineko When They Cry	Bernkastel		
2009	Kämpfer	Black Seppuku Rabbit		
2009	A Certain Scientific Railgun	Miho Jufuku		
2009	The Book of Bantorra	Ireia = Kitty (adolescence)		
2010	The Qwaser of Stigmata	Eva-R		
2010	Katanagatari	Togame		
2010	B Gata H Kei	Yamada		
2010	Mayoi Neko Overrun!	Kaho Chikumaen		
2010	Stitch!	Twin		
2010–13	Oreimo series	Kanako Kurusu, Kirara Hoshino, Meruru		
2010–13	Tantei Opera Milky Holmes series	Saku Tōyama		
2011–13	Infinite Stratos series	Tabane Shinonono		
2011	Marvel Anime: X-Men	Armor/Hisako Ichiki		
2011	Steins;Gate	Suzuha Amane		
2011	Sket Dance	Fu-Fu- Fuka-chan		
2011	Lotte no Omocha!	Asuha Tōhara	Also EX	
2011	C3	Fear Kubrick		
2011	Sekai-ichi Hatsukoi 2	An Kohinata		
2011	Ben-To	Kyou Sawagi		
2011	A Bridge to the Starry Skies	Yūka Dan	OVA special	
2012	Waiting in the Summer	Remon Yamano		
2012	Rock Lee & His Ninja Pals	Tenten		
2012	Shirokuma Cafe	Penguin waitress		
2012–13	AKB0048 series	Mayu Watanabe Type 3	Also Next Stage	
2012	Horizon in the Middle of Nowhere: Season 2	Elizabeth		
2012	Busou Shinki	Yda		
2013	Oreshura	Masuzu Natsukawa		
2013	Muromi-san series	Muromi-san		
2013	Aiura	Misuzu Wakatsuki		
2013	The "Hentai" Prince and the Stony Cat	Tsukushi Tsutsukakushi		
2013	Donyatsu ja:どーにゃつ	Donyatsu		
2013–15	Kin-iro Mosaic	Isami Omiya		
2013	Kill la Kill	Nui Harime		
2013	Yowamushi Pedal	Kotori Himeno		
2013	Samurai Flamenco	Sakura Momoi		
2014	Robot Girls Z	Emperor of Darkness		
2014	Saki: The Nationals	Hayari Mizuhara		
2014–15	Wooser's Hand-to-Mouth Life	Announcement Wooser		
2014	No-Rin	Ringo Kinoshita		
2014	If Her Flag Breaks	Mimori Seiteikōji		
2014	Dai-Shogun - Great Revolution	Chiharu		
2014	No Game No Life	Jibril	Ep. 5 - 12	
2014	Akame ga Kill!	Mine		
2014	Kuroshitsuji: Book of Circus	Elizabeth Midford		
2014–15	I Can't Understand What My Husband Is Saying	Kaoru Tsunashi		
2014	Cross Ange	Hilda		
2014	Gugure! Kokkuri-san	Narrator		
2014	Gonna be the Twin-Tail!!	Mega Neptune Mk. II		
2014	Shirobako	Rina Souma		
2014	Girl Friend Beta	Koruri Tokitani		
2015	Absolute Duo	Rito Tsukimi		
2015	Magical Girl Lyrical Nanoha ViVid	Nanoha Takamachi		
2015	Takamiya Nasuno Desu!	Ayano Takamiya		
2015	Seiyu's Life!	Herself		
2016	Muv-Luv: Schwarzesmarken	Beatrix Brehme		
2016	The Asterisk War	Violet Weinberg	Second Season	
2016	Haven't You Heard? I'm Sakamoto	Kana		
2016	Shōnen Maid	Chiyo Komiya		
2016	Re:Zero	Priscilla Barielle		
2016	Ange Vierge	Amane Ayashiro		
2016	The Disastrous Life of Saiki K.	Chiyo Yumehara		
2016	Active Raid	Emilia Edelman		
2016	Magic-kyun! Renaissance	Sakura Aigasaki		
2017–19	Granblue Fantasy The Animation	Io Euclase	Ep. 6	
2017	Knight's & Magic	Eleonora Kuschpercha		
2017	Restaurant to Another World	Victoria Samanark	Ep. 5	
2018	Island	Rinne Ohara		
2018–19	Hugtto! PreCure	Ruru Amour / Cure Amour		
2018	Cutie Honey Universe	Misty Honey		
2018	The Disastrous Life of Saiki K. 2	Chiyo Yumehara		
2018	Lost Song	Finis		
2018	Steins;Gate 0	Suzuha Amane; Yuki Amane		
2018	Crossing Time	Yukiko		
2018	Last Period	Choco, Rika Furude (ep 3)		
2019	Revisions	Mukyū Isurugi		
2019	Oresuki	Keiki "Laurier" Kisaragi		
2019	Girls' Frontline: Healing Chapter	M4 SOPMOD II, M4 SOPMOD II Jr.		
2019	Granbelm	Shisui Tsuchimikado		
2020	Super HxEros	Keikaichuu		
2020	Iwa-Kakeru! -Sport Climbing Girls-	Anne Kurusu		
2021	Cute Executive Officer	Najimu's Mother		
2021	Seven Knights Revolution: Hero Successor	Vanessa		
2021	Dragon Quest: The Adventure of Dai	Albinass		
2021	I've Been Killing Slimes for 300 Years and Maxed Out My Level	Pecora / Provat Pecora Allières	Ep. 6 - 7, 11 - 12	
2021	I'm Standing on a Million Lives	Iris		
2021	The World's Finest Assassin Gets Reincarnated in Another World as an Aristocrat	Goddess		
2021–22	Kaginado	Mai Kawasumi		
2022	Girls' Frontline	M4 SOPMOD II:		
2022	Miss Kuroitsu from the Monster Development Department	Reo Shikishima / Magia Rose		
2022	Birdie Wing: Golf Girls' Story	Mizuho Himekawa		
2022	Love After World Domination	Ultimate Phantom	Ep. 12	
2022	I've Somehow Gotten Stronger When I Improved My Farm-Related Skills	Ilvia		
2023	The Dangers in My Heart	Kana Ichikawa		
2023	Yuri Is My Job!	Mai Mikoshiba		
2023	Dark Gathering	Anna Misaki	Ep. 14 - 16	
2024	Chillin' in Another World with Level 2 Super Cheat Powers	Uliminas		
2024	Suicide Squad Isekai	Lich	Ep. 9 and 10	
2024	Highspeed Etoile	Ami		
2024	The Healer Who Was Banished From His Party, Is, in Fact, the Strongest	Raruma		
2026	The Strongest Job Is Apparently Not a Hero or a Sage, but an Appraiser (Provisional)!	Sapo-chan		
2026	Magical Girl Lyrical Nanoha Exceeds Gun Blaze Vengeance	Nanoha Takamachi		
2026	The Forsaken Saintess and Her Foodie Roadtrip in Another World	Sheila		
2026	A Tale of the Secret Saint	Clarissa Abanecy		
2026	So What's Wrong with Getting Reborn as a Goblin?	Creation of Heaven and Earth		

=== Film ===
List of voice performances in film
Year	Title	Role	Notes	Source
1998	The Doraemons: The Great Operating of Springing Insects	Yagorobo		
1999	Crayon Shin-chan: Explosion! The Hot Spring's Feel Good Final Battle	Ibusuki		
2009	Naruto Shippuden the Movie: The Will of Fire	Tenten		
2010	Magical Girl Lyrical Nanoha The Movie 1st	Nanoha Takamachi		
2012	Road to Ninja: Naruto the Movie	Tenten		
2012	Magical Girl Lyrical Nanoha The Movie 2nd A's	Nanoha Takamachi		
2013	Steins;Gate: Fuka Ryōiki no Déjà vu	Suzuha Amane		
2016	Tantei Opera Milky Holmes the Movie: Milky Holmes' Counterattack	Saku Toyama		
2017	Crayon Shin-chan: Invasion!! Alien Shiriri	Ibusuki		
2017	Black Butler: Book of the Atlantic	Elizabeth Midford		
2017	No Game, No Life Zero	Jibril		
2017	Magical Girl Lyrical Nanoha Reflection	Nanoha Takamachi, Stern of Annihilation		
2018	Magical Girl Lyrical Nanoha Detonation	Nanoha Takamachi, Stern of Annihilation		
2018	Hugtto! PreCure Futari wa Pretty Cure: All Stars Memories	Ruru Amour/Cure Amour		
2024	Mobile Suit Gundam SEED Freedom	Aura Maha Khyber		
2024	Pui Pui Molcar The Movie MOLMAX	Great Magic Angel Morumi		
2026	Shiboyugi: Playing Death Games to Put Food on the Table – 44: Cloudy Beach	Koyomi		
2027	The Eminence in Shadow: Lost Echoes	Yūka Asakura		

=== Drama CD ===
List of voice performances in drama CDs and other recordings
Title	Role	Notes	Source
The Ambition of Oda Nobuna	Motoyasu Matsudaira		
Aquarian Age	Nozomu Yuki		
Clannad	Mei Sunohara		
Da Capo	Sakura Yoshino		
Final Approach			
The Garden of Sinners: Overlooking View	Azaka Kokuto		
The Girl Who Leapt Through Space	Kazane Shishidou		
G-On Riders	Zero		
Hanbun no Tsuki ga Noboru Sora	Rika Akiba		
Higurashi When They Cry series	Rika Furude		
Idolmaster Xenoglossia	Iori Minase		
Is This a Zombie?	Eucliwood Hellscythe		
Judgement Chime	Freyjalt Fall		
Little Princess: Marl Ōkoku no Ningyō Hime 2	Myao Karukansky		
Macross Generation	Passel	Debut	
Metal Slader Glory	Azusa Hinata		
Nagasarete Airantou	Ayane		
No-Rin	Ringo Kinoshita		
Oreimo	Kanako Kurusu, Meruru		
Shining Force EXA	Fawkrin		

=== Video games ===
List of voice performances in video games
Year	Title	Role	Notes	Source
1997	Armored Core	Computer voice Standard, Murakumo Millennium	PS1/PS2	
1997	Armored Core: Project Phantasma	Head computer voice Standard, Murakumo Millennium	PS1/PS2	
1998	Battle Athletes Alternative	Arashiko	PS1/PS2	
1998	Cooking Fighter Hao	Cumin-Shami	PS1/PS2	
1998	Eberouge Specials	Euross Prombanth	PS1/PS2	
1998–2004	Tokyo Majin series	Kyoko Tono	PS1/PS2	
1998	Rhapsody: A Musical Adventure	Myao	PS1/PS2	
1999	True Love Story 2	Kunshi	PS1/PS2	
1999	Armored Core: Master of Arena	Head computer voice "Standard", Murakumo Millennium	PS1/PS2	
1999–2005	Memories Off series	Kaoru Otoha	PS1/PS2	
1999	Little Princess: Marl Ōkoku no Ningyō Hime 2	Myao, Nyancy, Nyanko	PS1/PS2	
1999–2003	Tokimeki Memorial 2 games	Mei Ijuuin	PS1/PS2	
2000	Summon Night	Replenishing	PS1/PS2	
2000	Kanon games	Mai Kawasumi		
2000	Tenshi no Present: Marl Ōkoku Monogatari	Myao	PS1/PS2	
2001	Invincible King Tri-Zenon	Munakata Nashibeni	PS1/PS2	
2001	Summon Night 2	Replenishing	PS1/PS2	
2002	Grandia Xtreme	Myam	PS1/PS2	
2002	La Pucelle: Tactics	Chocolat Corps	PS1/PS2, Also Ragnarok in 2009	
2002	Soulcalibur II	Talim	Arcade/PS2/GC/Xbox	
2002	Air	Michiru	PS1/PS2	
2002	Moeyo Ken	KanoRinKaoru	PS1/PS2	
2002	Nobunaga's Ambition Online	Female character		
2002–07	Galaxy Angel games	Ranpha Franboise		
2003–14	Quiz Magic Academy series	Clara, Amelia		
2003	Snow	Asahi Hiyorigawa	DC	
2003–13	Naruto video games	Tenten		
2003–05	Da Capo video games	Sakura Yoshino	PS1/PS2	
2004	Phantom Brave	Myao	PS2	
2004	Castle Shikigami 2	Arala Cran	PS1/PS2	
2004	Snow	Weather River Asahi	PS1/PS2	
2004	Interlude	Maiko Tamaki		
2004	DearS	Nia	PS1/PS2	
2004	Berserk Millennium Falcon Arc: Chapter of the Holy Demon War	Evarella	PS1/PS2	
2004	Final Approach 2	Miki Moriya	Also Fandisc	
2004–06	Zoids Infinity video games	Canon		
2005	Nana	Misato Uehara	PS1/PS2	
2005	Best Student Council	Rino Randŏ	PS1/PS2	
2005	Soulcalibur III	Talim	PS2	
2005–07	Lucky Star Moe Drill games	Hikage Miyakawa	Also Journey	
2006	Clannad	Mei Sunohara	PS1/PS2	
2006	Disgaea 2: Cursed Memories	Rozalin	PS1/PS2	
2006	My-HiME games	Midori Sugiura	PSP	
2006	Shakugan no Shana games	Tiriel	PS1/PS2	
2006–11	Kaitō Tenshi Twin Angel games	Haruka Minazuki / Red Angel	pachinko games and others	
2006	Summon Night 4	Volume	PS1/PS2	
2007	Shining Force EXA	Faulklin	PS1/PS2	
2007	Kanon	Mai Kawasumi	PSP	
2007–15	Higurashi When They Cry video games	Rika Furude, Ōka Furude		
2007	Fate/stay night Realta Nua	Luviagelita Edelfeld	PS1/PS2	
2007	Snow -Portable-	Weather River Asahi	PSP	
2007–09	Myself; Yourself games	Shuri Wakatsuki	PS1/PS2	
2007	Star Ocean: First Departure	Perisie	PSP	
2007	Nitro+ Royale -Heroines Duel	Con Ruili	PC	
2008	Disgaea 3	Rozalin	PS3	
2008	CR Sengoku Otome	Oda Nobunaga	Pachinko game, Also 2 in 2011	
2008	Moetan DS	NijiHara ink (pastel ink)	DS	
2008	Soulcalibur IV	Talim	PS3; Also Broken Destiny	
2009	Growlanser	Melia	PSP	
2009–11	Steins;Gate games	Suzuha Amane, Yuki Amane (Steins;Gate 0)		
2010–11	Magical Girl Lyrical Nanoha video games	Nanoha Takamachi, Stern of Annihilation		
2010	Spy Girl	Rabyi	Other	
2010	Tales of Phantasia: Narikiri Dungeon X	Etos	PSP	
2010	Shining Hearts	Misty	PSP	
2010–12	Tantei Opera Milky Holmes games	Saku Toyama	PSP	
2011	Guns Girl: School Day Z	Theresa Apocalypse	Mobile	
2011	Tsukumonogatari	Tamaki Kurashina	PSP	
2011–12	Oreimo games	Kanako Kurusu	PSP	
2011–15	Gal*Gun games	Patako		
2011	Rune Factory Oceans	Pandora		
2011	Queen's Gate Spiral Chaos	NijiHara ink	PSP	
2011	Umineko no Naku Koro ni games	Bernkastel	PS3	
2012	Shining Blade	Misty	PSP	
2012–13	Mugen Souls games	Chou Chou	Also Z	
2012	Project X Zone	Mii Kouryuuji	3DS	
2013–14	Demon Gaze games	Roux-Runaku	Other	
2013	Horizon on the Middle of Nowhere Portable	Elizabeth	PSP	
2013	Phantom Breaker: Extra	Mei Orisaka		
2013	The Legend of Heroes: Trails of Cold Steel	Vita Clotilde/Misty	PS3/PS Vita	
2014	Super Heroine Chronicle	Haruka Minazuki / Red Angel, Rika Furude		
2014	Granblue Fantasy	Io, Mewmew	Browser Game, Android, iOS	
2014	The Legend of Heroes: Trails of Cold Steel II	Vita Clotilde	PS3/PS Vita	
2015	Stella Glow	Hilda	3DS	
2015	Return to PoPoLoCRoIS: A STORY OF SEASONS Fairytale	Iris	3DS	
2015	IS <Infinite Stratos> 2 Love and purge	Shinononotaba		
2015	Project X Zone 2: Brave New World	June Lin Milliam	3DS	
2015	Girl Friend Beta	Koruri Tokitani	Other	
2015	Muv-Luv: Schwarzesmarken	Beatrix Brehme		
2015	Nitroplus Blasterz: Heroines Infinite Duel	Ruili		
2015	Steins;Gate 0	Suzuha Amane, Yuki Amane	Other	
2015	Miracle Girls Festival	Kinoshita apple (Yuka Kusakabe)	Other	
2016	Girls' Frontline	M4 SOPMOD II	Mobile	
2016	Summon Night 6: Lost Borders	Volume	Other	
2016	Honkai Impact 3rd	Theresa Apocalypse	Mobile	
2017	Dissidia Final Fantasy Opera Omnia	Krile Mayer Baldesion	Other	
2017	The Legend of Heroes: Trails of Cold Steel III	Vita Clotilde	PS4	
2018	Fire Emblem Heroes	Laegjarn	Android, IOS	
2018	The Legend of Heroes: Trails of Cold Steel IV	Vita Clotilde	PS4	
2018	Soulcalibur VI	Talim	PC/PS4/Xbox One	
2018	Mega Man 11	Bounce Man	PC/PS4/Xbox One/Switch	
2018	Dragalia Lost	Amane	Mobile Game	
2018	Sword Art Online: Memory Defrag	Thokk	Android, IOS	
2019	Another Eden	Premaya	Mobile/Switch	
2019	Touhou Cannonball	Remilia Scarlet	Mobile/Switch	
2019	Epic Seven	Angelica	Mobile Game	
2020	Genshin Impact	Qiqi	Android/iOs/PC/PS4/Switch	
2020	The Legend of Heroes: Trails into Reverie	Vita Clotilde	PS4	
2020	Kamen Rider: Memory of Heroez	Ai/Aida/Muchiri	PS4/Switch	
2020	Fate/Grand Order	Himiko	Mobile Game	
2021	Pokémon Masters	Marnie	Mobile Game	
2021	Blue Archive	Yakushi Saya	Mobile Game	
2022	Genshin Impact	Nahida / Lesser Lord Kusanali / Buer	Android/iOs/PC/PS4/Switch	
2022	Anonymous;Code	Juno Saionji (JUNO)	PS4/Switch/PC	
2022	Dragon Quest Treasures	Shambles, Monsters	Switch	
2023	Guardian Tales	Clara	Android/iOs	
2023	Master Detective Archives: Rain Code	Melami Goldmine	Switch	
2023	Goddess of Victory: Nikke	Liliweiss	Android/iOs/PC	
2023	Arknights	Muelsyse	Android/iOs	
2024	Riichi City	Yuzo	Android/iOs/PC	
2024	Lollipop Chainsaw RePOP	Juliet Starling	PC/PS5/Switch/Xbox Series	
2025	Punishing: Gray Raven	Discord	Android/iOS/PC	
2026	Dissidia Duellum Final Fantasy	Krile Mayer Baldesion	Mobile	

=== Tokusatsu ===
List of voice performances in tokusatsu
Year	Title	Role	Notes	Source
2011–12	Kaizoku Sentai Gokaiger	Navi	Also in: 199 Hero Great Battle; The Flying Ghost Ship; Gokaiger vs. Gavan; Go-Busters vs. Gokaiger	
2016	Doubutsu Sentai Zyuohger	Navi	Episodes 28 and 29; Role reprisal from Gokaiger	

=== Dubbing roles ===
List of voice performances in dubbing
Title	Role	Source
Piranha 3D	Zane Forester (Sage Ryan)	
Spin City	Karen Palmieri (Taylor Stanley)	
Yellowjackets	Misty (Christina Ricci)	

== Discography ==
=== Studio albums ===
- 1997: What's New, Pussycat?
- 2001: Tenshi wa Hitomi no Naka ni
- 2002: Hana-furi Tsukiyo to Koi-youbi.
- 2003: Aozora ni Yureru Mitsugetsu no Kobune.
- 2005: Kohaku no Uta, Hitohira
- 2006: Gin no Senritsu, Kioku no Mizuoto.
- 2008: Izayoi no Tsuki, Canaria no Koi.
- 2009: Komorebi no Rosette
- 2010: Citron no Ame
- 2011: Haru Machi Soleil
- 2013: Rasen no Kajitsu
- 2020: Candy tuft
- 2021: Ai Kotoba

=== Mini albums ===
- 2013: Hatsukoi (nominally by Yuka Kagurazaka)
- 2014: Doki Doki ☆ π Pine (nominally by Yuka Kagurazaka)
- 2015: Hito Natsu no Himitsu (nominally by Yuka Kagurazaka)
- 2017: Princess Limited

=== Compilation albums ===
- 2003: True Romance
- 2007: Sincerely Dears...
- 2012: Everlasting Gift
- 2015: Early Years Collection

=== DVDs ===
- 2002: Sweet chick girl
- 2004: Peachy Cherry Pie
- 2004: Yukari Tamura Summer Live 2004 - Sugar Time Trip
- 2006: Cutie Cutie Concert 2005 at Tokyo International Forum
- 2007: Yukari Tamura Live 2006-2007 Pinkle Twinkle☆Milky Way
- 2008: Love Live: Chelsea Girl

=== Blu-ray discs and DVDs ===
- 2009: LOVE ♡ LIVE *Dreamy Maple Crown*
- 2010: LOVE ♡ LIVE *Princess à la mode*
- 2011: LOVE ♡ LIVE *Mary Rose* & *Starry☆Candy☆Stripe*
- 2012: LOVE ♡ LIVE *I Love Rabbit*
- 2013: LOVE ♡ LIVE *Fall in Love*
- 2013: 17sai dayo?! Yukari-chan Matsuri!!
- 2014: LOVE ♡ LIVE *Cute'n ♡ Cute'n Heart*
- 2014: LOVE ♡ LIVE *Fruits Fruits ♡ Cherry* & *Caramel Ribbon*
- 2015: LOVE ♡ LIVE *Lantana in the Moonlight*

=== Singles ===
- 1997: "Yūki wo Kudasai"
- 1997: "We Can Fly" (duet with Yuria Hama)
- 1997: "Kagayaki no Kisetsu"
- 1998: "Rebirth: Megami Tensei"
- 1999: "Kitto Ieru"
- 2001: "Summer Melody"
- 2002: "Love Parade"
- 2002: "Baby's Breath"
- 2003: "Lovely Magic"
- 2003: "Nemurenu Yoru ni Tsukamaete"
- 2003: "My Life is Great"
- 2004: "Yumemizuki no Alice"
- 2004: "Sugar time trip"
- 2004: "Little Wish ~lyrical step~"
- 2005: "Koi seyo Onnanoko"
- 2005: "Picnic"
- 2005: "Spiritual Garden"
- 2006: "Dōwa Meikyū"
- 2006: "Princess Rose"
- 2007: "Hoshizora no Spica"
- 2007: "Mahō Shōjo Magical-tan" (魔法少女マジカルたん!)
- 2007: "Beautiful Amulet"
- 2008: "S·A·G·A ~Rinne no Hate ni~"
- 2008: "Mon chéri"
- 2008: "Bambino Bambina"
- 2008: "Tomorrow"
- 2009: "Metausa-hime: Kuro Yukari Ōkoku Misa"
- 2009: "You & Me"
- 2010: "My Wish My Love"
- 2010: "Oshiete A to Z"
- 2011: "Platinum Lover's Day"
- 2011: "Merōn Ondo: Festival of Kingdom"
- 2011: "Endless Story"
- 2012: "Hohoemi no Plumage"
- 2013: "W:Wonder Tale"
- 2013: "Fantastic Future"
- 2014: "Himitsu no door kara ai ni kite"
- 2014: "Anone Love me Do"
- 2015: "Sukidatte ienakute"
- 2018: "Koi wa Tenshi no Chime kara"
- 2018: "Eien no Hitotsu"
- 2018: "Tears Echo"
- 2020: "Catch you Cats Me"
- 2021: "Pink Pygmalion"
- 2021: "Que SeraSera"

== Concerts ==
=== Personal concerts ===
- 2003: *First Live -Aozora ni Yureru Mitsugetsu no Kobune.-*
- 2004: Summer Live☆2004 *Sugar Time Trip*
- 2004-2005: Countdown Event 2004-2005 *Chiisa na Onegai☆Chiisa na Ippo*
- 2005: Live Tour 2005 *Spring fever*
- 2005: *Cutie♡Cutie Concert* 2005
- 2006: Concert Tour 2006 *fancy baby doll*
- 2006: *Pinkle☆Twinkle Party* 2006 Winter
- 2007: 2007 Summer *Sweet Milky Way*
- 2008: LOVE ♡ LIVE 2008 *Chelsea Girl*
- 2009: LOVE ♡ LIVE 2009 *Dreamy Maple Crown*
- 2009-2010: LOVE ♡ LIVE 2009-2010 *Princess à la mode*
- 2010: LOVE ♡ LIVE 2010 *STARRY☆CANDY☆STRIPE*
- 2011: LOVE ♡ LIVE 2011 Spring *Mary Rose*
- 2012: LOVE ♡ LIVE 2012 *I Love Rabbit*
- 2012: LOVE ♡ LIVE 2012 Autumn *Fall in Love*
- 2013: LOVE ♡ LIVE 2013 *Cute'n ♡ Cute'n Heart*
- 2013: LOVE ♡ LIVE 2013 Autumn *Caramel Ribbon*
- 2014: LOVE ♡ LIVE 2014 Spring *Fruits Fruits ♡ Cherry*
- 2015: LOVE ♡ LIVE 2015 Winter *Lantana in the Moonlight*
- 2015: LOVE ♡ LIVE 2015 Spring *Sunny side Lily*
- 2017: 20th Anniversary LOVE ♡ LIVE 2017 *Crescendo ♡ Carol*

=== Other concerts ===
- Animelo Summer Live 2008
- Animelo Summer Live 2009
- Animelo Summer Live 2010
- Animelo Summer Live 2011
- Animelo Summer Live 2012
- Animelo Summer Live 2013
- Animelo Summer Live 2014
- King Super Live 2015
- Animelo Summer Live 2017
- King Super Live 2024

== Publications ==
- Sora Iro
  Released October 10, 2007
- Yukaringo
  Released February 23, 2011
- Yukarissimo
  Released September 20, 2012
- Yukari-Remix
  Released July 14, 2015
