= Otogi-Jūshi Akazukin =

Anime series

- Picture of Akazukin

おとぎ銃士 赤ずきん (Fairy Musketeers Little Red Riding Hood)
- Original video animation
- Directed by: Tetsurō Araki
- Written by: Shōji Yonemura
- Music by: Toshio Masuda
- Studio: Madhouse
- Released: February 20, 2005
- Episodes: 1
- Anime television series

Fairy Musketeers
- Directed by: Takaaki Ishiyama
- Written by: Yuuko Kakihara
- Music by: Toshio Masuda
- Studio: Madhouse (Note: Production assistance (制作協力) for all episodes provided by Group TAC.)
- Licensed by: US: Crunchyroll
- Original network: TV Tokyo
- Original run: July 1, 2006 – March 26, 2007
- Episodes: 39

Fairy Musketeers (おとぎ銃士 赤ずきん, Otogi-Jūshi Akazukin; lit. Fairy Musketeers Little Red Riding Hood) is a 2005 anime OVA as well as a 2006–2007 anime television series.

== Story ==
Long, long ago, there existed a world of magic and science. But having both powers was making people conceited and lazy. So God split the world in to the world of science, Erde (German for Earth), and the world of magic, Phandavale. One day in Phandavale, a terrible witch named Cendrillon revives. Cendrillon plots to rule both worlds, and searches for the "key of Erde" and the "key of Phandavale" which holds tremendous power.

A young boy from Erde by the name of Sōta meets a mysterious girl from Phandavale, Akazukin (Red Riding Hood), and her talking wolf companion, Val. Sōta learns that he is the key of Erde. Now it is up to Akazukin, Val, and the other Musketeers, Shirayukihime (Snow White) and Ibara (Sleeping Beauty) to protect Sōta from Cendrillon and her Nightmarians who wish to obtain the power he mysteriously possesses.

== Characters ==
Akazukin (赤ずきん; Little Red Riding Hood)
Voiced by: Yukari Tamura
The titular heroine from the magic world Phandavale (Magic). She is one of the Three Musketeers, and has come to the Erde world to protect Souta who holds the Erde Key. She uses magic, but her speciality seems to be physical attacks. She can control fire magic. Later on she gets an upgrade in her powers when the Three Musketeers try to obtain the ultimate magic. She was the one that received it, and when she activated it she called it Princess Mode, due to the fact it makes her look like a princess like the other two Musketeers. The power is like the other card magic she usually uses. The only thing is, it does not stay active all the time, only when used. She was born in Vise village, the same village where she met Val for the first time: the morning after the village was destroyed. Eleven years before the story, the village was destroyed by werewolves led by Jed. Jed attacked the village to kill his younger brother Cain, who is really Val. During the destruction, she lost her parents and Cain's mother. She has some feelings for Souta. Age: 14.
Sōta Suzukaze (鈴風草太, Suzukaze Sōta)
Voiced by: Motoko Kumai (OVA and TV 1-25), Yūko Sanpei (TV 26+)
The protagonist from the real world Erde (Science). He has a tendency to talk to flowers in the morning on his way to school, and after talking to them they mysteriously become more charming. He cares about the flowers a lot, and they help him out in return. Souta seems to have some power of his own: this was first discovered in an attempt to save Ringo from falling by Hansel's push (he unknowingly used an unknown flash and destroyed every opposing monster in the building). After he used it, he did not realize that he contained that power and thought it was Shiryuki's. He also reacted to a story card given to him by an elderly lady. So far he has collected 5 story cards of the Two World fairy tale stories (which tells the story of how Marlene turned into Cendrillon and the reason for her hatred). He is a kind and caring person, who can tell good people from bad. He is also smart and helps out in situations that the group befalls. His key power is activated whenever he feels strong emotion. He is the key of Erde, because his mother Soya was one of the sages who defeated Cendrillon 1000 years ago, and went to Erde afterwards to give birth to the child who would be safer in Erde then Phandavale. Age: 14.
Shirayukihime (白雪姫; Snow White)
Voiced by: Kanako Tateno
From the magic world Phandavale. She is also one of the Three Musketeers, and came to Souta to protect him. She uses intellectual magic, as she was top in her magic classes. Her specialty is magic attacks. She likes Souta and always hugs him or tries to get close to him, much to Ringo's dismay. She can control ice magic and water magic. She is a princess as her name suggests; however after her father remarried to a woman controlled by Cendrillon, the kingdom was taken away. Age: 14
Ringo Kinoshita (木ノ下りんご, Kinoshita Ringo)
Voiced by: Rie Kugimiya
Souta's childhood friend, who is very close to him. She wakes him up in the morning. She is the only one who understands Souta when he talks to flowers. She also worries about him a lot, and does not want to be away from him, like when Souta was going to go to Phandavale. She gets angry whenever Shirayuki clings on to Souta. She is a very good cook, especially with meat and potatoes. She has a crush on Souta. Age: 14.
Val (銀狼ヴァル, Ginrō Varu)
Voiced by: Nobuyuki Hiyama
Akazukin's companion who fights alongside her. He, like Akazukin, loves food from Erde, and even at serious moments would worry about food first. He seems to dislike Jed-same, a Lycan (werewolf). This was noticed when Souta was going to tell him that he saw a Lycan named Jed, and Val stopped him from saying it. He is Cain, Akazukin's childhood friend and Jed's younger brother, but ever since the night he was wounded by Jed, he lost the ability to transform into human form. Age: approximately 20.
Ibarahime (いばら姫; Sleeping Beauty)
Voiced by: Miyuki Sawashiro
From the magic world Phandavale. She is the 3rd of the Three Musketeers. She represents Sleeping Beauty, hence the reason she is usually half asleep. She uses a thorn whip to attack. Since her specialty is the Earth element, she can heal plants. It's discovered later that she is actually the princess of the Elf race, and was born with a magic talent, unlike those who have to learn it. She is always sleepy because she does not sleep at night; if she does her magic would go out of control and hurt people. Age: 14.
Cendrillon (サンドリヨン, San'doriyon; Cinderella)
Voiced by: Misa Watanabe
She is the evil witch that is trying to get Erde's key. Her real name is Marlene. In the beginning she was good, but ever since the boy she liked from Erde had to go back she started to hate the concept of two worlds. Her hatred grew when one day she found a way to get to Erde and saw through the mirror that the person she liked was now with another girl. This led her to aim for dark magic and get revenge on God. Her final transformation to Cenderillon happened when the boy she loved came back to stop her, got in the way of an attack and died. Age: unknown.
Randagio (ランダージョ, randājo)
Voiced by: Akiko Kobayashi
One of Cendrillon's minor servants, who is no threat to the main cast. He tries to capture Souta many times but always fails. He has three followers, and as a group they use musical magic. They are the Town Musicians of Bremen. He always carries a backpack with canned food with him. His aim is to be in Cendrillon's main army. Age: 100+.
Hansel (ヘンゼル, henzeru; Hansel)
Voiced by: Kaori Shimizu (OVA, TV (as a child)), Daisuke Hirakawa
He hates the weak, and even goes far as making his sister (who was hurt) feel bad. He was taught dark magic by Cendrillon, and the more he learned, the less he cared for his sister. Before he met Cendrillon, he was kind to his sister and others. It turns out he was controlled by Cendrillon and returned to normal (being the kind, loving brother) when Akazukin and co help save him. Age: 17.
Gretel (グレーテル, gurēteru; Gretel)/Erika (エリカ)
Voiced by: Sayuri Yahagi
She is Hansel's sister and cares for him. In the beginning she transferred into Souta's school and acted like a nice girl in front of him, but it was soon found out it was a trap to try to kidnap Souta. After losing the first fight against Akazukin and Shirayuki, she has tried to capture Souta many times in order to be acknowledged by her brother. It seems that when she and her brother were lost in the Forest of Okashi, they used to be on good terms, living in a house built of candy. All she really wants is to go back to being how they used to be, instead of fighting for Cendrillon. Even though she is an enemy, Souta always treats her nicely and even protects her, because he knows that she is a good person. Age: 13.
Hamelin (ハーメルン, Hamerun; The Pied Piper of Hamelin)
Voiced by: Kenji Nojima
He is a Leaf Knight who guarded the Phandavale Castle. He was given orders from the King to wait at the captured castle until Souta the key holder came, and tell him, "I believe in you"(meaning the King believes Souta will save the magic world). After he finished his mission, he went his own way to try to save the King on his own, for he prefers doing things alone. He specializes in musical magic. He hates pumpkins because of Akazukin, as she used to wear a pumpkin mask when she was little and scared him with it, and ever since he has been afraid of them. He seems to have feelings for Ringo. Age: 15.
King Fernando
Voiced by: Hideki Tasaka
He is the King of Phandavale as well Phandavale's Key. He is a kind hearted person (as described by the Three Musketeers). In the series, he spends most of his time in Cendrillon's castle as a prisoner. Even though he is in prison, he continues to smile and stay optimistic. He also has the ability to control wind magic. Age: 17.
Trude
Voiced by: Kaori Shimizu
Servant of Cendrillon. She is actually Souta's mother manipulated by Cendrillon's dark magic. She can turn anyone who looks into her eyes into a doll, as well as turn anything to stone.

== Episodes ==
1. Akazukin Finally Comes (赤ずきんがやってきた, Akazukin ga yatte kita) 2006-07-01
2. Magic Girl Snow White (魔法少女 白雪姫, Mahou shōjo Shirayukihime) 2006-07-08
3. The Interesting Transfer Student (気になる転校生, Ki ninaru tenkousei) 2006-07-15
4. Gretel's Trap (グレーテルの罠, Gretel no wana) 2006-07-22
5. The Awakening of the Thorn Princess (いばら姫の目覚め, Ibara hime no mezame) 2006-07-29
6. Sorry, Ringo (ごめんね、りんご, Gomen ne, Ringo) 2006-08-05
7. Our Journey (ぼくらの旅立ち, Bokura no Tabidachi) 2006-08-12
8. The Man With A Flute In His Heart (心に笛を持つ男, Kokoro ni Fue o motsu Otoko) 2006-08-19
9. Magic Hater Hans (魔法嫌いのハンス, Mahou Kirai no Hans) 2006-08-26
10. A Friend For A Thousand Years (千年の友達, Sennen no tomodachi) 2006-09-02
11. Souta and the Magician In Love (草太と恋する魔法使い, Souta to koi suru mahou tsukai) 2006-09-09
12. Secret Of the Cellar (地下室のひみつ, Chikashitsu no himitsu) 2006-09-16
13. Salamandra Village (サラマンドラの村, Salamandra no mura) 2006-09-23
14. The Okashi Forest's Memories (おかしな森の記憶, Okashi na mori no kioku) 2006-09-30
15. Trude's Maze (トゥルーデの迷宮, Trude no meikyuu) 2006-10-07
16. The Princess Of Thorns and Clover (いばら姫とクローバー, Ibarahime to clover) 2006-10-14
17. The City Where Ash Falls (灰の降る町, Hai no furu machi) 2006-10-21
18. The Three Singing Musketeers (うたう三銃士, Utau sanjuushi) 2006-10-28
19. The Same Moonlight (ムーンライトじゅ～すぅい～, ~Moonlight juusui~) 2006-11-04
20. Princess Akazukin (プリンセス赤ずきん, Princess Akazukin) 2006-11-11
21. Fernando's Present (フェレナンドの贈り物, Fernando no okurimono) 2006-11-18
22. The Bride Rapunzel (花嫁はラプンツェル, Hanayome wa Rapunzel) 2006-11-25
23. Glass Slippers (ガラスのくつ, Garasu no kutsu) 2006-12-02
24. Souta's Mother (草太のおかあさん, Souta no okaa-san) 2006-12-09
25. The Tiny Princess (ちいさなお姫さま, Chiisana ohimesama) 2006-12-16
26. Akazukin Vs. Snow White (赤ずきんVS白雪姫, Akazukin VS Shirayukihime) 2006-12-23
27. The Magic Castle (魔女の城, Mahou no shiro) 2007-01-06
28. The Dwarf's Flowerpot (ドワーフの植木鉢, Dwarf no uekibachi) 2007-01-13
29. Lonely Gretel (一人ぼっちグレーテル, Hitoribocchi Gretel) 2007-01-20
30. Wiese Village's Memories (ヴィーゼ村の思い出, Wiese-mura no omoide) 2007-01-27
31. Their Bond (ふたりの絆, Futari no kizuna) 2007-02-03
32. Eternally Bremen (ブレーメンよ永遠に, bure men yo eien ni) 2007-02-10
33. The Symbol of Friendship (仲間のしるし, nakama noshirushi) 2007-02-17
34. Hansel and Gretel (ヘンゼルとグレーテル, henzeru to gure teru) 2007-02-24
35. To the Sealed Land (封印の地へ, fuuin no chi he) 2007-03-03
36. The Key's Power (鍵のちから, kagi nochikara) 2007-03-10
37. The Story of Two Worlds (ふたつの世界の物語, futatsuno sekai no monogatari) 2007-03-17
38. Door to the Future (未来への扉, mirai heno tobira) 2007-03-24
39. Goodbye Akazukin (さよなら赤ずきん, sayonara Akazukin) 2007-03-31

== Theme songs ==
OVA

Opening theme
"Ever-Never-Land" by Yukari Tamura
Ending theme
"Clover" by marhy

Television series

Opening theme 1
"Dōwa Meikyū" (童話迷宮; lit. Fairytale Labyrinth) by Yukari Tamura
Opening theme 2
"Princess Rose" by Yukari Tamura
Ending theme 1
"Clover" by marhy
Ending theme 2
"Egao no Takaramono" (笑顔の宝物) by Yukari Tamura, Kanako Tateno and Miyuki Sawashiro
Ending theme 3
"CROSS ROAD" by marhy
Episode 18
Happy Loop by Yukari Tamura
Episode 18
Jasmine no Namida by Kanako Tateno
Episode 18
Yumesaki Garden by Miyuki Sawashiro
