= List of characters in Fire Emblem: Three Houses =

A large number of characters from Fire Emblem: Three Houses. From top left to bottom right, Marianne, Dedue, Lorenz, Raphael, Bernadetta, Leonie, Dimitri, Ignatz, Felix, Caspar, Hilda, Female Byleth, Ingrid, Sylvain, Mercedes, Male Byleth, Dorothea, Annette, Petra, Edelgard, Hubert, Linhardt, Claude, Ashe, Lysithea, and Ferdinand.

Fire Emblem: Three Houses is a tactical role-playing video game developed by Intelligent Systems and Koei Tecmo's Kou Shibusawa and published by Nintendo for the Nintendo Switch. It was released worldwide on July 26, 2019. It is the sixteenth entry in the Fire Emblem series and the first one for home consoles since Fire Emblem: Radiant Dawn, originally released in 2007.

Fire Emblem: Three Houses takes place on the continent of Fódlan, which is divided into three ruling powers. The game's main protagonist, Byleth, acts as a teacher at the Garreg Mach Monastery. They can teach for one of the three powers' classes: The Blue Lions, who are associated with the Holy Kingdom of Faerghus, the Golden Deer, associated with the Leicester Alliance, and the Black Eagles, associated with the Adrestian Empire. The game's main plot features multiple different story paths after a five-year timeskip, during which Byleth may either ally with one of the three powers or the Monastery.

== Development ==
Chinatsu Kurahana served as the game's lead character designer. She was chosen due to his prior work on Uta no Prince-sama, with the style employed there being used to help reinforce the "glamorous, aristocratic society" the various noble characters lived in. She directly influenced many design aspects of the various characters. The youth of the students was also a focus, with the game being built around their growth. The calendar system was also implemented into the game to make it so players had to pick and choose what they wanted to do and which characters they wished to interact with. The concept art for the game was contractually done by Kazuma Koda, known for his previous concept art of Bayonetta 2 and Nier: Automata. The game was primarily developed by Koei Tecmo, whose Scenario Team constructed much of the story's plot. While the Adrestian Empire acts as a primarily antagonistic faction, their presence in Garreg Mach as one of the three houses was used to highlight the peace that existed prior to the war.

Compared to previous games in the series, Three Houses was designed with the intention of getting to know every character equally, unlike past Fire Emblem games where characters are met one after another throughout the course of the plot. This new system allowed the player to explore each character's backstory with greater depth than in past installments. The time skip was based on the one featured in Genealogy of the Holy War, allowing for greater focus on the characters being forced to turn and fight against each other.

== Main characters ==
=== Byleth ===
Voiced by: Yūsuke Kobayashi (male), Shizuka Itō (female) (Japanese); Zach Aguilar (male), Jeannie Tirado (female) (English)

Byleth is the player avatar and main protagonist. Unlike in past games in the series, Byleth's appearance cannot be customized, but Byleth can be either male or female. Byleth is a stoic, emotionally distant mercenary who works with their father, Jeralt. After saving the nobles Edelgard, Dimitri, and Claude from an ambush, Byleth joins the Garreg Mach Monastery as a teacher alongside Jeralt. Byleth has a mysterious voice in their head, named Sothis, who is capable of rewinding time. Depending on who Byleth makes allegiances with during the game, they can have a variety of different endings. They can also engage in romantic relationships with other characters via the in-game support system.

Byleth reappears in Fire Emblem Warriors: Three Hopes, an alternate timeline of Three Houses. They act in an antagonistic role, nearly killing the game's protagonist Shez at the start of the game. Depending on the actions taken by Shez, Byleth can either stay an enemy or be recruited as an ally. Byleth, in both genders, appears in the mobile game Fire Emblem Heroes. Both genders have numerous alternate costumes in game. Byleth also appears in Super Smash Bros. Ultimate as a downloadable DLC fighter, and later received an amiibo.

=== Sothis ===
Voiced by: Tomoyo Kurosawa (Japanese); Cassandra Lee Morris (English)

Sothis is a mysterious girl who appears inside of Byleth's head. She is initially amnesiac, but has the power to turn back time. It is eventually revealed that Sothis is actually the progenitor god, who was implanted inside of Byleth when they were born in an attempt to resurrect her. An attempt to revive Sothis is made during the events of the game, but is interrupted by the arrival of Edelgard. She eventually merges her soul with Byleth's, no longer appearing before them. Sothis's child-like appearance was chosen to represent the fact she was half-way to being brought back, with her being unable to fully restore herself.

In Three Hopes, Sothis is capable of controlling Byleth's body, and does so on several occasions. Depending on the route, she either joins Shez alongside Byleth, or dies with them. Sothis appears in Fire Emblem Heroes, where she is a "Mythic Hero." She also appears in several alternative costumes. Sothis also appears in Super Smash Bros. Ultimate, where she appears in Byleth's Final Smash and as an unlockable Spirit, an in-game collectable. She also appears in Byleth's reveal trailer.

== Golden Deer ==
=== Claude von Riegan ===
Voiced by: Toshiyuki Toyonaga (Japanese); Joe Zieja (English)

Claude, true name Khalid, is the house leader of the Golden Deer, hailing from the Leicester Alliance. He was born in the neighboring nation of Almyra, but moved to the Leicester Alliance during his childhood. He seeks to open up Fódlan to the wider world to encourage a more open environment. Despite appearing very laidback, he is a cunning strategist. He later reappears in Three Hopes and Heroes, and appears in Super Smash Bros. Ultimate as a collectable spirit in his designs from before and after the timeskip.

=== Marianne von Edmund ===
Voiced by: Sawako Hata (Japanese); Xanthe Huynh (English)

Marianne is a member of the Golden Deer. She bears a Crest- a sigil passed down within a given family often enabling special powers- that allows her to communicate with animals. Throughout much of the game, she suffers from severe self-loathing and depression. Her ultimate fate has multiple different outcomes. She reappears in Fire Emblem Heroes.

=== Other members ===
Other members of the Golden Deer include:

Hilda Valentine Goneril

Voiced by: Yūki Kuwahara (Japanese); Salli Saffioti (English)

A lazy student who frequently manipulates other students into doing more strenuous tasks for her, and sister to Holst Sigiswald Goneril, a high-ranking commander in the alliance army who appears in Three Hopes. She acts as Claude's retainer in many situations.

Lysithea von Ordelia

Voiced by: Aoi Yūki (Japanese); Janice Kawaye (English)

A girl with two crests, which has drastically shortened her lifespan. She was added to Heroes alongside Bernadetta, Annette, and Ferdinand in the harmony amid chaos banner. She won Choose Your Legends 4, alongside Edelgard, Dimitri, and Claude, and got a brave alt because of it.

Leonie Pinelli

Voiced by: Sakura Nogawa (Japanese); Ratana (English)

A girl who idolizes Jeralt and trains to be as strong as him.

Lorenz Hellman Gloucester

Voiced by: Hiroshi Watanabe (Japanese); Ben Diskin (English)

A haughty and snobbish young man with an inflated ego.

Raphael Kirsten

Voiced by: Takaki Otomari (Japanese); Zachary T. Rice (English)

A friendly optimistic student who loves to eat and train.

Ignatz Victor

Voiced by: Shogo Yano (Japanese); Christian La Monte (English)

The community describes Ignatz as a polite and kind boy and a friend of Raphael. Ignatz is a skilled artist who wants to become a painter.

== Blue Lions ==
=== Dimitri Alexandre Blaiddyd ===
Voiced by: Kaito Ishikawa (Japanese); Chris Hackney (English)

Dimitri is the crown prince of the Holy Kingdom of Faerghus and leader of the Blue Lions. In his youth, he met and befriended Edelgard (although he did not know her true identity as the imperial princess and his sister by marriage at the time), and was later the sole survivor of the Tragedy of Duscur. When his Kingdom retaliated against Duscur, he saved the life of Dedue Molinaro, who became his retainer. Dimitri is chivalrous and kind, but becomes filled with bloodlust during battle. Following the timeskip, Dimitri suffers a mental breakdown, becoming practically insane in his efforts to kill Edelgard, with whom he is at war. His ultimate fate depends on the actions of Byleth during the war. He later reappears in Three Hopes and Heroes, and appears as a collectable Spirit in Super Smash Bros. Ultimate.

=== Other members ===
Other members of the Blue Lions include:

Dedue Molinaro

Voiced by: Hidenori Takahashi (Japanese); Ben Lepley (English)

Dimitri's retainer. A former resident of Duscur who was saved by Dimitri. Despite his gruff appearance, he enjoys cooking and tending to flowers. In the Azure Moon Route, after the timeskip, he is said to be dead, and will only cease to appear post-timeskip if the player did not complete his paralogue.

Felix Hugo Fraldarius

Voiced by: Yuichi Jose (Japanese); Lucien Dodge (English)

A sarcastic and cynical student who has a strong distaste in honor and chivalry. He enjoys fighting and sparring, along with spicy food. While he is shown to dislike sweets, support conversations with Lysithea say differently. He also is shown to dislike his father, for a statement said after his brother's death which caused him to become cynical and cold. He used to be close friends with Dimitri, until the former was horrified and disgusted upon witnessing the prince's bloodlust when they were putting down a rebellion in the western parts of the Kingdom two years before the start of the game, putting a serious strain on their friendship.

Sylvain Jose Gautier

Voiced by: Makoto Furukawa (Japanese); Joe Brogie (English)

A student who attempts to flirt with many other female students.

Ashe Ubert

Voiced by: Yuuki Inoue (Japanese); Shannon McKain (English)

An optimistic young boy.

Mercedes von Martritz

Voiced by: Yumiri Hanamori (Japanese); Dorothy Elias-Fahn (English)

A positive and highly religious girl.

Annette Fantine Dominic

Voiced by: Takako Tanaka (Japanese); Abby Trott (English)

A cheerful and positive cook.

Ingrid Brandl Galatea

Voiced by: Manaka Iwami (Japanese); Brittany Cox (English)

A girl who dreams of becoming a knight of Faerghus.

== Black Eagles ==
=== Edelgard von Hresvelg ===
Voiced by: Ai Kakuma (Japanese); Tara Platt (English)

Edelgard is the princess of the Adrestian Empire, and leader of the Black Eagles. Edelgard was experimented on in her childhood by Those Who Slither In The Dark, resulting in her having a second crest. This made her dislike Crests and the Church. As a result, she attempts to destroy Garreg Mach during the events of the game, at first doing so under the guise of the Flame Emperor. After being revealed, she drops the disguise and fights as herself. Depending on the route taken, Byleth can either assist Edelgard in her conquest, or fight against her. In the Azure Moon route, she adopts the persona of Hegemon Edelgard, a monstrous form of Edelgard that acts as the final boss of said route. She reappears in Three Hopes and Heroes, and in Super Smash Bros. Ultimate as a collectable Spirit.

=== Bernadetta von Varley ===
Voiced by: Ayumi Tsuji (Japanese); Erica Mendez (English)

Bernadetta is a member of the Black Eagles. She is a recluse and incredibly shy, spending most of her time in her room. This is due to physical and mental abuses suffered by her father in her childhood. She later reappears in Three Hopes and Heroes.

=== Dorothea Arnault ===
Voiced by: Juri Nagatsuma (Japanese); Allegra Clark (English)

Dorothea is a member of the Black Eagles. She is a singer who grew up as an urchin on the street after her father abandoned her. She is flirtatious, as she seeks to find someone who can support her when she grows old. She reappears in Three Hopes and Heroes.

=== Petra Macneary ===
Voiced by: Shizuka Ishigami (Japanese); Faye Mata (English)

Petra Macneary was raised as a hostage in the Adrestian Empire after her nation of Brigid failed to rebel against the Empire, attending as a school of Garreg Mach as part of its Black Eagles group. She is initially depicted as not having a strong grasp of the language of Fodlan, but becomes more fluent after years have passed.

Petra has been generally well received. The Mary Sue writer Madeline Carpou commented that they "side-eye[d]" the Black Eagles for forgetting that she was a prisoner of war, feeling that the alienation of foreign cultures in games like Three Houses was too easily remedied. They praised the sequel, Three Hopes, for establishing a relationship between her and Dedue, another foreigner, allowing them to support each other in their progress. Writers Rebecca Katherine Britt and PS Berge identify her as one of the few racially diverse characters in the game, noting that fan content often represented that fact. RPGFan writer Kyle Kortvely considered Petra one of his favorite characters in the game, commenting that he intentionally played in English instead of Japanese because of her broken English in this version.

Petra's relationship with Dorothea, nicknamed "Doropetra", has been a generally popular one, though The Mary Sue writer Princess Weekes was surprised that their relationship was not more popular. They noted that part of this popularity came from the view that their ending together was romantic in nature, and that Petra otherwise has no other actual or potential queer endings with other female characters. They also discussed how fan content of their relationship is made more explicit than the canon moments between them. Gayming Mag writer Aimee Hart considered them an underrated ship, praising the ship due to Dorothea's goal of finding someone who would care for her when she loses her looks, and how romantic it is for Petra to sweep her off her feet as a princess. Hart appreciated that Petra did not shame Dorothea for wanting to find stability, praising the story for depicting Dorothea as Petra's most-loved person in their paired ending.

=== Other members ===
Other members of the Black Eagles include:

Hubert von Vestra

Voiced by: Katsuyuki Konishi (Japanese); Robbie Daymond (English)

Edelgard's loyal retainer.

Ferdinand von Aegir

Voiced by: Taito Ban (Japanese); Billy Kametz (2019–2022) (English)

An overconfident noble.

Linhardt von Hevring

Voiced by: Shun Horie (Japanese); Chris Patton (English)

A student who frequently naps.

Caspar von Bergliez

Voiced by: Satoru Murakami (Japanese); Ben Diskin (English)

A headstrong young boy.

Monica von Ochs

Voiced by: Marika Kōno (Japanese); Colleen O'Shaughnessey (English)

A girl who is kidnapped by Those Who Slither In The Dark and used as a disguise by their operative, Kronya.

== Other ==
=== Jeralt Reus Eisner ===
Voiced by: Akio Otsuka (Japanese); David Lodge (English)

Jeralt is Byleth's father. Prior to the events of the game, he worked at Garreg Mach, where he met and married his wife. However, after she died giving birth to Byleth, he fled with the child, fearing for their safety in Garreg Mach due to Rhea's involvement in their birth. He became the leader of a band of mercenaries, but after saving Dimitri, Edelgard, and Claude, he returns to the Monastery, where he retains his prior job as a Knight. Jeralt is eventually killed by Kronya. He reappears in Three Hopes and Heroes, and works alongside Byleth in the former game as part of his mercenary group.

=== Jeritza von Hyrm ===
Voiced by: Atsushi Imaruoka (Japanese); Patrick Seitz (English)

The younger half brother of Mercedes, from whom he was separated at a young age, Jeritza is a teacher at the Monastery. Unbeknownst to many, he hides a secret bloodlust and homicidal split personality known as the Death Knight, and has slaughtered many in his youth. He is an ally of Edelgard and the Adrestian Empire, and assists their efforts during the war phase. He later reappears in Three Hopes and Heroes.

=== Rhea ===
Voiced by: Kikuko Inoue (Japanese); Cherami Leigh (English)

Rhea is the archbishop of Garreg Mach Monastery, and has served as such for some time. She was one of Sothis's children, and has attempted to revive her mother by implanting her soul into various constructed bodies. One of these, Byleth's mother, did not succeed, but Rhea cared deeply for her, and implanted the Crest of Flames into Byleth to save their life at their mother's request. Rhea's true identity is that of Seiros, a god-like figure in the lore of Fódlan. Depending on actions taken during the game, Rhea can either work together with Byleth, or end up dying alongside the Church.

=== Those Who Slither In The Dark ===
Those Who Slither In The Dark are the overarching antagonists of Three Houses. They were once the nation of Agartha, and denounced Sothis as the Goddess. They warred against her, only to be utterly annihilated and forced underground, where they manipulated events from behind the scenes. They ally with the Adrestian Empire in the main game, though the Empire does not agree with their ideals. Notable members include:

Thales

Voiced by: Masaki Terasoma (Japanese); Christopher Corey Smith (English)

The leader of Those Who Slither In The Dark.

Solon

Voiced by: Shinya Fukumatsu (Japanese); Joe Ochman (English)

A member of Those Who Slither In The Dark who attempted to kill Byleth.

Kronya

Voiced by: Marika Kōno (Japanese); Colleen O'Shaughnessey (English)

A woman who disguises herself as Monica in order to kill Byleth's father Jeralt.

=== Nemesis ===
Voiced by: Naomi Kusumi (Japanese); Jamieson Price (English)

Known as the Liberation King, Nemesis opposed the goddess Seiros centuries prior to the events of Three Houses. He wields the Sword of the Creator, the weapon which Byleth uses in-game. According to legend, Nemesis was corrupted by the Sword and fought Seiros due to this, but it is revealed that Nemesis was originally a bandit, and he and ten others were transformed into Nemesis and the Ten Elites by Those Who Slither in the Dark. He fought Seiros of his own accord alongside them. He is later resurrected during the game's Verdant Wind route, where he is defeated by Claude and Byleth. He reappears in Fire Emblem Heroes.

=== Seteth and Flayn ===
Voiced by: Takehito Koyasu (Seteth), Yūko Ōno (Flayn) (Japanese); Mark Whitten (Seteth), Deva Marie Gregory (Flayn) (English)

Seteth is the second in command at the Monastery, serving Rhea loyally. Despite putting up the public image of him being Flayn's older sibling, Seteth is actually Flayn's father, and their true identity is that of the Saints Cichol and Cethleann. Following an important battle, Flayn was placed into a dormant state for many years to recuperate. As a result, she is rather naive due to having missed much of history. Seteth hides their identities for their own safety.

=== Gatekeeper ===
Voiced by: Shinobu Matsumoto (Japanese); Kyle McCarley (English)

The Gatekeeper is a gatekeeper who works at Garreg Mach. He informs Byleth of various comings and goings, though he is implied to be rather mediocre at his job. Despite being a minor NPC, the Gatekeeper became a widely popular character among fans of the game, going on to inspire large amounts of fanworks due to his endearing personality. He was later voted into Fire Emblem Heroes as a "Legendary Hero," beating out major player characters like Marth and Eirika by nearly double the votes. He was later added as a playable character to Fire Emblem Warriors: Three Hopes.

== Reception ==
The characters of Fire Emblem: Three Houses have received a generally positive reception since the game's release. The game's wide variety of characters and personalities have been praised, both for their relatability and their emotion. They have been cited as a well-rounded and engaging cast, with their interactions with the protagonist, Byleth, being a particular highlight. The morally grey characterization of the various factions during the war phase of the game, with their dubious mix of good and evil helping build the depth of their characters. The inability to satisfy the wishes of every character was highlighted as well, as it forced the player to decide which characters they wished to side with. Alanna Okun, writing for Polygon, highlighted this depth, stating that "...you become intensely acquainted with their quirks and proclivities... It would be hard to overstate how much I think about these people who don’t exist, how many soft spots I’ve developed for two dozen fictional students living in the year 1181. Whenever I play, which is practically every day now, I feel made of soft spots." She also highlighted the comfort that many of the in-game support conversations provided for her. The interactions characters have with the world were also highlighted, with the interactions and storylines of characters helping to make the monastery "feel alive." The game's "lost items" system, which involved Byleth returning lost items to their owners, received positive commentary, citing how it helped build depth with the cast. The cast of the game has been widely popular with fans, spawning large amounts of fanart and fanwork. Many specific members of the cast have also been met with particular praise for their various storylines.
