= Marianne von Edmund =

Fire Emblem: Three Houses character

- Fire Emblem character
- Marianne von Edmund in Fire Emblem Heroes
- First game: Fire Emblem: Three Houses (2019)
- Designed by: Chinatsu Kurahana
- Voiced by: EN: Xanthe Huynh; JA: Sawako Hata

In-universe information
- Gender: Female
- Affiliation: Golden Deer (Three Houses); Golden Wildfire (Three Hopes)
- Family: Margrave Edmund (adoptive father)

Marianne von Edmund (Japanese: マリアンヌ＝フォン＝エドマンド, Hepburn: Mariannu fon Edomando) is a character in the 2019 video game Fire Emblem: Three Houses. She is a member of the Golden Deer house, led by Claude, and has self-worth issues influenced by a curse tied to her Crest. She has multiple relationships she can form in the game, including Hilda, Dimitri, and the protagonist, Byleth. She was designed by Chinatsu Kurahana. Marianne also appears in the side story Fire Emblem Warriors: Three Hopes as well as the crossover mobile game Fire Emblem Heroes. She was voiced by Sawako Hata in Japanese, and Xanthe Huynh in English.

She has received generally positive reception, with multiple critics finding her self-worth issues relatable.

== Appearances ==
Marianne first appears in Fire Emblem: Three Houses as a playable character. She is a student of Garreg Mach Academy, and a member of the Golden Deer house, led by Claude von Riegan. She is available by default should players choose the Golden Deer house, but she can also be recruited if they choose the Blue Lions and Black Eagles if certain conditions are met. She is able to have support conversations with various characters in the game, including Claude, Hilda Valentine Goneril, and the protagonist, Byleth. Marianne is depicted as a religious individual who frequently prays to the goddess and likes animals. She was adopted by the wealthy Margrave Edmund, eager to earn his House's place in a social system that values having family members bearing Crests in their blood. She and her father keep the true nature of her Crest vague, however. If her optional story is pursued, it is revealed that her Crest, which is called the "Crest of the Beast", is feared and considered cursed.

After a five-year timeskip, a war started by Edelgard von Hresvelg to unite Fodlan and check the power of the Church of Seiros is still continuing. Marianne will join Byleth's allies if Byleth is working with the Golden Deer, or she was recruited into the rival groups Blue Lions or Black Eagles; if she was not recruited. She is accused of secretly transforming into a beast and hunting innocent people at night, leading Byleth, Marianne, and their allies to hunt down the real beast, Maurice, a distant ancestor who succumbed to the power of his Crest. Marianne is the owner of a Hero's Relic, a sword called Blutgang, tied to her Crest.

Marianne also appears as a playable character in Fire Emblem Warriors: Three Hopes, an alternate story that takes place two years after the beginning of Three Houses and examines what would happen if Byleth had not become a teacher at the school. She is available on the Golden Wildfire route, but she can also be recruited on the Scarlet Blaze and Azure Gleam routes if the player fulfills certain requirements. She specializes in ice-based magic, and her favorite horse, Dorte, appears in one of her in-game animations. Marianne also appears in Fire Emblem Heroes as a playable character. In the 2021 "Choose Your Legends" contest, where players vote to pick who should get a special variant, Marianne was the #1 female character, beating Eirika from Fire Emblem: Sacred Stones. She was found to have been more popular among regular players, whereas Eirika was more popular with players who had taken a break. She and Gatekeeper became a trending topic on Twitter due to their success. The design of her new form, based on a dancer's outfit in Three Houses, was illustrated by Toshiyuki Kusakihara.

== Concept and creation ==
Concept art of Marianne illustrated by Chinatsu Kurahana in the official game art book Fire Emblem: Three Houses - Fódlan Art Book

Marianne was created by Chinatsu Kurahana for the video game Fire Emblem: Three Houses. Marianne has self-worth issues, owing to a curse associated with her Crest. She also has a love for animals. When making her design for Fire Emblem Warriors: Three Hopes, character designer Toshiyuki Kusakihara discussed how he designed her and others with the idea of how they might look had they never met Byleth. She is voiced by Sawako Hata in Japanese and by Xanthe Huynh in English.

== Reception ==
Marianne has been generally positively received. She ranked ninth among female characters on a Famitsu poll of Japanese readers. Kotaku writer Gita Jackson discussed how she approached Marianne in order to help her open up, initially perceiving her as someone suffering from a lack of confidence. However, she recognized that there was more to her than a lack of confidence, discussing how the exploration of her trauma and how it informs her actions helped them in her own healing journey. She related to Marianne's self-loathing and shame, discussing a scene where Claude helped Marianne come to terms with the burden she shoulders by relating to her struggles with being seen as a monster. GamesRadar+ writer Heather Wald noted that early on, she was drawn to Marianne due to her shy demeanor, as well as the fact that one of her dislikes was 'herself'. Wald felt she was relatable, motivating her to help Marianne, including by surrounding her with others to be her friends. While she noted that all characters have their own burdens to bear, she continued to fixate on Marianne, finding her character growth especially meaningful. She praised her timeskip design, finding her unrecognizable in it, and feeling it showed a brighter Marianne. Wald discussed how Marianne's self-perception as a monster caused her to develop an understandable lack of self worth. She felt happy to see Marianne progress, noting how participating in Marianne's journey helped her own journey towards liking herself.

The Mary Sue writer Madeline Carpou expressed adoration for the character, stating that she "easily wins the player's heart" and appreciating that Three Hopes gave Marianne a support conversation with Bernadetta von Varley. She felt worried that the conversation would be "needlessly uncomfortable," but loved that they practiced socializing together, questioning whether there was shipping potential between them. She also appreciated that Marianne got a support conversation with Ingrid, whom she felt ambivalent about until this scene, stating that Marianne "deserved all the love she got in this game." Fanbyte writer LB hunktears enjoyed both the relationships between Marianne and Dimitri, as well as Marianne and Hilda. They thought that Marianne and Dimitri bonding over shared self-hatred with monstrous dark sides was an unhealthy basis for a relationship, but an interesting one; and that Marianne and Hilda could make an endearing couple. Gayming Mag writer Aimee Hart noted that the ship between Marianne and Hilda was a popular female-female ship on fanfiction website Archive of Our Own.
