= Faye Mata =

American voice actress

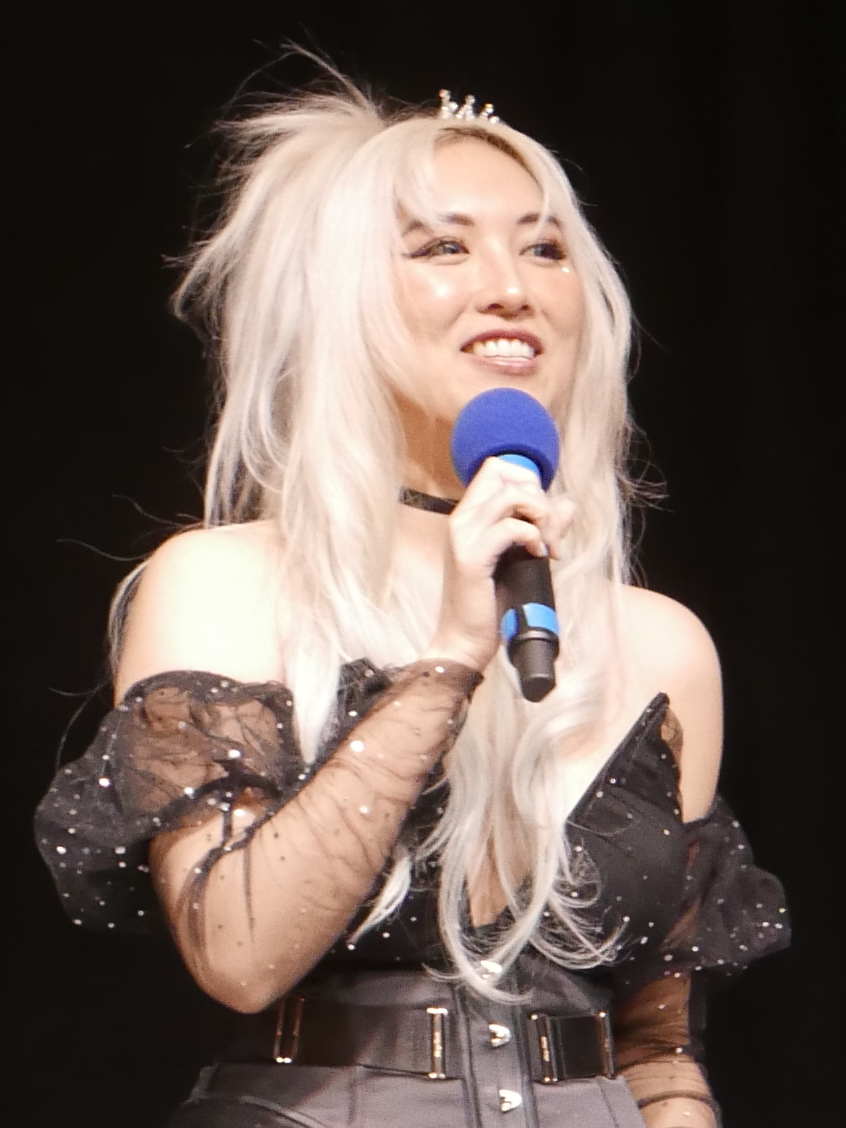
- Mata in 2024
- Born: Kenosha,Wisconsin, U.S.
- Occupation: Voice actress
- Years active: 2014–present

Faye Mata is an American voice actress best known for her work in English dubs of anime. Her roles include Aqua in KonoSuba, Astolfo/Rider of Black in Fate/Apocrypha, Lulu in League of Legends, Petra Macneary in Fire Emblem: Three Houses and Fire Emblem Warriors: Three Hopes, Yukie Shikako in Godzilla Singular Point, Kagami Tsurugi in Miraculous: Tales of Ladybug & Cat Noir, Jade in Honkai Star Rail, and Dot/Nidothing in Pokémon Horizons: The Series.

== Gaming career ==
In addition to her voice acting career, Mata has been heavily involved in various game tournaments. She particularly participated in Pokkén Tournament and Super Smash Bros. Brawl tournaments, achieving substantial notoriety in gaming circles.

While Mata no longer continues to actively participate in tournaments, she continues to do charity streams via Twitch where she typically plays Super Smash Bros. Ultimate, and is also signed with the esports team Panda. She has also hosted video game tournaments for charity. The most recent of these was for Voices for a Change, where money was raised for The Bail Project.

== Philanthropy and charity ==
Mata has contributed to Black Girls Code, Girls Who Code, and the Tyrone Gayle Scholars Program.

In addition to supporting these charities, she has also donated to Direct Relief during the 2020 COVID-19 Pandemic. Using Twitch as the platform, she raised money by having viewers challenge her in Super Smash Bros. Ultimate, where they could be chosen by random draw, or donate to the charity to be put into a priority queue.

== Filmography ==
Note that all years listed are for North American publication date.

=== Voice acting ===
==== Anime ====
Year	Title	Role	Notes	Source
2014	Magi: The Labyrinth of Magic	Tiare		
2014	Gargantia on the Verdurous Planet	Linaria		
2015	Nagi-Asu: A Lull in the Sea	Kaori Akiyoshi		
2015	Heroes: Legend of the Battle Disks	Sophie Vulkay		
2016	Love Live! School Idol Project	Rin Hoshizora		
2016	The Asterisk War	Violet Weinberg		
2017	Occultic;Nine	Ryouka Narusawa		
2017	Hunter × Hunter	Neon Nostrade/Amana		
2018	B The Beginning	Lily Hoshina		
2018	Kakegurui – Compulsive Gambler	Yumemi Yumemite		
2018	Back Street Girls	Yui Nakamura		
2018	JoJo's Bizarre Adventure: Diamond Is Unbreakable	Yukako Yamagishi		
2018	Fate/Apocrypha	Astolfo/Rider of Black		
2018	Sword Gai: The Animation	Midoriko		
2018	Sword Art Online Alternative Gun Gale Online	Fukaziroh/Miyu Shinohara		
2018	Granblue Fantasy: The Animation	Sierokarte		
2018–2021	Re:Zero − Starting Life in Another World	Priscilla Barielle, Frederica Baumann (Season 1), Rem (Baby)		
2019	Konosuba: God's Blessing on this Wonderful World!	Aqua		
2019	Gundam Build Divers	Kanari		
2019	Sailor Moon Sailor Stars	Sailor Aluminum Siren/Reiko Aya		
2019	The Rising of the Shield Hero	Malty S. Melromarc		
2019–2020	Isekai Quartet	Aqua		
2020	Japan Sinks: 2020	Ayumu		
2020	Magia Record: Puella Magi Madoka Magica Side Story	Kuroe		
2021	Godzilla Singular Point	Kanoko (Shikako)	Netflix dub	
2021	Bottom-tier Character Tomozaki	Aoi Hinami		
2021–2022	Yashahime: Princess Half-Demon	Aiya		
2022	Tekken: Bloodline	Ling Xiaoyu		
2023–present	Pokémon Horizons: The Series	Dot/Nidothing, Terapagos		

==== Animation ====
Year	Title	Role	Notes	Source
2018–present	Miraculous: Tales of Ladybug & Cat Noir	Kagami Tsurugi/Ryuko		
2018–2021	Lego Friends: Girls on a Mission	Emma	70 episodes	
2019	Hazbin Hotel	Katie Killjoy	Episode: "That's Entertainment"	
2020	Deathstroke: Knights & Dragons	H.I.V.E Queen/Jade		
2023	Helluva Boss	Glitz and Glam	Episode: "Mammon's Magnificent Musical Mid-Season Special (ft Fizzarolli)"	

==== Film ====
Year	Title	Role	Notes	Source
2016	Love Live! The School Idol Movie	Rin Hoshizora		
2018	Accel World: Infinite Burst	Lemon Pierrette/Suntan Schafe		
2019	White Snake	Precious Jade Workshop Foxy Boss		
2021	KonoSuba: God's Blessing on This Wonderful World! Legend of Crimson	Aqua		
2021	Detective Conan: Sunflowers of Inferno	Umeno (young)		
2023	Sailor Moon Cosmos	Sailor Aluminum Siren/Reiko Aya		

==== Video games ====
Year	Title	Role	Notes	Source
2014	Detective Grimoire	The Little Girl		
2016	Grand Kingdom	Precia Teller		
2016	Superdimension Neptune vs Sega Hard Girls	Mega Drive		
2018	Detective Pikachu	Additional voices		
2018	Fire Emblem Heroes	Lene	Mobile Game	
2018	Food Fantasy	Various Voices	Mobile Game	
2018	Octopath Traveler	Yusufa		
2019	Zanki Zero: Last Beginning	Moi Mashiro, Creature of Gluttony, Creature of Lust, Female Creature, Obese Creature, Girl 1, Female Scientist A		
2019	Death end re;Quest	Celica		
2019	Fire Emblem: Three Houses	Petra		
2019	Lovers of Aether	Fleet		
2019	Dead or Alive 6	NiCO		
2020	Sakuna: Of Rice and Ruin	Kaimaru		
2020	Granblue Fantasy Versus	Metera, Sierokarte		
2020	Phantasy Star Online 2	Hariette Renata Reina Cuento, Shiva		
2020	Death end re;Quest 2	Celica		
2020	One-Punch Man: A Hero Nobody Knows	Additional voices		
2021	Nier Reincarnation	Noelle	Mobile game	
2021	Shadowverse	Bloodsucker of the Night, Mavela, Flowing Lancer, Carmia		
2021	Lost Judgment	Emily S. Mochizuki		
2021	Terrain of Magical Expertise	Flamegirl		
2021	Re:Zero − Starting Life in Another World: The Prophecy of the Throne	Priscilla Barielle		
2022	Guardian Tales	Sumire		
2022	Star Ocean: The Divine Force	Lola Jornaus		
2022	AI: The Somnium Files – Nirvana Initiative	Amame Doi		
2022	Fire Emblem Warriors: Three Hopes	Petra		
2022	Relayer	Dark Walker		
2022	Rune Factory 5	Elsje		
2022	Daemon X Machina	Chill		
2023	Dungeons of Aether	Fleet		
2023	Street Fighter 6	A.K.I.		
2023	Granblue Fantasy Versus: Rising	Metera, Sierokarte		
2024	Like a Dragon: Infinite Wealth	Additional voices		
2024	Granblue Fantasy: Relink	Sierokarte		
2024	Rivals of Aether II	Fleet		
2024	Honkai: Star Rail	Jade		
2024	Yars Rising	Malorie "Mal" Foster		
2025	Like a Dragon: Pirate Yakuza in Hawaii	Additional voices		
