= Jeannie Tirado =

American voice actress (born 1990)

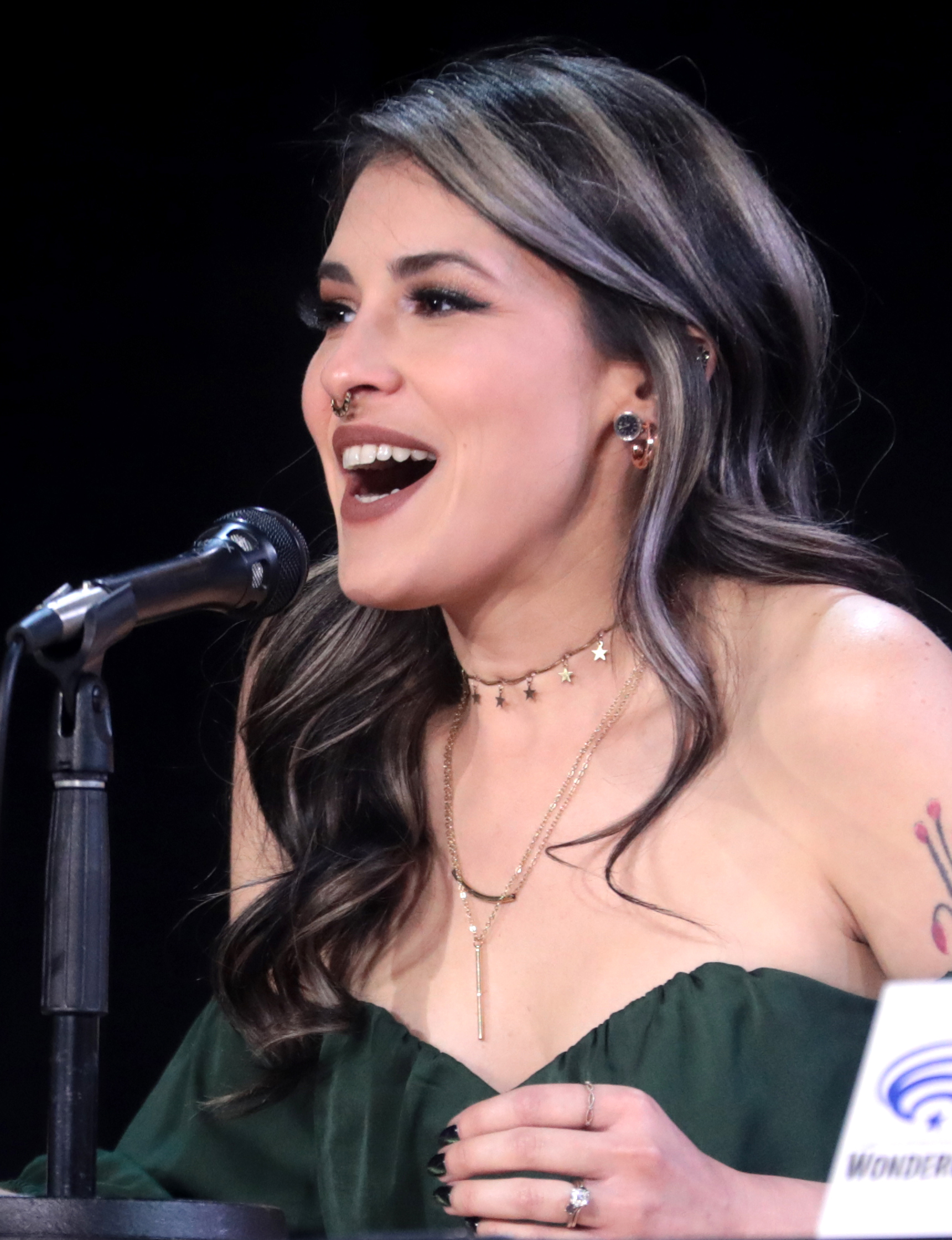
- Tirado in 2023
- Born: July 19, 1990 (age 36); Orlando, Florida, U.S.
- Occupation: Voice actress
- Years active: 2009–present
- Notable credits: Fairy Tail Zero as Zera; Code Geass: Akito the Exiled as Leila Malcal; KanColle: Kantai Collection as Kaga; Dragon Ball FighterZ as Android 21; Fire Emblem: Three Houses as Byleth (female); Love Live! Sunshine!! as Riko Sakurauchi; Resident Evil Village as Rosemary "Rose" Winters
- Spouse: John Riding (m. 2021)
- Website: www.jeannietirado.com

Jeannie Tirado (born July 19, 1990) is an American voice actress. Some of her noteworthy roles include Zera in Fairy Tail Zero, Leila Malcal in Code Geass: Akito the Exiled, Kaga in KanColle: Kantai Collection, Android 21 in Dragon Ball FighterZ, Norman in The Promised Neverland, Riko in Love Live! Sunshine!!, and female Byleth in Fire Emblem: Three Houses.

== Biography ==
Tirado was born on July 19, 1990, and raised in Orlando, Florida. She is of Puerto Rican descent. Growing up, Tirado was a fan of Disney films, especially The Little Mermaid and Beauty and the Beast; this inspired her to pursue a career in voice acting. Tirado graduated from college with a degree in music and worked as a vocalist for various albums, before switching to voice acting. On October 24, 2021, Tirado married John Riding.

== Filmography ==
=== Anime ===
List of voice performances in anime
Year	Title	Role	Notes	Source
2016	Grimgar of Fantasy and Ash	Yume		
2016	Fairy Tail Zero	Zera		
2016	Three Leaves, Three Colors	Futaba Odagiri		
2016	Love Live! Sunshine!!	Riko Sakurauchi		
2016	Tales of Zestiria the X	Clemm, Linda		
2016	Castle Town Dandelion	Teru Sakurada		
2016	Chaos Dragon	Mashiro		
2016	Orange	Takako Chino		
2016	ReLIFE	Chizuru Hishiro		
2016	Kiss Him, Not Me	Kae Serinuma		
2017	All Out!!	Umeno		
2017	Luck & Logic	Yukari		
2017	Fuuka	Koyuki Hinashi		
2017	Dragon Ball Super	Pan (baby)		
2017	Masamune-kun's Revenge	Mari Mizuno		
2017	Code Geass: Akito the Exiled	Leila Malcal		
2017	The Saga of Tanya the Evil	Viktoriya Ivanovna Serebryakov		
2017	Yamada-kun and the Seven Witches	Mikoto Asuka		
2017	Tsugumomo	Kasumi		
2017	Clockwork Planet	Ryuzu		
2017	KanColle: Kantai Collection	Kaga		
2017	Restaurant to Another World	Adelheid		
2017	A Centaur's Life	Ruru Shizuura		
2017	Kakegurui	Miri Yobami, Nozomi Komabami		
2017	Knight's & Magic	Adeltrud		
2017	Tsuredure Children	Satsuki Sasahara		
2017	Dies Irae	Rusalka Schwagelin		
2017	The Ancient Magus' Bride	Yule Twin A		
2017	Star Blazers: Space Battleship Yamato 2199	Akira Yamamoto, Susumu Kodai (young)		
2017	Myriad Colors Phantom World	Koito Minase		
2017	King's Game The Animation	Matsuoka		
2017	Anime-Gataris	Ayame		
2018	Katana Maidens: Toji No Miko	Hiyori		
2018	Basilisk	Rui		
2018	Ace Attorney	April May		
2018	Darling in the Franxx	Kokoro		
2018	Tokyo Ghoul:re	Kanae von Rosewald		
2018	Overlord III	Nemu Emmott		
2018	A Certain Magical Index III	Megumi Teshio		
2018	Beyblade Burst Turbo	Laban Vanot, Maid 2		
2019	Record of Grancrest War	Siluca Meletes		
2019	Sword Art Online Alternative Gun Gale Online	Shirley		
2019	Sword Art Online: Alicization	Sortiliena Serlut		
2019	Carole & Tuesday	Carole Stanley		
2019	The Promised Neverland	Norman		
2019	Black Clover	Fana		
2019	Fire Force	Sputter		
2019	Kono Oto Tomare! Sounds of Life	Keishi Dojima (young)		
2019	Isekai Quartet	Viktoriya Ivanovna Serebryakov		
2019	If It's for My Daughter, I'd Even Defeat a Demon Lord	Rita Kreuger		
2020	Ghost in the Shell: SAC_2045	Takashi Shimamura (young)		
2020	My Next Life as a Villainess: All Routes Lead to Doom!	Catarina Claes		
2020	Ascendance of a Bookworm	Lutz		
2020	Tower of God	Endorsi Jahad		
2020	Dragon's Dogma	Louis		
2020	I'm Standing on a Million Lives	Iu Shindō		
2020	Monster Girl Doctor	Cthulhy Squele		
2022	Lycoris Recoil	Sakura Otome		
2022	Show by Rock!! Stars!!	Hundreko		
2022	Tekken: Bloodline	Julia Chang		
2022	Bleach: Thousand-Year Blood War	Tier Halibel, Mashiro Kuna, Senjumaru Shutara		
2023	Demon Slayer: Kimetsu no Yaiba – Swordsmith Village Arc	Kotetsu	Season 3	
2023	Jujutsu Kaisen	Misato Kuroi	Season 2	
2024	Seven Deadly Sins: Four Knights of the Apocalypse	Tristan Liones		
2024	The Elusive Samurai	Kojiro		
2024	Code Geass: Rozé of the Recapture	Leila Malcal		
2025	Übel Blatt	Peepi		
2026	Fate/strange Fake	Assassin		

=== Animation ===
List of voice performances in animation
Year	Title	Role	Notes	Source
2019	YooHoo to the Rescue	Alisha, Polar Bear Cub B, Otis		
2019	Marvel Rising: Playing with Fire	Gabriela "Gabi" Pertuz, Teacher		
2021	FriendZSpace	Kim		
2022	Spirit Rangers	Cindy		
2023	Harley Quinn	Volcana, various voices		
2024	Arcane	Felicia	Episode: "Blisters and Bedrocks"	
2026	Cow Squad	Olivia, Local Cow	2 episodes	
2026	Daffy Season	Lola Bunny	Short film	

=== Films ===
List of voice performances in animation
Year	Title	Role	Notes	Source
2017	One Piece Film: Gold	Koala		
2017	Genocidal Organ	Lucie Skroupova		
2018	High Speed! Free! Starting Days	Akane Shiina		
2020	Digimon Adventure: Last Evolution Kizuna	Yolei Inoue		
2020	Soul	Principal Arroyo		
2022	Bubble	Hibiki (young)		
2022	Dragon Ball Super: Super Hero	Pan		
2023	Justice League x RWBY: Super Heroes & Huntsmen	Green Lantern / Jessica Cruz		
2024	Maboroshi	Mutsumi Sagami	Lead role	
2024	Mobile Suit Gundam: Silver Phantom	Female Protagonist	VR film, lead role	
2024	My Oni Girl	Mio Takahashi		
2026	Cosmic Princess Kaguya!	Kaguya	Lead role	

=== Video games ===
List of voice performances in video games
Year	Title	Role	Notes	Source
2018	Dragon Ball FighterZ	Android 21		
2018	Epic Seven	Arowell, Nemunas, Rose		
2018	Just Cause 4	People of Solis		
2019	Zanki Zero: Last Beginning	Minamo Setouchi, Female Creature, Mimic Creature		
2019	Fire Emblem: Three Houses	Byleth (Female)		
2019	Street Fighter V	Lucia	DLC	
2019	Pokémon Masters	Winona, Sophocles		
2019	Conception Plus: Maidens of the Twelve Stars	Lillith/Lillie		
2020	Dragon Ball Z: Kakarot	Female Researcher, Gatchan 1, Gatchan 2		
2020	Super Smash Bros. Ultimate	Byleth (Female)	DLC	
2020	Dragon Ball Legends	Android 21, Kid Pan		
2020	Guardian Tales	Alef		
2020	Fallout 76	Commander Sofia Daguerre, The Eye, Settlers	(Wastelanders update)	
2020	Doom Eternal	UAC Scientists, UAC Spokesperson		
2020	Final Fantasy VII Remake	Claudia Strife		
2020	Genshin Impact	Kujou Sara		
2021	League Of Legends	Vex		
2021	Cookie Run: Kingdom	Alchemist Cookie		
2021	Shin Megami Tensei V	Tao Isonokami		
2021	Resident Evil Village	Rosemary Winters		
2022	Horizon Forbidden West	Milu, Eileen Sasaki, Lunda		
2022	WWE 2K22	Female MyPlayer	Main Role	
2022	Relayer	Additional voices		
2022	Fire Emblem Warriors: Three Hopes	Byleth (Female)		
2022	Tower of Fantasy	Echo	Credited in-game	
2022	Saints Row	Neenah		
2022	Resident Evil Village: Shadows of Rose	Rosemary Winters	DLC	
2022	Goddess of Victory: Nikke	Frima, iDoll Sun, D	Credited in-game	
2022	God of War Ragnarök	Valkyrie, additional roles		
2023	Octopath Traveler II	Ori		
2023	The Legend of Nayuta: Boundless Trails	Erislette, Sasha		
2023	Cookie Run: The Darkest Night	Alchemist Cookie		
2023	Sonic Dream Team	Ariem	Credited in-game	
2024	Silent Hill: The Short Message	Anita Planert (voice)	Credited in-game	
2024	Unicorn Overlord	Celeste	Credited in-game	
TBA	Deadlock	Ivy		
