= Zach Aguilar =

American voice actor

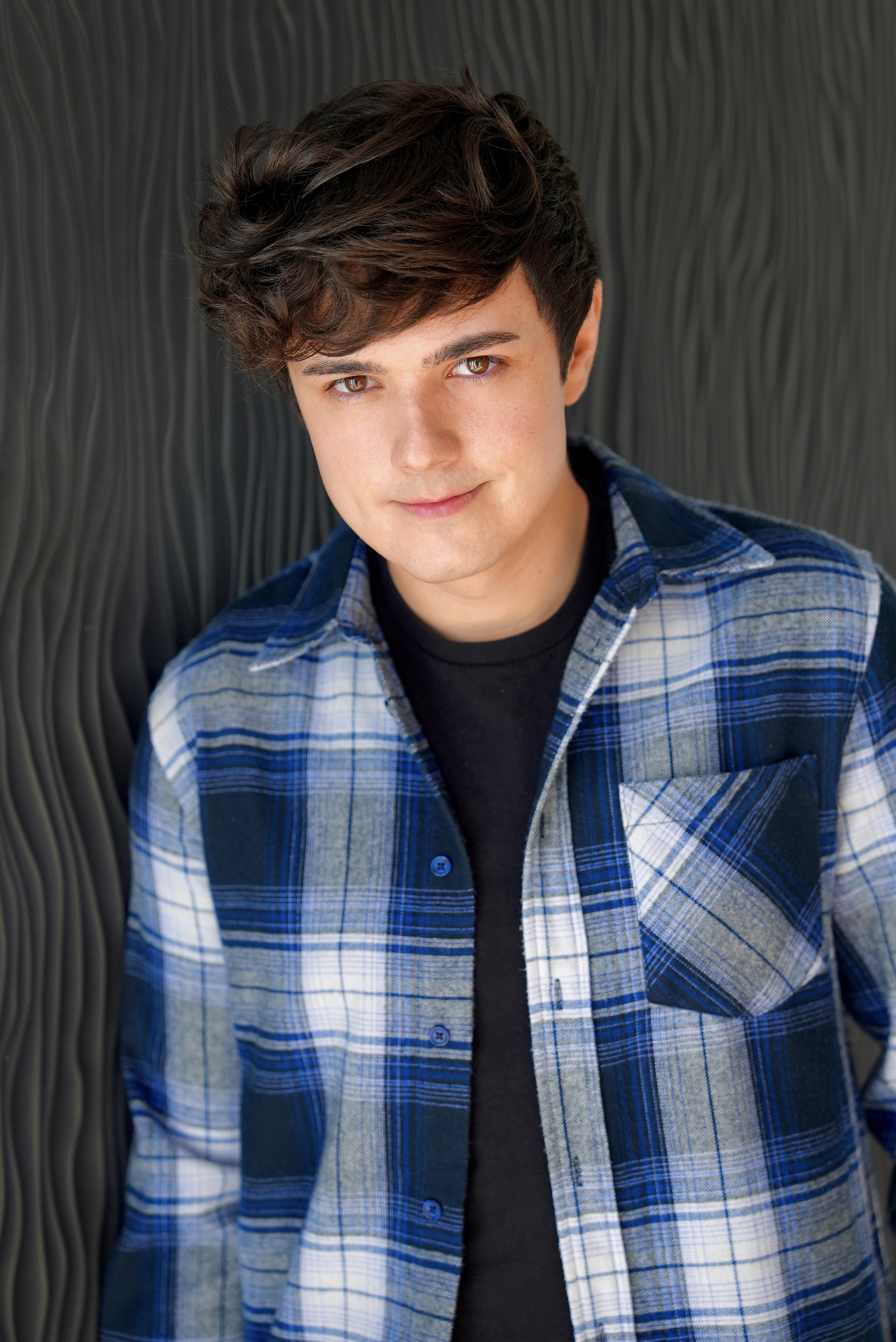
- Aguilar in 2023
- Born: Zachary Aguilar; February 21, 1998 (age 28)
- Occupation: Voice actor
- Years active: 2014–present
- Agent: Dean Panaro Talent
- Notable work: Demon Slayer: Kimetsu no Yaiba as Tanjiro Kamado; JoJo's Bizarre Adventure: Diamond Is Unbreakable as Koichi Hirose; Cyberpunk: Edgerunners as David Martinez; One Punch Man as Genos; Fire Emblem: Three Houses as Byleth (Male); Genshin Impact as Male Traveler (Aether)

Zachary Aguilar (born February 21, 1998) is an American voice actor who has appeared in various English dubbed versions of Japanese anime and video games. Aguilar's first major role was Genos in One Punch Man, and has since appeared as Tanjiro Kamado in Demon Slayer: Kimetsu no Yaiba, Koichi Hirose in JoJo's Bizarre Adventure: Diamond Is Unbreakable, Genos in One Punch Man, Arthur Pendragon in The Seven Deadly Sins and David Martinez in Cyberpunk: Edgerunners, which won Best Voice Artist Performance (English) at the 7th Crunchyroll Anime Awards, the first member of Generation Z to do so.

He is also known for his roles in video games, such as Byleth Eisner in Fire Emblem: Three Houses, Aether in Genshin Impact, Espresso Cookie in Cookie Run: Kingdom, Campanella in The Legend of Heroes: Trails of Cold Steel IV, and Calem in Pokémon Masters.

== Filmography ==
=== Anime films and television ===
Year	Title	Role	Notes	Ref.
2015	Sword Art Online	Talken		
2015–2021	The Seven Deadly Sins	Arthur Pendragon		
2015	Aldnoah.Zero	Slaine Troyard		
2016	Hunter × Hunter	Colt		
2016	Mobile Suit Gundam: Iron-Blooded Orphans	Takaki Uno		
2016	Charlotte	Takato		
2016–present	One-Punch Man	Genos		
2017–2019	March Comes In like a Lion	Harunobu Nikaidō		
2017	Skip Beat!	Corn		
2017	Fate/Apocrypha	Sieg		
2018–2019	JoJo's Bizarre Adventure	Koichi Hirose		
2018	Katsugeki/Touken Ranbu	Horikawa Kunihiro		
2018	Kakegurui – Compulsive Gambler	Rin Obami, Horo Jomaru		
2018	Saint Seiya: The Lost Canvas	Salo		
2018−present	Re:Zero − Starting Life in Another World	Otto Suwen		
2018	Sword Gai	Marcus Lithos		
2018	Back Street Girls	Kazuhiko Sugihara		
2019	Carole & Tuesday	Roddy		
2019	The Disastrous Life of Saiki K.: Reawakened	Shun Kaido		
2019–present	Demon Slayer: Kimetsu no Yaiba	Tanjiro Kamado	Lead role	
2020–2022	Yashahime: Princess Half-Demon	Riku		
2020–2023	Fly Me to the Moon	Nasa Yuzaki	Lead role	
2021	Scarlet Nexus	Luka Travers		
2021	Demon Slayer: Kimetsu no Yaiba – The Movie: Mugen Train	Tanjiro Kamado	Lead role	
2021	2.43: Seiin High School Boys Volleyball Team	Kimichika Haijima		
2022	Bubble	Hibiki	Lead role	
2022	The Prince of Tennis II U-17 World Cup	Aporon Stephanopoulos, Orion Stephanopoulos, Papadopoulos Evangelos, Thalatta Hercules, Hermes Kounellis, Vulcan Laertius, Zeus Iliopoulos		
2022	Dragon Ball Super: Super Hero	Dr. Hedo		
2022	Cyberpunk: Edgerunners	David Martinez	Lead role	
2023	The Legend of Heroes: Trails of Cold Steel – Northern War	Campanella		
2024–2025	The Seven Deadly Sins: Four Knights of the Apocalypse	Arthur Pendragon		
2025	Blue Box	Taiki Inomata	Lead role	
2025	Miraculous World: Tokyo, Stellar Force	Kazuno (a.k.a. Capricorn)		

=== Video games ===
Year	Title	Role	Notes	Ref.
2019	Judgment	Additional voices	English dub	
2019	Fire Emblem Heroes	Byleth (Male)	English dub	
2019	Fire Emblem: Three Houses	Byleth (Male)	English dub, replaced Chris Niosi	
2019	AI: The Somnium Files	Ota Matsushita	English dub	
2019	Pokémon Masters	Calem	English dub	
2020	Super Smash Bros. Ultimate	Byleth (Male)	English dub, DLC	
2020	13 Sentinels: Aegis Rim	Keitaro Miura	English dub	
2020	Genshin Impact	Traveler (male; Aether), Moon Carver (Houzhang)	English dub	
2020	Yakuza: Like a Dragon	Sota Kume, additional voices	English dub	
2021	Persona 5 Strikers	Ango Natsume	English dub	
2021	Nier Replicant ver.1.22474487139...	Player: First Half	English dub	
2021	Scarlet Nexus	Luka Travers	English dub	
2021	Akiba's Trip: Hellbound & Debriefed	Additional voices	English dub	
2021	Shadowverse: Champion's Battle	Hero (male)	English dub	
2021	Tales of Arise	Ganye, additional voices	English dub	
2021	Lost Judgment	Kento Amasawa, Doumu Okitegawa	English dub	
2021	Cookie Run: Kingdom	Espresso Cookie	English dub	
2021	Demon Slayer: The Hinokami Chronicles	Tanjiro Kamado	English dub	
2022	Relayer	Pluto, additional voices	English dub	
2022	AI: The Somnium Files – Nirvana Initiative	Ota Matsushita	English dub	
2022	Fire Emblem Warriors: Three Hopes	Byleth (Male)	English dub	
2022	Soul Hackers 2	Arrow	English dub	
2023	Fire Emblem Engage	Byleth	English dub	
2023	Octopath Traveler II	Additional voices	English dub	
2023	Like a Dragon Gaiden: The Man Who Erased His Name	Sakuma	English dub	
2024	Like a Dragon: Infinite Wealth	Additional voices	English dub	
2024	Granblue Fantasy: Relink	Additional voices	English dub	
2024	Persona 3 Reload	Additional voices	English dub	
2025	Raidou Remastered: The Mystery of the Soulless Army	Sadakichi Kohno	English dub	
2026	Trails in the Sky 2nd Chapter	Campanella	English dub	
2026	Wuthering Waves	David Martinez	English dub, Cyberpunk: Edgerunners collaboration	

== Awards and nominations ==
Year	Award	Category	Work/Recipient	Result	Ref.
2023	7th Crunchyroll Anime Awards	Best Voice Artist Performance (English)	David (Cyberpunk: Edgerunners)	Won	
