= Claude von Riegan =

Fire Emblem: Three Houses character

- Fire Emblem character
- Claude in Fire Emblem: Three Houses
- First game: Fire Emblem: Three Houses (2019)
- Designed by: Chinatsu Kurahana
- Voiced by: EN: Joe Zieja; JP: Toshiyuki Toyonaga

In-universe information
- Affiliation: Golden Deer
- Weapon: Bow and arrow

Claude von Riegan (Japanese: クロード＝フォン＝リーガン, Hepburn: Kurōdo fon Rīgan) is one of the main characters in Fire Emblem: Three Houses (2019) and its spin-off Fire Emblem Warriors: Three Hopes (2022), both of which are part of Nintendo's tactical role-playing video game franchise Fire Emblem. He is the heir of the Leicester Alliance and the leader of the Golden Deer at Garreg Mach Monastery, alongside Edelgard von Hresvelg of the Black Eagles and Dimitri Alexandre Blaiddyd of the Blue Lions. His house is one of the houses that the protagonist, Byleth Eisner, can serve as a professor to.

While Claude is known to be an outgoing and laid-back individual, he is also known to be a remarkable cunning and genius strategist with a strong motive to open the borders of Fódlan to other nations such as Almyra, a rivaling kingdom that has conflict with the Leicester Alliance. It is later revealed that he's half-Almyrian, as he is actually Prince Khalid (カリード, Karīdo), the son of the King of Almyra and Queen Tiana, the daughter of Duke Oswald von Riegan.

If the player decides to support the Golden Deer House at the beginning of the games, then Claude will become the main protagonist of his routes. If not, he will serve as either an ally or enemy depending on the routes that the player chooses to follow.

Following his appearance, Claude had received a positive reception from fans and critics alike, with many praising the vocal performances by Zieja and Toyonaga respectively, his laidback yet cunning nature, and his ideals for Fódlan. He has also been a subject of commentary when it comes to his sexuality, which has received a mixed reception.

== Appearances ==
Claude is a playable character in the video game Fire Emblem: Three Houses. His height is 175 cm and his birthday is on July 24. He, like multiple other characters in the game, has a Crest, an artifact inside of him that gives him powers beyond that of a normal human. He is the heir to the House of Riegan, the leading house of the Leicester Alliance, a territory in Fodlan. His birth name is Khalid, and he was the child of the king of Almyra and the daughter of Duke Riegan, facing discrimination for his mixed heritage both in Almyra and the Leicester Alliance. This caused him to become invested in ending Fodlan's isolation. He also changed his name to Claude to hide his lineage. He later enrolled at the age of 17 at the Officers Academy in Garreg Mach Monastery, operated by the Church of Seiros and Archbishop Rhea, serving as the house leader of the Golden Deer. He is able to have dialogue with certain characters both in and out of the Golden Deer, including the protagonist, Byleth, whom he can enter into a romance with if the character is female and serves as the professor of the Golden Deer. He is accompanied by Edelgard von Hresvelg, the leader of the Black Eagles, and Dimitri Alexandre Blaiddyd, the leader of the Blue Lions, hailing from the Adrestian Empire and the Kingdom of Faerghus respectively. If Byleth teaches the Golden Deer, Claude becomes intrigued in them due to Rhea's interest in Byleth as well as Byleth wielding the Crest of Flames and the Sword of the Creator. After learning more about Byleth, Claude vows to help them learn more about their origin and the Church. Eventually, Edelgard declares war on the Church of Seiros. If Byleth joined the Golden Deer, they become Claude's ally in this war, who allies himself with Dimitri in each route. If Byleth chose to ally with Edelgard, they will have to do battle against Claude.

Byleth is put into stasis following Edelgard's declaration of war, leaving Claude, Dimitri, and Edelgard to wage war, with each of them assuming control of their respective territory. When Byleth reawakens five years later, they reunite with Claude, who is now around 22 years old, and who secures Byleth's alliance by reiterating his promise to help Byleth learn the truth. Together, they manage to unite the Leicester Alliance and defeat Edelgard, with Byleth killing her. The war turned to Those Who Slither in the Dark, the group enabling Edelgard's war, doing battle with Nemesis, resurrected by Those Who Slither in the Dark to wage war on Fodlan. After killing Nemesis, Byleth and Claude vow to bring about peace, with Claude returning to Almyra to create ties between it and Fodlan.

Claude was featured as part of a line of plush toys, including Byleth, Edelgard, Dimitri, and Roy.

== Concept and creation ==
Claude von Riegan was created for Fire Emblem: Three Houses, and is one of the three characters with whom the protagonist Byleth can choose to ally. He is a member of the Golden Deer house, and becomes the leader of the Leicester Alliance. The team designing him was inspired by multiple characters, including Yang Wen-li from The Legend of the Galactic Heroes and Rajendra from The Heroic Legend of Arsland, being described as a mixture of the two characters. While he goes by Claude, his real name is Khalid. This was intended to be revealed in the game's story, but they couldn't find the opportunity to fit it in, nor could they figure out how to make it work. There was also dispute over naming him Claude due to the name having been used for a character in the video game Fire Emblem: Genealogy of the Holy War, but they decided it was fine due to it being a fake name and other characters in the series having shared names in the past. When discussing the theme of his story, producer Toshiyuki Kusakihara described it as being about fighting against those who are unwilling to accept people who are different from them, which they noted derived from his upbringing.

Claude is voiced in English by Joe Zieja, who said that he was intrigued by the fact that Claude, despite being in a military academy, was still "chill". Zieja appreciated being able to play a laid back and snarky character in a story that is "very anime influenced where everything is always super intense". He spoke of not knowing the significance of Claude's role in the plot until after he began recording lines. He also was reminded of his own time in a military academy, stating that Claude's approach was the opposite of his own. He talked about how Claude's easygoing nature was refreshing, saying that he learned "you can't let everything get to you". His manager informed him that Claude was a particularly popular character in the Three Houses fandom, showing him fanart and tweets, some from people who were attracted to Claude.

== Reception ==
Claude is a popular character among Three Houses fans, particularly becoming the subject of a series of memes. Kotaku writer Gita Jackson exclaimed that they became interested in Claude after seeing his design and hearing his voice in trailers, and decided to marry him in Three Houses once they started playing the game. They cited his lackadaisical approach to things and the "slightly sarcastic tone of his voice" for what made them so intrigued. Polygon writer Palmer Haasch expressed having strong feelings for Claude in the website's ranking of Three Houses romances, commenting that while the Internet made him out to be a "meme lord", he was "just the only house leader without a stick up his ass". The Mary Sue writer Madeline Carpou regarded him as one of the hottest video game men, calling him "charismatic" and "handsome". She argued that, while his route may be shallow, it didn't make his character shallow, praising him for the depth of his character. The Gamer writer Stephanie Minor, while discussing which of the three house leaders' philosophy was most justified, felt that Claude's perspective was more neutral than the others, despite him still caring about all that's wrong in the world. She argued that he was similar to Edelgard in how he opposed "blind faith", but differed in that he disagreed with declaring war on the Church. She further argued that his goal was to educate the populace, believing that doing so would help ease hatred between different peoples. She believed that, while his goals were admirable, this was an unrealistic solution to Fodlan's ills, believing that real-world bigotry demonstrates that people aren't hateful and bigoted merely because they are ignorant. She believed that all three philosophies would realistically cause the same problems to repeat themselves.

Claude's sexuality and his relationships with other characters, both canon and non-canon, have been the subject of commentary. Paste writer Substitute Thapliyal noted that there was anger among fans over perceived queerbaiting of Claude. Thapliyal speculated that this anger was due in part to the series' history of barring same-sex characters from the max-rank "S-rank" even if the characters' relationship was implied to be homoerotic. Fanbyte writer Kenneth Shepard criticized Claude's writing, suggesting that designer Intelligent Systems' handling was both queerbaiting and bad writing. He felt that the writer for Claude could not have intended for him to be straight, noting that despite how Intelligent Systems seems to want to design him, he was critical of the game for having no distinction between how he reacts to a male or female main character. He felt that Claude's dialogue, which he noted was the same regardless of gender, was flirtatious, particularly citing a scene where Claude dances with Byleth. The fact that he could not have Byleth romance Claude was inconsistent with how he was written. Writers Rebecca Katherine Britt and Ps Berge believed that Claude had queercoded dialogue due to flirty scenes with male Byleth despite having non-romantic endings. They argued that the game engaged in queerbaiting in general, claiming that same-sex endings had a tendency to use vague terms like "settling down" and "traveling the world together". They also discussed the non-canon ship between Claude and Sylvain, discussing it as an example of a ship with characters with minimal interaction between one another that is largely speculative. While arguing that it was the least popular ship of the ones they analyzed, it "demonstrated the most significant evolution of a slash-ship over time". Claude's voice actor, Joe Zieja, has discussed the "queering of Claude". The Mary Sue writer Princess Weekes stated that Claude was among the most popular characters to incorporate in ships, alongside Byleth, Edelgard, Dimitri, and Felix. She believed that Claude should have been bisexual, appreciating that fanfiction exists to facilitate that. Gayming Mag writer Mahin Kesore begrudged what he considered to be queerbaiting with Claude, feeling that the lack of male/male relationship options made him feel like the game wasn't made for people like him.
