= Dimitri Alexandre Blaiddyd =

Fire Emblem: Three Houses character

- Fire Emblem character
- Dimitri in Fire Emblem: Three Houses
- First game: Fire Emblem: Three Houses (2019)
- Designed by: Chinatsu Kurahana
- Voiced by: EN: Chris Hackney; JP: Kaito Ishikawa

In-universe information
- Affiliation: Blue Lions
- Weapon: Lance

Dimitri Alexandre Blaiddyd (Japanese: ディミトリ＝アレクサンドル＝ブレーダッド, Hepburn: Dimitori Arekusandoru Burēdaddo) is one of the main characters in Fire Emblem: Three Houses (2019) and its spin-off Fire Emblem Warriors: Three Hopes (2022), both of which are part of Nintendo's tactical role-playing video game franchise Fire Emblem. He is the leader of the Blue Lions House at Garreg Mach Monastery and the prince of the Holy Kingdom of Faerghus, alongside Edelgard von Hresvelg of the Black Eagles and Claude von Riegan of the Golden Deer. His house is one of the houses the protagonist, Byleth, can serve as a professor to, and is accompanied by multiple other students, including Dedue Molinaro and Felix Hugo Fraldarius.

Dimitri appears to be an honorable, idealistic, and kind man who values the ideals of nobility, but beneath his noble persona lies a violent and ruthless nature, as well as trauma caused by an event that has haunted him since childhood. Since then, he's been hunting down the people who he believes were responsible for the event that has plagued him for years. Following the five-year time skip, during the War of Fódlan, Dimitri's sanity has been severely reduced to that of a vengeful and sadistic individual who has little regard for anyone's life, including his own. If the player supports him, he will become the main protagonist of his route, and as the story goes on, his sanity will be restored. However, if the player opposes him and joins Edelgard, he will become one of the main antagonists of the Empire routes in the games.

He has received a positive reception from fans and critics alike, with many praising the vocal performances by Hackney and Ishikawa respectively, and his character development in the Azure Moon and Azure Gleam routes in Three Houses and Three Hopes respectively, as well as for his kindness, strength, and vulnerability that he displays and the handling of his mental trauma and sanity.

== Appearances ==
Dimitri is a playable character in the video game Fire Emblem: Three Houses. He, like multiple other characters in the game, has a Crest, an artifact inside of him that gives him powers beyond that of a normal human. Dimitri is the prince of the kingdom of Faerghus, one of multiple territories in Fodlan, and the only survivor of the Tragedy of Duscur, which saw his family killed. Dimitri later becomes the leader of the Blue Lions, accompanied by Edelgard von Hresvelg, the leader of the Black Eagles, and Claude von Riegan, the leader of the Golden Deer, hailing from the Adrestian Empire and the Leicester Alliance respectively. If the player chooses to lead the Blue Lions, they will be made to follow Dimitri's route. Byleth and Dimitri face multiple obstacles through their schooling, including hostilities from a group called Those Who Slither in the Dark and a figure called the Flame Emperor, whom they discover is Edelgard plotting to take over Fodlan and destroy the Church and Crest system. This causes him to go mad, vowing to execute Edelgard under the belief that she was responsible for the Tragedy.

During the battle, Byleth and Dimitri are separated, with Byleth being put into stasis for five years. While Byleth is in stasis, Dimitri is branded a traitor and imprisoned for regicide, only to be freed by Dedue. When Byleth returns, they find Dimitri suffering from the trauma five years past, and the two reunite the Blue Lions to reclaim the Monastery. He eventually reawakens to his conscious, and assists the Alliance in its defense against Edelgard. He eventually defeats Edelgard in combat after failing to find a compromise to end the war. If the player chooses to side with Edelgard and the Black Eagles, Dimitri serves as a supporting antagonist alongside Rhea, ultimately dying in battle.

Dimitri appeared in Fire Emblem Heroes as a Legendary Hero, types of Heroes that can only be summoned in certain in-game events. A summer-themed version of Dimitri was added to Heroes as well. Dimitri is playable in the 2025 mobile game Fire Emblem Shadows.

Dimitri was featured as part of a line of plush toys, including Byleth, Edelgard, Claude, and Roy.

== Concept and creation ==
Dimitri was created by Chinatsu Kurahana for Three Houses. When designing the characters' aged-up versions following the time skip, Three Houses director Toshiyuki Kusakihara intended for the experience of the past five years to be reflected in their appearance. He noted that he gave Dimitri an eyepatch in his story route but not the other characters' routes to reflect that he went through more hardships during his route than others. Dimitri is voiced in English by Chris Hackney, who described himself as falling in love with the character after reading the script. Hackney recalled experiencing "unexpected emotional turmoil" while recording some scenes, such that he would occasionally cry while recording or take 15-minute breaks after particularly emotional scenes.

== Reception ==
Dimitri has received generally positive reception. Nintendo Dream staff identified him as having strength, kindness, and vulnerability, which made him a lovable character. They noted that Dimitri was the number one Three Houses character in their survey. Polygon writer Patricia Hernandez discussed the brutalities surrounding the game's five-year time skip, specifically how it impacted Dimitri. She noted how he came out of it with a "shockingly idealistic attitude" where he trains to become strong enough to help others, though she noted that there were "easy-to-miss" moments before the time skip, such as discussions of apparent enjoyment of killing. Hernandez wanted to believe Dimitri was a good person, but realized how traumatized and damaged he was by his family's murder when Edelgard's plot is revealed. She also felt that his change in appearance reflected his direction as a character, adding that his descent was "astonishing" to see in a video game. EGM Now writer Malindy Hetfeld discussed the similar trauma held by Dimitri and Edelgard over the destruction of their families, arguing that while Dimitri's trauma is more obvious, declaring war on an entire continent over their trauma is not the "level-headed option". The Mary Sue writer Madeline Carpou regarded Dimitri as one of the hottest video game men, believing that he was a contributing factor to why many newcomers to Fire Emblem got into Three Houses. Carpou also appreciated the addition of a support conversation between Dimitri and Bernadetta von Varley in Three Hopes, finding that the repetition of him trying to get Bernadetta to open up may be unenjoyable to some, but not to her.

Dimitri's route, particularly in relation to the other routes in the game, was the subject of critical commentary. When discussing the superior route to take in Three Houses, Siliconera writer Lucas White argued that Edelgard's was superior to the other routes, Dimitri's included. He called Dimitri's route the "neoliberal" option, stating that he took over the system to introduce "gradual progress". He felt that each route presented their ideology and leader in its best light, explaining that Byleth's involvement both helps implement their ideology while also helping them cope with their trauma, such as teaching Dimitri to abandon his vengeance. The Gamer writer Stephanie Minor discussed Dimitri, Edelgard, and Claude's routes, particularly which route's philosophy was the most justified. Minor felt that, while Dimitri's criticisms that Edelgard was taking away people's faith and would thus leave them confused instead of being able to enjoy a better world were correct, he did not offer up a viable alternative. She compared his methods to Claude's, namely his desire to educate the masses and help them become strong, arguing that Fodlan would not be where it is if this worked. She came to the conclusion that all three leaders' routes were doomed to fail. Fellow The Gamer writer Jessica Ramey, while stating that she was not arguing in favor of another route, argued that Dimitri's route is the bad ending of Three Houses. She felt that his route's ending fails to make any changes that would address the factors that led to war in the first place, noting how this route has the Agarthans survive the conflict. She felt that it wasn't necessarily bad writing to have this happen, as it may have complicated his arc of discarding vengeance, but still felt that they could have done it as a post-game story segment like it was done in Edelgard's route. She appreciated that the Ashen Wolves downloadable content added a new paired ending between Dimitri and Hapi where he learns about what the Agarthans did to her, leading him to defeat the Agarthans. She also felt that Dimitri's endings fail to address what she considers a toxic military culture of discarding their families and lives in service to military.

Game Revolution writer Jason Faulkner felt that the relationship between Dimitri and Dedue was "incredibly complex" due to the troubled history between Dimitri and Dedue's people. Paste writer Substitute Thapliyal suggested that the relationship between Dimitri and Dedue could be read as "explicitly queer". Dimitri is among the most common character shipped with another character in Three Houses fanfiction, particularly in one ship with female Byleth, the second-most popular ship in the fandom. The Mary Sue writer Princess Weekes hypothesized that part of why he's so popular is because he suffered trauma and writers wanted to write stories about him being comforted.
