= Edelgard von Hresvelg =

Video game character

- Fire Emblem character
- Edelgard as depicted in Fire Emblem Heroes
- First game: Fire Emblem: Three Houses (2019)
- Designed by: Chinatsu Kurahana
- Voiced by: English: Tara Platt; Japanese: Ai Kakuma

In-universe information
- Weapon: Swords, axes
- Origin: Adrestian Empire

Edelgard von Hresvelg (Japanese: エーデルガルト＝フォン＝フレスベルグ, Hepburn: Ēderugaruto fon Furesuberugu) is one of the main characters in Fire Emblem: Three Houses (2019) and later on its spin-off Fire Emblem Warriors: Three Hopes (2022), both of which are part of Nintendo's tactical role-playing video game franchise Fire Emblem. She is the heir to the once-mighty Adrestian Empire and the leader of the Black Eagles, one of the three main student houses of Garreg Mach Monastery.

While she begins as an ally and later student of Byleth, the game's protagonist, a mid-game plot twist reveals her to be the enigmatic Flame Emperor (炎帝, Entei), a guise under which she plots to overthrow the Church of Seiros and conquer the other nations of Fódlan to create a society in which Crests — hereditary birth marks demonstrating noble blood and unique potential — hold no sway over social status. In order to achieve this, she is willing to wage war against the Church and ally with the mysterious faction known as Those Who Slither in the Dark to achieve her ambitions.

If the player chooses to teach the Black Eagles House at the start of the game and meets certain other requirements, they are given the choice of joining her cause, which leads to her becoming the main protagonist of her routes; in all other scenarios where the player opposes her, she becomes one of the games' main antagonists.

Edelgard has been noted as one of the most popular characters in Three Houses, and praised by critics for her characterization, although aspects of her portrayal, such as her instigation of the war that drives the latter half of each story path, have been criticized. Her story path, Crimson Flower, has also been praised and called realistic for its grey morality, though some have criticized its short length and rushed presentation compared to the other story paths.

== Design ==
Edelgard possesses long, white hair and lilac eyes. At a certain point, she is revealed to have been experimented on as a child to possess two "Crests", markings passed down through the bloodline that bestows magical powers upon the wielder, in an attempt to create a worthy heir. This turned her hair from brown to white and left her with lasting psychological trauma, which was worsened by the fact that she was the only survivor of ten siblings to be similarly experimented on. Despite already possessing the Minor Crest of Seiros, she was given the Crest of Flames (the "Fire Emblem") by force, drastically shortening her lifespan.

== Appearances ==
Shortly before the release of Three Houses, Edelgard was also added to Fire Emblem Heroes as a New Hero. In February 2020, she received a legendary form in her timeskip attire. In August 2020, she received a Choose Your Legends form, dressing her in her emperor attire from Three Houses. In May 2021, she received a fallen form, reminiscent to her form as Hegemon Edelgard from the Azure Moon route in Three Houses.

Edelgard was later announced to return as one of the main playable characters of Fire Emblem Warriors: Three Hopes, a musou spin-off set in a parallel universe from Three Houses. In this game, she and the others are instead rescued by Shez, a mercenary rival to Byleth, which triggers a series of alternate events to happen from the main game. In this timeline, she instead cuts ties with "those who slither in the dark" rather than work with them and declares war two years later on the Church of Seiros. In Scarlet Blaze and Golden Wildfire, she forms an alliance with Claude to take down the Central Church and Kingdom (though in Golden Wildfire, Claude attempts to take out the Central Church first so they wouldn't need to wipe out the Kingdom). She and Shez ultimately defeat both Rhea and Thales and allow the two to seemingly kill each other. In the Azure Gleam route, Thales uses his dark magic to subdue Edelgard and put her under his control, reducing her power and influence similar to her father. Dimitri allies with Claude and Rhea and manages to kill Thales, but spares Edelgard after seeing how Thales' actions have affected her mental state as he and his allies crush the corrupted Empire.

Edelgard reappeared alongside Dimitri and Claude as an emblem in Fire Emblem Engage, with the three house leaders being featured as the same unit with the same skills. The game randomly selects which one is active at the start of each turn.

Outside of the Fire Emblem series, Edelgard appears in Super Smash Bros. Ultimate, where she is a background character in the Garreg Mach Monastery stage and a spirit, as well as the basis for one of Byleth's alternative costumes. She also appears in a theme for Tetris 99 based on Fire Emblem: Three Houses, as well as in WarioWare: Get It Together!, in a microgame based on Fire Emblem: Three Houses.

In 2020, Good Smile Company released an Edelgard Figma.

== Critical reception ==
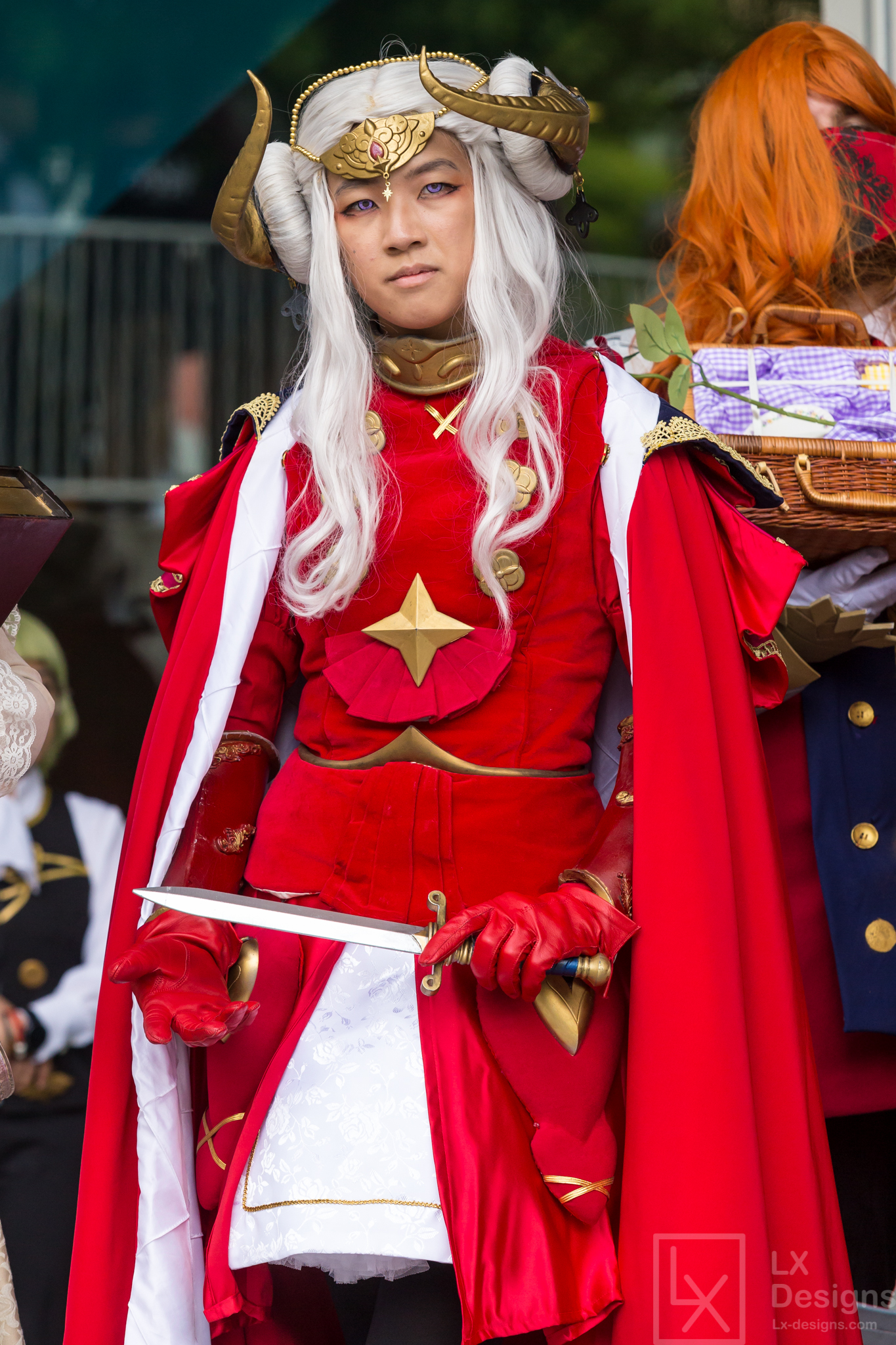
The character has received a huge amount of attention from fans of the game, including cosplay.

Edelgard was noted as being the subject of a "fandom explosion", featuring fan art and cosplay, as well as being the most-deployed character in the game as ranked on its internal leaderboard. Patricia Hernandez of Polygon stated that "much of the fandom in Fire Emblem now revolves around shipping and romance, and it seems as if most people are falling for Edelgard." Over time, however, her ranking was noted to have been supplanted by the character Dorothea.

Daniel Friedman of Polygon stated that "the developers at Intelligent Systems have evidently been reading some George R.R. Martin along with their J.K. Rowling, as there's an unmistakable Daenerys Targaryen vibe to Edelgard," calling her "intense, driven, and willing to pay any price or inflict any cost on others to achieve her goal."

XeeCee of Vice stated that "Edelgard is right about everything," and despite singling out her evil actions as the Flame Emperor, said that "when all was said and done [...] I was comfortable with my choices. For the first time in what feels like a long time, a video game had offered me the chance to play as a medieval revolutionary". Stating that "what makes this entry so different is its commitment to building out a world with believable politics", XeeCee stated that they "joined [Edelgard] immediately" when given the option to turn against the Church, calling her "the avatar of all the class resentments bubbling in Garreg Mach for the first half of the game" and saying that "considering the ills I'd seen throughout the game up to this point, her unmasking as the Flame Emperor wasn't a heel turn, but a call to arms." Lucas White of Siliconera agreed with this, claiming that "supporting Edelgard is the most morally sound choice", and stating that "Edelgard pursues a complete, violent upheaval of everything, literally destroying the Church and reforming the Empire into something new". Despite saying that "Edelgard is no innocent in Three Houses' violent world. She schemes, assassinates, and betrays," he concludes that "her mission is the only one that holds Rhea and her secret society accountable for their actions."

Nathan Lee of RPG Site acknowledged a divide within the fanbase, with many players disliking Edelgard, but called her his favorite Fire Emblem series character and one of the best gaming antagonists. Citing her "noble" reasons for declaring war on the other nations, such as creating a meritocracy within the limited lifespan she has remaining, he contrasted her with most other Fire Emblem villains, who simply sought power for its own sake. Lee cited the lyrics of the game's theme song, The Edge of Dawn, which were presumably written from Edelgard's point of view, noting that they conveyed conflicted emotions and heavy guilt for her actions, as well as a desire to live like a normal person. Lee pointed out that Edelgard also trusts in Byleth a great deal, and is a staunch protector of her allies. While he played devil's advocate by describing Edelgard's flaws, calling her actions driven by cold logic, such as teaming up with Those Who Slither in the Dark, he nonetheless described her as a complex character rather than a "devilspawn".

Stephanie Minor of TheGamer criticized Edelgard's philosophy as the worst of the three main lords, calling her desire to eliminate the strong dominating the weak hypocritical. By forcibly stripping people of their faith in Sothis, she would be similarly as tyrannical as she claims the Church of Seiros is. While stating her opinion that each lord's philosophy is flawed and doomed to fail to change the status quo, she describes Edelgard's as causing the most death in the process, suggesting that Dimitri or Claude's ideals would be most likely to enact positive change.

The optional support and romance between Edelgard and Byleth, the main character, was called a "lovely, touching scene" by Todd Harper of Vice, but also criticized due to the fact that is "90% the same" no matter what gender Byleth is. Harper states that, with regards to female Byleth, "that queer reading that hit me right in the gut emotionally has absolutely, positively no impact whatsoever on the actual story of Three Houses."
