= Byleth (Fire Emblem) =

Video game character

- Fire Emblem character
- The male (left) and female (right) versions of Byleth
- First game: Fire Emblem: Three Houses (2019)
- Designed by: Chinatsu Kurahana
- Voiced by: English: Zach Aguilar (male); Jeannie Tirado (female); Japanese: Yūsuke Kobayashi (male); Shizuka Itō (female)

In-universe information
- Full name: Byleth Eisner
- Nicknames: Ashen Demon; Professor; Emblem of the Academy (Note: As depicted in Fire Emblem Engage (2023).); Ally of the Kingdom Army (Note: As depicted in the Azure Moon path in Fire Emblem: Three Houses.); Commander of the Black Eagle Strike Force (Note: As depicted in the Crimson Flower path in Fire Emblem: Three Houses.); Commander of the Resistance Army (Note: As depicted in the Silver Snow path in Fire Emblem: Three Houses.); Ally of the Alliance Army (Note: As depicted in the Verdant Wind path in Fire Emblem: Three Houses.)
- Species: Human/artificial Nabatean hybrid Emblem (Fire Emblem Engage)
- Gender: Varies (player-determinant)
- Occupation: Mercenary; Professor at Officers Academy
- Affiliation: Church of Seiros; Jeralt's Mercenaries
- Weapon: Sword of the Creator
- Family: Jeralt Eisner (father); Sitri Eisner (mother)

Byleth Eisner (Note: In Japan, male Byleth is spelled as ベレト (Bereto) while female Byleth is spelled as ベレス (Beresu).) is a character in Nintendo's Fire Emblem franchise. They first appeared as the player character and main protagonist of the 2019 video game Fire Emblem: Three Houses, and have since appeared as a playable character in the 2017 and 2018 crossover games Fire Emblem Heroes and Super Smash Bros. Ultimate, being added as DLC in 2019 and 2020 respectively, and as the secondary antagonist in its 2022 spin-off game Fire Emblem Warriors: Three Hopes. In each game, players can choose between a female or male version of the character. (Note: In both Three Houses and Three Hopes, players can also pick the character's name, although Byleth remains their canonical name.) The male version of the character also appears in the 2023 video game Fire Emblem Engage as an Emblem alongside other Fire Emblem protagonists.

Byleth is a wandering mercenary who possesses the mysterious Crest of Flames and can wield the powerful ancient weapon known as the Sword of the Creator. In Three Houses at the age of 21, they receive an offer to serve as a professor at the military academy of Garreg Mach Monastery, acting as the leader of one of its classes. Three Hopes is set in an alternative timeline where Byleth was never a professor at the academy and serves as the arch-rival of a mercenary named Shez, who seeks revenge on Byleth for slaughtering their comrades.

While Byleth is the overall lead character of Three Houses, they tend to become the deuteragonist of the other three routes should they support one of the three house leaders, with the Silver Snow route being the only route where they serve as the main protagonist.

Byleth's first appearance in Three Houses received mixed responses from critics, with criticism directed towards a perceived lackluster of a personality. The decision to add the character to Super Smash Bros. Ultimate was also met with hate from Western fans due to a perceived overabundance of Fire Emblem characters in Super Smash Bros. Despite this, they became one of the most successful characters in the game's competitive scene, after becoming the main character of MkLeo, the number one Ultimate player in the world.

== Appearances ==
=== In Fire Emblem: Three Houses ===
Byleth is the main protagonist of the game, whose name, gender and birthday can be customized by the player. If chosen as male, their height is 175 cm, but if chosen as female, their height is 164 cm. Byleth serves as a professor at Garreg Mach Monastery, and possesses the mysterious Crest of Flames; they can also wield the Sword of the Creator.

Throughout the game, Byleth's only known relative is their father Jeralt Reus Eisner, a renowned mercenary who once served as a Knight of Seiros, before fleeing from Garreg Mach Monastery. It is later revealed that they carry the goddess Sothis within them as a result of Archbishop Rhea's experiments into reawakening her mother. Byleth was the child of Sitri, an artificial "vessel" created to carry the Crest of Flames. While Sitri was unable to unlock its power, she fell in love with Jeralt and had a child. Due to Sitri's inhuman nature, the child, Byleth, was stillborn and had no heartbeat. As a result, Sitri voluntarily gave the child her crest stone to allow them to live at the cost of her own life.

Jeralt, suspicious of Rhea as the cause of Sitri's death, used a fire as cover to escape the monastery, and Byleth grew up under his care, but they still lacked a pulse and emotions, signifying that they were being kept alive by the crest stone. Eventually, Sothis makes herself known to Byleth, albeit in the underdeveloped form of a young girl. When Byleth attempts to sacrifice their life to save Edelgard from bandits, Sothis grants Byleth the ability to use Divine Pulse, a power that can stop and rewind time to a limited extent.

Rhea's attempt to resurrect Sothis ultimately never comes to pass. When the villainous mage Solon traps Byleth in a seemingly inescapable void, Sothis is forced to merge her consciousness with theirs, making them the Enlightened One and causing her to retreat into their subconscious. In most of the game's endings, Byleth retains this divine power and succeeds Rhea as the leader of the Church of Seiros, but in the game's Crimson Flower route, in which Byleth allies with Edelgard against the Church and becomes her confidant, Sothis' crest stone is destroyed, causing Byleth to become mortal. Regardless of the ending, Sothis remains permanently merged with Byleth as a shared consciousness.

Byleth also appears in Fire Emblem Heroes in both genders.

Male Byleth appears in the Fire Emblem Engage microgame in WarioWare: Move It!. He is one of the four emblem characters that appears when the player wins the game.

=== In Fire Emblem Warriors: Three Hopes ===
Byleth reappears as the secondary antagonist in Fire Emblem Warriors: Three Hopes, a Warriors spin-off set in a parallel universe from Three Houses. Like in Three Houses, the player can freely choose Byleth's name and gender. If save data from Three Houses is detected on the player's Nintendo Switch, the default name is the last name used in Three Houses. They are a rival to the main protagonist, Shez, who ends up being the one that attends Garreg Mach and allies with one of the three lords during the war, while Byleth, Jeralt and their band of mercenaries are hired by one of the opposing sides. Shez also carries a being in their conscious named Arval, who was created by Epimenides, an ancestor of Those Who Slither in the Dark, to destroy Sothis. If Shez kills Jeralt, Byleth will allow Sothis to control them to exact vengeance, but Shez kills both of them; however, they feel regret afterwards. If Shez spares Jeralt and Byleth, they will eventually recruit them in their party. This leads to an additional chapter where Epimenides' consciousness takes control of Arval to force Shez into trying to assassinate Byleth, but they are stopped by the lord Shez is allied with. Epimenides then transports Shez and the three lords to a void and attempts to kill them, but they and Byleth work together to destroy him and escape back to their world.

=== In other media ===
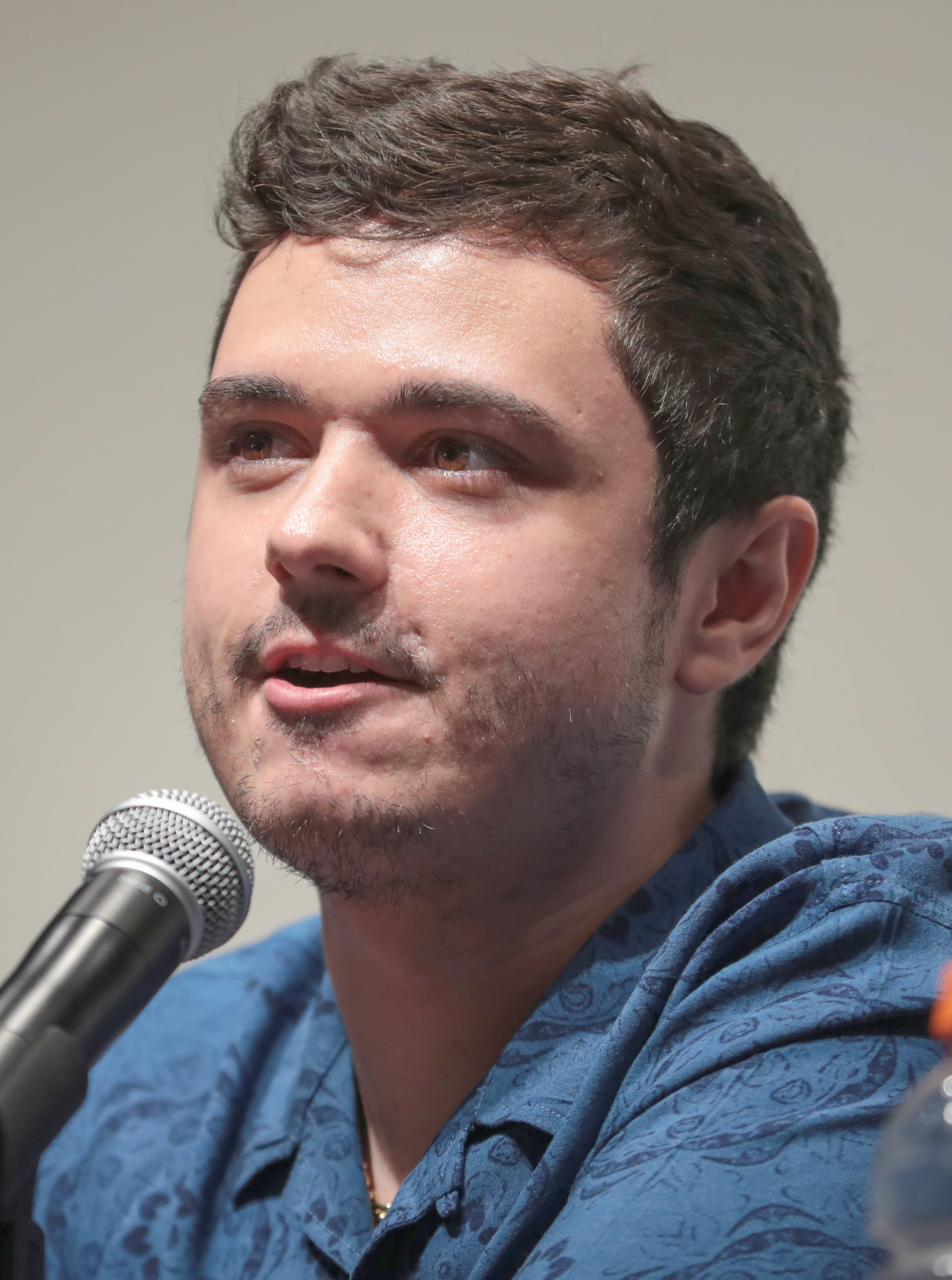
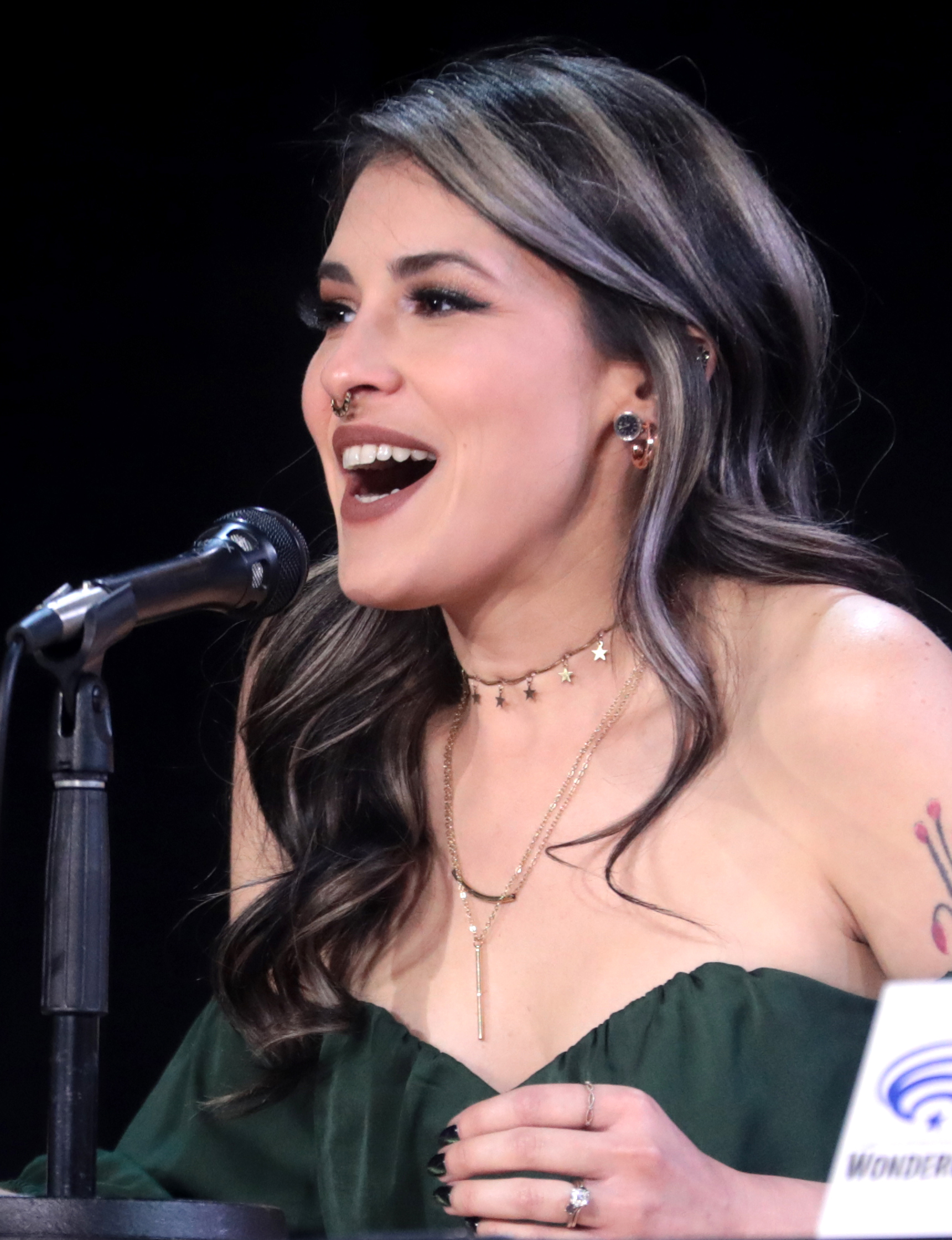
Zach Aguilar (left/top) and Jeannie Tirado (right/bottom) provide the English voices of male and female Byleth, respectively.

Outside of the Fire Emblem series, Byleth is a playable character added as downloadable content for Super Smash Bros. Ultimate, being voiced by Zach Aguilar and Jeannie Tirado in English, and by Yūsuke Kobayashi and Shizuka Itō in Japanese.

An amiibo figure of the male Byleth, based on his appearance in Super Smash Bros. Ultimate, has also been released. In addition, a figure of the female Byleth, distributed by Good Smile Company, was also released.

== Voice actor controversy ==
In July 2019, the former voice actor for male Byleth, Chris Niosi, was removed from his role for violating an NDA and discussing his role prior to the game's launch, as well as potentially due to physical, emotional, and sexual abuse that he admitted to on social media. He was replaced by Zach Aguilar, and his lines were re-recorded.

== Reception ==
=== Fire Emblem: Three Houses ===
Byleth has received mixed feedback from critics, with some calling the character lacking in depth. Melanie Zawodniak of Nintendo World Report rated Byleth the worst avatar character in the series, saying that even compared to the other avatars, their lack of customizability "breaks down the illusion that Byleth is a representation of the player". Stating her belief that the "defined" nature of Byleth conflicts with their indeterminate personality, she also criticizes points where the player can only reply with one line of dialogue, noting that not fully voicing Byleth was likely a cost-saving measure. Maddy Myers of Kotaku called it "kind of creepy" how Byleth spied on their students all the time. Hirun Cryer of USgamer remarked that Cindered Shadows, the DLC story of Fire Emblem: Three Houses, "goes a long way toward helping Byleth feel like a real character with a real arc and not just an avatar". Remarking that Byleth felt more like a tool to help the player connect with the game's world during the main storyline, he noted that the plot about Byleth's mother Sitri allowed Byleth to connect emotionally with someone other than Jeralt.

=== Super Smash Bros. Ultimate ===
==== Announcement and release ====
The decision to include Byleth in Super Smash Bros. Ultimate has resulted in some criticism from players. During a June 2021 poll on ResetEra (which took place when the final DLC character had not been revealed), Byleth was voted as the most boring Fighters Pass character in Ultimate with over half of the votes. Ian Walker of Kotaku called the inclusion of Byleth "refreshingly simple", while Tyler Treese of GameRevolution expressed disappointment and called Byleth's addition "boring". Brendan Graeber of IGN called Byleth "A Study in Simplicity", stating that "Byleth has a simple to grasp moveset with some fun small twists that's welcomely easy to learn the ropes with, and their unique approach to directional-based weapons stands out enough to make checking out yet another Fire Emblem hero worth it – even for the skeptics".

Byleth was also met with hate by Western fans, largely due to several other Fire Emblem characters already playable in the base game. Masahiro Sakurai, the creator and director of the Super Smash Bros. series, agreed that "there are too many Fire Emblem characters", but also noted that he did not directly select the DLC fighters. To alleviate criticism of another sword-wielding fighter, Sakurai and the development team designed Byleth to utilize the Sword of the Creator alongside the signature regalia of the three house leaders in Fire Emblem: Three Houses: Failnaught (Claude's bow), Areadbhar (Dimitri's lance), and Aymr (Edelgard's axe).

==== Competitive scene ====
Original reception for Byleth in the Super Smash Bros. Ultimate competitive scene was mixed; Inverse commented shortly before the character's release that "it's not looking good for the Fire Emblem: Three Houses protagonist". Despite these early criticisms, Byleth would be picked up by MkLeo, the number one Ultimate player in the world; he first used the character during Grand Finals of the major tournament Frostbite in February 2020, winning the tournament.
