= Fire Emblem: Three Houses =

2019 video game

- Icon artwork, featuring both gendered versions of Byleth (bottom) and the three house leaders: Dimitri (left), Claude (top), and Edelgard (right)
- Developers: Intelligent Systems; Kou Shibusawa
- Publisher: Nintendo
- Directors: Toshiyuki Kusakihara; Genki Yokota
- Producers: Masahiro Higuchi; Hitoshi Yamagami
- Designer: Naoko Horie
- Programmers: Satoshi Ubutaka; Atsushi Ota
- Artists: Chinatsu Kurahana; Mao Yamanaka
- Writers: Yuki Ikeno; Ryohei Hayashi; Mari Okamoto
- Composers: Takeru Kanazaki; Hiroki Morishita; Rei Kondoh
- Series: Fire Emblem
- Platform: Nintendo Switch
- Release: July 26, 2019
- Genre: Tactical role-playing
- Mode: Single player

Fire Emblem: Three Houses (Note: Known in Japan as Fire Emblem: Fūkasetsugetsu (Japanese: ファイアーエムブレム 風花雪月, Hepburn: Faiā Emuburemu Fūkasetsugetsu)) is a 2019 tactical role-playing video game developed by Intelligent Systems and Koei Tecmo's Kou Shibusawa and published by Nintendo for the Nintendo Switch. A collaboration between Intelligent Systems and Koei Tecmo, it is the sixteenth entry in the Fire Emblem series and the first for home consoles since Radiant Dawn, originally released in 2007.

Three Houses is set on the continent of Fódlan, divided between three ruling powers currently at peace. These nations are connected through the Garreg Mach Monastery, which houses a church and an officer's school for students from each nation. Taking the role of Byleth, a former mercenary with a mysterious past and the academy's newest professor, the player must choose a class to lead and guide their students through a series of battles and crucial decisions. The game maintains the turn-based tactical gameplay of the previous Fire Emblem titles, while incorporating social simulation and time management elements.

The game's production was challenging for Intelligent Systems, who attributed its success and timely release to Koei Tecmo, who had previously partnered with the company for Warriors. The staff wanted something entirely new for the franchise's debut on high-definition home consoles, birthing the school life mechanics and expansions to battle. Chinatsu Kurahana was the main character designer. The game's school system and a time skip later in the story took inspiration from the fourth installment, Genealogy of the Holy War.

Three Houses was released to critical acclaim. Critics praised the integration of the school system and battalion mechanics, narrative, characters, soundtrack, and replay value. Minor criticisms were directed at the game's easier difficulty compared to past installments as well as some visual and technical problems. As of December 2022, the game has sold 4.12 million copies worldwide, making it the single best-selling game in the franchise. The game would go on to win Best Strategy Game and the inaugural Player's Voice Award at The Game Awards 2019. A Warriors-style spin-off, Three Hopes, was released for the Nintendo Switch on June 24, 2022. Fortune's Weave, a mainline installment set in the same world as Three Houses, was released on September 17, 2026 for the Nintendo Switch 2.

== Gameplay ==
A battle during the first half of Fire Emblem: Three Houses, showing Bernadetta, one of the playable units, about to engage in combat with an enemy unit

Fire Emblem: Three Houses is a tactical role-playing game in which players control a player character whose gender and name are chosen at the beginning of the game. During the opening hours, the player character is asked to teach at the Garreg Mach Monastery, which acts as a hub for game activities. Choosing a particular house to teach impacts the narrative from that point on. The player's time is divided between story-based battles that advance the main narrative, and periods in Garreg Mach where they interact with students and staff members there. While the opening half of the game focuses on this school system, the story skips ahead five years and focuses more on battle, with the player being bound to the house they chose during the opening

During the periods between storyline battles, the player has a set number of days marked on a calendar, which can be used for a variety of activities from teaching classes and field exercises to planting seeds in the greenhouse and fishing in the pond. The player also has free time events, where they can socially interact with students and build up relationships with them. Building a relationship is done through Support actions, with actions and dialogue choices impacting a character's Support level. If the relationship is strong enough, this can lead to the two marrying after a story-based time skip event. By raising particular attributes through actions in battle and within the Monastery, the player can recruit students from other houses, alongside other characters. Each action during the academy section costs a set number of time points, with a limited number of time points available each day and more activities than can be covered by the points available. The player must choose which events to trigger, losing access to others in consequence. Network play and Amiibo functionality are also supported, with network play allowing players to passively visit other players' monasteries online, and compatible Amiibo figures to be scanned for additional materials and bonus music tracks for scanning Fire Emblem-specific Amiibo.

As with other Fire Emblem games, Three Houses uses a turn-based battle system; players take control of a set number of unique units. They move across a grid, transitioning from a top-down perspective to a third-person view when a battle is triggered. A new feature to the series allows player to hire Battalions, additional troops that can support a chosen unit. Battalions have passive abilities which grant character buffs to the lead unit, and can perform special moves called Gambits, which can range from healing multiple units to stunning powerful enemies. Players can also zoom in on the battlefield to assess individual battalions. As with other entries, there is a "Classic" mode where characters who fall in battle are subjected to permanent death, and a "Casual" mode where fallen characters are revived after each battle. After a certain point in the story, players can rewind and undo a set amount of turn actions per battle using the "Divine Pulse" ability.

Every unit is assigned a character class, which can be customized. While characters have starting abilities which naturally grant them a class, they can be taught additional skills which alter their class. Class changes are available upon a student's "certification" during the school segments, with certain prerequisites recommended to have a higher chance at passing the corresponding certification exam. Prior to starting a school week, lesson plans can be put into place to individually manage a unit's growth, build Support between two classmates by engaging them in group assignments, or simply instruct the class automatically with a passive "auto-instruct" feature. Rather than the previously established Weapon Triangle of earlier Fire Emblem games, different units have weapon-based skills called Combat Arts they can be taught during the school segments. Weapons have a set number of uses before they degrade and have their stats reduced. Combat Arts are learned by becoming proficient in a type of weapon; they deal higher damage than standard attacks in exchange for a large chunk of a weapon's durability.

== Plot ==
=== Setting and characters ===
Three Houses takes place on the continent of Fódlan. The landmass is divided into three rival nations who are now at peace: the Adrestian Empire to the south and west, the Holy Kingdom of Faerghus to the north, and the Leicester Alliance to the east. The Church of Seiros, based at Garreg Mach Monastery at the continent's center, is the region's dominant religion and is an influential power in Fódlan in its own right. In ancient history, a war raged between the Church's titular founder Seiros and the "King of Liberation" Nemesis, an era which also saw the establishment of the Empire by Seiros. In the thousand years since then, the Kingdom split away from the Empire, then the Alliance declared its independence from both powers. A prolonged conflict ensued, with the Church being responsible for keeping peace. The nobility of Fódlan frequently bear Crests, sigils passed down through family bloodlines that grant magical powers. Bearing a crest greatly influences dynastic politics, with nobles inheriting Crests valued far above those who lack them. Those who have Crests can also wield powerful artifacts called Hero's Relics. The series's titular "Fire Emblem" appears as the "Crest of Flames", the Crest associated with the progenitor god.

Players take on the role of the main character, called Byleth by default, who can be either male or female. A mercenary by trade, they become enrolled in the Officers Academy of Garreg Mach Monastery as a teacher. During their journey Byleth is aided by Sothis, a strange and initially amnesiac girl who appears in their dreams and can only be heard by them. At Garreg Mach Monastery, Byleth chooses one of the three school houses, each aligned to a different nation of Fódlan. They are the Black Eagles led by Edelgard von Hresvelg, imperial princess and heir to the Adrestian throne; the Blue Lions led by Dimitri Alexandre Blaiddyd, prince of the Kingdom; and the Golden Deer led by Claude von Riegan, heir to the Alliance's leading house. The Monastery's staff includes those who directly work for the Church, some of whom are recruitable by the player. Other characters include Jeralt, Byleth's father, and Rhea, archbishop of the Church.

=== Story ===
One night, Byleth and Jeralt rescue three young nobles, Edelgard, Dimitri, and Claude from bandits, greatly impressing them. During the attack, Byleth is saved by the mysterious Sothis, who remains within them. Jeralt and Byleth are summoned to Garreg Mach Monastery, the home of the Church of Seiros, Fódlan's dominant religion. Jeralt reluctantly rejoins the Church's military arm, the Knights of Seiros, while Byleth is made a professor of the monastery's Officers Academy. Jeralt privately warns Byleth not to trust the Church's archbishop, Rhea. Byleth is then given the choice of leading one of the academy's three houses: the Black Eagles, the Blue Lions, or the Golden Deer, each populated by students from the Empire, Kingdom, and Alliance respectively. Byleth assumes their duties as teacher for their chosen house, training their students and leading them in battles on behalf of the Knights of Seiros. Byleth and their students discover frightening hints on the nature of Relics and Crests, such as a Relic thief transforming into a monster. Various conspiracies meddle with the monastery and plot against the Church: masked warriors called the Flame Emperor and the Death Knight, the Western branch of the Church, and a hostile cult known as "Those Who Slither in the Dark". Byleth thwarts an attempt to steal a powerful Hero's Relic, the Sword of the Creator. Unexpectedly, the Sword activates when Byleth holds it, and Rhea allows them to keep it. Byleth also rescues the sister of Rhea's advisor from the Death Knight and the Flame Emperor.

Jeralt is murdered by an agent of "Those Who Slither in The Dark". Reading Jeralt's diary, Byleth discovers that Jeralt fled from the Church due to his suspicions of Rhea's involvement in Byleth's birth. Sothis is the progenitor god, who was implanted into Byleth by Rhea when they were born in an attempt to resurrect her. Byleth pursues the cultists responsible for Jeralt's death. A magical attack by one of their leaders forces Sothis to merge with Byleth, allowing them to survive and defeat the cult members with a newly empowered Sword of the Creator. Rhea makes a futile attempt to awaken Sothis within Byleth, but the Flame Emperor attacks the ceremony with allies from the Adrestian Empire. The Flame Emperor is revealed to be Edelgard, who like Byleth bears the Crest of Flames; she accuses the Church of being corrupt. If Byleth sides with Edelgard, they help her lead an assault on Garreg Mach. If they side with Rhea, Dimitri, or Claude, then they help in the defense of the monastery; Rhea is also revealed to be a dragon. Regardless of the side chosen, Byleth is knocked unconscious at the end of the battle and wakes up five years later, discovering that Fódlan has plunged into war as the Empire, Kingdom, Alliance, and Church battle each other. The routes then diverge.

Verdant Wind route

Byleth reunites with Claude, and they rally their students and the remnants of the Church to stand against the Empire. Gathering allies and support, Byleth and Claude invade the Empire. As they confront Emperor Edelgard and her forces, a Kingdom army led by Dimitri also arrives, resulting in a massive battle. Edelgard is forced to retreat while Dimitri is killed. Byleth and Claude press on towards a strategic Empire fort, and receive aid from the foreign nation of Almyra. Claude admits he secretly opened relations with Almyra, and announces his desire to open Fódlan's borders to the outside world and end the continent's isolationism. Byleth and Claude attack the Empire capital, where they defeat and kill Edelgard. Byleth and Claude learn "those who slither in the dark" have been manipulating both the current war and the original war a millennium before. Claude's army defeats the cult in their secret underground city Shambhala. Their leader attempts to destroy them with a rain of missiles, but Rhea intercepts the missiles in her dragon form. Meanwhile, Nemesis is awakened from his tomb by the cult; he and his Ten Elites were a band of thieves who took power from Sothis and her dragon kin after they were slain by the cult in the ancient era. This power was the source of the nobility's crests. Byleth and Claude destroy Nemesis and his undead army. In the aftermath, Fódlan is united under Byleth's rule as they and Claude open its borders and start relations with foreign nations.

Azure Moon route

Byleth reunites with Dimitri, who has been ousted from the Kingdom due to a coup from pro-Empire nobles. Dimitri has become bitter, disillusioned, and unstable as he is haunted by visions of his deceased family and driven to kill Edelgard at any cost. Byleth's students and the remnants of the Church ally with Dimitri despite his erratic behavior. Dimitri eventually forces a massive battle between his own army, the Empire, and the Alliance, resulting in heavy losses on all sides. One of Dimitri's trusted vassals sacrifices himself to protect him from an assassin, which combined with Byleth's guidance causes Dimitri to abandon his desire for revenge. After securing his own lands, Dimitri rescues Claude from imperial forces. Claude dissolves the Alliance and cedes its lands to Dimitri before departing Fódlan. Dimitri then marches for the Empire capital itself. Wanting to make peace with Edelgard, Dimitri arranges a meeting with her and suggest they join forces to realize their goals; Edelgard refuses, and intentionally transforms into a monster during their final confrontation. Dimitri is able to defeat Edelgard and once again offers her mercy, but is forced to kill her when she attempts to attack him. In the aftermath, Fódlan is united under the Kingdom with Dimitri as its ruler, and Byleth becomes the new archbishop of the Church after Rhea steps down.

Crimson Flower route

If Byleth sides with Edelgard, they reunite with their students and find that the Kingdom has allied with the Church while the Alliance remains nominally neutral. Edelgard and Byleth attack and seize the Alliance capital and eliminate Claude from the war, either through killing or exiling him. They then advance into the Kingdom, taking a vital fortress. In retribution for Edelgard interfering with their schemes and slaying one of their commanders, "those who slither in the dark" arrange for the fortress to be destroyed. Edelgard keeps the truth a secret and tells the others that the fortress was destroyed by Church weaponry. Edelgard continues to lead her armies to the Kingdom's capital. Dimitri meets Edelgard in battle, but is defeated and killed. The Kingdom army is routed and Rhea withdraws to the Kingdom capital with her Knights. In her madness, Rhea sets fire to the city, forcing Edelgard to attack to put a stop to her. Byleth and Edelgard are able to kill Rhea. Byleth nearly dies, but Sothis's Crest Stone embedded in their heart dissolves, reviving them. In the aftermath, Edelgard unites all of Fódlan under the Empire and abolishes both the Church and the nobility.

Silver Snow route

If Byleth sides against Edelgard, a similar scenario to the Golden Deer route plays out with Byleth allied with Church remnants and the Black Eagle students against the Empire. After defeating Edelgard in the Empire's capital and "those who slither in the dark" in Shambhala, Byleth learns the full truth of their origins from Rhea, and is then forced to defeat her after she unexpectedly goes berserk. Fódlan is subsequently unified under the Church with Byleth as its new leader.

Cindered Shadows

Byleth pursues an intruder into a hidden underground complex called Abyss, discovering a secret house called the Ashen Wolves; originally hidden through a secret truce, mercenaries have begun raiding Abyss. Byleth and the students agree to help defend Abyss. Aelfric, the Church's liaison to Abyss, warns Byleth that factions within the Church would like to see Abyss purged. Aelfric theorizes that the mercenaries are looking for the Chalice of Beginnings, a key object in a ritual attempted during Garreg Mach's early days with the aim of resurrecting Sothis. Aelfric is captured and ransomed for the Chalice, which Rhea reluctantly agrees to hand over believing the ritual lost. The Ashen Wolves also privately admit to Byleth that they are descendants of the four who performed the ritual, ordered by the Church to keep their bloodlines secret. Aelfric is revealed to be the mastermind, capturing the Ashen Wolves and preparing to use the Chalice to resurrect Byleth's mother Sitri, for whom he held a secret love. Byleth rescues the Ashen Wolves, and when he attempts the ritual anyway Aelfric is transformed into a monster and killed. The Ashen Wolves are disbanded and allowed to leave Garreg Mach, with the four members to return to help each other and Byleth if needed.

== Development ==
Following the unexpected success of Fire Emblem Awakening for the Nintendo 3DS—which helped save the series from cancellation after flagging sales of earlier entries—the Fire Emblem series gained renewed commercial value and prompted developer Intelligent Systems and publisher Nintendo to bring the series back to home consoles for the first time since Fire Emblem: Radiant Dawn in 2007. Concept development for Three Houses began in 2015 following the completion of Fire Emblem Fates for the 3DS. The team originally planned for Three Houses to be another 3DS title. This was scrapped when production began on Fire Emblem Echoes: Shadows of Valentia, resulting in Three Houses being briefly put on hold. When the team learned of the Nintendo Switch, they decided to make the game for home consoles. The team wanted the game to be the biggest and best in the series, and due to it being for home consoles they felt they could not make it alone. With this in mind, they decided to bring in help from Koei Tecmo. At this time, Intelligent Systems and Koei Tecmo were collaborating on the spin-off game Fire Emblem Warriors. After consultation, Koei Tecmo's internal team led by Kou Shibusawa was recommended to them. The biggest challenge for the developers was bringing the series to a high-definition console, a first for the series. Koei Tecmo was deeply concerned in this aspect of development. Full production began in 2017 when Shadows of Valentia was finished, with Toshiyuki Kusakihara and Genki Yokota—respective directors for Intelligent Systems and Nintendo EPD— returning to direct the game.

The game's scenario was written by Koei Tecmo's Yuki Ikeno, Ryohei Hayashi and Mari Okamoto. All three previously worked on the scenario for Warriors and were brought onto the development of Three Houses to help assist Intelligent Systems in writing the social segments of the game. The narrative was written in the vein of a dark fantasy, with the mature aspects of the narrative showing through the conflict between the three factions. The first storyline conceived was the Black Eagle House, with Kusakihara and the other scenario writers building and expanding on the world and characters from that starting point. Voice recording took three months; Kusakihara estimated the amount of voice acting for the Japanese version as five times that of Fire Emblem Echoes. Two key parts of the game, the school sections and a time skip late in the story, were directly inspired by the 1996 entry Fire Emblem: Genealogy of the Holy War; the narrative in Three Houses of characters who were friends in their youth coming into conflict during their older years was almost directly lifted from Genealogy of the Holy War. Kusakihara also admitted influence from the Chinese novel Romance of the Three Kingdoms and Koei Tecmo's adaptation of it in the Dynasty Warriors game series; this came about after Intelligent Systems looked at the narrative and world designs used by the Kou Shibusawa unit. The game's chosen subtitle in Japan was "Fūkasetsugetsu", a yojijukugo of the four seasons to represent the narrative's four branching paths. As it translated awkwardly, it was replaced by the subtitle "Three Houses" in English.

While Intelligent Systems staff handled the weapon and world design, freelance illustrators were brought in for other parts. The team wanted a new artistic image for the series. Character designs and illustrations were handled by Chinatsu Kurahana, known for Uta no Prince-sama and Tokyo Twilight Ghost Hunters and who was the main character designer of the game. Kazuma Koda, who had worked on both Bayonetta 2 and Nier: Automata as a concept artist, was contracted to provide concept art for the game. Kurahana was in talks with Intelligent Systems prior to development, and the final decision was made as Kusakihara felt she could best illustrate the "glamorous, aristocratic society" portrayed in the game. Her influence was particularly noted in the hairstyles of characters, which differed from those seen in earlier Fire Emblem leads. The anime cutscenes were directed by Takashi Sano and produced by Sanzigen, noted for their cel-shaded 3D CGI animation. The music was composed by Fates composers Takeru Kanazaki and Hiroki Morishita, and Awakening composer Rei Kondoh.

Kusakihara and Yokota stated in an interview that Three Houses in its released form would have been difficult or impossible to make without Koei Tecmo's help. The directors particularly cited Koei Tecmo's experience developing large-scale battles for their Dynasty Warriors franchise. This experience allowed large numbers of characters to be shown on screen in battles for the first time in the series. While Koei Tecmo helped with much of the technical and programming side, Intelligent Systems still took the lead on design and other core aspects of development. The new school setting allowed the team to considerably expand the series' RPG mechanics beyond the typical tactical battles which had dominated the series up to that point. The social aspects went through multiple unsatisfactory builds before some team members suggested a calendar system and ability points. This version finally satisfied the team.

The Weapon Triangle, a recurring system for most of the series, was discarded due to it being a "stylized" system. The new weapon-based skill system was designed to be more realistic and increase player choice. Due to its status as the first home console entry in twelve years, the team were under pressure to create something new and exciting. This led to the creation of Battalions in battle and the teaching segments. Time limits were suggested by Kusakihara, who was inspired by Nintendo's Pikmin franchise. The skill growth system drew inspiration from Zill O'll, a role-playing series developed by Koei. The team toyed with the idea of including child characters from romantic supports for the story's second half, a feature from Genealogy of the Holy War which they had used extensively in Awakening and Fates. They soon decided against this, opting for a support experience based around character maturation and platonic relationships. While online features such as seen in the "My Castle" feature from Fates were considered, the Monastery was so expansive and its history deep enough that such customization and sharing options would be impractical to implement, so it was left out.

== Release ==
Nintendo first announced that a new mainline Fire Emblem game was in development for the Nintendo Switch in January 2017 during a Nintendo Direct focused on the series, with a projected release date in 2018. More information was revealed during Nintendo's E3 2018 presentation, showing gameplay and even the finalized title. However, it also confirmed that the release date would be pushed back into early 2019. In February 2019, the game was showcased in another Nintendo Direct displaying new gameplay and story details, including a second delay with the game's release date falling on July 26, 2019, and the confirmation of Koei Tecmo as the co-developer. Another story trailer was showcased at the E3 2019 Nintendo Direct presentation with additional gameplay being shown at Nintendo Treehouse Live later in the week.

In July, Nintendo revealed that the game would be receiving an Expansion Pass that would contain downloadable content for the game that would be released from the game's launch until April 2020. The first wave of DLC added a new "Maddening" difficulty mode, made to address concerns about the game's low level of challenge on "Hard" mode, as well as various cosmetic options. It also patched in a new voice actor for Byleth, replacing Chris Niosi with Zach Aguilar following Niosi's admissions of emotional abuse. The admissions included violation of a non-disclosure agreement with Nintendo about his role as Byleth. Later waves of DLC added additional playable characters, additional actions within the monastery, and the Cindered Shadows storyline.

== Reception ==
Reception

Aggregate scores
Aggregator	Score
Metacritic	89/100
OpenCritic	93% recommend 71% recommend(Cindered Shadows) (Note: Based on 15 reviews.)

Review scores
Publication	Score
Easy Allies	8.5/10
Famitsu	37/40
Game Informer	9.5/10
GameRevolution	9/10
GameSpot	9/10
GamesRadar+	5/5
IGN	9.5/10
Nintendo Life	9/10
Nintendo World Report	8/10
The Guardian	4/5
Video Games Chronicle	4/5

Fire Emblem: Three Houses has received "generally favorable" reviews holding an aggregate score of 89/100 on Metacritic, based on 102 reviews. According to the site, it is the fourth highest-scoring Switch game of 2019, and the highest-rated Switch exclusive. Fellow review aggregator OpenCritic assessed that the game received "mighty" approval, being recommended by 93% of critics.

The four reviewers for Japanese gaming magazine Famitsu all gave praise, with one giving it a perfect score of 10 and the others a 9. Eurogamer's Martin Robinson said that it "really is a game of two halves, but they come together to make one incredible whole." Kimberley Wallace, writing for Game Informer, praised the game's ambition and willingness to take risks with the series formula, being surprised by how willing she was to begin a new game after finishing the campaign. Aron Garst of GamesRadar gave Three Houses a perfect score, praising how the game kept him invested in its characters, with his main criticism of the gameplay being its low difficulty.

GameSpot's Kallie Plagge did not like the need for multiple playthroughs to see the entire narrative, but was otherwise enthusiastic about the game's story and gameplay; she called it "the kind of game that's hard to put down, even when it's over". Brendan Graeber of IGN felt that its depth of characters and tactical options more than justified multiple playthroughs, particularly praising its narrative as being superior to that of Fire Emblem Fates. Nintendo World Report's Daan Koopman said that, despite finding the finales of some acts disappointing, the overall narrative and gameplay kept him invested.

The scenario was met with praise, being cited as a mature and ambitious narrative with strong character interactions, with many lauding the difficult choices presented when picking a side in the first half of the campaign. The two interacting gameplay styles were also positively received, with many noting the social elements as a welcome tactical addition. The game's graphics saw a mixed response, with several websites faulting them as low-quality despite strong artistic design. The music and voice acting met with a strong positive response in both versions.

=== Sales ===
Fire Emblem: Three Houses was the best-selling game during its first week on retail sale in Japan, with 143,130 copies being sold. The game was also the best-selling physical game in the United Kingdom that same week, selling twice as much as its second place competitor Wolfenstein: Youngblood. SuperData Research estimated that Three Houses sold 800,000 digital copies through the Nintendo eShop in its launch month of July 2019. In August 2019, the NPD Group shared the ranking of best-selling games for the month of July in the United States, and Fire Emblem: Three Houses was in second place counting only physical sales. As of March 2020, the game has sold 580k copies in Japan and as of December 2022 4.12 million copies worldwide, making it the single best-selling game in the Fire Emblem franchise.

=== Awards ===
The game won the award for "Best Switch Exclusive" and its People's Voice at the IGN Game of the Year Awards 2019, whereas its other nominations were for "Game of the Year" and "Best Strategy/Tactics Game".

Year	Award	Category	Result	Ref.
2019	Game Critics Awards	Best Strategy Game	Nominated	
2019	2019 Golden Joystick Awards	Best Storytelling	Nominated	
2019	2019 Golden Joystick Awards	Nintendo Game of the Year	Nominated	
2019	2019 Golden Joystick Awards	Ultimate Game of the Year	Nominated	
2019	Titanium Awards	Best RPG	Nominated	
2019	The Game Awards 2019	Best Strategy Game	Won	
2019	The Game Awards 2019	Player's Voice Award	Won	
2020	23rd Annual D.I.C.E. Awards	Strategy/Simulation Game of the Year	Won	
2020	NAVGTR Awards	Animation, Artistic	Nominated	
2020	NAVGTR Awards	Costume Design	Nominated	
2020	NAVGTR Awards	Engineering	Nominated	
2020	NAVGTR Awards	Gameplay Design, Franchise	Nominated	
2020	NAVGTR Awards	Game, Strategy	Won	
2020	Famitsu Dengeki Game Awards 2019	Game of the Year	Nominated	
2020	Famitsu Dengeki Game Awards 2019	Best Scenario	Nominated	
2020	Famitsu Dengeki Game Awards 2019	Best RPG	Nominated	
2020	Japan Game Awards	Award for Excellence	Won	

== Legacy ==
Characters from Three Houses were added as playable units in the mobile game Fire Emblem Heroes shortly before the game's release. A costume based on Three Houses was included in the Nintendo Switch port of Tokyo Mirage Sessions ♯FE. Byleth appears as a playable character in the 2018 crossover fighting game Super Smash Bros. Ultimate, being released as downloadable content on January 28, 2020. Both male and female versions of Byleth are present as alternate costumes for the fighter, whose attacks are based around the use of four of the game's weapons. The Byleth DLC also includes Garreg Mach Monastery as a new stage, as well as a selection of eleven music tracks from Three Houses. An Amiibo figure of Byleth was released on March 26, 2021. A Three Houses-inspired tea drinking microgame was included in the 2021 video game WarioWare: Get It Together! for Nintendo Switch.

In February 2022 during a Nintendo Direct presentation, Nintendo announced a spin-off of Three Houses for the Nintendo Switch entitled Fire Emblem Warriors: Three Hopes, a hack and slash game in the style of Koei Tecmo's Dynasty Warriors series and a successor to 2017's Fire Emblem Warriors, which was released on June 24, 2022. It is set in the same universe as Fire Emblem: Three Houses along with the same cast of characters, but features an alternative story where Byleth does not come to teach at the monastery, along with a completely new protagonist and scenarios.

The sequel game Fire Emblem: Fortune's Weave, set in the same universe as Three Houses, released on September 17, 2026.
