= Fire Emblem Warriors: Three Hopes =

2022 video game

- Key artwork featuring various major characters from the game
- Developer: Omega Force
- Publishers: JP: Koei Tecmo; WW: Nintendo
- Director: Hayato Iwata
- Producer: Yosuke Hayashi
- Designer: Kosuke Okamoto
- Artists: Toshiyuki Kusakihara; Chinatsu Kurahana
- Writers: Yuki Ikeno; Mari Okamoto; Ryohei Hayashi; Yuki Harao
- Composers: Hiromu Akaba; Asami Mitake; Ayako Toyoda; Yuki Matsumura
- Series: Fire Emblem; Dynasty Warriors
- Engine: Katana Engine
- Platform: Nintendo Switch
- Release: June 24, 2022
- Genres: Hack and slash, action role-playing
- Modes: Single-player, multiplayer

Fire Emblem Warriors: Three Hopes (Note: Known in Japan as Fire Emblem Musou: Fūkasetsugetsu (Japanese: ファイアーエムブレム無双 風花雪月)) is a 2022 hack and slash action role-playing game developed by Koei Tecmo's Omega Force division, and published by Koei Tecmo in Japan and Nintendo internationally for the Nintendo Switch. A crossover between Koei Tecmo's Dynasty Warriors, and the Fire Emblem series developed by Intelligent Systems, the game is a successor to both Fire Emblem Warriors (2017) and the mainline entry Fire Emblem: Three Houses (2019). Taking place in the land of Fódlan, the story follows mercenary Shez as they seek revenge against Three Houses protagonist Byleth. After joining the military academy of Garreg Mach Monastery, Shez must choose to ally with one of Fódlan's three nations, leading to alternate story paths. Gameplay is carried over from Fire Emblem Warriors, combining the arena-based action combat from Dynasty Warriors with mechanics from Fire Emblem including character classes and social elements.

Production of Three Hopes began following the release of Three Houses, with Warriors staff Hayato Iwata and Yosuke Hayashi returning as director and producer respectively. Three Houses artist Chinatsu Kurahana returned to design the new characters. The game was based around the premise of exploring the themes of Three Houses from an alternate perspective, while creating an accessible gameplay experience that expanded on established Warriors gameplay. Three Hopes received generally favorable reviews. Critics deemed it an improvement over its predecessor and praised its implementation of Warriors gameplay, but criticized its pacing and technical performance. The game shipped over one million copies worldwide by August 2022.

== Gameplay ==
A battle in Fire Emblem Warriors: Three Hopes; mercenary protagonist Shez engages foot soldiers in combat

Fire Emblem Warriors: Three Hopes is a hack and slash action role-playing game in which the player controls a mercenary at the Garreg Mach Monastery, and a party of allies from a chosen faction; the Adrestian Empire, the Holy Kingdom of Faerghus, or the Leicester Alliance. Depending on the faction chosen, a different story will play out. The mercenary's name—Shez by default—and gender can be changed by the player. The game is split between two gameplay modes: combat missions which drive main story and side quests selected from an overworld map, and sections where Shez and other team members can interact with each other and strengthen their bonds. Missions can be completed in either single-player, or through local multiplayer. Missions are split into regional campaigns, with the player able to either conquer all territories within an area, or head straight for the main target. Upon completing a battle and gaining control over a region, the player is awarded with resources, experience points for units, and points which can be used to customise the player's strategy for a region's main fight such as a frontal assault or sabotage to weaken the enemy.

Combat and mission structure is similar to Fire Emblem Warriors (2017), and carries over its basic gameplay design from the wider Dynasty Warriors series. During missions, players take control of selected party members including the protagonist, with battles revolving around hack and slash combat that build up a combo metre and allow the controlled character to raise their "Awakening" metre to trigger a temporary powered-up state. The goal of missions is to either defeat a specific enemy, or gain control of a location. The player can also use a limited fast travel option to reach different parts of a map. In addition to the controlled party member, the player can direct allied army battalions on missions such as attacking strongholds. Instead of paired units as were present in Fire Emblem Warriors, Three Hopes uses a version of Three Houses's "Adjutant" system, with selected player units being assigned support units which provide assistance in combat. Each battle has a rank, with the highest "S" rank unlocking a reward for the player.

Unit strengths and abilities are dictated by their character class, which grow stronger through a dedicated experience system. Once a unit and their associated class are a high enough level, the class can be upgraded using a dedicated tree, with classes having proficiently in different weapons which have different effectiveness against other types governed by the recurring Weapon Triangle mechanic. Classes come with different boosts, such as Pegasus Knights having flight or Swordmaster gaining increased speed. Units gain experience through combat, but can also be levelled up using in-game money. While basic attack options are common to all characters, some units have unique skills and all units have different growth rates when their level rises. They can also learn properties from additional classes such as increased defence. Prior to an in-story time skip, the player has the option of recruiting units from factions outside their chosen one, though after the time skip only select missions provide this as an option.

Between combat missions, the player can explore their camp and spend a limited point resources to talk to units, engage in training missions, and forge or strengthen their weapons and equipment. Units can engage in Support conversations, raising their social bond and strengthening both their statistics and the two units' synergy during combat. The player as Shez can also engage in dedicated side missions, and complete optional activities with other characters to raise their bond and increase the chance of Support conversations. Three Hopes features multiple difficulty levels, alongside two modes dubbed "Casual" and "Classic": in "Classic" mode, most units who fall in battle are subject to permanent death.

== Synopsis ==
=== Setting and characters ===
Fire Emblem Warriors: Three Hopes takes place in the land of Fódlan, the setting of Fire Emblem: Three Houses (2019). Fódlan is divided between three nations; the Adrestian Empire, the Holy Kingdom of Faerghus, and the Leicester Alliance. A central location is the Garreg Mach Monastery, where the Officers Academy is based that the main characters attend. The storyline is based around a divergence in events during the early story of Three Houses, leading Fódlan down an alternate history. Based on an early choice of alliance, the game splits into three narrative paths: "Scarlet Blaze", "Azure Gleam" and "Golden Wildfire".

The main character is a mercenary, named Shez by default, who can be a man or a woman; during the events of the story they come into contact with the three other main characters, heirs to the nations of Fódlan. These are Edelgard von Hresvelg, imperial princess of Adrestia; Dimitri Alexandre Blaiddyd, heir to the Kingdom of Faerghus; and Claude von Riegan, heir to the Leicester Alliance's controlling family. During the story Shez receives guidance from Arval, a being who seems to live within their mind. Byleth, known as a notorious mercenary in their own right and dubbed the "Ashen Demon", acts as a recurring antagonist. The wider cast includes established companions of the three rulers, characters from the Cindered Shadows downloadable content of Three Houses, and characters exclusive to Three Hopes.

=== Plot ===
While on a job Shez is defeated in battle by Byleth, vessel of the progenitor god Sothis, and their father Jeralt; Shez only survives due to the intervention of the mysterious being Arval and swears revenge. Six months later, Shez rescues three nobles from a bandit attack: Edelgard, Dimitri and Claude. As a reward, Archbishop Rhea of the Church of Seiros allows Shez to enroll in the Officer's Academy, an elite military academy for Fódlan's brightest students. Shez and their classmates rescue Monica von Ochs, a former student who was abducted by "Those Who Slither in the Dark", a fanatical cult that seeks to conquer Fódlan. Afterward, the three lords are forced to depart the Academy when crises strike their respective homelands. Edelgard launches a coup to overthrow Thales, the leader of Those Who Slither in the Dark who has taken effective control of the Empire; Dimitri suppresses a coup launched by his uncle and regent Rufus; and Claude defends Leicester's eastern border from an invasion by Shahid, an avaricious prince of the eastern kingdom of Almyra and Claude's half-brother. Shez accompanies their chosen lord and remains in their service for the next two years. All three lords are made the leaders of their respective countries. Two years later, Edelgard declares war on the Church of Seiros, believing it to be corrupt.

Scarlet Blaze Route

Edelgard and her forces claim Garreg Mach for the Empire, forcing the Church of Seiros to seek aid from the Kingdom. The Empire manages to hold back troops from the Kingdom and Alliance to secure key locations in the west and east. Months later, Edelgard and Claude form a pact for the Empire and Alliance to work together to defeat the Kingdom and Church of Seiros. As their forces begin to surround the Kingdom, many Adrestrian territories are suddenly attacked by Those Who Slither in the Dark and a revolt led by the former Duke Aegir. Edelgard's army slays Duke Aegir and contains most of the chaos before advancing back to the Kingdom. While the Empire and Alliance fight the Kingdom and Church of Seiros in the north, Rhea uses a secret passage and leads her soldiers to reclaim Garreg Mach, which is also approached by Thales and Those Who Slither in the Dark. Edelgard's forces manage to hold back both armies until Rhea and Thales seemingly kill each other. With their absences, the influence of the Central Church wanes, and Those Who Slither in the Dark vanish.

There are two endings to this route that are determined by Shez deciding to recruit or kill Jeralt and Byleth. If they kill Jeralt, Byleth joins Claude and encourages him to break the pact with the Empire during the battle with the Kingdom and Church in the north; Claude's forces are defeated in a three-way battle, which causes all three ruling powers of Fódlan to return to war against each other with no end in sight. If they are recruited, Claude maintains the pact, and the Empire and Alliance prepare for their final battle with the Kingdom to bring an end to the war.

Azure Gleam Route

Dimitri chooses to provide asylum to the Church of Seiros and go to war against the Empire. As they attempt to reclaim western territories, they face a revolt from the traitorous former mage to the royal family Cornelia and the western lords. After they defeat her, Cornelia tells Dimitri that his stepmother, Edelgard's mother, was involved in the Tragedy of Duscur and encourages him to seek answers from Edelgard before dying. The Kingdom and the Empire face off in Arianhrod, with the Kingdom emerging victorious. Before Dimitri can kill Edelgard, Thales appears and attacks both of them. Edelgard reveals that he was responsible for the death of Dimitri's father before he uses his magic to subdue and put her under his control. With the Empire becoming more chaotic under Thales and Duke Aegir's leadership, Claude and Dimitri form a partnership so the combined forces of Leicester, Faerghus, and the Church of Seiros can take down Adrestia. After splitting up the Empire's western and eastern forces, Dimitri and his army successfully kill Duke Aegir and Thales and free Edelgard from Thales's mind control. This forces Adrestria back on all fronts and radically transforms the power structure throughout Fódlan as the allied forces press south to crush the Empire for good.

Golden Wildfire Route

Claude initially opposes Edelgard in defense of Leicester. However, an attempt to counter invade the Empire is interrupted when Shahid launches another attack on the Alliance, forcing Claude to break his momentum against Adrestia to repel and kill Shahid. Claude negotiates a ceasefire with Edelgard. Four months later, the Alliance is reformed as the Leicester Federation, with Claude as its first king. Claude, who agrees with Edelgard's belief that Rhea is stagnating Fódlan, sets out to kill Rhea and cripple the Church's military and political power. Claude drives Dimitri to the capital of Faerghus but is forced to back down when Those Who Slither in the Dark incite civil unrest in Leicester. The Empire and Federation defeat the Kingdom and Church in battle, leading Dimitri to abandon the Church to protect Faerghus, allowing Claude and Shez to battle and kill Rhea. With his goal complete, Claude proposes an end to the war, although it is uncertain whether his words will be heeded.

Secret Chapters

In all three routes, Byleth and Jeralt are hired by factions opposed to Shez and hinder them throughout the war. If Shez kills Jeralt in battle, Byleth swears revenge and surrenders their mortal body to Sothis, forcing Shez to kill them. If Shez convinces Byleth and Jeralt to surrender, the two are hired by Shez's faction. Shortly before the final battle, Arval possesses Shez and attempts to kill Byleth. When Shez's allies intervene, Arval banishes them, Edelgard, Dimitri, and Claude to another dimension using the Forbidden Spell of Zahras. Arval is revealed to be the vessel for the soul of Epimenides, a powerful founding member of Those Who Slither in the Dark bent on killing Sothis. Shez and the three lords kill Epimenides and return to their world to continue the war.

== Development and release ==
Production of Three Hopes began following the completion of Fire Emblem: Three Houses in 2019, when Fire Emblem Warriors producer Yosuke Hayashi was approached by publisher Nintendo about making a sequel to Warriors. While provisionally a standalone Warriors 2, the popularity of Three Houses made the developers make the next Warriors title a game set within the world of Fódlan. Hayashi returned as producer alongside Hayato Iwata as director. Production was primarily handled by Koei Tecmo's Omega Force division. After the project was greelit, Hayashi described development as "moving at an incredible pace". While the story and gameplay were relatively easy to develop, the team went through a trial and error period when balancing its action and strategic elements. As most of the staff had also worked on Three Houses, the internal checks were described by Hayashi as "unusually strict".

When the setting of Three Houses was chosen for the new Warriors game, the team wanted to use the setting to tell a new story rather than repeating the original narrative. Rather than a standard "celebratory game" that had character crossovers, the team went in the direction of a serious storyline tying into the themes of choice and conflict over ideals present in Three Houses. Introducing characters from other series was proposed, but eventually shelved in favour of focusing on the established in-universe cast. To differentiate the game from Three Houses, the team decided to frame the narrative as a historical military chronicle, focusing on aspects of the war not covered in Three Houses. They also wanted to portray different sides of the three faction leaders, and not invalidate character bonds established in Three Houses between Byleth and the other characters. There was some concern about the development load of three different storylines, but the team never reached the point of reducing the game to a single storyline. As part of the altered portrayal and exploration of its themes, Byleth was made into an antagonistic figure, which also allowed the team to further explore Byleth's powers as the vessel of Sothis. Iwata described Shez as having a different appeal to Byleth, as they were an equal to their allies rather than positioned as their teacher. So both characters had a prominent personality, both Shez and Byleth were given full voice acting.

The gameplay design was described as a collaborative effort between Nintendo, Koei Tecmo, and original series developer Intelligent Systems. When describing the different gameplay styles they had brought together, the team described it as a "new genre" that blended action, tactical and simulation design elements. The combat system was carried over from Fire Emblem Warriors, along with a simplified version of the class system which required some alterations to work within the systems of Three Hopes. The team wanted to introduce new gameplay elements to address recurring criticism of the Warriors combat style being repetitive. For Shez, their unique "Fluegal" class was designed to be a good one for new players, with the team needing to reduce their combat ability after early tester feedback described them as too powerful. The social elements were based on those present in Three Houses, adjusted to work within the game's battlefield focus. The Weapon Triangle, which was absent from Three Houses, was reintroduced to add additional tactical elements to the action combat. The game was built using the then-latest version of Koei Tecmo's internal Katana Engine.

The characters were designed by artist Chinatsu Kurahana, and art director Toshiyuki Kusakihara, both veterans of Three Houses. Kurahana designed Shez and Arval, while Kusakihara handled the rest of the cast based on summaries sent in by the scenario team. Commenting on the character redesigns, Kusakihara noted that the in-game time skip was shorter than in Three Houses, so the designs were reworked to be a middle ground between the original early and later designs. Many of their designs were also reworked to focus more on warfare, such as supporting character Hubert who was given design elements common to military commanders in contrast to his Three Houses portrayal as a strategist. The original Japanese cast returned, with Iwata noting that performances from voice actors who were now more experienced brought too much confidence to their roles at times. Due to how the storyline was structured, both Byleth and Shez had a lot more voice acting compared to Byleth's near-silent portrayal in Three Houses. The music was co-composed and arranged by Yosuke Kinoshita, Hiromu Akaba, Asami Mitake, Ayako Toyoda, and Yuki Matsumura. While the soundtrack included rock remixes of themes from Three Houses, a feature common to the Dynasty Warriors series, it also focused more on original orchestral elements.

Three Hopes was announced during a Nintendo Direct in January 2022. A game demo was made available on June 8, 2022, giving access to the first three chapters of the story and carry over save progress into the main game. The game released worldwide on June 24, 2022, and is compatible with Nintendo's successor console Nintendo Switch 2 with improved performance and load times. A soundtrack album was released in Japan on March 22, 2023. The English dub included one of the last performances by Billy Kametz as supporting character Ferdinand; Kametz died of colon cancer two weeks before the game's release.

== Reception ==
=== Pre-release ===
Eurogamer, playing the demo, felt the game was "a significant improvement over the first Fire Emblem Warriors", citing deeper strategy and more polish. VG247 and Nintendo Life also praised the demo, calling it "the most fun [they've] had with a Nintendo Musou since the original Hyrule Warriors" and "set to improve everything about its predecessor", respectively.

=== Critical response ===
Reception

Aggregate scores
Aggregator	Score
Metacritic	80/100
OpenCritic	82% recommend

Review scores
Publication	Score
Destructoid	9/10
Easy Allies	8.0/10
Eurogamer	Recommended
Famitsu	9/10, 9/10, 9/10, 9/10
Game Informer	8/10
GameSpot	7/10
GamesRadar+	3.5/5
Hardcore Gamer	4/5
IGN	8/10
Nintendo Life	9/10
Nintendo World Report	7.5/10
RPGamer	4/5
RPGFan	90/100
Shacknews	8/10
TouchArcade	4/5
Video Games Chronicle	4/5

Fire Emblem Warriors: Three Hopes received an aggregate score of 80/100 on Metacritic, indicating "generally favorable" reviews. While critics felt that Three Hopes improved upon its predecessor with good performance and increased depth and strategy that would appeal to fans of the Warriors games, they noted that it would fail to compel those who did not favor its signature hack and slash gameplay, and that gameplay could quickly get repetitive. Other critics noted the number of mechanics, which could be overwhelming, with many being continually introduced even relatively late into the game's story. Many critics felt as though the game improved greatly on the prior entries of the Warriors games, feeling as though it blended elements of Fire Emblem's gameplay, such as the relationship building of Three Houses, with the Warriors series effectively. Reviewers in the Japanese magazine Famitsu found it fresh to see the Fire Emblem gameplay mesh with the Warriors games.

Chris Carter of Destructoid lauded the title's incorporation of tension and technical nuance seen in game mechanics such as the warp function, micro-narratives, and last-second enemy ambushes, though noted that the game did not go all the way in differentiating its gameplay from its predecessor. Wesley LeBlanc of Game Informer positively highlighted the game's strong narrative, additionally praising the usage of social gameplay taken from Three Houses, but took issue with the visuals, which he felt didn't "pop" and were largely similar throughout the game, and some subpar pacing in the game's story. RPGamer's Alex Fuller felt that, though the game relied on the player having knowledge of Three Houses' events, resulting in a lack of explanation in-game as to the stakes of the conflict, the character interactions players could have at camp were a strong highlight of the game. Brian Mackenzie of RPGFan praised the social interaction system in the game, noting the strength in the game's characters, including Shez, despite some narrative inconsistencies that could occur as a result of unlocking conversations out of order. Chris Scullion of Video Games Chronicle highlighted the game's focus on its characters, stating that players of Three Houses would enjoy the game, though GamesRadar+'s Hirun Cryer felt that the game was ineffective at expanding upon characters previously seen in Three Houses. Nintendo World Report's Melanie Zawodniak felt the game was a step up from previous Warriors titles, though noted that the game's story resolved in a largely unsatisfying manner, and that chapters required for viewing the "true ending" were easily missed.

=== Sales ===
Fire Emblem Warriors: Three Hopes sold 97,538 physical copies within its first week of release in Japan, making it the bestselling retail game of the week in the country. The game also topped the weekly sales chart upon release in South Korea, Taiwan, and the United Kingdom. Within two months of release, the game had shipped over 1 million units worldwide physically and digitally.
