= List of video games released in 2017 =

The following is a comprehensive index of all games released in 2017, sorted chronologically by release date, and divided by quarter. Information regarding developer, publisher, operating system, genre, and type of release is provided where available.

For a summary of 2017 in video games as a whole, see 2017 in video games.

== Legend ==
Video game platforms
3DS	Nintendo 3DS, 3DS Virtual Console, iQue 3DS	DROID	Android	iOS	iOS, iPhone, iPod, iPadOS, iPad, visionOS, Apple Vision Pro
LIN	Linux, SteamOS	NS	Nintendo Switch	OSX	macOS
PS3	PlayStation 3	PS4	PlayStation 4	PSV	PlayStation Vita
PSVR	Playstation VR, PlayStation VR2	Quest	Meta Quest / Oculus Quest family, including Oculus Rift	SNES	Super NES / Super Famicom / Super Comboy
Vive	HTC Vive	Wii	Wii, WiiWare, Wii Virtual Console	WiiU	Wii U, WiiU Virtual Console
WIN	Windows, all versions Windows 95 and up	XB360	Xbox 360, Xbox 360 Live Arcade	XBO	Xbox One

Types of releases
Compilation	A compilation, anthology or collection of several titles, usually (but not always) belonging to the same series
Early access	A game launched in early access is unfinished and thus might contain bugs and glitches or have some of the content missing
Episodic	An episodic video game that is released in batches over a period of time
Expansion	A large-scale DLC to an already existing game that adds new story, areas and additions and/or changes to the game's mechanics
Full release	A full release of a game that launched in early access first
Limited	A special release (often called "Limited" or "Collector's Edition") with bonus collector's material. Often provided to people who pre-order a game
Port	The game first appeared on a different platform and a port was made. The game is like the original, with few or no differences
Remake	The game is an enhanced remake of an original, made using a new engine and/or assets and thus containing completely new sound, graphics and possibly changes to the story and/or gameplay
Remaster	The game is a remaster of an original, released on the same or different platform, with (usually minor) changes to graphics, sound and/or gameplay
Rerelease	The game was re-released on the same platform with no or only minor changes

Video game genres
Action	Action game	Action RPG	Action role-playing game	Action-adventure	Action-adventure game
Adventure	Adventure game	Brawler	Beat 'em up	City builder	City-building game
CMS	Construction and management simulation	Dungeon crawl	Dungeon crawl	Fighting	Fighting game
FPS	First-person shooter	Graphic adventure	Graphic adventure	Hack and slash	Hack and slash
Horror	Horror game	Interactive film	Interactive film	Metroidvania	Metroidvania
MMO	Massively multiplayer online game	MOBA	Multiplayer online battle arena	Music	Music video game
Party	Party video game	Platformer	Platformer	Puzzle	Puzzle video game
Puzzle-platformer	Puzzle-platformer	Racing	Racing video game	Rhythm	Rhythm game
Roguelike	Roguelike, Roguelite	RPG	Role-playing video game	RTS	Real-time strategy
RTT	Real-time tactics	Sandbox	Sandbox game	Shoot 'em up	Shoot 'em up
Shooter	Shooter game	Simulation	Simulation video game	Sports	Sports video game
Stealth	Stealth game	Strategy	Strategy video game	Survival	Survival game
Survival horror	Survival horror	Tactical RPG	Tactical role-playing game	Tactical shooter	Tactical shooter
TBS	Turn-based strategy	TPS	Third-person shooter	Visual novel	Visual novel

== List ==
=== January–March ===
Release date	Title	Platform	Type	Genre	Developer	Publisher	Ref.
January 5	Milkmaid of the Milky Way	WIN, OSX, iOS		Puzzle, Adventure			
January 10	Hatsune Miku: Project DIVA Future Tone	PS4		Rhythm			
January 11	Criminal Girls: Invite Only	WIN		RPG			
January 12	Danganronpa V3: Killing Harmony (JP)	PS4, PSV		Adventure, Visual novel			
January 12	School Girl/Zombie Hunter (JP)	PS4		TPS			
January 13	Rise & Shine	WIN, XBO					
January 17	Atelier Shallie Plus: Alchemists of the Dusk Sea	PSV		RPG			
January 17	Fate/Extella: The Umbral Star	PS4, PSV		Action			
January 17	Mighty Morphin Power Rangers: Mega Battle	PS4, XBO		Brawler			
January 19	Birthdays the Beginning (JP)	PS4					
January 19	Valkyria Revolution (JP)	PS4, PSV		Action RPG			
January 20	Dragon Quest VIII: Journey of the Cursed King	3DS		RPG			
January 20	Gravity Rush 2	PS4		Action-adventure			
January 20	Urban Empire	WIN					
January 22	Don Bradman Cricket 17	WIN		Sports (cricket)			
January 24	Kingdom Hearts HD 2.8 Final Chapter Prologue	PS4		Action RPG			
January 24	Pokémon Duel	iOS, DROID		Digital tabletop			
January 24	Resident Evil 7: Biohazard	WIN, PS4, XBO	Original	Survival horror			
January 24	Tales of Berseria	WIN, PS4		Action RPG			
January 24	Yakuza 0	PS4		Action-adventure			
January 25	Memoranda	WIN, OSX, LIN					
January 26	Twin Star Exorcists (JP)	PSV					
January 30	Disgaea 2	WIN		Tactical RPG			
January 30	Double Dragon IV	WIN, PS4		Brawler			
January 31	Angels with Scaly Wings	WIN, PS4, XBO		Visual novel, Dating sim			
January 31	Digimon World: Next Order	PS4		RPG			
January 31	Divide	PS4					
January 31	Dynasty Warriors: Godseekers	PS4, PSV		RPG			
February 1	Poi	WIN		Platformer			
February 2	Fire Emblem Heroes	iOS, DROID		Tactical RPG			
February 3	A House of Many Doors	WIN, OSX					
February 3	Husk	WIN					
February 3	Poochy & Yoshi's Woolly World	3DS		Platformer			
February 7	Atelier Sophie: The Alchemist of the Mysterious Book	WIN		RPG			
February 7	Nights of Azure	WIN		Action RPG			
February 7	Nioh	PS4		Action RPG, Hack and slash			
February 7	Reconstrucción	DROID, iOS		Adventure			
February 7	Splasher	WIN		Platformer			
February 7	WWE 2K17	WIN		Sports			
February 9	OK Golf	iOS		Sports			
February 10	Bendy and the Ink Machine – Chapter One: Moving Pictures	WIN, OSX, LIN		Survival horror			
February 14	Fairy Fencer F Advent Dark Force	WIN		RPG			
February 14	For Honor	WIN, PS4, XBO		Action, Fighting			
February 14	Ride 2	PS4, XBO		Racing			
February 14	Sniper Elite 4	WIN, PS4, XBO	Original	Tactical shooter, Stealth			
February 15	Mage: The Ascension – Refuge	WIN, OSX, LIN, DROID, iOS		Interactive fiction			
February 15	Vampire: The Masquerade – We Eat Blood	WIN, OSX, LIN, DROID, iOS		Interactive fiction			
February 17	A Demon's Game - Episode 1	WIN					
February 21	Berserk and the Band of the Hawk	WIN, PS4, PSV		Action RPG, Hack and slash			
February 21	Halo Wars 2	WIN, XBO		RTS			
February 21	Night in the Woods	WIN, OSX, LIN, PS4		Adventure			
February 21	Psychonauts in the Rhombus of Ruin	PS4		Puzzle, Adventure			
February 21	Ys Origin	PS4		Action RPG			
February 24	Hollow Knight	WIN		Metroidvania			
February 28	Horizon Zero Dawn	PS4	Original	Action RPG			
February 28	Story of Seasons: Trio of Towns	3DS		Farming, RPG			
February 28	Torment: Tides of Numenera	WIN, PS4, XBO		RPG			
March 1	Robo Recall	WIN		FPS			
March 2	Winning Post 8 2017 (JP)	WIN, PS4, PS3, PSV					
March 3	1-2-Switch	NS		Party			
March 3	The Binding of Isaac: Afterbirth+	NS		Roguelike			
March 3	Human Resource Machine	NS		Puzzle			
March 3	I am Setsuna	NS		RPG			
March 3	Just Dance 2017	NS		Rhythm			
March 3	The Legend of Zelda: Breath of the Wild	NS, WiiU		Action-adventure			
March 3	Little Inferno	NS		Puzzle			
March 3	Skylanders: Imaginators	NS		Platformer, RPG			
March 3	Snipperclips	NS		Puzzle			
March 3	Super Bomberman R	NS		Action, Maze			
March 3	World of Goo	NS		Puzzle			
March 7	Atelier Firis: The Alchemist and the Mysterious Journey	WIN, PS4, PSV		RPG			
March 7	Lego Worlds	WIN, PS4, XBO		Sandbox			
March 7	Loot Rascals	WIN, PS4					
March 7	Nier: Automata	PS4	Original	Action RPG			
March 7	Tom Clancy's Ghost Recon Wildlands	WIN, PS4, XBO		Tactical shooter			
March 7	Ultimate Marvel vs. Capcom 3	WIN, XBO		Fighting			
March 13	Bit City	iOS, DROID		City builder, Clicker			
March 14	Danganronpa 1•2 Reload	PS4		Adventure, Visual novel			
March 14	Styx: Shards of Darkness	WIN, PS4, XBO		Stealth			
March 15	Future Unfolding	WIN					
March 16	100ft Robot Golf	WIN		Sports			
March 16	Accel World vs. Sword Art Online: Millennium Twilight (JP)	PS4, PSV		Action RPG			
March 16	Senran Kagura: Peach Beach Splash (JP)	PS4		TPS			
March 17	Kona	WIN, OSX, LIN, PS4, XBO					
March 17	Nier: Automata	WIN	Port	Action RPG			
March 21	EVERYTHING	PS4		Simulation			
March 21	Mass Effect: Andromeda	WIN, PS4, XBO	Original	Action RPG			
March 21	Toukiden 2	WIN, PS4, PSV		Action RPG			
March 21	Troll and I	WIN, PS4, XBO		Action-adventure			
March 22	Super Mario Run	DROID		Endless runner			
March 24	Mario Sports Superstars	3DS		Sports			
March 24	Zero Escape: The Nonary Games	WIN, PS4, PSV		Adventure			
March 27	Operation Abyss: New Tokyo Legacy	WIN		RPG, Dungeon crawl			
March 28	Has-Been Heroes	WIN, NS, PS4, XBO		Action, Roguelike, Strategy			
March 28	Kingdom Hearts HD 1.5 Remix	PS4		Action RPG			
March 28	Kingdom Hearts HD 2.5 Remix	PS4		Action RPG			
March 28	MLB The Show 17	PS4		Sports			
March 28	Old Time Hockey	WIN, PS4, XBO		Sports			
March 28	Rain World	WIN, PS4		Platformer			
March 28	Rivals of Aether	WIN		Fighting			
March 28	Snake Pass	WIN, NS, PS4, XBO		Puzzle-platformer			
March 28	The Walking Dead: Season Three — Episode 3	WIN, OSX, PS4, XBO, iOS, DROID		Graphic adventure			
March 30	The Alliance Alive (JP)	3DS		RPG			
March 30	Attack on Titan: Escape from Certain Death (JP)	3DS					
March 30	Blue Reflection (JP)	PS4, PSV		RPG			
March 30	Musou Stars (JP)	PS4, PSV		Hack and slash, Action			
March 30	Thimbleweed Park	WIN, OSX, LIN, XBO		PCA			

=== April–June ===
Release date	Title	Platform	Type	Genre	Developer	Publisher	Ref.
April 4	Drawn to Death	PS4		TPS			
April 4	Lego City Undercover	WIN, NS, PS4, XBO		Action-adventure			
April 4	Mortal Blitz	PSVR					
April 4	PaRappa the Rapper Remastered	PS4		Rhythm			
April 4	Persona 5	PS4, PS3		RPG, Social sim			
April 5	Paradigm	WIN, OSX		PCA			
April 7	Bulletstorm: Full Clip Edition	WIN, PS4, XBO		FPS			
April 10	The Signal from Tölva	WIN					
April 11	Aaero	WIN, PS4, XBO		Action, Rhythm			
April 11	Bayonetta	WIN	Port	Action, Hack and slash			
April 11	Cosmic Star Heroine	WIN, PS4		RPG			
April 11	Lichtspeer	PSV		Action			
April 11	A Rose in the Twilight	WIN, PSV		Adventure, Strategy			
April 11	The Sexy Brutale	WIN, PS4, XBO					
April 11	StarBlood Arena	PSVR					
April 11	Yooka-Laylee	WIN, OSX, PS4, XBO		Platformer			
April 12	Team Kirby Clash Deluxe	3DS		Action, Platformer			
April 13	The Jackbox Party Pack 3	NS	Port	Party	Jackbox Games	Jackbox Games	
April 18	ATV Renegades	PS4, XBO					
April 18	Bendy and the Ink Machine — Chapter Two: The Old Song	WIN, OSX, LIN		Survival horror			
April 18	The Disney Afternoon Collection	WIN, PS4, XBO		Action, Platformer			
April 18	Flinthook	WIN, PS4, XBO		Platformer, Roguelike			
April 18	Full Throttle Remastered	WIN, PS4, PSV		Graphic adventure			
April 18	Guardians of the Galaxy: The Telltale Series — Episode 1: Tangled Up in Blue	WIN, OSX, PS4, XBO, iOS, DROID		Graphic adventure			
April 18	Herocade	PSVR					
April 18	Shiness: The Lightning Kingdom	WIN, PS4, XBO					
April 18	The Silver Case	PS4		Adventure, Visual novel			
April 18	Voodoo Vince: Remastered	WIN, XBO		Platformer			
April 18	Wonder Boy: The Dragon's Trap	NS, PS4, XBO		Platformer, Action-adventure			
April 21	Cities: Skylines	XBO		City builder, CMS			
April 24	Statik	PSVR					
April 25	Dragon Quest Heroes II	WIN, PS4		Action RPG, Hack and slash			
April 25	Outlast 2	WIN, OSX, PS4, XBO		Survival horror			
April 25	Pinstripe	WIN, iOS		Puzzle, Adventure			
April 25	Puyo Puyo Tetris	NS, PS4		Puzzle			
April 25	Sniper Ghost Warrior 3	WIN, PS4, XBO		Tactical shooter, Stealth			
April 25	Syberia III	PS4, XBO		Graphic adventure			
April 25	The Walking Dead: Season Three — Episode 4	WIN, OSX, PS4, XBO, iOS, DROID		Graphic adventure			
April 25	What Remains of Edith Finch	WIN, PS4		Adventure			
April 27	De Blob	WIN		Puzzle-platformer			
April 27	Expeditions: Vikings	WIN					
April 27	Psycho-Pass: Mandatory Happiness	WIN		Visual novel			
April 27	Warhammer 40,000: Dawn of War III	WIN		RTS			
April 28	Little Nightmares	WIN, PS4, XBO		Puzzle-platformer, Survival horror			
April 28	Mario Kart 8 Deluxe	NS		Racing (kart)			
May 2	The Caligula Effect	PSV		RPG			
May 2	GNOG	PSVR					
May 2	Gundam Breaker 3 Break Edition	PS4, PSV					
May 3	The Legend of Heroes: Trails in the Sky the 3rd	WIN		RPG			
May 5	Dreamfall Chapters: The Longest Journey	PS4, XBO		Adventure			
May 5	Prey	WIN, PS4, XBO					
May 5	World to the West	WIN, OSX, LIN, PS4, XBO					
May 8	Creativerse	WIN, OSX		Survival, Sandbox			
May 9	Birthdays the Beginning	WIN, PS4					
May 9	Butcher	PS4					
May 9	Elliot Quest	PS4		Platformer, Adventure, Metroidvania			
May 9	LocoRoco Remastered	PS4		Puzzle-platformer			
May 9	Moonshot Galaxy	PSVR					
May 9	NBA Playgrounds	WIN, NS, PS4, XBO		Sports			
May 9	Polybius	PSVR					
May 9	Revenant Saga	PS4, PS3, PSV					
May 9	Strafe	WIN		FPS			
May 10	Butcher	XBO					
May 10	Crash Club	iOS, DROID		MMO			
May 10	Rakuen	WIN, OSX, LIN		Adventure			
May 11	Elliot Quest	3DS, XBO		Platformer, Adventure, Metroidvania			
May 11	Minecraft	NS		Sandbox, Survival			
May 12	Demon's Crystals	PS4, XBO					
May 12	To the Moon	iOS, DROID		Adventure			
May 16	Akiba's Beat	PS4, PSV		Action RPG			
May 16	Deemo: The Last Recital	PSV		Rhythm			
May 16	Farpoint	PSVR		FPS			
May 16	Future Unfolding	PS4					
May 16	Hakuoki: Kyoto Winds (NA)	PSV					
May 16	Injustice 2	PS4, XBO		Fighting			
May 16	Operation Babel: New Tokyo Legacy	WIN, PSV		RPG, Dungeon crawl			
May 16	Phantom Dust Remaster	WIN, XBO		Action, RTS			
May 16	Seasons After Fall	PS4, XBO		Puzzle-platformer			
May 16	The Surge	WIN, PS4, XBO		Action RPG			
May 17	Black & White Bushido	PS4, XBO					
May 17	Bokida: Heartfelt Reunion	WIN					
May 17	Oceanhorn: Monster of Uncharted Seas	PSV		Action-adventure			
May 18	Mages of Mystralia	WIN		Action-adventure			
May 18	Thumper	NS		Rhythm			
May 19	Chroma Squad	PS4, XBO		Tactical RPG			
May 19	Fire Emblem Echoes: Shadows of Valentia	3DS		Tactical RPG			
May 19	A Hole New World	WIN, OSX, LIN					
May 19	Shadow Warrior 2	PS4, XBO		FPS			
May 19	Skylar & Plux: Adventure on Clover Island	WIN, PS4, XBO		Platformer			
May 20	Valkyrie Drive: Bhikkhuni	WIN					
May 23	Darksiders: Warmastered Edition	WiiU		Hack and slash, Action-adventure			
May 23	Disgaea 5 Complete	NS		Tactical RPG			
May 23	Embers of Mirrim	WIN, PS4					
May 23	Impact Winter	WIN					
May 23	Utawarerumono: Mask of Deception	PS4, PSV		Tactical RPG, Visual novel			
May 24	Global Soccer Manager 2017	WIN		Sports			
May 25	Harvest Moon: Lil' Farmers	iOS, DROID					
May 25	Vanquish	WIN		Action, TPS			
May 26	Constructor HD	WIN, NS, PS4, XBO		RTS, CMS			
May 26	Drive Girls (EU)	PSV					
May 26	Friday the 13th: The Game	WIN, PS4, XBO		Survival horror			
May 26	Guilty Gear Xrd Rev.2	PS4, PS3		Fighting			
May 26	Rime	WIN, PS4, XBO		Puzzle			
May 26	Samurai Warriors: Spirit of Sanada (NA)	WIN, PS4		Hack and slash, Action			
May 26	Ultra Street Fighter II: The Final Challengers	NS		Fighting			
May 30	Astro Duel Deluxe	NS					
May 30	Danger Zone	WIN, PS4					
May 30	Deep Space Waifu	WIN		Action			
May 30	Don't Knock Twice	Vive, Quest		Survival horror			
May 30	MXGP3: The Official Motocross Videogame	WIN, PS4, XBO					
May 30	Rising Storm 2: Vietnam	WIN		Tactical shooter, FPS			
May 30	Star Trek: Bridge Crew	Vive, Quest, PSVR		Action-adventure			
May 30	The Walking Dead: Season Three — Episode 5	WIN, OSX, PS4, XBO, iOS, DROID		Graphic adventure			
May 30	Ys Origin	PSV		Action RPG			
May 31	Damascus Gear: Operation Tokyo HD Edition	PS4					
May 31	Thea: The Awakening	PS4, XBO					
May 31	Tokyo 42	WIN, XBO		Action			
June 1	Incidence	iOS		Sports			
June 1	Seiken Densetsu Collection (JP)	NS		Action RPG, Action-adventure, RTS			
June 1	Spirit Hunter: Death Mark (JP)	PSV		Adventure, Visual novel			
June 2	Dies irae: Amantes amentes	WIN		Visual novel			
June 2	Tekken 7	WIN, PS4, XBO		Fighting			
June 5	Monument Valley 2	iOS		Puzzle			
June 6	Cladun Returns: This is Sengoku!	WIN, PS4, PSV		Action RPG			
June 6	Conarium	WIN		Adventure			
June 6	Dark Rose Valkyrie	PS4		RPG			
June 6	Dirt 4	WIN, PS4, XBO		Racing			
June 6	Farming Simulator 18	3DS, PSV		Simulation			
June 6	Guardians of the Galaxy: The Telltale Series — Episode 2: Under Pressure	WIN, OSX, PS4, XBO, iOS, DROID		Graphic adventure			
June 6	Superbeat: Xonic	PS4		Music, Rhythm			
June 6	Wipeout Omega Collection	PS4		Racing			
June 7	Superbeat: Xonic	XBO		Music, Rhythm			
June 8	Shantae: Half-Genie Hero	NS		Platformer, Metroidvania			
June 12	Superdimension Neptune VS Sega Hard Girls	WIN					
June 13	Cars 3: Driven to Win	NS, PS4, PS3, XBO, XB360, WiiU		Racing			
June 15	Kindergarten	WIN, OSX		Puzzle, Adventure	Con Man Games, Sean Young	SmashGames	
June 15	MotoGP 17	WIN, PS4, XBO		Racing			
June 16	Arms	NS		Fighting			
June 20	Dead by Daylight	PS4, XBO		Survival horror			
June 20	Final Fantasy XIV: Stormblood	WIN, OSX, PS4		MMO, RPG			
June 20	God Wars: Future Past	PS4, PSV		Tactical RPG			
June 20	Nex Machina	WIN, PS4		Shoot 'em up			
June 22	Oceanhorn: Monster of Uncharted Seas	NS		Action-adventure			
June 23	Ever Oasis	3DS		Action-adventure, RPG			
June 23	Get Even	WIN, PS4, XBO		FPS			
June 23	Secret World Legends	WIN					
June 27	Danganronpa Another Episode: Ultra Despair Girls	WIN, PS4		Action-adventure			
June 27	The Golf Club 2	WIN, PS4, XBO		Sports			
June 27	Valkyria Revolution	PS4, PSV, XBO		Action RPG			
June 30	Crash Bandicoot N. Sane Trilogy	PS4		Platformer			
June 30	Micro Machines World Series	WIN, PS4, XBO		Racing			
June 30	Tokyo Xanadu	PSV		Action RPG			

=== July–September ===
Release date	Title	Platform	Type	Genre	Developer	Publisher	Ref.
July 4	That's You!	PS4		Party			
July 4	Walden, a game	WIN, OSX		Walking sim, Serious, Educational			
July 6	Kirby's Blowout Blast	3DS		Action, Platformer			
July 7	Accel World VS. Sword Art Online	PS4, PSV					
July 7	Little Red Lie	WIN, OSX		Adventure			
July 11	Derelict Fleet	WIN, PS4					
July 11	Final Fantasy XII: The Zodiac Age	PS4		RPG			
July 12	The End Is Nigh	WIN		Platformer, Adventure			
July 12	Energy Balance	PSV					
July 14	Antisphere	WIN, PS4, XBO					
July 18	Children of Zodiarcs	WIN, OSX, PS4					
July 18	Fallen Legion: Flames of Rebellion	PSV		RPG, Platformer, Action			
July 18	Fallen Legion: Sins of an Empire	PS4		RPG, Platformer, Action			
July 18	Yonder: The Cloud Catcher Chronicles	WIN, PS4		Adventure			
July 20	Kingdoms and Castles	WIN					
July 20	Lone Echo	WIN, Quest		Adventure			
July 21	Splatoon 2	NS		TPS			
July 24	Heroes of the Seven Seas	PSVR					
July 25	Aven Colony	WIN, PS4, XBO		City builder, Strategy			
July 25	Fable Fortune	WIN, XBO		DCCG			
July 25	Pyre	WIN, PS4		Action RPG, Sports			
July 25	Super CloudBuilt	WIN, PS4					
July 27	Galaxy of Pen & Paper	DROID, LIN, OSX, iOS, WIN		RPG			
July 27	Overcooked	NS		Simulation			
July 28	Collar × Malice	PSV		Visual novel			
July 28	Hey! Pikmin	3DS		Action			
July 28	Miitopia	3DS		RPG			
July 28	Sundered	WIN, PS4					
July 28	Super CloudBuilt	XBO					
July 29	Dragon Quest XI (JP)	3DS, PS4		RPG			
July 30	Black Souls I	WIN		RPG			
August 1	Dino Frontier	PSVR					
August 1	Patapon Remastered	PS4		Rhythm, God game			
August 1	Slime Rancher	WIN, OSX, LIN, XBO		Life sim, Adventure			
August 2	Tacoma	WIN, OSX, LIN, XBO		Adventure			
August 7	Party Panic	WIN, OSX, LIN					
August 8	Blackhole	PS4		Puzzle-platformer			
August 8	Hellblade: Senua's Sacrifice	WIN, PS4		Action-adventure, Hack and slash			
August 8	Icey	PS4		Hack and slash			
August 8	LawBreakers	WIN, PS4		FPS			
August 8	Neptune Flux	PSVR					
August 8	Rogue Hearts	iOS, DROID		RPG	Ninetail Games	Ninetail Games	
August 8	Sine Mora EX	WIN, PS4, XBO		Shoot 'em up			
August 10	West of Loathing	WIN, OSX, LIN		RPG			
August 11	Code 7: A Story-Driven Hacking Adventure Episode 1: Threading	WIN, OSX, LIN		Adventure, Typing			
August 11	Sudden Strike 4	WIN, OSX, LIN		RTT			
August 14	StarCraft: Remastered	WIN		RTS			
August 15	Agents of Mayhem	WIN, PS4, XBO		Action-adventure			
August 15	Cities: Skylines	PS4		City builder, CMS			
August 15	Matterfall	PS4		Shooter			
August 15	Nidhogg 2	WIN, OSX, PS4		Fighting			
August 15	Night Trap 25th Anniversary	WIN, PS4		Interactive film			
August 15	Observer	WIN, PS4, XBO		Horror (psych)			
August 15	The Pillars of The Earth Book 1: From The Ashes	WIN, OSX, LIN, PS4, XBO					
August 15	Sonic Mania	NS, PS4, XBO		Platformer			
August 15	Sudden Strike 4	PS4		RTT			
August 15	Troll and I	NS		Action-adventure			
August 15	Undertale	PS4, PSV		RPG			
August 17	The Jackbox Party Pack	NS	Port	Party	Jackbox Games	Jackbox Games	
August 17	The Jackbox Party Pack 2	NS	Port	Party	Jackbox Games	Jackbox Games	
August 22	ChromaGun	PS4		FPS, Puzzle			
August 22	The Escapists 2	WIN, PS4, XBO		Strategy, RPG			
August 22	Guardians of the Galaxy: The Telltale Series — Episode 3: More Than a Feeling	WIN, OSX, PS4, XBO, iOS, DROID		Graphic adventure			
August 22	Mages of Mystralia	PS4		Action-adventure			
August 22	MagiCat	WIN		Puzzle-platformer			
August 22	Minecraft: Story Mode	NS		Graphic adventure, Interactive film			
August 22	Uncharted: The Lost Legacy	PS4	Original	Action-adventure, TPS, Platformer			
August 22	White Day: A Labyrinth Named School	WIN, PS4		Survival horror			
August 23	Cat Bird	iOS, DROID		Platformer			
August 24	The Lost Child (JP)	PS4, PSV					
August 25	F1 2017	WIN, PS4, XBO		Racing			
August 25	Letterpress	DROID		TBS, Word			
August 25	Madden NFL 18	PS4, XBO		Sports			
August 25	Naruto Shippuden: Ultimate Ninja Storm Legacy	WIN, PS4, XBO					
August 25	One Piece: Unlimited World Red Deluxe Edition	WIN, PS4		Action-adventure			
August 29	Absolver	WIN, PS4		Action RPG			
August 29	Ark: Survival Evolved	WIN, OSX, LIN, PS4, XBO		Action-adventure, Survival			
August 29	Everybody's Golf	PS4		Sports			
August 29	Mario + Rabbids Kingdom Battle	NS		TBT, Tactical RPG			
August 29	Obduction	PS4		Adventure, Puzzle			
August 29	Pillars of Eternity: Complete Edition	PS4, XBO		RPG			
August 29	ReCore Definitive Edition	WIN, XBO		Action-adventure, Platformer			
August 29	Redout	PS4, XBO		Racing			
August 29	Sonic Mania	WIN		Platformer			
August 29	Warriors All-Stars	WIN, PS4		Hack and slash, Action			
August 29	Windjammers	PS4, PSV		Sports			
August 29	Yakuza Kiwami	PS4		Action-adventure			
August 30	X-Morph: Defense	WIN, PS4					
August 30	Ys Seven	WIN		Action RPG			
August 31	Life Is Strange: Before the Storm — Episode 1	WIN, PS4, XBO		Graphic adventure			
August 31	Resident Evil: Revelations	PS4, XBO		Survival horror			
August 31	Wonderful Everyday	WIN		Visual novel			
September 1	Xenia	WIN					
September 5	Antiquia Lost	PS4, PSV					
September 5	Knack II	PS4		Action, Platformer			
September 5	Lego Worlds	NS		Sandbox			
September 5	R.B.I. Baseball 17	NS		Sports			
September 5	Utawarerumono: Mask of Truth	PS4, PSV		RTS, Visual novel, Eroge			
September 6	Destiny 2	PS4, XBO		FPS			
September 6	Senko no Ronde 2	WIN		Fighting, Shooter			
September 7	Kono Subarashii Sekai ni Shukufuku o! Kono Yokubukai Game ni Shinpan o! (JP)	PS4, PSV					
September 7	Senko no Ronde 2	PS4					
September 8	Monster Hunter Stories	3DS		RPG			
September 12	NASCAR Heat 2	WIN, PS4, XBO		Racing			
September 12	Pro Evolution Soccer 2018	WIN, PS3, PS4, XB360, XBO		Sports			
September 12	Rayman Legends Definitive Edition	NS		Platformer			
September 12	Time Recoil	PS4					
September 12	Tooth and Tail	WIN, PS4		RTS			
September 12	Ys VIII: Lacrimosa of Dana	WIN, PS4, PSV		Action RPG			
September 14	Baja: Edge of Control HD	WIN, PS4, XBO		Racing			
September 14	Divinity: Original Sin II	WIN		RPG			
September 14	Earthlock: Festival of Magic	WiiU		RPG			
September 14	Hiveswap	WIN, OSX, LIN		Adventure			
September 14	Iron Marines	iOS, DROID		RTS			
September 15	Dishonored: Death of the Outsider	WIN, PS4, XBO		Action-adventure, Stealth			
September 15	Metroid: Samus Returns	3DS		Action-adventure			
September 15	NBA Live 18	PS4, XBO		Sports			
September 15	NHL 18	PS4, XBO		Sports			
September 15	Tricky Towers	XBO		Puzzle			
September 18	Muv Luv Alternative	WIN		Visual novel			
September 18	The Solus Project	PS4, PSVR		Survival horror			
September 18	XING: The Land Beyond	WIN, PS4, PSVR					
September 19	Echo	WIN, PS4		Action, Stealth			
September 19	Hidden Dragon: Legend	PS4					
September 19	Marvel vs. Capcom: Infinite	WIN, PS4, XBO		Fighting			
September 19	Mary Skelter: Nightmares	PSV		RPG, Dungeon crawl			
September 19	NBA 2K18	WIN, NS, PS3, PS4, XB360, XBO		Sports			
September 19	Pankapu	PS4, XBO					
September 21	SteamWorld Dig 2	NS		Platformer, Action-adventure, Metroidvania			
September 22	Caveman Warriors	WIN, PS4, XBO					
September 22	Doki Doki Literature Club!	WIN, OSX		Visual novel			
September 22	Dragon Ball Xenoverse 2	NS		Fighting, RPG			
September 22	Guild Wars 2: Path of Fire	WIN		MMO, RPG			
September 22	The Lego Ninjago Movie Video Game	WIN, NS, PS4, XBO		Action-adventure			
September 22	Pokkén Tournament DX	NS		Fighting			
September 22	Project CARS 2	WIN, PS4, XBO		Racing (sim)			
September 22	SteamWorld Dig 2	WIN, OSX, LIN		Platformer, Action-adventure, Metroidvania			
September 26	Danganronpa V3: Killing Harmony	WIN, PS4, PSV		Adventure, Visual novel			
September 26	DWVR	PSVR					
September 26	Fortnite	WIN, PS4, XBO		Battle royale			
September 26	Hob	WIN, PS4		Action-adventure			
September 26	Light Tracer	PS4					
September 26	Lightfield	PS4, XBO					
September 26	Pinball FX 3	WIN, PS4, XBO		Pinball			
September 26	Raid: World War II	WIN		FPS, Tactical shooter			
September 26	Ruiner	WIN, PS4, XBO					
September 26	Senran Kagura: Peach Beach Splash	PS4		TPS			
September 26	Sine Mora EX	NS		Shoot 'em up			
September 26	SteamWorld Dig 2	PS4, PSV		Platformer, Action-adventure, Metroidvania			
September 28	Butcher	NS					
September 28	Deemo	NS		Rhythm			
September 28	Goken	WIN					
September 28	Golf Story	NS		RPG, Adventure, Sports			
September 28	The Legend of Heroes: Trails of Cold Steel III (JP)	PS4		RPG			
September 28	Outcast – Second Contact	WIN, PS4, XBO		Action-adventure			
September 28	Picross S	NS		Puzzle			
September 28	Total War: Warhammer II	WIN		TBS, RTT			
September 29	Cuphead	WIN, XBO		Run and gun			
September 29	FIFA 18	WIN, NS, PS3, PS4, XB360, XBO		Sports			
September 29	Gundam Versus	PS4					
September 29	One Piece: Unlimited World Red Deluxe Edition	NS		Action-adventure			
September 29	Star Fox 2	SNES (Classic)		Shoot 'em up, RTS			
September 29	Yo-Kai Watch 2: Psychic Specters	3DS		RPG			

=== October–December ===
Release date	Title	Platform	Type	Genre	Developer	Publisher	Ref.
October 2	Divided We Fall	WIN, OSX, LIN		RTS			
October 3	Battle Chasers: Nightwar	WIN, PS4, XBO					
October 3	Culdcept Revolt	3DS		TBS			
October 3	Forza Motorsport 7	WIN, XBO		Racing			
October 5	Arms Race - TCWE	WIN		Simulation			
October 5	Axiom Verge	NS		Metroidvania			
October 5	Dragon's Dogma: Dark Arisen (JP)	PS4, XBO		Action RPG, Hack and slash			
October 5	A Hat in Time	WIN, OSX		Platformer, Action-adventure			
October 5	Raiden V: Director's Cut	WIN, PS4		Shoot 'em up			
October 5	Stardew Valley	NS		Simulation, RPG			
October 6	Layton's Mystery Journey	3DS		Puzzle, Adventure			
October 6	Mario & Luigi: Superstar Saga + Bowser's Minions	3DS		RPG			
October 6	Oxenfree	NS		Graphic adventure			
October 10	88 Heroes: 98 Heroes Edition	NS					
October 10	Arktika.1	Quest					
October 10	Cyberdimension Neptunia: 4 Goddesses Online	PS4		Action RPG, Puzzle			
October 10	Guardians of the Galaxy: The Telltale Series — Episode 4: Who Needs You	WIN, OSX, PS4, XBO, iOS, DROID		Graphic adventure			
October 10	Middle-earth: Shadow of War	WIN, PS4, XBO	Original	Action RPG, Hack and slash			
October 10	Raid: World War II	PS4, XBO		FPS, Tactical shooter			
October 10	Tiny Barbarian DX	NS					
October 10	Touhou Kobuto V: Burst Battle	NS, PS4, PSV		Bullet hell, Shoot 'em up, Fighting			
October 11	Unbox: Newbies Adventure	NS					
October 13	Chaos;Child	PS4, PSV		Visual novel			
October 13	The Evil Within 2	WIN, PS4, XBO	Original	Survival horror			
October 15	Tear: Owari to Hajimari no Shizuku (JP)	PS4					
October 17	ELEX	WIN, PS4, XBO		Action RPG			
October 17	Etrian Odyssey V: Beyond the Myth	3DS		RPG, Dungeon crawl			
October 17	Gran Turismo Sport	PS4		Racing			
October 17	The Jackbox Party Pack 4	WIN, OSX, NS PS4, XBO		Party	Jackbox Games	Jackbox Games	
October 17	Megaton Rainfall	PS4, PSVR		Action			
October 17	Rogue Trooper Redux	WIN, PS4, XBO					
October 17	South Park: The Fractured but Whole	WIN, PS4, XBO		RPG			
October 17	WWE 2K18	WIN, PS4, XBO		Sports			
October 18	A Mortician's Tale	WIN, OSX					
October 19	City Shrouded in Shadow (JP)	PS4		Survival			
October 19	Life Is Strange: Before the Storm — Episode 2	WIN, PS4, XBO		Graphic adventure			
October 19	Spelunker Party!	WIN, NS		Platformer			
October 20	Fire Emblem Warriors	NS, 3DS		Hack and slash, RPG			
October 20	Syberia	NS		Graphic adventure			
October 23	High Hell	WIN, OSX		FPS			
October 24	Destiny 2	WIN		FPS			
October 24	Hidden Agenda	PS4		Adventure, Interactive film			
October 24	Just Dance 2018	PS4, PS3, XBO, XB360, NS, WiiU, Wii		Rhythm			
October 24	The Mummy Demastered	WIN, NS, PS4, XBO		Metroidvania			
October 24	Nights of Azure 2: Bride of the New Moon	WIN, NS, PS4		Action RPG			
October 24	Observer	OSX, LIN		Horror (psych)			
October 24	SingStar Celebration	PS4					
October 24	This Is the Police	NS		Adventure, Strategy			
October 24	Yomawari: Midnight Shadows	WIN, PS4, PSV		Survival horror			
October 25	Bury Me, My Love	iOS, DROID		Visual novel			
October 26	Kowloon's Gate VR: Suzaku (JP)	PSVR					
October 26	Taiko Drum Master: Drum Session	PS4					
October 27	Assassin's Creed: Origins	WIN, PS4, XBO	Original	Action-adventure, Stealth			
October 27	Super Mario Odyssey	NS		Platformer, Action-adventure			
October 27	Wolfenstein II: The New Colossus	WIN, PS4, XBO	Original	Action-adventure, FPS			
October 30	Lost Dimension	WIN		Tactical RPG			
October 31	Bubsy: The Woolies Strike Back	WIN, PS4		Platformer			
October 31	Cartoon Network: Battle Crashers	NS		Brawler			
October 31	Creeping Terror	3DS					
October 31	Monopoly for Nintendo Switch	NS					
October 31	Monster Jam: Crush It!	NS					
October 31	Summon Night 6: Lost Borders	PS4, PSV		Tactical RPG			
October 31	Zwei: The Ilvard Insurrection	WIN		Action RPG			
November 2	Sorcer Striker (JP)	PS4		Scrolling shooter			
November 3	.hack//G.U. Last Recode	WIN, PS4		Action RPG			
November 3	Call of Duty: WWII	WIN, PS4, XBO	Original	FPS			
November 7	Guardians of the Galaxy: The Telltale Series – Episode 5: Don't Stop Believin'	WIN, OSX, PS4, XBO, iOS, DROID		Graphic adventure			
November 7	Hand of Fate 2	WIN, OSX, LIN, PS4, XBO		Action RPG			
November 7	Nioh	WIN		Action RPG, Hack and slash			
November 7	Sonic Forces	WIN, NS, PS4, XBO		Platformer			
November 7	Super Lucky's Tale	WIN, XBO		Platformer			
November 9	Ace of Seafood	PS4					
November 10	Cat Quest	NS		Action RPG			
November 10	Doom	NS	Port	FPS			
November 10	Football Manager 2018	WIN, OSX, LIN		Sports			
November 10	Mario Party: The Top 100	3DS		Party			
November 10	Need for Speed Payback	WIN, PS4, XBO		Racing			
November 12	Nekojishi	WIN		Visual novel			
November 14	Batman: The Telltale Series	NS		Graphic adventure			
November 14	Ben 10	WIN, NS, PS4, XBO					
November 14	Demon Gaze II	PS4, PSV		RPG, Dungeon crawl			
November 14	Harvest Moon: Light of Hope	WIN		Farming			
November 14	Ittle Dew 2+	NS		Action-adventure, RPG			
November 14	L.A. Noire	NS, PS4, XBO	Port	Action-adventure			
November 14	Lego Marvel Super Heroes 2	WIN, NS, PS4, XBO		Action-adventure			
November 14	Rime	NS		Puzzle			
November 14	Road Rage	WIN, PS4, XBO		Vehicular combat, Racing			
November 14	Rocket League	NS		Sports			
November 14	Tokyo Tattoo Girls	WIN, PSV		Strategy			
November 16	Antiquia Lost	NS					
November 16	Lumo	NS		Puzzle-platformer			
November 16	Tannenberg	WIN, OSX, LIN		FPS			
November 17	The Elder Scrolls V: Skyrim	NS, PSVR		Action RPG			
November 17	MXGP3: The Official Motocross Videogame	NS					
November 17	Pokémon Ultra Sun and Ultra Moon	3DS		RPG			
November 17	School Girl/Zombie Hunter	PS4		TPS			
November 17	The Sims 4	PS4, XBO		Simulation			
November 17	Star Wars Battlefront II	WIN, PS4, XBO		FPS, TPS			
November 21	Animal Crossing: Pocket Camp	iOS, DROID		Social sim			
November 21	Gear.Club Unlimited	NS		Racing			
November 21	Project Nimbus: Code Mirai (JP)	PS4		Action, Shooter			
November 21	Superbeat: Xonic	NS		Music, Rhythm			
November 22	Earth Defense Force 4.1: Wing Diver The Shooter	PS4		TPS			
November 23	Portal Knights	NS		Action RPG, Survival			
November 28	Black Mirror	WIN, OSX, LIN, PS4, XBO		Adventure			
November 28	Resident Evil: Revelations	NS		Survival horror			
November 28	Resident Evil: Revelations 2	NS		Survival horror			
November 29	Carcassonne – Tiles & Tactics	WIN, DROID		Digital tabletop			
November 30	The Game Paradise: CruisinMix (JP)	WIN, PS4		Scrolling shooter			
November 30	Little Witch Academia: Chamber of Time (JP)	PS4		Action RPG			
November 30	Syberia II	NS		Graphic adventure			
December 1	Seven: The Days Long Gone	WIN		RPG			
December 1	Xenoblade Chronicles 2	NS		Action RPG			
December 5	Caveman Warriors	NS					
December 5	Dead Rising 4: Frank's Big Package	PS4		Action-adventure			
December 5	Nine Parchments	WIN, NS, PS4, XBO					
December 6	A Hat in Time	PS4, XBO		Platformer, Action-adventure			
December 6	WWE 2K18	NS		Sports			
December 7	Dreadnought	PS4		Vehicular combat (spaceship)			
December 7	Earth Defense Force 5 (JP)	PS4		TPS			
December 7	Kamen Rider: Climax Fighters	PS4					
December 7	SpellForce 3	WIN		RTS, RPG			
December 7	Yakuza Kiwami 2 (JP)	PS4		Action-adventure			
December 8	Hello Neighbor	WIN, OSX, XBO		Stealth, Survival horror			
December 8	Tokyo Xanadu eX+	WIN, PS4		Action RPG			
December 9	LocoRoco 2 Remastered	PS4		Puzzle-platformer			
December 12	Arcana Heart 3: Love Max Six Stars	WIN					
December 12	Fearful Symmetry & The Cursed Prince	WIN, XBO					
December 12	Ōkami HD	WIN, PS4, XBO		Action-adventure			
December 12	Party Planet	NS					
December 12	Pinball FX 3	NS		Pinball			
December 12	Rumu	WIN, LIN, OSX		Point-and-click adventure	Robot House	Hammerfall Publishing	
December 12	The End Is Nigh	NS	Port	Platformer, Adventure			
December 14	Enter the Gungeon	NS		Bullet hell, Roguelike			
December 14	Finding Paradise	WIN, OSX, LIN		Interactive drama, Adventure, RPG			
December 14	Gorogoa	WIN, OSX, NS		Puzzle			
December 14	Gungrave VR	PSVR		TPS			
December 14	Never Stop Sneakin'	NS		Action RPG, Hack and slash, Metroidvania			
December 14	Yooka-Laylee	NS		Platformer			
December 15	Omega Quintet	WIN		RPG			
December 15	Romancing SaGa 2	WIN, NS, PS4, PSV, XBO		RPG			
December 20	Defunct	PS4, XBO		Adventure			
December 20	Dragon Fang Z: The Rose & Dungeon of Time	NS					
December 20	Life Is Strange: Before the Storm — Episode 3	WIN, PS4, XBO		Graphic adventure			
December 20	Slice Dice and Rice (JP)	PS4					
December 21	Blossom Tales: The Sleeping King	NS					
December 21	Civilization VI	iOS		TBS, 4X			
December 21	Max: The Curse of Brotherhood	NS		Puzzle-platformer			
December 21	Tiny Metal	WIN, NS, PS4		TBT			
December 25	Style Savvy: Styling Star	3DS		Simulation			
