= Divided We Fall =

Divided We Fall may refer to:

- "United we stand, divided we fall", a motto
- "Divided We Fall" (short story), by Raymond F. Jones
- Divided We Fall (film), a 2000 Czech film directed by Jan Hřebejk
- Divided We Fall (Flaw album), a 2016 album by Flaw
- Divided We Fall (Biohazard album), a 2025 album by American heavy metal band Biohazard
- Divided We Fall (video game), a 2016 real-time strategy game
- "Divided We Fall" (Justice League Unlimited episode), a 2005 episode of Justice League Unlimited
- Divided We Fall (novel), a 2014 novel by Trent Reedy

== See also ==
- United We Stand (disambiguation)
- United We Fall (disambiguation)
- Divided We Stand (disambiguation)
