= Allegra Clark =

American voice actress

- Clark at Animate! Philadelphia in 2026
- Born: July 11, 1988 (age 38); New York City, U.S.
- Occupation: Voice actress
- Years active: 2014–present
- Website: www.allegraclark.com

Allegra Clark (born July 11, 1988) is an American voice actress who is known for her roles in video games and anime. Some of her best-known roles include Maki Zen'in in Jujutsu Kaisen, Josephine in Dragon Age: Inquisition, Bloodhound in Apex Legends, Mitsuru Kirijo in Persona 3 Reload, and Dorothea Arnault in Fire Emblem: Three Houses.

== Early life ==
Allegra Clark was born in New York City, on July 11, 1988. As a child, she acted in school plays and commercials in both English and French.

== Career ==
Since approximately 2009, Clark has been a dedicated fan of the Dragon Age series and other BioWare games; she credits being cast as Josephine in Dragon Age: Inquisition (released 2014) as her "big break" into the video game industry.

Her roles have included Maki Zen'in in Jujutsu Kaisen, Beidou in Genshin Impact, Josephine in Dragon Age: Inquisition, Princess Kakyuu in Sailor Moon, Dorothea and Shamir in Fire Emblem: Three Houses, Mitsuru Kirijo in Persona 3 Reload, Pitohui in Sword Art Online Alternative: Gun Gale Online, Cynthia in Pokémon Masters, the Demon Spider Mother and the younger version of Tanjiro Kamado in Demon Slayer: Kimetsu no Yaiba, Bloodhound in Apex Legends, and Acheron in Honkai: Star Rail.

== Personal life ==
According to her Twitter account, Clark identifies as a cisgender queer person. She is trilingual and currently resides in Los Angeles.

== Filmography ==
=== Anime ===
List of English dubbing performances in anime series and films
Year	Title	Role	Notes	Source
2017	Fate/Apocrypha	Atalante (Archer of Red), Semiramis (Assassin of Red), Reika Rikudou		
2017	Hunter × Hunter	Kurt, Zazan		
2018	Kakegurui	Miroslava Honebami, Kumagusu		
2018	B – The Beginning	Kaela Yoshinaga		
2018	Granblue Fantasy: The Animation	Rosetta, Black Knight, Gran (Young)		
2018	SWORDGAI: The Animation	Shoko, Wakaba		
2018	A.I.C.O. -Incarnation-	Haruka Seri		
2018	Aggretsuko	Puko		
2018	FLCL: Progressive	Jinyu		
2018	JoJo's Bizarre Adventure: Diamond Is Unbreakable	Tomoko Higashikata, Yoshie		
2018	Last Hope	Cecile Sue		
2018	Dragon Pilot: Hisone and Masotan	Moriyama		
2018	Maquia - When the Promised Flower Blooms	Mido		
2018	Beyblade Burst Turbo	Kana Akabane, Ange Lopez		
2018	The Seven Deadly Sins	Derieri, Matrona, Pelonia		
2018	Record of Grancrest War	Aishela		
2018	Sword Art Online Alternative: Gun Gale Online	Pitohui		
2018	Sirius the Jaeger	Agatha		
2018	Megalobox	Asamoto		
2018	Re:ZERO	Betelgeuse's Finger	Episode 22	
2018	Bungo Stray Dogs	Gin Akutagawa		
2019	KonoSuba	Sena		
2019	Carole & Tuesday	Marie		
2019	To the Abandoned Sacred Beasts	Elaine Bluelake		
2019	Sailor Moon Sailor Stars	Princess Kakyuu		
2019	Demon Slayer: Kimetsu no Yaiba	Spider Demon (Mother), Tanjiro Kamado (Young)		
2020	Magia Record: Puella Magi Madoka Magica Side Story	Mifuyu Azusa, Akira Shinobu		
2020	Pokémon: Twilight Wings	Sonia, Marnie's Morpeko		
2020	The Wonderland	Chii		
2020	The God of High School	Park Seungah		
2020	Detective Conan: The Darkest Nightmare	Curacao		
2020	Lord El-Melloi II's Case Files {Rail Zeppelin} Grace note	Reines El-Melloi Archisorte		
2020	I'm Standing on a Million Lives	Fatina		
2020-present	Jujutsu Kaisen	Maki Zen'in, Kasumi Miwa, Kaori Itadori		
2021	Cells at Work! Code Black	White Blood Cell (1196)		
2021	Burn the Witch	Noel Niihashi		
2021	The Promised Neverland	Rossi, Barbara		
2021	Kuroko's Basketball	Alex Garcia		
2021	Vivy: Fluorite Eye's Song	Elizabeth		
2021	Pretty Boy Detective Club	Kowako Towai		
2021	I've Been Killing Slimes for 300 Years and Maxed Out My Level	Vania		
2021	Edens Zero	Sister Ivry, Angelic Angela		
2021	Scarlet Nexus	Wakana Sumeragi		
2021	The Seven Deadly Sins: Cursed By Light	Matrona		
2021	Hortensia Saga	Vall d'Hebron's Mother, Diable		
2021	Vinland Saga	Ylva		
2022	Jujutsu Kaisen 0	Maki Zen'in, Kasumi Miwa		
2022	Fate/Grand Carnival	Atalante, Mysterious Alter Ego λ, Gilgamesh (Child)		
2023	Pokémon Journeys	Lyla, Lyla's Frosmoth		
2023	Suzume	Tsubame Iwato		
2023	The Seven Deadly Sins: Grudge of Edinburgh Part 2	Derieri		
2023	Zom 100: Bucket List of the Dead	Reika		
2023	Onimusha	Okyo, Omiya, Osae, Sayo's Mother, Female Innkeeper		
2023	Okamoto Kitchen OVA	Chef Chizuru		
2024	The Grimm Variations	Dog		
2024	Sailor Moon Cosmos	Sailor Kakyuu / Princess Kakyuu		
2024	Sword Art Online Alternative: Gun Gale Online II	Pitohui		
2024	Ranma ½	Kodachi Kuno		
2024	Mononoke the Movie: Phantom in the Rain	Mugitani		
2024	Dandadan	Hana, Queen-sensei		
2024	Sound! Euphonium	Haruka Ogasawara		
2024	The Seven Deadly Sins: Four Knights of the Apocalypse	Thetis		
2025	Blue Exorcist: Shimane Illuminati Saga	Tamamo Kamiki		
2025	Synduality: Noir	Claudia		
2025	Mobile Suit Gundam GQuuuuuuX	Kycilia Zabi		
2025	Tougen Anki	Yomogi Momokusa		
2025	Sakamoto Days	Rion Akao		
2025	Witch Watch	Keigo Magami (Young), Nemu's Mother		
2025	Sanda	Namatame's Mother, Toyo Tetsudome (Young)		
2026	SHIBOYUGI: Playing Death Games to Put Food on the Table	Mishiro		
2026	Kaya-chan Isn't Scary	Akira-sensei		
2026	That Time I Got Reincarnated as a Slime the Movie: Tears of the Azure Sea	Yura		
2026	Needy Girl Overdose	Additional voices		
2026	Grow Up Show: Sunflower Circus	Nanami Sumeragi		
2026	Welcome to Demon School! Iruma-kun	Gyari		

=== Other animation ===
List of voice performances in animation
Year	Title	Role	Notes	Source
2018	Lego Friends: Girls on a Mission	Mia		
2018	Space Chicken	Yayita		
2018	Shopkins: Wild	Mistabella		
2019	YooHoo to the Rescue	Spotee, Olivia		
2019	Rainbow Butterfly Unicorn Kitty	Felicity		
2020	Rise of the Teenage Mutant Ninja Turtles	CJ Girl, Brownie Girls		
2020	Dragon's Dogma	Elizabeth	Episode 3	
2023	Poor Devil	Gabi, Aunt Laura		
2023	Wake Up, Carlo!	Tatiana		
2024	Creature Commandos	Obstetrician, Lacross Girl		
TBA	PiRATs! (Emphasis on the 'Rat')	Sassparilla		

=== Video games ===
List of voice and English dubbing performances in video games
Year	Title	Role	Notes	Source
2014	Dragon Age: Inquisition	Josephine		
2016	Tyranny	Verse		
2017	Fire Emblem Heroes	Ethlyn, Karla, Dorothea, Shamir		
2017	Mass Effect: Andromeda	Nakmor Kesh		
2017	Fortnite	Azalea Clark		
2017	Cyberdimension Neptunia: 4 Goddesses Online	Kiria		
2017	From Other Suns	Additional voices		
2017	Friday the 13th: The Game	Victoria Sterling		
2017	Rumu	Sabrina		
2018	The Witch and the Hundred Knight 2	Lisa		
2018	BlazBlue: Cross Tag Battle	Hilda		
2018	Pillars of Eternity II: Deadfire	Modwyr, Fleet Master Okaya, Olesca Sarasso, Wael, Player Voice - Feisty Female		
2018	Death's Gambit	Ione, Nymeria		
2018	World of Warcraft: Battle for Azeroth	Lightforged Draenei NPC, Void Elf NPC, Sister Solena, Knight Captain Valyri		
2018	Labyrinth of Refrain: Coven of Dusk	Dronya		
2018	Fist of the North Star: Lost Paradise	Xsana		
2019	Smite	Deadly Desire Da Ji, Persephone		
2019	Seven Knights	Clemyth		
2019	Apex Legends	Bloodhound		
2019	God Eater 3	Hilda Henriquez		
2019	Death end re;Quest	Nova		
2019	Left Alive	Olga Sergeyevna Kalinina		
2019	Super Neptunia RPG	Artura Arrima		
2019	The Sinking City	Additional voices		
2019	Marvel Ultimate Alliance 3: The Black Order	Spider-Gwen		
2019	Fire Emblem: Three Houses	Dorothea, Shamir		
2019	Pokémon Masters EX	Cynthia		
2019	Astral Chain	Legatus		
2019	Daemon X Machina	Four, Nemesis		
2019	AI: The Somnium Files	Boss		
2019	Afterparty	Lutzelfrau, Malacoda, Additional Voices		
2019	Shenmue III	Additional voices		
2019	SaGa: Scarlet Grace - Ambitions	Elisabeth		
2020	Granblue Fantasy Versus	Rosetta		
2020	Eternal Return	Haze		
2020	The Last of Us Part II	Additional voices		
2020	Final Fantasy Crystal Chronicles Remastered Edition	Princess Fiona		
2020	Wasteland 3	Player Voice: Hardass Female		
2020	The Legend of Heroes: Trails of Cold Steel IV	Fiona Craig, The Grandmaster		
2020	Guardian Tales	Lupina, Vishuvac		
2020	13 Sentinels: Aegis Rim	Iori Fuyusaka		
2020	Star Wars: Squadrons	Player Voice: Gambler A		
2020	Medal of Honor: Above and Beyond	Walla		
2020	Genshin Impact	Beidou		
2021	The Outer Worlds: Murder on Eridanos	Halcyon Helen/Ruth Bellamy	Downloadable content	
2021	Shin Megami Tensei III: Nocturne	Pixie, Atropos, Nyx, Manikin Priestess		
2021	Scarlet Nexus	Wakana Sumeragi		
2021	Fallout 76: Steel Reign	Corporal Woods		
2021	Shadowverse	Silversteel Blader		
2021	Maneater: Truth Quest	NWO Soldier	Downloadable content	
2021	Lost Judgement	Takanashi, Seiryoin, Toribe, Bullied Girl		
2021	New World	Artificer Gomes, Commander Joshi, Juice the Bear		
2021	Death's Gambit: Afterlife	Ione, Aberrant AI, Gray Wanderer, Little Girl		
2021	Demon Slayer: Kimetsu no Yaiba – The Hinokami Chronicles	Mother Spider Demon, Young Tanjiro		
2021	Shin Megami Tensei V	Artemis, Titania		
2021	Arcadia Fallen	Victoria		
2021	NieR Re[in]carnation	Hina Akagi		
2022	Horizon Forbidden West	Additional voices		
2022	Rune Factory 5	Alice		
2022	AI: The Somnium Files – Nirvana Initiative	Boss		
2022	Fire Emblem Warriors: Three Hopes	Dorothea, Shamir		
2022	Red Matter 2	A.I.		
2023	Seven Knights 2	Clemyth		
2023	Redemption Reapers	Karren		
2023	Omega Strikers	Asher		
2023	Shadowverse	Verdilia	Lessons from Lainecrest story chapter	
2023	Arknights	Dorothy, Proviso, Penance		
2023	Cassette Beasts	Amber, Clemence		
2023	Outerplane	Valentine, Claire		
2023	Street Fighter 6	Marisa, Blue Mary		
2023	The Legend of Heroes: Trails into Reverie	Mireille, The Grandmaster		
2023	Saints Row: Doc Ketchum's Murder Circus	Female Generic 2, Female Soldier	Downloadable content	
2023	Stray Gods: The Roleplaying Musical	Hecate		
2023	Grand Cross: Age of Titans	Eren		
2023	Goodbye Volcano High	Naomi		
2023	Starfield	Monika Blum, Isa Mellant		
2023	Silent Hope	Warrior		
2023	Aether Gazer	Heimdall		
2023	Exploding Kittens: A Pinball Cat-Astrophe	Opponent	Downloadable content	
2023	Granblue Fantasy Versus: Rising	Rosetta		
2024	Granblue Fantasy: Relink	Rosetta		
2024	Jujutsu Kaisen: Cursed Clash	Maki Zen'in, Kasumi Miwa		
2024	Persona 3 Reload	Mitsuru Kirijo		
2024	Honkai: Star Rail	Acheron		
2024	Final Fantasy VII Rebirth	Ifalna		
2024	Unicorn Overlord	Liza, Ilenia		
2024	Fallout 76: America's Playground	Carly Day, additional voices		
2024	Sand Land	Additional voices		
2024	The Elder Scrolls Online: The Gold Road	Votary Nahlia, Malaniel, Phythia		
2024	Shin Megami Tensei V: Vengeance	Eisheth Zenunim, Konohana Sakuya		
2024	Zenless Zone Zero	Fairy		
2024	Zenless Zone Zero	Cecilia		
2024	The Legend of Heroes: Trails Through Daybreak	Lucrezia Isselee, Holo Core Voices		
2024	Path to Nowhere	000		
2024	League of Legends	Buybot the Piltover Shopkeeper	"Bridge of Progress" area	
2025	Synduality: Echo of Ada	Nana, Claudia, LY-α-14		
2025	The Legend of Heroes: Trails Through Daybreak II	Lucrezia Isselee		
2025	Avowed	Captain Aelfyr, Ruanga, Wael, Ward of the Eye, Martella, Belenna		
2025	MementoMori	Rustica		
2025	FragPunk	Pathojen		
2025	Cookie Run: Kingdom	Wedding Cake Cookie		
2025	WWE 2K25	Female Player Voice		
2025	Dark Deity 2	Rashida		
2025	Rusty Rabbit	Facility Announcement		
2025	Lost Eidolons: Veil of the Witch	Sable		
2025	Fatal Fury: City of the Wolves	Blue Mary		
2025	Section 13	Violet		
2025	Scar-Lead Salvation	Willow Martin		
2025	Crystal of Atlan	Lan the Fighter		
2025	The Elder Scrolls Online: Seasons of the Worm Cult	Additional voices		
2025	Yakuza 0 Director's Cut	Ai Uehara		
2025	Rune Factory: Guardians of Azuma	Kanata		
2025	Dune: Awakening	Beatriz Luna, Symphasia Rai		
2025	Shadowverse: Worlds Beyond	Salefa, Guardian of Water		
2025	Date Everything!	Tydus Andromache		
2025	No Sleep for Kaname Date – From AI: The Somnium Files	Boss		
2025	Arena of Valor	Goverra		
2025	Story of Seasons: Grand Bazaar	Sherene		
2025	Destiny: Rising	Attal		
2025	Everybody's Golf Hot Shots	Eskaterina		
2025	Towa and the Guardians of the Sacred Tree	Origami		
2025	Pac-Man World 2 Re-Pac	Nova, Clie		
2025	Blade & Soul Heroes	Sehwa		
2025	Digimon Story: Time Stranger	Inori Misono		
2025	Double Dragon Revive	Linda Embers		
2025	The Outer Worlds 2	Aza		
2025	Hyrule Warriors: Age of Imprisonment	Lenalia		
2026	Code Vein II	Lavinia Voda		
2026	Monster Hunter Stories 3: Twisted Reflection	Kol		
2026	Neverness to Everness	Hathor		
2026	The Adventures of Elliot: The Millennium Tales	Lyudmila		
2026	Granblue Fantasy: Relink - Endless Ragnarok	Rosetta	Downloadable content	
2026	Disgaea Mayhem	Kory, Ghost, Clawdette, Spitfire Monsters		
2026	Halloween: The Game	Jennifer Aarons		
2026	Marvel's Wolverine	Additional voices		
