= Divided We Stand (disambiguation) =

"Divided We Stand" is word play on the motto "united we stand, divided we fall".

Divided We Stand may also refer to:

== Film and television ==
- "Divided We Stand", a season 2 episode of M*A*S*H
- "Divided We Stand", a season 1 episode of Star Trek Continues
- "Divided We Stand", a season 4 episode of Ben 10
- "Divided We Stand", a season 7 episode of McLeod's Daughters
- "Divided We Stand", a season 4 episode of Small Wonder
- "Divided We Stand", a season 7 episode of Steptoe & Son
- "Divided We Stand", a season 2 episode of Monkey Thieves
- "Divided We Stand", a season 2 episode of Shadow Raiders
- "Divided We Stand", a season 1 episode of Space Precinct
- Divided We Stand, a 1988 television pilot by Aaron Spelling

== Literature ==
- X-Men: Divided We Stand, a 2008 comic book storyline published by Marvel Comics

== Music ==
- Divided We Stand (album), a 2003 album by T.S.O.L.
- "Divided We Stand", a song on the 2010 album Absolute Power by Pro-Pain
- "Divided We Stand", a song on the 2013 album We All Fall Down by Strange Music
- "Divided We Stand", a song on the 1981 album Unsung Heroes by Dixie Dregs

== See also ==
- United We Stand (disambiguation)
- Divided We Fall (disambiguation)
- United We Fall (disambiguation)
