= United We Fall =

"United We Fall" is word play on the motto "united we stand, divided we fall".

United We Fall may also refer to:

== Music ==
- United We Fall (album), a 2005 album by Canadian hip hop group Sweatshop Union
- "United We Fall", a song on the Torment album by Zoogz Rift
- "United We Fall", a song on the End of Disclosure album by Swedish death metal band Hypocrisy
- "United We Fall", a song on the Revolt album by The Dreams
- "United We Fall", a song written by Mick Moss

== Film and television ==
- United We Fall, a 2014 film by Gary Sinyor
- United We Fall (TV series), an American television sitcom
- "United We Fall", an episode from series 8 of the UK series Casualty
- "United We Fall", an episode of Ink (TV series)

== Literature ==
- United We Fall: Boardroom Truths About the Beautiful Game, a 2007 book by Peter Ridsdale
- United We Fall: The Crisis of Democracy in Canada, a 1993 book by Susan Delacourt
- UNITed We Fall, a Doctor Who short story by Keith DeCandido printed in Decalog 3: Consequences

== See also ==
- United We Stand (disambiguation)
- Divided We Fall (disambiguation)
- Divided We Stand (disambiguation)
