= United We Stand =

United We Stand may refer to:

- "United we stand, divided we fall", a motto

== Film ==
- United We Stand (1986 film), a Hong Kong film directed by Kent Cheng
- United We Stand (2003 film), an Italian English-language documentary directed by Matteo Barzini

== Music ==
- United We Stand (Brad album), 2012
- United We Stand (Brotherhood of Man album), 1970
  - "United We Stand" (song), the title song
- United We Stand (Debby and Glen Campbell album), 1995
- United We Stand (Hillsong United album), 2006
- United We Stand: What More Can I Give, a 2001 benefit concert

== Sports ==
- United We Stand SC, a US Virgin Islands soccer club
- Impact Wrestling United We Stand, a 2019 professional wrestling event

== Other uses ==
- United We Stand America, a U.S. political movement, 1992–1995
- United We Stand (novel), a 2009 novel by Eric Walters

== See also ==
- Divided We Fall, United We Stand, an event in the Marvel Comics series Ultimate Comics: The Ultimates
- Divided We Fall (disambiguation)
- United We Fall (disambiguation)
- Divided We Stand (disambiguation)
