= Dark Deity 2 =

2025 video game

- Developers: Sword & Axe LLC
- Publisher: indie.io
- Directors: Chip Moore; Dylan Takeyama
- Engine: GameMaker
- Platforms: Windows; macOS; Nintendo Switch; PlayStation 5; Xbox Series X/S
- Release: March 24, 2025: Windows, macOS; March 24, 2025; Nintendo Switch; September 4, 2025; PlayStation 5, Xbox Series X/S; November 7, 2025
- Genre: Tactical role-playing

Dark Deity 2 is a tactical role-playing game developed by Sword & Axe LLC and published by indie.io. A sequel to the 2021 game Dark Deity, it was released for Windows and macOS on March 24, 2025, and was later released for Nintendo Switch, PlayStation 5, and Xbox Series X/S. Set 25 years after the events of the previous game, the story follows the next generation of heroes as they defend the land of Verroa from an invasion by the Holy Asverellian Empire.

== Gameplay ==
Dark Deity 2 is a single-player tactical role-playing game. The player controls a squad of units of the "Order of Eternals" in a series of battles as the plot advances; there are also optional training and challenge battles if the player wishes to further strengthen their team. New characters regularly join the team as the game progresses. Characters have their own personal starting statistics (stats), stat growth rates, and set of accessible classes to choose from. The chosen class affects the weapons available and their ranges, stat growth rates, and skills available. Skills can be upgraded and customized by spending resources. Equipment is also customizable, with weapons able to be modified with runes for a variety of boosts, and unique accessory rings can be crafted to grant more specialized bonuses to the character equipped with the ring.

In battle, characters are maneuvered around a grid-based field. The flow of the game is turn-based; the game alternates between a player phase where player units move and act, and an enemy phase where hostile units move and act. The maps feature a variety of pathways and obstructions. Some terrain grants defensive bonuses, such as boosts to evasion or defense. A variety of optional side objectives are available on maps; completing them rewards the player with bonus items or money. They often involve visiting specific locations or using certain abilities.

Characters can engage in combat with foes, with the stats of the characters and their equipped weapons compared for determining damage, accuracy, and chance for a critical hit. The defending unit can counterattack if their weapon's range matches the distance of the engagement. A unit's weapon is fixed at the start of the map, so range is reliable and does not vary. On their own phase, characters can also choose to use special skills when attacking, with the skills coming from the classes they're in or have mastered previously. These offensive skills provide a variety of effects and bonuses, but cost MP; MP starts at 100 and regenerates 20 MP a turn by default. Some skills also have indirect utility and provide healing, stat buffs, movement bonuses, and indirect damage without combat. All maps have a time limit to encourage bold advance and discourage stalling strategies involving letting MP slowly regenerate. If a character is defeated in battle, they are removed from the map, and are given a random debuff on the next map to represent their wound. If Gwyn is defeated, the map is lost, and the player must restart. Characters deployed together and who fight nearby can gain bond ranks with each other, which unlocks support conversations and minor item rewards.

There are several difficulty modes and settings. Easier settings reduce enemy stats, while harder settings have stronger enemies. On the hardest setting, any player unit defeat is considered a game over. The map turn limits can also be disabled for players seeking a more relaxed pace. Stat growths can be adjusted as well, such as to a fixed growths setting that removes the element of randomness. Character recruitment can also be randomized, allowing late-joining characters in a normal playthrough to potentially show up earlier.

The series pays homage to the Fire Emblem series, although there are a few differences. Enemies cannot get critical hits on player units, and movement ranges are much more standardized around infantry. Compared to the first Dark Deity, weakness-hitting is less of an emphasis, and experience gain is more scaled, discouraging strategies that eschew team-building to build one powerful unit.

== Plot ==
Gwyn, Riordan, and Arthur Sildairan are members of the Order of Eternals; their father Irving was the protagonist of the events of the first Dark Deity, which was 25 years ago at the point where Dark Deity 2 is set. Irving has since become Grandmaster of the Order. They are investigating hidden magical artifacts when a border dispute turns into an invasion from the nearby Asverellian Empire. Together, they seek to understand the threat to the continent of Verroa and other mysterious magical disturbances by traveling and making alliances, despite the Order's stated aversion to engaging directly in wars and national struggles.

In the course of the game, there are several split-path missions that require a choice from the player. Choosing which side to aid adjusts the alliances the Order of Eternals gains as the story proceeds.

== Development and release ==
Dark Deity 2 was created using the GameMaker suite.

It released over Steam for Windows and macOS on March 24, 2025. It released for Nintendo Switch on September 4, 2025, and released for PlayStation 5 and Xbox Series X/S on November 7, 2025.

== Reception ==
Dark Deity 2 received "generally favorable" reviews according to review aggregator Metacritic.

Graham Russell of Siliconera praised the game and scored it an 8/10, writing that it had both stronger writing and stronger gameplay than the first Dark Deity. He complimented the sprite work as good and the maps as better-looking, although he thought certain elements could have used a little more polishing before release.

Audra Bowling of RPGFan praised the character work, saying that the core trio of Gwyn, Riordan, and Arthur were strong characters, and their uncle Alden (from the first Dark Deity) was a surprising stand-out as well. She only thought it odd that the bond conversations between characters were optional, as she thought some of them were important enough to the plot that they should have been mandatory. She also appreciated the variety of difficulty modes and customization options the game gives players. She thought that navigating the out-of-battle interface for army and equipment management could have been made easier and clearer, though. She gave the game a 91/100 overall.

Ryan Costa of RPGamer appreciated the use of side objectives as making maps feel memorable and different, rather than blurring into "defeat all enemies" or "defeat a boss enemy." He also praised the spritework as crisp and detailed. He gave the game a 3.5/5, saying it was a polished tactical RPG experience, but also a touch safe and not particularly innovative.

Thiago de Alencar Moura of PSX Brasil liked that the plot stood on its own well enough, with knowledge of the first Dark Deity largely optional. He thought it easily surpassed the original game. He did note that the secondary characters don't tend to have long-running character arcs – most are introduced and have a few chapters of plot relevance, but are then largely forgotten about and become pure gameplay pieces. He praised the strong map design and character customization options as giving the game depth and replayability, and scored it a 90% overall.
