= Dorothea Arnault =

- Fire Emblem character
- Dorothea Arnault in Fire Emblem: Three Houses
- First game: Fire Emblem: Three Houses (2019)
- Designed by: Chinatsu Kurahana
- Voiced by: EN: Allegra Clark; JA: Juri Nagatsuma

In-universe information
- Affiliation: Black Eagles

Dorothea Arnault (Japanese: ドロテア＝アールノルト, Hepburn: Dorotea Ārunoruto) is a character in the 2019 video game Fire Emblem: Three Houses. She is a student of the Officers Academy at Garreg Mach Monastery and a member of the Black Eagles student house, led by Edelgard von Hresvelg. She is a flirtatious singer and dancer, having become an orphan as a child and growing up as a commoner. This has led her to seek out a wealthy partner to support her. She was designed by character designer Chinatsu Kurahana, and was voiced by Juri Nagatsuma and Allegra Clark in Japanese and English, respectively, the latter finding her relatable due to their similar personalities.

Dorothea has received generally positive reception, at one time considered the favorite character to use in Three Houses. She has been praised for her sexuality and personality, with her relationships with characters like Petra Macneary and Edelgard receiving commentary.

== Appearances ==
Dorothea first appeared in the 2019 video game Fire Emblem: Three Houses. In this game, she is a student of the Officers Academy at Garreg Mach Monastery and a member of the Black Eagles, led by fellow student Edelgard von Hresvelg. She is skilled in the use of magic such as healing spells, and can develop relationships with various characters, including Edelgard von Hresvelg, Petra Macneary, and the protagonist, Byleth. She is seeking a rich partner who can support her later in life. Dorothea is available to players who join the Black Eagles by default, though if the player chooses to teach either the Blue Lions or Golden Deer instead, she can be recruited to those houses by meeting certain requirements. If she is not recruited before the end of the Academy Phase, she will fight for the Adrestian Empire in a war waged by Edelgard to unite Fódlan under her rule and destroy the Crest system.

Dorothea is also playable in Fire Emblem Warriors: Three Hopes, a spin-off game that depicts an alternate scenario in the same setting as Three Houses, premised on the idea that Byleth never became a professor at Garreg Mach. Dorothea also appears in Fire Emblem Heroes as a playable character in various incarnations, including a Summer version and a Christmas version.

== Concept and creation ==
Dorothea was designed for Fire Emblem: Three Houses by character designer Chinatsu Kurahana. She is an opera singer and dancer who likes to flirt with people, seeking a partner to support her in her old age. She is also bisexual. Dorothea also grew up as a commoner, having been orphaned as a child. Dorothea is voiced by Juri Nagatsuma in Japanese and Allegra Clark in English. Clark identified Dorothea as a character she can relate to more easily, due to Dorothea being closer to her own personality. She identified emotive characters as easier for her to get into. Clark discussed how, while voicing Dorothea, she experienced bitterness for the injustices she faced, with voice directors telling her to dial it back and make her more composed. Clark, who also voices Shamir Nevrand, discussed how voicing two characters in one game was both flattering and yet intimidating, noting that Shamir was always on her mind when voicing Dorothea due to wanting to avoid them sounding too similar. She also discussed how Shamir and Dorothea represent two different sides of her personality.

== Reception ==
Dorothea has received generally positive reception. At one time, she was the most-used character in the game; Destructoid writer Chris Carter discussed that he used her often, calling her one of his favorite party members due in part to how enjoyable she was to talk to. Polygon writer Patricia Hernandez felt that this popularity was due to her attractiveness, noting that while it's subjective, her design felt deliberate on Intelligent Systems' part. Despite this, she felt that her personality was a strong factor in her popularity as well. talking about how her class consciousness surrounding her desire to find a rich partner defines her interactions with other characters. She appreciated how she stood up for herself against nobles who didn't have to work to get where they're at, or those who looked down on her, The Gamer writer Stacey Henley discussed how Dorothea's design contrasted Bernadetta's in the pre-timeskip section of the game. She discussed how, where Bernadetta is disheveled, Dorothea has to look her best due to her relative lack of money, as well as how her history with the opera house informs her outfit. Kotaku writer Maddy Myers identified the paralogue between Dorothea and Ingrid as one of her favorites, calling its story "surprisingly touching" and feeling that the two characters she became more attached to as a result. Fellow Kotaku writer Gita Jackson appreciated her support conversations, calling her "sweet" and "sincere".

TechRadar writer V.S. Wells felt that Three Houses mishandled bisexuality, noting how despite Dorothea being bisexual, she has far more romantic relationships with men than women, arguing that this makes it feel like an afterthought. Gayming Mag writer Aimee Hart, however, praised Three Hopes for embracing Dorothea's bisexuality; particularly, she appreciated the fact that the game changed her from seeking a husband to seeking either a husband or a wife. She felt that this was not particularly surprising to those who knew her, but was nonetheless noted the significance of the change.

Relationships between Dorothea and other characters have received discussion. When discussing the most popular Three Houses ship fanfiction on Archive of Our Own, Gayming Mag writer Aimee Hart regarded the relationship between Dorothea and Petra as one of her favorites, while considering it an underrated relationship. She discussed the appeal of them being their shared struggles, and how despite this, they open up to one another. Hart also praised the relationship between Dorothea and Edelgard, appreciating how Dorothea's familiarity with Edelgard showed a softer side of Edelgard. Fanbyte writer Ib hunktears also held their relationship in high esteem, appreciating how romantic their conversations are, and how the mutual benefit of Dorothea finding someone who respects her and Edelgard finds someone she can be herself around her. The Mary Sue writer Princess Weekes expressed surprise that the ship between Dorothea and Petra was not higher.
