= The Liberty Song =

Early American patriotic song

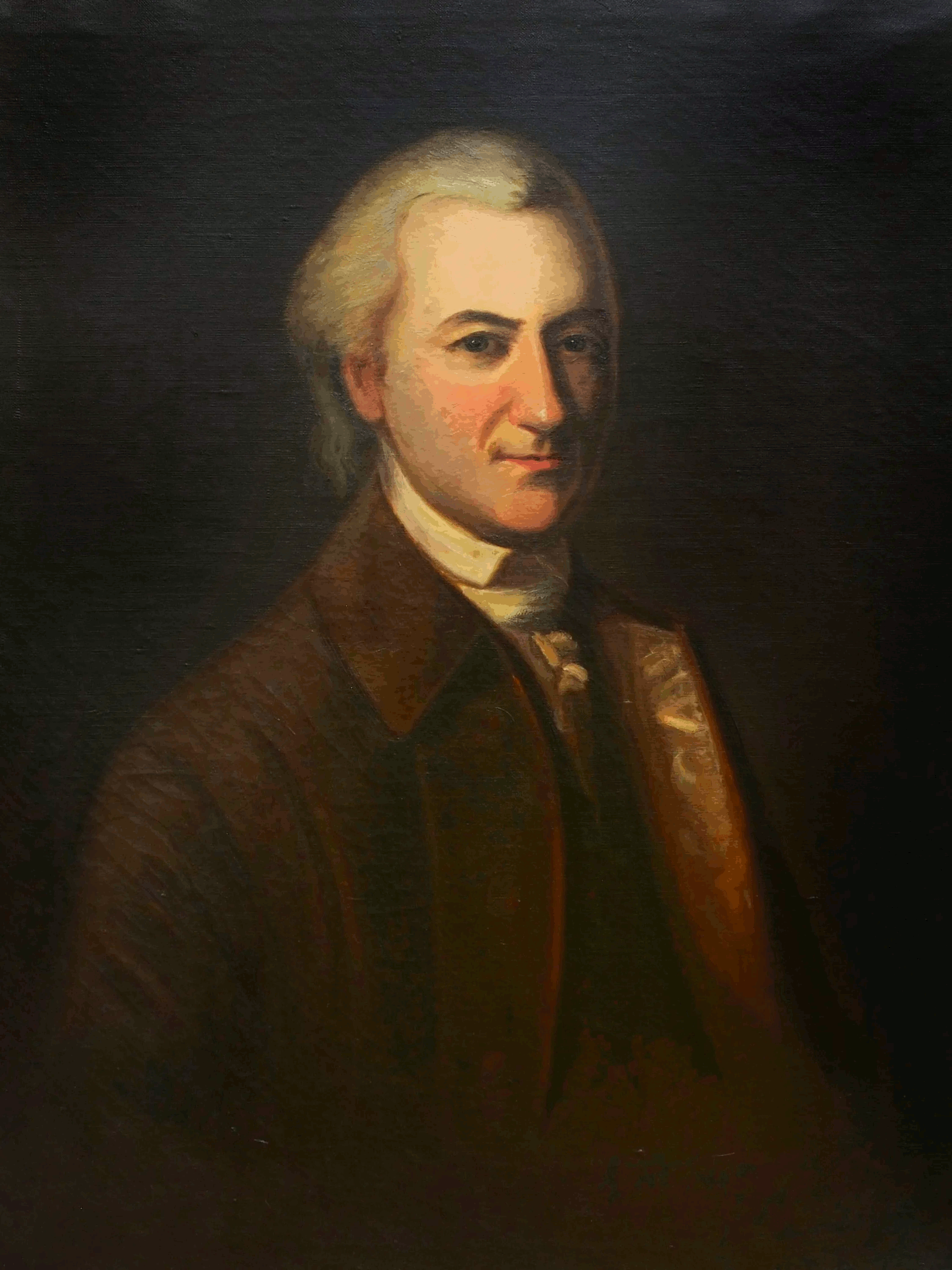
John Dickinson, the song's author

"The Liberty Song" is a 1768 song written by American Founding Father John Dickinson. It was written following the publication of the Circular Letter condemning the Townshend Acts. The song's tune was pulled from the British song "Heart of Oak". "The Liberty Song" was incredibly popular throughout its first few months, and received an anonymous British parody version. This parody was then parodied by Dr. Benjamin Church. The song's lyrics contain the first modern appearance of the phrase "United we stand, divided we fall".

== Origins and publication ==
Backlash against the Townshend Acts was substantial in Colonial America. In May 1768, the sloop Liberty was seized in Boston by the city's new British commander of customs. The sloop was owned by John Hancock and was taken on suspicion of smuggling. A mob drove the commissioner and his agents from Boston to Castle William, in Boston Harbor. The colonial governor of Massachusetts asked for help from British troops who were stationed in Halifax. The Massachusetts Legislature refused to rescind the Circular Letter that was written by Samuel Adams and James Otis in protest of the Townshend Acts. Two of the song's verses were supplied by Arthur Lee of Virginia, whom he called a "worthy friend".

On July 4, Dickinson sent the song to Otis. The song was then published in the July 18 edition of the Boston Gazette. Of this original song, no versions survive. Dickinson sent another letter to Otis on July 6, saying he had written the first song in "great haste" and thought it was "too bold". He requested the song to be re-published with an additional stanza between the fourth and fifth. The second version was published as a broadside ballad by Hall and Sellers in Philadelphia, to the tune of "Heart of Oak". "Heart of Oak" was a song written in 1759 by the English composer William Boyce, celebrating British successes in the Seven Years' War.

== Parodies ==
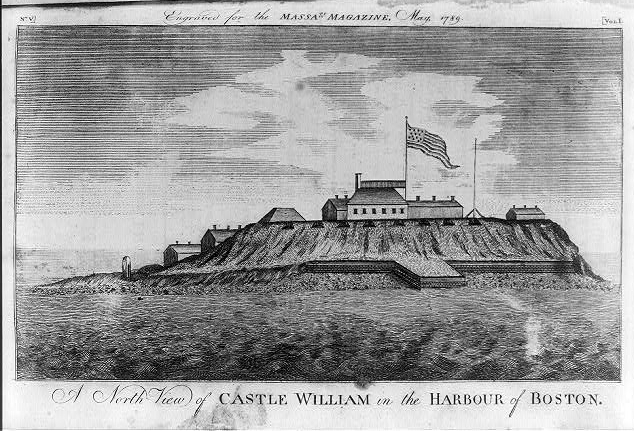
An illustration of Castle William from a 1789 edition of the Massachusetts Magazine

During its wide circulation from July to September, the song frustrated British loyalists. An unknown author published a song to the tune of "Heart of Oak" that was titled "The Parody". The song was printed on September 26, with an attached notice that it had come from "a garret at Castle William" the previous Tuesday. The song was directed against the patriots, describing them "not as men, but as monkeys" and saying they'd live in folly.

Dr. Benjamin Church, in turn, published a version in the Boston Gazette on October 3. This version was published as "The Parody Parodiz'd", or the "Massachusetts Liberty Song", without any music. A version of it also appeared in Bickerstaff’s Boston Almanack of 1770 with altered lyrics.

== Lyrics ==
=== 1768 republished version ===
Come, join hand in hand, brave Americans all,
And rouse your bold hearts at fair Liberty's call;
No tyrannous acts shall suppress your just claim,
Or stain with dishonor America's name.

Chorus:
In Freedom we're born and in Freedom we'll live.
Our purses are ready. Steady, friends, steady;
Not as slaves, but as Freemen our money we'll give.

Our worthy forefathers, let's give them a cheer,
To climates unknown did courageously steer;
Through oceans to deserts for Freedom they came,
And dying, bequeath'd us their freedom and fame

Chorus

How sweet are the labors that free men endure,
That men shall enjoy the sweet profit secure.
No more sweet labors Americans know,
If British shall reap what Americans sow.

Chorus

Their generous bosoms all dangers despis'd,
So highly, so wisely, their Birthrights they priz'd;
We'll keep what they gave, we will piously keep,
Nor frustrate their toils on the land and the deep.

Chorus

The tree their own hands had to Liberty rear'd;
They lived to behold growing strong and revered;
With transport they cried, "Now our wishes we gain,
For our children shall gather the fruits of our pain."

Chorus

Swarms of placemen and pensioners soon will appear
Like locusts deforming the charms of the year;
Suns vainly will rise, showers vainly descend,
If we are to drudge for what others shall spend.

Chorus

Then join hand in hand, brave Americans all,
By uniting we stand, by dividing we fall;
In so righteous a cause let us hope to succeed,
For heaven approves of each generous deed.

Chorus

All ages shall speak with amaze and applause,
Of the courage we'll show in support of our Laws;
To die we can bear, but to serve we disdain.
For shame is to Freedom more dreadful than pain.

Chorus

This bumper I crown for our Sovereign's health,
And this for Britannia's glory and wealth;
That wealth and that glory immortal may be,
If She is but Just, and if we are but Free.

Chorus

=== 1770 version ===
Come swallow your bumpers, ye Tories, and roar,
That the sons of fair freedom are hampered once more;
But know that no cut-throats our spirits can tame,
Nor a host of oppressors shall smother the flame.

Chorus:
In Freedom we're born, and, like sons of the brave,
Will never surrender, But swear to defend her;
And scorn to survive, if unable to save.
