= Superbeat: Xonic =

2015 video game

- North American cover
- Developer: Nurijoy
- Publishers: KOR: SCEK; NA: PM Studios, Atlus & Acttil; EU: Rising Star Games; AU: Mindscape; JP: Arc System Works
- Engine: Unity
- Platforms: Nintendo Switch, PlayStation 4, PlayStation Vita, Xbox One
- Release: PlayStation Vita: KOR: October 22, 2015; NA: November 10, 2015; EU: November 10, 2015; AU: December 10, 2015; JP: December 17, 2015; PlayStation 4: NA: June 6, 2017; EU: June 9, 2017; Xbox One: WW: June 7, 2017; Nintendo Switch: NA: November 21, 2017; EU: November 30, 2017; JP: October 3, 2019
- Genres: Music, rhythm
- Mode: Single-player

Superbeat: Xonic (Korean: 슈퍼비트: 소닉) is a 2015 rhythm game for the PlayStation Vita; PlayStation 4, Xbox One and Nintendo Switch as Superbeat: Xonic EX in 2017 developed by Nurijoy, a company formed by former employees of Pentavision. The game is published by Sony Computer Entertainment Korea in South Korea, in Japan, PM Studios in conjunction with Acttil in North America, and by Rising Star Games in Europe with a release date of Q4 2015 worldwide. It is considered a spiritual successor to the DJMax music game series and its gameplay is based on the 2014 arcade game Beatcraft Cyclon, also made by Nurijoy.

== Gameplay ==
The gameplay of Superbeat: Xonic consists of tapping notes to the beat of a song, either with the PlayStation Vita's face buttons or touchscreen. Modes, in order of difficulty, include 4 TRAX mode, 6 TRAX, and 6 TRAX FX. When selecting any mode, 3 tracks are played in succession and the player's performance is evaluated at the end. Local scores can be uploaded to a global online leaderboard if connected to the internet.

Superbeat features over 50 different tracks from a variety of genres, including soulful house, RnB, indie pop, progressive metal, and big beat and many more, and will include a collection of original music from producers such as 3rd Coast, ND Lee, Tsukasa and others.

The World Tour mode consists of a series of missions that are unlocked as the player advances in level. Each mission requires the player to play one or more songs while accomplishing certain goals. The missions are set in fourteen nightclubs located across the world.

== Development ==
Superbeat: Xonic was announced in March 2015, with a western release later confirmed in June 2015. The game's North American publisher, PM Studios, was previously involved with the release of DJMax Fever. According to CEO Michael Yum, the decision to release the game on the Vita platform was based on fan feedback. The game is compatible with the PlayStation TV.

The Nintendo Switch version was released on 23 December 2017.

== Reception ==
Reception

Aggregate score
Aggregator	Score
Metacritic	(PSV) 81/100 (XONE) 78/100 (NS) 74/100

Review scores
Publication	Score
Destructoid	7/10
Nintendo Life	8/10
Nintendo World Report	7/10
Push Square	8/10

Superbeat: Xonic received generally favorable reviews from critics.
