= Milkmaid of the Milky Way =

2017 video game

- Developer: Mattis Folkestad
- Designer: Mattis Folkestad
- Programmer: Mattis Folkestad
- Artist: Mattis Folkestad
- Writer: Mattis Folkestad
- Platforms: iOS, Android, Windows, macOS
- Release: January 5, 2017
- Genre: Adventure

Milkmaid of the Milky Way is an independent adventure game for iOS, Android, Windows, and macOS. It was developed by Mattis "machineboy" Folkestad and released on January 5, 2017. The game's plot features a Scandinavian milkmaid, Ruth, who loses her cows to a spacecraft, and has to jump aboard to save them.

== Plot ==
The puzzle adventure game takes place in space and in 1920s Norway. The main character is Ruth, a milkmaid living alone with her cows on a farm in a Nordic fjord in the 1920s. The game's story begins with Ruth doing tasks and chores on her farm, longing for a different life after the mysterious disappearance of her mother and death of her father. Then a spaceship flies overhead and abducts her cows from a field. Ruth has to get on the wing of the ship as it flies away, and figures out how to get inside to rescue her friends the cows. Later gameplay involves an intergalactic feud involving an oppressive monarch, and other characters such as an oracle, and space cows.

== Gameplay ==
The game is a point-and-click adventure game.” Players start by exploring the farm and surrounding area, encountering various challenges and puzzles. The game allows both running and walking speed. Early tasks include milking cows, patching the roof, making cheese, and also rescuing a lost cow. Puzzle solving is used to get through obstacles, not leveling up, and the skills learned in the first day are useful later on in the game. In between gameplay, there are also animated video clips to move the story along. On day two, the game becomes a science fiction venture concerning alien situations. When a spaceship abducts Ruth’s cows, Ruth has to get on the wing of the ship as it flies away and figure out how to get inside.

== Development ==
The game was independently developed by Mattis "machineboy" Folkestad, a developer in Oslo, Norway. He got illustrator Natalie Foss to make the cover. He worked on the project over two years, in his free time while also working a full-time job. The game was initially released for iOS. In January 2017, this was followed by a release for Steam (for Windows and Mac) and Apple's Mac App Store. It only came out for Android on May 18, 2017. The soundtrack is available on iTunes.

While the images are done in a pixelated style, the backgrounds are hand-painted with a pastel color palette. The game is completely written in rhyme, and is available in English, French, and Norwegian.

== Reception ==
Reception

Aggregate score
Aggregator	Score
Metacritic	iOS: 77/100; PC: 74/100

Review scores
Publication	Score
Adventure Gamers	3.5/5
Pocket Gamer	4/5
TouchArcade	4/5

The Microsoft Windows version of the game was given a score of 74 out of 100 by Metacritic, a review aggregation website. Adventure Gamers praised its story, but complained about the rhyming and lack of hints, giving it 3.5 out of 5 stars overall. Stuff.tv gave it 4/5 stars, stating the script had moments like a Douglas Adams story, and the “entire project feels like a concise, modern take on a classic Lucasfilm game.” Gamezebo thought it was “charmingly retro.”

iDigitalTimes gave it 5/5, saying that it was “already a strong contender for one of the best mobile games of 2017,” because of its “engaging storyline, beautiful graphics and clever gameplay.” Macworld thought that “everything about Milkmaid of the Milky Way has clearly been carefully designed, and the result is gorgeous.” Also, Pocket Gamer gave the game the “Pocket Game Silver Award."
