= Elliot Quest =

2014 video game

- Developer: Ansimuz Games
- Publisher: Ansimuz Games
- Designer: Luis Zuno
- Platforms: Windows, OS X, Linux, Ouya, Fire TV, Nintendo 3DS, Switch, Wii U, PlayStation 4, Xbox One
- Release: Windows: WW: 2014; Wii U: NA: March 19, 2015; JP: March 23, 2015; EU: April 16, 2015; AU: April 7, 2016; PlayStation 4: WW: May 9, 2017; Xbox One: WW: May 11, 2017; Nintendo 3DS: NA: May 11, 2017; EU: May 11, 2017; Switch: WW: October 19, 2017
- Genres: Platform, Metroidvania
- Mode: Single-player

Elliot Quest is a side-scrolling action-adventure platform game by Mexican developer Ansimuz Games. It was released for Microsoft Windows in 2014, followed shortly by a Wii U port in 2015, and later to other platforms throughout 2017. It is similar to such games as Metroid, Castlevania II: Simon's Quest, and Zelda II: The Adventure of Link.

== Plot ==
The demon Satar has placed a curse on Elliot, which will turn him into a demon as well if it is not lifted; Elliot sets out to search for a cure.

== Gameplay ==
Elliot Quest is a side-scrolling action-adventure game, with a top-down overworld connecting the various areas. At the beginning of the game, Elliot can do little but run, jump, and shoot arrows, but as he acquires new items and gains experience, he will gain new abilities, i.e., double jumping, bouncing off enemies, etc. These powers will let him access new places in the world. There are also towns in which Elliot can talk to NPCs for hints, which are usually cryptic.

== Development ==
The game was originally developed in HTML5, which made the game playable on the PC and Wii U platforms, with the latter supported via the Nintendo Web Framework. The source code was ultimately ported to a C++ base, making it playable on other platforms.

== Reception ==
Reception

Aggregate score
Aggregator	Score
Metacritic	(Wii U) 76/100 (NS) 73/100

Review scores
Publication	Score
Nintendo Life	8/10
Nintendo World Report	9/10
Digitally Downloaded.net	3/5
Nintendojo	A+
Arcade Sushi	8/10

Elliot Quest received generally positive reviews from critics. Nintendojo gave it an A+, its highest possible score, and concluded that "Elliot Quest offers one of the most entertaining and rewarding experiences an adventure game can offer." Nintendo World Report scored it 8/10 and called it a "tremendous game that, if you have any affinity for aspects of Zelda II and Metroid games, is something you should be getting as soon as possible." Arcade Sushi awarded the game 8/10, saying, "There's no doubt that Elliot Quest is an homage to games like Zelda 2 and Castlevania, but there's also a lot of originality here, especially in the game's narrative." Digitally Downloaded.net was less enthusiastic, saying, giving the game 3/5 stars and saying, "It does just enough to build on the game it lifts its template from (Zelda 2: The Adventure of Link), but at the same time it fails to push the modern retro genre into modernity as games like Shovel Knight and Rogue Legacy have."
