= Troll and I =

2017 video game

- Developer: Spiral House
- Publisher: Maximum Games
- Platforms: PlayStation 4, Windows, Xbox One, Nintendo Switch
- Release: PlayStation 4, Windows, & Xbox One: NA: 21 March 2017; PAL: 24 March 2017; Nintendo Switch: WW: 15 August 2017
- Genre: Action-adventure
- Modes: Single-player, multiplayer

Troll and I is an action-adventure video game developed by Spiral House and published by Maximum Games for PlayStation 4, Windows, Xbox One, and Nintendo Switch.

== Plot ==
A young boy named Otto forms a bond with a giant troll which is being pursued by a merciless hunter. It is set in a post-World War II Scandinavia.

== Gameplay ==
The troll is capable of powerful attacks that can defeat enemies with a single blow, whilst Otto relies on lighter and more nimble attacks. The two need to work together to solve puzzles. It includes local split-screen multiplayer.

== Development ==
The game was originally going to be published by Square Enix under their Square Enix Collective initiative, in which they ran surveys to see if the public would crowdfund games from independent developers. It was given the greenlight after a voting poll asking if people would support it on a crowdfunding campaign ended with 92% of voters saying yes and 8% voting no.

It was announced that it would instead be published by Maximum Games on 14 December 2016.

== Reception ==
Reception

Aggregate score
Aggregator	Score
Metacritic	(PC) 27/100 (PS4) 39/100 (XONE) 33/100

Review scores
Publication	Score
Computer Games Magazine	4/10
Destructoid	1/10
Nintendo Life	4/10

Troll and I received "generally unfavourable" reviews, according to review aggregator Metacritic.
