= Butcher (video game) =

2016 video game

- Developers: Phobia Game Studio; Transhuman Design
- Publishers: Crunching Koalas; Transhuman Design
- Engine: Unity
- Platforms: Linux; macOS; Windows; Nintendo Switch; PlayStation 4; Xbox One
- Release: NA: October 5, 2016 (PCs); NA: May 9–10, 2017 (PS4, XB1); NA: September 27, 2017 (NS)
- Genre: Run and gun
- Mode: Single-player

Butcher is a run and gun video game developed by Phobia Game Studio and Transhuman Design. Crunching Koalas and Transhuman Design published it in 2016.

== Gameplay ==
Players control a cyborg tasked with destroying all life on Earth. This takes the form of multiple levels of 2D platforms where the player clears all enemies. It is a run and gun video game that uses twin-stick controls.

== Development ==
Butcher was developed in Poland. A free browser game prototype was released in 2015, It was released for PCs on October 5, 2016; PlayStation 4 on May 9, 2017; Xbox One on May 10, 2017; and Nintendo Switch on September 27, 2017. The game advertises "hard" as its easiest difficulty setting. Due to player requests, a free DLC that implements casual difficulty was added.

== Reception ==
Butcher received mixed reviews on Metacritic. Hardcore Gamer recommended the game to people who enjoy violent and challenging retro games but said it may not appeal to people outside of that niche. Commenting on the game's violence, GameSpot said that "beneath that gruff exterior is a thoughtfully crafted game". Digitally Downloaded said the game comes close to its goal of channeling Doom in a 2D game but is "let down by its idea of scale". Push Square wrote, "It's brief, chaotic, and hard as nails, but this is a glorious throwback that every fan of 90s shooters should pick up." Nintendo Life said the gameplay is repetitive but recommended it to players who enjoy challenging games.
