= Divided We Fall (novel) =

2014 novel by Trent Reedy

- Author: Trent Reedy
- Published: 2014
- Publisher: Arthur A. Levine Books

Divided We Fall is a military science-fiction novel written by Trent Reedy first published in 2014. It is the first novel in a trilogy, followed by Burning Nation (2015) and The Last Full Measure (2016). In an interview, Reedy stated he had been a combat engineer in the Idaho Army National Guard who had served in Afghanistan.

Set in a near-future United States facing internal dissention, the story revolves around Danny Wright, a seventeen-year-old member of the Idaho National Guard. When Wright is sent along with his unit to enforce order and calm during a protest in Boise, Idaho, he is hit by an object which causes his rifle to fire accidentally, which results in an unintended massacre. A series of events, from national outrage at the massacre (subsequently referred to as the Battle of Boise) to the refusal of the Governor of Idaho to turn over the soldiers involved, eventually starts the Second American Civil War.

Kirkus Reviews called it "a credible military thriller", though "readers may be disappointed to find that the action in Volume 1 is intermittent". Publishers Weekly gave a more favorable review, stating "His setup is terrifying in its plausibility" and "this cautionary tale screams immediacy and urgency, a page-turner that rapidly moves toward a catastrophic cliffhanger."
