= List of The Seven Deadly Sins episodes =

The Seven Deadly Sins is a Japanese anime television series based on the manga series of the same name written and illustrated by Nakaba Suzuki. The series follows Elizabeth, the third princess of the Kingdom of Liones, who is in search of the Seven Deadly Sins, a group of former Holy Knights who were disbanded after the kingdom was overthrown. She enlists the help of Meliodas and Hawk, the leader of the Seven Deadly Sins and the leader of the order of scraps disposal, to assemble the remaining members of the Seven Deadly Sins and take back the kingdom from the Holy Knights. The series aired on MBS, TBS and their JNN affiliate stations from October 5, 2014, to March 29, 2015. An original 4-part special anime series written by Nakaba Suzuki aired from August 28 to September 18, 2016. A second season of the series was confirmed on September 27, 2015, and aired from January 13 to June 30, 2018. A third season by Studio Deen was confirmed on April 9, 2019, and aired from October 9, 2019, to March 25, 2020. A fourth season was confirmed on March 24, 2020. Originally slated for an October 2020 debut, it was postponed to premiere on January 13, 2021, due to the COVID-19 pandemic. The anime series concluded with its 100th overall episode on June 6, 2021.

An original animation DVD (OAD) titled "Ban's Additional Chapter" (バンの番外編, Ban no Bangai-hen) was included with the limited edition of volume 15 of the manga, released on June 17, 2015. A second OAD composed of nine humorous shorts was shipped with the limited edition of the sixteenth volume of the manga, released on August 12, 2015.

The first season of The Seven Deadly Sins was licensed for English release by Netflix as its second exclusive international distribution for anime, following their acquisition of Knights of Sidonia. All 24 episodes were released on November 1, 2015, in both Japanese subtitled and English dubbed formats. All four episodes from the Signs of Holy War special were added to the service on February 17, 2017. Revival of The Commandments was released in licensed markets on October 15, 2018. Imperial Wrath of The Gods was released in licensed markets on August 6, 2020. Dragon's Judgement released in licensed markets in two parts in June and September 2021.

== Series overview ==
Season	Episodes	Originally released		
Season	Episodes	First released	Last released	Network
1	24	October 5, 2014	March 29, 2015	MBS, TBS
1.5	4	August 28, 2016	September 18, 2016	MBS, TBS
2	24	January 13, 2018	June 30, 2018	MBS, TBS
3	24	October 9, 2019	March 25, 2020	TV Tokyo, BS TV Tokyo
4	24	January 13, 2021	June 23, 2021	TV Tokyo, BS TV Tokyo

== Episodes ==
=== Season 1 (2014–15) ===
Story	Episode	Title (Note: English translated titles are taken from Netflix.)	Directed by	Written by	Storyboarded by	Original release date
1	1	"The Seven Deadly Sins"; Transliteration: "Nanatsu no Taizai" (Japanese: 七つの大罪)	Tomokazu Tokoro	Shōtarō Suga	Tensai Okamura	October 5, 2014
2	2	"The Sword of the Holy Knight"; Transliteration: "Seikishi no Ken" (Japanese: 聖騎士の剣)	Hideki Ito	Shōtarō Suga	Tensai Okamura, Rokurō Sakagami	October 12, 2014
3	3	"The Sin in the Sleeping Forest"; Transliteration: "Nemureru Mori no Tsumi" (Japanese: 眠れる森の罪)	Tsuyoshi Tobita	Jukki Hanada	Futoshi Higashide	October 19, 2014
4	4	"A Little Girl's Dream"; Transliteration: "Shōjo no Yume" (Japanese: 少女の夢)	Jin Iwatsuki	Yuniko Ayana	Tensai Okamura	October 26, 2014
5	5	"Even If You Should Die"; Transliteration: "Tatoe Anata ga Shindemo" (Japanese: たとえあなたが死んでも)	Yūsuke Onoda	Shōtarō Suga	Yoshihiro Sugai	November 2, 2014
6	6	"The Poem of Beginnings"; Transliteration: "Hajimari no Uta" (Japanese: はじまりの詩)	Toshimasa Ishii	Jukki Hanada	Toshifumi Takizawa	November 9, 2014
7	7	"A Touching Reunion"; Transliteration: "Kandō no Saikai" (Japanese: 感動の再会)	Yuuta Takamura	Yuniko Ayana	Kenji Seto	November 16, 2014
8	8	"The Fearsome Pursuer"; Transliteration: "Osorubeki Tsuisekisha" (Japanese: 恐るべき追跡者)	Kenichi Imaizumi	Shōtarō Suga	Kenichi Imaizumi	November 23, 2014
9	9	"Dark Pulse"; Transliteration: "Ankoku no Myakudō" (Japanese: 暗黒の脈動)	Hideki Ito	Jukki Hanada	Hideki Ito	November 30, 2014
10	10	"The Vaizel Fighting Festival"; Transliteration: "Baizeru Kenka Matsuri" (Japanese: バイゼル喧嘩祭り)	Mitsutoshi Satō	Yuniko Ayana	Rokurō Sakagami	December 7, 2014
11	11	"Pent-Up Feelings"; Transliteration: "Sekinen no Omoi" (Japanese: 積年の想い)	Tsuyoshi Tobita	Shōtarō Suga	Takeshi Furuta	December 14, 2014
12	12	"Bloodcurdling Cannon"; Transliteration: "Senritsu no Kanon" (Japanese: 戦慄のカノン)	Jin Iwatsuki	Shōtarō Suga	Masatarō Shirogane	December 21, 2014
13	13	"The Angel of Destruction"; Transliteration: "Hakai no Shito" (Japanese: 破壊の使徒)	Akinobu Kunimoto	Shōtarō Suga	Rokurō Sakagami	January 11, 2015
14	14	"A Reader of Books"; Transliteration: "Hon wo Yomu Hito" (Japanese: 本を読むひと)	Toshimasa Ishii	Yuniko Ayana	Tensai Okamura	January 18, 2015
15	15	"Unholy Knight"; Transliteration: "Anhōryi Naito" (Japanese: アンホーリィ・ナイト)	Mitsutoshi Satō	Yuniko Ayana	Mitsutoshi Satō	January 25, 2015
16	16	"The Legends, Provoked"; Transliteration: "Karitaterareru Densetsu-tachi" (Japanese: 駆り立てられる伝説たち)	Hideki Ito	Jukki Hanada	Michio Fukuda	February 1, 2015
17	17	"The First Sacrifice"; Transliteration: "Saisho no Gisei" (Japanese: 最初の犠牲)	Yuuta Takamura	Shōtarō Suga	Yoshihiro Sugai	February 8, 2015
18	18	"Even If It Costs Me My Life"; Transliteration: "Kono Inochi ni Kaete mo" (Japanese: この命にかえても)	Kenichi Imaizumi	Yuniko Ayana	Kenichi Imaizumi	February 15, 2015
19	19	"The Fairy King Waits in Vain"; Transliteration: "Machibōke no Yōseiō" (Japanese: まちぼうけの妖精王)	Mitsutaka Noshitani	Jukki Hanada	Rokurō Sakagami	February 22, 2015
20	20	"The Courage Charm"; Transliteration: "Yūki no Majinai" (Japanese: 勇気のまじない)	Jin Iwatsuki	Shōtarō Suga	Atsushi Takahashi	March 1, 2015
21	21	"The Looming Threat"; Transliteration: "Ima, Soko ni Semaru Kyōi" (Japanese: 今、そこにせまる脅威)	Tsuyoshi Tobita	Shōtarō Suga	Tomohisa Taguchi	March 8, 2015
22	22	"What I Can Do for You"; Transliteration: "Kimi no Tame ni Dekiru Koto" (Japanese: 君のためにできること)	Yasuto Nishikata	Yuniko Ayana	Tomokazu Tokoro	March 15, 2015
23	23	"Despair Descends"; Transliteration: "Zetsubō Kōrin" (Japanese: 絶望降臨)	Hideki Ito	Jukki Hanada	Shinji Ishihira	March 22, 2015
24	24	"The Heroes"; Transliteration: "Eiyū-tachi" (Japanese: 英雄たち)	Toshimasa Ishii	Shōtarō Suga	Tensai Okamura	March 29, 2015

=== Special: Signs of Holy War (2016) ===
Story	Episode	Title	Directed by (Note: Information is taken from the ending credits of each episode.)	Written by	Storyboarded by	Original release date
25	1	"The Dark Dream Begins"; Transliteration: "Kuroki Yume no Hajimari" (Japanese: 黒き夢のはじまり)	Tomokazu Tokoro	Yuniko Ayana	Tomokazu Tokoro	August 28, 2016
26	2	"Our Fighting Festival"; Transliteration: "Futari no Kenka Matsuri" (Japanese: 二人の喧嘩祭り)	Shigeru Ueda	Yuichiro Kido	Shigeru Ueda	September 4, 2016
27	3	"In Pursuit of First Love"; Transliteration: "Hatsukoi wo Oikakete" (Japanese: 初恋を追いかけて)	Toshimasa Ishii	Yuniko Ayana	Toshimasa Ishii	September 11, 2016
28	4	"The Shape of Love"; Transliteration: "Ai no Katachi" (Japanese: 愛のかたち)	Tsuyoshi Tobita	Yuniko Ayana	Yoshikazu Miyao	September 18, 2016

=== Season 2: Revival of The Commandments (2018) ===
Story	Episode	Title	Directed by	Written by	Storyboarded by	Original release date
29	1	"Revival of the Demon Clan"; Transliteration: "Majin-zoku Fukkatsu" (Japanese: 魔神族復活)	Tomoya Tanaka	Takao Yoshioka	Takeshi Furuta	January 13, 2018
30	2	"Existence and Proof"; Transliteration: "Sonzai to Shōmei" (Japanese: 存在と証明)	Chika Nagaoka	Yuichiro Kido	Chika Nagaoka	January 20, 2018
31	3	"Sacred Treasure Lostvayne"; Transliteration: "Jingi Rosutovein" (Japanese: 神器ロストヴェイン)	Nobuyoshi Nagayama	Chiaki Nagai	Susumu Nishizawa	January 27, 2018
32	4	"The Ten Commandments on the Move"; Transliteration: "<Jikkai> Shidō" (Japanese: 〈十戒〉始動)	Yūsuke Maruyama	Masanao Akahoshi	Koichi Hatsumi	February 3, 2018
33	5	"Overwhelming Violence"; Transliteration: "Attōteki Bōryoku" (Japanese: 圧倒的暴力)	Seung Hui Son	Yutaka Yasunaga	Toshiyuki Fujisawa	February 10, 2018
34	6	"The Great Holy Knight Atones For His Sins"; Transliteration: "Tsugunai no Seikishi-chō" (Japanese: 償いの聖騎士長)	Hye Jin Seo	Chiaki Nagai	Susumu Nishizawa	February 17, 2018
35	7	"Where Memories Lead"; Transliteration: "Kioku ga Mezasu Basho" (Japanese: 記憶が目指す場所)	Shunsuke Ishikawa	Takao Yoshioka	Shunsuke Ishikawa	February 24, 2018
36	8	"The Druids' Holy Land"; Transliteration: "Doruido no Seichi" (Japanese: ドルイドの聖地)	Tomoya Tanaka	Yuichiro Kido	Tomoya Tanaka	March 3, 2018
37	9	"A Promise to A Loved One"; Transliteration: "Ai suru Mono to no Yakusoku" (Japanese: 愛する者との約束)	Kenji Takahashi	Masanao Akahoshi	Takeshi Furuta	March 10, 2018
38	10	"What We Lacked"; Transliteration: "Bokutachi ni Kaketa Mono" (Japanese: 僕たちに欠けたもの)	Minami Yoshida	Yutaka Yasunaga	Shinobu Yoshioka	March 17, 2018
39	11	"Father and Son"; Transliteration: "Chichioya to Musuko" (Japanese: 父親と息子)	Kazuya Monma	Yuichiro Kido	Susumu Nishizawa	March 24, 2018
40	12	"Where Love is Found"; Transliteration: "Ai no Arika" (Japanese: 愛の在り処)	Yūsuke Maruyama	Takao Yoshioka	Mamoru Sasaki	March 31, 2018
41	13	"Farewell, Beloved Thief"; Transliteration: "Saraba Itoshiki Tōzoku" (Japanese: さらば愛しき盗賊)	Hiroki Hirano	Masanao Akahoshi	Susumu Nishizawa	April 14, 2018
42	14	"Master of the Sun"; Transliteration: "Taiyō no Aruji" (Japanese: 太陽の主)	Jin Iwatsuki	Yutaka Yasunaga	Tensai Okamura	April 21, 2018
43	15	"A Bloodcurdling Confession"; Transliteration: "Senritsu no Kokuhaku" (Japanese: 戦慄の告白)	Takuya Asaoka	Yuichiro Kido	Koichi Hatsumi	April 28, 2018
44	16	"Death-Trap Maze"; Transliteration: "Shi no Wana no Meikyū" (Japanese: 死の罠の迷宮)	Hiroshi Kimura	Takao Yoshioka	Shunsuke Ishikawa	May 5, 2018
45	17	"Legendary Figures"; Transliteration: "Denshō no Monodomo" (Japanese: 伝承の者共)	Tomoya Tanaka	Masanao Akahoshi	Tomoya Tanaka	May 12, 2018
46	18	"For Whom Does That Light Shine?"; Transliteration: "Sono Hikari wa Ta ga tame ni" (Japanese: その光は誰が為に)	Seung Hui Son	Yutaka Yasunaga	Mamoru Sasaki	May 19, 2018
47	19	"Meliodas vs. The Ten Commandments"; Transliteration: "Meriodasu vs <Jikkai>" (Japanese: メリオダスvs<十戒>)	Yūsuke Maruyama, Tomoya Tanaka	Yuichiro Kido	Ryuuta Yanagi	May 26, 2018
48	20	"Have hope" Transliteration: "Kibō wo Motomete" (Japanese: 希望を求めて)	Minami Yoshida	Takao Yoshioka	Susumu Nishizawa	June 2, 2018
49	21	"Certain Warmth"; Transliteration: "Tashika na Nukumori" (Japanese: たしかな ぬくもり)	Hiroshi Kimura	Masanao Akahoshi	Hiroshi Kimura	June 9, 2018
50	22	"Return of the Sins"; Transliteration: "<Tsumi> no Kikan" (Japanese: 〈罪〉の帰還)	Yūsuke Shibata	Yutaka Yasunaga	Atsushi Takahashi	June 16, 2018
51	23	"The Hero Rises!"; Transliteration: "Eiyū, Tatsu!" (Japanese: 英雄、立つ！)	Masahiro Shinohara	Yuichiro Kido	Koichi Hatsumi	June 23, 2018
52	24	"As Long As You Are Here"; Transliteration: "Kimi ga Iru Dake de" (Japanese: 君がいるだけで)	Tomoya Tanaka, Aika Ikeda	Takao Yoshioka	Takeshi Furuta	June 30, 2018

=== Season 3: Imperial Wrath of The Gods (2019–20) ===
Story	Episode	Title	Directed by	Written by	Storyboarded by	Original release date
53	1	"The Light That Sweeps Away the Darkness"; Transliteration: "Yami wo Harau Hikari" (Japanese: 闇を払う光)	Bob Shirohata, Kazuya Fujishiro	Rintarou Ikeda	Bob Shirohata	October 9, 2019
54	2	"Memories of the Holy War"; Transliteration: "Seisen no Kioku" (Japanese: 聖戦の記憶)	Yoshito Hata	Rintarou Ikeda	Susumu Nishizawa	October 16, 2019
55	3	"Let There Be Light"; Transliteration: "Hikari Are" (Japanese: 光あれ)	Kazuya Fujishiro	Rie Uehara	Susumu Nishizawa	October 23, 2019
56	4	"The Ten Commandments vs. The Four Archangels"; Transliteration: "<Jikkai> vs. <Yondai Tenshi>" (Japanese: 〈十戒〉vs.〈四大天使〉)	Shunji Yoshida	Yoshiki Ōkusa	Yukihiro Matsushita	October 30, 2019
57	5	"Emotional Maelstrom"; Transliteration: "Kanjō Meirushutorōmu" (Japanese: 感情メイルストローム)	Seung Deok Kim, Yoshihisa Matsumoto	Yoshiki Ōkusa	Hideki Tonokatsu	November 6, 2019
58	6	"We Call That Love"; Transliteration: "Sore wo Bokura wa Ai to Yobu" (Japanese: それをボクらは愛と呼ぶ)	Masayuki Iimura	Rintarou Ikeda	Bob Shirohata	November 13, 2019
59	7	"Deadly Sins Unite!"; Transliteration: "Iza, Taizai Shūketsu e!!" (Japanese: いざ、大罪集結へ！！)	Yoshito Hata	Yoshiki Ōkusa	Yukihiro Matsushita	November 20, 2019
60	8	"The Doll Seeks Love"; Transliteration: "Ningyō wa Ai wo Kou" (Japanese: 人形は愛を乞う)	Shunji Yoshida	Yurika Miyao	Shinichi Watanabe	November 27, 2019
61	9	"The Cursed Lovers"; Transliteration: "Norowareshi Koibito-tachi" (Japanese: 呪われし恋人たち)	Shigeki Awai	Rie Uehara	Bob Shirohata	December 4, 2019
62	10	"The Life We Live"; Transliteration: "Sore ga Bokura no Ikirumichi" (Japanese: それが僕らの生きる道)	Kazue Otsuki	Rintarou Ikeda	Shinichi Watanabe	December 11, 2019
63	11	"The Hateful Cannot Rest"; Transliteration: "Onnen-tachi wa Nemuranai" (Japanese: 怨念たちは眠らない)	Masayuki Iimura	Rintarou Ikeda	Hideki Tonokatsu	December 18, 2019
64	12	"Love is a Maiden's Power"; Transliteration: "Ai wa Otome no Chikara" (Japanese: 愛は乙女の力)	Kazuya Fujishiro	Yoshiki Ōkusa	Megumi Soeno	December 25, 2019
65	13	"The Almighty vs. the Greatest Evil"; Transliteration: "Saikyō vs. Saikyō" (Japanese: 最強 vs. 最凶)	Shigeki Awai	Yoshiki Ōkusa	Marie Tagashira	January 8, 2020
66	14	"A New Threat"; Transliteration: "Aratanaru Kyōi" (Japanese: 新たなる脅威)	Toshihiro Nagao	Yurika Miyao	Ken'ichi Ishikura	January 15, 2020
67	15	"To Our Captain"; Transliteration: "Danchō e" (Japanese: 団長へ)	Taiki Nishimura	Rintarou Ikeda	Shinichi Watanabe	January 22, 2020
68	16	"The Seven Deadly Sins End"; Transliteration: "Nanatsu no Taizai Shūketsu" (Japanese: 〈七つの大罪〉終結)	Fumio Maezono	Rie Uehara	Masaki Ōzora	January 29, 2020
69	17	"Our Choices"; Transliteration: "Bokutachi no Sentaku" (Japanese: ボクたちの選択)	Shunji Yoshida	Rintarou Ikeda	Masaki Ōzora	February 5, 2020
70	18	"March of the Saints"; Transliteration: "Seija no Kōshin" (Japanese: 聖者の行進)	Kazuya Fujishiro	Rintarou Ikeda	Kazuya Fujishiro	February 12, 2020
71	19	"The Holy War Pact"; Transliteration: "Seisen Kyōtei" (Japanese: 聖戦協定)	Toshihiro Nagao	Yurika Miyao	Maho Aoki	February 19, 2020
72	20	"Child of Hope"; Transliteration: "Kibō no Ko" (Japanese: 希望の子)	Yoshito Hata	Yurika Miyao	Shinichi Watanabe	February 26, 2020
73	21	"Beginning of the Holy War"; Transliteration: "Seisen no Makuake" (Japanese: 聖戦の幕開け)	Fumio Maezono	Yoshiki Ōkusa	Hideki Tonokatsu	March 4, 2020
74	22	"War-torn Britannia"; Transliteration: "Senka no Buritania" (Japanese: 戦禍のブリタニア)	Masayuki Iimura	Rintarou Ikeda	Bob Shirohata	March 11, 2020
75	23	"The One Twisted by Darkness"; Transliteration: "Yami ni Yugamu Mono" (Japanese: 闇に歪む者)	Taiki Nishimura	Rintarou Ikeda	Shigenori Kageyama	March 18, 2020
76	24	"Rampaging Love"; Transliteration: "Bōsō suru Ai" (Japanese: 暴走する愛)	Shunji Yoshida, Hideki Tonokatsu, Shinichi Watanabe	Rintarou Ikeda	Masaki Ōzora	March 25, 2020

=== Season 4: Dragon's Judgement (2021) ===
Story	Episode	Title	Directed by	Written by	Storyboarded by	Original release date
77	1	"From Purgatory"; Transliteration: "Rengoku Yori" (Japanese: 煉獄より)	Yukio Nishimoto	Rintarou Ikeda	Yukio Nishimoto	January 13, 2021
78	2	"A Meeting with the Unknown"; Transliteration: "Michi to no Sōgū" (Japanese: 未知との遭遇)	Akira Mano	Rintarou Ikeda	Rie Nishino	January 20, 2021
79	3	"A Single-Minded Love"; Transliteration: "Ichizu Naru Omoi" (Japanese: 一途なる想い)	Hideki Tonokatsu	Rintarou Ikeda	Susumu Nishizawa	January 27, 2021
80	4	"The Victims of the Holy War"; Transliteration: "Seisen no Giseisha" (Japanese: 聖戦の犠牲者)	Hidehiko Kadota	Rintarou Ikeda	Sarin Kageyama	February 3, 2021
81	5	"The Tragic Strike"; Transliteration: "Kanashiki Ichigeki" (Japanese: 悲しき一撃)	Yoshinari Suzuki, Yoshito Hata	Rintarou Ikeda	Aokiho	February 10, 2021
82	6	"Confront Despair!!"; Transliteration: "Zetsubō ni Tachimukae" (Japanese: 絶望に立ち向かえ)	Akira Mano	Yoshiki Ōkusa	Hideki Tonokatsu	February 17, 2021
83	7	"Hope, Conflict, and Despair"; Transliteration: "Kibō to Kattō to Zetsubō" (Japanese: 希望と葛藤と絶望)	Dali Chen	Yurika Miyao	Dali Chen	February 24, 2021
84	8	"The Doorway to Hope"; Transliteration: "Kibō e no Tobira" (Japanese: 希望への扉)	Hidehiko Kadota	Rintarou Ikeda	Bob Shirahata	March 3, 2021
85	9	"That Which Gathers"; Transliteration: "Shūketsu Suru Mono-tachi" (Japanese: 集結するものたち)	Yukio Nishimoto	Yoshiki Ōkusa	Yukio Nishimoto	March 10, 2021
86	10	"The Salvation of the Sun"; Transliteration: "Taiyō no Kyūsai" (Japanese: 太陽の救済)	Kazuya Fujishiro	Yoshiki Ōkusa	Koichi Ohata	March 17, 2021
87	11	"The One Who Stands Against a God"; Transliteration: "Kami to Taiji Suru Hito" (Japanese: 神と対峙する人)	Akihiro Nagao	Yurika Miyao	Sarin Kageyama	March 24, 2021
88	12	"We'll All Be Your Strength"; Transliteration: "Minna ga Kimi no Chikara ni Naru" (Japanese: みんながキミの力になる)	Mayu Numayama	Yurika Miyao	Seiki Taichu	March 31, 2021
89	13	"The End of a Long Journey"; Transliteration: "Nagaki Tabi no Shūchaku" (Japanese: 永き旅の終着)	Yoshito Hata	Yoshiki Ōkusa	Aokiho	April 7, 2021
90	14	"Farewell, Seven Deadly Sins"; Transliteration: "Sayonara〈Nanatsu no Taizai〉" (Japanese: さよなら〈七つの大罪〉)	Hidehiko Kadota	Yurika Miyao	Bob Shirahata	April 14, 2021
91	15	"Fated Brothers"; Transliteration: "Shukumei no Kyōdai" (Japanese: 宿命の兄弟)	Dali Chen	Rintarou Ikeda	Dali Chen	April 21, 2021
92	16	"The Final Battle"; Transliteration: "Saishū Sensō" (Japanese: 最終戦争)	Hideki Tonokatsu	Rintarou Ikeda	Hideki Tonokatsu	April 28, 2021
93	17	"The Voice Calling Your Name"; Transliteration: "Kimi no Na o Yobu Koe" (Japanese: キミの名を呼ぶ声)	Sumito Sasaki	Rintarou Ikeda	Yukihiro Matsushita	May 5, 2021
94	18	"The King Sings Alone"; Transliteration: "Ō wa Kodoku ni Utau" (Japanese: 王は孤独に歌う)	Akira Mano	Yurika Miyao	Yukio Nishimoto	May 12, 2021
95	19	"The Struggle"; Transliteration: "Agaki" (Japanese: あがき)	Masahiro Takada	Yoshiki Ōkusa	Seiki Taichu	May 19, 2021
96	20	"Mortal Enemies"; Transliteration: "Tomo ni Ten o Itadakazu" (Japanese: 倶に天を戴かず)	Hideki Tonokatsu	Rintarou Ikeda	Hideki Tonokatsu	May 26, 2021
97	21	"What the Witch Had Always Wanted"; Transliteration: "Majo ga Motome Tsuzuketa Mono" (Japanese: 魔女が求め続けたもの)	Hidehiko Kadota	Rintarou Ikeda	Koichi Ohata	June 2, 2021
98	22	"A Taste of Chaos"; Transliteration: "Konton no Ittan" (Japanese: 混沌の一端)	Yoshito Hata	Yurika Miyao	Bob Shirahata	June 9, 2021
99	23	"An Everlasting Kingdom"; Transliteration: "Eien no Ōkoku" (Japanese: 永遠の王国)	Fumio Maezono	Yoshiki Ōkusa	Hideki Tonokatsu	June 16, 2021
100	24	"Heirs"; Transliteration: "Tsugare Yuku Mono" (Japanese: 継がれゆくもの)	Kanji Wakabayashi	Rintarou Ikeda	Yukihiro Matsushita	June 23, 2021

== OADs (2015–18) ==
No.	Title	Directed by	Written by	Storyboarded by	Original release date
1	"Bandit Ban"; Transliteration: "Bandetto Ban" (Japanese: バンデット・バン)	Tomokazu Tokoro	Shōtarō Suga	Tomokazu Tokoro	June 17, 2015
Somewhere in northern Britannia, Ban arrives at the Fairy King's Forest in search of the Fountain of Youth. He quickly climbs up the large majestic tree, and ends up meeting a mysterious young girl whom he ignores initially. He decides to ask her who she is, only to discover that she was the Guardian Saint protecting the fountain. Swiftly, she swings her hand and the winds blow Ban off the tree. However, Ban survives the fall and persistently continues to climb up again. He repeatedly climbs up and gets blown off, until both of them grows extremely annoyed. In order to obtain the fountain, Ban equips himself with his Nunchaku, leading Elaine to believe that he was planning to kill and steal like all other humans. To her surprise, he quickly grabs the Fountain of Youth and begins drinking. But before he could even take a sip, Elaine manipulates the tree branches and immobilizes him by grabbing all of his limbs. She then persuades him that without the Fountain of Youth, the forest itself will die. Astonishingly, Ban replies straightforwardly, stating that he understands. When Elaine decides to read his heart, she discovers that he really had the intentions of giving up. She releases him and the two begin to get to know each other. Ban tells her that the reason for stealing the fountain is to hope for something good to happen in his life. In response, she replies saying that she already lived for over 700 years, protecting the cup in place of her brother, King, who abandoned her. Ban decides to show her his ale label collection and the two bonded over a span of 7 days. Suddenly, when Ban was away, she quietly whispers that she wished that he had come to steal her instead of the Fountain of Youth. She was startled to discover Ban behind her, who had heard what she said, and realized that they both have similar thoughts and feelings. Out of the blue, a mysterious monster from the Demon Clan appears, burning the forest with its Purgatory Fire. Ban immediately confronts the monster after telling Elaine to escape with the fountain, and successfully robs one of its hearts. Not realizing that it had more than one heart, he lets down his guard and as a result, both of them get severely injured by the monster. Both of them realize that the only way to survive was to drink the Fountain of Youth, which means that only one of them could live. The two of them wanted each other to drink the fountain, hoping for their survival. In desperation, Elaine seemingly drinks the liquid, only to kiss Ban and deliver it to him directly. Ban immediately recovers from the injuries after consuming the liquid, and quickly defeats the monster in rage. Before passing away, Elaine gives him the forest's last seed and he repeats, Someday, I'll definitely make you mine. Sadly, before he was able to finish the phrase, she was gone. Later on, somewhere within the Kingdom of Liones, Ban is judged and sentenced to death for his apparent sins of destroying the Fairy King's Forest, taking the Fountain of Youth and killing the Guardian Saint. As the captain of the guard asked Ban if he has any last words before execution, Ban told everyone present that he is no longer "Bandit Ban" and "Undead Ban" is now his name. Bundled with the limited edition 15th volume of the manga.
2	"Heroes Fun Time: Extra Stories Compilation"; Transliteration: "Eiyū-tachi no Tawamure: Bangai-henshū" (Japanese: 英雄たちの戯れ -番外編集-)	Takayuki Onoda	Shōtarō Suga	Kenichi Imaizumi, Tensai Okamura	August 12, 2015
An OAD compilation of short clip stories. Bundled with the limited edition 16th volume of the manga.
3	"Heroes' Frolic"; Transliteration: "Eiyū-tachi wa Hashagu" (Japanese: 英雄たちは燥(はしゃ)ぐ)	N/A	N/A	N/A	November 16, 2018
An OAD bundled with the 34th volume of the manga.
