= Loot Rascals =

2017 video game

- Developer: Hollow Ponds
- Publisher: Hollow Ponds
- Director: Ricky Haggett
- Producer: Pat Ashe
- Designers: Ricky Haggett; Jonathan Whiting; Max Foster
- Programmer: Max Foster
- Artists: Swatpaz; Meowza; Jon Boam; Maki Yoshikura
- Composers: Grandmaster Gareth; Cassini Sound
- Platforms: Microsoft Windows, PlayStation 4
- Release: March 7, 2017
- Genres: Roguelike, turn-based strategy
- Mode: Single-player

Loot Rascals is a turn-based strategy roguelike video game developed and published by British independent game studio Hollow Ponds. The game released on March 7, 2017, for Microsoft Windows and PlayStation 4. Loot Rascals received mixed reviews from critics.

== Development ==
Hollow Ponds announced Loot Rascals for PC and PlayStation 4 on May 25, 2016, with a release date of early 2017.

== Reception ==
Reception

Aggregate score
Aggregator	Score
Metacritic	PC: 71/100; PS4: 71/100

Review scores
Publication	Score
Destructoid	8.5/10
Game Informer	7.75/10
GameSpot	5/10
Push Square	6/10
Digitally Downloaded	4/5

Loot Rascals received "mixed or average" reviews according to review aggregator Metacritic.

Push Square's Kell Andersen rated the game 6/10 stars, calling it an "intriguing" and an "infectiously charming" roguelike. Andersen praised the central mechanics of the game, but criticized the card-based stat system as offering "little strategic variety". He also felt that the game's procedural generation could be "frustrating".

Nick Valdez of Destructoid rated the game 8.5/10.

Reviewing for Game Informer, Suriel Vazquez wrote that the game's deck-building was "smart", the combat was "breezy", and the strategy layer was "interesting". Vazquez felt that the combination of procedural generation and the game's difficulty made him feel like a "victim of chance" instead of a "mastermind".

GameSpot's James O'Connor gave the game a 5/10, praising the visuals and monster design, but believed that the game did not have "enough narrative substance to create long-term investment".
