= Divided We Fall (video game) =

- Developer: KAVA Game Studios
- Publisher: KAVA Game Studios
- Engine: Unity Engine
- Platforms: Microsoft Windows; OS X Linux
- Release: 2 October 2017
- Genre: Real-time strategy
- Mode: Multiplayer

Divided We Fall, originally known as Call of Combat, is a multiplayer real time strategy game, made by Dutch studio KAVA Game Studios. It entered Steam Early Access on 7 September 2016, followed by its full release one year later on 2 October. It currently has mixed reviews on Steam.

== Gameplay ==
Divided We Fall is set during the Second World War, and players control a squad of four soldiers with the objective of controlling victory points. In the standard game mode, player troops do not respawn if killed, but in a Reinforcements game mode players can respawn their units. The game stands out from similar games due to a pre-battle planning stage, where the most experienced player can draw instructions for other players on his team onto a map of the playing area.

A cooperative mode where players fight alone or together against AI opponents was added when the game was released from Early Access. It is similar to the Reinforcements game mode, because player units and the AI enemies respawn.
