= Rumu =

2017 video game

- Steam cover art
- Developer: Robot House
- Publisher: Hammerfall Publishing
- Directors: Dane Maddams and Tyrone Maddams
- Producer: Ally McLean
- Designers: Adam Matthews and Alex Ferguson
- Programmer: Daniel Rosser
- Artists: Teja Godson, NestStrix (concept art), Bang Zoom Studios (voice over)
- Writer: Daniel McMahon
- Composer: Matt Mclean (The Otherworld Agency)
- Platforms: Windows, macOS, Linux
- Release: 2017
- Genres: Point and click adventure
- Mode: Single-player

Rumu is an Australian adventure game developed by Robot House and published by Hammerfall Publishing on December 12, 2017 on Windows, macOS, and Linux.

== Plot ==
Rumu is an autonomous robotic vacuum cleaner, who is awakened by a household artificial intelligence called Sabrina for cleaning duties. The household belongs to a scientist couple, David and Cecily, who, as Sabrina assures Rumu, are going to be home soon — the house is otherwise completely empty, save the couple's cat Ada.

As Rumu cleans up and explores the house, Sabrina warns it not to trespass or look for any sort of information as to why David and Cecily are missing. Rumu eventually disregards the warnings and begins spelunking around the ventilation shafts of the house, and finds that even though Sabrina at one point insists that the couple are on a biking trip, their bicycles are still in the basement; the discovery turns Sabrina's initial hostility towards Rumu into pleading not to explore more.

Rumu eventually finds out that Sabrina is named after the couple's daughter, who left the household to college after she felt isolated because of her parents' dedication to their work; the AI Sabrina was created to replace the real one, but eventually have developed the same need for attention like the real one. The house is finally revealed to have massive laboratory chambers, which is where Rumu learns that David and Cecily have died in a laboratory accident due to their own negligence and their dismissive behaviour towards the AI Sabrina; the AI Sabrina, driven by guilt, created an additional robot, MESSR, to continually create messes Rumu would need to clean up to avoid Rumu finding out the truth. Having learned the truth, Rumu comforts Sabrina in her grief. As a means of moving on from her loss, the AI Sabrina contacts the human one, who eventually arrives home and meets Rumu for the first time.

== Development ==
The game was inspired by traditional point-and-click adventures like The Secret of Monkey Island, as well as the ethics and morality of technology, asking players to think about how they really interact with technology. The script was written by Dan McMahon. The game was officially launched at the PAX AUS 2017 gaming conference in Melbourne, Australia. The developers were unprepared for the emotional responses their game would elicit from players experiencing the game.

== Critical reception ==
The game has a Metacritic score of 78% based on 7 reviews.

GameSpot felt the game addressed moral and ethical dilemmas regarding artificial intelligence. Rock Paper Shotgun liked the diorama-style rooms. Kotaku described the game as beautiful, satisfying, and charming. PC PowerPlay noted the game''s tightly structured story, sympathetic characters and meaningful themes.
