= United we stand, divided we fall =

American mottos

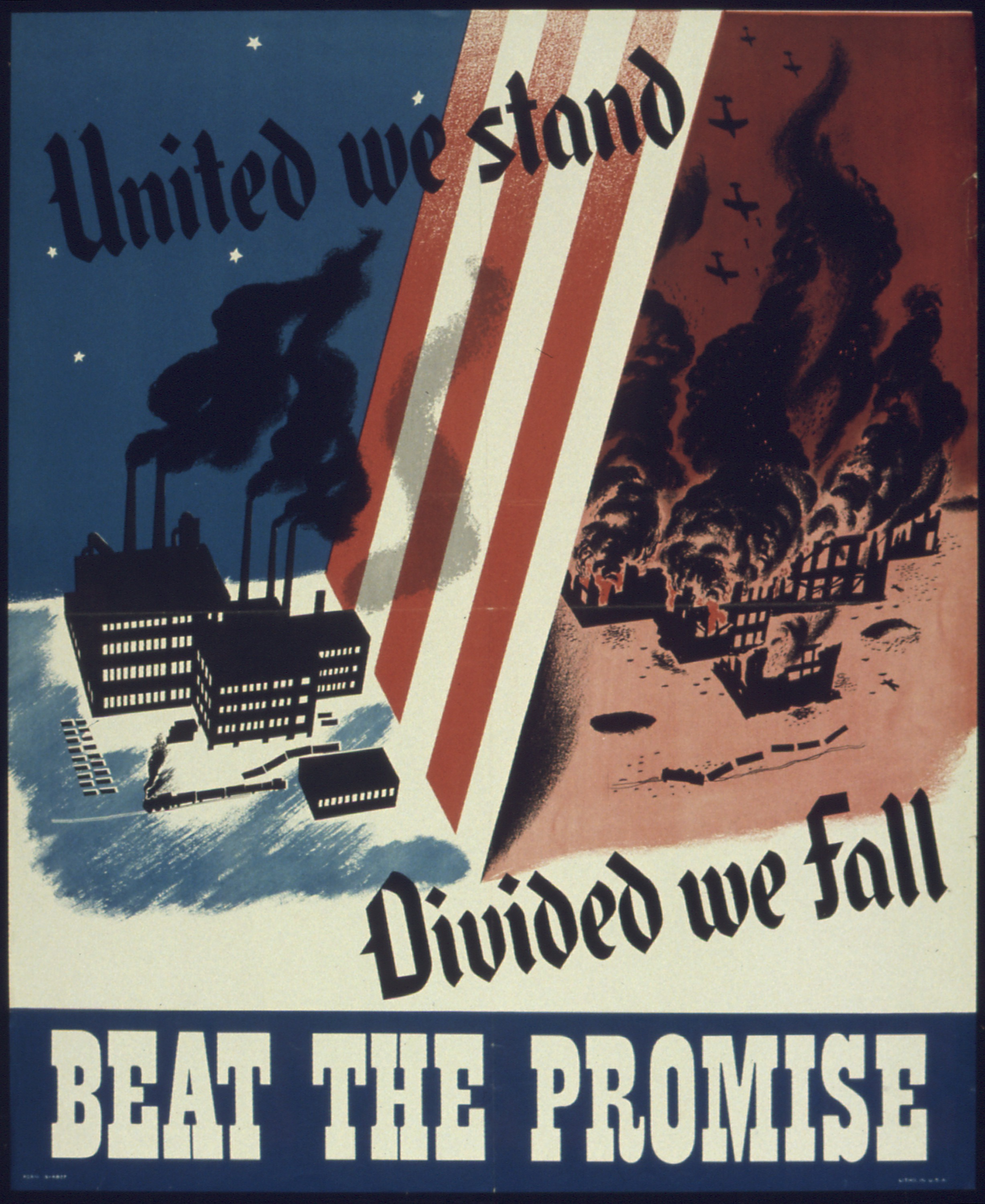
World War II era American propaganda poster.

"United we stand, divided we fall" is a phrase used in many different kinds of mottos, most often to inspire unity and collaboration. Its core concept lies in the collectivist notion that if individual members of a certain group with binding ideals – such as a union, coalition, confederation or alliance – work on their own instead of as a team, they are each doomed to fail and will all be defeated. The phrase is also often referred to with only the words "United we stand".

== Historical origin ==
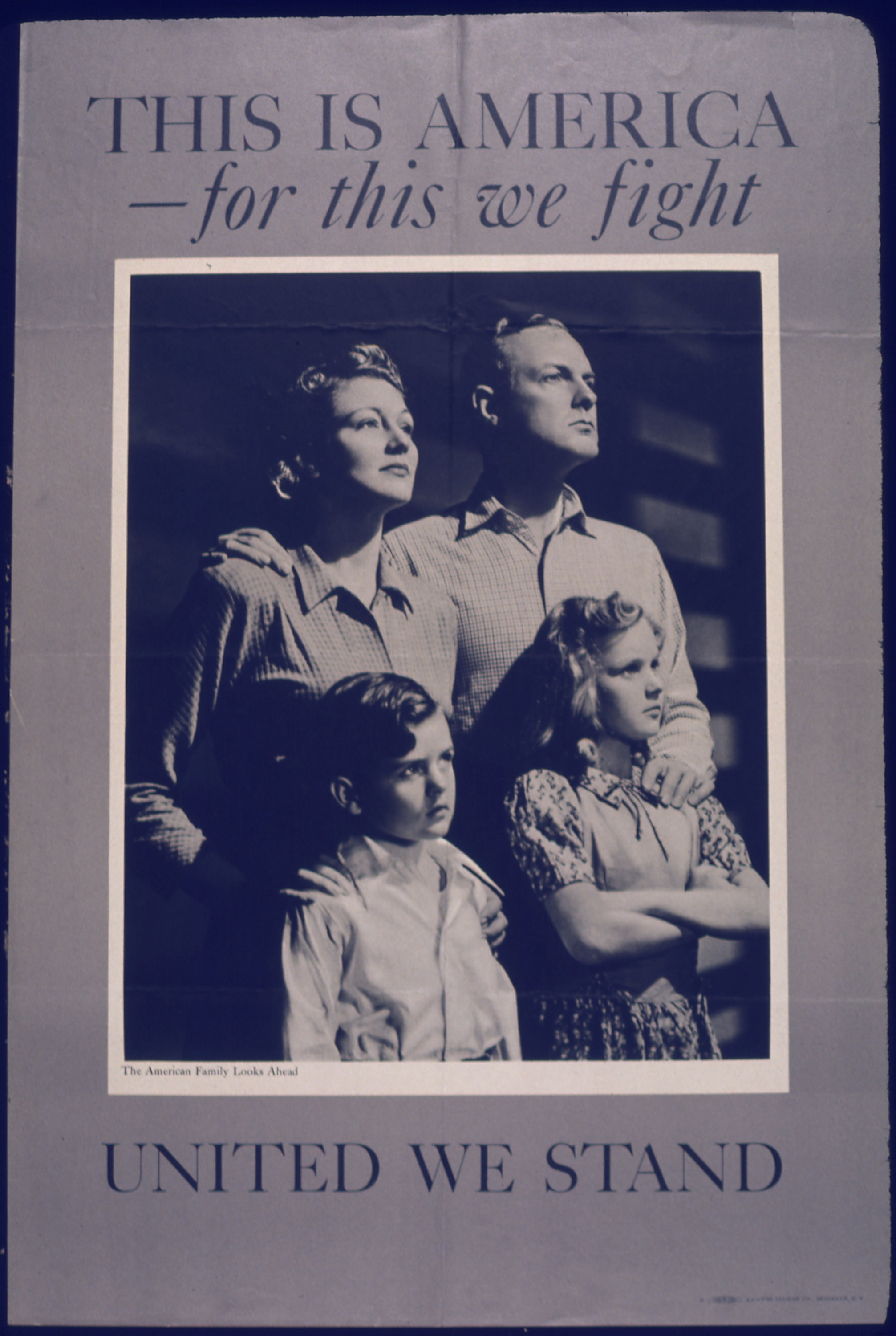
United States propaganda poster from World War II

The phrase has been attributed to the ancient Greek storyteller Aesop, both directly in his fable "The Four Oxen and the Lion" and indirectly in "The Bundle of Sticks".

=== Christian Bible references ===
A similar phrase also appears in the biblical "New Testament" – translated into English from the historic Greek in Mark 3:25 as "And if a house be divided against itself, that house cannot stand". Similar verses of the Christian Bible include Matthew 12:25 ("And Jesus knew their thoughts, and said unto them, Every kingdom divided against itself is brought to desolation; and every city or house divided against itself shall not stand") and Luke 11:17 ("But he, knowing their thoughts, said unto them, Every kingdom divided against itself is brought to desolation; and a house divided against a house falleth.").

The 1911 Encyclopaedia Britannica quotes Robert Grosseteste (d. 1253) saying "It is written that united we stand and divided we fall."

== Use in U.S. history ==
The first attributed use in modern times is to Founding Father John Dickinson in his pre-Revolutionary War song "The Liberty Song", first published on July 7, 1768, in both the Pennsylvania Journal and Pennsylvania Gazette newspapers. In the song Dickinson wrote: "Then join hand in hand, brave Americans all! By uniting we stand, by dividing we fall!"

In 1792, Kentucky adopted the motto as part of the design for the state seal. Since 1942, this phrase has been the official English language state motto of Kentucky. Note that, in 2002, Kentucky also adopted an official Latin motto: Deo gratiam habeamus ("Let us be grateful to God").

In March 1799, Patrick Henry used the phrase in his last public speech, in which he denounced The Kentucky and Virginia Resolutions. Clasping his hands and swaying unsteadily, Henry declaimed: "Let us trust God, and our better judgment to set us right hereafter. United we stand, divided we fall. Let us not split into factions which must destroy that union upon which our existence hangs." At the end of his oration, Henry fell into the arms of bystanders and was carried, almost lifeless, into a nearby tavern. He would die just two months later.

In 1858, during his unsuccessful campaign against Stephen Douglas, Abraham Lincoln gave a speech centered on the House divided analogy to illustrate the need for a universal decision on slavery across all states.

The phrase is written around the center circle of the seal of Missouri.

== Modern political uses ==
Examples of political uses outside the U.S. include the following:

- Winston Churchill, June 16, 1941 used the phrase "United we stand. Divided we fall" in a broadcast from London to the U.S. on receiving an Honorary Degree from the University of Rochester,
- The Economist edition that appeared during Brexit was entitled "Divided we fall".
- The president of the European Council, Donald Tusk, used the motto in his letter of invitation to the heads of state and government of the EU, for their informal summit in Valletta, Malta, on February 3, 2017. Tusk addressed the motto to the leaders of the 27 member states of the future EU without the United Kingdom.
- Former South Korean president, Syngman Rhee, is credited with using the following variation: "united we live, divided we die".
- CPAC Hungary 2023 used this phrase as following "United we stand" as the motto of the Convention.

== See also ==
- The Sznajd model – also referred to as "United we stand, divided we fall (USDF) model"
- Join, or Die
