= David Vincent (voice actor) =

American voice actor

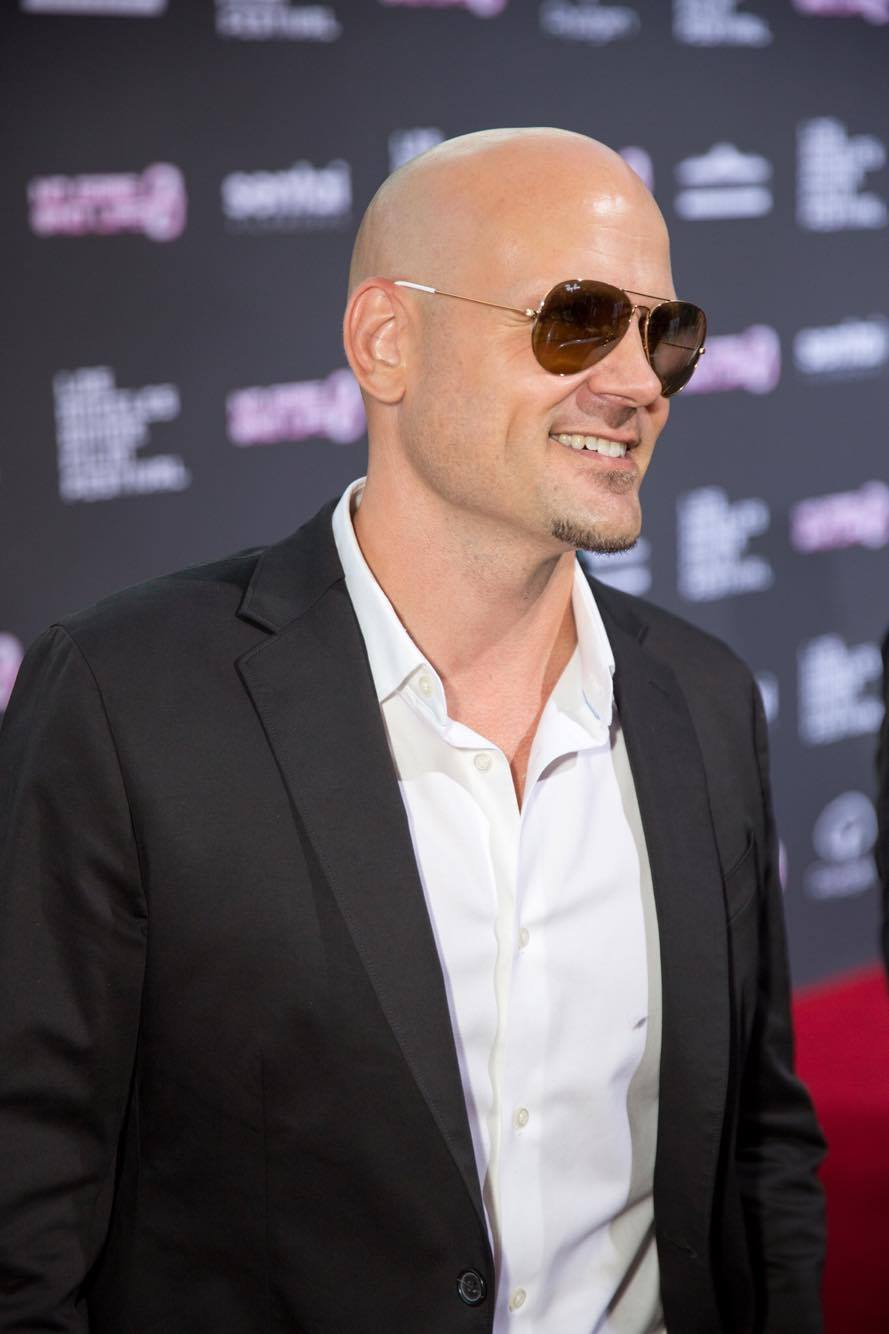
- Vincent at the LA Anime Film Festival 2017 Celebrity Red Carpet Event
- Other name: Dave Earnest
- Education: University of Colorado at Boulder
- Occupations: Voice actor; voice director
- Years active: 2000–present

David Vincent is an American voice actor and voice director who provides voices for animation, anime and video games. Some roles include Grimmjow Jaegerjaquez in Bleach, Senketsu in Kill la Kill, Gilgamesh in Fate/Zero & Fate/stay night, Male Robin in Fire Emblem Awakening, the Super Smash Bros. series and Code Name: S.T.E.A.M., Marshall Law in the Tekken series, T. Hawk in Super Street Fighter IV, Richter Belmont in Castlevania: The Dracula X Chronicles, the narrator of JoJo's Bizarre Adventure, and Jin Kisaragi and Hakumen in the BlazBlue series. He also had a guest role in Ghost in the Shell.

== Filmography ==
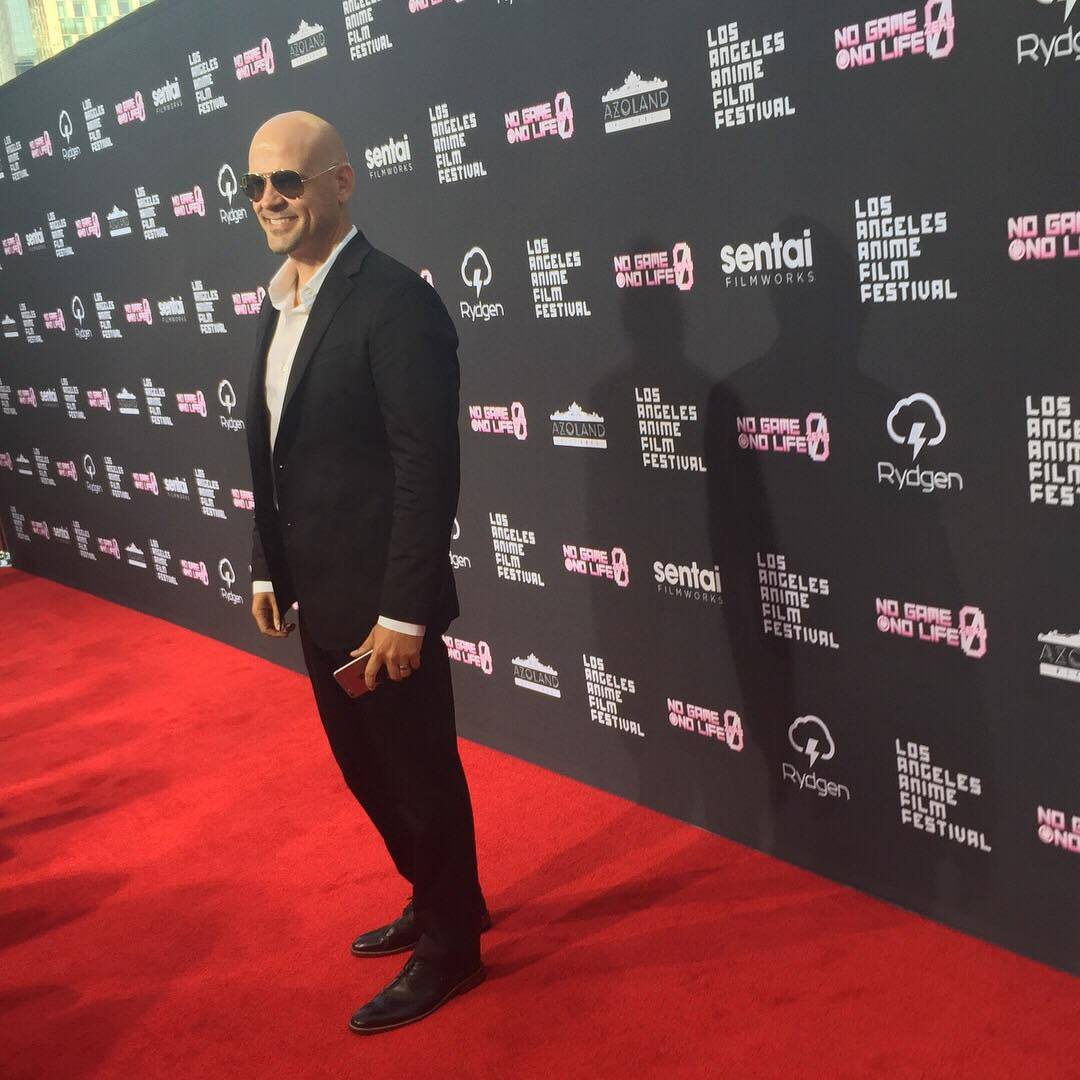
Celebrity Guest at the LA Anime Film Festival 2017 Red Carpet Event.

=== Anime ===
List of dubbing performances in anime
Year	Title	Role	Notes	Source
2004	Yukikaze	News Anchor	As David Earnest	CA
2005	Daphne in the Brilliant Blue	Katsuya Mori		CA
2005	Saiyuki Reload	Thug		CA
2006	Saiyuki Reload Gunlock	Innkeeper		CA
2006	Gun Sword	Van	First lead role	Press
2006	Fate/stay night	Assassin/Kojirō Sasaki		
2007	Tokko	Itto Araragi	As David Earnest	CA
2007–08	Blue Dragon	General Logi		Press
2007–09	Naruto	Fukusuke Hikyakuya	As David Earnest	
2008	Code Geass	Nagata, Li Xingke	As David Earnest	CA
2008	Aika R-16: Virgin Mission	Captain		CA
2008	Kamen Rider: Dragon Knight	Camo		
2009	Monster	Various		
2009	Blade of the Immortal	Gilchi		Press
2009–12	Bleach	Grimmjow Jaegerjaquez, Kouga Kuchiki		Press
2011	Kekkaishi	Sakon		Press
2011–16	Durarara!!	Seiji Yagiri		
2012	Persona 4: The Animation	Daisuke Nagase		
2013	Fate/Zero	Archer/Gilgamesh		
2013, 2024	Blue Exorcist	Arthur Auguste Angel		Press
2014–15	Kill la Kill	Senketsu	Also OVA	
2015	One Piece	Duval	Funimation dub	Tweet
2015	D-Frag!	Boruta Torada	Ep. 12; Funimation dub	Tweet
2015	Wanna be the Strongest in the World	Seiichi Inoba		
2015	Hyperdimension Neptunia: The Animation	Anonydeath	Funimation dub	
2015	BlazBlue Alter Memory	Jin Kisaragi, Hakumen		
2015	Fate/stay night: Unlimited Blade Works	Gilgamesh		
2015	JoJo's Bizarre Adventure	Narrator		Tweet
2015	Mobile Suit Gundam: The Origin	Gaia		
2016	Aldnoah.Zero	Zebrin		
2016	No-Rin		Funimation dub	Tweet
2016	Psycho-Pass	Akira Yamatoya		Tweet
2016	The Asterisk War	Madiath Mesa		Tweet
2016	Charlotte	Furuki		Tweet
2016	Bungo Stray Dogs	Sakunosuke Oda	2nd season	
2016	Magi: Adventure of Sinbad	Barbarossa		Tweet
2016	Mob Psycho 100	Tokugawa, Gozu		Tweet
2016–17	Mobile Suit Gundam: Iron-Blooded Orphans	Naze Turbine	2 seasons	Tweet
2017	Hunter × Hunter	Phinks, Rabid Dog	2011 series Eps. 43–44	
2017–18	JoJo's Bizarre Adventure: Stardust Crusaders	Narrator, ZZ		Tweet
2018	Katsugeki/Touken Ranbu		ADR Director	
2018	Hero Mask	Jasper	Netflix dub	
2018–19	JoJo's Bizarre Adventure: Diamond Is Unbreakable	Narrator, Kai Harada		Press
2018–21	The Seven Deadly Sins	Estarossa, Mael		
2019	Cells at Work!	Memory Cell		
2019–20	JoJo's Bizarre Adventure: Golden Wind	Narrator		
2019–20	Fate/Grand Order - Absolute Demonic Front: Babylonia	Caster/Gilgamesh		
2020	Magia Record: Puella Magi Madoka Magica Side Story	Tsuruno's Father		
2020	Ghost in the Shell: SAC_2045	Spy		
2021–22	JoJo's Bizarre Adventure: Stone Ocean	Narrator, Prison Guard, Speedwagon Foundation Representative		
2021–23	Jujutsu Kaisen	Kento Nanami		
2022	Fate/Grand Carnival	Gilgamesh		
2022, 2024	Bleach: Thousand-Year Blood War	Grimmjow Jaegerjaquez, Shaz Domino		
2023	Mashle: Magic and Muscles	Claude Lucci		
2023–present	Rurouni Kenshin	Sadojima Hōji	Season 2	
2024–present	Fate/strange Fake	Archer/Gilgamesh		

=== Films ===
List of dubbing performances in direct-to-video, feature and television films
Year	Title	Role	Notes	Source
2008	Kite Liberator	Danish ISS Crewmember, Real Estate Agent		
2011	Tekken: Blood Vengeance	Shin Kamiya	Limited theatrical release	
2012	Fate/stay night: Unlimited Blade Works	Assassin/Kojirō Sasaki		
2012	Resident Evil: Damnation	Secretary	As David Earnest; Also motion capture for Buddy	
2016	Kingsglaive: Final Fantasy XV	Kingsglaive	As David Earnest	
2018	Fate/stay night: Heaven's Feel I. presage flower	Gilgamesh	As David Earnest; Limited theatrical release	
2019	Fate/stay night: Heaven's Feel II. lost butterfly	Gilgamesh		
2021	The Seven Deadly Sins: Cursed by Light	Mael		
2022	Jujutsu Kaisen 0	Kento Nanami		

=== Animation ===
List of voice performances in animation
Year	Title	Role	Notes	Source
2000	Static Shock	F-Stop Gangster #1	Ep. "Shock to the System"	Resume
2008	The Spectacular Spider-Man	Additional Voices		Resume
2014–present	Boj	Mr. Nibblit		Tweet

=== Video games ===
List of voice performances in video games
Year	Title	Role	Notes	Source
2005	Quake 4	Corporal William Rhodes		Resume
2006	EverQuest II: Kingdom of Sky	Additional Voices		Resume
2006	Tales of Phantasia	Chester Barklight		Press
2006	Time Crisis 4	Giorgio Bruno		
2007	Bleach series	Grimmjow Jaegerjaquez		Press
2007	Castlevania: The Dracula X Chronicles	Richter Belmont		Press
2008	Tales of Vesperia	Tison		Press
2008	Infinite Undiscovery	Edward		Press
2008	BlazBlue: Calamity Trigger	Jin Kisaragi, Hakumen		Press
2009	The Last Remnant	Blocter		Press
2009	Section 8	Additional Voices		Press
2009	Final Fantasy Crystal Chronicles: The Crystal Bearers	Keiss		
2009–present	Tekken series	Marshall Law, Forrest Law	Starting with Tekken 6 (as Marshall) and Tekken Tag Tournament 2 (as Forrest)	Press
2010	Super Street Fighter IV	T. Hawk		
2010	Alpha Protocol	Additional Voices	Uncredited	Press
2010	BlazBlue: Continuum Shift	Jin Kisaragi, Hakumen		
2010	Medal of Honor	Morgan		Press
2011	The Legend of Heroes: Trails in the Sky	Colonel Alan Richard		Facebook
2012	Soulcalibur V	English Voices		
2012	Resident Evil: Revelations	Raymond Vester		Press
2012	Street Fighter X Tekken	Marshall Law		
2012	Tales of Graces f	Richard		
2012	Spec Ops: The Line	Additional Voices	Uncredited	Press
2012	Dead or Alive 5	Eliot		Press
2012	Halo 4	Marine	As Dave Earnest	Press
2013	Fire Emblem Awakening	Robin	Credited under "Avatars"	
2014	Earth Defense Force 2025	Ranger 8		
2014	BlazBlue: Chronophantasma	Jin Kisaragi, Hakumen		Tweet
2014	Super Smash Bros. for Nintendo 3DS and Wii U	Robin		Facebook
2015	Code Name: S.T.E.A.M.	Robin		Press
2015	Star Wars: Battlefront	Additional Voices		Tweet
2016	Seven Knights	Dellons Snolde Black Scythe		Facebook
2016	Fire Emblem Fates	Robin		Tweet
2016	Atelier Sophie: The Alchemist of the Mysterious Book	Harol		Tweet
2016	God Eater: Resurrection	Male Custom Voice 9		Tweet
2016	God Eater 2: Rage Burst	Male Custom Voice 9		Tweet
2017	Fire Emblem Heroes	Robin (Male), Michalis		
2017	God Wars: Future Past	Ookuninishi		Tweet
2017	Fire Emblem Warriors	Robin (Male)	Listed in cast credits	Tweet
2018	BlazBlue: Cross Tag Battle	Jin Kisaragi, Hakumen	Crossover game featuring BlazBlue characters	Tweet
2018	Super Smash Bros. Ultimate	Robin, Richter Belmont	from Fire Emblem and Castlevania respectively	Tweet
2019	Kill la Kill: If	Senketsu		
2023	Fire Emblem Engage	Robin		

=== Live-action ===
List of acting performances in film and television
Year	Title	Role	Notes	Source
2002	Do Over	Pat (age 34)	Episode: "Pilot"	Resume
2003	Threat Matrix	Clerk	Episode: "Natural Borne Killers"	Resume
2004	LAX	Mechanic	Episode: "Secret Santa"	Resume
2005	Criminal Minds	ATF Agent	Episode: "Won't Get Fooled Again"	Press
2006	NCIS	Marine SSGT. Erik Niles	Episode: "Witch Hunt"	
2006	The Nine	Cop	Episode: "Take Me Instead"	
2008	Shark	Sheriff's Deputy	Episode: "Bar Fight"	Resume
2009	Fear Itself	Neighbor Man	Episode: "Chance"	Resume
2012	The Mentalist	Agent Jurmain	Episode: "Blood Feud"	Press
