= Code Name: S.T.E.A.M. =

2015 turn-based strategy game

- Packaging artwork released for all territories
- Developer: Intelligent Systems
- Publisher: Nintendo
- Director: Paul Patrashcu
- Producers: Toru Narihiro; Hitoshi Yamagami
- Designer: Masayuki Horikawa
- Programmer: Susumu Ishihara
- Artist: Takako Sakai
- Writer: Mitsuyasu Sakai
- Composer: Yoshito Sekigawa
- Platform: Nintendo 3DS
- Release: NA: March 13, 2015; JP: May 14, 2015; EU: May 15, 2015; AU: May 16, 2015
- Genre: Turn-based strategy
- Modes: Single-player, multiplayer

Code Name: S.T.E.A.M., known in Japan with the subtitle Lincoln vs. Aliens, (Note: (リンカーン VS エイリアン Rinkān Bāsasu Eirian)) is a turn-based strategy video game developed by Intelligent Systems and published by Nintendo for the Nintendo 3DS handheld game console. The story is set in an alternate steampunk-based history and features a Silver Age comic book art style and a cast of characters from across American literature and folklore. The gameplay blends turn-based strategy with third-person shooter elements in a similar vein to the Valkyria Chronicles series.

== Gameplay ==
During the player's turn, characters are directly controlled from a third-person shooter style perspective.

Code Name: S.T.E.A.M. is a turn-based strategy game controlled in the style of a third-person shooter, similar to Sega's Valkyria Chronicles series. The gameplay involves a team of characters controlled by the player known as the "Agents of S.T.E.A.M." facing off against an opposing team of alien invaders. For the player, both movement and attacking requires the use of "steam", a resource that depletes whenever a character moves around or uses their weapon, in the latter case depending on the type of weapon be used. By saving up the same amount of steam required for the character's weapon to be used, certain characters can perform "overwatch attacks" during the opponent's turn, letting them attack enemies that wander into their line of sight with the added potential to stun them for the rest of the turn. However, the opposing alien team can also perform this strategy, so caution is encouraged. Before each level, the player selects up to four characters, with more becoming available as the story progresses. Each character has their own unique primary weapon that suit different play styles and strategies and a secondary sub-weapon that can be swapped between characters before each level. Every character also has a unique innate ability that remains active even during the enemy's turn, such as moving around crates, passively buffing nearby allies, or surviving potentially lethal blows. Finally, each character has a unique special move that can be used once per level and does not cost any steam. These special moves range from area-of-effect attacks to temporarily buffing or healing party members.

The main campaign is divided into chapters which are subdivided into levels, with mission objectives such as reaching the goal, saving a number of civilians, or escorting a character to safety. Throughout each level, the player can collect gears and medals scattered across the map. Gears are rarer and hidden in each level, while medals are scattered throughout and can also be earned by defeating enemies, more if they are defeated with overwatch attacks. In between levels, gears are used to unlock "boilers" that can alter characters' stats and the amount of steam available, while medals are used to unlock further sub-weapons and can be used at checkpoints mid-match to save the game, heal themselves, or restore fallen allies. Twelve playable characters are unlocked over the course of the story, but if the player manages to collect a grand total of 100,000 medals during gameplay, a thirteenth character is unlocked: a smaller version of the A.B.E. mech called "Stovepipe" (named after Lincoln's hat). Upon clearing a chapter in the campaign for the first time, that chapter can be revisited in harder challenge missions, such as by making steam and enemy health bars invisible or removing backtracking. Completing the chapter under these stipulations rewards the player with a medal bonus.

Beyond the main campaign, Code Name: S.T.E.A.M. includes local and online multiplayer with three different gameplay modes. The first is a simple deathmatch mode where two players face off with their squads of four, with the added element of a 60-second turn timer. The second is "Medal Battle", which tasks the player to collect more medals than their opponent in only 5 turns. A small medal bonus can also be earned for taking out enemy soldiers. The third is "A.B.E. Battle", which pits two players against each other in giant A.B.E. mechs in real-time combat. Matchmaking online can be done either with random people or in tournaments, and medals earned in online matches can be transferred to the main campaign. The game is also compatible with Amiibo figures, allowing players to play as Marth (voiced by Yuri Lowenthal), Ike (voiced by Jason Adkins), Robin (voiced by David Vincent), and Lucina (voiced by Laura Bailey) from the Fire Emblem series by scanning their corresponding figures. Unlike the other S.T.E.A.M. members, the Fire Emblem characters cannot be revived at checkpoints should they fall in battle, and they must be revived by scanning their respective Amiibo figures again. Additionally, the Fire Emblem characters are not involved in the main storyline, and their equipment cannot be removed or swapped out.

== Synopsis ==
The game's narrative framing device is that it is a comic book being read to the player. The story opens in a steampunk fantasy version of London on the opening day of the Steamgate Bridge. Henry Fleming (based on the protagonist of the same name from the novel The Red Badge of Courage and voiced by Adam Baldwin) is going over security detail at the American Embassy, when suddenly the city is attacked by an unknown enemy force. He manages to escape and meet up with his old friend John Henry (voiced by Michael Dorn). The two are then rescued by an airship called the Lady Liberty, captained by the once-presumed-dead President Abraham Lincoln (voiced by Wil Wheaton). He explains that the city is under attack by aliens and conscripts the two into the strike force S.T.E.A.M. (short for Strike Team Eliminating the Alien Menace).

After rescuing Queen Victoria with the help of Lion (voiced by Fred Tatasciore) from The Wonderful Wizard of Oz, Tiger Lily from Peter Pan (voiced by Kari Wahlgren), and Tom Sawyer (voiced by Jeremy Shada), the soldiers are eventually forced to leave England to its fate and retreat to America. They are delayed by a giant monster that is defeated by Lincoln himself in his giant mech, the A.B.E. (Anthropomorphized Battle Engine). They swing by Boston in order to help the forces there and meet up with Queequeg (voiced by T.J. Storm). They then receive a distress call from Professor Randolph Carter (voiced by James Urbaniak) of Miskatonic University, S.T.E.A.M.'s expert on the occult. They meet Lion's friend Scarecrow (voiced by Paul Eiding) on the way there and manage to evacuate the university with Carter in tow. However, before they can get on the Lady Liberty, Carter's notes are taken by a mysterious creature called a Starface who then flees the scene.

Carter says to Lincoln that the aliens were not just after his research, but also the Necronomicon which has led to numerous discoveries that have improved technology manifold. It was kept at Miskatonic until recently and the team sets forth for its current location: 1600 Pennsylvania Avenue, directly under the White House. They manage to get to the White House, meeting with dashing thief the Fox (voiced by Grey DeLisle) and warrior queen Califia (voiced by Kimberly Brooks). While they do keep the Necronomicon from the hands of the enemy, they unfortunately have to abandon the capital.

With the Necronomicon, Carter concludes that the source of the threat is the Great Shugguth, a creature that can perpetually create soldiers, left behind by the aliens 200 million years ago for reasons unknown. The Shugguth is buried underneath the South Pole so the team stops by Monument Valley to repair and refuel. However, their base comes under attack and they barely manage to escape with the help of the cyborg Tin Man (voiced by Andrew Kishino) and Lincoln critically injured.

When all hope seems lost, a strange light appears in the Lady Liberty, revealing none other than Dorothy Gale (voiced by Amber Hood) who takes the team to Oz which is also under attack. They save Queen Ozma whose engineers at Oz manage to upgrade A.B.E. so it is capable of drilling through the ice in the South Pole as well as giving them emerald keys so they can teleport instantly between two points in space. Returning to Earth, they hear from General Ulysses S. Grant that half the planet has been frozen over and that they are running out of time.

Fighting through the aliens' lair, they manage to confront the Starface and defeat it, though the Shugguth turns mad and goes on a rampage. Lincoln faces off against the great beast, but in its death throes it intends to take out the entire planet. Lincoln then self-destructs A.B.E., destroying the Shugguth but at the cost of his own life. With the planet saved, S.T.E.A.M. pays their final farewells to Lincoln, throwing a bouquet into the great chasm where he made his last stand and are joined by other airships doing the same. A post-credits sequence reveals Lincoln's stovepipe hat, but an emerald key is nearby, hinting that he may have survived. The comic is then turned over to its final pages, revealing a new story arc is coming.

== Development ==
This game marks the directorial debut of Paul Patrashcu, who had been with Intelligent Systems for eight years at that point. As with all of Nintendo's outside collaborations, the project was overseen by Nintendo's Software Planning & Development division under veteran producer Hitoshi Yamagami, who also oversees development of series such as Fire Emblem, Pokémon, and Xenoblade Chronicles. The first pitch began with the words "Steampunk Civil War", according to the director's explanation at Nintendo's E3 2014 developer roundtable where the game was first unveiled to the press.

Yamagami and Patrashcu, the latter of whom had a personal fondness for strategy games, wanted to make a game that was accessible to a broader group of people who previously found strategy games unappealing by removing certain abstractions that had been established in the genre, such as a heavy reliance on overhead maps and a general distance from the character units themselves. Thus the idea was born to use an over-the-shoulder third-person camera that would serve as the player's only way of seeing around the map, directly putting them in the respective character's shoes. That is also where the influence from third-person shooter games comes into play, with the direct control over the aiming reticle of the character's guns being in the player's hands, just like in a traditional shooter game. All of these mechanics were blended together under the familiar turn-based system of other strategy games, like Intelligent Systems's own Fire Emblem and Advance Wars series, or contemporaries such as XCOM and Valkyria Chronicles, resulting in a strategy game which aims to offer both a lot of depth and be welcoming to previously disinterested players.

Takao Sakai, the game's art director, explained that the art style was heavily influenced by the Silver Age of comic books, such as the works of Jack Kirby as well as more recent comic creators like Bruce Timm and Mike Mignola. The designs for the enemy alien characters were heavily influenced by the works of H. P. Lovecraft.

== Reception ==
Reception

Aggregate scores
| Aggregator | Score |
|---|---|
| GameRankings | 68.62% (36 reviews) |
| Metacritic | 69/100 (63 reviews) |

Review scores
| Publication | Score |
|---|---|
| Destructoid | 6.5/10 |
| Game Informer | 8/10 |
| GameRevolution | 4/5 |
| GameSpot | 4/10 |
| GameTrailers | 8/10 |
| IGN | 7.9/10 |
| Polygon | 3.5/10; 6/10 (updated) |

Code Name: S.T.E.A.M. has earned aggregate critic scores of 68% from GameRankings and a 69 out of 100 from Metacritic, indicating "mixed or average" reception. Ben Moore from GameTrailers called it "a complex game that's hard to put down," praising the varied gameplay and character progression systems, and the game's "absurd moments that keep things entertaining". GameRevolution's Ryan Bates enjoyed the level strategy that fans of the genre will "eat up" while "non-strategy gamers will find it easier to understand and get into than other current offerings". Henry Gilbert from GamesRadar praised the design and setting of a "unique world full of memorable characters," the gameplay mechanics, and "the odd team of steampunk weirdos really mixes up the gameplay to make for some impactful action, and the dense maps belie a raft of colorful design". Kimberley Wallace from Game Informer said the game's "biggest assets are its variety and unpredictability" in missions and strategies. IGN's Jose Otero enjoyed the design of the characters and gameplay options, calling the arsenal itself "wacky, but also extremely deep," though he felt that the enemies were less memorable visually than the playable characters. Otero noted the lack of an overhead map or view feature, feeling that it made players "have to think carefully" to avoid ambushes and make counters.

Austin Walker from GameSpot considered the lack of an overhead option as encouraging a "slow, dreary march forward" approach, while deeming the level design "uninspired" and the story "underdeveloped," as it "turns its back ... in favor of pure aestheticization". Kyle MacGregor from Destructoid enjoyed the gameplay as "a heady, engrossing experience" yet was critical of the enemy turns having a protracted length, being "hellaciously long". Justin McElroy from Polygon called the gameplay "annoying" and admitted that he didn't finish the game, calling it a "misguided, horrifically dull debacle". Nintendo would later release an update that addressed significant downtime by allowing the player to fast-forward through enemy turns. As such, McElroy updated his review to be more favorable towards the game, stating that it was "a whole lot easier to deal with its faults after the patch and, by extension, a whole lot easier to recommend" the game.

In its first week on sale in Japan, Code Name: S.T.E.A.M. sold fewer than 1,865 copies at retail.

== Legacy ==
Code Name: S.T.E.A.M. was the first video game to debut Marth's current English voice actor, Yuri Lowenthal, who has since reprised his role in all future English-speaking appearances.

The game also received minor representation in the 2018 Nintendo Switch crossover fighting game Super Smash Bros. Ultimate. Henry Fleming appears as a Spirit and four music tracks from the game were included, including three tracks based on themes from the Fire Emblem series.
