= Robin (Fire Emblem) =

Video game character

- Fire Emblem character
- Male (left) and female (right) Robin, as they appear in Super Smash Bros. for Nintendo 3DS and Wii U
- First game: Fire Emblem Awakening (2012)
- Created by: Kouhei Maeda; Genki Yokota
- Designed by: Kusakihara; Yūsuke Kozaki
- Voiced by: English: Male: David Vincent Christopher Corey Smith (Awakening) Brandom Karrer (Awakening) Female: Michelle Ruff (Awakening) Wendee Lee (Awakening) Lauren Landa (2014-present); Japanese: Male: Yoshimasa Hosoya Toru Okawa (Awakening) Miyuki Sawashiro (Heroes, Young) Female: Miyuki Sawashiro

In-universe information
- Occupation: Tactician
- Nationality: Plegia

Robin, (Note: Known in Japan by the default name of Reflet (ルフレ, Rufure) and in non-English European countries by the default name of Daraen) also known in the game as Avatar, is a player avatar from Nintendo's Fire Emblem video game series, who first appeared in Fire Emblem Awakening as its lead character. In the story of Fire Emblem Awakening, the Avatar awakens in a grassy field and is found by Chrom and his sister Lissa, but has amnesia. Despite this, Robin is a skilled fighter and serves as the main tactician in the army. Robin is the eventual parent of Morgan and the child of Validar. Following their appearance in Awakening, Robin received more widespread attention from their playable appearances, including the Super Smash Bros. series.

== Conception and design ==
Robin was designed by Kusakihara and Yūsuke Kozaki. Two key story themes while developing Fire Emblem Awakening were the love for the characters and the bonds between characters developing over the course of the story, with the latter expressed in gameplay through the cooperative behavior of adjacent characters. While voice acting was included, it was limited to snappy lines meant to evoke a certain feeling because the team had concerns about the amount of content in the game, which would increase with full voice acting, and its effect on pacing. Special voice-overs and visuals were created for the character "confession" sequences. All the main characters, including Robin, had a personalized backstory, and appropriate personalities were chosen for them. A large team of writers were employed to create the character dialogue, and a story bible containing the character's personality traits was created for them to work from. While developing the playable and enemy characters, the team factored in feedback from fans saying that they should name all characters, even foot soldiers. Wanting to give the impression of every character having their own lives, they created full artwork for all characters. Creating the characters proved to be one of the hardest parts of development. Kozaki was also responsible for creating the 2D artwork which represented the characters during conversations.

The concept for the character's graphics on the map underwent changes. Initially, some of the team felt that accurately displaying a character's equipment and class would be enough, but later it was decided to give them all individual characteristics. They were also able to add more unique character expressions than previous Fire Emblem games, enabling a greater emotional range during dramatic scenes.

== Appearances ==
Robin is an avatar character whose name, gender, and appearance can be customized by the player. In the original timeline, the evil Dragon Grima possesses Robin and kills Chrom. When Lucina escapes to the past, Grima of that timeline follows them and tried to fill the present Robin with his memories; however, Robin's body was not strong enough to retain the memories, weakening Grima's power and giving Robin amnesia. As a result of Grima attempting to give them his memories, they occasionally get visions of their future self's memories, resulting in migraines.

The male version of Robin appears in Fire Emblem Fates as a playable character after using the Robin amiibo. He first appears awakening in the player's Castle, wondering what happened to him, and then thanks Corrin for waking him and introduces himself. Male Robin also appeared in Fire Emblem Engage as a DLC Emblem alongside Chrom as the "Emblem of Bonds". Variants of Robin also appear in the spinoff game Fire Emblem Warriors and Fire Emblem Heroes.

Outside of the Fire Emblem series, Robin is featured in Nintendo's Super Smash Bros. crossover fighting game series, promoted as a character who is unlike any other sword fighter due to their mastery of magical tomes and the Levin sword. They first appear as a playable character in Super Smash Bros. for Nintendo 3DS and Wii U, and return as an unlockable character in Super Smash Bros. Ultimate. To coincide with their appearance in Super Smash Bros., Amiibo figures featuring the male version of Robin were released. In response to complaints from fans that there are too many Fire Emblem characters, Sakurai assured that the development team would ensure each of the game's characters would be balanced properly.

== Critical reception ==
Melanie Zawodniak of Nintendo World Report proclaimed Robin to be the best Fire Emblem player avatar in the Fire Emblem series. She further stated that "Robin became such a memorable and iconic character to Awakening's story that they would eventually be added to Super Smash Bros. as a playable fighter." In North American Fire Emblem character popularity polls running up to the release of Fire Emblem Heroes, the male version of Robin placed eighth while the female version is slightly less popular. When a female Robin was announced as an addition to Fire Emblem Warriors, Mike Sounders of Destructoid noted that a male version already exists and that she is a "waste of a slot" in the game if implemented as a standalone character and not just an alternate costume to her male counterpart.

Robin's presence in the Super Smash Bros'. series has received varied commentary. Steven Hansen of Destructoid praised Robin's addition in Super Smash Bros. for Nintendo 3DS and Wii U and called character's element "unique". As part of John Adam's research into player perceptions of femininity concerning female Super Smash Bros. characters within the player community, he found the language that was used when discussing the female version of Robin was "less sexualized", but he also noted that multiple people described her as "cute", with one male player felt "like a stronger character in her own right." Gavin Jasper of Den of Geek was agreeable to Robin's addition, noting that their abilities as a spellcaster was a point of difference to the excessive number of normal-looking human characters fighting with swords in Smash Bros., or to other Fire Emblem characters with similar abilities in the series. Cecilia D'Anastasio from Kotaku concurred that Robin at least has a distinct moveset which revolve around magic tomes. Commenting on Robin's 44th-place ranking on a 2018 list of Smash playable characters published by Polygon, Jeremy Parish criticized Robin as just a "big nerd who attacks with books." Michael Kelly from Dot Esports described Robin as one of the worst characters to play in Ultimate as of April 2021 due to their underwhelming gameplay attributes, noting that they are one of the least selected characters in competitive-level matches as a result.
