= Fire Emblem Awakening =

2012 video game

- North American cover art featuring various members of the main cast
- Developer: Intelligent Systems
- Publisher: Nintendo
- Directors: Kouhei Maeda; Genki Yokota
- Producers: Toru Narihiro; Hitoshi Yamagami
- Designer: Yuji Ohashi
- Programmers: Takafumi Kaneko; Yuji Ohashi
- Artists: Toshiyuki Kusakihara; Yūsuke Kozaki
- Writers: Kouhei Maeda; Nami Komuro; Masayuki Horikawa; Yuichi Kitaoka; Sou Mayumi; Shuntaro Ashida
- Composers: Hiroki Morishita; Rei Kondoh
- Series: Fire Emblem
- Platform: Nintendo 3DS
- Release: JP: April 19, 2012; NA: February 4, 2013; PAL: April 19, 2013
- Genre: Tactical role-playing
- Modes: Single-player, multiplayer

Fire Emblem Awakening (Note: Known in Japan as Fire Emblem Kakusei (Japanese: ファイアーエムブレム 覚醒, Hepburn: Faiā Emuburemu Kakusei)) is a tactical role-playing game developed by Intelligent Systems and published by Nintendo for the Nintendo 3DS. The game was released in Japan in April 2012 and North America and PAL regions in early 2013. It is an installment of the Fire Emblem series, (Note: It is variously called the eleventh, thirteenth including remakes, and fourteenth including all titles released at the time.) and the first to be developed for the 3DS. The gameplay, like previous Fire Emblem games, focuses on the tactical movement of characters across a grid-based battlefield and fighting enemy units. Other features include the ability to build and foster relationships between characters to improve their abilities and multiple camera perspectives in battle.

The story is set 2000 years after the events of the original Fire Emblem and Fire Emblem Gaiden and focuses on Chrom, the prince of Ylisse, and his personal army, the "Shepherds". They rescue Robin, an amnesiac Avatar whose name, gender, and appearance can be customized by the player, and who takes on the role of their tactician. Over the course of the story, Chrom's army travels across Ylisse and defends it from undead invaders called the Risen and attacks from the hostile nation of Plegia.

Development of Fire Emblem Awakening began in 2010, with multiple veterans of the Fire Emblem series filling key development roles. Development was handled by Intelligent Systems with supervision from Nintendo. As the series had seen declining sales with previous installments, Awakening was designed as the possible last entry in the series, incorporating elements from all previous Fire Emblem games. Due to the 3DS still being fine-tuned by developers, the team's decisions for content and graphics were made based on what they thought was feasible on the hardware.

Upon release, Fire Emblem Awakening received critical acclaim and strong sales worldwide, with many critics praising its overall presentation, story, cast of characters, new additions to the traditional gameplay and accessibility to newcomers. However, some gameplay options and proposals were met with mixed reception, such as the option to disable permanent character death, colloquially known as permadeath, a staple of the franchise. The game was nominated for multiple awards from video game publications, and is often cited as one of the best games on the 3DS and one of the greatest video games of all time. Its commercial success is also credited with boosting sales for the 3DS and ensuring the continuation of the Fire Emblem series. It was followed by Fire Emblem Fates in 2015.

== Gameplay ==
In Fire Emblem Awakening, the player begins as one of the central characters, a customizable Avatar: while the character's default name is Robin, their name, gender, hair color, features, and voice can all be customized. There are two modes of play: Casual Mode and Classic Mode. In Classic Mode, characters defeated in battle are permanently dead and unable to be used for the rest of the game. Casual Mode enables the player to disable permanent character deaths, with fallen units being restored after the completion of a battle. When Chrom or the Avatar character dies in battle in any mode, the player receives a "Game Over" message and must restart the battle. The game has multiple difficulty levels, with the three standard modes being Normal, Hard and Lunatic; a fourth difficulty level, Lunatic+, is unlocked after completing the game on Lunatic mode. The playing mode and difficulty level are selected at the beginning of a new game.

After the player is given access to a party of characters, they travel across a world map to both new and old locations. The time of day on the world map is synced to the player's time zone and time of day. New locations can contain main story missions as well as side stories, where new characters can be recruited. Previously visited locations have shops where the player can acquire new weapons, and can also contain random enemy skirmishes. Between missions, players can go to a customizable central base called the Barracks, where they can watch scenes between characters and perform various activities. Excluding characters included in downloadable content, the player can recruit forty-nine characters; twenty-eight in the main story and twenty-one in Paralogues. The game features multiple uses of the Nintendo 3DS-exclusive SpotPass and StreetPass functions via the world map. During navigation, the player can encounter other players and interact with them via StreetPass. The player can do battle with a party of up to ten characters from another player's world, with the winner gaining access to the party. Avatars can also be either befriended or defeated in battle, and loaned out to other players using this function.

=== Battle system ===
Screenshot of a battle in Fire Emblem Awakening, showing two characters about to fight one another. The basic mechanics of the battle system are all displayed.

Awakening uses a turn-based tactical role-playing battle system. The terrain is displayed on the top screen of the 3DS, while unit information is displayed on the bottom screen. Before each battle, the player selects a limited number of characters from their roster for use in battle, which can either be controlled manually or through an auto-battle option. Character movement is dictated by a tile-based movement system. During combat, player-controlled sprite characters and enemy units controlled by the game's artificial intelligence (AI) each get one turn where they position their units, with an additional turn being added when unaffiliated AI-controlled units are in the field. Playable characters positioned next to each other in the field will support one-another, granting buffs, and performing actions such as blocking attacks. Two characters can also pair up as a single mobile unit, enabling both to attack at once. As the relationship between characters strengthens, they gain greater bonuses to their strength and effectiveness when paired up in battle. During combat, the perspective switches to a 3D scene between combatants; optional camera angles, including a first-person view through the eyes of playable characters, can be activated using the 3DS stylus.

During battles, characters earn experience points (EXP) through successful actions during battle. Their level raises by one once they earn 100 EXP, and as their level increases their stats increase and they learn new skills. The game includes a character class system, with forty-two classes available in the base game. Each character, including the Avatar, has a starting class, and upon reaching Level 10, they can either upgrade or change their classes using special items called Master Seals and Second Seals. A Master Seal promotes the character's class, improving character stats and giving access to new ability sets or weapons. A Second Seal allows a character to change class, or "reclass", when they are either at Level 10 or have reached their current Advanced Class. Upon reclassing, a character's experience level is reset to Level 1, but they retain their stats and abilities. The classes that most characters can reclass into are limited, but the Avatar is able to reclass into any class available to their gender. Regardless of future changes, characters retain learned skills from earlier classes. A character's class affects both their attack capabilities and their mobility on the battlefield: for example, mages and archers can attack at greater ranges than melee units, mounted units have more powerful attacks than foot units, and flying units have greater mobility and range.

Relationships between characters are built up through Support conversations between chapters. The normal rankings of relationships are C to A, with A standing for a close friendship. For characters of opposing genders, an additional S ranking is available, in which they fall in love, marry and have children. Relationships also have a direct impact during battles, with certain character pairings granting positive effects such as increased mobility or an automatic guarding action. A couple's children can be found and recruited in optional chapters made available by the parent characters' marriage, with their appearance and in-game abilities varying depending on their parents. Most characters have a specific list of units which they can have Support conversations with; the Avatar can build a relationship with all characters, and, depending on their chosen sex, marry any unit from any generation as long as they are not a direct descendant.

== Synopsis ==
=== Setting and characters ===
The game takes place approximately 2000 years after the events of Fire Emblem: Shadow Dragon and the Blade of Light and Gaiden. In ancient times, the Fell Dragon Grima attempted to destroy the world. To stop Grima, the Divine Dragon Naga chose the ruler of the Halidom of Ylisse, known as the First Exalt. She granted him power through two magical objects, forged from her fangs: Falchion, a sword with the power to slay dragons; and the Fire Emblem, a magical shield. The Exalt struck down Grima, sending it into a long slumber. In the time since then, the continents of Archanea and Valentia became known as Ylisse and Valm.

By the present time, the land of Ylisse is divided between three countries. These are Halidom of Ylisse, which continues to worship Naga and is ruled by Exalt Emmeryn and defended by the Shepherds; the kingdom of Plegia, which worships Grima; and Regna Ferox, a country whose rulers periodically compete for dominance. Fifteen years prior to Awakening, the last Exalt of Ylisse, Emmeryn's father, waged a religious war against Plegia, which greatly damaged both countries and left bitterness on both sides. Ylisse has slowly recovered from the war thanks to Emmeryn's peaceful actions.

=== Plot ===
After dreaming of killing Chrom, an amnesiac Robin awakens in a field, where Chrom and members of his personal army, the Shepherds, find and take them in. The Avatar joins the Shepherds after exhibiting the qualities of a tactician when they defend a nearby town from Plegian bandits. After gaining an alliance with Regna Ferox, the Shepherds move to fight Plegia's forces and revenant monsters called the Risen, and are aided by a masked man calling himself "Marth". After a confrontation between Plegia and the Shepherds, Validar and his minions almost kill Emmeryn. However, the assassination plot is foiled with aid from "Marth", who has prior knowledge of the event and is revealed to be a woman. Soon after, Plegian forces capture Emmeryn as she goes to parley with King Gangrel, Plegia's ruler, with Gangrel demanding the Fire Emblem in exchange for her life. Though Chrom almost accepts Gangrel's terms, Emmeryn stops him by throwing herself over a cliff, becoming a martyr to both Ylisse and Plegia. Eventually, the Shepherds triumph over Plegia, defeating Gangrel and restoring peace to the continent.

Two years after Gangrel's defeat, Chrom inherits the throne of Ylisse, marries, and fathers a newborn daughter named Lucina. He leads the Shepherds again when Emperor Walhart of Valm threatens to invade Ylisse, and during the campaign "Marth" returns and reveals to Chrom that she is actually Lucina. She hails from an alternate timeline in a future where Grima has been resurrected, and she used a time traveling spell that Naga devised to return to the past and prevent the events leading to her future. To combat Grima, Chrom must perform the "Awakening", a ritual that grants him Naga's power, by combining the Fire Emblem with five magical gems divided among the nations. During and after the war in Valm, the Shepherds manage to retrieve four of the gemstones, but Validar, the new king of Plegia and Robin's father, ambushes them after offering them the last gemstone. Validar takes control of Robin and steals the Fire Emblem from Chrom, and reveals that Robin was born as the ideal vessel for Grima. Lucina realizes that Grima used Robin to kill Chrom in her timeline, and attempts to execute them. Chrom forces her to stand down, remaining confident that Robin can overcome Grima's control; alternatively, if Robin is Lucina's husband or mother, Lucina is unable to go through with it and stands down on her own. The Shepherds manage to track down Validar, who uses Robin to attack Chrom, mirroring the events of the "invisible Ties" premonition. However, Robin uses his/her foreknowledge to prevent Chrom's death, allowing the Shepherds to kill Validar and recover the Fire Emblem.

A possessed Robin from Lucina's future appears, revealing that the present timeline Robin's amnesia was caused by Grima's unsuccessful attempt to possess them. The future Robin then uses the power gathered for Grima's resurrection to restore his dragon form. Chrom performs the Awakening and summons Naga, who reveals that although he now has the power to stop Grima, she only has enough power to put him to sleep for another thousand years. She tells him that the only way to truly destroy Grima is to have Robin kill him, which would result in Robin's death as well. She adds that Robin may survive if his/her bond with Chrom and the Shepherds is strong enough. In the final battle, the Shepherds manage to weaken Grima and Chrom, who is opposed to the Avatar's sacrifice, offers to deliver the final blow. Depending on the player's final choice, the game will reach one of two different endings. If Chrom deals the final blow, Grima is put back to sleep for another thousand years, though the Avatar is left with regrets. If Robin deals the final blow, both they and Grima die. Despite this, Chrom and the Shepherds refuse to believe that Robin is dead, and vow to find them and bring them home. In a post-credits scene, Robin awakens in a field similar to the beginning of the game, where Chrom and Lissa find them and welcome them home.

== Development ==
The original planning for Fire Emblem Awakening began in 2010, when Nintendo SPD director Genki Yokota was finishing his work on the Wii game Xenoblade Chronicles. The game was developed by regular Fire Emblem developer Intelligent Systems. Among the staff members were veterans of the Fire Emblem series, including project manager Masahiro Higuchi, who had first worked on Fire Emblem: Genealogy of the Holy War, and Intelligent Systems producer Kouhei Maeda, who first worked as a scenario writer for Fire Emblem: The Binding Blade. The first proposals were made after the completion of Fire Emblem: New Mystery of the Emblem, a remake for the Nintendo DS of the third installment. Development was very slow for the first year, during which time producer Hitoshi Yamagami organized the game's development structure. Once this was completed, he handed the main production duties over to co-director Genki Yokota. The art director was Toshiyuki Kusakihara. Character designs were done by Kusakihara and Yūsuke Kozaki. Kusakihara was brought on board to offer a fresh perspective on the Fire Emblem series and new ideas for the team, while Kozaki was brought in to help create a distinctive art style that would be well-received overseas, as had his previous work for the Wii title No More Heroes. During development, Kusakihara and Kozaki had lengthy meetings about various aspects of the game. These meetings became so time-consuming that Kusakihara compared his situation to the legend of Urashima Tarō.

Due to declining sales of the series, the developers were told by Nintendo that Awakening would be the last Fire Emblem game if it failed to sell above 250,000 units. This caused panic for the team, with them considering including a high number of elements new to the game. Among the concepts were a modern-day setting or using the planet Mars as a setting. Eventually, the team decided that these elements would alienate rather than attract players and stuck to the medieval setting and style of previous Fire Emblem titles. As a compromise, the team decided to make it the "culmination" of all the games in Fire Emblem series to that point, incorporating gameplay elements from multiple titles. This approach was approved by the team and the proposal was completed within a month, though the decision also created difficulties with choosing which elements to include, and how to balance them so they did not clash with one another. The game's final title, "Awakening", was born from this concept of an ultimate Fire Emblem game. It was initially just casually suggested by Yamagami when discussing ideas for a title with Yokota, and Yokota liked it. As development progressed, the team continued to come up with ideas that increased workload, but they maintained a positive attitude and pushed forward in spite of the consequent pressures. Internally, the game was known as "Fire Emblem Fin: The Children from the Brink".

Maeda was mainly responsible for the original scenario, thinking out the rough outline before the team created the events of each chapter in detail. Some plot points, such as the true identity of "Marth", were planned from an early stage, while many of the other plot twists came about during its development. Many of them were added at the suggestion of team members from both Intelligent Systems and Nintendo. Two key story themes while developing the game were the love for the characters, and the bonds characters developed over the course of the story. The latter theme was expressed in gameplay through the cooperative behavior of adjacent characters. While voice acting was included, it was limited to snappy lines meant to evoke a certain feeling. This was because the team had concerns about the amount of content in the game, which would increase a great deal with full voice acting, and its effect on the pacing. The team also used many well-known English and Japanese voice actors for the characters. Special voice overs and visuals were created for the character "confession" sequences. All the main characters had a personalized backstory, and appropriate personalities were chosen for them. The first one to be finalized was the child character Inigo, who was created by character planner Nami Kumoru. A large team of writers were employed to create the character dialogue, and a story bible containing the characters' personality traits was created for the writers to work from. While developing the playable and enemy characters, the team used feedback from fans saying they should name all the characters, including foot soldiers. Wanting to give the impression of every character having their own lives, they created full artwork for all characters. Creating the characters proved to be one of the hardest parts of development. While designing the characters, Kozaki took their backstories into account: for example, the thief character Gaius was drawn with a sack of sweets, as he had a love for them. Kozaki was also responsible for creating the 2D artwork which represented the characters during conversations. The soundtrack was composed by Hiroki Morishita and Rei Kondoh.

=== Design ===
The game's optional first-person perspective during battle, one of the several features new to the Fire Emblem series, was included to increase player freedom and show off the platform's 3D effects.

Once Nintendo gave the go-ahead for development, Intelligent Systems formed a small internal development team to handle the project. Awakening was the first Fire Emblem game for the Nintendo 3DS. The platform was as yet unreleased and still undergoing final development. Because of this, the team had a large number of ideas for features to include, but they also only had a limited idea of what the system was capable of. Consequently, they had difficulties deciding how the 2D sprites and 3D environments would interact with each other, and ensuring they did not clip through objects. One notable feature missing from in-game character models was their feet. The original idea was to add a unique and uniform deformation to characters. As the team did not have much knowledge of the platform's CPU strength, the number of character bones they could include were intentionally limited. This meant that the bones needed for the operation of ankles and feet were omitted. Later, it was discovered that ankles and feet could be included, but the team decided to leave that for a future game if it came to pass. A different explanation was that the team wanted players to focus on the top half of characters, so made their heads the largest part of their character models while shrinking their feet.

The concept for character graphics on the map underwent changes. Initially, some of the team felt that accurately displaying a character's equipment and class would be enough, but later it was decided to give them all individual characteristics. They were also able to add more unique character expressions than previous Fire Emblem games, enabling a greater emotional range during scenes of drama. A different element was the environmental effects the team incorporated, such as dust clouds when characters performed actions in battle. For the full-motion cutscenes, the team wanted to create a sense of grandeur and spectacle, using the openings of Taiga drama series as inspiration. Japanese animation company Kamikaze Douga was in charge of supervising the production and art assets of the game's cutscenes. Cutscene animation was handled by Studio Anima. According to team members, their request to Studio Anima was to make the world "come alive" during the full-motion sequences, which were included at crucial moments in the plot.

The first part of the game to receive full attention from the team was the gameplay. As a test map, the team used the opening map for Mystery of the Emblem. One of the early options was switching between 16x16 and 24x24 pixel characters depending on the camera's overhead distance. In the end, the team used a hardware-based scaling system instead of switching between graphics types so as to keep the frame rate consistent in battle. While designing the levels, the team created both maps with a plot-driven structure and maps that allowed for player freedom. An aspect of the battle system new to the series was the inclusion of an optional first-person viewpoint during battles. This was done with western players in mind, as developers wanted to both give players an option on their perspective in battle and demonstrate the platform's 3D effects. The difficulty levels proved a point of debate amongst the team, ranging from the naming of difficulties to whether to include the ability to adjust it on the fly, which some felt was contrary to Fire Emblem traditions. There was also debate about both the inclusion and mechanics of the marriage system. While some aspects went smoothly, there was contention about the ability to marry any of the characters, and Kusakihara's suggestion of having characters kissing at the conclusion of each romance was vetoed by the team. An effort was made to make the interface and graphics easy for players to understand. An example of this was the cursor, which in previous games had been a triangular shape and for Awakening was changed to a pointing hand. One of the more controversial ideas that made it into the final game was the "Casual Mode", first introduced in New Mystery of the Emblem to give the player the option to play with or without permadeath. Initially opposed by staff members at Nintendo and Intelligent Systems, Yamagami and others successfully defended its inclusion. Yamagami's stance was that modern gamers would not be pleased with needing to invest extra time because a character had died. In another interview, team members said that Awakening was the first time the team conformed to the popular image of Nintendo games being easy to play and user-friendly.

== Release ==
The game was announced in September 2011, and was released in Japan on April 19, 2012, in North America on February 4, 2013, and in Europe and Austriasia on April 19, 2013. As a promotion, Nintendo released a limited-edition Nintendo 3DS bundle with Awakening pre-installed. The game's English localization took approximately one year and was handled collaboratively by Nintendo of America and independent video game localization company 8-4, who previously localized Fire Emblem: Shadow Dragon. The game also included Japanese voice tracks for its English release. Like in Japan, a limited 3DS bundle with Awakening pre-installed was created for North America and Europe, with Europe also receiving the 3DS XL model as part of the bundle.

=== Downloadable content ===
Fire Emblem Awakening was the first packaged title released by Nintendo to receive downloadable content (DLC) after launch, taking the form of additional maps and characters from previous entries in the Fire Emblem series. The idea for DLC content came up when the game was close to completion. Due to this, the team could not do anything that would invalidate the main story. For the additional playable characters, the team focused on the main cast, picked out the most suitable, and left the final choice to Maeda. Starting from the game's release, over twenty different playable maps were released over several months at the rate of one map per week. Nintendo decided to release downloadable content for the game in all available regions. After it becomes available, the DLC can be accessed using the game's SpotPass system: within the context of the game's world, after a certain point in the game, the characters can access an area called the Outrealm Gate, being transported to the DLC maps. Various artists have contributed illustrations for the downloadable characters, including those who have worked on previous titles, such as Senri Kita, and newcomers, such as Kimihiko Fujisaka. One of the DLC maps received censorship upon release in North America, with a shot of female character Tharja altered to hide her underwear.

== Reception ==
Reception

Aggregate score
Aggregator	Score
Metacritic	92/100 (72 reviews)

Review scores
Publication	Score
1Up.com	A−
Destructoid	9/10
Electronic Gaming Monthly	9/10
Eurogamer	10/10
Famitsu	36/40
Game Informer	9/10
GameSpot	8.5/10
GamesRadar+	4.5/5
GameTrailers	8.5/10
IGN	9.6/10
Nintendo Life	9/10
Nintendo World Report	9.5/10
Polygon	8.5/10

Fire Emblem Awakening has received widespread critical acclaim, holding an aggregate score of 92/100 on Metacritic, based on 72 reviews. After its release, Awakening was placed on GameSpot's list of the best games on the 3DS, and reached second place on a similar list by GameTrailers. IGN included the game on two different lists: it reached #2 on their list of the top 25 Nintendo 3DS games, and #21 on their list of the top 125 Nintendo games of all time. Slant Magazine's staff ranked it the eleventh best video game of 2013.

Famitsu said in its review that the game could be enjoyed by hardcore fans and newcomers alike, as it made accommodations for both, and particularly praised the new gameplay features. IGN's Audrey Drake called Awakening "the most fluid and stunning strategy RPG experience available on a portable, and features the best storytelling and production value of any 3DS game to date." Jeremy Parish, writing for 1UP.com, said that though the Fire Emblem series had changed little over the years while holding a place of respect within the genre, the changes Intelligent Systems implemented made Awakening "an engrossing title that should enjoy impressive shelf life." His main criticism was against the enemy AI, which occasionally unbalanced the gameplay. Ray Carsillo of Electronic Gaming Monthly, while sharing Parish's opinion on the lack of a restart option, called Awakening "probably the best Fire Emblem to come to the States yet." While Eurogamer's Rich Stanton, giving the game a perfect score, called it "a special game", praising its story themes and how it made him care about his characters.

GameTrailers said that the game "takes positive strides forward with new additions like enhancements to the social system and battle mechanics, and the series’ established formula is all the better for it." Despite feeling mixed about the interface and multiplayer, GameSpot's Heidi Kemps called Awakening the best installment in the series for some time. Alexa Ray Corriea, writing for Polygon, said that the development team had "added just enough to the time-tested Fire Emblem formula to bolster its challenges without cutting away its roots." Game Informer's Kimberley Wallace said that "[Awakening] made me scratch and claw for victory, and I savored every moment." Chris Carter of Destructoid, similar to Famitsu, recommended it to old and new players, saying: "If you've been itching to get into a Fire Emblem game, this is a great place to start. If you've been playing them all along, you'll feel right at home."

A blacksmith known online as Man at Arms received a large amount of media attention when he created a replica of Chrom's Falchion sword from the game.

=== Awards ===
Awakening was nominated for multiple awards after release. At the 2012 Famitsu Awards 2012, Awakening was among the games awarded the magazine's Excellence Award. In the West, it was nominated in the "Best RPG" category at the Spike Video Game Awards 2013. It was nominated in multiple categories in Destructoid's 2013 Game of the Year awards, including Game of the Year, Best Role-Playing Game, Best Story, and Best Soundtrack. It was also nominated for GameSpot's Game of the Year 2013 in the Nintendo 3DS category. In IGN's Best of 2013 awards, it won in both the Best 3DS Strategy Game and Best 3DS Story categories. At the Game Developers Choice Awards 2014, it was nominated in the Best Handheld/Mobile Game category. During the 17th Annual D.I.C.E. Awards, the Academy of Interactive Arts & Sciences nominated Fire Emblem Awakening for "Handheld Game of the Year" and "Strategy/Simulation Game of the Year".

=== Sales ===
The game's Japanese launch saw incredible sales figures, being the fastest-selling entry in the series since detailed weekly tallies began. During its opening week, the game managed to sell 242,600 units, reaching the top of the sales charts and beating the debut sales of the previous two Fire Emblem releases. It sold through 81.63% of its initial shipment, causing sell-outs in some stores. Japanese sales tracker Media Create attributed the initial high sales to Nintendo's promotional campaign and a five-year wait between releases. Demand for the limited Japanese bundle also exceeded Nintendo's expectations, as the pre-order website crashed from the number of people trying to buy it. As marketing the game as any product other than a limited edition would have violated a Japanese commercial law, Nintendo were unable to reopen the pre-orders after the initial sales period despite complaints. By the beginning of 2013, the game had sold 455,268 units, placing it among the top 30 high-selling titles for 2012. In addition to the main game, Nintendo reported that 1.2 million units of downloadable content had been sold by September 2012, bringing in an additional 380 million yen (about $4.8 million).

Sales in the West were equally strong. During its first month on sale in North America, the game sold 180,000 units, with 63,000 units of the total sales being eShop downloads. These figures gave Awakening the best ever first month sales for the franchise in North America. Sales continued to rise in the coming months, with the total figure reaching 240,000 units by April, including a further 20,000 digital sales. By September, total sales in North America had reached 390,000 units. In the UK, Awakening debuted in third place on the charts behind Injustice: Gods Among Us and BioShock Infinite. The game and the hardware bundle collectively boosted sales of the 3DS and 3DS XL by nearly 50% over the previous week. As of January 2017, the game has sold-through 1.9 million copies worldwide, with 500,000 copies sold in Japan and 1.4 million copies elsewhere.

== Legacy ==
The game's strong sales, well exceeding the initial figures set by Nintendo during production, ensured that the Fire Emblem series would not be canceled. In January 2015, a new Fire Emblem title created for the Nintendo 3DS by the same core team as Awakening, Fire Emblem Fates, was announced for a worldwide release. The success of Awakening has been credited with popularizing the platform among other Japanese RPG publishers, such as Square Enix and Atlus.

Awakening's success has also resulted in characters making appearances in other Nintendo games. Two of the game's main characters, Lucina and Robin, were featured in the 2014 crossover fighting games Super Smash Bros. for Nintendo 3DS and Wii U. Chrom was considered for the game but was deemed too similar to other Fire Emblem characters on the roster at the time, so his appearance was relegated to small non-playable cameos. However, he was finally made playable in the franchise's next entry Super Smash Bros. Ultimate by popular request, particularly from within Japan. His inclusion contributed to a sentiment of there being too many Fire Emblem characters in the series, as well as criticisms for being too similar to other Fire Emblem characters. A stage based on Arena Ferox was also included, along with a selection of music tracks from Awakening.

Lucina and Robin were also made available as playable characters in Code Name: S.T.E.A.M., Fire Emblem Fates, and (albeit temporarily) Fire Emblem Echoes: Shadows of Valentia for those who scanned their Amiibo figures. Costumes based on Chrom and Lucina are also available in Capcom's Monster Hunter Frontier G video game, in a cross-promotion done with Nintendo. A free downloadable content mission allowed the characters in Fates to visit the setting of Awakening, mere moments before the latter's campaign began in earnest. During promotion for Fates, a Fire Emblem-themed trading card game was released. A set themed after Awakening includes a code to download Lucina as a playable character in Fates. Chrom and Lucina are both playable units in Project X Zone 2, and multiple characters from Awakening are featured in Tokyo Mirage Sessions ♯FE, a crossover with Atlus's Megami Tensei mega-franchise. Chrom also cameos as a guest character in the Nintendo-published mobile game Dragalia Lost. Characters from Awakening prominently appear as playable units in the crossover spinoff titles Fire Emblem Heroes and Fire Emblem Warriors, with the latter title launching alongside the first Chrom Amiibo figure. A second Chrom Amiibo figure for the Super Smash Bros. lineup was released on November 15, 2019.
