= Fire Emblem Fates =

2015 video game

- Packaging artwork for the special edition of Fates, featuring the complete main cast
- Developer: Intelligent Systems (Note: Co-produced and supervised by Nintendo Software Planning & Development.)
- Publisher: Nintendo
- Directors: Kouhei Maeda; Genki Yokota
- Producers: Masahiro Higuchi; Hitoshi Yamagami
- Designers: Yuji Ohashi; Masayuki Horikawa; Ryuichiro Koguchi
- Programmers: Takafumi Kaneko; Yuji Ohashi
- Artists: Toshiyuki Kusakihara; Yūsuke Kozaki
- Writers: Shin Kibayashi; Yukinori Kitajima; Nami Komuro
- Composers: Takeru Kanazaki; Hiroki Morishita; Rei Kondoh; Masato Kouda; Yasuhisa Baba
- Series: Fire Emblem
- Platform: Nintendo 3DS
- Release: June 25, 2015: Birthright/Conquest; JP: June 25, 2015; NA: February 19, 2016; EU: May 20, 2016; AU: May 21, 2016 Revelation; JP: July 9, 2015; NA: March 10, 2016; EU: June 9, 2016; AU: June 10, 2016
- Genre: Tactical role-playing
- Modes: Single-player, multiplayer

Fire Emblem Fates (Note: Known in Japan as Fire Emblem if (Japanese: ファイアーエムブレム if, Hepburn: Faiā Emuburemu Ifu)) is a tactical role-playing video game for the Nintendo 3DS handheld video game console, developed by Intelligent Systems and Nintendo SPD and published by Nintendo. It was released in June 2015 in Japan, then released internationally in 2016. It is the fourteenth installment in the Fire Emblem series (Note: Sources disagree on the exact numbering: it is variously called the twelfth, fourteenth including remakes, and fifteenth including all titles released at that point.) and the second to be developed for Nintendo 3DS after Fire Emblem Awakening. Unlike previous titles, Fates was released in three versions, each following a different storyline centered on the same characters: Birthright (Note: White Night Kingdom (Japanese: 白夜王国, Hepburn: Byakuya Ōkoku)) and Conquest (Note: Dark Night Kingdom (Japanese: 暗夜王国, Hepburn: Anya Ōkoku)) as physical releases, and Revelation (Note: Invisible Kingdom (Japanese: インビジブルキングダム, Hepburn: Inbijiburu Kingudamu)) as downloadable content.

The overarching story follows the protagonist, a customizable Avatar named Corrin by default, as they are unwillingly drawn into a war between the Kingdoms of Hoshido (their birthplace) and Nohr (their adopted home), and must choose which side to support. In Revelation, the Avatar rallies both sides against the true mastermind behind the war. The gameplay, which revolves around tactical movement of units across a grid-based battlefield, shares many mechanics with previous Fire Emblem games, although some elements are unique to each scenario.

After the critical and commercial success of Awakening, development began on Fates, with the staff of Awakening returning to their previous roles. The team's main concern was adding new features and refinements to the original gameplay, and improving the story, which had received criticism from some fans. To this end, writer Shin Kibayashi was brought in. To show all sides of the story and provide players with different Fire Emblem experiences, the game was split up into multiple versions. Upon release, it met with highly positive reviews: Birthright was generally seen as a good starting place for new players, Conquest was praised for its challenge, while Revelation was noted as a good middle ground between the two releases.

== Gameplay ==
In Fire Emblem Fates, the player begins by customizing the main character. Their gender, appearance, and name can be changed to the player's preference. At the game's beginning, there are three difficulties: Normal, Hard, and Lunatic. There are also modes that dictate the fate of characters in battle should they be defeated. In Classic Mode, a fallen unit is subject to permanent death, a recurring mode in the Fire Emblem series that removes fallen characters from the rest of the game. Casual Mode enables units to be revived at the end of a battle. The new Phoenix mode revives units on the following player turn. Each version of Fates is focused around a different gameplay style. The gameplay of Birthright is similar to the prior installment Fire Emblem Awakening and features opportunities to gain extra gold and experience. In contrast, Conquest rewards players limited experience and currency per completed map. Also included are additional objectives in battle such as defending a base or suppressing enemy forces, and some levels have a limited number of turns. Revelation uses a mixture of elements from Birthright and Conquest: while offering opportunities for gold and experience as with Birthright, it provides varied objectives and strategic elements similar to Conquest.

A new feature introduced to the series is "My Castle", in which the player is able to create a base for their army, where they can establish shops, buy weapons and items, and interact with allied characters. Shops can be leveled up, which allows the player to choose from a wider range of items to buy. Players can run a farm in their base, allowing them to make food. At the restaurant in the base, they can serve food, which will grant characters who eat it positive effects; however, some foods can also have negative effects. The player's personal quarters are also located here; the player can use them to interact with detailed models of other characters and the Avatar's spouse (if applicable). Players are able to visit other players' bases using the StreetPass functionality of the Nintendo 3DS. During a visit, they can fight the other player's army, buy items, and recruit characters. As different items are available in the two versions of the game, this allows players access to items that normally would be unavailable.

=== Battle system ===
Screenshot of a battle in Fire Emblem Fates, showing two characters about to fight one another. The basic mechanics of the battle system are all displayed.

Battles take place on a grid-based battlefield, with turns being given for players and enemies. During an attack, the view transitions from a top-down perspective to a third-person view. Environments and terrain vary between levels, ranging from mountainous regions to flatlands. A unique ability members of each kingdom's royal family have is the ability to use Dragon Veins, which are special map tiles that enable them to alter the environment in favor of their side. Like previous games in the series, Fire Emblem Fates features a "weapon triangle" – a system where certain weapons have advantages over others. However, in Fates the triangle differs from previous installments, with swords and magic defeating axes and bows, axes and bows besting lances and hidden weapons, and lances and hidden weapons overpowering swords and magic. Weapons in Fates do not have a limited-use durability system sans staves; instead, stronger weapons will lower some of the user's abilities. For instance, while the Brave Sword allows its user to attack twice, it also lowers their defense and magic defense stats.

Units are assigned a unique character class: in battle, each unit's usable weapon types and range of movement are pre-determined by their class. Each character begins the game with a starting class: the main protagonist begins as a Nohr Prince/Princess, while Azura begins as a Songstress. The classes of each version of Fates are also distinct from each other, drawing from their respective nation's aesthetics. Using special items known as "Seals", classes can be evolved or changed: effects of various Seals range from upgrading a character's class, changing class completely, raising their experience level, or altering their stats. Character relationships are developed during and between battle, also known as Support, which can be viewed in conversations via the Support menu outside of battle. Battling with an adjacent or paired-up unit gives advantages, such as blocking an attack or attacking alongside the currently controlled unit. Outside battle, relationships between characters can be fostered to the point of marriage and children. These children's appearance and abilities are determined by their parents. Using a particular Seal, child characters can also take on additional skills from parents. The game also introduces two other Seals for changing classes, the Partner and Friendship Seals, which allow the user to gain the class of their spouse or best friend respectively (provided the class is compatible and that an S or A+ Support rank is reached respectively).

The game features online multiplayer. Having five maps as standard, matches can be carried out with select players, random players, or through local multiplayer. Random battles are played either with standard rules, or with special limitations. The Fog of War environmental effect is removed, and turns have limits of five minutes. In addition, Fates features Amiibo support for the first time in the series, with four Fire Emblem characters from the Super Smash Bros. series appearing as recruitable units: Marth, Ike, Robin, and Lucina. When scanned, the character represented by the figurine will appear within My Castle, and after talking with them three times they can be fought in battle. When defeated, they become allies that join the main campaign. Talking with them prior to the fight gives the player themed items, such as Marth's tiara or Lucina's butterfly mask. Amiibo functionality is unlocked after the narrative splits and My Castle is unlocked.

== Synopsis ==
=== Setting and characters ===
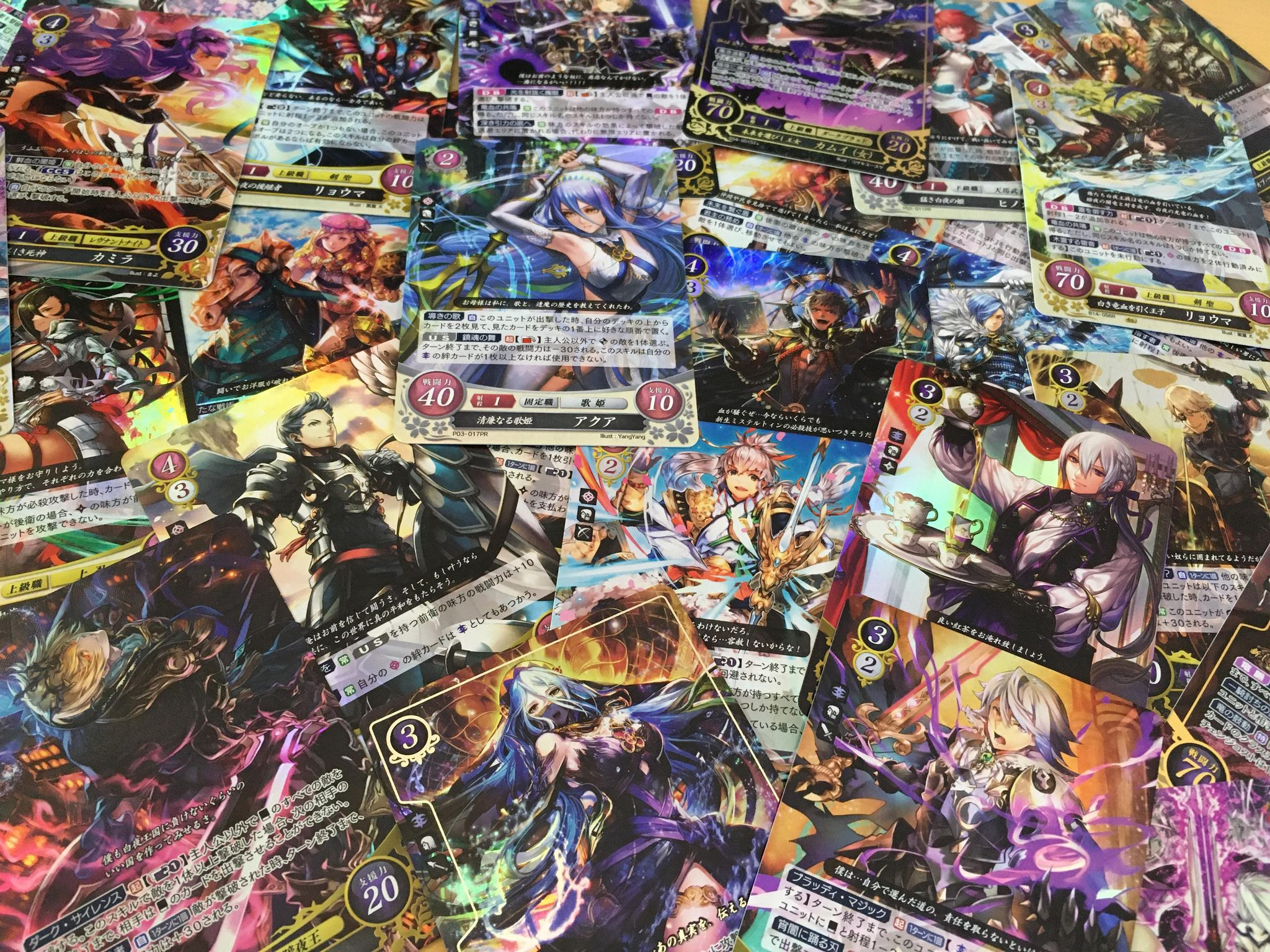
Pile of Fire Emblem Cipher cards, mostly depicting characters from Fire Emblem Fates

Fates is primarily set in the territories of the kingdoms of Hoshido and Nohr. Their royalty share a similar line of descent from ancient dragons, but each kingdom worships different dragon deities, and so exist in a state of war. Little do they know that there is also another dragon deity; the dragon Anankos, ruler of the kingdom of Valla. This realm is located under the Bottomless Canyon which separates Hoshido and Nohr. Anankos has usurped the throne of Valla and is intentionally provoking war between the two kingdoms. In the Hidden Truths DLC, it is revealed that Anankos was formerly a kind dragon who gave wisdom to humanity, but his growing power and inability to ascend to the spirit realm with the world's other dragons began corrupting him. After he killed Valla's king in an uncontrolled fit of bestial rage, he finally went mad: his remaining sanity and kindness took temporary shelter in a human form and fathered the Avatar before dying, while his dragon self began an insane crusade to destroy humanity.

The central character is the Avatar, named Corrin by default, whose name, gender, and appearance can be customized by the player. A member of the Hoshidan royal family, they were captured by Nohr at a young age. They have the unique ability of transforming into a dragon. The other central character is Azura, a member of the Nohrian royal family who was kidnapped by Hoshido as part of their efforts to rescue Corrin. Holding power over water, she is one of the companions to join Corrin in whichever story route they choose. She can pacify foes with the song Lost in Thought All Alone with her pendant. The main characters among the Hoshidan royal family include Corrin's siblings Ryoma, Takumi, Hinoka, and Sakura. Ryoma and Takumi wield the Legendary Weapons of Hoshido, the Raijinto katana and the Fujin Yumi. The main characters from the Nohrian kingdom include Corrin's guardian, Gunter, and their adoptive siblings Xander, Camilla, Leo, and Elise. Xander and Leo respectively wield the Legendary Weapons of Nohr: the sword Siegfried and the tome Brynhildr. Other characters include Corrin's mother, Queen Mikoto of Hoshido; King Garon of Nohr; Sumeragi, the former king of Hoshido and husband of Mikoto; and Anankos, the dragon ruler of Valla and Corrin's blood father.

=== Plot ===
Several years prior to the start of the game, Hoshido's King Sumeragi is ambushed by Nohr's King Garon during a fake peace treaty talk between the nations and is killed. King Garon kidnaps Sumeragi's young child, Corrin, and decides to raise them to serve his purposes. Meanwhile, back in Hoshido, without their king, Sumeragi's wife Mikoto becomes the new ruler of the kingdom. After coming of age, Corrin is sent by Garon to inspect a Hoshidan fortress above the Bottomless Canyon. However, one of Garon's men, Hans, provokes a battle with the Hoshidans and throws Corrin's mentor Gunter into the Canyon. Corrin is found and captured by Hoshidan soldiers, who recognize them as a long-lost member of the Hoshidan royal family. Corrin is brought to meet their blood relatives and Azura at the capital city. However, soldiers attack the city and a hooded assassin attempts to kill Corrin. Mikoto shields them at the cost of her life. In the aftermath, Corrin comes into possession of a legendary sword called Yato, said to belong to the one who will save the world. In the opening battle between the two kingdoms, Corrin's two families meet, and Corrin is forced to choose between siding with Hoshido and Nohr. In the Birthright and Conquest routes, Corrin chooses either their biological or adopted family, respectively. This causes them to be denounced by the other side, and they are gradually forced to fight them.

In the Birthright route, Corrin helps their Hoshidan kin defend their country from invasion by Nohr. After confrontations with Corrin, Camilla and Leo's lives are spared. With the help of Elise and Shura, the man who kidnapped Azura from Nohr, Corrin and their company invade the Nohrian capital. Elise is killed when she attempts to stop Corrin and Xander from fighting, and Xander falls into despair and forces Corrin to kill him. Corrin then faces Garon, killing him with the Yato after it is infused with added power from Ryoma and Takumi's Legendary Weapons. However, Azura dies after having overused her singing powers to weaken Garon. In the epilogue, Ryoma is crowned king of Hoshido and Leo is crowned king of Nohr, and peace is forged between the two kingdoms.

In the Conquest route, Corrin both fights in the war against Hoshido, and works with their adoptive family to change Nohr's brutal reputation from within. One night, Corrin finds Azura wandering alone and follows her, ultimately being transported into the invisible kingdom of Valla. There, Azura reveals that King Garon has been replaced by an impostor. Corrin then decides to have Garon sit upon the magical throne of Hoshido, which will remove the false Garon's disguise. During the invasion of Hoshido, the Nohrians spare Hinoka and capture Sakura, while Takumi, whose behavior has become increasingly erratic and violent throughout the war, apparently dies by jumping off of a rampart. Garon orders Corrin to kill Ryoma. After their fight, Ryoma spares Corrin the pain of killing their own brother by killing himself. Infusing the Yato with the power of Xander and Leo's Legendary Weapons, Corrin confronts and kills the false Garon. However, a crazed Takumi suddenly appears and attacks them, and it is revealed he has been long dead and his body is possessed. Corrin destroys Takumi's body to free his soul. Azura overuses her powers as in the Birthright route, but her death is not seen and she is instead marked as missing. In the epilogue, Hinoka is crowned queen of Hoshido and Xander is crowned king of Nohr, and a peaceful alliance between the two kingdoms is formed.

In the Revelation route, Corrin rejects both Hoshido and Nohr, and is denounced as a traitor by both. They flee with Azura through the Bottomless Canyon to the kingdom of Valla, where they find Gunter still alive. Azura reveals Anankos's manipulation of events, and that she is the daughter of Valla's last king; Anankos created a curse that kills any who reveal Valla's existence outside its borders. To defeat Anankos, the two travel through Hoshido and Nohr, gradually gaining the trust and allegiance of their hereditary and adopted families, before a natural event seals Valla from the outside world. They also learn that the Yato is the "Seal of Flames", which when combined with the other families' Legendary Weapons will become the Fire Emblem, capable of killing Anankos. The united force travels to Valla, facing an army formed from the undead including Mikoto, Azura's mother Arete, and Sumeragi, the latter revealed to be Mikoto's assassin. During their battle with Mikoto, Corrin learns that they and Azura are maternal cousins, making Corrin an heir to Valla's throne. The group is eventually betrayed by Gunter, who was possessed by Anankos since first coming to Valla, but Corrin succeeds in freeing Gunter from Anankos' control. Upon reaching Anankos, Corrin unlocks the Fire Emblem's power, and despite summoning and eating the imposter Garon to regain his strength, Anankos is killed. In the aftermath, Valla is reestablished on the surface, Azura crowns Corrin its new ruler, and an everlasting peace is established between the three kingdoms.

The downloadable content scenario Heirs of Fate focuses on the children of the main characters, drawn from various realities into an isolated version of Valla by Anankos's power. Two separate versions of the Avatar's child Kana, one male and one female, journey with members of each version's cast to discover why a group of mysterious soldiers attacked their homes. It is revealed that they were never truly in their homes, as Anankos had transported them to Valla and attempted to trick them into killing each other. However, Azura's son, Shigure, breaks the illusion and bands the two Kanas' armies together, only to leave them to face Anankos alone with the hidden verse of his mother's song. However, the army finds a way back with help from Azura's spirit, and helps to defeat Anankos one final time across all worlds by giving their memories as an alternate sacrifice.

== Development ==
The previous title in the series, Fire Emblem Awakening, was planned to be the last in the series due to decreasing sales. The game was a worldwide commercial success, prompting Nintendo to greenlight a new entry. Fates was co-developed by regular Fire Emblem developer Intelligent Systems and Nintendo SPD, with the main staff of Awakening returning to their respective roles for Fates: they were Intelligent Systems's Kouhei Maeda as director, Nintendo SPD director Genki Yokota, Nintendo producer Hitoshi Yamagami, art director Toshiyuki Kusakihara, and character designer Yūsuke Kozaki. Yokota's work on the game ran parallel with his work on Xenoblade Chronicles X. Masahiro Higuchi, Awakening's project manager, came on board as a producer. According to the original staff, the request for a sequel was a shock as they had all developed Awakening assuming it would be the last in the series. During its early design stages, Fates was given the working title "Fire Emblem 3DS II". The game's cutscenes were animated by Studio Anima, returning from Awakening, while storyboarding was handled by Spooky Graphic. To develop the multiple versions, one core team worked on the game's shared assets, while additional teams handled individual level design.

The gameplay was refined and expanded from the version they used in Awakening. The "My Castle" feature was suggested by Maeda as an alternative activity for players, and to provide a means for getting to know the main characters outside battle. The amount of content included in the feature made some staff comment that it could be its own game. The social elements of My Castle were originally going to be exclusive to StreetPass, but it was suggested that players in areas with low StreetPass activity should be able to access the functions through a normal Internet connection. Some ideas thought up by Maeda for earlier titles, such as the Dragon Vein ability and the way skills were inherited by second generation characters, were also implemented. Due to the necessity for multiple versions, map designing became a larger task than anticipated, with very few maps being shared between versions. The Phoenix Mode was included to bring new fans into the series, a philosophy that they had neglected up until Awakening and improved for Fates. For the first time in the Fire Emblem series, the option for the main character to marry a character of the same sex was included: the potential male and female partners, Niles and Rhajat, respectively appear in Conquest and Birthright, and both appear in Revelation. According to Nintendo, this move was done to reflect the diversity of their player base.

The two kingdoms were based upon different cultures: Hoshido was themed after Japan, while Nohr used a Medieval European setting similar to earlier Fire Emblem games. The kingdoms of Hoshido and Nohr were designed to contrast each other in a variety of ways, with the most obvious being its architecture: Hoshido was themed around light and air, while Nohr was themed around darkness and stone. When development first started, the team unanimously decided to ask Kozaki to return as character designer, as he had been for Awakening. The sheer number of characters this approach entailed made the staff worry about whether Kozaki would be willing to return. The Hoshido characters' clothing were influenced by Japanese culture and character designs drew inspiration from well-known people in Japan: a main instance was Ryoma, whose clothing was based on samurai, including historical figures such as Takeda Shingen, along with incorporating animal motifs such as lions. The colors used in their clothing were varied and mainly bright to emphasize the country's focus on light. For Nohr, a "vampire-like taste" equivalent to dark fantasy was used to highlight it as a kingdom where the sun did not shine. Kozaki used black and purple as key colors in character designs to create a cold and unified image. The nobility of Nohr were given similar design elements to represent their familial connections. The first character Kozaki designed was the Avatar. Kozaki did not put much thought into their general appearance, but took care about their clothing so that it was not overtly styled after either Hoshido or Nohr, keeping the neutrality of the player up to the main story decision point. They were given bare feet due to the animalistic impression Kozaki had after hearing of their strong ties to dragons, along with creating a "hook" for players equivalent to other characters in the game. The main key artwork, showing the two families together, was described by Kozaki as "a pain to draw" due to their clashing designs, and was the point of much discussion by staff before it was finalized. Azura was not included in artwork for the two physical editions, but she was more prominently presented in artwork surrounding Revelation as she played a much larger role in the story.

=== Scenario ===
During the initial planning stage, the team reviewed how fans and critics had responded to Awakening. While the gameplay and graphics were positively received, the story had been criticized for being too simple by some long-time fans, even though new players approved of it. To that end, they decided to write a story that would appeal to series veterans as well as newcomers. The concept of the story changing depending on which protagonists the main character sided with, originated from Yamagami's memories of the first Fire Emblem game, which allowed for choosing different protagonists but did not change the story. Wanting to play from both sides of a conflict and show both sides as neither good nor evil, the team decided to create multiple versions of the game. Initially, the plan was just for a choice between one of the two kingdoms, but Yamagami wanted a third neutral path where neither side was chosen, so a third version of the game was planned. The game's Japanese subtitle, "if", came from the sheer number of choices featured for players in the game. The English title "Fates" referred to the concept of the main character shaping and changing their fate by choosing a side. After the creation of the three storylines, the team needed to make the decision to divide Birthright and Conquest into separate physical releases. This was because packaging them as a single release would have necessitated raising the game's price to the equivalent of a two-game bundle, which would not benefit people who wanted to play one single version. Another reason for this decision was how easy it had become to add the other versions on as cheaper downloadable content (DLC). This opened up the option for players to run through the game until the crucial decision point in Chapter 6, then buy the alternate routes as downloadable content so they had different choices. Each route was estimated to have the same amount of gameplay and story content as Awakening.

As the plans for three different versions of the game appeared, the staff realized that it was impossible to write three storylines in-house. After searching through known video game writers, they decided to consider writers in other fields. The writer suggested by Maeda was Shin Kibayashi, who was famous in Japan for his work on multiple manga and television series. Kibayashi was initially approached by Kozaki through their shared editor, and was pitched the project by the staff in December 2012. Kibayashi was going to refuse the project as he had a tight work schedule, but after both he and his daughter played through a copy of Awakening provided by staff, Kibayashi decided to accept and wrote an initial draft story. Despite his initial minimal commitment of a ten-page summary for each storyline, he became fond of the characters and felt that 10 pages were not enough, and thus the full summary for Birthright extended to about 500 pages. After delivering his work, he then wrote summaries of equal length for Conquest and Revelation, driven by the need to create a high-quality story, partially to surpass his daughter's pressuring expectations, and ended up writing enough script to fill two books. While the Japanese titles for Birthright and Conquest were written in kanji, the third storyline's title was written in katakana to distinguish it from the other two. A great deal of the character traits for the royals of Hoshido and Nohr were contributed by Kibayashi. After he had done his work on the storylines, other writers took over much of the rest of the work. The main scenario writer for the Revelation storyline was Yukinori Kitajima, a writer associated with the Senran Kagura series. He and other staff from his scriptwriting company Synthese also wrote the support conversations for Birthright and Conquest. One of the principal writers for all three story routes was Nami Komuro, who had previously worked on Awakening.

=== Music ===
The game's soundtrack was created by multiple composers. Intelligent Systems's Hiroki Morishita and T's Music's Rei Kondoh previously worked on Awakening, while WarioWare composers Takeru Kanazaki and Yasuhisa Baba of Intelligent Systems, and Monster Hunter composer Masato Kouda of Design Wave joined the team as newcomers. Longtime series composer Yuka Tsujiyoko acted as a supervisor. Morishita and Kanazaki wrote the majority of the game's tracks. Arrangements were handled by Morishita, Kanazaki, Kondoh and Kouda. Many of Tsujiyoko's tracks for earlier Fire Emblem titles were remixed for use in Fates.

The game's theme song, "Lost in Thoughts All Alone", (Note: If~Hitori Omou (Japanese: if～ひとり思う; lit. "If~ One's Thoughts")) was written by Morishita, with lyrics by Maeda, and sung by Japanese pop singer Renka, who also provided Azura's in-game singing voice. The developers were looking for a singer who could do justice to their vision for the character, and when they heard Renka's audition, they instantly decided that she was right for the role. According to music personnel, several among them cried when they first heard her performance. Multiple versions were used throughout the soundtrack. Azura's normal voice work is performed by Japanese voice actress Lynn. In the English version, Azura's speaking and singing voice were provided by Rena Strober. The lyrics were adapted into English by Audrey Drake.

An official soundtrack album, Fire Emblem if Official Soundtrack, released on April 27, 2016, through the Symphony No. 5 label of Tablier Communications. The album contains seven discs of music from all three versions of Fates, and a booklet featuring commentary from the composers. Also included is a special DVD containing remixes of tracks from both Fates and previous Fire Emblem games, high-definition versions of the three opening cinematics, and cutscenes from Birthright and Conquest featuring alternate versions of a dance sequence with Azura. The soundtrack, having eight disks in total, is one of the largest single game official soundtracks ever released. "Lost in Thoughts All Alone", Renka's debut single, was released as a regular CD edition and a special DVD edition featuring a music video on July 1, 2015. It was also included as part of the main soundtrack release.

== Release ==
Fates was announced for all regions via a Nintendo Direct broadcast in January 2015. It was announced in Japan as Fire Emblem if. Its English title was revealed during the Electronic Entertainment Expo 2015. Fates was released in multiple versions. Birthright and Conquest both received a physical release on June 25, 2015, in Japan, which was announced for a 2016 release in the West. Players who purchase a physical copy of either version can download the other version as DLC for a reduced price. Revelation was released exclusively as downloadable content on July 9, two weeks after the physical release of Fates. In addition to the standard releases was a special edition giving access to Birthright, Conquest, and Revelation. The western release also follows the release pattern used in Japan. In North America, the physical versions were released first in February, with the third storyline coming later as DLC in March. In Europe, the physical editions were released on May 20, with Revelation following as DLC on June 9. A special edition, containing all three storylines and an art book, was made available in both regions alongside the initial physical releases. In Australia, the physical versions launched on May 21, while Revelation launched on June 10. On July 19, 2022, it was announced that sales of Fates would cease on February 28, 2023, ahead of the Nintendo eShop's closure on March 27, 2023.

The Japanese release was promoted by a Fire Emblem themed trading card game and an Awakening themed manga. Two "starter packs" for the trading cards come with codes that allow players access to the characters Marth and Lucina in the game in the form of DLC. Similarly, the "booster box" will come with a code for the character Minerva. A special New Nintendo 3DS changeable cover based on Fates was released in Japan alongside the game's physical release. After release, a manga based on the game was announced, beginning serialization in the September issue of Monthly Young Magazine. It is written by Kibayashi and illustrated by Kozaki. After release, multiple DLC maps were released between July and September 2015: these ranged from story-related maps to optional maps featuring characters from other Fire Emblem games. This DLC was released between February and April 2016 in North America. In Europe, the DLC launched between mid-May and late July.

The game's localization was done by Nintendo's localization branch, Nintendo Treehouse. According to one of the English voice actors, Nintendo was secretive of information relating to Fates, causing the voice actors to know almost nothing about the game. Due to the removal of gay relationships in the western version of the game Tomodachi Life, fans worried that the gay relationships in Fates would also be removed. Nintendo ultimately retained the option in the localized game. The game underwent alterations for its western release. It features a female character named Soleil who is attracted to women; in the Japanese version, a support conversation between the male avatar and Soleil was criticized for elements some deemed similar to gay conversion therapy. In the western release, these elements were removed from the characters' support conversations to avoid causing controversy. The personality and manner of speech of some characters was changed in the English localization as well, such as one character being made less serious, while another was changed from a "kindhearted gentle giant" to being a "macho narcissist". Another character, Kana, was made to "speak dragon" with "gibberish" at times, and was also made more childish. An in-depth conversation between two characters about their background was removed, replaced with ellipses from both characters. Dialogue was also modified to add references to The Simpsons, Sonic the Hedgehog, and Urban Dictionary terminology.

Elements of a minigame exclusive to the My Castle area, involving "petting" a chosen character's face on the touch screen to build up affection, was also removed from the western versions. While the 2D interactions and the support increases were present, the stylus-based touch screen element was removed. An unrelated minigame in which Corrin could wake up their spouse remained unmodified. The option for Japanese voiceovers, present in Awakening, was also removed from Fates. According to an official statement by Nintendo, other unspecified changes were also made where it was deemed necessary. These changes, among others pointed out through comparisons by fans between the English and Japanese versions, generated controversy over the Internet in the wake of the game's release, culminating in complaints being sent directly to Nintendo. It also prompted a group dubbed "Team If" to start work on a more faithful fan translation, though it was ultimately cancelled shortly after the game's official release.

== Reception ==
Reception

Aggregate scores
Aggregator	Score
Metacritic	86/100 (Birthright); 87/100 (Conquest); 88/100 (Revelation); 88/100 (All versions)
OpenCritic	87% recommend (Birthright); 93% recommend (Conquest); 88% recommend (Revelation)

Review scores
Publication	Score
Destructoid	8.5/10 (Birthright); 9.5/10 (Conquest); 9/10 (Revelation)
Electronic Gaming Monthly	8/10
Eurogamer	Recommended
Famitsu	36/40 (Birthright/Conquest)
Game Informer	9.25/10 (Birthright/Conquest); 8/10 (Revelation)
GameSpot	8/10 (Birthright); 7/10 (Conquest); 9/10 (Revelation)
GamesRadar+	4/5
IGN	9.4/10 (Birthright); 9.5/10 (Conquest/Revelation)
Nintendo World Report	9.5/10
Polygon	8.5/10

The different versions of Fates received high scores on aggregate site Metacritic. Birthright scored 86/100 based on thirty-five critic reviews. Conquest received a slightly higher score of 87/100, based on forty reviews. Revelation scored 88/100 based on twenty-five reviews. Reviews for all versions of Fates generated a score of 88/100 based on thirty-six reviews. Famitsu, which reviewed both physical versions in tandem, praised them for their drama and characters, despite noting that the inter-character relations of the two versions were complicated, and only playing one side of the story might leave players unsatisfied. They praised the various battle functions, relationship mechanics and easy-to-use interface. The "My Castle" feature, while starting out as feeling incomplete, was a satisfying experience. Martin Robinson of Eurogamer praised the game as a sound continuation of the mechanical improvements of Awakening: he positively noted the grey morality of the characters and story, and singled out Conquest as the "cooler" of the two physical versions due to its challenge and cast. His main criticism was its multi-part release, which he called "needlessly convoluted" and stated might alienate fans attracted to the series by Awakening. He also faulted Nintendo's translation work as less "characterful" than the localization of Awakening by 8-4, along with the "clumsy" removal of the Japanese original's petting mechanic. Mic writer Kevin O'Keeffe praised the inclusion of same-sex relations, stating that he was pleasantly surprised to find that the relationships were explicitly romantic and as legitimate as the heterosexual relationships. Despite his praise, he criticized the lack of relationship options, as well as the loss of two playable characters in the form of the two's potential offspring if Corrin and Niles each married a woman. He appreciated the inclusion for the sake of representation, arguing that such inclusions make LGBT people feel more comfortable with themselves. TechRadar writer V.S. Wells was critical of how it depicted Niles and Rhajat, believing they fit into the "depraved bisexual" stereotype and that their bisexuality was used to "highlight their moral ambiguity". They cited Rhajat stalking Corrin even if Corrin is married, as well as Niles threatening torture "for fun" while flirting with other characters. Melanie Zawodniak of Nintendo World Report was mixed on Corrin; while she commended the developers for making an avatar character the protagonist as she felt it added "personal stakes" to the player's relationship with both their allies and enemies, she found Corrin to be poorly written and a "disaster of a character".

Chris Carter of Destructoid called Birthright's story "relatively open and shut" despite keeping complex character relationships intact, while generally citing it as the best starting place for series newcomers. Javy Gwaltney of Game Informer called the story of Birthright "a surprisingly dark tale", praised the improvements made to the gameplay over Awakening, and was overall positive despite some criticism of its poor tutorial systems. He also liked the game's music and graphics, although he critiqued the latter a little due to low-res battle models. Meghan Sullivan of IGN called the story, music and visuals "great", and greatly enjoyed the gameplay systems despite mission repetition and a slow online interface. Alexa Ray Corriea of GameSpot greatly enjoyed the changes to gameplay and its strategy despite little variation in playable maps, and enjoyed the character interactions while noting that the dialogue became overly melodramatic in places. Kimberley Keller of Nintendo World Report, reviewing all versions of the game, generally praised the game as a whole while calling Birthright the "perfect way to start [Fates]" due to its traditional Fire Emblem elements. Griffin McElroy and Allegra Frank of Polygon, reviewing all versions of the game, were generally positive about the gameplay and the interplay between versions, while criticizing the overly complicated character class system. They referred to Birthright as a "straightforward march for vengeance, where victory almost always entails defeating an entire platoon or its leader". Both Connor Sheridan of GamesRadar and Ray Carsillo of Electronic Gaming Monthly shared many points of praise with other reviewers about the general gameplay: Sheriden called Birthright a familiar experience when compared to the other titles, while Carsillo recommended it as a good starting point.

Carter found Conquest a much tougher experience from a gameplay perspective, being geared towards dedicated tactical battles within pre-set limits, while finding its story more intriguing than that of Birthright. Gwaltney called Conquest a "dark fantasy epic" that asked difficult moral questions, and generally cited the gameplay as harder and consequently more rewarding than that of its counterparts despite sharing tutorial deficiencies with Birthright. He also shared his opinions on the music and graphics with Birthright. Jose Otero, writing for IGN, frequently noted the game's challenge, while generally sharing his praises with Sullivan's review of Birthright, including slow online elements. A point of praise not shared with Birthright was its mission variety. Peter Brown, reviewing the game for GameSpot, praised the gameplay variety and the characters' development and meaningful use in battle, while critiquing the plot for being "fairly middle of the road" and did not like the lack of optional side missions. Keller noted the harder gameplay structure of Conquest, while noting that its story had a far more comedic tone with its characters. In particular, Patricia Hernandez of Kotaku felt that Camilla, a playable character in Conquest, had a personality and appearance that were "sexualized", while Gita Jackson of the same publication described her clothes as making her resemble a dominatrix, saying that "every time you think it's going to do something sensible, it defies expectations". McElroy and Frank referred to Conquest as the more challenging of the two physical releases, an opinion shared by Carsillo and Sheridan: the latter added that the game would not make players feel like a hero. Robinson called Conquest the "cooler" of the two physical releases, noting its steeper challenge and more engaging cast.

Carter considered Revelation to be a good middle ground between Birthright and Conquest, and praised its story after moving beyond the conceit of its premise. Corriae was highly positive about the game: while finding the initial premise rather contrived, she greatly enjoyed the resultant drama and found the story better than that of Birthright and Conquest. She also praised the game for its gameplay and variety. Keller said the story of Revelation "keeps players on their toes", while praised the gameplay for finding a middle ground between the two physical releases. She called it "a fulfilling conclusion" to Fates. While generally positive about the game as a whole, Sheridan was rather critical of the fact that players needed to buy Revelation as DLC to get the whole story. Gwaltney was less favorable than he was about Birthright and Conquest: while he enjoyed the early tension of a limited party, the ability to expand and strengthen the party sapped away the tension, while he found the story "rather ho-hum and generic" after the more impactful stories of the first two versions. Sullivan of IGN greatly enjoyed the combination of characters and gameplay from Birthright and Conquest, but shared her opinion of the central plot device with Corriae. Carsillo found Revelation the most satisfying due to the obscuring of key plot points in the other versions despite Birthright and Conquest offering greater character insight, along with positively noting its gameplay balance between the two physical releases.

During the 20th Annual D.I.C.E. Awards, the Academy of Interactive Arts & Sciences nominated Fire Emblem Fates for "Handheld Game of the Year" and "Strategy/Simulation Game of the Year".

=== Sales ===
Shortly after pre-orders for the special edition were announced, it sold out within a day. Following complaints from fans, Nintendo created a second run for the edition. In its week of release, Fates topped sales charts, with initial sales of both versions totaling 260,675 copies. The game's special edition sold a further 42,991 copies, bringing total sales to 303,666 copies. Birthright was the better-selling of the physical versions, with Conquest coming in second place. It remained at the top of the charts the following week, selling a further 54,896 copies. Birthright remained at the top, while Conquest dropped to fourth place. By the third week, both versions of Fates had dropped to fourth place, selling a further 29,682 copies and bringing total sales to 345,253 copies. Famitsu's sales estimates were slightly higher, with their sales figures for the game totaling 353,201 copies, and going on to sell 71,550 and 41,400 copies over the next two weeks, bringing total recorded sales to 456,274 copies. In July, Kibayashi reported via Twitter that Fates was the current best-selling video game on Amazon Japan. By the end of 2015, according to Famitsu, both physical versions had sold a combined total of 538,669 units, coming in at No. 10 of the year's top-selling video games.

Prior to its western release, pre-orders for the Special Edition holding all three versions were high, resulting in it selling out by December 2015. After this, a glitch in GameStop's ordering system meant that copies of the Special Edition were reserved after stocks were empty, and they gave orders the option of cancelling or transferring their order to a different Special Edition offer. On release in North America, the game became the fastest-selling game in the series' history, selling over 300,000 units during its opening weekend: this was estimated as being five times the debut sales of Awakening during a similar period. Birthright was the better-selling of the two versions, with Conquest said to be "close behind". According to the February NPD Group report, Fates sold nearly 400,000 copies across physical and digital versions, with both versions reaching places in the top ten gaming chart. In addition, combined sales of all versions including the Special Edition placed the game third overall in software sales, tripling the equivalent first-month sales of Awakening. When the physical versions released in the UK, Birthright was the better-selling edition, coming in at No. 5 in the all-format charts behind multi-platform releases Doom, Homefront: The Revolution and Uncharted 4: A Thief's End. Conquest came in at No. 11 in the all-format charts. In platform-specific charts, Birthright and Conquest reached No. 6 and No. 8 respectively. In Nintendo's financial briefing at the end of the 2015–2016 fiscal year, the game was said to have sold 1.84 million copies, with 780,000 copies sold in Japan and 1.06 million copies elsewhere. The title's DLC sales were also strong, coming in fifth in the top-five best-selling DLC content for Nintendo products in Fiscal 2015–2016. Nintendo announced different sales in 2017, the game had sold-through 1.6 million copies worldwide, with 500,000 copies sold in Japan and 1.1 million copies elsewhere by the end of March 2017, lower than previously announced. Fire Emblem Fates has sold 3 million times as of December 2019.

== Legacy ==
A few weeks prior to the North American release of Fire Emblem Fates, Corrin appeared as a playable character in the 2014 crossover fighting games Super Smash Bros. for Nintendo 3DS and Wii U, being released as downloadable content on February 3, 2016. Both male and female versions of Corrin are present as alternate costumes for the fighter, whose attacks are based on their ability to transform into a dragon. The Corrin DLC also includes two additional music tracks from Fates, as well as two bonus trophies for the Nintendo 3DS version. Corrin returns as a playable fighter in the next entry, Super Smash Bros. Ultimate, now as part of the base roster. Characters from Fates were added to the crossover mobile game Fire Emblem Heroes and the Dynasty Warriors-inspired hack and slash game Fire Emblem Warriors beginning at launch, with more being added post-launch. Amiibo figures of Corrin were released on July 21, 2017, in both male and female variants. The Amiibo can be scanned into Fire Emblem Echoes: Shadows of Valentia to summon an apparition of Corrin as a temporary ally in battle. Additionally, they can be scanned into Fire Emblem: Three Houses to unlock music tracks from Fates in optional battles.
