= Fire Emblem Warriors =

2017 video game

- Icon artwork featuring several characters from the game
- Developers: Omega Force; Team Ninja
- Publishers: JP: Koei Tecmo; WW: Nintendo
- Director: Hiroya Usuda
- Producer: Yosuke Hayashi
- Designer: Makoto Ishizuka
- Artist: Yuta Matsunaga
- Writers: Yuki Ikeno; Ryohei Hayashi; Mari Okamoto; Masahiro Kato
- Composer: Yosuke Kinoshita
- Series: Fire Emblem; Dynasty Warriors
- Platforms: New Nintendo 3DS; Nintendo Switch
- Release: JP: September 28, 2017; WW: October 20, 2017
- Genres: Hack and slash, action role-playing
- Modes: Single-player, multiplayer

Fire Emblem Warriors (Note: Japanese: ファイアーエムブレム無双, Hepburn: Faiā Emuburemu Musou) is a 2017 hack and slash action role-playing game co-developed by Omega Force and Team Ninja, and published by Koei Tecmo in Japan and Nintendo internationally for the Nintendo Switch and New Nintendo 3DS. The game is a crossover between Koei Tecmo's Dynasty Warriors franchise, and the Fire Emblem series developed by Intelligent Systems. The story follows the quest of Aytolis's twin royal heirs to defend their realm when the king of neighbouring Gristonne starts summoning an evil dragon, with the gameplay combining the arena-based action combat in Dynasty Warriors with relationship and weapon systems from Fire Emblem. The game was supported with downloadable content adding additional playable characters during 2017 and 2018.

Production began in 2015 during work on an expanded version of Hyrule Warriors (2014). Director Hiroya Usuda and producer Yosuke Hayashi returned from Hyrule Warriors, working with Intelligent Systems staff to create a Warriors-style title that would honor and incorporate distinctive Fire Emblem elements. On release, Fire Emblem Warriors was praised by journalists for the blending of Warriors and Fire Emblem elements. Criticism focused on its story, limited character roster, and the Switch version's technical performance. The game ultimately sold over one million copies worldwide. Koei Tecmo would collaborate on the Fire Emblem series twice more; first as a co-developer on the mainline entry Fire Emblem: Three Houses (2019), then on the Warriors-style title Fire Emblem Warriors: Three Hopes (2022).

== Gameplay ==
A battle in Fire Emblem Warriors; a mounted Pegasus Knight fights footsoldiers

Fire Emblem Warriors is a hack and slash action role-playing game in which players take control of different characters from across the Fire Emblem series, along with two original lead characters, and engage in battles across large arena-type areas. Gameplay is split between "Story Mode", the main campaign which has pre-set playable characters; "Free Mode", which allows the player to complete missions with any character; "Arena Mode", where waves of enemies can be fought for rewards; and "History Mode" which unlocks new items and abilities for characters by completing challenges. The game also has two difficulty modes, "Casual" and "Classic"; in Classic mode, fallen units must be revived using gold and special items rather than reviving automatically.

General combat and mission structure is carried over from the Dynasty Warriors series. Controlling up to four characters as army commanders, the player must complete objectives within levels such as defeating groups of enemies, killing powerful boss characters, and capturing or holding control points in the levels. When not controlled by the player, other characters are controlled by the game's artificial intelligence, and the player can issue commands to their associated army units to help with tasks. During missions, the player is given tasks to complete upon reaching certain goals or map positions, which can have either visible or hidden timers for completion, and some zones require navigation through hostile terrain elements such as poisonous fog. Combat is based around combining light and heavy attacks, along with a metre-based special attack that can kill a large number of enemies. During missions, the player can fulfil conditions which summons a shop which provides character upgrades. In addition to the single-player mode, the Nintendo Switch version has a local cooperative multiplayer mode, allowing another player to join in missions.

The Weapon Triangle, carried over from Fire Emblem, makes certain weapons stronger or weaker against others; axes are strong against lances, lances are strong against swords, and swords are strong against axes; characters are unable to change their weapon type in-game. Player characters have an assigned character class which further influences their strengths and abilities. Characters can also activate "Awakening Mode, which grants increased damage while negating the Weapon Triangle, and can be sustained by killing enemy units. Characters grow in power both through leveling up, strengthening weapons, creating badges which enhance combat abilities, and changing their class through the use of a Master Seal item. Between missions, characters can also engage in Bond events, which raises their affinity and unlocks the ability to partner with a playable character and trigger special actions such as powerful attacks during combat.

== Synopsis ==
=== Setting and characters ===
Fire Emblem Warriors is set in a medieval fantasy world, and focuses on the neighbouring kingdoms of Aytolis and Gristonne. The story's events are set off when a dark force uses a magical gate connecting to other worlds to summon monsters into Aytolis. The series recurring "Fire Emblem" is featured as a powerful artifact dubbed the Shield of Flames, which is tied to the game's story.

The main characters are Rowan and Lianna, twin heirs to the throne of Aytolis gifted the Shield of Flames by their mother Queen Yelena. An important secondary character is Darios, crown prince of Gristonne and a childhood friend of the twins. A number of characters appear from other Fire Emblem titles, primarily from New Mystery of the Emblem (2010), Awakening (2012) and Fates (2015). Additional characters are taken from Gaiden (1992), and The Blazing Blade (2003). Anna, a recurring merchant character across the series, also appears.

=== Plot ===
When Rowan and Lianna are sparring with the visiting Darios one day, Aytolis is attacked by monsters summoned from the portal within the castle. Yelena is captured during the assault, but she successfully gives the twins the Shield of Flames, a sacred artifact which can repel darkness due to its blessing by a Divine Dragon. The group learn that Darios's father Oskar is in the process of reviving the Chaos Dragon Velezark, and to stop it the Shield of Flames must be empowered with Gleamstones, crystals created from the power of heroes from other realms. Rowan and Lianna travel across Aytolis, rallying support from the heroes of other worlds that have been brought to Aytolis.

During an attack on a Gristonne fortress, Velezark successfully possesses Darios, who steals the Shield of Flames just after it is complete. Rowan and Lianna pursue him to Gristonne, where they discover Yelena has been captured to be used as a sacrifice to revive Velezark. Rowan and Lianna successfully rescue their mother, leading to Darios sacrificing Oskar to complete the ritual to revive Velezark. Now freed from the possession, Darios returns the Shield of Flames to the group before falling into a spatial void. (Note: According to an interview, Darios's fate is left deliberately ambiguous.) The twins, united with the heroes of other worlds, wield the Shield of Flames' power and defeat Velezark. With the threat ended, the heroes return to their own worlds and Yelena crowns Rowan and Lianna as twin monarchs of Aytolis.

== Development ==
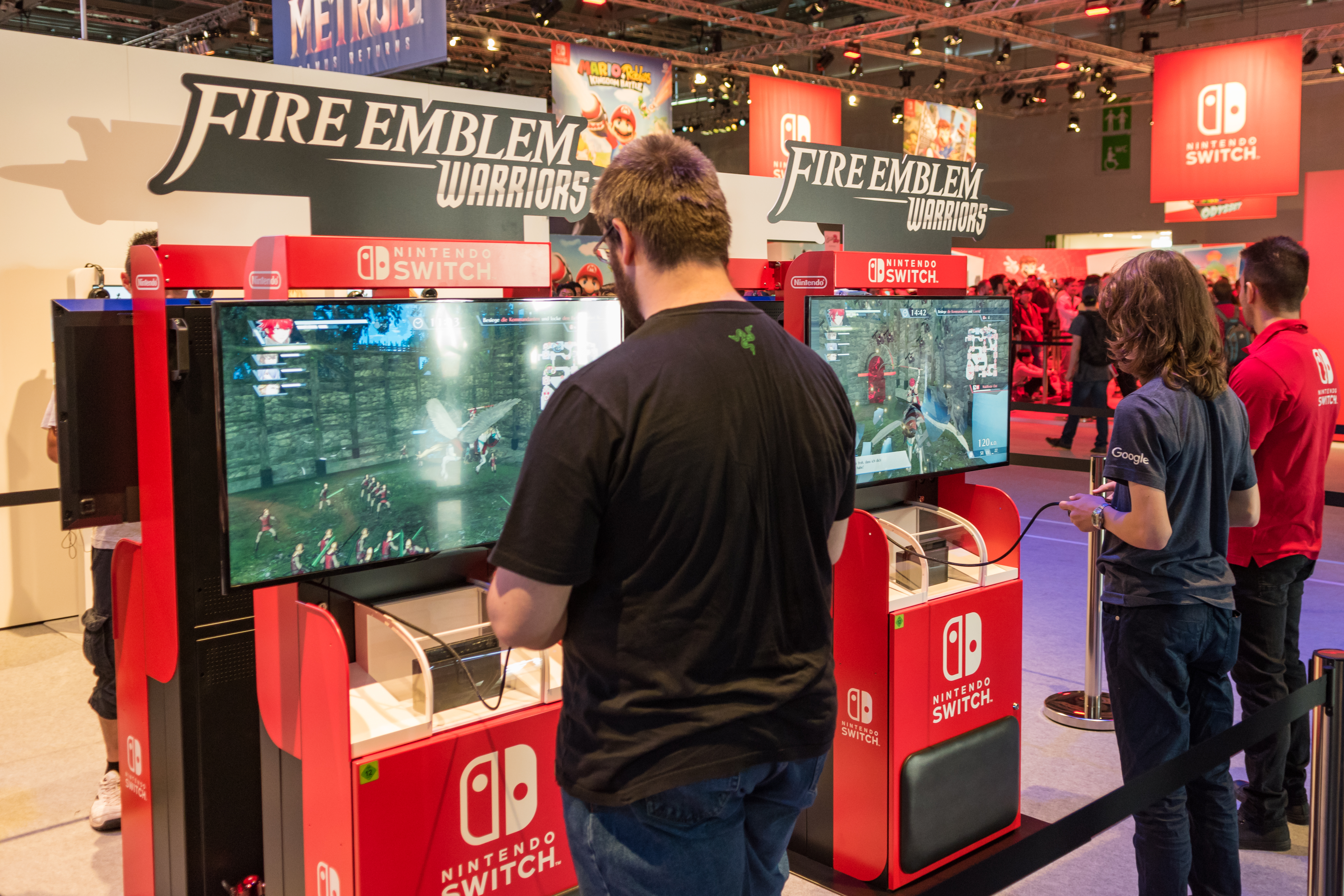
Demo booths of Fire Emblem Warriors at Gamescom 2017

Following the release of Hyrule Warriors (2014) for the Wii U, fan demands increased for a Warriors interpretation of the Fire Emblem series. While working on the expanded release Hyrule Warriors Legends, its producer Yosuke Hayashi wanted to work on this project, feeling the combat mechanics of the series would be a good fit with a Warriors title. Once work was completed on Hyrule Warriors Legends, Hayashi submitted his proposal to Nintendo and Fire Emblem developer Intelligent Systems on a Fire Emblem-based title, who both accepted. He then talked to director Hiroya Usuda, who was also eager to work on the project. Production was handled by established Dynasty Warriors developers Omega Force and Team Ninja studios, interior teams within Koei Tecmo. While the core team members of Hyrule Warriors were carried over, most of the team were chosen by Hayashi based on a request sent through the company for staff who were fans of Fire Emblem. Intelligent Systems acted as project supervisor for included characters.

Nintendo was in the middle of production for the Switch, and at their invitation the team made Fire Emblem Warriors a multiplatform title for both Switch and New Nintendo 3DS. There were initially concerns by the development team about the difficulty of making the game for the then-upcoming Switch, though Usuda later described it as "a very easy hardware to develop for." For early testing of level areas, the team used the model of Legend of Zelda protagonist Link to run around them. When choosing gameplay features, the team went through the best-known features of both Fire Emblem and Warriors, choosing features that would best fit together. Some features, such as the Weapons Triangle, were difficult to implement and needed adjustment for the action-based combat so players could both be strategic and enjoy the action combat. Notable inclusions from Fire Emblem were character permadeath, and a "casual" mode which disabled the former feature; the team included both to cater for both casual players and chose seeking a mechanical challenge. To rebalance the gameplay, some characters' weapons were changed such as Lissa from Awakening using an axe in combat rather than a cane, which was featured as a generic healing instrument. Drawing on their experience designing the horse Epona for Hyrule Warriors, the team designed the horse-mounted characters to have dedicated combat and abilities. The strategic elements were in part taken from a tactics management system included in Samurai Warriors: Chronicles and later Hyrule Warriors Legends; the system had partially inspired the team's wish to create a Fire Emblem crossover.

The game's scenario was co-written by Koei Tecmo's Yuki Ikeno, Ryohei Hayashi, Mari Okamoto and Masahiro Kato. The main plot of gathering gems for the Shield of Flames was directly inspired by the game's theme of different Fire Emblem characters being drawn together, following series conventions as they had done with Hyrule Warriors. Some story scenes were decided so they would lead into homages to other Fire Emblem titles. An early decision was to use young twin protagonists who would strengthen with the help of established characters, with their appearance and dialogue described as an important factor to make the game stand out. Yelena and Darios were incorporated to add a backstory to the twins' narrative, as Usuda and Hayashi felt the twins alone would seem shallow. The character writing was overseen by Intelligent Systems, ensuring that characters would talk to each other convincingly, and that those with intimate relationships would have different ways of speaking appropriate for their partner.

When choosing Fire Emblem characters to feature in the story, the team decided to limit their picks to New Mystery of the Emblem, Awakening and Fates. This narrowed approach was so the team could get a balance of characters with multiple weapons, as choosing only series leads would result in a large number of sword users and unbalance the planned gameplay systems. Character selection was also dictated by which Fire Emblem games were available worldwide. The development team ranked characters based on a variety of factors, such as their weapon type, narrative importance, emotional connection to players to determine inclusion. When including Robin and Corrin, the respective protagonists of Awakening and Fates who had selectable genders, the team chose their more iconic or popular genders as their default appearance (male for Robin, female for Corrin). Their alternate genders were included as unlockables. Popular characters Lyn from The Blazing Blade and Celica from Gaiden were included in other roles. Lyn was the only character included from The Blazing Blade so the team could focus down onto specific character narratives. Celica was chosen for inclusion over her counterpart Alm to avoid replicas of other Fire Emblem leads, and to have a magic-focused character. The History Mode was included so more iconic scenes could be included outside the main story. It was originally considered to scrap Awakening's Lucina from the game, both due to the large number of sword wielders, and due to her being one of the children of Awakening's cast members. Usuda stated in an interview that this discussion occurring was emblematic of how difficult character selection was, though that they went "too far" in Lucina's case due to her importance in Awakening's narrative.

The game's art director was Yuta Matsunaga, who was selected by Hayashi from a number of volunteer candidates. The first character designed for both 2D and 3D was Awakening protagonist Chrom, with Matsunaga saying he needed to get Chrom's design right before the other characters could be designed. Matsunaga needed to strike a balance between the original character designs, the game's graphical design, and input from Intelligent Systems. The twins Rowan and Lianna were designed to appear different from other Lord characters within the Fire Emblem series. Lianna was originally considered to use a lance as a weapon, with Rowan using an axe, but it was decided both should be sword users for the simplicity of new players, as they felt the weapons differing among the protagonists would be "unfair". To keep the game's CERO rating low, some characters such as Camilla from Fates had small clothing redesigns to portray them as "cute" rather than suggestive. Some idle animation poses, such as those of Chrom and Lucina, also needed changing to be more distinct from each other. Lyn's character design was based on both the original character art and her character model from the Super Smash Bros. series. The original monsters were difficult to design, with early designs being compared negatively by Hayashi to plushies. To fix the issue, the team emphasised their crustacean-like armor and using colors inspired by poisonous animals. Original music tracks were composed by sound director Yosuke Kinoshita. The soundtrack mostly consisted of remixes of earlier Fire Emblem tracks arranged by Kinoshita, Kosuke Mizukami, and Shinichiro Nakamura. Voice recording for the whole game took three months.

== Release ==
Fire Emblem Warriors was announced on January 12, 2017 during the Nintendo Switch Presentation live event unveiling the console. The New Nintendo 3DS version was confirmed for a simultaneous release during the dedicated Fire Emblem Nintendo Direct stream the following week. As part of the game's promotion, the team made regular use of trailers revealing and showing off the playable characters. Fire Emblem Warriors was published on September 28, 2017 in Japan by Koei Tecmo, and on October 20 in North America and Europe by Nintendo. A Limited Edition was released alongside the standard versions which included character cards and a three-disc soundtrack. A further "Treasure Edition" also released in Japan, which also included a glass statue. The Switch version is also compatible with Nintendo's successor console Nintendo Switch 2, seeing improved performance and load times.

=== Downloadable content ===
Post-launch downloadable content (DLC) was announced for the game in September 2017, and split into three packs. Players could purchase all three as part of a Season Pass, unlocking an additional character costume. The characters were designed to have strong abilities, although the team were careful not to disrupt the in-game balance. While Darios's fate in the story was left deliberately vague so he could potentially be brought back in a free DLC update, the team instead chose to focus on established Fire Emblem characters.

The Japanese voice tracks was released for the English version as a free download alongside the game's launch. A free patch released on November 16, which included new gameplay elements and costumes; the Japanese release also included the English voice pack as a download. The dual voice track options were included due to fan requests from both Japan and English-speaking regions, and had to be released as DLC due to space limitations with the New 3DS hardware. Further patches were released alongside the DLC which raised the character level cap, expanded gameplay elements, and added quality of life elements.

The first DLC pack, released on December 21, 2017, featured the characters Azura, Oboro and Niles from Fates as playable characters. Azura was included as Hayashida wanted a "unique" character for Warriors, and was initially left out due to there being multiple characters from Fates already planned for the base game and they wanted to do her combat style justice. Oboro and Niles were included based on their popularity among the Fire Emblem community. The second DLC pack, released on February 15, 2018, included Navarre, Minvera and Linde from Shadow Dragon. In an interview discussing the new characters, Usuda stated that Navarre was chosen due to already being an NPC within the game, but writing his Bond events was tricky due to his established cold personality. Minerva was included as a well-known axe-wielding character and Linde to add variety to gameplay through her magical abilities. The third and final pack, released on March 29, included Owain, Tharja and Olivia from Awakening. Hayashi wanted to include Tharja as a DLC character from the outset, and had been trying to include her in the base game until late into production. Owain's portrayal leaned into the number of swords he possessed, and his comedic elements from his original game. Olivia was the last DLC character to be decided upon, partly due to her sharing a similar gameplay style to Azura, rather than using another swordsman or creating another new combat style.

== Reception ==
Reception

Aggregate scores
Aggregator	Score
Metacritic	69/100 (3DS); 74/100 (NS)
OpenCritic	51% recommend (Note: Based on 96 reviews.)

Review scores
Publication	Score
Destructoid	6.5/10
Eurogamer	Recommended
Famitsu	9/10, 9/10, 9/10, 9/10 (3DS and Switch)
Game Informer	7.5/10
GameSpot	6/10
IGN	8/10
Nintendo Life	7/10 (New 3DS); 8/10 (Switch)
Nintendo World Report	8/10
Polygon	7.5/10
RPGFan	90%

The Nintendo Switch version sold 41,491 copies within its first week on sale in Japan, while the New Nintendo 3DS version sold 18,357 copies. In the United States, both versions were among the top ten best-selling Nintendo titles in the region; the Switch version was the fourth best-selling, while the New 3DS version was the sixth. In April 2018, Koei Tecmo revealed that the game sold 1 million copies worldwide.

Fire Emblem Warriors received mixed reviews according to review aggregator website Metacritic, with the Nintendo Switch version holding a score of 74/100 based on 72 critic reviews and the New Nintendo 3DS version receiving a score of 69/100 based on 12 reviews. Among reviewers much of the praise went to the gameplay and mission design, along with how Fire Emblem mechanics had been incorporated into the established Warriors gameplay style. When mentioned, the graphics were also praised, but the music saw mixed reactions, and the English dub was generally faulted. Reactions to the story were indifferent or negative, with criticism focusing on its writing and tone compared to the main Fire Emblem series, and limited representation within its character roster. Framerate issues on the Switch version and poor AI during combat were also noted. (Note: Destructoid, GameSpot, IGN, Famitsu, Polygon, RPGFan, Nintendo Life, Nintendo World Report, Game Informer, and Eurogamer.)

Japanese magazine Famitsu gave similar praise to both the Switch and New 3DS versions, focusing their comments on the gameplay design and number of homages to Fire Emblem titles within the story and Bond conversations. Nathan Lee of RPGFan felt that it was the best Warriors game he had played due to its gameplay design, positively comparing its crossover status to both Hyrule Warriors and Tokyo Mirage Sessions ♯FE (2015). Meghan Sullivan of IGN highlighted the game's focus on strategic elements and more varied objectives, commenting that it was "hard to be bored in the face of so much wonderful fan service." Donald Theriault of Nintendo World Report enjoyed much of the combat and praised the History and co-op modes, but felt the missions could become chaotic. Eurogamer's Simon Parkin also enjoyed the gameplay structure and the strategic elements of missions, with his main complaint being constant interruptions to mission flow through side missions and the need to micromanage equipment for units.

Polygon's Janine Hawkins summed the game up as "an exemplary marriage of two series", with her main faults being with its narrative and the Switch version's technical performance. Damien McFerran of Nintendo Life reviewed both the New 3DS and Switch versions, with his general praise going to the deeper gameplay systems compared to other Warriors titles; while he noted that the New 3DS version was mechanically identical and had a stable framerate, he recommended the Switch version due to its higher graphical quality. Javy Gwaltney, writing for Game Informer, had fun with the mission structure, but faulted both the lack of effective AI for NPCs and underwhelming graphics for both environments and standard enemies. Destructoid's Chris Carter praised the difficulty balance and additional modes, while his main complaints focused on the limited roster and poor writing of the main story campaign. Jeremy Winslow of GameSpot was fairly critical of the game's narrative and technical issues, while also faulting a lack of truly new features for the Warriors-style gameplay design.

== Legacy ==
During the development of Fire Emblem Warriors, Intelligent Systems were working on the next mainline entry, Fire Emblem: Three Houses for the Switch. Wanting the game to release by 2019, Intelligent Systems contacted Hayashi about the possibility of Koei Tecmo assisting development. Hayashi agreed, and Three Houses was co-developed with Koei Tecmo's Kou Shibusawa division.

After production finished on Three Houses, Koei Tecmo approached Nintendo and Intelligent Systems about developing a sequel to Fire Emblem Warriors; due to their earlier collaboration, it was decided to produce a follow-up based on the Three Houses setting. Hayashi returned as producer, while Hayato Iwata came on board as director and Intelligent Systems's Toshiyuki Kusakihara acted as character designer and project supervisor. The game, titled Fire Emblem Warriors: Three Hopes, released worldwide on June 24, 2022 for the Switch.
