= List of monarchs of fictional countries =

This is a list of fictional monarchs – characters who appear in fiction as the monarchs (kings, queens, emperors, empresses, etc.) of fictional countries. They are listed by country, then according to the production or story in which they appeared.

Lists of fictional presidents of the United States
A–B	C–D	E–F
G–H	I–J	K–M
N–R	S–T	U–Z
Fictional presidencies of historical figures
A–B	C–D	E–G
H–J	K–L	M–O
P–R	S–U	V–Z

== A ==
=== Kingdom of Aceshin ===
The Kingdom of Aceshin is one of the three fantasy kingdoms featured in the video game, ASH: Archaic Sealed Heat.

- Queen Aceshin XV (voiced by Yoshiko Sakakibara) is a regnant whose Kingdom of Aceshin is attacked and burned into ash by a fire monster called the Flame Serpent. Her daughter, Princess Maritie, goes after the Flame Serpent as she accompanies Princess Aisya of Millinear and her allies in order to restore all the kingdoms. Queen Aceshin later sacrifices herself to hold back a soldier from the future, Bamyganant, allowing the party to escape on airship but then returning in ash form.

=== Kingdom of Acorn ===
The Kingdom of Acorn is featured in the Archie Comics series, Sonic the Hedgehog. Its capital is originally a peaceful multi-cultural city called Mobotropolis (renamed "Robotropolis").

- King Maximillian Acorn (also known as King Nigel Acorn) is the rightful ruler of the Kingdom of Acorn, and the father of Prince Elias and Princess Sally, who has been betrayed and overthrown by the evil Doctor Eggman following a coup d'état against his kingdom.
- Prince Elias Acorn becomes the new king of the Kingdom of Acorn after his father's abdication due to his poor health. As with his sister Sally Acorn being a co-leader of the small band of Freedom Fighters alongside Sonic, Elias reigns for a brief time until his kingdom is claimed by the royal wizard, Walter Naugus.

=== Kingdom of Adarlan ===
The Kingdom of Adarlan, also known as the Adarlanian Empire, is a central setting in the high fantasy novel series Throne of Glass by Sarah J. Maas. It is ruled by the Havilliard family.

- Dorian Havilliard the First
  - He was a tyrannical king who conquered almost all of the neighboring kingdoms around Adarlan and relished slavery and murder He imprisoned a young assassin, Celaena Sardothien, to slave away in the salt mines of Endovier. But with the help of the king's son, Prince Dorian, and the Captain of the Guard, Chaol Westfall, Celaena escaped from the slave camp and must participate in the competition to become the King's Champion. It was later revealed in Queen of Shadows that King Dorian was brainwashed by the Valg demon who had forced him to destroy every single kingdom. He was then killed by Prince Dorian in his revenge.
- Dorian Havilliard the Second
  - Formerly the crown prince, he becomes a new ruler of the Kingdom of Adarlan after killing his father. He is a close friend to Celaena and Chaol as he possesses a great deal of loyalty and is adept at solving problems and searching for the answers. He also possesses a raw magic ability, to which he hid it from his father.

=== Empire of Adrestia ===
The Empire of Adrestia is one of the three main countries on the fictional continent of Fódlan in the video game, Fire Emblem: Three Houses, and its spin-off, Fire Emblem Warriors: Three Hopes.

- Wilhelm Paul Hresvelg
  - He was the first monarch who along with Saint Seiros of the Church of Seiros (aka Archbishop Rhea) founded the Empire of Adrestia and raised an army in pursuit of unifying Fódlan, before the evil Nemesis, the King of Liberation, noticed Adrestia's efforts and railed his forces, the Liberation Army, to confront his enemy, thus sparking the War of Heroes. Wilhelm was eventually succeeded by Emperor Lycaon, whose death led the War of Heroes to finally end after the Adrestian Army achieved victory with Seiros slaying Nemesis.
- Ionius von Hresvelg IX (voiced by Paul St. Peter)
  - He was the previous emperor of Adrestia and the head of House Hresvelg who had multiple empress consorts, including Anselma von Arundel (who later becomes Lady Patricia of Faerghus). During the coup of the Insurrection of the Seven, Ionius lost the power struggle to the Prime Minister, Duke Ludwig von Aegir, and other imperial noble houses and was rendered politically impotent. He even had Lord Volkhard von Arundel, Anselma's brother who returned from Faerghus to Adrestia as its regent, allied himself publicly with Duke Aegir to capture Ionius's children, except one daughter Princess Edelgard, and infuse them with two "Crests" in an attempt to create a powerful, peerless emperor.
- Edelgard von Hresvelg (voiced by Tara Platt)
  - Formerly the crown princess and heir apparent, she becomes the crowned empress of the Empire of Adrestia after her father Ionius dies of illness and weakness. Edelgard is also the leader of the Black Eagles House, along with Prince Dimitri of the Blue Lions and Duke Claude of the Golden Deer, and disguises herself under a male persona, called the Flame Emperor, in her attempt to overthrow the Church of Seiros and conquer the other nations in Fódlan.

=== Aedirn ===
Aedirn is one of the Northern Kingdoms in The Witcher novel series by Andrzej Sapkowski and the adaptations in other media. It is ruled by the Aedirnian Dynasty.

- Aedireen, the queen of Aedirn in the 10th century.
- Baldwin, the king of Aedirn in the 12th century.
- Videmont, the son of King Baldwin. His daughter, Agnes of Aedirn, eloped with and married Esteril Thyssen. Though he originally opposed the union, Videmont grew to love their offspring all the way down to his great-grandson, Esterad Thyssen.
- Virfuril (portrayed by Ben Lambert), the 15th king of Aedrin who was known to prefer mages native to his country.
- Demavend III (portrayed by Richard Tirado) was the 16th king of Aedirn, succeeding his father King Virfuril. In the video game, The Witcher 2: Assassins of Kings, King Demavend was one of the victims of assassination of the witcher.

=== Alabasta Kingdom ===
The Alabasta Kingdom is the Egyptian-based island country in the Japanese manga and anime series, One Piece. It is ruled by the Nefertari family.

- Nefertari D. Lili
  - She was the queen of the Alabasta Kingdom and one of the twenty monarchs, who together known as the First 20 founded the World Government during the time of the Void Century. However, unlike other 19 monarchs, Lili was the only one who did not become a World Noble, believing in her needs to return to Alabasta and continue her reign. But before her return to her kingdom, Queen Lili mysteriously disappeared, leaving her brother to become a new ruler.
- Nefertari Cobra (also known as Nefeltari Nebra in English dub)
  - He was the 12th king of the Alabasta Kingdom whose wife, Queen Titi, had died twenty-four years prior and daughter, Princess Vivi (aka Miss Wednesday), has been aided by the Straw Hat Pirates, captained by Monkey D. Luffy, in her fight against Baroque Works. Cobra also had his kingdom's army called the Alabasta Royal Guard. During the Wano Country Arc, King Cobra was allegedly assassinated by Sabo, chief of staff of the Revolutionary Army, just when Vivi was reported to have disappeared.

=== Kingdom of Aldovia ===
Aldovia is a European kingdom appearing in A Christmas Prince (2017) and its sequels A Christmas Prince: The Royal Wedding (2018) and A Christmas Prince: The Royal Baby (2019).

- King Richard I
- King Richard II (portrayed by Ben Lamb) succeeds his father upon his coronation, despite being discreetly adopted.

=== Kingdom of Almyra ===
The Kingdom of Almyra is a country at the far east of the fictional continent of Fódlan in the video game, Fire Emblem: Three Houses, and its spin-off, Fire Emblem Warriors: Three Hopes.

- Tiana von Riegan
  - She was the daughter of Duke Oswald, the head of the noble House Riegan and the de facto leader of the Leicester Alliance. Though being devoted to the nobles of the Alliance, she left to the Kingdom of Almyra to marry its King, with whom she had a son Prince Khalid. Godfrey, Tiana's brother and heir to House Riegan, died in an accident, to which some speculated he was killed by Count Gloucester in order to seize the Alliance's leadership for himself. While Tiana remained in Almyra, she and the King gave Khalid their blessings, allowing him to travel to Fódlan under the name Claude von Riegan.
- Claude von Riegan (voiced by Joe Zieja)
  - He was born as Prince Khalid to the King of Almyra but took up the pseudonym Claude von Riegan as he traveled for the Leicester Alliance, announcing himself as the legitimate heir of House Riegan. He has found himself discriminated against due to his mix-blood of both Almyra and Leicester. Claude is also the leader of the Golden Deer House, along with Princess Edelgard of the Black Eagles and Prince Dimitri of the Blue Lions. He eventually becomes the new king of Almyra and the leader of the Alliance. In Three Hopes, he defends the Alliance's eastern border from the invasion of his half-brother, Prince Shahid.

== B ==
=== Kingdom of Belgravia ===
Belgravia is a European kingdom appearing in The Princess Switch trilogy.

- King George (portrayed by Pavel Douglas)

=== Kingdom of Borovia ===
Borovia is a European kingdom appearing in the British animated children's television series The Big Knights.

- King Otto (voiced by Timothy West) is a single parent whose plans to modernise Borovia are often accidentally squandered by the titular Big Knights, Sir Boris and Sir Morris. He is a single father to twin daughters, Princesses Lucy and Loretta, and has possibly the only Borovian automobile.

=== Brave Kingdom ===
The Brave Kingdom is a kingdom setting in Brave Animated Series.

- Old King (voiced by Ma Guo Yao)
- War King (voiced by Xu Huang Jia 許皇家)
- Business King (voiced by Sun Cheng 孫誠)

== C ==
=== Cagliostro ===
Cagliostro is the smallest European grand duchy in the Japanese anime film, Lupin III: The Castle of Cagliostro. It is derived from the Arsène Lupin novel The Countess of Cagliostro.

- Count Lazare d'Cagliostro
  - He was a villainous regent of Cagliostro whose arranged marriage would cement his power and recover the country's fabled ancient treasure, for which he needs the ancestral rings of both his and Princess Clarisse. Count Cagliostro sent out his men to find Clarisse in attempt to marry her with their rings. He was ultimately killed and crushed by the mechanism between the arms of the castle's clock tower after pursuing Clarisse and Arsène Lupin III, a gentleman thief who disrupted the wedding ceremony and foiled his evil plan. He is based on Italian occultist Count Alessandro di Cagliostro.
- Lady Clarisse d'Cagliostro
  - She is the last princess and rightful heiress of Cagliostro whose parents, the previous duke and duchess, were killed in a fire which destroyed the grand ducal palace. In spite of the Count's evil plan to marry, Clarisse is repulsed by his greedy and cruel personality and flees his presence during the try-on of her bridal dress. She is a friend to Lupin III who she has been rescued from her forced marriage to the Count. Later, after the Count was killed and defeated, she becomes a new ruler of Cagliostro. She is named after Clarisse d'Etigues, the wife of the original Arsène Lupin in The Countess of Cagliostro.

=== Calbia ===
Calbia is a small Balkan kingdom in the Doc Savage story, The King Maker, by Lester Dent and Harold A. Davis.

- Da Le Galbin was the first king of Calbia who has been overthrown when his kingdom is under siege.
- Clark "Doc" Savage, the scientist and detective, has been chosen by the Kingmaker to be the new ruler of Calbia during the terrorism.

=== Caledonia ===
Caledonia is a European sovereign kingdom in television series Scandal season five episode "Heavy Is the Head". It is based on the United Kingdom.

- Queen Isabel (portrayed by Dearbhla Molloy), former monarch of Caledonia. She makes a state visit to the United States to negotiate with President Fitzgerald Grant the opening of a new naval base and arranges the assassination of her daughter-in-law, Princess Emily, after she became pregnant during an affair with one of her security details. Isabel is based on Queen Elizabeth II of the United Kingdom.
- Prince Richard (portrayed by Adam Fergus) becomes monarch of Caledonia. After Olivia Pope reveals to him the role his mother played in the death of his wife Emily (having been originally hired to deal with press reaction to the incident), he forces her to abdicate on grounds of 'ill health'. He refuses to allow the United States to open a naval base in his kingdom. Richard is based on King Charles III of the United Kingdom.

=== Kingdom of Camelot ===
The Kingdom of Camelot is a nation within the landmass of Britannia in the Japanese manga series, The Seven Deadly Sins. It is the based on the English castle and court of the same name in Arthurian legend.

- Arthur Pendragon is a young king of Camelot and the wielder of the Holy Sword Excalibur. He is later resurrected as the "King of Chaos" by Merlin with the power to manipulate reality from becoming a vessel of Chaos. He is based on the famous medieval king of Camelot.

=== Candy Canyon Kingdom ===
The Candy Canyon Kingdom is a virtual reality setting in The Amazing Digital Circus episode, "Candy Carrier Chaos!"

- Princess Loolilalu (voiced by Vera Tan), the AI Candy Humanoid, is the ruler of the Candy Canyon Kingdom who helps the human players in the forms of the circus characters recovering a maple syrup tanker stolen by bandit non-player characters, led by Gummigoo. She also has to banish the candy-eating Fudge Monster after he started eating her citizens.

=== Carpathia ===
Carpathia is a Balkan country in the play, The Sleeping Prince, and its film adaptation, The Prince and the Showgirl.

- Prince Charles is the widowed prince regent of Carpathia whose mother-in-law is the Dowager Queen and who is in love with American actress Mary Morgan (or Elsie Marina in the film). He and his mother-in-law are inspired by King Carol II and Queen Marie of Romania.
- King Nicholas VIII, Charles's son, has been set to become a monarch of Carpathia even though he is still a teenage boy. He is inspired by King Michael I of Romania.

== D ==
=== Demon Kingdom ===
The Demon Kingdom is a kingdom setting in Brave Animated Series

- Old Morewant (voiced by Mickey Huang)
- Morewant (voiced by Fu Pin Cheng)

=== Devildom ===
Devildom is featured in the visual novel game, Obey Me!

- The Demon King is the ruler of the Devildom, but resides at the bottom as he has no interest in the affairs of the three worlds. His son, Diavolo, is the heir to the throne and the president of the Royal Academy of Diavolo student council.

=== Devotindos Empire ===
The Devotindos Empire is an antagonistic nation of pigs in the video game, Rocket Knight Adventures.

- Emperor Devligus Devotindos
  - He is a large, obese cyborg pig who acts like a ruler of the Devotindos Empire as he builds a powerful army to invade the Kingdom of Zephyrus, seeking the Key to the Seal of the Pig Star, a starship which has the power to destroy the planets. Devligus even has his Black Knight assistant, Axel Gear, kidnapping Princess Sherry of Zephyrus who knows the location to the key. Devligus soon finds the seal key and escapes into space to reach the Pig Star, where he is then destroyed by Rocket Knight leader Sparkster in a melee fight.

=== Dragon Kingdom ===
The Dragon Kingdom is a kingdom setting in Brave Animated Series

- Dragon Queen (voiced by Tseng Yun Fan 曾允凡)
- Dragon Killer Brave (voiced by Niu Kai Yang)

=== Dream Land ===
- King Dedede is a self-proclaimed monarch of Dream Land, although he has no interest in actually reigning, in the Kirby video game franchise. He is the archrival of the title character as he steals Dream Land's food supply, prompting him to travel to his castle and confront him.

== E ==
=== Kingdom of Eldia ===
The Kingdom of Eldia (formerly the Empire of Eldia) is a post-apocalyptic nation in the Japanese anime series, Attack on Titan. It was originally ruled by the Fritz family in the ancient time, and then by the Reiss family in the current time.

- Karl Fritz, King of the Walls
  - He was the 145th king whose people of Eldia retreated and confined to the last territory of Paradis Island after the downfall of the Empire of Eldia during the Great Titan War. To protect Eldia and other nations of the world from the Empire of Marley, King Karl built the three walls: Wall Maria, Wall Rose and Wall Sheena, all of which are named after the three daughters of King Fritz, the founder of Eldia. He also established the Reiss family to continue his royal bloodline with his heirs maintaining the ceasefire between Paradis and Marley, while he himself even took on the form of the Founding Titan to influence his blood-related successors.
- Lord Rod Reiss
  - He was the former king of Eldia and the true King of the Walls whose family have been the power behind the throne in Wall Sheena for generations, with each family head bestowed the power of the Founding Titan. When his daughter Princess Historia was born, Rod sent her and his wife Queen Alma to live on a land he leased, until his entire family was slaughtered by Dr. Grisha Yeager when he stole the Founding Titan during the incident of Wall Maria. When he was reunited with Historia, Rod tried to convince her to eat Grisha's son, Eren Yeager. But when Historia refused, he transformed into a massive and crawling Abnormal Titan, threatening the Orvud District. He was then killed after being cribbled by Eren and the Levi Squad using a cache of barrels filled with gunpowder.
- Historia Reiss/Krista Lenz
  - She is the last surviving heiress of the Kingdom of Eldia and the illegitimate child of the Reiss family. She lives on her family's farm within Wall Rose, during which time she only has minimal interaction with her mother Alma. Alma is then killed by King Rod's elite squad led by Kenny Ackerman after the fall of Wall Maria. But before Historia herself is killed, her father attempts to spare her by ordering she live among Wall Maria refugees under her alias of "Krista Lenz". She later joins the 104th Training Corps, the branch of the military dedicated to training and educating new recruits to become members of three other military branches: the Garrison Regiment, the Survey Corps and the Military Police Brigade. Eventually, Historia is a member of the Survey Corps and assumes the throne as the queen of Eldia and the Queen of the Walls.

=== Elephant Country ===
The Elephant Country is a West African kingdom in the Babar children's book series by Jean de Brunhoff.

- Babar is an anthropomorphic African bush elephant who is a selected king of the Elephant Country after the original king dies from eating a bad mushroom. He resides in his kingdom's capital, Celesteville, which is named after his consort Queen Celeste. He is also the father of Princes Pom and Alexander and Princesses Flora and Isabelle, and the grandfather of Prince Badou and Princess Lulu.

=== Elfhame ===
Elfhame is featured in The Folk of the Air series of books by Holly Black.

- High King Cardan Greenbriar and High Queen Jude Greenbriar (née Duarte) are the current monarchs. Cardan had succeeded Cardan's father High King Eldred, and Cardan had married Jude thus making her High Queen. The monarchs have a special magical connection to the land.
  - Jude is not a queen consort, but a co-monarch.

=== Enchancia ===
Enchancia is a primary setting in the Disney Junior animated series, Sofia the First. It is ruled by the House of Winslow.

- King Gideon Winslow IV was the previous ruler of Enchancia who ordered the guards to chase the trolls, who were banging clubs outside his castle, back under the cave and banish them there for three generations. But his wife mistakenly took the Crown of the Gnomes (aka the Crown of Blossoms), a magical tiara in which used for the kingdom's annual Festival of Plenty.
- King Roland Winslow I (voiced by Travis Willingham) succeeded his father Gideon as he was considered to be one of the best kings Enchancia has ever had, but put his heroics above his family life, and later had his widow Grand Mum to be the grand queen upon his death, although his royal sorcerer Goodwyn the Great saved his life nine and a half times, until their son Roland II ascended the throne.
- King Roland Winslow II (also voiced by Travis Willingham) is the current ruler of Enchancia, the father of twins Princess Amber and Prince James and the brother of Duchess Matilda, who in the pilot Once Upon a Princess marries the former cobbler Miranda Cordova to make her his queen, with whom he has a stepdaughter Sofia. He gives Sofia the Amulet of Avalor, a magical necklace in which has been coveted by his royal sorcerer Cedric who wants to use its power to take over the kingdom but fails after falling into an enchanted sleep during the ball.

=== Equestria ===
Leading Equestria are five regnant coregency princesses from the My Little Pony: Friendship Is Magic franchise.

- Princess Celestia (voiced by Nicole Oliver), the Princess of the Day and Joy.
- Princess Luna (voiced by Tabitha St. Germain), the Princess of the Night and Dreams.
- Princess Cadence (voiced by Britt McKillip), the Princess of Love and Family.
- Princess Twilight Sparkle (voiced by Tara Strong), the Princess of Magic and Friendship.
- Princess Flurry Heart, the Princess of Light and Hope.

=== Kingdom of Erusea ===
The Kingdom of Erusea (formerly the Federal Republic of Erusea) restores its monarchy in the video game, Ace Combat 7: Skies Unknown, ruled by the D'Elise royal family.

- Rosa Cossette D'Elise
  - She is a defensive yet pacifistic princess and heir who is set to become a ruler of Erusea after her father, King D'Elise, was killed in the bombing of the kingdom's capital, Farbanti. She has been convinced by the militaristic factions within the Erusean armed forces that the International Space Elevator is declared war on the Federation of Osea that seek to command the continent of Usea as with its 48th president, Vincent Harling, wanting to destroy the entire space elevator. After discovering that she has been misled, Princess Rosa joins the Osean aircraft mechanic, Avril Mead, in sabotaging the space elevator and ending the Lighthouse War.

== F ==
=== Holy Kingdom of Faerghus ===
The Holy Kingdom of Faerghus is one of the three main countries on the fictional continent of Fódlan in the video game, Fire Emblem: Three Houses, and its spinoff, Fire Emblem Warriors: Three Hopes.

- King Lambert Egitte Blaiddyd (voiced by Patrick Seitz)
  - He was the ruler of the Holy Kingdom of Faerghus who chose Anselma von Arundel (one of Emperor Ionius's consorts), who fled the Adrestian Empire with her brother Lord Volkhard and daughter Princess Edelgard, to be his queen under the alias of "Lady Patricia" during the Insurrection of the Seven. Lambert eventually died during the ensuing slaughter after the Tragedy of Duscur. He was the father of Crown Prince Dimitri.
- Rufus Blaiddyd
  - Originally granted the title of Grand Duke of Itha, he assumed the role of the regent of the Holy Kingdom of Faerghus as his nephew Dimitri was too young to inherit the throne after the death of his younger brother Lambert. It is mentioned that Rufus's temporary reign was jeopardized by rumors that he was complicit with the Tragedy of Duscur to claim the throne for himself as well as being a womanizer.
- Dimitri Alexandre Blaiddyd (voiced by Chris Hackney)
  - Formerly the crown prince, he becomes the new king of the Holy Kingdom of Faerghus, known as the Savior King, after the fall of the Garreg Mach Monastery. He provides Saint Seiros (aka Archbishop Rhea) and the remaining Knights of Seiros asylum as they do battle with his stepsister "Emperor" Edelgard and her empire for years, with Byleth Eisner eventually tipping the scale of the war decisively in favor of the Adrestian Empire, before Dimitri has been defeated in battle and then dies (ending varies). Dimitri is also the leader of the Blue Lions House, along with Princess Edelgard of the Black Eagles and Duke Claude of the Golden Deer.

=== Faramore ===
Faramore is a central setting in the animated video game, Arzette: The Jewel of Faramore.

- King Rahklin (voiced by Brandon Acosta)
  - He was the kindhearted ruler whose kingdom of Faramore was under attack by Demon Lord Daimur and the traitorous Duke Nodelki of Amelog. In response, Rahklin and his daughter Arzette, along with his advisor Wogram and the "unlikely hero" Dail, sealed Daimur in the Book of Oakurin using the magic of the Jewel of Faramore. Rahklin then ordered the protection of the Jewel that was shattered into five shards to prevent Daimur's release. Ten years later, however, Nodelki recovers the shards and frees Daimur who grants him magic powers and exacts revenge on Faramore.
- Princess Arzette "Arzy" (voiced by Angel Haven Rey)
  - She is a warrior princess who has been called to defeat Demon Lord Daimur and his four minions. Wielding her sword and magic, her goal is to relight the Sacred Beacons and recover the Sacred Candles to clear away Daimur's dark fog while retrieving the five Jewel shards from his forces. After her father King Rahklin died during her quest, Arzette becomes the queen of Faramore for defeating Daimur and Duke Nodelki and decides to reform the monarchy into a democracy.

=== Kingdom of Flanders-Wallonia ===
The Kingdom of Flanders-Wallonia is a Western European country in the Hearts of Iron IV game mod, Kaiserreich: Legacy of the Weltkrieg. It is a German puppet state that is deeply divided between the Flemish and Walloon populations.

- King Adalbert I is the third son of Kaiser Wilhelm II and the ruler of Flanders-Wallonia as he commands the Belgian army that are among the first to engage with the German armies during the Weltkrieg.

== G ==
=== Gilneas ===
Gilneas is one of the seven human kingdoms in the Warcraft video game series. It is ruled by the Greymane family.

- Genn Greymane (voiced by Cameron Folmar), the former king of Gilneas and one of the original founders of the Alliance of Lordaeron who transforms into a werewolf-like Worgen following the loss of his kingdom and his son and heir, Prince Liam Greymane.
- Tess Greymane (voiced by Elle Newlands), formerly the heir to the throne following her brother Liam's death, becomes the queen of Gilneas after its reclamation and her father Genn's abdication.

=== Duchy of Gransys ===
The Duchy of Gransys is a main setting of the video game, Dragon's Dogma.

- Edmun Dragonsbane (aka the Wyrmking)
  - He was the ageless duke who ruled the Duchy of Gransys for many years after conquering an evil dragon, Grigori. In actuality, he had not slain the dragon but had accepted its bargain and sacrificed his beloved in exchange for power sufficient to sate any desire. He and his subjects, even the Arisen, then lost their immortality upon defeating the Dragon. Edmun had several wives, including Lady Aelinor of Meloire, although he had no heir and none of his family was known to be alive. Duke Edmun's false claim to have killed the Dragon is obviously inspired by that of King Casiodorus's in the film Dragonslayer.

== H ==
=== Hytopia ===
Hytopia is a fashion-obsessed kingdom in the video game, The Legend of Zelda: Tri Force Heroes.

- King Tuft, His Royal High-Tops
  - He is the ruler of Hytopia whose daughter Princess Styla has been cursed by the Drablands witch, Lady Maud, to wear an irremovable brown jumpsuit. Depending on a prophecy's characteristics, Tuft summons Link and sends him and his two teammates to Drablands to defeat Lady Maud and lift Styla's curse.

== I ==
=== Kingdom of Ironforge ===
The Kingdom of Ironforge is the realm of the dwarfs in the Warcraft video game series, ruled by the Bronzebeard clan.

- King Magni Bronzebeard (voiced by Carlos Larkin) is a former monarch of the Kingdom of Ironforge during the Second War, and the older brother of Muradin and Brann Bronzebeard, who defends his kingdom from the orcs and joins the Alliance of Lordaeron. During a ritual in the heart of Old Ironforge, he is turned to diamond, sacrificing himself to save the subcontinent of Khaz Modan from the Cataclysm.

== J ==
=== Jade Empire ===
The Jade Empire is a Far Eastern nation inspired by Chinese mythology in the video game of the same name. It is ruled by the imperial Sun dynasty.

- Emperor Sun Hai (voiced by Armin Shimerman)
  - He is the villainous ruler of the Jade Empire who was once a dutiful and honorable monarch until he has become reclusive corrupted by his lust for power. He is made immortal by the Water Dragon and creates Death's Hand by binding the spirit of his late brother, Prince Sun Kin, to the armor. Hai's brother Master Sun Li rescues an orphaned child, who he calls them the "Spirit Monk", raising them in the isolated village of Two Rivers and training them in martial arts. And Hai's daughter Princess Sun Lian goes on covert missions under her alias "Silk Fox".

=== Jaddur ===
Jaddur is a Middle Eastern city in the British film, Arabian Adventure.

- Caliph Alquazar (portrayed Christopher Lee)
  - He is a ruthless and powerful sorcerer who poisons the rightful king of Jaddur in order to marry his wife. As a tyrant, he offers his stepdaughter Princess Zuleira's hand-in-marriage to Prince Hasan, the member of another royal family, if he can compete a dangerous quest for a magical white rose. So with the help of an orphaned boy named Majeed and a magic carpet, Hasan must have to face evil genies, fire-breathing monsters and treacherous swamps to reach the rose, defeat Alquazar and claim the hand of Zuleira.

=== Jalpur ===
Jalpur is the fictional Indian kingdom in the Disney Junior animated series, Mira, Royal Detective.

- Queen Shanti (voiced by Freida Pinto) is the monarch of Jalpur who appoints Mira to be a royal detective in her kingdom after solving a mystery that involved saving her younger son Prince Neel. Her older son is Crown Prince Veer, the heir apparent who is the aspiring king of Jalpur.

=== Jewelry Land ===
Jewelry Land is a kingdom of magical gems in the light gun shooter video game, Yoshi's Safari.

- King Fret of Jewelry Land
  - He is a ruler whose kingdom of Jewelry Land is attacked by Bowser and his seven minions the Koopalings, during which they kidnap him and his son Prince Pine and steal twelve magic gems. Fret and Pine are friends with Princess Peach of the Mushroom Kingdom, who sends Mario and Yoshi to defeat Bowser, retrieve the gems and save Jewelry Land from earthquake.

== K ==
=== Kakin Empire ===
The Kakin Empire is a kingdom located in the middle of the Azian Continent in the Japanese manga series, Hunter × Hunter. It is ruled by the Hui Guo Rou family.

- King Nasubi Hui Guo Rou
  - Nasubi is a ruler of the Kakin Empire and the sponsor of Beyond Netero's expedition to the Dark Continent. He has eight wives with whom he has 14 legitimate children, seven sons and seven daughters, who in which are officially titled "princes", regardless of gender, and acquire their Guardian Spirit Beasts and their parasitic Nen Beast abilities. Cold and ruthless, King Nasubi announces a Succession War to decide which of his children will succeed the throne, only to show no remorse in having them killed in a deathmatch while on board the giant Black Whale No. 1 transport ship.

=== Katvarna Empire ===
The Kartvarna Empire is a major setting in the Japanese anime series, Alderamin on the Sky.

- Chamille Kitra Katvarnmaninik
  - She is the third princess of the imperial family whose Katvarna Empire is at war against the neighboring Republic of Kioka. Her father, the former emperor Arshankrut Kitra Katvarnmaninik, has abandoned her in Kioka where she would grow up with hatred for his mistreatment. She soon develops a precocious crush on a lazy womanizer, Ikta Solork, for rescuing her from drowning while on board the ship. Chamille hates how her country is in the latter part of its decline, and as she comes of age to become the new empress, she wants to destroy it for the better.

=== Kouka Kingdom ===
The Kouka Kingdom is featured in the Japanese anime series, Yona of the Dawn. It is governed by the five tribes: Sky, Fire, Wind, Earth and Water.

- Crimson Dragon King Hiryuu
  - He was the Crimson Dragon God who descended from the heavens and took on a human form to rule the Kouka Kingdom. However, he was forced to fight against humans who were living in an era full of evil and thirst for power, where they forgot about the Gods. As the world was on the brink of extinction, four other Dragon Gods joined Hiryuu's side as human warriors and helped him lead Kouka to prosperity. But King Hiyuu died after clearing Kouka of evil, and the four Dragon warriors walked separately from his castle, leaving the kingdom to develop into five tribes.
- King Il of Kouka
  - He was the pacifistic monarch of the Kouka Kingdom under the Sky Tribe whose daughter and heir, Crown Princess Yona, is the reincarnation of the Crimson Dragon King Hiryuu. According to Il, his wife Queen Kashi was killed by insurgents when Yona was six years old. But in truth, his older brother General Yu-Hon was the one who had killed Kashi. Il even sheltered Yona in the Crimson Dragon Castle, not allowing her to touch weapons and see the outside world.
- King Su-Won of Kouka
  - He becomes the 11th king of the Kouka Kingdom after murdering his uncle King Il to avenge the alleged murder of his father Yu-Hon. In the wake of his aunt Kashi's death, he comforted his cousin Yona and promised to be by her side in her mother's place. Su-Won is close childhood friends with Yona and her bodyguard Hak, the former general of the Wind Tribe, during which Yona secretly harbors romantic feelings for him.

== L ==
=== Lendard ===
Lendard is a fictional planet in the Kaede Cosmos containing at least two kingdoms in the Japanese manga series, Edens Zero.

- Queen Shaya Le Lendard
  - She is formerly a ruthless human queen of one of the kingdoms in Lendard. She becomes an android woman by the name of God Acnoella and one of the Oración Seis Galáctica (Spanish for "Galactic Prayer Six"), a group of six outlaws who are capable of "crushing" planets. Known as the "Mother of Dragons", God Acnoella commands cybernetic dragons she manufactures through the perpetual motion machine called Möbius.
- Princess Elsie Le Lendard (aka Elsie Crimson)
  - Formerly the crown princess, she is a benevolent space pirate captain and one of the Oración Seis Galáctica members who is notorious for conquering the "seven cosmic seas". She delivers the Edens Zero spaceship to Shiki Granbell, the sole human denizen of the robot-inhabited Granbell Kingdom theme park planet, to repay a debt to his adoptive grandfather the Demon King Ziggy. After dying on her consumed home planet with her childhood fiancé James Holloway, the prince of another one of the kingdoms in Lendard whose code name is "Justice", Elsie is reborn as the new queen in Universe Zero and the director of operations for the Interstellar Union Army. Elsie is modeled after Erza Scarlet from the Fairy Tail series.

=== Holy Levamme Empire ===
The Holy Levamme Empire is featured in the Japanese anime film, The Princess and the Pilot.

- Juana del Moral (voiced by Seika Taketomi)
  - She is the daughter of the noble family del Moral with silvery hair who is meant to become a princess consort as the wife of Crown Prince Carlo of Levamme. However, the royal marriage is abruptly postponed as the Holy Levamme Empire is at war with its enemy state, the Amatsuvian Empire. Juana soon becomes subjected to an assassination attempt when the fighter pilots of Amatsuvia bombard her mansion and kill her father, Diego del Moral. But Charles Karino, the mercenary air pilot who is often mistreated due to his mix-blood of Levamme and Amatsuvian native, escorts her back to the mainland by flying past the enemy line. Juana later becomes the empress of Levamme and goes on creating lasting peace between the two warring countries.

=== Kingdom of Liberl ===
The Kingdom of Liberl is part of the fictional continent of Zemuria in the video game, The Legend of Heroes: Trails in the Sky.

- King Edgar von Auslese III was the 25th monarch of the Kingdom of Liberl who was keen to advance his kingdom's orbal technology by donating a large amount of money to the Zeiss Engineering Factory.
- Queen Alicia von Auslese II becomes the 26th and current monarch of the Kingdom of Liberl after her father Edgar's death. She is the grandmother of Crown Princess Klaudia von Auslese and the aunt of Duke Dunan von Auslese.

=== Kingdom of Liones ===
The Kingdom of Liones is featured in the Japanese manga series, The Seven Deadly Sins.

- Bartra Liones is a former king of Liones, the father of Princesses Margaret and Veronica and the adoptive father of Elizabeth Liones. His inherent power is Vision, which allows him to acknowledge the future of a second Holy War.
- Meliodas, the captain of the Seven Deadly Sins, becomes the new king of Liones after his father-in-law Bartra's abdication, with Elizabeth as his queen. Originally the demon prince and the leader of the Ten Commandments, he possessed the fragment of his father the Demon King's soul embodying Love until he turned his head when he fell in love with the Goddess Elizabeth, causing the Holy War to occur.

=== Kingdom of Lorule ===
The Kingdom of Lorule is an alternate version of the Kingdom of Hyrule in the video game, The Legend of Zelda: A Link Between Worlds.

- Princess Hilda
  - She is an evil counterpart of Princess Zelda who rules the Kingdom of Lorule. Her Triforce has been destroyed by the Lorulean Royal Family, so she plots to save her kingdom by stealing Hyrule's Triforce, conspiring with the evil sorcerer Yuga. But in the end, after being double-crossed by Yuga, Hilda decides to take Zelda, Link and the Triforce back to Hyrule, to which both Link and Zelda use it to restore Lorule by reviving its own Triforce.

=== Kingdom of Lucrece ===
The Kingdom of Lucrece is a medieval kingdom in the anthology video game, Live A Live.

- The King of Lucrece (voiced by Andrew Wheildon) was a ruler who lent his daughter Princess Alethea's hand to the knight Oersted after the fight with his rival Streibough. However, Alethea was kidnapped by subordinates of the Lord of Dark, leaving Oersted and his allies to go and rescue her (see princess and dragon). But after defeating the Lord of Dark that was actually a lesser monster in disguise, Oersted was tricked by a magical illusion into killing the King of Lucrece, causing his people to denounce Oersted as a demon and Alethea to blame him before killing herself.

== M ==
=== Marl Kingdom ===
Marl Kingdom is a main setting of the Rhapsody video game series.

- Ferdinand Marl E.
  - He is the former prince of Marl Kingdom who becomes the king when he turns eighteen and marries heroine Cornet Espoir, succeeding his mother Queen Siegrind Marl. In Rhapsody: A Musical Adventure, Prince Ferdinand has been turned to stone accidentally by a sexy witch, Majorly, who is meant to put him to sleep until he is rescued by Cornet and her fairy puppet friend Kururu. In the following sequel, Ballad of the Little Princess, King Ferdinand and Queen Cornet have a tomboyish daughter, Princess Kurusale Cherie Marl Q. (or Kururu for short), which is named after Cornet's puppet friend.

=== Mertropia ===
Mertropia is a kingdom above the ocean where merfolk magically disguise themselves as humans, in the Netflix animated series Mermaid Magic.

- King Seaford (voiced by Cedric Williams)
  - He is a merman king of Mertropia whose wife Queen Corelia is a fierce warrior but has gone missing and is presumedly dead during the battle against the evil pirate Barbarossa and his sea monsters. Strict and overprotective, Seaford wants to save his kingdom on his own and obsesses over keeping his daughter Princess Merlinda safe. But his brother General Orca has been training Merlinda to be a warrior like Corelia, and Merlinda herself is willing to help her father defending Mertropia alongside her two loyal friends, Nerissa and Sasha.

=== Kingdom of Metallicana ===
The Kingdom of Metallicana is a major setting in the Japanese manga series, Bastard!! Heavy Metal, Dark Fantasy. Its name is a tribute to American heavy metal band Metallica.

- The King of Metallicana
  - He is the current monarch whose Kingdom of Metallicana is attacked by the Dark Rebel Army, led by powerful wizard Dark Schneider, who seek to resurrect Anthrasax, the demon goddess of destruction. The King's son Prince Lars Ul (noted to be named after Lars Ulrich of Metallica) is cursed to transform into a baby dragon since he used the "Dragon Knight" robot in an attempt to kill Dark fifteen years prior. And the King's daughter Princess Shelia Tuel is one of the four seals of Anthrasax, sent away to Crimson King Glory for her safety after the first three were destroyed.

=== Kingdom of Millinear ===
The Kingdom of Millinear is one of the three fantasy kingdoms featured in the video game, ASH: Archaic Sealed Heat.

- Princess Aisya (voiced by Satomi Akesaka)
  - Aisya is a princess warrior who is set to become the first queen of the Kingdom of Millinear. During her coronation, however, a fiery Salamander burns her people into ashes. So she sets out in pursuit of the greater Flame Serpent, accompanied by her regent Bullnequ who is resurrected from the ashes, in order to restore her country. She also has to fight against the Fire Dragon, as well as the soldier Bamyganant and the King of Sumnelthia, alongside her allies including Dan, the soldier of Sumnelthia, Emu, a member of the Forest People, and Princess Martitie of Aceshin.

=== Mirage Kingdom ===
The Mirage Kingdom has occasionally appeared in the Pokémon: Advanced Challenge episodes, "The Princess and the Togepi" and "A Togepi Mirage!"

- Princess Sara of the Mirage Kingdom
  - She is rightfully the heiress to the throne who along with her parents, the King and Queen, find themselves involved in an attempted coup d'état by Colonel Hansen, the evil magistrate, who wants to rule over both the Mirage Kingdom and the Togepi Paradise. It is stated that the heir to the throne must be selected by a Togepi in order to become the next monarch. Sara soon finds one specific Togepi stolen by Team Rocket on behalf of Hasen, not realizing it is actually owned by Misty. Later on, however, the King and Queen are locked up in the dungeon, and Hansen is using Misty's Togepi to claim himself the new king. This leads to a confrontation, during which Misty's Togepi evolves into Togetic to save the other Togepi. After the subsequent arrest of Colonel Hansen, Princess Sara is given her own Togepi to allow her to ascend as the queen of the Mirage Kingdom.

=== Mobotropolis/Robotropolis ===
Mobotropolis is featured in the animated television series, Sonic Underground.

- Queen Aleena Hedgehog (voiced by Gail Webster), the former ruler of Mobotropolis and the mother of Sonic, Sonia and Manic Hedgehog. She has been overthrown by Dr. Robotnik who can seize control of her country, renaming it to "Robotropolis" under his command. Aleena has to separate her triplets to preserve the dynasty after being told by the Oracle of Delphius of a prophecy.

=== Monteblanco ===
Monteblanco is a main setting in the silent film, The Merry Widow, a loose adaptation of Franz Lehár's operetta of the same name.

- King Nikita I and Queen Milena (portrayed by George Fawcett and Josephine Crowell)
  - The rulers of Monteblanco whose nephew Prince Danilo Petrovich falls in love with a folly dancer, Sally O'Hara. When Danilo proposes to Sally, Nikita and Milena forbid the marriage because she is a commoner. They had a son and heir apparent, Crown Prince Mirko, to whom Danilo duels for Sally's affection. And after Mirko is assassinated, Prince Danilo becomes the heir to the throne and reclaims his engagement to Sally whose wealthy husband, Baron Sixtus Sadoja, has died from a stroke.

=== Montenaro ===
Montenaro is a European kingdom appearing in The Princess Switch trilogy, alongside its neighbouring kingdom of Belgravia.

- Queen Margaret (portrayed by Vanessa Hudgens) accedes to the throne on the death of her father in the second film.

=== Moon Kingdom ===
The Moon Kingdom was an ancient civilization that existed on the moon, ruled by the queen regnants, in the Sailor Moon franchise.

- Queen Serenity
  - She was an incarnation of the moon goddess Selene who ruled the Moon Kingdom during the first Silver Millennium era. Princess Serenity, the Queen's only daughter and heiress to the throne, had a sacred duty to watch over the planet Earth, to which she fell in love with Prince Endymion of the Earth Kingdom. The Queen also had two advisors, Luna and Artemis, the two cats from the planet Mau. When the Dark Kingdom attacked the Moon Kingdom, Queen Serenity sacrificed herself to use the Silver Crystal to seal the amorphous dark energy, Queen Metaria, and reincarnate her daughter, Endymion, and the Sailor Guardians to be reborn on Earth. She eventually saved her spirit within a computer to preserve her will, appearing as a hologram.

=== Kingdom of Möridia ===
Möridia is a rich, prosperous European kingdom appearing in the British animated children's television series The Big Knights. It borders the titular Big Knights' homeland of Borovia.

- Queen Melissa (voiced by Prunella Scales) is the fabulously affluent monarch of Möridia. She is rumoured to have been married to Borovia's King Otto, who is envious of her and her country's success.

=== Mushroom Kingdom ===
The Mushroom Kingdom is a primary setting in the Super Mario video game franchise, and its adaptations in other media.

- Princess Peach Toadstool
  - She is the young founder and rightful regnant of the Mushroom Kingdom, raised by the Toads. She is initially a damsel in distress who is held captive by Bowser, the evil king of the Koopas (aided by his son and heir Bowser Jr. and seven minions the Koopalings), but is rescued by the two Italian-American brothers, Mario and Luigi (see princess and dragon). In the animated film The Super Mario Bros. Movie, Peach helps Mario saving Luigi, as well as their hometown in Brooklyn, New York City, from Bowser's clutches.

== N ==
=== Nilfgaardian Empire ===
The Nilfgaardian Empire is featured in The Witcher novel series by Andrzej Sapkowski and the video game adaptation, The Witcher 3: Wild Hunt.

- Torres var Emreis
  - He ruled the Nilfgaardian Empire from the Imperial Palace in the city of Nilfgaard since at least around 1135. He was considered to be the true founder of Nilfgaardian might.
- Fergus var Emreis
  - The Nilfgaardian Empire's Imperator during the early part of the 13th century until he was overthrown by the Usurper and his supporters a few years before 1237. 20 years later in 1257, his son and heir, Emhyr var Emreis, avenged his death and regained the power.
- Emhyr var Emreis (voiced by Charles Dance)
  - The intelligent and ruthless ruler of the Nilfgaardian Empire whose daughter Cirilla Fiona Elen Riannon is adopted by Geralt of Rivia. His empire has been at war against the Northern Kingdoms, both of which he loses.

=== Kingdom of Norta ===
The Kingdom of Norta is featured in the Red Queen novel series by Victoria Aveyard. It was ruled by the Silver House Calore up until the abolition of the Nortan monarchy by the Scarlet Guard.

- Caesar Calore I
- Caesarion Calore
- Julias Calore I
- Tiberias Calore I
- Tiberias Calore II
- Caesar Calore II
- Julias Calore II
- Julias Calore III
- Marcas Calore
- Aerion Calore
- Andura Calore (first queen regnant)
- Tiberias Calore III
- Leonora Calore
- Tiberias Calore IV
- Tiberias Calore V
- Tiberias Calore VI
- Maven Calore
- Tiberias "Cal" Calore VII

Maven and Cal respectively are main characters in the series.

=== Northern Water Tribe ===
The Northern Water Tribe is featured in the Avatar: The Last Airbender franchise. It is ruled by a hereditary monarchic chiefdom, compared to the Southern Water Tribe, located within the realms of the North Pole.

- Chief Arnook was the ruler of the Northern Water Tribe in Avatar Aang's time. His daughter Princess Yue was given life by the Moon Spirit, only to give it back when the Moon Spirit was killed in its fish form by Admiral Zhao of the Fire Nation Military.
- Chief Unalaq was the new ruler of the Northern Water Tribe, the father of twins Princess Eska and Prince Desna, and the paternal uncle of Avatar Korra, in the sequel series The Legend of Korra.
- Eska and Desna become the ruling chiefs of the Northern Water Tribe after their father is killed and defeated by their cousin Korra.

== O ==
=== Octopon ===
Octopon is a once-grand kingdom at the fictional planet Mer in the Hanna-Barbera animated series, The Pirates of Dark Water.

- King Primus
  - He was the ruler of Octopon who had been captured alongside his aide Avagon by the evil Bloth, the ox-sized pirate captain of the Maelstrom warship, after his fleet was destroyed. Although the seven captains accompanying Primus were able to escape with the Thirteen Treasures of Rule, the king himself made his own escape across the dark water back to his kingdom and to his son and heir, Prince Ren. When he was washed ashore, Primus was found by Ren, who has been raised by the lighthouse keeper, and encouraged him to protect Octopon shortly before he perished. Prince Ren soon begins his quest to seek treasures on the Wraith ship aided by his crew of misfits; Tula the ecomancer, Ioz the rogue pirate, and Niddler the monkey-bird.

=== Olympis ===
Olympis is a kingdom in the video game, Dragon Spirit, and its NES sequel, Dragon Spirit: The New Legend.

- Amur and Alicia
  - Amur is a warrior captain who is transformed into a powerful Blue Dragon by the sun goddess Arlia so he can rescue Princess Alicia of Olympis who has been captured by the serpent demon Zawell to be used as sacrifice. After defeating Zawell and the other demons, Amur and Alicia get married, becoming the king and queen of Olympis and having twin children, Prince Lace and Princess Iris. However, the evil Galda builds an army of demons, resurrects Zawell and captures Iris to hold her prisoner. Like his father King Amur, Lace transforms into a dragon to defeat Galda and save his sister (see princess and dragon).

== P ==
=== Penglia ===
Penglia is an Asian kingdom mentioned in A Christmas Prince: The Royal Baby (2019).

- King Tai (played by Kevin Shen) and Queen Ming (played by Momo Yeung) arrive in Aldovia to renew an early fifteenth century treaty that ended a long-running war over Silk Road trade.

=== Kingdom of Prairie ===
The Kingdom of Prairie is a floating archipelago in the video game, Tail Concerto.

- King Hound III (voiced by Jeff Hobbs)
  - He is an anthropomorphic dog who is a noisy but kind monarch of the Kingdom of Prairie and whose adventurous daughter Princess Terria often runs out of the castle without an escort, much to his annoyance. Because of this, Terria has been kidnapped by the feline air pirates called the Black Cat Gang, led by Alicia Pris, who are seeking the five special crystals in which serve as the power source for the robotic Iron Giant, until police officer Waffle Ryebread saves her.

== R ==
=== Remlia ===
Remlia is a fantasy kingdom featured in the NES video game, Astyanax: The Warrior of Remlia. It is a possible mistranslation of Lemuria.

- Princess Rosebud is a ruler of Remlia who is taken captive by the evil wizard Blackhorn to drain the power she possesses. Her fairy friend and advisor, Cutie, summons a 16-year-old boy from Greenview High School, Astyanax, to rescue her (see princess and dragon). After Cutie sacrifices her life and Blackhorn is defeated, Rosebud transports Astyanax back to his world where he and the reborn Cutie see her vision saying this is a reward for their bravery.

=== Rohan ===
- Eorl the Young, the founder and the first King of Rohan in the novel Unfinished Tales by J. R. R. Tolkien.
- Helm Hammerhead, the ninth King of Rohan and the father of Princes Haleth and Háma and Princess Hèra.
- Théoden, King of Rohan in the novel The Lord of the Rings.
- Éomer, maternal nephew of Théoden, becomes King of Rohan after his uncle's demise in the Pelennor Fields.

=== Grand Duchy of Rosaria ===
The Grand Duchy of Rosaria is featured in the video game, Final Fantasy XVI, ruled by the Rosfield family.

- Archduke Elwin Rosfield
  - The ruler of the Grand Duchy of Rosaria, the father of Clive and Joshua Rosfield, and the first husband of Duchess Anabella. Despite not being a Dominant of the Phoenix, he inherited the throne and treated his elder son Marquess Clive with kindness when he could. Elwin was brutally assassinated before his younger son Joshua during the attack of the Holy Empire of Sanbreque, causing Joshua to lose control of his Dominant powers and transform into Phoenix.

=== Kingdom of Rosas ===
The Kingdom of Rosas is a magical kingdom on an island off of the Iberian Peninsula in the Disney animated film, Wish.

- King Magnifico (voiced by Chris Pine)
  - He is the sorcerer king who along with his wife, Queen Amaya, is the founder of the Kingdom of Rosas. Magnifico is a sole keeper of hundreds of wishes entrusted only to him by every people from all over the world. But his royal assistant Asha, the girl who senses a coming darkness that no one else does, makes a passionate wish to a star in need to help protect the kingdom. His name "Magnifico" is Spanish, Portuguese and Italian for "magnificent".
- Queen Amaya (voiced by Angelique Cabral)
  - Formerly the queen consort, she becomes a sole ruler for the Kingdom of Rosas after her evil husband King Magnifico is sealed inside the mirror of his magical staff by Asha and the rest of the entire citizens. Upon sensing the presence of the Star who is sent to Earth by Asha and her goat Valentino, Amaya begs Magnifico not to make forbidden black magic to take away their people's wishes, for which he does so to increase his own powers. In the end, Queen Amaya helps the citizens of Rosas making their wishes come true on their own.

=== Rota ===
Rota is a city-state on the Northside of Kanto in the Pokémon anime film, Lucario and the Mystery of Mew.

- Lady Ilene is a current queen residing in Cameran Palace at the center of Rota. Ash Ketchum and his friends arrive at Cameran Palace for the annual Aura Guardian tournament, which honors Sir Aaron, an ancient hero aided by Lucario who sacrificed himself at the Tree of Beginning to save Rota and was an honored knight to Ilene's ancestor, Queen Rin. Ilene has her Pokémon, Mime Jr., and is assisted by her servant Jenny.

== S ==
=== Sauslind Kingdom ===
The Sauslind Kingdom is featured in the Japanese light novel series Bibliophile Princess by Yui. It is ruled by the Ashelard family.

- Christopher "Chris" Selkirk Ashelard
  - He is the crown prince and soon-to-be king of the Sausland Kingdom who takes Lady Elianna Bernstein for his fiancée, but only because of the added perk of gaining access to his royal library. His uncle, Theodore Warren Ashelard, is a curator of the Royal Archives.

=== Kingdom of Sauville ===
The Kingdom of Sauville is a small French-speaking country in the Japanese anime series, Gosick.

- Rubert de Gilet
  - He is the king of Sauville from the year 1897 who personally witnesses the supernatural powers of the alchemist, Leviathan. Despite his fears about his powers, he leads the kingdom with Leviathan's guidance. He is also married to the beautiful French lady, Coco Rose, at the time they became the king and queen. But in 1900, Rubert attempts to kill Coco upon his discovery on her mulatto son and kills her maid who switched places with the queen. During World War I, when Sauville is attacked by enemy forces and its capital Saubrème is looted, King Rubert orders the repatriation of non-Sauvillean citizens to their respective countries.

=== Principality of Selgina ===
The Principality of Selgina is a mountainous country situated in the Himalayas which appears in the Japanese kaiju film, Ghidorah, the Three-Headed Monster.

- Princess Maas Doulina Salno (portrayed by Akiko Wakabayashi)
  - Salno is a rightful monarch of the Principality of Selgina whose uncle wants to kill her so that he may rule. She is sent to Japan where she becomes possessed by a Venusian alien, claiming to be a prophetess who predicts about the alien-dragon King Ghidorah, while suffering an amnesia after jumping off an exploding plane. Naoko Shindo, the reporter, takes Salno to a hotel for an interview and saves her from Malmess, the assassin sent by Salno's uncle. Shindo, Salno and the twin Shobijin fairies then evacuate when Godzilla and Rodan are converging on the city and battling throughout the countryside. After being shot in the head by Malmess, Princess Salno remembers her true identity and blames him as a traitor right before he falls to his death.

=== Kingdom of Shintaro ===
The Kingdom of Shintaro is a nation on top of the mountain in animated series Ninjago Season 13, Master of the Mountain.

- King Vangelis/The Skull Sorcerer (voiced by Deven Mack)
  - He is the villainous monarch of the Kingdom of Shintaro who acquires his power from an ancient skull, called the Skull of Hazza D'ur, which can resurrect the undead Awakened Warriors. He takes control of the Dungeons of Shintaro hidden beneath his kingdom and enslaves the tribes of the elf-like Geckles and the brutish troll-like Munce to mine Vengestone for Princess Harumi of Ninjago and the Crystal King. But one of the ninjas, Cole, defeats Vangelis using the Spinjitzu Burst and he himself is arrested and dethrone by his daughter Vania.
- Princess Vania (voiced by Sabrina Pitre)
  - She is the princess and heir of the Kingdom of Shintaro. She takes an instant liking to Cole and aids the ninja, led by Lloyd Garmadon, upon the discovery of mines beneath the kingdom. When her father Vangelis is defeated, Vania becomes the queen of Shintaro and pledges her alliance to Cole and the ninja, while being a lover to the former.

=== Island of Sodor ===
The Island of Sodor is a main setting in the book series The Railway Series by Rev. W. Awdry and Christopher Awdry, and its adaptations in other media.

Kingdom existed from 1099 to 1263.

- Sigmund, the elected first king who reigned from 1099 to 1116.
- The last king was Andreas, who died in the Battle of Largs in 1263, along with his heir apparent, Prince Peter.

Afterwards, the island became a Regency, and the last Regent, Sir Arnold de Normanby, was made Earl of Sodor by King Henry IV. The surname was later altered to Norramby. In 1753, the Earldom was extinguished by attainder; but in 1873, after popular petition, Queen Victoria graciously restored the title to the rightful pretender, John Arnold Norramby. The Earls were active on the Council of the Duchy of Lancaster, and, as there is no Duke of Lancaster, the Earls were popularly, albeit nominally, called Dukes of Sodor. They were:

- John Arnold Norramby, 1st Duke of Sodor, reigned 1873 to 1894.
- Henry John Norramby, 2nd Duke of Sodor, reigned 1894 to 1915.
- Charles Henry Norramby, 3rd Duke of Sodor, reigned 1915 to 1941, and served in the First World War (also known as the Great War).
- Robert Charles Norramby, 4th Duke of Sodor, reigned 1941 to 1943, killed in action in the Second World War.
- Richard Robert Norramby, 5th Duke of Sodor, reigned since 1943, succeeded in his third year.

Both the 4th and 5th Dukes are mentioned in Duke the Lost Engine, while the 5th comes into Very Old Engines, where he opens the loop line of the Skarloey Railway. There is also King Godred, ruler of Sodor during Middle Ages whose crown was stolen by thieves, mentioned in the animated special Thomas & Friends: King of the Railway.

=== Principality of Soleanna ===
The Principality of Soleanna (also known as the City of Water) is a sovereign island country in the video game, Sonic the Hedgehog (2006). It is inspired by Venice, Italy.

- The Duke of Soleanna (voiced by David Wills)
  - The original ruler of the Principality of Soleanna, he was a chief scientist who during Shadow and Silver's time travel led his technicians a research program, called "Solaris Project", to manipulate time with the country's omnipotent sun god, Solaris, for the betterment of mankind as well as resurrection of his dead wife, the Duchess of Soleanna. But after the scientific accident, the wounded Duke handed over the Scepter of Darkness to Shadow to seal Mephiles the Dark, Solaris's conscious mind, and then used a Chaos Emerald to seal Iblis, Solaris's destructive power, within the soul of his daughter Elise right before he died.
- Princess Elise III (voiced by Lacey Chabert)
  - The only daughter of the Duke and Duchess, she is a sole ruler of the Principality of Soleanna, in spite of her young age, as she resides in the new castle when the old one at Kingdom Valley slowly falls into disrepair. However, Elise gets abducted by Doctor Eggman in an attempt to harness Iblis to help conquer the world, but she is rescued by Sonic multiple times (see princess and dragon). She has been told from her late father to never cry lest her tears unleash Iblis and destroy the world. Elise is also assisted by her two ladies-in-waiting, Anna and Sophia.

=== Stormwind ===
Stormwind is a kingdom controlling much of the southern continent of Azeroth in the Warcraft video game series and its film adaptation. It is ruled by the House of Wrynn.

- Llane Wrynn (portrayed by Dominic Cooper)
  - The king of Stormwind during the First War in both the first game, Orcs & Humans, and the film adaptation. He was killed by the half-orc Garona Halforcen, but before his death, wished that the champion of his kingdom would become a commander of the Human Forces against other orcs. He was also a beacon of hope for his people in times of darkness.
- Varian Wrynn (voiced by Chris Metzen)
  - Varian became the next king of Stormwind after his father Llane's death. He ruled with fierce love for his people and his son Prince Anduin. He was then killed by warlock Gul'dan's forces on the Broken Shore in World of Warcraft: Legion.
- Anduin Llane Wrynn (voiced by Josh Keaton)
  - He is the crown prince who is named the new ruler of Stormwind when his father Varian is abducted by the Defias Gang. But due to his young age, Anduin is unable to reign, and the task of regency has been given to Bolvar Fordragon, the high lord and venerated paladin of the Alliance. In Legion, after Varian is killed on the Broken Shore, Anduin permanently assumes the throne as Stormwind's next king. He travels to the Broken Shore where he meets with Genn Greymane and Velen. There, he finds his father's sword and, after being told by his vision to do "what a king must do", declares he is ready to lead his kingdom against the Burning Legion. He has also taken a position as a leader of the Alliance.

=== Sylvania ===
Sylvania is featured in the French play Le Prince Consort and its film adaptation The Love Parade.

- Queen Louise (portrayed by Jeanette MacDonald)
  - She is the regnant of Sylvania in her own right who has been royally fed-up with her people's preoccupation with whom she would marry. She later marries Count Alfred Renard, the military attaché to the Sylvanian Embassy in Paris who promises to be her obedient consort, despite his qualms.

== T ==
=== Talys ===
Talys is an island kingdom situated off Archanea's eastern coast in the video game, Fire Emblem: Shadow Dragon and the Blade of Light, and its DS remake.

- Mostyn, the first king of Talys who has united the island tribes into a kingdom. A close friend of King Cornelius of Altea, his daughter Princess Caeda becomes fast friends with Cornelius's son Prince Marth after his exile. But during the six-year War of Shadows, Talys is invaded by the Galder Pirates. Marth, Caeda, and several other knights rebel the pirates and rescue King Mostyn. He then concludes that he is ready to battle the Dolhr Empire by sending out Marth and his allies. Eventually, Marth and Caeda become engaged to be married.

=== Kingdom of Terrasen ===
The Kingdom of Terrasen is a supporting setting in the high fantasy novel series Throne of Glass by Sarah J. Maas. It is ruled by the Galathynius family.

- Aelin Ashryver Whitethorn Galathynius (also known as Celaena Sardothien)
  - She has been an infamous assassin in the Kingdom of Adarlan as she was betrayed and enslaved in the salt mines of Endovier but was given a chance to compete against other assassins in order to become the King's Champion. In Heir of Fire, when she travels to Wendlyn and meets Rowan Whitethorn there, Aelin learns that she is the long-lost princess of the Kingdom of Terrasen, and therefore its future queen. Aelin and Rowan are eventually married and become mates, with Rowan becoming her consort.

=== Thay ===
Thay is a nation in the Forgotten Realms setting of the Dungeons & Dragons role-playing game.

- Szass Tam
  - In the course of The Haunted Lands novel trilogy this undead spellcaster ousts his fellow members of the ruling Council of Zulkirs (each the leader of a magical order) and establishes himself as sole rule of Thay with the title of High Regent.

== W ==
=== Westeros ===
Westeros is a fictional continent within the world of the novel series A Song of Ice and Fire by George R. R. Martin and its television adaptation Game of Thrones. Most of the continent consists of a realm known as the Seven Kingdoms. The sovereign who rules the Seven Kingdoms is given the title "King of the Andals, the Rhoynar and the First Men, Lord of the Seven Kingdoms and Protector of the Realm" and rules from the Iron Throne.

Targaryen Dynasty

- Aegon I Targaryen (Aegon the Conqueror)
  - Conquered six of the Seven Kingdoms of Westeros with his sister–wives.
- Aenys I Targaryen
  - Eldest son of King Aegon I and Queen Rhaenys Targaryen.
- Maegor I Targaryen (Maegor the Cruel)
  - Younger half-brother to King Aenys I. Usurped the Iron Throne from the legal heir, his nephew, Prince Aegon the Uncrowned (firstborn son of Aenys I).
- Jaehaerys I Targaryen (Jaehaerys the Conciliator, The Old King)
  - Third-born son of King Aenys I. Legally usurped the Iron Throne from his uncle, King Maegor I.
- Viserys I Targaryen (The Young King, in House of the Dragon: Viserys the Peaceful)
  - Grandson of King Jaehaerys I. Chosen over his cousin Rhaenys and her children Laena and Laenor by the Great Council of 101 AC.
- Aegon II Targaryen
  - Firstborn son of King Viserys I and Queen Alicent Hightower. Usurped the Iron Throne from the legal heir, his half-sister, Rhaenyra, firstborn daughter of King Viserys I.
- Rhaenyra Targaryen (the Realm's Delight)
  - Eldest daughter of King Viserys I and Queen Aemma Arryn. Usurped by her half-brother King Aegon II.
- Aegon III Targaryen (the Dragonbane)
  - Grandson of Viserys I, son of Rhaenyra and Prince Daemon Targaryen.
- Daeron I Targaryen (the Young Dragon)
  - Firstborn son of King Aegon III.
- Baelor I Targaryen (Baelor the Blessed)
  - Second-born son of King Aegon III, brother to King Daeron I.
- Viserys II Targaryen
  - Grandson of King Viserys I, brother to King Aegon III, uncle to King Baelor I.
- Aegon IV Targaryen (the Unworthy)
  - Firstborn son of King Viserys II.
- Daeron II Targaryen (the Good)
  - Firstborn son of King Aegon IV.
- Aerys I Targaryen
  - Second-born son of King Daeron II.
- Maekar I Targaryen (the Anvil)
  - Fourth-born son of King Daeron II.
- Aegon V Targaryen (the Unlikely)
  - Fifth-born son of Maekar I. Chosen over Princess Vaella (granddaughter of Maekar I) and Prince Maegor (grandson of Maekar I) at the Great Council of 233 AC.
- Jaehaerys II Targaryen
  - Second-born son of King Aegon V
- Aerys II Targaryen (the Mad King)
  - First-born son of King Jaehaerys II
- Viserys III Targaryen (the Beggar King), pretender
  - Second-born son of King Aerys II Targaryen, and younger brother of Prince Rhaegar Targaryen.
- Daenerys I Targaryen, pretender
  - Younger sister of Rhaegar and Viserys, becomes heiress of the Iron Throne after her husband Khal Drogo murders Viserys.
- Aegon VI Targaryen (Young Griff), pretender
  - Alleged son of Prince Rhaegar Targaryen and Princess Elia Martell (it was supposed that both mother and son had been murdered by Gregor Clegane).

Baratheon Dynasty

- Robert I Baratheon
  - Former Lord of Storm's End, crowned King after his first cousin once removed, Aerys II Targaryen, was killed during Robert's Rebellion
- Joffrey I Baratheon
  - Known to the Seven Kingdoms as the eldest son of King Robert I. Actually a bastard born of incest between Robert's wife, Cersei Lannister, and her brother Jaime Lannister.
- Tommen I Baratheon
  - Younger brother to King Joffrey I, also a bastard born of his mother and uncle's incestuous relationship.
- Stannis Baratheon, pretender
  - Lord of Dragonstone and younger brother to Robert I. Claims the throne after declaring Joffrey and Tommen bastards born of incest.
- Renly Baratheon, pretender
  - Lord of Storm's End and younger brother to Stannis and Renly. Claims the throne with the support of House Tyrell.

The current monarch of the Seven Kingdoms is King Tommen I Baratheon.

Television Show

- Cersei I of the House Lannister
  - King Robert I Baratheon's widow, and mother of Joffrey and Tommen. In the Game of Thrones episode The Winds of Winter she is self-proclaimed Queen after her Tommen's suicide.
- Daenerys I Targaryen (Stormborn)
  - Daughter of King Aerys II. In the Game of Thrones episode The Iron Throne she becomes Queen by right of conquest after the Battle of King's Landing before being assassinated by her nephew and lover Jon Snow.
- Brandon I (the Broken) of the House Stark
  - In the Game of Thrones episode The Iron Throne, he is elected King by the assembled Lords Paramount of the Seven Kingdoms after the death of both Queens, Cersei and Daenerys.

=== Windemere ===
Windemere is a modern European kingdom in the animated film Barbie in Princess Power, ruled by the Thornton family.

- King Kristoff and Queen Karina Thornton (voiced by Michael Adamthwaite and Patricia Drake)
  - They are the rulers of Windemere and the parents of Princesses Kara, Zooey, and Gabby Thornton. They are caring, but overprotective of their daughters and disagree with Kara's wild behavior. They are first shown worried after seeing Kara crash into a tree after she fails to pilot a flying device her friends Madison and Makayla create for her. Kristoff and Karina are then even more angry when they find out she is the superheroine Super Sparkle. However, they later support Kara after she rescues them and her sisters from the evil Baron von Ravendale.
- Princess Kara Thornton/Super Sparkle (voiced by Kelly Sheridan)
  - The heiress apparent of Windemere, Kara has a need for speed and is often reckless because of it. After being kissed by a magical butterfly, she becomes Super Sparkle and goes out saving her kingdom (or just bringing criminals like thieves to justice). She and her cousin Princess Corinne (aka Dark Sparkle) team up to stop Baron von Ravendale from committing a coup and killing her family.

== X ==
=== Xin'trea ===
Xin'trea was a kingdom featured in the Netflix miniseries, The Witcher: Blood Origin.

- King Alvitir (portrayed by Mark Rowley), the ruler of Xin'trea who tried to unify the clans. He took control on his sister Princess Merwyn, but she sought to forge her own path. His kingdom was later merged into the Golden Empire under its empress Merwyn, with its capital becoming her seat of power.

== Z ==
=== Zambezi ===
Zambezi is a southern African kingdom mentioned in the 1991 comedy film King Ralph, presumably lying along the banks of the major river of the same name.

- King Mulambon (portrayed by Rudolph Walker) is received in a state visit to the United Kingdom by Ralph Jones, the newly-acceded American-born king. They share their concerns about the leadership expectations thrust upon them and their countries' economic prospects. Mulambon purchases £200 million worth of British mining equipment and opens three car engine plants in Britain.

=== Kingdom of Zamunda ===
Zamunda is an affluent African kingdom appearing in the comedy films Coming to America (1988) and its sequel, Coming 2 America (2021).

- King Jaffe (portrayed by James Earl Jones) arranges a bride-to-be for his heir, Crown Prince Akeem (portrayed by Eddie Murphy). Akeem insists that he will find a woman who will love him for who he is and travels to Queens to do so, romancing Lisa McDowell. When Jaffe and Queen Aoleon arrive in Queens to find Akeem, they reveal his identity and bring him home for his arranged marriage. However, Aoleon scolds Jaffe for ignoring their son's happiness by touting tradition, prompting Jaffe to allow Akeem to marry Lisa according to his own wishes.
- King Akeem succeeds his father in the sequel, learning that he has an illegitimate son in New York conceived during the first film. Akeem returns to New York to find him; Akeem intends to prevent a succession crisis due to Zamundan law following absolute primogeniture.

=== Kingdom of Zephyrus ===
The Kingdom of Zephyrus is a nation of opossums in the video game, Rocket Knight Adventures.

- El Zephyrus
  - He was the first king of Zephyrus and the hero who led his clan to defeating the invading Devotindos Empire that constructed a starship, called the Star Pig, in order the destroy their planet. He used his magic to seal the starship and had the Key to the Seal to be guarded by his royal family over generations, as well as forming an elite group of warriors known as the Rocket Knights to protect the Kingdom of Zephyrus.
- King Zephyrus
  - He is a current ruler of the Kingdom of Zephyrus, and the descendant of the royal family that has protected the Key to the Seal, devoted by his people for his tolerant and fair reign. During the Devotindos Empire's invasion of the kingdom, the King's naïve daughter Princess Sherry has been kidnapped by the exiled Black Knight, Axel Gear, in order her to locate the seal key. Sparkster, an orphan possum who has been trained to be a Rocket Knight by the King's friend Mifune Sanjulo, sets out to rescue Sherry and destroy the Star Pig.

=== Kingdom of Zilkhstan ===
The Kingdom of Zilkhstan, known as the "Land of Warriors", is a theocratic monarchical diarchy in the Japanese anime film, Code Geass Lelouch of the Re;surrection.

- King Shalio was a young, fierce monarch of the Kingdom of Zilkhstan and the talented pilot of the Knightmare Frame war machine, despite his disability. His Knightmare Frame was the Nagid Shu Mane, serving as his personal machine. He may be even shares some similarities with Nunnally Lamperouge.
- Princess Shamna, Shalio's older sister and high priestess, was the queen and co-ruler of the Kingdom of Zilkhstan. She kidnapped Nunnally and her bodyguard Suzaku Kururugi and used Geass to travel back six hours in the past when she died, allowing her to predict the coming actions. But after Shalio was killed by Suzaku in a combat, Shamna's soul was permanently destroyed.

== Miscellaneous ==
=== Dragon Ball Z ===
- King Vegeta III was the last king of the Saiyans and the father of Princes Vegeta IV and Tarble in the Japanese anime series, Dragon Ball Z. He was also the commanding hero of the Saiyan Army, leading his people to victory in the Saiyan-Tuffle war, in which the planet was renamed in his honor. He was later killed by Frieza during the Genocide of the Saiyans.

=== Nimona ===
The science fantasy graphic novel, Nimona, and its animated film adaptation are set in the futuristic kingdom.

- The King
  - He was the ruler of the kingdom in the graphic novel. Ballister Blackheart, the banished former knight, at least once attempted to clone the King's daughter for some reason. The titular shapeshifter, Nimona, modified the plan to involve murdering the King and placing Ballister on the throne, for which Ballister refused. The King was killed after Nimona, in the form of a dragon, attacked the palace.
- Queen Valerin
  - She was the regnant of the kingdom in the film adaptation. Similarity, Valerin had been killed by a mysterious laser shot from the sword of Ballister Boldheart during the knighting ceremony.

== See also ==
- List of fictional monarchs of real countries
- List of fictional nobility
- List of fictional prime ministers of the United Kingdom
- List of fictional politicians
- List of fictional political parties
- Lists of fictional presidents of the United States
- List of fictional princes
- List of fictional princesses
- List of fictional dictators
