= Crescent City (novel series) =

Book series by Sarah J. Maas

- House of Earth and Blood (2020); House of Sky and Breath (2022); House of Flame and Shadow (2024)
- Author: Sarah J. Maas
- Language: English
- Genre: Romance, fantasy
- Publisher: Bloomsbury Publishing
- Published: March 3, 2020 – January 30, 2024
- Media type: Print
- No. of books: 3

Crescent City is a fantasy romance book series by American author Sarah J. Maas, that follows Bryce Quinlan, a half-fae, half-human girl and her life on Midgard. The first book in the series, House of Earth and Blood, was released March 2020. The series centers on Bryce as she teams up with fallen angel Hunt Athalar as they confront murders, uncover secrets, and engage in high-stakes political maneuvering.

As of April 2026, the series includes three books, House of Earth and Blood, House of Sky and Breath, and House of Flame and Shadow. There will be a fourth book added to the series; however, an official date has not been announced.

== Books ==
| No. | Title | Publication date | Counts | ISBN |
|---|---|---|---|---|
| 1 | House of Earth and Blood | March 3, 2020 | 816 pages | 9781635574043 |
Bryce Quinlan loves her life; she works all day and parties all night, until her best friend is murdered by a demon. Now she is being accused and forced to investigate the murder with Hunt Athalar, a Fallen angel who is enslaved to the Archangels. If he finds the murderer, he will be set free. Bryce and Hunt have to work together to find the demon that seems to be taking over Crescent City.
| 2 | House of Sky and Breath | February 15, 2022 | 816 pages | 9781635574074 |
Bryce Quinlan and Hunt Athalar want to live a normal life. The Asteri have left them alone so far, and they just want to relax. However, the rebels aren't slowing down against the Asteri, and Bryce and her friends get pulled into rebel plans.
| 3 | House of Flame and Shadow | January 30, 2024 | 848 pages | 9781635574104 |
Bryce Quinlan finds herself in another world, and all she wants is to get back to Midgard, and back to Hunt. She has to decide who she can trust, and hope that she can find a way back home. At the same time, Hunt finds himself back where he never wanted to be; the Asteri dungeons. All he can think about is where Bryce is, and if she is safe; however, he cannot do anything in the hands of the Asteri unless he escapes. Now that they know the truth about the Asteri, the future of Midgard is up to them.
