= Throne of Glass =

High fantasy novel series by Sarah J. Maas

- The covers of the eight books of the series
- Throne of Glass (2012); Crown of Midnight (2013); The Assassin's Blade (2014); Heir of Fire (2014); Queen of Shadows (2015); Empire of Storms (2016); Tower of Dawn (2017); Kingdom of Ash (2018)
- Author: Sarah J. Maas
- Country: United States
- Language: English
- Genre: Fantasy
- Publisher: Bloomsbury Publishing
- Published: August 2, 2012 – October 23, 2018
- Media type: Print (hardback and paperback); Ebook

Throne of Glass is an epic fantasy novel series by American author Sarah J. Maas, beginning with the entry of the same name, released on August 2, 2012. The story follows the journey of Celaena Sardothien, a teenage assassin in a corrupt kingdom with a tyrannical ruler, the King of Adarlan. As the story progresses, Celaena forms unexpected bonds and uncovers a conspiracy amidst her adventures. The series concluded with the eighth book in October 2018.

The series appeared on the New York Times Best Seller list, and was optioned by Hulu and Disney-ABC Domestic Television for a television series adaptation by Mark Gordon in 2016, but nothing came forward and the rights went back to the author.

== Overview ==
Throne of Glass follows Celaena Sardothien, an 18-year-old assassin in the Kingdom of Adarlan. After a year of suffering for her crimes in a slave camp called Endovier, she accepts the offer of Crown Prince Dorian Haviliard, the King of Adarlan's son, to compete with other assassins and thieves for a chance to serve as the King's Champion, and eventually gain her freedom after six years in the King's service. This leads her to form unexpected bonds with both Dorian and Chaol, the Captain of the Guard. Over time, Celaena is drawn into a conspiracy and a series of battles, leading to discoveries surrounding both the Kingdom and herself.

== Books ==
=== Main series ===
No.	Title	Publication date	Counts	ISBN
0	The Assassin's Blade: The Throne of Glass Novellas	March 04, 2014	118,431 words / 464 pages	9781619633612
A collection of five stories set prior to the Throne of Glass series, including four novellas previously published in e-book format: The Assassin and the Pirate Lord, The Assassin and the Desert, The Assassin and the Underworld, and The Assassin and the Empire, as well as The Assassin and the Healer. It follows Celaena Sardothien in her adventures traveling around Erilea with her companion Sam Cortland.
1	Throne of Glass	August 2, 2012	113,655 words / 432 pages	9781599906959
After a year of slavery, an infamous teenage assassin named Celaena is given the chance to become the tyrannical king's personal assassin/King's Champion by representing Prince Dorian in a competition against the most gifted thieves and assassins in the land. She must survive every test and trial in order to proceed to the final, in which she has to fight her remaining opponents. As candidates are found dead in the castle, their bodies ruptured, Celaena finds herself delving deep into mysteries concerning not only her, but her very own ancestors and the creatures of darkness that dwell deep beneath the castle.
2	Crown of Midnight	August 27, 2013	114,494 words / 448 pages	9781619630628
Celaena, the King's Champion, must win her freedom by butchering every person the king asks her to, but she cannot bear to kill for the crown. With every death she fakes, she puts her close friends at risk. Celaena must choose between a captain and a prince, and must battle forces more threatening than the king. She also reunites with an old colleague, becomes obsessed with a rebel movement, and learns more about the king's source of power.
3	Heir of Fire	September 2, 2014	163,266 words / 592 pages	9781619630659
Celaena travels to Wendlyn, a land where magic is still free, to undergo Fae training with the powerful and cold immortal Fae warrior Rowan Whitethorn. Tensions high between them, the pair must work together to stop evil forces wreaking havoc, and Celaena learns to accept herself as the Queen of Terrasen. Meanwhile, in Adarlan, Chaol teams up with General Aedion Ashryver to rebel against the King, and Dorian struggles to understand his growing powers. Manon Blackbeak, an immortal Ironteeth witch, competes in a competition against other witches in order to become the official Wing Leader of the clan.
4	Queen of Shadows	September 1, 2015	183,840 words / 672 pages	9781619636040
Stronger than ever, Aelin Galathynius (aka Celaena Sardothien) returns to Rifthold, this time as a free woman. Upon her return, she learns that much has changed since she left, including the capture of her long-lost cousin Aedion and the possession of her friend Dorian at the hands of a Valg Prince. Aelin teams up with Chaol's team of rebels and her former master, King of Assassins Arobynn Hamel, determined to get her revenge for over ten years of pain, by freeing magic, killing the King of Adarlan, and rescuing Dorian. Across Adarlan in Morath, Manon Blackbeak is forced to use her witches to produce evil monsters as weapons. As she struggles between her duties and growing morals, she befriends Elide Lochan, a servant girl who is the rightful lady of Perranth, and daughter of Aelin's nursemaid as a child.
5	Empire of Storms	September 6, 2016	195,332 words / 720 pages	9781619636071
Aelin is determined to never turn her back on her kingdom again. Cashing in debts to raise an army, Aelin and her court travel around Erilea in an attempt to stop Lord Erawan of the Valg, a demon-like race, from destroying the world, but with so many sworn enemies in want of revenge, including Queen Maeve of the Fae, survival seems unlikely. Aelin begins to realize that there are events in her life which may not have happened by coincidence; in fact, many have been pulling strings in the background long before she was born, and that she was destined for something far greater than she thought.
6	Tower of Dawn	September 5, 2017	191,282 words / 688 pages	9781681195773
Taking place during the events of Empire of Storms, Chaol Westfall travels to the Southern Continent with Nesryn Faliq to seek treatment from the gifted healers there, and persuade the Southern Continent to ally with him and his friends in the brewing war against Erawan. Yrene Towers' attempts of healing him lead to her becoming entangled in Chaol's past, despite her own reservations against his loyalty to the very nation that prosecuted her family. Meanwhile, Nesryn improves relations with her family during her stay, and befriends Prince Sartaq.
7	Kingdom of Ash	October 23, 2018	272,682 words / 992 pages	9781619636101
After being locked in an iron coffin for months by Maeve, Aelin resists torture in hopes of returning to her kingdom. Rowan searches with his cadre and Elide to find Aelin, his mate and wife. At the same time, Aedion and Lysandra continue to defend Terrasen with the armies that Aelin gathered before she was captured, from forces that would seek to destroy it: Erawan. After successfully allying with the Southern Continent, Chaol and his group race to reach his friends before it's too late. Manon and Dorian grow closer as they travel in search of the Crochan witches to raise an army, the final Wyrdkey, and answers to their role in the war and as leaders of their respective kingdoms. In the final battle, Aelin and her friends succeed in destroying both Maeve and Erawan once and for all, bringing peace to the land.

=== Companion books ===
- Throne of Glass Coloring Book (2016)

=== Companion game ===
Embers of Memory, a two-person card game based on the Throne of Glass book series, was released in October 2019 by Osprey Games. It is set during the events of the final book in the series, Kingdom of Ash. The players are tasked with helping Aelin survive her imprisonment and ordeal at the hands of Maeve, diving with her into her memories and helping her find the way back out.

=== Reading order ===
The order in which to read the Throne of Glass series is discussed within the community due to the publication date of Assassin's Blade differing from when it occurs chronologically within the story. While the book's events are a prequel to the rest of the series, its publication occurred in 2014, after the publication of Crown of Midnight in 2013. Bloomsbury Publishing and Sarah J. Maas's publication site suggest reading in order of publication date, with Assassin's Blade listed after Crown of Midnight.

Additionally, Empire of Storms and Tower of Dawn overlap in their chronological events, which has sparked several 'tandem read' guides, which suggest the order in which to read each chapter of each book, concurrently.

== Characters ==
=== Main characters ===
- Aelin Ashryver Galathynius, also known as Celaena Sardothien, is the main protagonist of the series. When she was young, her parents were murdered, and she trained to become an assassin.
- Rowan Whitethorn: A full-blooded Fae who is over three centuries old; one of six elite warriors originally in Maeve's Cadre.
- Dorian Havilliard II: The king and formerly the Crown Prince of Adarlan.
- Manon Blackbeak: A witch and heir to the Blackbeak clan.
- Chaol Westfall: Captain of the Guard.

=== Supporting characters ===
- Elide Lochan: A human with Blackbeak blood.
- Yrene Towers: A Torre Cesme healer.
- Lorcan Salvaterre: Demi Fae;over 500 years old, one of six elite warriors originally in Maeve's Cadre.
- Lysandra Ennar: A former courtesan who worked with Arobynn Hamel.
- Aedion Ashryver: Aelin's cousin, demi-fae with enhanced senses but no magic.
- Maeve: Fae Queen of Doranelle.
- Gavriel: Fae; one of six elite warriors originally in Maeve's Cadre.
- Fenrys Moonbeam: Fae; one of six elite warriors originally in Maeve's Cadre.
- Elena Galathynius Havilliard: Demi Fae; First Queen of Adarlan.
- Princess Nehemia Ytger: A princess of the kingdom of Eyllwe.
- Sam Cortland: An Assassin of Arobynn Hamel's Assassin's Guild.
- Kaltain Rompier: A young lady who comes from a fairly rich family.
- Dorian Havilliard I: King of Adarlan.
- Arobynn Hamel: Head of the Assassin's Guild
- Nesryn Faliq: Former city guard of Rifthold.
- Asterin Blackbeak: Second in Manon's coven of 13 witches.

== Development ==
=== Background ===
Sarah J. Maas has cited Disney's Cinderella as an inspiration for writing Throne of Glass. While viewing the scene in which the heroine flees the ball, Maas found the soundtrack "way too dark and intense". This led her to re-imagine a number of details. "The music fit much better when I imagined a thief—no, an assassin!—fleeing the palace," she said. "But who was she? Who had sent her to kill the prince? Who might the prince's enemies be? A powerful, corrupt empire, perhaps?"

Originally known as Queen of Glass, the story initially appeared on FictionPress.com. Bloomsbury acquired the novel in 2010, and purchased two additional Throne of Glass novels in 2012. Publicist Emma Bradshaw noted Maas' "huge online following, particularly in the US". Additionally, Throne of Glass became the first Bloomsbury children's novel to be featured on Netgalley.com, attracting requests "from all over the world."

Following its acquisition by Bloomsbury, the story went through a number of revisions prior to publication. Regarding the tale's development, Maas stated, "In the 10 years that I've been working on the series, Throne of Glass has become more of an original epic fantasy than a Cinderella retelling, but you can still find a few nods to the legend here and there."

Sarah J. Maas began writing the Throne of Glass Series in 2002 when she was 16 years old.

=== Characters ===
Maas envisioned Celaena Sardothien as a strong and capable heroine, and was inspired by both male and female protagonists.

In an interview prior to the series' debut, Maas discussed the process of creating her protagonist:

I grew up reading books like Robin McKinley's The Hero and the Crown and Garth Nix's Sabriel—both of which feature strong heroines, and both of which profoundly shaped my identity and empowered me. I started writing knowing I wanted to create books like that—mostly because that's what interests me and where my passion lies, but also because I'd love for some young woman to read [Throne of Glass] and feel empowered, too.

The story's teenage heroine, Celaena Sardothien, is introduced as an orphan who was raised and trained by an assassin. She is characterized as skilled, arrogant, and witty. While shaping her protagonist, Maas was inspired by the heroism of Éowyn from The Lord of the Rings, and by the characterization of Velma Kelly from Chicago. Maas has stated that the latter's "arrogance and fierceness made me want to write about a woman like her—about a woman who never once said sorry for being talented and determined and utterly in love with herself."

The author ultimately designed Celaena as a highly capable character whose talents also form a basis for numerous faults. In interviews preceding the series' release, Maas noted her heroine's issues with "impatience" and "vanity". She also suggested that Celaena would grow while adjusting to her new role. In addition to Celaena's skills as an assassin, Maas wanted the character to have several traits and hobbies befitting her age, including a fondness for "shopping, books, and fine dining", as well as a "penchant for getting into trouble."

In creating the friendship between Celaena and Chaol, Maas gave the characters a number of differences. As the story begins, Chaol is introduced as a strict and ethical captain, while Celaena is presented as a morally ambiguous assassin. According to the author, this contrast contributes to Chaol's character development as his bond with Celaena grows. Amidst their experiences, Chaol eventually comes to view her not just as a captive criminal, but also "as a human being." While writing the novel, Maas envisioned Chaol as a character who had "always seen the world in black and white," and concluded that "Celaena just throws a wrench in that."

Prince Dorian is presented as a suitor for Celaena as well. However, their relationship is complicated by his status as the crown prince.

== Release ==
=== Publicity ===
In anticipation of the series' debut, Bloomsbury released e-book editions of four prequel novellas—The Assassin and the Pirate Lord, The Assassin and the Desert, The Assassin and the Underworld, and The Assassin and the Empire—between January and July 2012. Throne of Glass was previewed by Publishers Weekly in February, while the book trailer premiered on MTV.com in May. Additionally, film option rights were acquired by Creative Artists Agency.

=== Reception ===
Throne of Glass has received generally positive reviews, making its debut on the New York Times Best Seller list with the release of the second novel, Crown of Midnight. A review from Publishers Weekly lauded the series' opening as a "strong debut novel." The review went on to state, "This is not cuddly romance, but neither is it grim. Celaena is trained to murder, yet she hasn’t lost her taste for pretty dresses or good books, and a gleam of optimism tinges her outlook. Maas tends toward overdescription, but the verve and freshness of the narration make for a thrilling read." The Guardian gave it 5 stars out of 5 with the author of the review stating that the main character, Celaena, was more "relatable" than most other female protagonists. In her review for USA Today, Serena Chase called Celaena a "next-level Cinderella".

Kirkus stated, "A teenage assassin, a rebel princess, menacing gargoyles, supernatural portals and a glass castle prove to be as thrilling as they sound." With regard to the protagonist, Kirkus noted that "Celaena is still just a teenager trying to forge her way, giving the story timelessness. She might be in the throes of a bloodthirsty competition, but that doesn't mean she's not in turmoil over which tall, dark and handsomely titled man of the royal court should be her boyfriend—and which fancy gown she should wear to a costume party." The review concluded that the story's "commingling of comedy, brutality and fantasy evokes a rich alternate universe with a spitfire young woman as its brightest star."

Throne of Glass was named Amazon.com's "Best Book of the Month for Kids & Teens" in August 2012. Whitney Kate Sullivan of Romantic Times stated that "Maas' YA fantasy world is one of the most compelling that this reviewer has visited all year. The assassin heroine's growth and the multilayered secondary characters are amazing." Serena Chase of USA Today applauded the story's love triangle, and noted that "Maas excels at world building, spicing up this unusual take on the Cinderella story by injecting myths, fairy tales and religious traditions with the magic of a fresh and faulted world. Whereas many authors rely on geographic detail to build their worlds, Maas' environment is more politically driven and her characterizations are deftly drawn to support that sort of structure." Chase also commended Maas for creating "a truly remarkable heroine who doesn't sacrifice the grit that makes her real in order to do what's right in the end."

In 2024, Empire of Storms was one of 13 books banned from all Utah public schools by the state school board for allegedly containing "objective sensitive material." Five other books by Maas, all in the A Court of Thorns and Roses series, were also among the banned books.

== Accolades and nominations ==
Year-end lists
Year	Publication	Work	Category	Result	Ref
2015	BuzzFeed	Queen of Shadows	16 Of The Best YA Books Of 2015	11	
2015	The Independent	Queen of Shadows	10 best fantasy novels	4	
2013	PopSugar	Crown of Midnight	The Best YA Books of 2013	2	
2015	PopSugar	Queen of Shadows	The Best YA Books of 2015	8	
2016	PopSugar	Empire of Storms	The Best YA Books of 2016	20	

Work	Year & Award	Category	Result	Ref.
Throne of Glass	2012 Goodreads Choice Awards	Young Adult Fantasy & Science Fiction	Nominated	
Throne of Glass	2013 Waterstones Children's Book Prize	Teen	Finalist	
Throne of Glass	2014 Arkansas Teen Book Award		Nominated	
Throne of Glass	2014-2015 South Dakota Library Association	SD Teen Choice Book Awards	MS Honor	
Throne of Glass	2015-2016 Soaring Eagle Book Award		1st Runner-up	

== Television adaptation ==
In September 2016, it was announced that the Throne of Glass series had been opted for a television adaptation by Hulu and Disney-ABC Domestic Television. The series was set to be titled Queen of Shadows, named after the fifth novel in the series, with The Mark Gordon Company serving as the main project studio. The adaptation was to be written by Kira Snyder, who also wrote The 100, with the pilot potentially to be directed by Anna Foerster.
