= Sarah J. Maas =

American fantasy author (born 1986)

- Born: Sarah Janet Maas; March 5, 1986 (age 40); New York City, U.S.
- Education: Hamilton College (BA)
- Occupation: Author
- Notable work: Throne of Glass; A Court of Thorns and Roses; Crescent City
- Spouse: Josh Wasserman (m. 2010)
- Children: 2
- Website: sarahjmaas.com

Sarah Janet Maas (/mæs/ mass; born March 5, 1986) is an American fantasy writer known for her series Throne of Glass, A Court of Thorns and Roses, and Crescent City. As of 2024, she has sold more than 75 million copies of her books and her work has been translated into 40 languages.

== Early life ==
Maas was born on March 5, 1986, in New York City. She was adopted by a Catholic mother and a Jewish father, and they lived on the Upper West Side of Manhattan. Maas grew up Jewish.

Maas graduated magna cum laude from Hamilton College in 2008 with a degree in creative writing and a minor in religious studies.

== Career ==
Maas began writing what would become her debut novel, Throne of Glass, at age sixteen. She posted several chapters of the novel then titled Queen of Glass on FictionPress.com, where it became one of the most popular stories on the site. It was later removed from the site when she decided to publish the novel. The story line of the series is based on the story of Cinderella, with the premise of "What if Cinderella was not a servant, but an assassin? ... what if she didn't attend the ball to meet the prince, but to kill him, instead?"

In 2008, Maas sent the novel to agents before signing with Tamar Rydzinski of The Laura Dail Literary Agency in 2009. Throne of Glass was purchased in March 2010 by Bloomsbury Publishing, who later purchased two additional books in the series. The series is available in 15 countries and 35 languages. Five prequel novellas set two years before the first novel were published and later condensed into a book, The Assassin's Blade as well as an original novella. The second book of the series, Crown of Midnight was a New York Times young adult best-seller. The final book in the series, Kingdom of Ash, was released on October 23, 2018; the finished series comprised seven books plus the novella collection. A Court of Thorns and Roses, Maas's second fantasy series, is a loose retelling of "Beauty and the Beast". The first book of the series was written in 2009, but was not published until 2015. Due to the success and popularity of the original series, it was extended, and a spin-off series was announced, featuring stories of other popular characters. The fifth book in the series and the first of the spin-offs, A Court of Silver Flames, was published on February 16, 2021. The series was optioned for a television adaptation in 2021 by Hulu, but as of February 2024, the television series is no longer in active development.

On May 16, 2018, Maas announced her third adult fantasy series, Crescent City. The first book, titled House of Earth and Blood, was released by Bloomsbury on March 3, 2020. It was ranked one of the top twenty Science Fiction & Fantasy books of 2020 on Kobo. The sequel, House of Sky and Breath, was released on February 15, 2022 and won the Best Fantasy award for Goodreads Choice Awards in 2022. The third installation of the series, House of Flame and Shadow, was released on January 30, 2024.

== Critical and commercial reception ==
Maas's character development, particularly of morally-gray characters, has been lauded as one of her best qualities; her creation of detailed imaginary worlds has also seen praise. The Independent compared Maas's success to that of J. K. Rowling, noting their shared ability to inspire passionate fans, drive huge numbers of book-sales, and create complex worlds with complicated caste-systems. It also noted how Maas "was ahead of the game when it came to the rising appetite for empowering female heroines", acknowledging that her books "are notable for a [unique] defining factor: Female agency".

Vox has described Maas as Romantasy's "reigning queen", praising both her writing for being "pleasingly familiar, with a gentle touch of surprise", and her deftness in working homages and references to classic Fantasy-works into her worldbuilding.

In August 2024, the Utah State Board of Education announced six of Maas's books could not be held in libraries or classrooms at public schools or charter schools due a new state law against material deemed sensitive, pornographic, or obscene. The law requires questioned books to be "disposed" and not sold or donated. Critics characterized this action as a "book-ban". The law does not prohibit the sale of any books in the state, nor restrict books at municipal or university libraries.

== Influences and style ==
Maas attributed her love of reading and writing fantasy to Garth Nix's novel Sabriel and Robin McKinley's The Hero and the Crown. She has also named movie scores, classical music, Buffy the Vampire Slayer, and Sailor Moon as influences.

In 2020, Maas said, "The sense of discovery is why I love writing so much. It's a total thrill for me." Her books are known for their themes of romance, and Maas noted that she was surprised A Court of Thorns and Roses had been classified as young adult.

In October 2026, Sarah J. Maas's novel A Court of Splintered Harmony set a UK sales record, becoming the fastest-selling adult fantasy novel since records began in 1998. It sold 188,914 copies in its first five days and reached the top of the UK book chart.

== Controversy ==
Maas's books have received criticism for poor handling of racial and LGBTQ+ diversity by some. Racial diversity has been criticized as being physical only, with no cultural diversity involved. Additionally, the one exception has been criticized for thinly veiled ties to Middle Eastern cultures and is described in the novels as "brutal" and "backward".

A Court of Thorns and Roses has been cited for criticism on LGBTQ+ diversity. The four LGBTQ+ characters' sexualities were all revealed in the third book, which was supposed to be the conclusion of the series. The reveals were criticized for making one of the characters a stereotype while another was forced to reveal herself as a lesbian while also maintaining an established heterosexual subplot.

On September 24, 2020, Maas revealed the cover of A Court of Silver Flames, the fourth book in the series A Court of Thorns and Roses. This received backlash due to the fact that in the same post Maas drew attention to the killing of Breonna Taylor. This was 9 days after the Louisville Metro Government settled with Taylor's family in a civil lawsuit. The post included only a photo of the book and lacked any images of Taylor. Some saw this as an attempt to promote her book through the event, while others saw it as drawing attention to the event using her platform. By March 2026, the post had been removed after numerous and continuous requests for it to be taken down.

== Personal life ==
While a freshman at Hamilton, Maas met Josh Wasserman, who was a resident assistant in her dorm building. The couple got married on May 30, 2010.

Maas and Wasserman have two children, a son born in 2018 and a daughter born in 2022. They live in New York City.

== Recognition ==
=== Awards and nominations ===
Work	Year & Award	Category	Result	Ref.
Throne of Glass	2012 Goodreads Choice Awards	Young Adult Fantasy & Science Fiction	Nominated	
Throne of Glass	2013 Waterstones Children's Book Prize	Teen	Finalist	
Throne of Glass	2014 Arkansas Teen Book Award		Nominated	
Throne of Glass	2014-2015 South Dakota Library Association	SD Teen Choice Book Awards	MS Honor	
Throne of Glass	2015-2016 Soaring Eagle Book Award		1st Runner-up	
Crown of Midnight	2013 Goodreads Choice Awards	Young Adult Fantasy & Science Fiction	Nominated	
Heir of Fire	2014 Goodreads Choice Awards	Young Adult Fantasy	Nominated	
Queen of Shadows	2015 Goodreads Choice Awards	Young Adult Fantasy & Science Fiction	Won	
Queen of Shadows	2018 Goodreads Choice Awards	Best of the Best	Nominated	
A Court of Thorns and Roses	2015 Goodreads Choice Awards	Young Adult Fantasy & Science Fiction	Nominated	
A Court of Thorns and Roses	2016 Kids’ Book Choice Awards	Teen Book of the Year	Finalist	
A Court of Thorns and Roses	2017 Arkansas Teen Book Award	Grades 10-12	Won	
A Court of Mist and Fury	2016 Goodreads Choice Awards	Young Adult Fantasy & Science Fiction	Won	
A Court of Mist and Fury	2017 Kids’ Book Choice Awards	Teen Book of the Year	Finalist	
A Court of Mist and Fury	2018 Goodreads Choice Awards	Best of the Best	Nominated	
Empire of Storms	2016 Goodreads Choice Awards	Young Adult Fantasy & Science Fiction	Nominated	
A Court of Wings and Ruin	2017 Dragon Awards	Young Adult Novel	Nominated	
A Court of Wings and Ruin	2017 Romantic Times Reviewers’ Choice Awards	Young Adult Fantasy	Nominated	
A Court of Wings and Ruin	2017 Goodreads Choice Awards	Young Adult Fantasy & Science Fiction	Won	
A Court of Wings and Ruin	2018 Goodreads Choice Awards	Best of the Best	Nominated	
Tower of Dawn	2017 Goodreads Choice Awards	Young Adult Fantasy & Science Fiction	Nominated	
Kingdom of Ash	2018 Goodreads Choice Awards	Young Adult Fantasy & Science Fiction	Won	
A Court of Frost and Starlight	2018 Dragon Awards	Young Adult/Middle Grade	Nominated	
A Court of Frost and Starlight	2018 Goodreads Choice Awards	Young Adult Fantasy & Science Fiction	Nominated	
House of Earth and Blood	2020 Goodreads Choice Awards	Fantasy	Won	
A Court of Silver Flames	2021 Goodreads Choice Awards	Fantasy	Won	
House of Sky and Breath	2022 Goodreads Choice Awards	Fantasy	Won	
House of Flame and Shadow	2024 Goodreads Choice Awards	Romantasy	Won	
House of Flame and Shadow	2025 Libby Book Awards	Romantasy	Won	

=== Year-end lists ===
Year	Publication	Work	Category	Result	Ref
2021	Book Riot	A Court of Silver Flames	Top Books of 2021	—N/a	
2015	Bustle	A Court of Thorns and Roses	The 25 Best YA Books Of 2015	9	
2015	BuzzFeed	Queen of Shadows	16 Of The Best YA Books Of 2015	11	
2015	BuzzFeed	A Court of Thorns and Roses	The 32 Best Fantasy Books Of 2015	7	
2018	BuzzFeed	A Court of Wings and Ruins	28 Of The Best YA Books Released in 2017	9	
2018	Cosmopolitan	A Court of Frost and Starlight	The 71 Best Books of 2018	33	
2021	Business Insider	A Court of Thorns and Roses Series	The 23 best fantasy book series to read right now	—N/a	
2021	Business Insider	A Court of Thorns and Roses	The 21 best young adult romance books to read in 2021	—N/a	
2015	The Independent	Queen of Shadows	10 best fantasy novels	4	
2020	Kobo	House of Earth and Blood	Our top 20 Science Fiction & Fantasy picks of 2020	—N/a	
2021	Kobo	A Court of Silver Flames	Best audiobooks of 2021	—N/a	
2021	Kobo	A Court of Silver Flames	Our top 20 Science Fiction & Fantasy picks of 2021	—N/a	
2013	PopSugar	Crown of Midnight	The Best YA Books of 2013	2	
2015	PopSugar	Queen of Shadows	10 Best Young Adult Books of 2015	8	
2015	PopSugar	A Court of Thorns and Roses	10 Best Young Adult Books of 2015	22	
2016	PopSugar	A Court of Mist and Fury	The Best YA Books of 2016	13	
2016	PopSugar	Empire of Storms	The Best YA Books of 2016	20	
2017	PopSugar	A Court of Wings and Ruin	The Best YA Romance Books of 2017	11	
2021	PopSugar	A Court of Silver Flames	A Running List of the Best Books of 2021, For All Your TBR Needs	38	
2021	Wired	A Court of Thorns and Roses	36 of the best fantasy books everyone should read	—N/a	
2024	Publishers Weekly	A Court of Thorns and Roses	Top 25 list of bestsellers for 2023	#11	

=== Decade-end lists ===
Year	Publication	Work	Category	Result	Ref
2019	BuzzFeed	Throne of Glass	The 30 Best YA Books of the Decade	10	
2019	Comic Years	Throne of Glass series	The Top 10 Fantasy Series Published in the Past Decade	10	
2019	Cultured Vulture	Throne of Glass	Books of the Decade: 10 Best YA Books of the 2010s	5	
2019	The Young Folks	Throne of Glass	The 25 Best Young Adult Books of the 2010s	9	
2019	The Young Folks	A Court of Thorns and Roses	The 25 Best Young Adult Books of the 2010s	8	
2019	The Young Folks	A Court of Frost and Starlight	10 Best Holiday YA Novels of the 2010s	—N/a	

== Published works ==
=== Throne of Glass ===
#	Released	Title	Ref
0.1	2014	The Assassin's Blade	
1	2012	Throne of Glass	
2	2013	Crown of Midnight	
3	2014	Heir of Fire	
4	2015	Queen of Shadows	
5	2016	Empire of Storms	
6	2017	Tower of Dawn	
7	2018	Kingdom of Ash	

==== Companions ====
- Throne of Glass Coloring Book (2016)

=== A Court of Thorns and Roses ===
#	Released	Title	Ref
1	2015	A Court of Thorns and Roses	
2	2016	A Court of Mist and Fury	
3	2017	A Court of Wings and Ruin	
4	2018	A Court of Frost and Starlight	
5	2021	A Court of Silver Flames	
6	2026	A Court of Splintered Harmony	
7	2027	A Court of Forgotten Melody	

==== Companions ====
- A Court of Thorns and Roses Coloring Book (2017)

=== Crescent City ===
#	Released	Title	Ref
1	2020	House of Earth and Blood	
2	2022	House of Sky and Breath	
3	2024	House of Flame and Shadow	

=== Others ===
- Catwoman: Soulstealer (2018)
