= A Court of Thorns and Roses =

Book series by Sarah J. Maas

- A Court of Thorns and Roses (2015); A Court of Mist and Fury (2016); A Court of Wings and Ruin (2017); A Court of Frost and Starlight (2018); A Court of Silver Flames (2021); A Court of Splintered Harmony (2026)
- Author: Sarah J. Maas
- Country: United States
- Language: English
- Genre: Romance, fantasy
- Publisher: Bloomsbury Publishing
- Published: May 5, 2015 – present
- Media type: Print

A Court of Thorns and Roses is a romantic fantasy series of novels by American author Sarah J. Maas, which follows the journey of 19-year-old Feyre Archeron after she is brought into the faerie lands of Prythian. The first book of the series, A Court of Thorns and Roses, was published in May 2015. The series centers on Feyre's adventures across Prythian and the faerie courts, following the epic love story and fierce struggle that ensues after she enters the fae lands. The series has sold over 13 million copies. The most recent novel was released on October 27, 2026, bringing the series to a total of six novels with the seventh to be released on January 12, 2027. An eighth installment is set to conclude the continuous story told across books six, seven and eight.

The series is a New York Times Best Seller and had been optioned by Hulu for a television series adaptation by Ronald D. Moore. Variety magazine reported in 2024 that the project was still in development at Hulu, but faced an uncertain future. In 2025, the television series was officially scrapped.

== Books ==
=== Main ===
No.	Title	Publication date	Counts	ISBN
1	A Court of Thorns and Roses	May 5, 2015	130,423 words / 432 pages	9781619634442
Nineteen-year-old Feyre Archeron is taken to the land of the faerie, Prythian, by her captor, Tamlin, who is an immortal faerie and the High Lord of the Spring Court. Living with Tamlin, Feyre realizes that what she has previously learnt about the dangerous faerie world is false and that an evil force, led by Amarantha has cursed the lands and taken away the power of the High Lords. Feyre travels to her domain and undergoes three trials aided by Rhysand, the High Lord of the Night Court. After succeeding, Feyre is killed by Amarantha, but is resurrected into a High Fae by all the High Lords. Tamlin kills Amarantha and Feyre returns to the Spring Court with him.
2	A Court of Mist and Fury	May 3, 2016	186,220 words / 640 pages	9781619634466
Feyre becomes increasingly unhappy at the Spring Court with Tamlin and is saved by Rhysand, High Lord of the Night Court, on her wedding day. She begins healing and learning to control her emerging powers with Rhysand and meets his Inner Circle in the secret city of Velaris, protected from the outside world. Feyre learns that the King of Hybern plans to use the Cauldron to remove the wall between the faerie and human worlds, and she allies with Rhysand and his Inner Circle to acquire the Book of Breathings, which could counteract the Cauldron. Feyre also learns that she and Rhysand are mates. After Hybern attacks Velaris, the group attempts to stop the king, but he captures Feyre's sisters and transforms them into High Fae. Feyre helps Rhysand and the group escape while returning to the Spring Court to act as a spy.
3	A Court of Wings and Ruin	May 2, 2017	199,464 words / 720 pages	9781619634480
Feyre returns to the Spring Court to spy on Tamlin and the King of Hybern and turn his forces against him. After Feyre escapes back to the Night Court with Lucien, the High Lords meet with other allies to forge a united front against the King of Hybern. War breaks out, and the King of Hybern attempts to use the Cauldron to destroy the barrier and kills Feyre's father. Elain, Feyre's sister, kills the King, and Rhysand sacrifices himself to restore the Cauldron. The High Lords pool their power to resurrect Rhysand, and with the war over, they work towards healing Prythian and establishing a treaty.
4	A Court of Frost and Starlight	May 1, 2018	57,763 words / 240 pages	9781635575613
Months after the war for Prythian has ended, Feyre, Rhysand, and their friends rebuild the Night Court after the attack from Hybern. Winter Solstice is approaching, and the court prepares for the festive season. As Feyre continues adapting to her role as High Lady of the Night Court, she must navigate around the scars that the war has inflicted upon them all.
5	A Court of Silver Flames	February 16, 2021	210,289 words / 768 pages	9781681196282
After being forced to become High Fae, Nesta, one of Feyre’s two sisters, struggles to find her place in the Night Court, following the tragic war that has left her and her powers lost and confused. Meanwhile, Cassian, General of the Night Court, adjusts to the new life that constantly puts him in Nesta’s presence. Together, to defeat new evils, they must confront their past, present, and wavering future.
6	A Court of Splintered Harmony	October 27, 2026	352 pages	9781639739134
7	A Court of Forgotten Melody	January 12, 2027	896 pages	9798260200568
8	TBA	TBA	TBA	

=== Companions ===
- A Court of Thorns and Roses Coloring Book (2017)

== Development ==
Maas initially intended the series as a retelling of the fairy tales Beauty and the Beast, East of the Sun and West of the Moon, and Tam Lin. These tales inspired the finished series, though it was not ultimately a dedicated retelling.

She began writing A Court of Thorns and Roses in early 2009, with the first draft taking about five weeks to complete.

A Court of Mist and Fury's first draft was written entirely in a split point of view between Feyre and Rhysand. The second book went through multiple name changes, including A Court of Wind and Stone, A Court of Calm and Fury, A Court of Stars and Smoke, A Court of Wings and Stars, A Court of Venom and Silver and A Court of Stars and Frost. Like the first novel, the second is based upon multiple fairy tales and myths, including Hades and Persephone, with the Greek mythology-inspired characters such as Rhysand and Feyre and their home in the Night Court. Other fairy tale inspirations include Hansel and Gretel, which spawned the character of the Weaver, and the Book of Exodus, which loosely inspired parts of the backstory for Miryam and Drakon.

The final cover of A Court of Wings and Ruin was designed by Adrian Dadich, with the dress pictured on the cover originally designed by Charlie Bowater and later adapted by Dadich.

On July 12, 2016, Entertainment Weekly reported that Maas was writing five new books for the series, that would include two novellas and three further novels which would be set before and after the first trilogy.

In 2020, the series was reprinted and published by Bloomsbury with new illustrated covers. A Court of Thorns and Roses has existed between the Young Adult and New Adult fiction categories since the publication of the first book. At the time A Court of Thorns and Roses was published, the New Adult categorization had not caught on the way publishers hoped it would. Maas agreed to publish the book as YA so long as her editor did not censor any of the sexual content. The A Court of Thorns and Roses series is now classified as New Adult.

In September 2023, Maas publicly discussed writing a sixth book for the series. On July 11, 2025, a post on Maas' Instagram account indicated she has completed the first draft. In March 2026, Sarah J. Maas confirmed on the Call Her Daddy podcast that the sixth through eighth books would be "a book told in four parts". The sixth book is set to be released on October 27, 2026, and the seventh book on January 12, 2027. The eighth book is yet to be written and has no release date attached.

== Reception ==
=== Awards and nominations ===
Year	Award	Category	Book	Result	Ref
2017	Dragon Awards	Best Young Adult / Middle Grade Novel	A Court of Wings and Ruin	Nominated	
2015	Goodreads Choice Awards	Best Young Adult Fantasy and Science Fiction	A Court of Thorns and Roses	Nominated	
2016	Goodreads Choice Awards	Best Young Adult Fantasy and Science Fiction	A Court of Mist and Fury	Won	
2017	Goodreads Choice Awards	Best Young Adult Fantasy and Science Fiction	A Court of Wings and Ruin	Won	
2018	Goodreads Choice Awards	Best Young Adult Fantasy and Science Fiction	A Court of Frost and Starlight	Nominated	
2018	Goodreads Choice Awards	Best of the Best	A Court of Mist and Fury	Nominated	
2018	Goodreads Choice Awards	Best of the Best	A Court of Wings and Ruin	Nominated	
2021	Goodreads Choice Awards	Best Fantasy & Science Fiction	A Court of Silver Flames	Won	

=== Accolades ===
Year-end lists
Year	Publication	Work	Category	Result	Ref
2015	Bustle	A Court of Thorns and Roses	The 25 Best YA Books Of 2015	9	
2015	BuzzFeed	A Court of Thorns and Roses	The 32 Best Fantasy Books Of 2015	7	
2018	BuzzFeed	A Court of Wings and Ruins	28 Of The Best YA Books Released In 2017	9	
2018	Cosmopolitan	A Court of Frost and Starlight	The 71 Best Books of 2018	33	
2021	Business Insider	"A Court of Thorns and Roses" Series	The 23 best fantasy book series to read right now	—N/a	
2021	Business Insider	A Court of Thorns and Roses	The 21 best young adult romance books to read in 2021	—N/a	
2015	PopSugar	A Court of Thorns and Roses	The Best YA Books of 2015	22	
2016	PopSugar	A Court of Mist and Fury	The Best YA Books of 2016	13	
2017	PopSugar	A Court of Wings and Ruin	The Best YA Romance Books of 2017	11	
2021	Wired	A Court of Thorns and Roses	36 of the best fantasy books everyone should read	—N/a	

=== Censorship in the United States ===
In 2022, according to the American Library Association's Office of Intellectual Freedom, A Court of Mist and Fury was tied for the tenth-most banned and challenged book in the United States. In 2023 a school district in Mason City, Iowa, made international news when they banned the book from library shelves after running a list of books through ChatGPT and asking it if the books, "contain a description or depiction of a sex act."

In 2023, the Central Media Advisory Committee for Charlotte-Mecklenburg Schools in North Carolina voted to ban A Court of Frost and Starlight, the fourth installment in the series. The committee declares responsibility for the "review and removal of books" as a result of material that is "educationally unsuitable, pervasively vulgar or obscene, or inappropriate to the age, maturity or grade level of students." The book is still accessible online, but students can be denied access due to parental controls.

In February 2024, individuals in the Rutherford County Schools (RCS) library system in Tennessee were "...quietly instructed by higher ups to remove 20 books from all RCS library shelves", with the entirety of this five-book series being included among those twenty selections; an internal review by RCS determined that two of those twenty titles did not meet the standard for obscenity as defined by Tennessee state law and were accordingly allowed to remain upon school shelves. The removal of the eighteen remaining books occurred without seeking input from librarians and without due process policy for the school system being applied; as of mid-March 2024, all of those eighteen books (still including this entire series) remain off RCS shelves. The Rutherford County Library Alliance, a nonprofit organization whose mission statement defines them as being "...dedicated to safeguarding the principles of intellectual freedom and unrestricted access to information within the public library system of Rutherford County, Tennessee", is in the process of challenging this censorship.

In 2024, all five books in the series were among 13 banned from all Utah public schools by the state school board for containing "objective sensitive material." One additional Maas book, Empire of Storms, was also banned.

In 2025, the American Library Association reported that A Court of Thorns and Roses had the 7th highest count of requests by people or political groups for removal from libraries in the USA that year.

== Adaptations ==
A Court of Thorns and Roses was optioned by Jo Bamford's and Piers Tempest's Tempo Productions in November 2015. The producers revealed in 2018 they had hired Rachel Hirons to work as the movie's screenwriter.

In March 2021, it was announced that A Court of Thorns and Roses series had been opted for a television adaptation by 20th Television for Hulu. The series was set to be developed by Ronald D. Moore alongside Maas. In an interview with The New York Times, Maas confirmed that she was developing the project with the writers and the showrunner as the executive producer of the adaptation. As of December 2023, no cast had been set, but writing for the script had continued for the adaptation. In February 2024, it was announced by TVLine that the adaptation had been scrapped and would not be shopped to other networks; however, Variety reported that these reports were inaccurate. In February 2025, the adaptation was officially scrapped.

== Other media ==
A A Court of Thorns and Roses version of the board game Monopoly was released on October 1, 2026. Two different editions were made available: a standard edition, and a special edition including an extra collectible token sold exclusively through Amazon.
