= List of fictional princes =

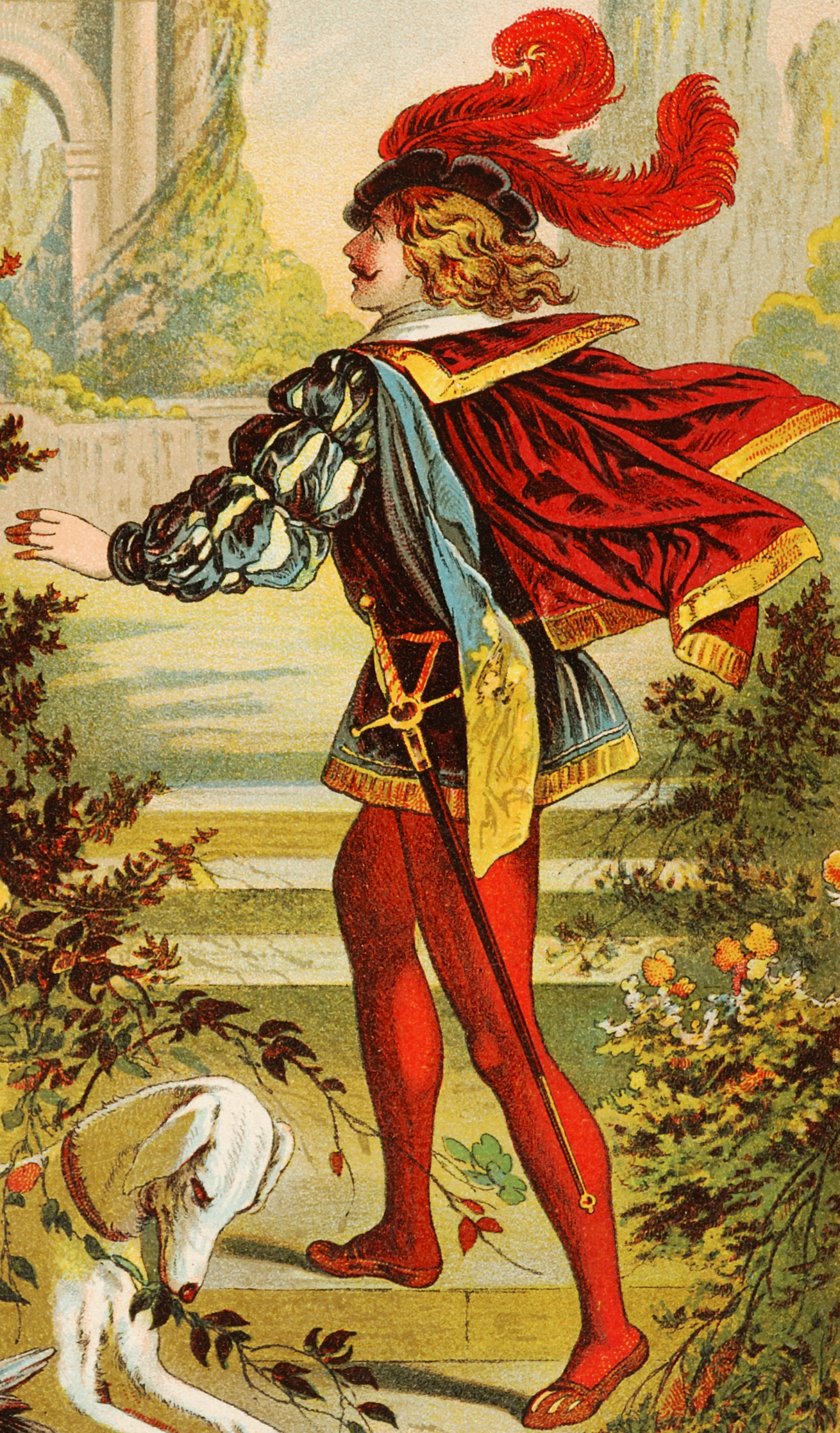
Prince Charming of "Sleeping Beauty", a print drawing from the late-19th-century book Mein erstes Märchenbuch, published in Stuttgart, Germany

This is a list of fictional princes that have appeared in various works of fiction. It is organized by medium and limited to well-referenced, notable examples of the fictional princes.

== Literature ==
This section contains examples of both classic and more modern writing.

| Fictional prince(s) | Work | Notes | Author |
|---|---|---|---|
| Ivan Tsarevich | Tsarevitch Ivan, the Fire Bird and the Gray Wolf; The Frog Princess; The Sea King and Vasilisa the Wise; The Bold Knight, the Apples of Youth, and the Water of Life; The Wicked Sisters; The Death of Koschei the Deathless | One of the main protagonists of the Russian folktales collected by Alexander Afanasyev in Narodnye russkie skazki. | Alexander Afanasyev |
| Ring | Prince Ring | Icelandic fairy tale included by Andrew Lang in The Yellow Fairy Book. | Jón Árnason |
| Prince Lír | The Last Unicorn | He is a skilled hero who was adopted by King Haggard, found in the town of Hagsgate. | Peter S. Beagle |
| Michel Ard Rhi | Magic Kingdom of Landover | He was formerly the prince of Landover who was so cruel that his kingdom banished him, long before he became a Washington state millionaire. Michel appears in the third novel Wizard at Large. | Terry Brooks |
| Ivor Fedorovitch | The Lost Prince | He was the lost prince of Samavia who vanished during the Middle Ages. | Frances Hodgson Burnett |
| Carthoris | Barsoom series | He is the prince of Helium who is part red Martian and part Earthman. His name is a combaination of his parents John Carter and Princess Dejah Thoris. | Edgar Rice Burroughs |
| Gahan | Barsoom series | He is the prince from Gathol who marries Carthoris's sister Princess Tara. | Edgar Rice Burroughs |
| John Carter of Mars | Barsoom series | He marries Princess Dejah Thoris of Helium. In The Warlord of Mars, John is known as the Warlord of Barsoom. | Edgar Rice Burroughs |
| Ian | How Ian Direach got the Blue Falcon | Scottish fairy tale collected by John Francis Campbell in Popular Tales of the West Highlands and included by Andrew Lang in The Orange Fairy Book. | John Francis Campbell |
| Snake Prince | The Snake Prince | The Indian fairy tale collected by Major Campbell in Firozpur; included by Andrew Lang in The Olive Fairy Book. | Major Campbell |
| Prince Maxon Calix Schreave | The Selection series | The son and heir of King Clarkson and Queen Amberly Schreave of Illéa. | Kiera Cass |
| Prince Paul | The King of Clubs | The prince of Maurania. | Agatha Christie |
| Prince of Erin | The Thirteenth Son of the King of Erin | He is the youngest of the King's thirteen sons, in the Irish fairy tale collected by Jeremiah Curtin in Myths and Folk-lore of Ireland and included by Ruth Manning-Sanders in A Book of Dragons. | Jeremiah Curtin |
| Furibon | Le Prince Lutin | He was a malformed prince whose rival governor had claimed to his throne. | Madame d'Aulnoy |
| Léandre | Le Prince Lutin | He was originally a handsome human prince but has been turned into a lutin. | Madame d'Aulnoy |
| Prince Chéri | Princess Belle-Etoile | French fairy tale inspired by Giovanni Francesco Straparola's Ancilotto, King of Provino. | Madame d'Aulnoy |
| Prince Pondicherry | Charlie and the Chocolate Factory | He is the reigning Indian prince who could rule in his chocolate palace, despite Willy Wonka's warning, until it melts in the hot weather. | Roald Dahl |
| Prince Edward Plantagenet | Dragon Knight | The prince of England who was being held captive by a rogue magickian Malvinne and later identified as the historical "Black Prince"; the son of King Edward III Plantagenet. | Gordon R. Dickson |
| Prince Karl "Charles" von Waldron | The Fall of a Nation | | Thomas Dixon, Jr. |
| Prince Myshkin | The Idiot | Prince Lev Nikolayevich Myshkin | Fyodor Dostoevsky |
| Kheldar | The Belgariad series | Also known as Silk, he is the prince of Drasnia as well as a spy and thief; the nephew of King Rhodar and Queen Porenn. He first appears in Pawn of Prophecy. | David Eddings |
| Kheva | The Belgariad series | The crown prince of Drasnia, the younger cousin of Kheldar and the son of King Rhodar and Queen Porenn. He ascended the throne upon his father's death. | David Eddings |
| Prince La Fireez | The Worm Ouroboros | The reigning prince of Pixyland and the brother of Lady Prezmyra. He died in the naval battle. | E. R. Eddison |
| Prince John | Robin Hood legends | The villainous prince of England who is assisted by the Sheriff of Nottingham and Sir Guy of Gisbourne, loosely based on the historical John, King of England. | English folklore |
| Prince of Aragon | Robin Hood and the Prince of Aragon | | English folklore |
| Horace Altman | Ranger's Apprentice | He is the knight and former captain of Royal Guard Unit B of the kingdom of Araluen who is married to its crown princess Cassandra as her prince consort. Also of note is his father-in-law, King Duncan, who was formerly the prince of Araluen during his youthhood. | John Flanagan |
| Prince Ahmed | Prince Ahmad and the Fairy Peri-Banu | A Middle Eastern folktale; one of a collection of tales from The Book of One Thousand and One Nights (Arabian Nights). | Translated and added by Antoine Galland |
| Prince Ali | Prince Ahmad and the Fairy Peri-Banu | A Middle Eastern folktale; one of a collection of tales from The Book of One Thousand and One Nights (Arabian Nights). | Translated and added by Antoine Galland |
| Prince Hussain | Prince Ahmad and the Fairy Peri-Banu | A Middle Eastern folktale; one of a collection of tales from The Book of One Thousand and One Nights (Arabian Nights). | Translated and added by Antoine Galland |
| Aladdin | The Story of Aladdin; or, the Wonderful Lamp | Aladdin is a humble young man who wishes to become a wealthy prince to be married to Princess Badroulbadour. | Translated and added by Antoine Galland |
| Prince Humperdinck | The Princess Bride | He is the heir to the throne of Florin who wants the most beautiful woman to be his bride. The son of the elderly King Lotharon and the stepson of Queen Bella. | William Goldman |
| Prince Fyren | The Sword of Truth | The High Prince of Kelton. | Terry Goodkind |
| Prince Harold Amnell | The Sword of Truth | The prince and the leader of the armies of Galea; the son of King Wyborn and Queen Bernadine Amnell and the brother of Queen Cyrilla Amnell. | Terry Goodkind |
| Prince Charming | Cinderella | | Brothers Grimm and Charles Perrault |
| Prince Bertie | King & King | A young gay prince whose mother the grouchy queen forces him to marry a princess, but he is actually in love with another prince named Lee. Both Bertie and Lee later become kings when they marry each other. | Linda de Haan and Stern Nijland |
| Prince George | The Princess and the Hound | | Mette Ivie Harrison |
| Farad'n | Dune | The son of Princess Wensicia and Dalak and the grandson of the 81st Padishah Emperor Shaddam Corrino IV and Anirul. | Frank Herbert |
| Prince Casamassima | Roderick Hudson | The rich Neapolitan. | Henry James |
| Five Princes | The Tale of the Bamboo Cutter | They are the five princes who have been telling Kaguya-hime (the Princess Kaguya) to choose from among them for her hand in marriage but fail on her, in a 10th-century Japanese folktale. This story is also the basis for the science fiction manga series Kaguyahime. | Japanese folklore |
| Köke Temür | The Heaven Sword and Dragon Saber | The son of Prince Chaghan Temür of Ruyang of the Yuan Dynasty and the older brother of Zhao Min. | Jin Yong |
| Zhang Wuji | The Heaven Sword and Dragon Saber | He is married to Zhao Min. | Jin Yong |
| Caspian X | The Chronicles of Narnia | The former prince, and now king, of Narnia. | C. S. Lewis |
| Prince Cor (aka Shasta) | The Chronicles of Narnia | The prince and rightful heir of Archenland, the son of King Lune and the older twin brother of Prince Corin. | C. S. Lewis |
| Rabadash | The Chronicles of Narnia | The prince and heir to the throne of Calormen, son of the Tisroc, who attempts to take over Archenland but has been thwarted by Prince Cor and turned into a donkey by Aslan. | C. S. Lewis |
| Rilian | The Chronicles of Narnia | The prince, and later king, of Narnia and the son of King Caspian X. | C. S. Lewis |
| Dorian Havilliard | Throne of Glass series | The Crown Prince, and later King, of Adarlan and one of the main characters of the novel series. | Sarah J. Maas |
| Prince Harelip | The Princess and the Goblin | The Goblin prince. | George MacDonald |
| Prince Tung | Thank You, Mr. Moto | He is descended from an old Manchu family; a friend of Tom Nelson. | John P. Marquand |
| Joffrey Baratheon | A Song of Ice and Fire | He was formerly the Crown Prince of the Seven Kingdoms, legal son of King Robert Baratheon and biological son of Cersei and Jaime Lannister; older brother of Tommen and Myrcella Baratheon. He becomes the king of the Seven Kingdoms after his legal father's death. | George R. R. Martin |
| Tommen Baratheon | A Song of Ice and Fire | He is the younger brother of Joffrey and Myrcella Baratheon and the husband of Margaery Tyrell. | George R. R. Martin |
| Theon Greyjoy | A Song of Ice and Fire | He is the son of King Balon Greyjoy of the Iron Islands. | George R. R. Martin |
| Doran Martell | A Song of Ice and Fire | He is the Prince of Dorne and Lord of Sunspear. | George R. R. Martin |
| Quentyn Martell | A Song of Ice and Fire | He is the second child and firstborn son of Prince Doran Martell. | George R. R. Martin |
| Trystane Martell | A Song of Ice and Fire | He is the youngest child of Prince Doran Martell. | George R. R. Martin |
| Oberyn Martell | A Song of Ice and Fire | Better known as the Red Viper, he is the younger brother of Prince Doran and Princess Elia Martell. | George R. R. Martin |
| Prince Azim | The Drum | | A. E. W. Mason |
| Prince Guhl | The Drum | The main antagonist of the story. | A. E. W. Mason |
| Prince Kaito "Kai" | The Lunar Chronicles series | He is formerly the crown prince, and now emperor, of the Eastern Commonwealth; the son of the late Emperor Rikan. He is based on Prince Charming from "Cinderella". | Marissa Meyer |
| Earnest | The Princes and the Treasure | The two gay men who become princes as they marry each other in the end. | Jeffrey A. Miles |
| Gallant | The Princes and the Treasure | The two gay men who become princes as they marry each other in the end. | Jeffrey A. Miles |
| Prince Dolor | The Little Lame Prince and his Travelling Cloak | | Miss Mulock |
| Prince Ronald | The Paper Bag Princess | Illustrated by Michael Martchenko. | Robert Munsch |
| Russian Prince | The Emperor's Candlesticks | The kidnapped prince from Russia. | Baroness Orczy |
| Prince Xizor | Star Wars: Shadows of the Empire | | Steve Perry |
| Aphai and Sisuwan | Phra Aphai Mani | The Thai princes. | Sunthorn Phu |
| Prince Jonathan of Conté | The Song of the Lioness | The crown prince of the kingdom of Tortall. | Tamora Pierce |
| Duke Roger of Conté | The Song of the Lioness | The cousin of Prince Jonathan. | Tamora Pierce |
| Prince Heinrich | Discworld | The ruler of the principality of Zlobenia (a parody of Slovenia) and the heir to the throne of the neighboring duchy of Borogravia after the death of Duchess Annagovia. | Terry Pratchett |
| King Teppic | Discworld | King Pteppicymon XXVIII, formerly the crown prince of Djelibeybi (the fictional counterpart to Ancient Egypt) and the half-brother of Queen Ptraci I; the son of the late King Pteppicymon XXVII. | Terry Pratchett |
| Prince Rudolf | The Tin Princess | A part of the Sally Lockhart series, Rudolf was the crown prince of Razkavia who was going to be a new king after his father's death but was suddenly killed during his coronation. | Philip Pullman |
| Ruslan | Ruslan and Ludmila | The brave knight who would marry Ludmila, daughter of Prince Vladimir after the rescue, in the 1820 Russian poem by Alexander Pushkin. | Alexander Pushkin |
| Prince Vladimir | Ruslan and Ludmila | The ruler of Kiev and the father of Ludmila. Based on the historical figure of Vladimir the Great. | Alexander Pushkin |
| Prince Yelsei | The Tale of the Dead Princess and the Seven Knights | Also called "The Tale of the Dead Tsarevna and the Seven Bogatyrs", the 1833 Russian poem by Alexander Pushkin. | Alexander Pushkin |
| Prince Gvidon | The Tale of Tsar Saltan | 1831 Russian poem written after the fairy tale edited by Vladimir Dahl. | Alexander Pushkin |
| Prince Arlis | Dragon Prince and Dragon Star trilogies | The prince of Kierst-Isel who was the grandson of Prince Volog of Kierst and Prince Saumer of Isel. | Melanie Rawn |
| Prince Davvi | Dragon Prince and Dragon Star trilogies | The prince of Syr and the lord of River Run; the older brother of the Sunrunner witch and the High Princess, Sioned. | Melanie Rawn |
| Prince Jastri | Dragon Prince and Dragon Star trilogies | The prince of Syr and the older brother of Princess Gemma; the main antagonist of the trilogies. | Melanie Rawn |
| Prince Laric | Dragon Prince and Dragon Star trilogies | The son of Chadric and Audrite of Dorval and the prince of Firon. | Melanie Rawn |
| Prince Miyon | Dragon Prince and Dragon Star trilogies | The prince of Cunaxa and one of the main villains. | Melanie Rawn |
| Prince Pol | Dragon Prince and Dragon Star trilogies | The son and heir of Prince Rohan and Sioned; one of the main protagonists of the trilogies. | Melanie Rawn |
| Prince Roelstra | Dragon Prince and Dragon Star trilogies | The High Prince of Princemarch and one of the primary antagonists of the trilogies. | Melanie Rawn |
| Prince Rohan | Dragon Prince and Dragon Star trilogies | The Dragon Prince of the Desert, the son of Prince Zehava and Milar and the husband of the Sunrunner witch, Sioned. He is one of the main protagonists of the trilogies. | Melanie Rawn |
| Prince Norman ("Noman") | Fearsome Tales for Fiendish Kids | The young prince, and later king, of Misery. | Jamie Rix |
| Prince Egor | Grizzly Tales for Gruesome Kids | He is the prince who quickly becomes the crowned king of Ruritania. | Jamie Rix |
| Little Prince | The Little Prince (Le Petit Prince) | He is a young prince who visits each of various planets in space, including Earth. | Antoine de Saint-Exupéry |
| Sandokan | The Tigers of Mompracem | The last of a dynasty of Borneo, he is the prince and rightful heir who sails across the South China Sea as a pirate under the alias "The Tiger of Malaysia". | Emilio Salgari |
| Prince of Lormere | The Sin Eater's Daughter | The son of the Queen of Lormere. | Melinda Salisbury |
| Duke of Albany | King Lear | The husband of Goneril of Britain. | William Shakespeare |
| Duke of Burgundy | King Lear | | William Shakespeare |
| Duke of Cornwall | King Lear | The husband of Regan of Britain. | William Shakespeare |
| Donalbain | Macbeth | He is the younger son of King Duncan of Scotland. Based on the historical figure of Donald III of Scotland. | William Shakespeare |
| Malcolm | Macbeth | He is older son of King Duncan and the brother of Donalbain. Based on the historical figure of Malcolm III of Scotland. | William Shakespeare |
| Don Pedro | Much Ado About Nothing | The prince of Aragon. | William Shakespeare |
| Don John | Much Ado About Nothing | Don Pedro's brother. | William Shakespeare |
| Prince Othello | Othello | He is the Moorish prince and the title character of the story, who lives in Venice. | William Shakespeare |
| Prince Pericles | Pericles, Prince of Tyre | He is the ruling prince of Tyre and the titular character of the story; the father of Marina and the husband of Thaisa, daughter of King Simonides of Pentapolis. | William Shakespeare |
| Duke of Aumerle | Richard II | Based on the historical figure of Edward of Norwich, 2nd Duke of York. | William Shakespeare |
| Duke of Surrey | Richard II | Based on the historical figure of Thomas Holland, 1st Duke of Surrey. | William Shakespeare |
| Duke of York | Richard II | The father of the Duke of Aumerle and the uncle of King Richard II. Based on the historical figure, Edmund of Langley, 1st Duke of York. | William Shakespeare |
| Henry Bolingbroke IV | Richard II | The duke, and later king, of Hereford. Based on the historical figure, Henry IV of England. | William Shakespeare |
| John of Gaunt | Richard II | The duke of Lancaster, the father of Henry Bolingbroke and the uncle of King Richard II. Based on the historical figure of John of Gaunt. | William Shakespeare |
| Thomas Mowbray | Richard II | The duke of Norfolk who is based on the historical figure, Thomas de Mowbray, 1st Duke of Norfolk. | William Shakespeare |
| Prince Escalus | Romeo and Juliet | He is the ruler of Verona. He is possibly based on the member of the actual Scaliger family, Bartolomeo I. | William Shakespeare |
| Prince Ferdinand | The Tempest | The prince of Naples, son of King Alonso and the husband of Miranda. | William Shakespeare |
| Fortinbras | The Tragedy of Hamlet, Prince of Denmark | He is the crown prince of Norway and the minor character of the story. His father, the former Norwegian king, was also named Fortinbras. | William Shakespeare |
| Prince Hamlet | The Tragedy of Hamlet, Prince of Denmark | The son of the late King Hamlet and Queen Gertrude of Denmark, he is the titular protagonist of the story. | William Shakespeare |
| Prince Amaryllis | Somebody Else's Prince | A short story collected by Evelyn Sharp in The Other Side of the Sun. | Evelyn Sharp |
| Prince Hyacinth | Somebody Else's Prince | The youngest of the four princes. | Evelyn Sharp |
| Hikaru Genji | The Tale of Genji | Better known as the "Shining Prince", he is the second son of Emperor Kiritsubo. | Murasaki Shikibu |
| Otto Johann Friedrich | Prince Otto: A Romance | He is the ruling prince of Grünewald who seeks to prevent his country from revolution and war, while striving to repair his marriage to the discontented Princess Seraphina. | Robert Louis Stevenson |
| Prince Florizel | The Suicide Club | He is the prince of Bohemia and one of the main characters of the short story trilogy. | Robert Louis Stevenson |
| Prince Alexander | The Prince and the Pilgrim | He is the main protagonist of the story. | Mary Stewart |
| Prince Baudouin | The Prince and the Pilgrim | The father of Prince Alexander. | Mary Stewart |
| Miller's Son | Puss in Boots | A young man who is married to the Princess. An Italian fairy tale originally included by Giovanni Francesco Straparola in The Facetious Nights of Straparola, with the different versions published by Giambattista Basile and then by Charles Perrault. | Giovanni Francesco Straparola |
| Prince of Denmark | The Prince and the Princess in the Forest | Danish fairy tale collected in Tang Kristensen's Æventyr far Jylland ("Tales from Jutland") and included by Andrew Lang in The Olive Fairy Book. | Evald Tang Kristensen |
| Duke of Winterset | Monsieur Beaucaire | 1900 short novel by Booth Tarkington. | Booth Tarkington |
| Louis-Philippe d'Orléans ("Beaucaire") | Monsieur Beaucaire | The titular character of the story based on the historical figure of Louis Philippe I, Duke of Orléans. | Booth Tarkington |
| Prince Pompadore | Kabumpo in Oz | The prince of Pumperdink. He marries Princess Peg Amy of Sun-Top Mountain to have a daughter Pajonia. | Ruth Plumly Thompson |
| Prince Randy | The Purple Prince of Oz | The prince of Regalia. Illustrated by John R. Neill. | Ruth Plumly Thompson |
| Curufin | The Silmarillion | The prince of the elves of Noldor. | J. R. R. Tolkien |
| Faramir II | The Lord of the Rings; The Two Towers; The Return of the King | The prince of Ithilien, the second son of the Steward Denethor II and the younger brother of Boromir. He is also the husband of Éowyn, princess of Rohan. | J. R. R. Tolkien |
| Finarfin | The Lord of the Rings; The Silmarillion | The prince, and later high king, of Noldor and the son of King Finwë and Queen Indis; the husband of Princess Eärwen of Teleri. | J. R. R. Tolkien |
| Imrahil | The Lord of the Rings; The Return of the King | The prince of Dol Amroth. | J. R. R. Tolkien |
| Legolas | The Fellowship of the Ring; The Two Towers; The Return of the King | Though he never actually held the title of "prince", Legolas is an elven prince of Mirkwood and the son of King Thranduil. | J. R. R. Tolkien |
| Prince Dmitri Ivanovich Nekhlyudov | Resurrection | | Leo Tolstoy |
| Prince Andrei Nikolayevich Bolkonsky | War and Peace | The son of the domineering Prince Nikolay Andreevich Bolkonsky. | Leo Tolstoy |
| Edward Tudor, Prince of Wales | The Prince and the Pauper | He is the Prince of Wales who trades places with Tom Canty and later becomes the King of England. Based on the historical Edward VI. | Mark Twain |
| Wulfgar, Abas and Kenric | Heir Apparent | The three legitimate sons of Queen Andreanna and the late King Cynric and three brothers of Princess Janine de St. Jehan. | Vivian Vande Velde |
| Prince Dakkar (aka Captain Nemo) | Twenty Thousand Leagues Under the Seas; The Mysterious Island | The former Hindu prince of Bundelkhand who serves as the captain of his submarine, the Nautilus. | Jules Verne |
| Judah Ben-Hur | Ben-Hur: A Tale of the Christ | He is the Jewish Prince of Jerusalem and the titular character of the story. | Lew Wallace |
| Prince Manfred | The Shape of Things to Come | The ruler of Bavaria and the leader of the worldwide rebellion. | H.G. Wells |
| Prince Ilaron | The Fall of Ile-Rien trilogy | He is the crown prince of Ile-Rien. | Martha Wells |
| Arthur Pendragon ("Wart") | The Once and Future King | Based upon a reworking Le Morte d'Arthur about the legendary King Arthur, he was formerly the prince of England, son of the deceased King Uther Pendragon. Due to his father's death, Arthur was originally fostered by Sir Ector and his son Kay until he later became the new King of England after pulling his Excalibur out of the stone and anvil. | T. H. White |
| Happy Prince | The Happy Prince and Other Tales | | Oscar Wilde |
| Prince Daystar | Enchanted Forest Chronicles series | | Patricia C. Wrede |
| Prince Therandil | Enchanted Forest Chronicles series | | Patricia C. Wrede |
| Prince Henry | Red, White & Royal Blue | British prince and fourth in line to the British throne. | Casey McQuiston |

== Comics ==
| Fictional prince | Comic title | Notes |
|---|---|---|
| Prince Abdullah | The Adventures of Tintin | The young, spoiled, mischievous prince of the fictional Arabian state of Khemed; the son of Mohammed Ben Kalish Ezab. Based on Faisal II of Iraq. |
| Prince of the Sun | The Adventures of Tintin | |
| Prince Ithaca | Andromeda Stories | He is formerly the prince of the empire of Cosmoralia who marries Princess Lilia, in the process crowining him King Astralta III. |
| Prince Jimsa | Andromeda Stories | Ithaca and Lilia's son, and the brother of Princess Affle, who is destined to lead the resistance of planet Astria against the sinister alien machines. |
| Apaimanee | Apaimanee Saga | The first prince and heir of Rattana; the first son of Thao Srisutat and Pratumkesorn. |
| Srisuwan | Apaimanee Saga | The second prince and heir of Rattana; the younger brother of Apaimanee and the second son of Thao Srisutat and Pratumkesorn. |
| Brion Markov (Geo-Force) | DC Comics | He is the prince of Markovia and the half-brother of Tara Markov / Terra. |
| Etrigan the Demon | DC Comics | In post-Crisis continuity, Etrigan is depicted as a prince of Hell and the son of the Archduke Belial. |
| Prince Evillo | DC Comics | The evil prince of the planet Tartarus. |
| Prince Amentep (Ibis the Invincible) | DC Comics | An ancient Egyptian prince who was resurrected by the wizard Shazam and used his vast powers to become a crimefighter. |
| Prince Khufu | DC Comics | Khufu is an Egyptian prince who was killed by his rival Hath-Set. His soul was reborn as Carter Hall, the hero Hawkman. |
| Ryand'r | DC Comics | The prince of the planet Tamaran and the younger brother of Komand'r / Blackfire and Koriand'r / Starfire. He is also a member of the Omega Men as Darkfire. |
| Topaz | DC Comics | The prince of Gemworld. |
| Tuftan | DC Comics | The prince of the Tiger People in the alternate future of Earth-AD and an ally of Kamandi. |
| Viking Prince | DC Comics | A Viking who fell in love with a Valkyrie and was cursed by Odin with invulnerability to all known weapons. He is killed by a plastique, which was created after the curse was cast. |
| Prince Barin | Flash Gordon | The sovereign of Arboria. |
| Prince Thun | Flash Gordon | He is the prince of the Lion Men and the son of King Jugrid. |
| Prince Vultan | Flash Gordon | He is the prince of the Hawkmen. |
| Shin Lee | Goong | The crown prince of Korea. |
| Sun Lee | Goong | The younger brother of Shin Lee. |
| Princes of Kakin | Hunter × Hunter | The sons of King Nasubi Hui Guo Rou of the Kakin kingdom: Benjamin Hui Guo Rou; Zhang Lei Hui Guo Rou; Tserriednich Hui Guo Rou; Luzurus Hui Guo Rou; Salé-salé Hui Guo Rou; Halkenburg Hui Guo Rou; Marayam Hui Guo Rou |
| Rei | Kilala Princess | The prince of Paradiso who seeks for one princess for his country. |
| Prince Joon | A Kiss for my Prince | |
| Prince Shion | A Kiss for my Prince | |
| Prince Yu-Jen | A Kiss for my Prince | |
| Prince Ludwig | Ludwig Kakumei | Also known simply as Lui, he is a flamboyant prince and a womanizer who is forced by his father the King to find a princess to marry and bears an uncanny resmblance to his mother Queen Amalberga. Ludwig is also the stepbrother of Prince Julius. He is named after Jacob Ludwig Grimm. |
| Namor | Marvel Comics | He is the prince of Atlantis and the mutant son of Fen and Leonard McKenzie. |
| Peter Quill / Star-Lord | Marvel Comics | Peter Quill is the son of J'son, the emperor of the alien Spartax species, making him a prince and J'son's heir. |
| Prince Rudolfo Fortunov | Marvel Comics | He is the former crown prince of Latveria. |
| Prince Zorba Fortunov | Marvel Comics | He is the brother of Rudolfo Fortunov and was formerly the prince of Latveria before he later became king. |
| Asbel | Nausicaä of the Valley of the Wind | The Prince of Pejite and the twin brother of the deceased Princess Rastel. |
| Crown Prince Sebastian | The Prince and the Dressmaker | He is the crown prince of Belgium who cross-dresses as the glamorous Lady Crystallia by night. |
| Prince Nathan | Prince Valiant | He is the son of Prince Valiant of Thule and Queen Aleta of the Misty Isles. |
| Prince of the Tambourine Star | Princess Comet | |
| Prince Franz Charming | Princess Knight | He is the prince of Goldland. |
| Prince Roy | Royal Roy | The young prince of Cashelot. |
| Princes from Sailor Moon | Sailor Moon | Mamoru Chiba (Chiba Mamoru, "Darien"), Tuxedo Mask – Prince Endymion; Prince Demand – The leader of the Black Moon Clan; Blue Saphir – One of the members of the Black Moon Clan and the younger brother of Prince Demand |
| Prince Ahmad | Shounen Princess: Putri Harimau Naoko | The "prince" of the Southeast Asian country of Urunei who is actually a woman disguised as a man in place of her late twin brother the previous prince, who died in an accident fifteen years ago, and later marries Naotora, a young man who came to her country pretending to be a woman. |
| Shuna | Shuna's Journey | He is the prince from the small mountain valley who is on a quest to find the golden grain. |
| Prince Alfonse | The Sword of Paros | The half-brother of the King of Paros who tries to get his niece Princess Erminia to marry Prince Phaon. |
| Prince Phaon | The Sword of Paros | The prince of the neighboring kingdom of Kauros who Erminia has been chosen to marry him but repeatedly rejects it due to being lesbian. |
| Prince Canute | Vinland Saga | The prince of the Danes and the son of King Sweyn Forkbeard. Based on the historical Canute the Great. |
| Prince Harald | Vinland Saga | The deceased older brother of Prince Canute. Based on the historical Harald II of Denmark. |

== Theatre ==
| Fictional prince | Title | Notes |
|---|---|---|
| Aladdin | Aladdin | The traditional pantomime was originally dramatized by John O'Keeffe in 1788 for the Theatre Royal, Covent Garden. Different versions of the pantomime story have been performed for over 200 years. The "Aladdin" story was also adapted into other theatrical productions. Notable adaptations include: Aladdin (1805), verse drama by Adam Oehlenschläger; with incidental music by Carl Nielsen.; The New Aladdin (1906), successful Edwardian musical comedy; Originally starred Lily Elsie as "Lally"; Aladdin, the 1979 musical adaptation |
| Prince Luiz | The Gondoliers | He is the prince who is engaged to the Duke of Plaza-Toro's daughter, and at the end he marries her and they become King and Queen of Barataria. |
| Prince Chulalongkorn | The King and I | The eldest son and heir of King Mongkut of Siam; based on the real-life Chulalongkorn. The 1951 Broadway musical composed by Richard Rodgers and written by Oscar Hammerstein II based on the semi-fictionalized novel Anna and the King of Siam. |
| Prince Leonce | Leonce and Lena | The Crown Prince of the Kingdom of Popo. |
| Prince Alexander | The Light Princess | The prince of Lagobel and the brother of Princess Althea. Based on the Scottish fairy tale of the same name by George MacDonald. |
| Prince Digby | The Light Princess | The prince of Sealand. |
| Tamino | The Magic Flute | He also appears in the following sequels, Das Labyrinth and The Magic Flute Part Two. |
| Prince Tokmakov | The Maid of Pskov | Prince Yuriy Ivanovich Tokmakov. The adoptive father of Princess Olga and the brother-in-law of Vera Sheloga. 1872 opera composed by Nikolai Rimsky-Korsakov, based on the drama of the same name by Lev Mei. |
| Prince Afanasy | The Maid of Pskov | Prince Afanasy Vyazemsky |
| Nanki-Poo | The Mikado | He is the wandering minstrel who is later revealed as the son of the Mikado of Japan. |
| Nutcracker Prince | The Nutcracker | He is the prince who has been turned into a nutcracker. |
| Prince Karl | | Old Heidelberg, the 1901 German play by Wilhelm Meyer-Förster.; The Student Prince, the 1924 operetta composed by Sigmund Romberg. |
| Prince Dauntless | Once Upon a Mattress | A musical comedy based on Hans Christian Andersen's The Princess and the Pea. |
| Prince Hilarion | The Princess; Princess Ida | The Princess, a blank verse farcical play by W. S. Gilbert, parodying Alfred Tennyson's poem, "The Princess: A Medley".; Princess Ida, a comic opera; music by Arthur Sullivan, libretto by W. S. Gilbert. Based on the poem "The Princess" by Alfred Tennyson. |
| Three Princes | The Princess; Princess Ida | Prince Arac; Prince Guron; Prince Scynthius |
| Jean | Puss in Boots | 1915 short children's opera in three acts composed by César Cui, based on the fairy tale of the same name. |
| Prince Yeletsky | The Queen of Spades | 1890 opera in three acts (seven scenes) by Pyotr Ilyich Tchaikovsky, based on the short story of the same name by Alexander Pushkin. |
| Prince Keri of Zalgar | The Queen Was in the Parlour | 1926 play written by Noël Coward. |
| Prince Dimitri Nekhlyudov | Resurrection | Risurrezione, 1904 Italian opera/drama composed by Franco Alfano.; Vzkriesenie, 1960 Slovak opera composed by Ján Cikker.; Resurrection, 1999 American opera composed by Tod Machover.; Based on the novel of the same name by Leo Tolstoy. |
| Ratmir | Ruslan and Lyudmila | The prince of Khazars. 1842 Russian opera composed by Mikhail Glinka, based on Alexander Pushkin's poem of the same name. |
| Ruslan | Ruslan and Lyudmila | The main protagonist of the opera. |
| Svetozar | Ruslan and Lyudmila | The Great Prince of Kiev. |
| Prince Désiré | The Sleeping Beauty | The ballet composed by Pyotr Ilyich Tchaikovsky, based on Charles Perrault's fairy tale of the same name. |
| Prince Charles | The Sleeping Prince: An Occasional Fairy Tale | 1953 play by Terence Rattigan. |
| Prince | The Snow Queen | A chamber opera in six scenes based on the fairy tale of the same name; prologue by Matthew King, libretto by Andrew McKinnon. |
| Prince Siegfried | Swan Lake | He is the prince who is the love interest of the Swan-Princess Odette. |
| Agis | The Triumph of Love | He is the prince and rightful heir to the throne of Sparta and the son of the deposed King Cléomène. The play was originally written by Pierre de Marivaux in 1732 and later adapted into a Broadway musical in 1997 by James Magruder. |
| Disney Princes | Various | A number of Disney Princes have gotten their own musicals.: Title character in Aladdin; Beast in Beauty and the Beast; Hans in Frozen; Title character in Hercules; Simba in The Lion King; Eric in The Little Mermaid; Li Shang in Mulan Jr. |
| Prince Anatole Kuragin | War and Peace | 1946 opera based on the novel of the same name by Leo Tolstoy. |
| Prince Andrei Bolkonsky | War and Peace | 1946 opera based on the novel of the same name by Leo Tolstoy. |
| Prince Mikhail Barclay de Tolly | War and Peace | 1946 opera based on the novel of the same name by Leo Tolstoy. |
| Prince Marcus | Yahudi Ki Ladki | The historical Urdu play Agha Hashar Kashmiri. |
| Azor | Zémire et Azor | Operatic version of the fairy tale Beauty and the Beast, written by Jean-François Marmontel and composed by André Grétry. |

== Film ==
=== Live action ===
| Fictional prince | Film | Notes |
|---|---|---|
| Judah Ben-Hur | Ben-Hur | Ramon Novarro in the 1925 silent film version.; Charlton Heston in the 1959 version.; Jack Huston in the 2016 version.; Based on Lew Wallace's novel Ben-Hur: A Tale of the Christ. |
| Prince Rohenhauer | Black Oxen | Based on the novel Black Oxen by Gertrude Atherton. Portrayed by Alan Hale Sr. |
| T'Challa ("Black Panther") | Black Panther | He is the former prince, and now king, of Wakanda; the son of the late King T'Chaka and the brother of Princess Shuri. Portrayed by Chadwick Boseman. |
| Prince Mamuwalde/Blacula | Blacula; Scream Blacula Scream | An African prince who was turned into a vampire by Count Dracula. Portrayed by William Marshall. |
| Prince Ramon | The Brigand | Portrayed by Anthony Quinn. |
| Prince Achmed | Bulldog Drummond Strikes Back | Portrayed by Warner Oland. |
| Prince Alexis Paneiev/Paul | Café Metropole | Portrayed by Gregory Ratoff. |
| Myles, 12th Duke of Dunbar | A Castle for Christmas | The ill-tempered Scottish duke who owns the fictional Dun Dunbar Castle (modeled after Dalmeny House). He is portrayed by Cary Elwes. |
| Yuvaraj Sukumar | Chandra | Portrayed by Vivek. |
| Veerasimhan | Chandralekha | 1948 Indian film. Portrayed by M. K. Radha. |
| Prince Pondicherry | Charlie and the Chocolate Factory | Based on the novel of the same name by Roald Dahl. Portrayed by Nitin Ganatra. |
| Prince Richard | A Christmas Prince; A Christmas Prince: The Royal Wedding; A Christmas Prince: The Royal Baby | He is formerly the crown prince, and now king, of Aldovia. Portrayed by Ben Lamb. |
| Prince Alexander Cavalieri | Christmas with a Prince | 2018 television film. Portrayed by Nick Hounslow. |
| Prince Caspian | The Chronicles of Narnia: Prince Caspian | Based on the novel by C. S. Lewis. Portrayed by Ben Barnes. |
| Prince Akeem Joffer | Coming to America | Akeem, portrayed by Eddie Murphy, was formerly the crown prince of Zamunda, son of the late King Jaffe and Queen Aoleon Joffer. He later becomes the king of Zamunda in the sequel Coming 2 America. |
| Prince Metternich | Conquest | Based on the novel Pani Walewska by Wacław Gąsiorowski. Portrayed by Ian Wolfe. |
| Prince Mirska | Conquest | Portrayed by Stanley Andrews. |
| Prince Poniatowski | Conquest | Portrayed by C. Henry Gordon. |
| Prince Jai | Curse of the Golden Flower | The middle son of Emperor Ping and Empress Phoenix. Portrayed by Jay Chou. |
| Crown Prince Wan | Curse of the Golden Flower | The elder son of Emperor Ping and Empress Phoenix. Portrayed by Liu Ye. |
| Prince Yu | Curse of the Golden Flower | The younger son of Emperor Ping and Empress Phoenix. Portrayed by Qin Junjie. |
| Prince Sirki | Death Takes a Holiday | Portrayed by Fredric March. |
| Einon | Dragonheart | He was formerly the prince who becomes a tyrannical king and shares part of the heart of the last dragon, Draco. He is the son of the late King Freyne and Queen Aislinn. Portrayed by Lee Oakes as a child and David Thewlis as an adult. |
| Edric | Dragonheart: Battle for the Heartfire | He is the biological son of the late King Walter of Britannia, grandson of King Gareth and Queen Rhonu and twin brother of Mehgan. Portrayed by Tom Rhys Harries. |
| Prince Azim | The Drum | Based on the novel of the same name by A. E. W. Mason. Portrayed by Sabu Dastagir. |
| Prince Ghul | The Drum | Portrayed by Raymond Massey. |
| Prince Harshvardhan | Eklavya: The Royal Guard | 2007 Indian film. Portrayed by Saif Ali Khan |
| Prince Udaywardhan | Eklavya: The Royal Guard | Portrayed by Jimmy Sheirgill. |
| Prince Charmont | Ella Enchanted | Based on the 1997 book of the same name by Gail Carson Levine. Portrayed by Hugh Dancy. |
| Prince Johann | The Emperor's Candlesticks | 1937 film based on the 1899 novel of the same name. Portrayed by Henry Stephenson. |
| Prince Edward | Enchanted | He is the prince from Andalasia who ends up confused with the world of New York City once entering it; stepson of the evil Queen Narissa. Portrayed by James Marsden. |
| Prince Henry | Ever After: A Cinderella Story | 1998 film adaptation of "Cinderella" set in Renaissance France. Portrayed by Dougray Scott. |
| Prince Karl "Charles" von Waldron | The Fall of a Nation | Based on the novel of the same name. Portrayed by Percy Standing. |
| Prince Michael | Fit for a King | Portrayed by Donald Briggs. |
| Prince Michael Boris Alexis | Gateway | Portrayed by Gregory Ratoff. |
| George Jr. | George of the Jungle 2 | He is the prince of the jungle and the son of George of the Jungle and Ursula Stanhope. Portrayed by Angus T. Jones. |
| Prince Koura | The Golden Voyage of Sinbad | The main antagonist of the film. Portrayed by Tom Baker. |
| Friedrich Hapnick | The Great Race | He is the foppish and alcoholic crown prince of Carpania and the look-alike of villainous Professor Fate, whose Baron Rolf von Stuppe and General Kuhster plot for a military coup. Both Friedrich and Fate were portrayed by Jack Lemmon. |
| Fortinbras | Hamlet | Fortinbras, the Norwegian crown prince, has been included in only a couple of the adaptations of William Shakespeare's Hamlet, portrayed by a few different actors: Fritz Achterberg in Hamlet: The Drama of Vengeance, a 1921 German silent film.; Rufus Sewell in Hamlet (1996). |
| Prince Hamlet | Hamlet | Numerous adaptations of William Shakespeare's Hamlet have been made over the years, starring several different actors. Some of these include: Sarah Bernhardt in Le Duel d'Hamlet, the 1900 French film.; Ruggero Ruggeri in Hamlet (1917), the Italian silent film.; Asta Nielsen in Hamlet: The Drama of Vengeance, a 1921 German silent film.; Sohrab Modi in Khoon Ka Khoon, a 1935 Hindi/Urdu film.; Laurence Olivier in Hamlet (1948), a British film.; Maximilian Schell in Hamlet (1961), a German film.; Innokenti Smoktunovsky in Gamlet, a 1964 Russian film.; Nicol Williamson in Hamlet (1969), a British film.; Mel Gibson in Hamlet (1990).; Kenneth Branagh in Hamlet (1996). |
| Prince Nicholas/Nicki | Here is My Heart | Based on the play La Grande-Duchesse et le garçon d'étage by Alfred Savoir. Portrayed by Roland Young. |
| Prince Vladimir/Vova | Here is My Heart | Portrayed by Reginald Owen. |
| Crown Prince | Home Alone 4 | Portrayed by Craig Geldenhuys. |
| Crown Prince Leopold | The Illusionist | The villainous and influential heir to the throne of Austria-Hungary. Portrayed by Rufus Sewell. |
| Prince Jeroným | It Is Hell With the Princess | 2009 Czech film. Portrayed by Jiří Mádl. |
| John Carter | John Carter | Based on Edgar Rice Burroughs' A Princess of Mars. Portrayed by Taylor Kitsch. |
| Prince Joachim | Jungle Cruise | He was the ambitious German aristocrat who financed and led a military expedition to claim the Tree of Life for himself. He is loosely based on the real-life Prince Joachim of Prussia and was portrayed by Jesse Plemons. |
| Prince Julio | Kath & Kimderella | Julio, portrayed by Erin Mullally, is the prince of the former kingdom of Papilloma who is meant to be married to Kim Craig, but fails. He is the adoptive son of the last king Javier. |
| Yuvraj Vikram Singh Rathore | Khoobsurat | He is the prince of Rajasthan, older brother of Princess Divya and son of King Shekhar Singh and Queen Nirmala Devi Rathore, who marries Dr. Mili Chakravarty, although he was formerly a fiancé to Lady Kiara. Portrayed by Fawad Khan. |
| Prince Alexis | King Kelly of the U.S.A. | The prince of the neighboring country of Moronia who invades the kingdom of Belgardia and seizes its castle. Portrayed by William Orlamond. |
| Colwyn | Krull | Portrayed by Ken Marshall. |
| Prince Ferdi Zu Schwarzwald | Lancer Spy | Based on the story by Marthe McKenna. Portrayed by Joseph Schildkraut. |
| Mohammed Khan | The Lives of a Bengal Lancer | The well-known prince of the region. Portrayed by Douglass Dumbrille. |
| Prince Paul of Arvonne | The Lone Wolf in Paris | Portrayed by Pio Peretti. |
| Crown Prince Otto | Long Live the King | Based on the novel of the same name by Mary Roberts Rinehart. Portrayed by Jackie Coogan. |
| Boromir | The Lord of the Rings | The fallen prince of the Stewards of Gondor. Portrayed by Sean Bean. |
| Faramir | The Lord of the Rings | The younger brother of Boromir. Portrayed by David Wenham. |
| Legolas | The Lord of the Rings | Though he actually never held the title of "prince", he is the son of the elven King Thranduil of Mirkwood. Portrayed by Orlando Bloom. |
| Prince Ramo | Lost in a Harem | Portrayed by John Conte. |
| Prince Nicholas Alexnov | Meet the Prince | A former Russian prince who was bankrupted. Portrayed by Joseph Schildkraut. |
| Prince Danilo Petrovich | The Merry Widow | The nephew of King Nikita I of Monteblanco. Based on the operetta of the same name by Franz Lehár. Portrayed by John Gilbert. |
| Crown Prince Mirko | The Merry Widow | Portrayed by Roy D'Arcy. |
| Prince Otto Von Liebenheim | Monte Carlo | Based on the novel Monsieur Beaucaire by Booth Tarkington. Portrayed by Claud Allister. |
| Prince Herbert | Monty Python and the Holy Grail | Portrayed by Terry Jones. |
| Prince Alexander "Alex" Theodore William Hendricks | My Christmas Prince | He is the crown prince of Madelvia. Portrayed by Callum Alexander in the 2017 Lifetime television film. |
| Prince Colin | My Summer Prince | The prince of Edgemere. Portrayed by Jack Turner in the 2016 Hallmark television film. |
| Prince de Namour de la Bonfain | Naughty Marietta | Based on the 1910 operetta of the same name by Victor Herbert. Portrayed by Douglass Dumbrille. |
| Prince Kishan | North West Frontier | The son of the recently deceased Hindu Maharajah. Portrayed by Govind Raja Ross. |
| Prince of Rapur | The Notorious Lone Wolf | Portrayed by Olaf Hytten. |
| Prince Kamal Khan | Octopussy | Exiled Afghan prince and the secondary antagonist of the film. Portrayed by Louis Jourdan. |
| Prince Karl | Old Heidelberg | Old Heidelberg (1915), an American silent film starring Wallace Reid.; Old Heidelberg (1923), a German silent drama starring Paul Hartmann.; The Student Prince in Old Heidelberg (1927), the MGM silent film starring Ramon Novarro.; The Student Prince (1954), a musical film starring Edmund Purdom.; Old Heidelberg (1959), the West German film starring Christian Wolff.; Based on the 1901 play by Wilhelm Meyer-Förster and the 1924 operetta by Sigmund Romberg. |
| Prince Ahmud | Omar Khayyam | Portrayed by Perry Lopez. |
| Prince Malik | Omar Khayyam | Portrayed by John Derek. |
| Prince Eric | Paid to Love | Portrayed by William Powell. |
| Crown Prince Michael | Paid to Love | Portrayed by George O'Brien. |
| Yuvraj Ajay Singh | Prem Ratan Dhan Payo | The antagonist of the Indian film. Portrayed by Neil Nitin Mukesh. |
| Prem Dilwale | Prem Ratan Dhan Payo | He is married to Princess Maithili Devi. Portrayed by Salman Khan. |
| Yuvraj Vijay Singh | Prem Ratan Dhan Payo | The crown prince of Pritampur, the half-brother of Ajay and the doppelgänger of Prem. Also portrayed by Salman Khan. |
| Prince Frederick | Pretty Princess | 1993 Italian film, portrayed by Adam Barker. |
| Prince Max | Pretty Princess | The ruler of a small principality of Liechtenhaus and the father of Princess Sofia. Portrayed by David Warner. |
| Prince Shamsher Singh | Prince | Portrayed by Shammi Kapoor. |
| Edvard III/Eddie Williams | The Prince & Me; The Prince & Me 2: The Royal Wedding; The Prince & Me: A Royal Honeymoon; The Prince & Me: The Elephant Adventure | The former crown prince, and now king, of Denmark and the son of King Haraald and Queen Rosalind. Portrayed by Luke Mably and Chris Geere. |
| Prince Albert | The Prince & Me 2: The Royal Wedding | Portrayed by Jim Holt. |
| Prince Vladimir | The Prince & Me 2: The Royal Wedding | Portrayed by Mirek Hrabe. |
| Prince Georgiev | The Prince & Me: A Royal Honeymoon | The prince of Belavia. Portrayed by Valentin Ganev. |
| Alu | The Prince & Me: The Elephant Adventure | He is married to Princess Myra to become the king of Sangyoon. Portrayed by Amarin Cholvibul. |
| Velen | The Prince and the Evening Star | The son of the Old King. Portrayed by Juraj Ďurdiak in the 1979 Czech film. |
| Edward Tudor, Prince of Wales | The Prince and the Pauper | Multiple film adaptations of Mark Twain's novel have been made. Some of these include: The Prince and the Pauper (1909), a two-reel short, with Cecil Spooner as Edward, featuring rare film footage of Mark Twain, shot by Thomas Edison at Twain's Connecticut home.; The Prince and the Pauper (1915), the lost silent film with Marguerite Clark as Edward; The Prince and the Pauper (1920), an Austrian film with Tibor Lubinszky.; The Prince and the Pauper (1937), with Bobby Mauch as Edward.; The Prince and the Pauper (1977), also known as Crossed Swords, with Mark Lester as Edward.; The Prince and the Pauper (2000), a British film with Jonathan Timmins as Edward. |
| Prince Charles | The Prince and the Showgirl | The regent prince of Carpathia. Based on Terence Rattigan's play The Sleeping Prince. Portrayed by Laurence Olivier. |
| Prince Edward | The Prince and the Surfer | The prince of Gelfland, and the son of Queen Albertina, who trades places with skateboarding surfer Cash Canty. Both Edward and Cash are portrayed by Sean Kellman in the updated adaptation of The Prince and the Pauper. |
| Prince "Charming" John | Prince Charming | The Prince of Anwyn who is cursed as a frog. Portrayed by Sean Maguire in the 2001 television film. |
| Prince Duncan | A Prince for Christmas | 2015 Starz television film. Duncan is the prince and the heir of Balemont, portrayed by Kirk Barker. |
| Dastan | Prince of Persia: The Sands of Time | He was adopted by King Sharaman of Persia. Based on the video game of the same name. Portrayed by Jake Gyllenhaal. |
| Prince Garsiv | Prince of Persia: The Sands of Time | Portrayed by Toby Kebbell. |
| Prince Nizam | Prince of Persia: The Sands of Time | The brother of King Sharaman. Portrayed by Ben Kingsley. |
| Prince Tus | Prince of Persia: The Sands of Time | Portrayed by Richard Coyle. |
| Prince Valiant | Prince Valiant | Robert Wagner in the 1954 version.; Stephen Moyer in the 1997 version. |
| Prince Humperdinck | The Princess Bride | Based on the novel of the same name. Portrayed by Chris Sarandon. |
| Prince Regent | Princess Caraboo | Portrayed by John Sessions. |
| Prince Ashton | A Princess for Christmas | The prince of Castlebury. Portrayed by Sam Heughan in the 2011 Hallmark television film. |
| Eddie O'Rourke | Princess O'Rourke | Portrayed by Robert Cummings, Eddie is married to Princess Maria. 1943 romantic comedy similar to the 1953 film Roman Holiday. |
| Prince Philip | Princess of Thieves | The illegitimate son of the late King Richard the Lionheart, based on the historical Philip of Cognac. Portrayed by Stephen Moyer in the 2001 television film inspired by the Robin Hood legend. |
| Prince Edward Wyndham | The Princess Switch | He is the crown prince of the Kingdom of Belgravia and the son of King George and Queen Caroline Wyndham. The films are inspired by Mark Twain's novel The Prince and the Pauper. Portrayed by Sam Palladio. |
| Kevin Richards | The Princess Switch | He becomes the future prince consort under the marriage of Lady Margaret Delacourt, duchess of Montenaro. Portrayed by Nick Sagar. |
| Prince Nikolas | Pursuit to Algiers | Portrayed by Leslie Vincent. |
| The Prince | Pygmalion | Based on the play of the same name. Portrayed by Leo Genn (uncredited). |
| Prince Wolfram | Queen Kelly | Portrayed by Walter Byron. |
| Shamsher Singh | Raaj Tilak | Portrayed by Raj Kiran. |
| Yuvraj Narendradev | Raja Aur Runk | The 1968 Bollywood film based on Mark Twain's The Prince and the Pauper. Portrayed by Mahesh Kothare. |
| Rajkumar | Rajkumar | Portrayed by Anil Kapoor. |
| Crown Prince Lee Young | Rampant | The son of King Lee Jo and the crown prince of the Joseon dynasty. Portrayed by Kim Tae-woo. |
| Prince Paul Chegodieff | Rasputin and the Empress | Portrayed by John Barrymore. |
| Rajkumar Chakravarthy | Rathnagiri Rahasya | Rajkumar, portrayed by Udaykumar, is a prince who ends up becoming a vicious caveman after being separated from his royal family. There is also a similar Indian film Thangamalai Ragasiyam featuring Sivaji Ganesan as Prince Gajendran. |
| Prince Ken Arok | Road to Bali | He is a crafty prince of Bali and the cousin of Princess Lala McTavish. Portrayed by Murvyn Vye. |
| Prince John | Robin Hood | Sam De Grasse in Robin Hood (1922); Claude Rains in The Adventures of Robin Hood (1938); George Macready in Rogues of Sherwood Forest (1950); Hubert Gregg in The Story of Robin Hood and His Merrie Men (1952); Edward Fox in Robin Hood (1991); Richard Lewis in Robin Hood: Men in Tights (1993); Jonathan Hyde in Princess of Thieves (2001); Oscar Isaac in Robin Hood (2010) |
| Prince Serge | The Rogue Song | Portrayed by Ullrich Haupt. |
| Prince Escalus | Romeo and Juliet | Horace Vinton in the 1916 silent film version.; Conway Tearle in the 1936 version.; Robert Stephens in the 1968 version.; Stellan Skarsgård in the 2013 version.; Based on the tragic play by William Shakespeare. |
| Freddie Granton | The Royal Bed | He was speedily married to Princess Anne. Based on the 1928 play The Queen's Husband by Robert E. Sherwood. Portrayed by Anthony Bushell. |
| Crown Prince William of Grec | The Royal Bed | Portrayed by Hugh Trevor. |
| Prince Leopold/Leo James | A Royal Christmas | He is the prince and heir to the throne of Cordinia. Portrayed by Stephen Hagan in the 2014 Hallmark television film. |
| Prince Sebastian | Royal Matchmaker | The son of King Edward. 2018 Hallmark television film. Portrayed by Will Kemp. |
| Prince Jeffrey | Royal New Year's Eve | 2017 Hallmark television film. Portrayed by Sam Page. |
| Prince Thomas | The Royal Treatment | He is the prince of Lavania, and the son of King John and Queen Catherine, whose Manhattan hairdresser Izzy works at his wedding. He is portrayed by Mena Massoud. |
| Prince Daniel | Royally Ever After | The prince of St Ives. Portrayed by Torrance Coombs in the 2018 television film. |
| Ruslan | Ruslan and Ludmila | Based on the Russian poem of the same name. Portrayed by Valeri Kozinets. |
| Sandokan | Sandokan films | The following movies are all based the Sandokan novels by Emilio Salgari.: Luigi Pavese in Pirates of Malaya (Italian: I pirati della Malesia) and The Two Tigers (Italian: Le due tigri), both released in 1941.; Steve Reeves in Sandokan the Great (Italian: Sandokan, la tigre di Mompracem) (1963) and Pirates of Malaysia (Italian: I pirati della Malesia) (1964); Ray Danton in Sandokan to the Rescue (Italian: Sandokan alla riscossa) and Sandokan Against the Leopard of Sarawak (Italian: Sandokan contro il leopardo di Sarawak), released in 1964.; Mimmo Palmara in Temple of the White Elephant (aka Sandok, il Maciste della giungla) (1964); Ivan Rassimov in The Tigers of Mompracem (1970) |
| Prince Ali | Secret of Stamboul | Portrayed by Cecil Ramage. |
| Prince Edmnond/Inmate 34 | Secret Society of Second-Born Royals | A sinister who kills his brother King Robert and plans to take down the monarchy of Illyria. He is the villainous uncle of Princesses Samantha and Eleanor. Portrayed by Greg Bryk. |
| Prince Matteo | Secret Society of Second-Born Royals | He is one of the members of the Secret Society of Second-Born Royals. Portrayed by Faly Rakotohavana. |
| Prince Tuma | Secret Society of Second-Born Royals | He is the other member of the Secret Society of Second-Born Royals. Portrayed by Niles Fitch. |
| Prince George | Seven Nights in Japan | Portrayed by Michael York. |
| Tao Hing | Shaolin Prince | Portrayed by Ti Lung. |
| Wong Szu Tai | Shaolin Prince | Portrayed by Derek Yee. |
| Prince Alexis | Sherlock Holmes | Portrayed by Reginald Denny. |
| Prince Abdullah Khan | The Sign of Four | Based on the British novel of the same name featuring Sherlock Holmes. Portrayed by Fred Raynham. |
| Prince Gianfranco di Siracusa | Silver Bears | The prince of Italy. Portrayed by Louis Jourdan. |
| Captain Arkadiy Trubetskoy | The Silver Skates | In English known as Prince Arkady, he is the prince of the Russian Empire who serves as an officer of the Guard Department. Portrayed by Kirill Zaytsev. |
| Prince Kassim | Sinbad and the Eye of the Tiger | The prince of Charak who was going to be crowned Caliph but was transformed into a baboon by his evil stepmother, Queen Zenobia. Portrayed by Damien Thomas. |
| Prince Ali | Sinbad of the Seven Seas | Portrayed by Roland Wybenga. |
| Prince Edward | The Slipper and the Rose | He is the prince of Euphrania, in the retelling fairy tale of "Cinderella". Portrayed by Richard Chamberlain. |
| Duke of Montague | The Slipper and the Rose | He is the cousin of Prince Edward. Portrayed by Julian Orchard. |
| Prince | The Snow Queen | The 2005 BBC television film based on Hans Christian Andersen's fairy tale of the same name. Portrayed by Bradie Whetham. |
| The Prince | Snow White | Numerous adaptations of the Snow White story have been made over the years, which starred several different actors as well as different names for the Prince from the story. Some include: Creighton Hale as Prince Florimond in Snow White, the 1916 silent film.; Roberto Risso as Prince Charming in The Seven Dwarfs to the Rescue (Italian: I sette nani alla riscossa), the 1951 Italian comedy film.; Niels Clausnitzer as Prince Edelmunt in Snow White and the Seven Dwarfs (German: Schneewittchen und die 7 Zwerge), the 1955 German film.; Edson Stroll as Prince Charming in Snow White and the Three Stooges (1961); James Ian Wright as The Prince in Snow White, the 1987 musical film.; Tyron Leitso as Prince Alfred in Snow White: The Fairest of Them All (2001); Jamie Thomas King as Prince Alexander in Grimm's Snow White (2012); Armie Hammer as Prince Andrew Alcott in Mirror Mirror (2012); Sam Claflin as William in Snow White and the Huntsman (2012) |
| Prince Paul Pavlov | The Son of Monte Cristo | Portrayed by Michael Visaroff. |
| Lone Starr | Spaceballs | He marries Princess Vespa. Portrayed by Bill Pullman. |
| Prince Valium | Spaceballs | Portrayed by Jim J. Bullock. |
| Bail Prestor Organa | Star Wars | Formally styled as His Serene Highness, Bail Organa is the Prince, First chairman and Viceroy of the planet Alderaan. He is the consort of Queen Breha Organa and the adoptive father of Princess Leia Organa. Portrayed by Jimmy Smits in: Attack of the Clones; Revenge of the Sith; Rogue One |
| Princes from Stardust | Stardust | Prince Primus, portrayed by Jason Flemyng; Prince Secundus, portrayed by Rupert Everett; Prince Tertius, portrayed by Mark Heap; The ghost of Prince Quartus, portrayed by Julian Rhind-Tutt; The ghost of Prince Quintus, portrayed by Adam Buxton; The ghost of Prince Sextus, portrayed by David Walliams; Based upon the 1999 novel of the same name by Neil Gaiman. |
| Ramin Khan | Storm Over Bengal | The Maharajah of Lhanapur and the main antagonist of the film. Portrayed by Douglass Dumbrille. |
| Prince Courageous | The Strange Adventures of Prince Courageous | The son of King Lagg. 1923 silent film series starring Arthur Trimble as a child and William Butts as an adult. |
| Crown Prince Albert | The Swan | Adolphe Menjou in The Swan (1925).; Rod La Rocque in the One Romantic Night (1930).; Alec Guinness in The Swan (1956).; Based on the 1920 play, The Swan by Ferenc Molnár. |
| Prince Arsene | The Swan | George Walcott in The Swan (1925); Byron Sage in One Romantic Night (1930); Christopher Cook in The Swan (1956) |
| Prince George | The Swan | Joseph Depew in The Swan (1925); Philippe De Lacy in One Romantic Night (1930); Van Dyke Parks in The Swan (1956) |
| Elias | Tale of Tales | Prince of Longtrellis; portrayed by Christian Lees. Based on the fairy tale collection "Pentamerone". |
| Prince Chung | Thank You, Mr. Moto | Based on the novel of the same name by John P. Marquand. Portrayed by Philip Ahn. |
| Prince Kurt von Rotenberg | They Dare Not Love | The main character who flees Austria. Portrayed by George Brent. |
| Ahmed | The Thief of Bagdad (1924); The Thief of Bagdad (1940) | This character appears in the 1924 silent version and the 1940 Technicolor version of this story, loosely based on the adaptation of the story of "Aladdin". Portrayed by Douglas Fairbanks in 1924 and John Justin in 1940. There are also other princes featured in the 1924 version of the film: Cham Shang, Prince of the Mongols, portrayed by Sojin Kamiyama; The Prince of Indies, portrayed by Noble Johnson; The Prince of Persia, portrayed by Mathilde Comont (uncredited) |
| Prince Osman | The Thief of Baghdad (1961) | Portrayed by Arturo Dominici. |
| Prince Taj | The Thief of Baghdad (1978) | Prince Taj of Sakkar. Portrayed by Kabir Bedi. |
| Prince Rudolph | Thin Ice | Portrayed by Tyrone Power. |
| Loki Laufeyson | Thor | He is the prince of Asgard who is adopted by its King Odin and Queen Frigga; the biological son of Laufey. Portrayed by Tom Hiddleston. |
| Thor Odinson | Thor | He is the crown prince, and later king, of Asgard, the son of King Odin and Queen Frigga and adoptive brother of Loki Laufeyson. Portrayed by Chris Hemsworth. |
| Prince Mikail Alexandrovitch Ouratieff | Tovarich | Portrayed by Charles Boyer. |
| Prince Agis | Triumph of Love Triumph of Love (2001 film) | 2001 film based on the three-act comic play and musical of the same name. Portrayed by Jay Rodan. |
| Prince Florizel of Corovia | Trouble for Two | Based on the short story "The Suicide Club" by Robert Louis Stevenson. Portrayed by Robert Montgomery. |
| Prince Henry | Two Guys from Milwaukee | The prince of the Balkans and one of the main characters of the film. Portrayed by Dennis Morgan. |
| Prince Nicolai Poliakoff | The Unholy Garden | Portrayed by Mischa Auer. |
| The Prince | Vanjikottai Valiban | He is the heir of the Vanjikottai Kingdom and the brother of Princess Padma. Portrayed by Master Murali. |
| Prince Gustav | Waltzes from Vienna | Portrayed by Frank Vosper. |
| Prince Bohemund of Tarentum | The Wandering Jew | Portrayed by Bertram Wallis. |
| Prince Andrei Bolkonsky | War and Peace | The 1956 film based on the novel of the same name. Portrayed by Mel Ferrer. |
| Prince Vasily Kuragin | War and Peace | Portrayed by Tullio Carminati. |
| Prince Dmitri Nekhlyudov | We Live Again | Based on the novel Resurrection by Leo Tolstoy. Portrayed by Fredric March. |
| Prince Nickolas "Nicki" von Wildeliebe-rauffenburg | The Wedding March | Portrayed by Erich von Stroheim. |
| Prince Ottokar | The Wedding March | Portrayed by George Fawcett. |
| Hannoc | When the Redskins Rode | He is the tribal prince of the Delaware Native Americans and the son of Chief Shingiss. Portrayed by Jon Hall. |
| Prince Emile | A Winter Princess | 2019 Hallmark television film. Portrayed by Brendon Zub. |
| Prince Gustav | A Winter Princess | Portrayed by Casey Manderson. |
| Prince Kynd | The Wizard of Oz | Portrayed by Bryant Washburn. |
| Prince Erman | Wizards of the Lost Kingdom II | He is the prince, and later king, of Baldor. Portrayed by Blake Bahner. |
| Prince Hassan | Women of All Nations | Portrayed by Bela Lugosi. |
| Prince Marcus | Yahudi Ki Ladki | Yahudi Ki Ladki (1933), portrayed by K.L. Saigal; Yahudi Ki Ladki (1957); Yahudi (1958), portrayed by Dilip Kumar; Based on the Urdu play of the same name by Agha Hashar Kashmiri. |
| Prince Caryl | Young April | Prince of Belgravia. Based on the novel of the same name by Egerton Castle. Portrayed by Joseph Schildkraut. |
| Prince Michael | Young April | The unethical brother of Caryl. Portrayed by Bryant Washburn. |
| Prince Henry | Red, White & Royal Blue | The spare to the British throne. Portrayed by Nicholas Galitzine. Based on the novel of the same name by Casey McQuiston. |

=== Animation ===
==== Disney ====
| Disney prince(s) | Film(s) | Notes |
|---|---|---|
| Prince Achmed | Aladdin | Voiced by Corey Burton. |
| Aladdin ("Prince Ali") | Aladdin | He is the titular protagonist of the film, who wishes to become a wealthy prince so that he can win over a heart of Princess Jasmine. Voiced by Scott Weinger; singing voice by Brad Kane. |
| Bambi | Bambi; Bambi II | Based on the novel Bambi, a Life in the Woods by Felix Salten, Bambi is the young prince of the forest whose mother was shot and killed during winter. He was originally voiced by Donnie Dunagan as a fawn, Hardie Albright as an adolescent deer and John Sutherland as a young buck, and by Alexander Gould in the sequel. |
| Great Prince of the Forest | Bambi; Bambi II | Bambi's widowed father and the ruler of the forest. Voiced by Fred Shields (original) and Patrick Stewart (sequel). |
| Prince Adam/The Beast | Beauty and the Beast | Voiced by Robby Benson. |
| Harris, Hubert and Hamish | Brave | Triplet sons of King Fergus and Queen Elinor of DunBroch and three younger brothers of Princess Merida. |
| Prince Wheeliam | Cars 2 | He is a royal Bentley Continental GT car, based on the real-life Prince William, Duke of Cambridge; grandson of Queen Elizabeth II of the United Kingdom. |
| Prince Charming | Cinderella | Originally voiced by William Edward Phipps; singing voice by Mike Douglas. |
| Prince Hans Westergaard | Frozen | He is the villainous prince from the Southern Isles, the nemesis of Elsa the Snow Queen of Arendelle and the former love interest of her sister Princess Anna. Voiced by Santino Fontana. |
| Hercules | Hercules | Loosely based on the mythological deity Heracles (Hercules), he is the biological son of King Zeus and Queen Hera of the Greek pantheon. After being drained of his power and made a demigod, Hercules is raised by farmers Amphitryon and Alcmene. Voiced by Josh Keaton as a teenager and Tate Donovan as an adult; singing voice by Roger Bart. |
| Simba | The Lion King franchise | Formerly the prince of the Pride Lands, son of the late King Mufasa and Queen Sarabi, he becomes a new king of the Pride Lands after his father's death. Voiced by Jonathan Taylor Thomas (singing voice by Jason Weaver) as a cub and Matthew Broderick (singing voice by Joseph Williams) as an adult. |
| Prince Eric | The Little Mermaid; The Little Mermaid II: Return to the Sea | He is the human prince who was rescued by the mermaid princess Ariel from a shipwreck and was later married to have a daughter Melody. Voiced by Christopher Daniel Barnes (original) and Rob Paulsen (sequel). |
| Li Shang | Mulan; Mulan II | While in actuality he is neither a prince by birth nor by marriage, Shang is considered one of the Disney Princes though he is the Chinese army captain, son of the late General Li, because his respective love interest Fa Mulan is the member of the official Disney Princess lineup. Voiced by BD Wong (speaking) and Donny Osmond (singing). |
| Prince Jeeki | Mulan II | The son of Lord Qin of Qigong. Voiced by Rob Paulsen. |
| John Smith | Pocahontas | Loosely based on the real-life John Smith. Though not a true prince, John is considered one of the Disney Princes because of Pocahontas, his respective love interest, who is one of the official Disney Princesses to the English. Voiced by Mel Gibson; singing voice by Corey Burton. |
| Prince Mickey | The Prince and the Pauper | He is the mouse prince of England who trades places with the mouse pauper. Both Prince and Pauper were portrayed by a famous Disney character, Mickey Mouse (voiced by Wayne Allwine). |
| Prince Naveen | The Princess and the Frog | He is the prince from the fictional kingdom of Maldonia who moves to New Orleans but gets turned into a frog. Naveen was originally planning to marry Charlotte La Bouff, but was later married to Tiana after breaking the spell. He is inspired by the title character from "The Frog Prince" as well as Prince Eadric from the novel "The Frog Princess", and was voiced by Bruno Campos. |
| Prince John | Robin Hood | Voiced by Peter Ustinov. |
| Prince Phillip | Sleeping Beauty | He is the son and heir of King Hubert and the husband of Princess Aurora. He was named after Prince Philip, Duke of Edinburgh (husband and consort of Queen Elizabeth II), since he was one of the few actual princes familiar to the Disney animators. Originally voiced by Bill Shirley. |
| The Prince | Snow White and the Seven Dwarfs | He is a prince who appears in the first scene where he hears Snow White singing at the wishing well and later reappears to revive her with a kiss. Originally voiced by Harry Stockwell. |
| Arthur Pendragon (Wart) | The Sword in the Stone | Based on the 1938 novel of the same name by T. H. White, Arthur was formerly the prince of England, foster son of Sir Ector, and later king of England; son of the late King Uther Pendragon. Voiced by Rickie Sorensen, Richard and Robert Reitherman. |
| Eugene Fitzherbert (aka Flynn Rider) | Tangled | The animated television series Rapunzel's Tangled Adventure reveals that Flynn Rider is the prince of the Dark Kingdom, orphaned son of King Edmund. He was escorted out of his birthplace by a servant woman who then placed him in an orphanage where he soon grew up to be a thief. |

==== Other ====
| Fictional prince | Film(s) | Notes |
|---|---|---|
| Prince Achmed | The Adventures of Prince Achmed | The eponymous character in the 1926 German film based on a combination of the stories of "The Story of Prince Ahmed and the Fairy Paribanou" and "Aladdin" from One Thousand and One Nights. The oldest surviving animated feature film. |
| Prince Amat | Alakazam the Great | The son of King Amo and Queen Amas. Voiced by Nobuaki Sekine. |
| Frowning Prince | Alice of Wonderland in Paris | 1966 anthology film that includes a brief adaptation of a short story The Frowning Prince by Crockett Johnson. Voiced by Howard Morris. |
| Prince Phillipe Charming | Charming | Voiced by Wilmer Valderrama. |
| Prince Meru | Chō Gekijōban Keroro Gunsō 2: Shinkai no Princess de Arimasu! | He is the prince of Maron, the fictional planet of water. Voiced by Houko Kuwashima. |
| Prince Dev | Dragons: Fire and Ice | Voiced by Mark Hildreth. |
| Prince Ivan | Ivan Tsarevich and the Gray Wolf; Ivan Tsarevich and the Gray Wolf 2; Ivan Tsarevich and the Gray Wolf 3 | Voiced by Nikita Yefremov. |
| Prince Chulalongkorn | The King and I | Loosely on the real-life Chulalongkorn. Voiced by Allen D. Hong; singing voice by David Burnham. |
| Prince Lír | The Last Unicorn | Based on Peter S. Beagle's novel of the same name. Voiced by Jeff Bridges. |
| Prince Dando | Little Insects | Voiced by Gregory Poppen. |
| Little Prince/Mr. Prince | The Little Prince | Based on the 1943 novella of the same name by Antoine de Saint-Exupéry. Voiced by Riley Osborne as a child and Paul Rudd as an adult. |
| Legolas | The Lord of the Rings | Voiced by Anthony Daniels. |
| Asbel (Milo) | Nausicaä of the Valley of the Wind | The twin brother of the deceased Princess Lastelle of Pejite. 1984 anime film by Hayao Miyazaki based on his manga of the same name. In Japanese, he is voiced by Yōji Matsuda. In English, he was dubbed by Cam Clarke in New World Pictures version and then Shia LaBeouf in Disney version. |
| Moses | The Prince of Egypt | Moses was adopted by Pharaoh Seti and Queen Tuya. Based on the biblical figure of Moses; voiced by Val Kilmer (speaking) and Amick Byram (singing). |
| Rameses | The Prince of Egypt | The former prince, and now pharaoh, of Egypt who was the adoptive brother of Moses, the son of Pharaoh Seti and Queen Tuya, and the main antagonist of the film. Based on the biblical figure of Rameses II; voiced by Ralph Fiennes. |
| Ashitaka | Princess Mononoke | He is the last prince of the Emishi tribe. Voiced by Billy Crudup in English and Yōji Matsuda in Japanese. |
| Prince Tutankhaten | La Reine Soleil | Voiced by David Scarpuzza. |
| The Prince | Romeo & Juliet: Sealed with a Kiss | Voiced by Phil Nibbelink. |
| Amin | La Rosa di Bagdad | He marries Princess Zeila. Voiced by Patricia Hayes. |
| Prince Omar | Scooby-Doo! in Where's My Mummy? | Voiced by Ajay Naidu. |
| Prince Sirius | The Sea Prince and the Fire Child | Also known as Syrius in English, he is the son and heir of the Water God Glaucus of the Sea Kingdom. Voiced by Tōru Furuya in Japanese and Tony Oliver in English. |
| Shrek | Shrek | Shrek, the eponymous protagonist of the franchise, becomes the husband of Princess Fiona (only when she becomes an ogre like himself), but still lives in the Swamp with her. Voiced by Mike Myers in the film series and Michael Gough in the video game series. |
| Prince Charming | Shrek 2 | He is one of the main antagonists of the film series. Voiced by Rupert Everett. |
| Two Princes | Sinbad | The two sons of King Jamaal of Salabat. The Golden Films version of the tale of Sinbad the Sailor. |
| Prince Proteus | Sinbad: Legend of the Seven Seas | The prince of Syracuse. Voiced by Joseph Fiennes. |
| Thorp | Smallfoot | The son of the Yeti Village chief called the Stonekeeper; the older brother of Meechee. Voiced by Jimmy Tatro. |
| The Prince | The Snow Queen | Vera Bendina in the 1957 Soviet animated film.; Rowan D'Albert in the 1995 British animated film.; Christopher Corey Smith in the 2012 Russian 3D animated film.; Based on the fairy tale of the same name by Hans Christian Andersen. |
| Ruslan | The Stolen Princess | He marries Princess Mila. Voiced by Oleksiy Zavgorodniy. |
| Prince Derek | The Swan Princess | Voiced by Howard McGillin. |
| Prince Ishitsukuri | The Tale of the Princess Kaguya | Based on the legendary Japanese folklore The Tale of the Bamboo Cutter. Voiced by James Marsden in English and Takaya Kamikawa in Japanese. |
| Prince Kuramochi | The Tale of the Princess Kaguya | Voiced by Beau Bridges in English and Isao Hashizume in Japanese. |
| Prince Lebannen/Arren | Tales from Earthsea | The prince of Enlad and one of the main characters of the film, based on the novel series Earthsea by Ursula K. Le Guin. Voiced by Matt Levin in English and Junichi Okada in Japanese. |
| Tack | The Thief and the Cobbler (The Princess and the Cobbler) | He marries Princess Yum-Yum. Voiced by Steve Lively in the Majestic Films version, and by Matthew Broderick in Miramax version with a singing voice by Steve Lively. |
| Prince Cornelius | Thumbelina | Based on the fairy tale by Hans Christian Andersen, Cornelius is the prince of the Fairies and the son of King Colbert and Queen Tabitha in the 1994 adaption of "Thumbelina", voiced by Gary Imhoff. Other adaptions include: Thumbelina, 1978 anime film featuring Noriko Ohara as the Prince of Tulips.; The Adventures of Tom Thumb and Thumbelina, starring Elijah Wood as Tom Thumb/Horace. |
| Prince Cooper | Trolls; Trolls World Tour | He is a giraffe-like rap-playing troll who is the long-lost prince of the Funk Trolls, the son of King Quincy and Queen Essence and the twin brother of Prince D. Voiced by Ron Funches. |
| King Gristle Jr. | Trolls; Trolls World Tour | He was formerly the prince of the Bergens in the beginning of the first film. Voiced by Christopher Mintz-Plasse. |
| Pierre | The Wonderful World of Puss 'n Boots | Voiced by Jack Grimes in English and Toshiko Fujita in Japanese. |

== Television ==
=== Live action ===
| Fictional prince | Series title | Notes |
|---|---|---|
| Prince Arthur | The Adventures of Robin Hood | Based on the historical Arthur I, Duke of Brittany. Portrayed by Peter Asher (three episodes, series 1 & 2), Richard O'Sullivan (one episode, series 3) and Jonathon Bailey (one episode, series 4) |
| Prince John | The Adventures of Robin Hood | Portrayed by Donald Pleasence, Hubert Gregg, and Brian Haines. |
| Princes of Aragon | BBC Television Shakespeare | Don Pedro, portrayed by Jon Finch.; Don John, portrayed by Vernon Dobtcheff.; They both appeared in the episode "Much Ado About Nothing". |
| Prince Escalus | BBC Television Shakespeare | Portrayed by Laurence Naismith in the episode "Romeo & Juliet". |
| Prince Ferdinand | BBC Television Shakespeare | Portrayed by Christopher Guard in the episode "The Tempest". |
| Crown Prince Fortinbras | BBC Television Shakespeare | Portrayed by Ian Charleson in the episode "Hamlet, Prince of Denmark". |
| Prince Hamlet | BBC Television Shakespeare | Portrayed by Derek Jacobi in the episode "Hamlet, Prince of Denmark". |
| Prince Othello | BBC Television Shakespeare | Portrayed by Anthony Hopkins in the episode "Othello". |
| Prince Pericles | BBC Television Shakespeare | Portrayed by Mike Gwilym in the episode "Pericles, Prince of Tyre". |
| Prince Yubi | Benji, Zax & the Alien Prince | The crown prince and rightful heir of the fictional planet of Antars. Portrayed by Christopher Burton. |
| George | Blackadder | Based on the historical George IV. Portrayed by Hugh Laurie. |
| Prince Ludwig the Indestructible | Blackadder | Portrayed by Hugh Laurie in the episode "Chains". |
| Prince Dakkar/Nana Sagib/Captain Nemo | Captain Nemo | 1975 miniseries loosely based on Jules Verne's classic novels Twenty Thousand Leagues Under the Seas, The Mysterious Island and The Steam House. Portrayed by Vladislav Dvorzhetsky. |
| Prince Buldont/Sprocket | Chōriki Sentai Ohranger/Power Rangers Zeo | He is the son of Emperor Bacchus Wrath/King Mondo and Empress Hysteria/Queen Machina of the Machine Empire Baranoia. Voiced by Tomokazu Seki in Chōriki Sentai Ohranger and Barbara Goodson in Power Rangers Zeo. |
| Prince Michael | Dynasty | He is the heir of the European kingdom of Moldavia who has been arranged to marry Amanda Carrington, although he was originally in relationship to Duchess Elena. However, their wedding was intervened by a political coup in attempt to kill Michael's father, King Galen. Prince Michael was portrayed by Michael Praed. |
| Junior Gorg | Fraggle Rock | He is the self-proclaimed prince and heir-apparent of the "Universe" with his parents as its king and queen. Performed by Richard Hunt. |
| Farad'n | Frank Herbert's Children of Dune | The son of Princess Wensicia. 2003 miniseries based on the Dune novels by Frank Herbert. Portrayed by Jonathan Büün. |
| Prince Harry | Galavant | Prince of Hortensia. Portrayed by Kemaal Deen-Ellis. |
| Joffrey Baratheon | Game of Thrones | He was formerly the Crown Prince of the Seven Kingdoms, legal son of King Robert Baratheon and biological son of Cersei and Jaime Lannister; older brother of Tommen and Myrcella Baratheon. He becomes the king of the Seven Kingdoms after his legal father's death. Based on A Song of Ice and Fire novel series. Portrayed by Jack Gleeson. |
| Tommen Baratheon | Game of Thrones | He is the younger brother of Joffrey and Myrcella Baratheon and the husband of Margaery Tyrell. Portrayed by Callum Wharry (seasons 1–2) and Dean-Charles Chapman (seasons 4–6). |
| Theon Greyjoy | Game of Thrones | He is the son of King Balon Greyjoy of the Iron Islands. Portrayed by Alfie Allen. |
| Doran Martell | Game of Thrones | He is the prince of Dorne. Portrayed by Alexander Siddig. |
| Oberyn Martell (aka Red Viper) | Game of Thrones | He is the younger brother of Prince Doran and Princess Elia Martell. Portrayed by Pedro Pascal. |
| Trystane Martell | Game of Thrones | He is the son of Prince Doran Martell and is betrothed to Myrcella Baratheon. Portrayed by Toby Sebastian. |
| Rhaegar Targaryen | Game of Thrones | He was the heir apparent to the Iron Throne of the Targaryen dynasty, first son of King Aerys II Targaryen and older brother of Viserys and Daenerys Targaryen; the husband of Princess Elia Martell. Portrayed by Wilf Scolding. |
| Viserys III Targaryen | Game of Thrones | He was formerly the exiled prince and the heir of the Targaryen dynasty, second son of King Aerys II Targaryen and middle brother of Rhaegar and Daenerys Targaryen. Portrayed by Harry Lloyd. |
| Nikolas Cassadine | General Hospital | He is the prince of Russia, the son of Prince Stavros Cassadine and Laura Spencer and the father of Prince Spencer Cassadine. |
| Prince Otto | Genie in the House | A character appeared in the episode "Princess Emma", portrayed by Nathan Guy. |
| Richard Winslow | Guiding Light | He is the prince of the island of San Cristobel. Portrayed by Bradley Cole. |
| Prince Munodi | Gulliver's Travels | The son of Empress Munodi. 1996 miniseries based on the novel of the same name by Jonathan Swift. Portrayed by Navin Chowdhry as a guest star. |
| Ka Suo | Ice Fantasy | The most powerful prince of the Ice Tribe and one of the main characters of the series. Portrayed by Feng Shaofeng. |
| Li Guang | Ice Fantasy | The second prince of the Ice Tribe. Portrayed by He Xiang. |
| Shang Lie | Ice Fantasy | The crown prince of the Ice Tribe. Portrayed by Huang Shengchi. |
| Shuo Gang | Ice Fantasy | The crown prince of the Fire Tribe. Portrayed by Shu Yaxin. |
| Xin Jue | Ice Fantasy | The second prince of the Fire Tribe. Portrayed by Jiang Chao. |
| Ying Kong Shi | Ice Fantasy | Ka Suo's younger half-brother who wants to replace him as the king of the Ice Tribe to set him free. Portrayed by Ma Tianyu. |
| Zhu Gong | Ice Fantasy | The eldest prince of the Ice Tribe. Portrayed by Zhang Ziwen. |
| Prince Lee Jae-ha | The King 2 Hearts | He is the Crown Prince, and later King, of South Korea, the second son of Queen Bang Yang-seon and the middle brother of King Lee Jae-kang and Princess Lee Jae-shin. Portrayed by Kang Han-byeol as a child and Lee Seung-gi as a young man. |
| Crown Prince Yi Chang | Kingdom | Crown prince of the Joseon dynasty. Based on the webcomic series The Kingdom of the Gods by Kim Eun-hee. Portrayed by Ju Ji-hoon. |
| Jonathan "Jack" Benjamin | Kings | Crown Prince of Gilboa and son of King Silas. Portrayed by Sebastian Stan. |
| Prince Fyren | Legend of the Seeker | The High Prince of Kelton. Portrayed by Toby Leonard Moore in Season 2, Episode 11 "Torn". Based on the novel series The Sword of Truth by Terry Goodkind. |
| Prince Iridian | The Letter for the King | Based on the Dutch novel of the same name. Portrayed by Jakob Oftebro. |
| Prince Viridian | The Letter for the King | Portrayed by Gijs Blom. |
| King Arthur Pendragon | Merlin | He was formerly the prince of Camelot, the son of Uther and Ygraine Pendragon and half-brother of Lady Morgana Pendragon. Portrayed by Bradley James. |
| Prince Tuesday | Mister Rogers' Neighborhood | The prince of the Neighborhood of Make-Believe and the son of King Friday XIII and Queen Sara Saturday. He was performed as a hand puppet character. |
| Prince Ivar | Mystic Knights of Tir Na Nog | Mystic Knight of Water. Portrayed by Justin Pierre. |
| Prince George | The Palace | He is the son of the widowed Queen Charlotte and the late King James III; the brother of King Richard IV and Princesses Eleanor and Isabelle. Portrayed by Sebastian Armesto. |
| King Richard IV | The Palace | He was formerly Prince Richard of Wales until his father, King James III, suddenly dies in the first episode. Portrayed by Rupert Evans. |
| Prince Colin | Power Rangers Dino Charge | He was prince of the fictional small country of Zander. Portrayed by Josh Masterton. |
| Prince Phillip III | Power Rangers Dino Charge | He is the descendant of Prince Colin and the Dino Charge Graphite Ranger. Portrayed by Jarred Blakiston. |
| Prince Olympius ("Impus") | Power Rangers Lightspeed Rescue | He is the prince of the demons and the son of Queen Bansheera. Voiced by Brianne Siddall as an infant and Michael Forest as an adult. |
| Prince Vekar | Power Rangers Megaforce | The primary fleet leader of the Armada and the older son of Emperor Mavro. Voiced by Stephen Butterworth. |
| Prince Vrak | Power Rangers Megaforce | The second son of Emperor Mavro and younger brother of Prince Vekar. Voiced by Jason Hood. |
| Prince Gasket | Power Rangers Zeo | The first-built son of King Mondo and Queen Machina of the Machine Empire and the older brother of Prince Sprocket. Voiced by Douglas Sloan. |
| Prince E'Hawke/Matthew Star | The Powers of Matthew Star | He is the crown prince from the Tau Ceti planet of Quadris who acts like a typical teenager when living on planet Earth. Portrayed by Peter Barton. |
| Prince Caspian | Prince Caspian/The Voyage of the Dawn Treader | The former prince, and later king, of Narnia. Portrayed by Jean Marc Perret (teenager) and Samuel West (adult). |
| Prince Lee Hoo/Kang Hoo | Prince Hours | A spin-off of the 2006 series Princess Hours. Portrayed by Seven. |
| Prince Lee Joon | Prince Hours | Portrayed by Kang Doo. |
| Prince Maxemil "Emil" Vanderklaut III | Prince of Peoria | He is the prince of Buronia and the main character of the series. Portrayed by Gavin Lewis. |
| King Anand Wangchuck | Princess and I | He was formerly Prince Anand of Yangdon, son of the late King Majaraja Wangchuck in the first episode "A Princess is born". Portrayed by Albert Martinez. |
| Prince Jan Alfonso "Jao" Rinpoche | Princess and I | The son of Ashi Behati Rinpoche and one of the main characters of the show. Portrayed by Enrique Gil. |
| Prince Goldy | Princess Dollie Aur Uska Magic Bag | Portrayed by Sharad Malhotra. |
| Crown Prince Lee Shin | Princess Hours | 2006 South Korean television series based on the manhwa Goong. Portrayed by Ju Ji-hoon. |
| Prince Lee Yul | Princess Hours | The son of Prince Lee Soo and Lady Hwa-young. Portrayed by Kim Jeong-hoon. |
| Tuoba Jun | The Princess Weiyoung | The prince of Northern Wei and the son of the deceased Crown Prince Tuoba Huang and the Crown Princess. Based on the historical figure of Emperor Wencheng. Portrayed by Luo Jin. |
| Tuoba Yu | The Princess Weiyoung | The villainous prince whose greatest ambition is to become the emperor to rule the world. Based on the historical figure of Tuoba Yu. Portrayed by Vanness Wu. |
| Prince Rilian | The Silver Chair | Prince of Narnia and the son of King Caspian. Played by Richard Henders. |
| Hongxiao, Prince Yi | Story of Yanxi Palace | The cousin of Emperor Qianlong of the Qing dynasty. Portrayed by Cheng Junwen. |
| Hongzhou, Prince He | Story of Yanxi Palace | The brother of Emperor Qianlong. Based on the historical Hongzhou, portrayed by Hong Yao. |
| Yongcheng, Prince Lü | Story of Yanxi Palace | The fourth son of Emperor Qianlong and the surrogate son of Empress Hoifa-Nara Shushen. Portrayed by Fang Yangfei. |
| Yongcong, Prince Zhe | Story of Yanxi Palace | The seventh son of Emperor Qianlong. He died at a young age. Portrayed by Zhou Yicheng. |
| Yongqi, Prince Rong | Story of Yanxi Palace | The fifth son of Emperor Qianlong and the surrogate son of Wei Yingluo, Consort Ling. Based on the historical Yongqi, portrayed by Chen Youwei. |
| Yuntao, Prince Lü | Story of Yanxi Palace | Portrayed by Gong Fangmin. |
| Prince Aethelwulf | Vikings | The son of King Ecbert of Wessex. He is the husband of Princess Judith of Northumbria and the father of Prince Aethelred. Based on the historical Æthelwulf of Wessex. Portrayed by Moe Dunford. |
| Prince Ari | Vikings | The younger son of King Horik. Portrayed by Jay Duffy. |
| Prince Burgred | Vikings | Based on the historical Burgred of Mercia. Portrayed by Aaron Monaghan. |
| Prince Egbert | Vikings | The son of King Aelle and Queen Ealhswith. Portrayed by Sean Treacy. |
| Prince Erlendur | Vikings | He is the first son of King Horik and Ari's older brother. Portrayed by Edvin Endre. |
| Eerde | A Weaver on the Horizon | A Mongol prince. Portrayed by Lou Yejiang. |
| Prince Hector of Bulgaria | Year of the Rabbit | He is the prince and heir to the throne of Bulgaria who has been taken captive by his sister Princess Juliana. Portrayed by Matthew Holness. |

=== Animation ===
| Fictional prince | Series title | Notes |
|---|---|---|
| Prince Schwann | ACCA: 13-Territory Inspection Dept. | He is the prince and heir to the throne of the Dowa Kingdom. Voiced by Mamoru Miyano in Japanese and Daman Mills in English. |
| Prince Uncouthma | Aladdin | He is the ruler of the barbarian land of Odiferous who was originally a suitor of Princess Jasmine until he is married to a woman named Brawnhilda to have a son, Bud. Voiced by Tino Insana. |
| Prince Barty | All Hail King Julien | A ring-tailed lemur who becomes the prince of the Lemur Kingdom in Madagascar as the husband of Princess Julienne and the father of King Julien XIII. Voiced by John Michael Higgins. |
| Prince Zuko | Avatar: The Last Airbender | He is the prince, and later Fire Lord, of the Fire Nation. Also notice that his father, the late Fire Lord Ozai, was originally a prince during his childhood. |
| Iroh | Avatar: The Last Airbender | Former crown prince of the Fire Nation before being usurped by his brother Ozai. |
| Prince Hydron | Bakugan Battle Brawlers | The prince of Vestal, commander of the Vexos, and the son of King Zenoheld. Voiced by Lyon Smith (English) and Sōichirō Hoshi (Japanese). |
| Soma Asman Kadar | Black Butler | The Indian prince of Bengal. Voiced by Shinnosuke Tachibana in Japanese and Christopher Ayres in English. |
| Lumiere Silvamillion Clover | Black Clover | Lumiere is the former human prince, and later named the first Wizard King, of the Clover Kingdom. Voiced by Syu Hikari in Japanese and Chris Burnett in English. |
| Lelouch vi Britannia | Code Geass | The former prince of the Holy Britannian Empire and the main protagonist of the series. Voiced by Jun Fukuyama (Japanese) and Johnny Yong Bosch (English). |
| Odysseus eu Britannia | Code Geass | The First Prince of the Holy Britannian Empire and the first older brother of Lelouch. Voiced by Jin Yamanoi (Japanese) and Peter Emshwiller (English). |
| Schneizel el Britannia | Code Geass | The Second Prince of the Holy Britannian Empire and the Prime Minister of Britannia; the second older brother of Lelouch. Voiced by Norihiro Inoue (Japanese) and Troy Baker (English). |
| Julio Asuka Misurugi | Cross Ange | He is formerly the prince of the Empire of Misurugi who executes his father Emperor Jurai, following the death of his mother Empress Sophia, and exiles his middle sister Princess Ange to the island of Arzenal as he exposes her as a "Norma" to claim the throne for himself as the new emperor. Voiced by Kōsuke Toriumi in Japanese and Blake Shepard in English. |
| Vegeta IV | Dragon Ball | He is the last prince of the Saiyans and the son of King Vegeta III. In the anime featurette Yo! Son Goku and His Friends Return!!, Vegeta has a younger brother named Tarble. |
| Mark Chang | The Fairly OddParents | He is the alien prince of the planet Yugopotamia. Voiced by Rob Paulsen. |
| Mystogan | Fairy Tail | Mystogan is one of the S-Class wizards as well as the former prince of Edolas, the son of King Faust. He succeeds his father as the new king of Edolas. |
| Hard-to-Hit | Fox's Peter Pan & the Pirates | The tribal prince of the Native Americans in Neverland; the son of Chief Great Big Little Panther and the younger brother of Tiger Lily. An animated series that aired on Fox based on the original story of Peter Pan by J. M. Barrie. Voiced by Aaron Lohr. |
| Lin Yao | Fullmetal Alchemist: Brotherhood | He is the prince of the fictional country of Xing and the half-brother of Princess May Chang. Voiced by Todd Haberkorn in English and Mamoru Miyano in Japanese. |
| Pollun | Futari wa Pretty Cure | Also known as Porun in the English dub, he is the Prince of the Garden of Light and the older brother of Princess Lulun. |
| Pandat | Galtar and the Golden Lance | The prince of the Nerms. Voiced by Don Messick. |
| Zorn | Galtar and the Golden Lance | The mind-controlling brother of Princess Goleeta; the former prince of Bandisar. Voiced by David Mendenhall. |
| Prince Malcolm | Gargoyles | The son of Malcolm I of Scotland, brother of King Kenneth and the father of Princess Katharine. Voiced by Roger Rees. |
| Zorzal El Caesar | Gate | The villainous prince of the Empire and the main antagonist of the series; the older half-brother of Princess Piña Co Lada. Voiced by Kregg Daily (English) and Katsuyuki Konishi (Japanese). |
| Wein Salema Arbalest | The Genius Prince's Guide to Raising a Nation Out of Debt | He is the crown prince and capable heir of the Kingdom of Natra who is lauded as a genius but actually plots to sell his kingdom. He is the son of the late King Natra Owen and older brother of Princess Falanya. Voiced by Soma Saito in Japanese and Dallas Reid in English. |
| Earthworld Princes | The Genius Prince's Guide to Raising a Nation Out of Debt | They are the three princes of the Earthworld Empire and three brothers of Princess Lowellmina.: Demetrio Earthworld, the eldest and arrogant prince, voiced by Ryūichi Kijima.; Bardloche Earthworld, the middle prince, voiced by Kenichirou Matsuda.; Manfred Earthworld, the youngest prince, voiced by Kengo Kawanishi. |
| Prince Kanata | Go! Princess PreCure | Full name Prince Hope Grand Kanata. He is the crown prince of the Hope Kingdom and the brother of Towa Akagi. |
| Holdem | Grimoire of Zero | He is a wolf-like Beastfallen who is formerly the prince but runs away from his family to live with the Mooncaller witch, Sorena. Voiced by Masayuki Kato in Japanese and David Wald in English. |
| Prince Norman | Grizzly Tales for Gruesome Kids | Based on the book series of the same name by Jamie Rix. Voiced by Nigel Planer. |
| Prince Spencer | Grizzly Tales for Gruesome Kids | Voiced by Nigel Planer. |
| Remus Farseer | Guin Saga | The crown prince of Parros, and the son of King Aldross III, who along with his twin sister Crown Princess Rinda allies with the mysterious, amnesiac warrior Guin. He is voiced by Tsubasa Yonaga in Japanese and Blake Shepard in English. |
| Serge Flora | Hana no Ko Lunlun | He is the prince of the Flower Star and a photographer who cedes the throne to his younger brother to live on Earth and marry Lunlun. Voiced by Yū Mizushima. |
| Prince Adam ("He-Man") | He-Man and the Masters of the Universe; The New Adventures of He-Man; Masters of the Universe: Revelation | The prince of Eternia; son of King Randor and Queen Marlena and twin brother of Princess Adora. |
| Xie Lian | Heaven Official's Blessing | He is the crown prince from the Xian Le kingdom who ascends to Heaven at least thrice and eventually reveals to be gay due to his love for a mysterious ghost king, Hua Cheng. Voiced by Jiang Guangtao in the original Chinese and Howard Wang in English dub. |
| Arslan | The Heroic Legend of Arslan | He is the Crown Prince of Pars, son of King Andragoras III and Queen Tahamine and the main protagonist of the series. Voiced by Aaron Dismuke in English and Yūsuke Kobayashi in Japanese. |
| Hilmes/Silvermask | The Heroic Legend of Arslan | He is the leader of the army in Lusitania, and the main antagonist of the series, who was formerly the Prince of Pars, the son of former King Osroes and the cousin of Prince Arslan. Voiced by Vic Mignogna in English and Yuki Kaji in Japanese. |
| Rajendra | The Heroic Legend of Arslan | The younger son of King Karikala II, he is made Crown Prince of Shindra following the arrest of his older half-brother Prince Gadevi. Voiced by Ian Sinclair in English and Kousuke Toriumi in Japanese. |
| Julius Amidonia | How a Realist Hero Rebuilt the Kingdom | The exiled prince of the former Principality of Amidonia who was meant to become its ruler but has been driven out of his country as rebellions rise up. He is the son of the late Prince Gaius Amidonia and the older brother of Princess Roroa Amidonia. Voiced by Kenji Nojima in Japanese and David Matranga in English. |
| Pierre Bichelberger | The iDOLM@STER SideM | He is a bright and innocent prince from the European country, probably Belgium or Luxembourg, who goes to Japan and works as a frog mascot at an amusement park due to a throne dispute between his two older brothers, making it unsafe for him to stay in his country anymore. Voiced by Shun Horie. |
| Lord Nabokov Jugglaburk | Ixion Saga DT | The prince of Jugglaburk who is to be married to the little princess Ecarlate for peace but is a rather bizarre manchild with a fetish for dolls and stuffed animals. Voiced by Kōji Yusa. |
| Prince Cuthbert Hakan Kippernook | Jane and the Dragon | Based on the book series of the same name by Martin Baynton. Voiced by Cameron Ansell. |
| Prince Wally the Third | Kim Possible | The arrogant prince of Rodeghan. Voiced by Rob Paulsen. |
| Prince Cherry | Kinnikuman | He is the prince of Planet Kinmoku and the younger brother of Princess Lily. Voiced by Hiromi Tsuru. |
| Prince Kamehame | Kinnikuman | He was the prince from Planet Coconuts who traveled to Earth to become the Hawaiian Champion and a veteran Choujin until he was later killed by Sunshine when protecting Terryman. Voiced by Masaharu Satō. |
| Prince Nata | Kirakira PreCure a la Mode | The flamboyant prince of Confetto who attempts to flirt with Yukari Kotozume. He appeared in the episode "Lightning Fast Wedding!? Princess Yukari!" and was voiced by Kohsuke Toriumi. |
| Wolfram von Bielefeld | Kyo Kara Maoh! | The youngest son of the former Demon Queen Cecilie von Spitzweg of The Demon Kingdom and the younger half-brother of Gwendal von Voltaire and Conrart Weller. Voiced by Mitsuki Saiga in Japanese and Mona Marshall in English. |
| Prince StrongHeart | Lady Lovely Locks | He was originally a human but was cursed as a dog. He was soon adopted by a wizard, Shining Glory. Voiced by Danny Mann. |
| Villagulio De Metrio Lu | Lagrange: The Flower of Rin-ne | He is the former prince of De Metrio, and the older brother of Princess Yurikano, who forms the rebellious organization KISS and is in the close relationship with Muginami after being thrown into her home planet. Voiced by Yuichi Nakamura in Japanese and Keith Silverstein in English. |
| Prince Desna | The Legend of Korra | Son of Chief Unalaq of the Northern Water Tribe and twin brother of Princess Eska; the cousin of Avatar Korra. |
| Prince Wu | The Legend of Korra | The great-nephew of the late Earth Queen Hou-Ting and the great-grandson of Earth King Kuei. He is the sovereign of the Earth Kingdom who is meant to be a crowned King but abolishes the monarchy in favor of independent states with democratically elected leaders. |
| Prince Michael | The Legend of Prince Valiant | The prince, and later king, of Northland and the nephew of the Duke of Lionsgate. Voiced by Wil Wheaton. |
| Prince Valiant | The Legend of Prince Valiant | The exiled prince of Thule and the eponymous protagonist of the series. Voiced by Robby Benson. |
| Prince Richard | The Legend of Snow White | The prince of Albertville. Italian-Japanese anime series. Voiced by Takehito Koyasu. |
| Prince Façade | The Legend of Zelda | He is the prince of Arcadia who only appeared in the episode "The White Knight". Based on the video game series of the same name. |
| Prince Chris ("Wish") | Lilpri | The son of the Queen of Fairyland. Voiced by Tetsuya Kakihara. |
| Kion | The Lion Guard | He is the prince of the Pride Lands, the leader of the Lion Guard and the main protagonist of the series; the son of King Simba and Queen Nala and the younger brother of Kiara. Voiced by Max Charles. |
| Prince Ferg | Little Charmers | He was originally a normal prince but was turned into a frog. Inspired by the character of The Frog Prince. |
| Little Prince | The Little Prince | There are multiple animated TV series adaptation of Antoine de Saint-Exupéry's classic novella: The Adventures of the Little Prince, 1978 Japanese anime series featuring Taiki Matsuno.; Le Petit Prince, 2010 French computer-animated series featuring Gabriel Bismuth-Bienaimé. |
| Prince Borch | The Little Troll Prince | The two-headed younger brother of Bu. Voiced by Rob Paulsen (right head) and Laurie Faso (left head). |
| Crown Prince Bu | The Little Troll Prince | The gnome prince and the first son of two-headed King Ulvik and Queen Sirena. Voiced by Danny Cooksey. |
| Prince Prag | The Little Troll Prince | Two-headed younger brother of Bu. Voiced by Neil Ross (right head) and Frank Welker (left head). |
| Iselus El-Arde Corwen | Log Horizon | He is a member of the Corwen clan in the League of Freedom Cities Eastal; the princeling of Maihama. Voiced by Mariya Ise in Japanese and Kalin Coats in English. |
| Jodan | LoliRock | He is the Prince of Volta. |
| Rudo Bernstein IV | Lost Song | The cunning and cold-hearted prince of the kingdom of Golt, and the brother of Princess Alea/Pony, who desires to use Finis as a human weapon to win the war. Voiced by Yuto Suzuki in Japanese and Todd Haberkorn in English. |
| Heinz Nerich Windermere | Macross Delta | The young prince of the Windermere Kingdom, and the son of late King Grammier VI, who as the "Wind Singer" is the main source of the Vár Syndrome. He later becomes the new king of the Windermere Kingdom upon his father's death. Voiced by Yuka Terasaki; singing voice by Melody Chubak. |
| Keith Aero Windermere | Macross Delta | The leader of the Aerial Knights in the Windermere Kingdom, who holds the distinctive title of "White Knight of Derwent" but is actually the illegitimate son of the late King Grammier and the older half-brother of Prince Heinz. Voiced by Ryōhei Kimura. |
| Aladdin | Magi: The Labyrinth of Magic | He is the son of King Solomon and Queen Sheba and the former prince of Alma Torran. Voiced by Erica Mendez (English) Kaori Ishihara (Japanese). |
| Alibaba Saluja | Magi: The Labyrinth of Magic | He has been taken by his father, the King, as the third prince of Balbadd after his mother's death. Voiced by Erik Scott Kimerer (English) and Yūki Kaji (Japanese). |
| Mystras Leoxses | Magi: The Labyrinth of Magic | He was first prince of Sasan and the older son of Knight King Darius Leoxses. Voiced by Robbie Daymond (English) and Wataru Hatano (Japanese). |
| Spartos Leoxses | Magi: The Labyrinth of Magic | He is originally the second prince, and later king, of Sasan and the younger brother of Mystras. Voiced by Sam Riegel (English) and Wataru Hatano (Japanese). |
| Princes of the Kou Empire | Magi: The Labyrinth of Magic | Kouen Ren, voiced by Kaiji Tang (English) and Yuichi Nakamura (Japanese); Koumei Ren, Voiced by Ethan Murray (English) and Satoshi Hino (Japanese); Kouha Ren, voiced by Mark Allen Jr. (English) and Tetsuya Kakihara (Japanese); Hakuryuu Ren, voiced by Darrel Guilbeau (English) and Kenshō Ono (Japanese) |
| Prince Ferio | Magic Knight Rayearth | He is the younger brother of Princess Emeraude of Cephiro. |
| Kaito Domoto | Mermaid Melody Pichi Pichi Pitch | He is the prince from an ancient water clan known as Panthalassa. Voiced by Daisuke Kishio. |
| Mike Alfred | Mike the Knight | Mike is the young prince who wants to be a knight, though he is still a knight-in-training. He is the son of King Norg (also the knight) and Queen Martha and the older brother of Princess Evie. Voiced by Jake Beale and Trek Buccino in North America and Benjamin Baker in the United Kingdom. |
| Prince Rygan | Miles from Tomorrowland | The son of Queen Gemma of the Dethalians. Voiced by Rio Mangini. |
| Prince Neel | Mira, Royal Detective | He is the second prince of the fictional Indian kingdom of Jalpur, second son of Queen Shanti. Voiced by Kamran Lucas. |
| Crown Prince Veer | Mira, Royal Detective | He is the first prince and heir apparent of the kingdom of Jalpur, older brother of Prince Neel and first son of Queen Shanti. Voiced by Karan Brar. |
| Milliardo Peacecraft/Zechs Merquise | Mobile Suit Gundam Wing | Voiced by Brian Drummond (English) and Takehito Koyasu (Japanese). |
| Prince Blueblood | My Little Pony: Friendship Is Magic | A unicorn prince who is an object of Rarity's affection but proves that he is a "pompous fool" and "quite vain". He is the distant nephew of Princess Celestia and Princess Luna of Equestria and the cousin of Princess Cadance. Voiced by Vincent Tong. |
| Prince Rutherford | My Little Pony: Friendship Is Magic | He is a temperamental yak who is the prince of the Yakyakistan kingdom. Voiced by Garry Chalk. |
| Shining Armor | My Little Pony: Friendship Is Magic | The captain of the Canterlot royal guard, Shining Armor is married to Princess Cadance to become a ruler of the Crystal Empire. He is the father of Princess Flurry Heart and the older brother of Twilight Sparkle. Voiced by Andrew Francis. |
| Prince Alan Stuart | My Next Life as a Villainess: All Routes Lead to Doom! | Voiced by Tatsuhisa Suzuki in Japanese and Bryce Papenbrook in English. |
| Prince Geordo Stuart | My Next Life as a Villainess: All Routes Lead to Doom! | Voiced by Shouta Aoi in Japanese and Griffin Burns in English. |
| Ojarumaru Sakanoue | Ojarumaru | He is the five-year-old prince from the Heian-era Fairy World and the eponymous character of the series. Voiced by Hiroko Konishi (Series 1–3) and Chinami Nishimura (Series 4–present). |
| Neptune Brothers | One Piece | The three princes of the Ryugu Kingdom, three sons of King Neptune and the late Queen Otohime, and the brothers of Mermaid Princess Shirahoshi.: Fukaboshi, the eldest son; Ryuboshi, the middle son; Manboshi, the youngest son |
| Vinsmoke Princes | One Piece | The four princes of the Germa Kingdom, four brothers of Princess Reiju and four sons of King Judge and Queen Sora.: Vinsmoke Sanji, the former prince; Vinsmoke Ichiji; Vinsmoke Niji; Vinsmoke Yonji |
| Prince Sorara | Onegai My Melody | He is the 13-year-old prince from the Star Kingdom who transforms into a small chick and visits Mary Land after the Wishing Star got crashed and scattered to pieces. Voiced by Kōki Miyata. |
| Barbro Vaiself | Overlord | Barbro Andrean Ield Ryle Vaiself, the crown prince of the Re-Estize Kingdom, the first son of King Ramposa III and the older brother of Prince Zanac and Princess Renner. Voiced by Newton Pittman in English and Taiten Kusunoki in Japanese. |
| Zanac Vaiself | Overlord | Zanac Valleon Igana Ryle Vaiself, the second prince of the Re-Estize Kingdom and the middle brother of Barbro and Princess Renner; the younger son of King Ramposa III. Voiced by Cris George in English and Kouji Fujiyoshi in Japanese. |
| Prince Arrow/Arc | Petite Princess Yucie | He is a prince in disguise whose mother Queen Ercell is the principal of the Princess Academy. Voiced by Takayuki Yamaguchi in Japanese and Joey Hood in English. |
| Prince Ren | The Pirates of Dark Water | He is the prince of the Octopon Kingdom, and the son of the late King Primus, who goes on a quest to find the lost Thirteen Treasures of Rule. Voiced by George Newbern. |
| Prince Kogoto | Popolocrois | He is the adpoptive son of GamiGami Maou and the older brother of Princess PunPun, who builds a robot and plans world conquest in the second series. Voiced by Koki Miyata. |
| Pietro PakaPuka | Popolocrois | He is the crown prince, and later king, of Popolocrois who is a main hero in the first series; the son of King Paulo and Sania. Voiced by Ai Orikasa as a child and Akio Ōtsuka as an adult. |
| Pinon PakaPuka | Popolocrois | He is the new prince of Popolocrois, and the son of King Pietro and Queen Narcia, who is a main hero in the second series. Voiced by Omi Minami. |
| Akata | The Prince of Atlantis | The last Atlantean prince who has to save his city from modern technologies. |
| Prince Franz | Princess Sissi | Voiced by Terrence Scammell. |
| Prince Karl | Princess Sissi | Voiced by Jacob Tierney. |
| Prince Mytho | Princess Tutu | Voiced by Naoki Yanagi in Japanese and Jay Hickman in English. |
| Prince Badjura XVII | Psychic Squad | He is the crown prince of the Kingdom of Impalahem who The Children of B.A.B.E.L. are tasked to assist him in freeing his lover Sera the priestess from being possessed by her grandmother Masara. He appeared in one episode "Marital Vows! His Majesty and The Children" and was voiced by Daisuke Ono. |
| Prince Bojji | Ranking of Kings | Bojji is a young prince who is deaf and barely able to speak. He is the older half-brother of King Daida and the son of former King Boss. Voiced by Minami Hinata in Japanese and Emily Fajardo in English. |
| Belphegor | Reborn! | Also known as "Prince the Ripper", he was once a prince and is an assassin working for the Varia. Voiced by Yūki Fujiwara. |
| Rasiel | Reborn! | Belphegor's older twin brother who states that he is a king, rather than a prince. Voiced by Ryuji Kamiyama. |
| Prince Dios/Akio Ohtori | Revolutionary Girl Utena | He was formerly the prince in his early life before becoming the chairman of Ohtori Academy where his younger sister Anthy Himemiya is the "Rose Bride". There is also an anime film, Adolescence of Utena. |
| Romeo Candore De Montague | Romeo × Juliet | The crown prince and heir to the throne of Neo Verona and the son of Lord Leontes Montague and Lady Portia. Voiced by Takahiro Mizushima (Japanese) and Chris Burnett (English). |
| Prince Endymion ("Tuxedo Mask") | Sailor Moon; Sailor Moon Crystal | He is the prince of the Kingdom of Earth. In the future, he becomes King Endymion of Crystal Tokyo as the husband of Neo-Queen Serenity and the father of Chibiusa. |
| Prince Demand/Diamond | Sailor Moon; Sailor Moon Crystal | He is the leader of the Black Moon Clan. |
| Saphir/Sapphire | Sailor Moon; Sailor Moon Crystal | Although he never actually held the title of "prince", he is one of the members of the Black Moon Clan and the younger brother of Prince Demand (Diamond). |
| Kyle Salutania | The Saint's Magic Power is Omnipotent | He is the crown prince of the Kingdom of Salutania and the senior at the Royal Academy. Voiced by Jun Fukuyama in Japanese and Adam McArthur in English. |
| Rain Salutania | The Saint's Magic Power is Omnipotent | He is the second prince of the Kingdom of Salutania, and Kyle's younger brother, who is a junior at the Royal Academy. Voiced by Aoi Ichikawa in Japanese and Justin Briner in English. |
| Ukyo | Samurai 7 | The self-proclaimed heir to the throne of Ayamaro. Voiced by Anthony Bowling in English and Takehito Koyasu in Japanese. |
| Samurai Jack | Samurai Jack | Jack is the samurai prince from feudal Japan, the biological son of the Emperor and the Empress and the titular protagonist of the series. He was raised by several tribes in a variety of skills to fight against the demon lord Aku. Voiced by Phil LaMarr. |
| Sandokan | Sandokan | Based on the novels by Emilio Salgari, Sandokan is an anthropomorphic tiger who is the usurped Bornean prince. He also appears in the 1995 animated film adaptation The Princess and the Pirate, voiced by Stuart Organ. |
| Prince Keppi | Sarazanmai | He is the prince of the Kappa Kingdom whose shirikodama is split into two after the victory of the Otter Empire. Voiced by Junichi Suwabe in Japanese and Tyler Walker in English. |
| The Prince | Scooby-Doo! in Arabian Nights | He is the Arabian prince and the love interest of Aliyah-Din in the gender-bent version of "Aladdin". Voiced by Rob Paulsen. |
| Prince Forsyth | Scrapped Princess | The crown prince of the Leinwan kingdom and the biological twin brother of the series' main protagonist, Pacifica. Voiced by Junji Majima in Japanese and Dave Wittenberg in English. |
| Prince Spong | The Secret Show | The leader of the Floaty Heads of the planet Zabulon and the brother of Princess Ping. |
| Prince Pyrus | Shadow Raiders | He is the prince of the Planet Fire. Voiced by Matt Hill. |
| Dakares Ciely Karlon Rhoden Vetran | Skeleton Knight in Another World | The second prince of the Rhoden Kingdom who secretly but actively participates in the elf and beast people slave trade in violation of a 400-year-old peace treaty. He was the younger son of King Karlon and the younger half-brother of Princesses Seriarna and Yuriarna. Voiced by Daiki Hamano (Japanese) and Bradley Gareth (English). |
| Sekt Rondahl Karlon Rhoden Sahdiay | Skeleton Knight in Another World | The first prince of the Rhoden Kingdom and the leader of the political faction who is enganged against his younger half-siblings Prince Dakares and Princess Yuriarna in a power struggle to successfully succeed to the throne. He is the older son of King Karlon and Lefitia Sahdiay. Voiced by Kengo Kawanishi (Japanese) and Grant Paulsen (English). |
| Philionel "Phil" El Di Seyruun | Slayers | The crown prince of Seyruun and the father of Princesses Amelia Wil Tesla and Gracia Ul Naga Seyruun. |
| Raji Shenazard | Snow White with the Red Hair | The first prince of Tanbarun and the older son of King Shenazard. Voiced by Jun Fukuyama (Japanese) and Todd Haberkorn (English). |
| Eugena Shenazard | Snow White with the Red Hair | The second prince of Tanbarun, younger son of King Shenazard and younger brother of Raji. Voiced by Mikako Komatsu (Japanese) and Megan Shipman (English). |
| Izana Wistaria | Snow White with the Red Hair | The first prince of Clarines and the older son of the late King Kain and Queen Haruto Wistaria. Voiced by Akira Ishida (Japanese) and Eric Vale (English). |
| Zen Wistaria | Snow White with the Red Hair | The second prince of Clarines, second son of King Kain and Queen Haruto Wistaria, younger brother of Izana and one of the main characters of the series. Voiced by Ryōta Ōsaka (Japanese) and Josh Grelle (English). |
| Cylis Analeit | So I'm a Spider, So What? | He is the crown prince of the Analeit Kingdom who launches a coup d'état to kill his father King Meiges and framing his younger half-brother Shun. Voiced by Takashi Kondō. |
| Julius Zagan Analeit | So I'm a Spider, So What? | He was the second prince of the Analeit Kingdom and the previous Hero who has been killed by a mysterious white girl, Shiraori. Voiced by Junya Enoki in Japanese and Landon McDonald in English. |
| Leston Analeit | So I'm a Spider, So What? | He is the third prince of the Analeit Kingdom. Voiced by Shunichi Toki. |
| Schlain Zagan Analeit/Shunsuke "Shun" Yamada | So I'm a Spider, So What? | He is the fourth prince of the Analeit Kingdom who is reincarnated from the Japanese high school student and becomes a new Hero after the death his brother Julius. Voiced by Shun Horie in Japanese and Alejandro Saab in English. |
| Princes from Sofia the First | Sofia the First | Prince James, stepbrother of Sofia the First and twin brother of Princess Amber; the prince of Enchancia. Voiced by Zach Callison, Tyler Merna and Nicolas Cantu.; Prince Hugo, the prince who attends Royal Prep. Voiced by Colin Ford and Grayson Hunter.; Prince Axel, Hugo's older brother. Voiced by Colin Ford.; Prince Jin of Wei-Ling, son of Emperor Quon and Empress Lin-Lin. Voiced by Brian JY Lee, Josie Totah and Forrest Wheeler.; Prince Khalid of Khaldoun, son of King Nasir and Queen Anya. Voiced by Khamani Griffin and Jaden Betts.; Prince Zander of Tangu. Voiced by Maxim Knight, Karan Brar, Cade Sutton and Nathaniel Semsen.; Prince Desmond, voiced by Maxim Knight and Joshua Carlon. |
| Manic the Hedgehog | Sonic Underground | He is the twin brother of Sonic and Sonia Hedgehog and one of the three children of Queen Aleena of Mobius. Voiced by Jaleel White (speaking) and Tyley Ross (singing). |
| Sonic the Hedgehog | Sonic Underground | Sonic appears in the series as the crown prince of Mobius, the son of Queen Aleena and the brother of Manic and Sonia Hedgehog. Voiced by Jaleel White; singing voice by Sam Vincent. |
| Prince Lumen | Spider Riders | The prince of Arachna and the leader of the Spider Riders; the older brother of Princess Sparkle. Voiced by Cameron Ansell in English and Kumiko Higa in Japanese. |
| Prince Triton | SpongeBob SquarePants | The teenage son of King Neptune and Queen Amphitrite. He appeared in the episode "The Clash of Triton" and was voiced by Sebastian Bach. |
| Tchar | Star Trek: The Animated Series | He is the hereditary prince of the ornithoid race called Skorr. Tchar appeared in the episode "The Jihad" and was voiced by James Doohan. |
| Thomas Draconius "Tom" Lucitor | Star vs. the Forces of Evil | Three-eyed demon crown prince of the Underworld. Voiced by Rider Strong. |
| Prince Gaima | Starzinger | Voiced by Keiichi Noda. |
| Seiran Shi | The Story of Saiunkoku | He is the exiled prince of Saiunkoku, son of the previous Emperor Shi Senka. Voiced by Andrew Francis in English and Hikaru Midorikawa in Japanese. |
| Prince Nevarhas Bin-Broak | TaleSpin | He is the eccentric but kindly hyena ruler of the Middle Eastern desert country in the episode "I Only Have Ice for You". Voiced by Jim Cummings. |
| Prince Rudolf | TaleSpin | He is a black swan who claims to be the "long-lost cousin" of Princess Grace in attempt to rule her kingdom of Walla-Walla-Bing-Bang in the episode "Waiders of the Wost Tweasure". Voiced by Dan Castellaneta. |
| Prince Krel Tarron | Tales of Arcadia | Voiced by Diego Luna. |
| Prince Pero | Tantei Opera Milky Holmes | The prince of Ripa who is meant to be engaged to marry Princess Claris but actually has to marry her grandmother. Voiced by Katsuyuki Konishi. |
| The Crystal Prince | Thumbelina: A Magical Story | Voiced by Akira Ishida (Japanese) and Jan Rabson (English). |
| Prince Dandarn | Time Travel Tondekeman | Voiced by Akira Kamiya. |
| Prince Richter | Tōshō Daimos | A part of the Robot Romance Trilogy, Richter is a disgruntled prince of the Baam Empire, and the brother of Princess Erika, who is determinded to assassinate the villainous Olban whose right-hand man Georiya had poisoned his father Emperor Leon. Voiced by Osamu Ichikawa. |
| Princes from Twin Princess of Wonder Planet | Twin Princess of Wonder Planet | Shade ("Eclipse"), the prince of the Moon Kingdom.; Tio, the prince of the Flame Kingdom.; Narlo, the baby prince of the Water Drop Kingdom.; Solo, the prince of the Seed Kingdom.; Bright, the prince of the Jewelry Kingdom.; Auler, the prince of the Windmill Kingdom. |
| Princes from Twin Princess of Wonder Planet Gyu! | Twin Princess of Wonder Planet | Toma, the prince of the planet Wulpurgis.; Noche, the prince of the planet Orchestra.; Fango, the prince of the planet Gretel.; Melon, the prince of the planet Naniwan.; Hiruzu, the prince of the planet Gorgeous. |
| Duke Fleed/Daisuke Umon | UFO Robot Grendizer | He is the crown prince whose Planet Fleed has been destroyed by the forces of King Vega, leading him and his sister Princess Maria Fleed to be raised on Earth. He is also the fiancé of Vega's daughter Princess Rubina. |
| Prince Puppycorn | Unikitty! | He is the younger brother of Princess Unikitty but is a hybrid of pug dog and unicorn; the rightful prince of the Unikingdom. Voiced by Grey Griffin. |
| A-Drei | Valvrave the Liberator | He is an agent captain and former prince of Dorssia. Voiced by Jun Fukuyama. |
| The Prince | Valvrave the Liberator | An unnamed prince of the Third Galactic Empire who so far only appears in the futuristic scenes. Voiced by Yui Horie. |
| Canute | Vinland Saga | The prince, and later king, of Danes. Based on the historical Canute the Great; voiced by Kenshō Ono. |
| Damian Baldur Flügel | Violet Evergarden | He is the prince of the Kingdom of Flügel who is engaged to marry Charlotte Abelfreyja Drossel, princess of the neighboring Kingdom of Drossel. Voiced by Kenjiro Tsuda. |
| Prince Heinel | Voltes V | A part of the Robot Romance Trilogy, Heinel, voiced by Osamu Ichikawa, is the prince and commander of Boazania whose evil uncle Emperor Zu Zambajil had him waging a senseless war against Earth. Also notice that his father, Professor Kentaro Goh (real name La Gour), is formerly the noble prince of Boazania. |
| Prince Lotor (Prince Imperial Sincline) | Voltron | Voiced by Lennie Weinrib in the 1980s version, Tim Curry in the 1990s version, Mark Hildreth in the 2011 version, and A.J. LoCascio in the 2016 version. |
| Prince Phobos | W.I.T.C.H. | He is the evil ruler of Meridian, in spite of his sister Princess Elyon being its rightful heir, and the primary antagonist of the series. Voiced by Mitchell Whitfield. |
| Prince Adale | Wakfu | The crown prince of New Sufokia. |
| Prince Armand Sheran Sharm | Wakfu | He is the prince of Sadida and the brother of Princess Amalia Sheran Sharm. |
| Prince Cashmere | Wander Over Yonder | Voiced by Bill Fagerbakke. |
| Prince Cavan (aka John Cavanaugh) | Wildfire | He is the prince of the planet Dar-Shan who was married to the late Queen Sarana to have a daughter, Princess Sara. His alter-ego is a farmer named John Cavanaugh. Voiced by David Ackroyd. |
| Prince Nereus | Winx Club | The merman crown prince of the planet Andros. |
| Prince Sky | Winx Club | The crown prince of the planet Eraklyon. |
| Prince Thoren | Winx Club | The paladin and the cousin of Prince Sky. |
| Tritannus | Winx Club | The former merprince of Andros, the evil twin brother of Nereus and one of the main antagonists of the series. |
| August von Earlshide | Wise Man's Grandchild | Also known simply as "Aug" or "Gus", he is invested as the crown prince of the Earlshide Kingdom and has a cousin-like relationship with Shin Wolford. He is the son of King Diseum and Queen Julia and the older brother of Princess May. Voiced by Shōhei Komatsu in Japanese and Brandon McInnis in English. |
| Leonhart "Leol" XV | Yakitate!! Japan | He is the heir to the throne of Monaco who becomes a world-class clown in the Quedam circus under the name Pierrot Bolneze; the biological son of King Leonhart XIV. Voiced by Tomokazu Seki. |
| Prince Cloud | Yume no Crayon Oukoku | The young prince who wields the Sword of Light and travels with Princess Silver. His ancestor Duke Klaus had defeated the evil Grim Reaper with Queen Buretsu. |

== Radio ==
| Fictional prince | Radio title | Notes |
|---|---|---|
| Prince Herbert | Another Case of Milton Jones | The character in the episode "Royal Speech Therapist" starring Milton Jones. |
| Prince of the Pigeon People | Special Relativity | Played by Dee Bradley Baker. |

== Video games ==
| Fictional prince | Game title | System(s) | Note |
|---|---|---|---|
| Alex Kidd | Alex Kidd in Miracle World | Master System | The main protagonist of the game series, Alex is the long-lost son of King Sander of Radaxian who used to live in Mount Eternal alone on the planet of Aries until he returns to Radaxian to rescue his brother Igle and his fiancée Princess Lora from the evil Janken the Great. |
| Prince Igle | Alex Kidd in Miracle World | Master System | He is the former prince, and now king, of Radaxian, the first son of King Sander and the older brother of Alex Kidd. |
| Crown Prince Orlando | ARMA: Queen's Gambit | Windows | The rightful heir of Sahrani who leads the Partisans in attempt to dethrone his evil sister Queen Isabella for her crimes. He is the son of the late King Joseph. |
| Matthias Ferrié Adalet | Atelier Lydie & Suelle: The Alchemists and the Mysterious Paintings | Vita; PS4; Windows; Switch | The crown prince of Adalet and a knight-in-training. Voiced by Yuuki Inoue. |
| Prince Morley | Breath of Fire IV | PlayStation; Windows | He is the prince of Ludia who has been betrothed to Princess Elina of Wyndia. |
| Prince Lance | Brigandine: The Legend of Forsena | PlayStation | The prince of the former kingdom of Padstow (renamed New Almekia) who becomes a new ruler after the abdication of his father King Coel. |
| Prince Rubino IV | Brigandine: The Legend of Runersia | Switch; PS4; Windows | The uncrowned ruler of the Norzaleo Kingdom and the son of the late King Rubino III. Voiced by Soma Saito. |
| Janus | Chrono Trigger | SNES; PlayStation; Nintendo DS | The prince of Zeal and the younger brother of Princess Schala. |
| Prince Farron | Conquest of the Crystal Palace | NES | He is the prince of the Kingdom of the Crystal Palace and the main protagonist of the game. |
| Prince Kirelan | Cute Knight | Windows; Linux; Mac | He has been raised as the heir to the throne by Queen Penelope who replaces him from her biological daughter Michiko. He is actually the son of magic teacher Orchid and the brother of Rose. |
| Narek Ischl de Milidonia | Dame×Prince | Android; iOS | The crown prince of Milidonia. Voiced by Kaito Ishikawa. |
| Mare Selen el Phiriazar | Dame×Prince | Android; iOS | The second prince of Selenfalen. Voiced by Ryōhei Kimura. |
| Ruze Selen el Phiriazar | Dame×Prince | Android; iOS | The first and airheaded prince of Selenfalen. Voiced by Sōma Saitō. |
| Prince Myer | Deadly Towers | NES | |
| Levantia Shaytham | The Diofield Chronicle | Windows; Switch; PS4; PS5; Xbox One; Xbox Series X/S | The prince of the Kingdom of Alletain and the brother of Princess Hezeliah Shaytham. |
| Prince Euden | Dragalia Lost | Android; iOS | He is the seventh prince of Alberia whose royal family has the Dragon Transformation ability and who sets off on his Dragon Selection Trial to save his kingdom. |
| Sebastian Vael | Dragon Age II | Windows; PS3; Xbox 360; OS X | The kind but often mocked prince in exile of Starkhaven. He is only available through The Exiled Prince DLC. Voiced by Alec Newman. |
| Alistair | Dragon Age: Origins | Windows; Xbox 360; PS3; Mac OS X; Xbox One | He is the son of King Maric and Fiona and the heir to the throne of Ferelden who may be put on as the king. Voiced by Steve Valentine. |
| Prince of Cannock | Dragon Quest II: Luminaries of the Legendary Line | NES/Famicom | The cousin of the Prince of Midenhall and Princess of Moonbrooke and one of the main characters of the game. |
| Prince of Midenhall | Dragon Quest II: Luminaries of the Legendary Line | NES/Famicom | The main protagonist of the game. |
| Prince Harry | Dragon Quest V: Hand of the Heavenly Bride | Super Famicom; PS2; Nintendo DS; iOS; Android | The elder son of the King of Coburg. |
| Prince of Somnia | Dragon Quest VI: Realms of Revelation | Super Famicom; Nintendo DS; iOS; Android | The main protagonist who gets some strange dreams in the village of Weaver's Peak. He is the son of King Somnus and Queen Apnea. |
| Prince Kiefer | Dragon Quest VII: Fragments of the Forgotten Past | PlayStation; Nintendo 3DS; iOS; Android | He is the prince and heir to the throne of Estard. Kiefer also appeared as the main character in Dragon Quest Monsters: Caravan Heart. |
| Prince Charmles | Dragon Quest VIII: Journey of the Cursed King | PS2; Android; iOS; Nintendo 3DS | Spoiled prince of Argonia and the son of King Clavius; the cousin of the Hero. |
| The Hero | Dragon Quest VIII: Journey of the Cursed King | PS2; Android; iOS; Nintendo 3DS | The main protagonist who is the lost son of the late Prince Eltrio and Princess Xia of Argonia. |
| Prince Odisu | Dragon Quest X: Awakening of the Five Tribes Online | Wii; Wii U; Windows; Android; iOS; 3DS; PS4; Switch | The son of Queen Diore and the prince of the Weltings. |
| Prince Ragus | Dragon Quest X: Awakening of the Five Tribes Online | Wii; Wii U; Windows; Android; iOS; 3DS; PS4; Switch | The prince of the Poppets. |
| Prince Thomas "Toma" | Dragon Quest X: Awakening of the Five Tribes Online | Wii; Wii U; Windows; Android; iOS; 3DS; PS4; Switch | The villainous prince of Grand Zetannia, the son of King Arios and Princess Yulia, and the brother of Princess Anlucia. |
| Prince Faris | Dragon Quest XI: Echoes of an Elusive Age | 3DS; PS4; Windows; Switch; Xbox One; Stadia | The son of the Sultan of Gallopolis. |
| The Luminary | Dragon Quest XI: Echoes of an Elusive Age | 3DS; PS4; Windows; Switch; Xbox One; Stadia | The main protagonist of the game who is the lost prince of Dundrasil; the biological son of King Irwin and Queen Eleanor. |
| Prince Cesar | Dragon Quest Heroes II | PS3; Vita; PS4; Switch; Windows | The mighty warrior-prince of Dunisia and one of the main characters of the game. |
| Prince Anlace | Dragon Quest Swords: The Masked Queen and the Tower of Mirrors | Wii | The prince of Avalonia. |
| Prince Serios (Logan) | Dragon Slayer: The Legend of Heroes | NEC PC-8801; NEC PC-9801; FM Towns; MSX 2; TurboGrafx-CD; Super Famicom; X68000; Mega Drive; Satellaview; Windows; PlayStation; Saturn | He was formerly the prince of Farlalyne, son of King Corwin I and Queen Felicia (Sylvia), and the main protagonist of the game. He later becomes the king of Farlalyne in Dragon Slayer: The Legend of Heroes II. |
| Princes Atlas | Dragon Slayer: The Legend of Heroes II | NEC PC-8801; NEC PC-9801; FM Towns; MSX 2; PC Engine CD; Super Famicom; Mega Drive; MS-DOS; PlayStation; Saturn | The son of King Serios and Queen Tina (Mica) of Farlalyne and the new protagonist of the game. |
| Prince Lace | Dragon Spirit: The New Legend | NES | The prince of the kingdom of Olympis, the son of King Amul (Amru in English) and Queen Alicia and the brother of Princess Iris. |
| The Prince (The Hero) | Fable III | Xbox 360; Windows | The player may choose to control either a male character (The Prince/The Hero), voiced by Louis Tamone, or a female character (The Princess/The Heroine), voiced by Mischa Goodman. |
| The Elf Prince | Final Fantasy | NES; various | He is the prince of Elfheim who has been put into a deep sleep by the evil dark elf, Astos, until he is revived by the Light Warriors. |
| Prince Gordon | Final Fantasy II | Famicom; WonderSwan Color; PlayStation; GBA; PSP; iOS; Android | The prince of Kas'ion. |
| Prince Scott | Final Fantasy II | Famicom; WonderSwan Color; PlayStation; GBA; PSP; iOS; Android | Prince Gordon's older brother. |
| Edward Chris von Muir | Final Fantasy IV | SNES; PlayStation; WonderSwan Color; GBA; FOMA 903i/703i; PSP | He is the prince of Damcyan who later becomes the seventh king of the region. |
| Edward Geraldine | Final Fantasy IV | SNES; PlayStation; WonderSwan Color; GBA; FOMA 903i/703i; PSP | Also known simply as "Edge". He is the skilled ninja prince of Eblan. |
| Edgar Roni Figaro | Final Fantasy VI | SNES; PlayStation; GBA; Android; iOS; Windows | He was formerly the prince, and now king, of the Figaro Castle. |
| Sabin Rene Figaro | Final Fantasy VI | SNES; PlayStation; GBA; Android; iOS; Windows | Also known as Macias Rene Figaro in Japanese version, he is King Edgar Figaro's younger twin brother. |
| Eald'narche | Final Fantasy XI | PS2; Windows; Xbox 360 | The Zilart prince. |
| Kam'lanaut | Final Fantasy XI | PS2; Windows; Xbox 360 | Eald'narche's brother. |
| Rasler Heios Nabradia | Final Fantasy XII | PS2; PS4; Windows; Xbox One; Switch | He was the prince of Nabradia. |
| Noctis Lucis Caelum | Final Fantasy XV | PS4; Xbox One; Windows | Also known simply as Noct, he is the crown prince of the Kingdom of Lucis and the only son and heir of King Regis Lucis Caelum CXIII. |
| Ravus Nox Fleuret | Final Fantasy XV | PS4; Xbox One; Windows | Formerly the prince of Tenebrae, older brother of the former Princess Lunafreya the oracle, he is the high commander and the secondary antagonist of the game. |
| Orinas Atkascha | Final Fantasy Tactics | PlayStation | Prince of Ordalia and younger brother of Princess Ovelia Atkascha. |
| Chrom | Fire Emblem Awakening | Nintendo 3DS | One of the main characters of the game, he is the prince of Ylisse, the middle brother of Queen Emmeryn and Princess Lissa, and the future father of Princess Lucina. |
| Conrad | Fire Emblem Echoes: Shadows of Valentia | Nintendo 3DS | He is the prince of Zofia, the son of King Lima IV and half-brother of Princess Celica. |
| Corrin (Avatar) | Fire Emblem Fates | Nintendo 3DS | The player may choose to control either a male (Nohr Prince) or female character (Nohr Princess). |
| Hoshidan Princes | Fire Emblem Fates | Nintendo 3DS | Ryoma, the first prince of Hoshido, older son of King Sumeragi and Queen Ikona; older stepson of Queen Mikoto.; Takumi, the second prince of Hoshido, younger son of King Sumeragi and Queen Ikona; younger stepson of Queen Mikoto.; Brothers of the Hoshidan Princesses Hinoka and Sakura. |
| Nohrian Princes | Fire Emblem Fates | Nintendo 3DS | Xander, first prince and heir apparent of Nohr and older son of King Garon.; Leo, second prince of Nohr and younger son of King Garon.; Brothers of the Nohrian Princesses Camilla and Elise and stepbrothers of Princess Azura. |
| Albein Alm Rudolf | Fire Emblem Gaiden; Fire Emblem Echoes: Shadows of Valentia | Famicom; 3DS | Also known simply as Alm, he is the prince from the Rigelian Empire who has been fostered in the village by former knight Mycen; the biological son and heir of the late Emperor Rudolf. |
| Julius | Fire Emblem: Genealogy of the Holy War | Super Famicom | The scion of Loptyr and the prince of Grannvale. |
| Kurth | Fire Emblem: Genealogy of the Holy War | Super Famicom | He was the prince of Grannvale who was murdered. |
| Leif | Fire Emblem: Genealogy of the Holy War | Super Famicom | Prince of Leonster and the brother of Princess Altena. |
| Quan | Fire Emblem: Genealogy of the Holy War | Super Famicom | The prince of Leonster and the father of Prince Leif and Princess Altena. |
| Seliph | Fire Emblem: Genealogy of the Holy War | Super Famicom | The prince of Chalphy and the son of Prince Sigurd and Queen Deirdre. |
| Sigurd | Fire Emblem: Genealogy of the Holy War | Super Famicom | The prince of Grannvale and Chalphy; Seliph's father. |
| Alfonse | Fire Emblem Heroes | Android; iOS | The prince of the Askr Kingdom and the older brother of Princess Sharena. |
| Bruno | Fire Emblem Heroes | Android; iOS | The prince of the Emblian Empire and older half-brother of Princess Veronica. |
| Hríd | Fire Emblem Heroes | Android; iOS | The prince of the Nifl Kingdom and the older brother of the princesses Gunnthrá, Fjorm and Ygler. |
| Ótr | Fire Emblem Heroes | Android; iOS | The villainous prince of Niðavellir, older brother of Princess Reginn and adoptive brother of King Fáfnir. |
| Reyson | Fire Emblem: Path of Radiance | GameCube | He is the white-winged Heron prince of Serenes, son of King Lorazieh and brother of Princess Leanne. |
| Rafiel | Fire Emblem: Radiant Dawn | Wii | He is the first Heron prince of Serenes and older brother of Reyson and Leanne. |
| Marth | Fire Emblem: Shadow Dragon and the Blade of Light; Fire Emblem: Mystery of the Emblem; Fire Emblem: Shadow Dragon; Fire Emblem: New Mystery of the Emblem | Famicom; Nintendo DS | Better known as the heroic prince of Altea, Marth is one of the primary protagonists of the series. |
| Michalis | Fire Emblem: Shadow Dragon and the Blade of Light; Fire Emblem: Shadow Dragon | Famicom; Nintendo DS | He is the former prince, and now king, of Macedon and older brother of Princesses Minerva and Maria. |
| Elffin | Fire Emblem: The Binding Blade | Game Boy Advance | Although he is the local rebel, Elffin is actually the prince of Etruria. |
| Zephiel | Fire Emblem: The Blazing Blade | Game Boy Advance | He was formerly the prince of Bern, son of King Desmond and Queen Hellene. He becomes the king of Bern and the main antagonist in Fire Emblem: The Binding Blade. |
| Ephraim | Fire Emblem: The Sacred Stones | Game Boy Advance | The prince of Renais, twin brother of Princess Eirika and one of the main characters of the game. |
| Innes | Fire Emblem: The Sacred Stones | Game Boy Advance | He is the prince of Frelia and older brother of Princess Tana. |
| Lyon | Fire Emblem: The Sacred Stones | Game Boy Advance | The prince of the Grado Empire and the secondary antagonist of the game. |
| Khalid "Claude" von Riegan | Fire Emblem: Three Houses; Fire Emblem Warriors: Three Hopes | Nintendo Switch | The heir of House Riegan, son of Tiana von Riegan and the King of Almyra, and the leader of the Golden Deer. |
| Dimitri Alexandre Blaiddyd | Fire Emblem: Three Houses; Fire Emblem Warriors: Three Hopes | Nintendo Switch | The crown prince of the Holy Kingdom of Faerghus and the leader of the Blue Lions. He is the stepbrother of Princess Edelgard of the Adrestian Empire. |
| Darios | Fire Emblem Warriors | Nintendo Switch; New Nintendo 3DS | Prince of the Gristonne Kingdom and the son of King Oskar. |
| Rowan | Fire Emblem Warriors | Nintendo Switch; New Nintendo 3DS | Prince of the Aytolis Kingdom, son of Queen Yelena, and younger twin brother of Princess Lianna. |
| Prince James Stewart | Gabriel Knight 3: Blood of the Sacred, Blood of the Damned | Windows | The prince of Albany and a descendant of the House of Stuart. Voiced by Simon Templeman. |
| Prince Ander | Gemfire | MSX; NES; SNES; Mega Drive/Genesis; MS-DOS; NEC PC-9801; FM Towns; X68000; NEC PC-8801; Windows | The leader of the Lyles. |
| Prince Erin | Gemfire | MSX; NES; SNES; Mega Drive/Genesis; MS-DOS; NEC PC-9801; FM Towns; X68000; NEC PC-8801; Windows | The leader of the Blanches. |
| Traveler's Sibling | Genshin Impact | Android; iOS; Windows; PS4; PS5 | The player may choose either a male (Prince of the Abyss Order) or female character (Princess of the Abyss Order). |
| Prince Pixel | Graffiti Kingdom | PlayStation 2 | The prince of the Canvas Kingdom who takes the graffiti wand to create Graffiti Creatures to restore his kingdom. |
| Richard | Heroes of Mana | Nintendo DS | He was formerly the prince and the "Silver Knight" of Valsena. He later becomes the king of Valsena in Trials of Mana. |
| Crown Prince | Ice Palace | Commodore 64 | |
| The Prince | JumpStart Adventures 4th Grade: Haunted Island | Windows; Macintosh | The character based on "The Frog Prince" in the Enchanted Forest, in an early version of the JumpStart Adventures 4th Grade game prior to its updated version Sapphire Falls. Voiced by Tony Pope. |
| Prince Richard | Kaeru no Tame ni Kane wa Naru | Game Boy | The prince of the Custard Kingdom. |
| Prince of Sablé | Kaeru no Tame ni Kane wa Naru | Game Boy | The prince of the Sablé Kingdom. |
| The Prince | Katamari | PS2; PS3; Nintendo DSi; Switch; Xbox 360; iOS; Android | Also referred to as the Dashing Prince or the Prince of All Cosmos; he is the son of the King of All Cosmos and the main protagonist of the game series. |
| Prince Alexander (aka Gwydion) | King's Quest III: To Heir Is Human | MS-DOS; Apple II; Apple IIGS; Amiga; Atari ST; Mac; Tandy Color Computer 3 | |
| Prince Edgar | King's Quest IV: The Perils of Rosella | MS-DOS; Amiga; Apple II; Apple IIGS; Atari ST | |
| Prince Fluff | Kirby's Epic Yarn | Wii; Nintendo 3DS | He is the prince of Patch Land. |
| Prince Garett (Ledin) | Langrisser: The Descendants of Light | Mega Drive/Genesis; PlayStation; Saturn; MS-DOS; PC Engine; 90xi Series Mobile Phone; PSN | The prince of the Kingdom of Baltia, and the son of King Alfador (Illzach), who leads his armies to battle the Dalsis Empire and the monsters they unwittingly awaken. |
| Olivert Reise Arnor | The Legend of Heroes: Trails in the Sky | Windows; PSP; PS3; Vita | He is the prince of the Empire of Erebonia and the oldest son of Emperor Eugent III and Empress Priscilla. |
| Cedric Reise Arnor | The Legend of Heroes: Trails of Cold Steel | PS3; Vita; Windows; PS4 | He is the half-brother of Prince Olivert, crown prince of the Empire of Erebonia, the son of Emperor Eugent III and Empress Priscilla, and the twin brother of Princess Alfin. |
| Prince Sidon | The Legend of Zelda: Breath of the Wild | Wii U; Nintendo Switch | The prince of the Zoras, son of King Dorephan and the brother of Princess Mipha. |
| Prince Ralis | The Legend of Zelda: Twilight Princess | Wii; GameCube | The crown prince of the Zoras and the son King Zora and Queen Rutela. |
| Blind Prince | The Liar Princess and the Blind Prince | Vita; Switch; PS4; Android; iOS | He is a human prince who becomes blind by accident when the wolf princess impulsively tries to cover his eyes. |
| Prince Dreambert | Mario & Luigi: Dream Team | Nintendo 3DS | The prince of the Pi'illo people. |
| Prince Peasley | Mario & Luigi: Superstar Saga | Game Boy Advance | The prince of the Beanbean kingdom and the son of Queen Bean. |
| Prince Paco | Marvel Land | Arcade; Sega Mega Drive | Also known as Prince Talmit in English. |
| Goro | Mortal Kombat | Arcade | |
| Rain | Mortal Kombat | Arcade | He is the Prince and demigod of Edenia. |
| Prince Selius Heatherwood | Nine Parchments; Trine 4: The Nightmare Prince | Windows; PS4; Xbox One; Nintendo Switch | Voiced by Daniel Kendrick. |
| Cornelius | Odin Sphere | PS2; PS3; PS4; Vita | The prince of the Fire Kingdom of Titania who has been transformed into a Pooka. Voiced by Daisuke Namikawa. |
| Ingway | Odin Sphere | PS2; PS3; PS4; Vita | Also known as Yngwie in Japanese, he is the prince from the destroyed Kingdom of Valentine who has been turned into a frog by the sorcerers, the Three Wise Men. He is the maternal grandson of the villainous King Valentine, older twin brother of Princess Velvet and half-brother of the Valkyrie Princess Gwyndolyn. Voiced by Showtaro Morikubo. |
| Prince Gares | Ogre Battle: The March of the Black Queen | SNES; Saturn; PlayStation; Mobile phone | He is the imperial prince and Black Knight of the Sacred Zetegenian Empire who is to become an ogre. |
| Pheryx Tristan Zenobia | Ogre Battle: The March of the Black Queen | SNES; Saturn; PlayStation; Mobile phone | Also known simply as Tristan, he is the prince and rightful heir of Zenobia, the son of the late King Gran and Queen Floran Zenobia and the brother of Prince Jan. He later becomes the king of New Zenobia. |
| Rhys | Phantasy Star III | Sega Genesis | He is the Orakian crown prince of Landen. |
| Nahyuta Sahdmadhi | Phoenix Wright: Ace Attorney − Spirit of Justice | Nintendo 3DS; iOS; Android | The prosecutor from the Kingdom of Khura'in, a small Asian country. He acts as a regent as his younger sister Rayfa Padma Khura'in, crown princess and royal priestess of the Khura'inism religion, becomes in-line as Queen by post-game. |
| Prince | Prince of Persia | Various | There are several distinct Prince characters, sharing general traits for several main protagonists of the series. |
| Tapioca | Princess Quest | Sega Saturn; PC | The prince of Dilma. Voiced by Emi Shinohara. |
| Patton Misnarge | Rance | PC-8800 series; PC-9800 series; X68000; FM Towns; Windows | The former prince of the Helman Empire who has led the war against the Leazas Kingdom. |
| Ferdinand Marl E. | Rhapsody: A Musical Adventure | PlayStation; PSN; DS | He was the former prince, and now king, of the Marl Kingdom. |
| Prince Calum | The Royal Trap | Windows; Mac OS X; Linux | The prince of the rival kingdom of Gwellinor and the brother of Princess Cassidy. |
| Prince Oscar | The Royal Trap | Windows; Mac OS X; Linux | The prince of Ocendawyr whose companion Madeleine Valois serves as his bodyguard. |
| Arthur D. Lawrence | Rune Factory 4 | 3DS; Switch; Windows; PS4; Xbox One | He is the actual prince of the kingdom of Norad whose townspeople in Selphia have mistaken Lest for their prince, or Frey for their princess. |
| Nick | Shining Force Gaiden; Shining Force: The Sword of Hajya | Game Gear | He is the prince of Cypress and the main character of the games. |
| Ragnus | Shining Hearts | PlayStation Portable | He is the prince of Wynderia and the older brother of Princess Rufina. |
| Prince Tortiss | Spyro 2: Ripto's Rage!; Spyro Reignited Trilogy | PlayStation; PS4; Xbox One; Windows; Switch | The turtle prince of Sunny Beach in the Summer Forest who asks Spyro to bring the baby turtles to safety in the other end of his realm. |
| Prince Azrael | Spyro: Year of the Dragon; Spyro Reignited Trilogy | PlayStation; PS4; Xbox One; Windows; Switch | The feline prince of Felinia who has to marry the fairy princess Ami. His name and appearance are a reference to Gargamel's pet cat from The Smurfs. |
| Prince Tricky | Star Fox Adventures | GameCube | A young Centrosaurus who is the crown prince of the EarthWalker Tribe and serves as a companion of Fox McCloud. |
| Luca Blight | Suikoden II | PlayStation; Windows | The prince and heir to the throne of Highland and a major antagonist of the game who is referred to as the "Mad Prince". He is the son of the late King Agares Blight and the half-brother of Princess Jillia. |
| Freyjadour Falenas | Suikoden V | PlayStation 2 | The prince and heir of the Queendom of Falena and the main character of the game who deals with the political struggles of the nation. He is the son of Queen Arshtat Falenas and Ferid Egan and the brother of Princess Lym Falenas. |
| Prince Shams | Suikoden Tierkreis | Nintendo DS | The prince of the Magedom of Janam, the son of Mage Lord Danash VIII and Lady Kureyah and the stepbrother of Princess Manaril. |
| Dylan Will Delteana | Summon Night X: Tears Crown | Nintendo DS | He is the prince and heir of the Kingdom of Delteana, son of King Glocken, and the male protagonist of the game. Voiced by Jun Fukuyama. |
| Noin Won Celestia | Summon Night X: Tears Crown | Nintendo DS | He is the prince from the Kingdom of Celestia, older brother of Princess Phara and son of King Novice, who has been taken by Prince Dylan's father Glocken to settle disputes between two kingdoms. Voiced by Daisuke Kishio. |
| Mallow | Super Mario RPG: Legend of the Seven Stars | SNES | The rightful prince of Nimbus Land who has been turned into a tadpole. |
| Bowser Jr. | Super Mario Sunshine | GameCube | He is the son and heir of the Koopa King Bowser and one of the main antagonists of the Mario series. |
| Prince AbeABE | Super Monkey Ball Adventure | GameCube; PS2; PSP | The monkey prince of Monkitropolis. |
| Elliot | Trials of Mana | Super Famicom; Switch; Windows; PS4 | He is the young prince of the Wind Kingdom of Laurent and the brother of Princess Riesz. He is voiced by Christie Cate in the video game remake. |
| Kevin | Trials of Mana | Super Famicom; Switch; Windows; PS4 | He is the prince of Ferolia and the son of the Beast King; one of the main protagonists of the game. He is voiced by T.J. Rhoads in English and Ryota Ohsaka in Japanese in the video game remake. |
| Roland Glenbrook | Triangle Strategy | Nintendo Switch | The prince of the Kingdom of Glenbrook and the member of the House Wolffort War Council who becomes a sole heir to the throne after the villainous Archduke Gustadolph Aesfrost has seized his country, executing his father King Regna and brother Prince Frani and capturing his younger sister Princess Cordelia. Voiced by Alan Lee in English and Yuichi Nakamura in Japanese. |
| Asriel Dreemurr ("Flowey") | Undertale | Windows; OS X; Linux; PS4; Vita; Switch | He is the son of King Asgore Dreemurr and Toriel of the Underground and main antagonist of the game. |
| Cecil Aijima (Kuppuru) | Uta no Prince-sama | PlayStation Portable | He is the prince from Agnapolis who has been cursed to transform into a black cat. Voiced by Kousuke Toriumi. |
| Maximilian Gaius Von Reginrave | Valkyria Chronicles | PS3; Windows; PS4 | He is the imperial prince of East Europan Imperial Alliance and the main antagonist of the game. Voiced by Matthew Yang King in English and Jun Fukuyama in Japanese. |
| Maxim Laertes | Valkyria Revolution | PS4; Vita; Xbox One | He is the exiled prince of Ipseria who has been pressed into service as a military officer in the Ruzhien Empire. |
| Mont Leonis | War of the Visions: Final Fantasy Brave Exvius | Android; iOS | Also known as the Destined Prince, he is formerly the first prince, and later king, of the Kingdom of Leonis; the first son of King Oelde and Queen and Helena Leonis. Voiced by Bryce Papenbrook in English and Kensho Ono in Japanese. |
| Sterne Leonis | War of the Visions: Final Fantasy Brave Exvius | Android; iOS | He is the second prince of the Kingdom of Leonis, the Knight of Ruin, and a major antagonist of the game; Mont's younger twin brother and the second son of King Oelde and Queen Helena. Voiced by Zach Aguilar in English and Yūichirō Umehara in Japanese. |
| Arthas Menethil | Warcraft III: Reign of Chaos; Heroes of the Storm | Windows; Mac | Arthas was formerly the crown prince of Lordaeron. He is currently known as the Lich King, leader of the Scourge. |
| Kael'thas Sunstrider | Warcraft III: The Frozen Throne | Windows; Mac OS X | He was the prince of Quel'Thalas and the lord of the Blood Elves. |
| Anduin Wrynn | World of Warcraft: Battle for Azeroth; Heroes of the Storm | Windows; Mac OS X | Formerly, he was the Crown Prince of Stormwind, son of the late King Varian Wrynn; he is the King of Stormwind, High King of the Alliance, and commander of all Alliance forces. |
| Zeke von Genbu | Xenoblade Chronicles 2 | Nintendo Switch | Zeke, whose real name is Ozychlyrus Brounev Tantal, is the crown prince of the Kingdom of Tantal and the son of King Eulogimenos Tantal. Eulogimenos previously disowned him and banished him from Tantal due to him breaking its isolationist policies. |
| Prince Pine | Yoshi's Safari | SNES | The son of King Fret and the prince of Jewelry Land. |
| Prince Atory Arcadia | Zoids Saga; Zoids VS | GBA; Nintendo DS; GameCube | Also known as Athle Arcadia in the international version, he is the prince of Arcadia Kingdom. In Zoids VS, he is voiced by Noriko Hidaka in Japanese and Greg Ayres in English. |

== See also ==
- List of fictional princesses
- List of fictional monarchs (fictional countries)
- List of fictional nobility
