= List of So I'm a Spider, So What characters =

This is a list of characters appearing in the novel series So I'm a Spider, So What? (Japanese: 蜘蛛ですが、なにか？, Hepburn: Kumo Desu ga, Nanika?), written by Okina Baba and illustrated by Tsukasa Kiryu, and its anime and manga adaptations.

== Main ==
=== White ===
White (白, Shiro) / Shiraori (白織)
Voiced by: Aoi Yūki (anime), Sumire Uesaka (PV & CM) (Japanese); Brianna Knickerbocker (English)
Nicknamed "Kumoko" by the fandom. She reincarnated as an initially "Nameless" spider monster in the most dangerous dungeon in the world, where she constantly fights to survive and slowly evolves into a powerful being, becoming known as the "Nightmare of the Labyrinth". She eventually escapes the dungeon only to come into conflict with the Demon Lord, Ariel, before ultimately making peace with her, resulting in her becoming the morarch's subordinate. In the prolepsis, she has acquired a human form and serves as the commander of the 10th demon army. Initially implied to be the reincarnation of the classmate Hiiro Wakaba, she is later revealed to have actually been just an ordinary spider that happened to be in the classroom when everyone was reincarnated and was implanted with the real Wakaba's memories by D.

=== Ariel ===
Ariel (アリエル, Arieru)
Voiced by: Sumire Uesaka (Japanese); Veronica Taylor (English)
The current "Demon Lord" and progenitor of all spider monsters in the world. Though physically a girl in her early teens, she is actually one of the oldest beings on the planet. She confronts White after she finally escapes the dungeon and tries to kill her due to the damage she was inflicting to the spider monster species' hive-mind. However, after multiple failed attempts, the two agree to a ceasefire and start traveling together, eventually putting their grievances aside and building a very strong grandmother-granddaughter relationship. In the prolepsis, she wages war against humanity and is generally viewed as a tyrant. However, her warmongering roughly began to make sense following the main story's revelation that the planet is dying, since the world's RPG system gathers the energy of people's skills upon their deaths to heal the planet.

=== Sophia ===
Sophia Keren (ソフィア・ケレン, Sofia Keren) / Shouko Negishi (根岸 彰子, Negishi Shōko)
Voiced by: Ayana Taketatsu (Japanese); Ryan Bartley (English)
One of the classmates, nicknamed "Vampy" by White. She reincarnated as a vampire born to human parents due to a mutation. She crossed paths with White when she was still a baby and was later taken in by her and Ariel after her home was destroyed in a war. Bullied in her previous life for being ugly with the mocking nickname "Rihoko", short for "Real Horror Girl" (Spooky in translations), she initially disliked everything and everyone associated with her past self, including White. However, over time, she developed a very close, sister-like relationship with her, to the point of becoming possessive. In the prolepsis, she offers manipulative assistance to fellow classmate Hugo and is later revealed to be an officer in the tenth demon army.

=== Wrath ===
Wrath (ラース, Rāsu) / Razu-Razu (ラズラズ) / Kyouya Sasajima (笹島 京也, Sasajima Kyōya)
Voiced by: Ryōta Ōsaka (Japanese); Casey Mongillo (English)
One of the classmates, nicknamed "Mr. Oni" by White. He was reincarnated as a goblin. Having never liked the capitalistic modern world, he actually enjoyed the goblins' hunter-gatherer lifestyle. However, one day, his village was destroyed by humans and he was enslaved by them. After subsequently being abused by them, he broke free after unlocking his unique skill, which raises his stats tenfold at the cost of his sanity. He subsequently went on a rampage, evolving into an oni in the process. This continued until he crossed paths with White, who subsequently defeated him and deactivated his skill, after which he joined her group. In the prolepsis, he is the commander of the 8th Demon Army and is revealed to have been friends with Shun during their previous lives.

=== Merazophis ===
Merazophis (メラゾフィス, Merazofisu)
Voiced by: Kenjiro Tsuda (Japanese); Kyle Hebert (English)
Sophia's butler, whom she has a one-sided crush on, nicknamed "Mera" by White. Her parents entrusted her to him when their home was destroyed in a war. However, they ended up being mortally injured whilst fleeing with her, forcing her to turn him into a vampire to save his life. Though struggling with his fading humanity, he continues to strive to protect his mistress. In the prolepsis, he is the commander of the 4th Demon Army and the arch-nemesis of the classmates Kunihiko and Asaka, having massacred their tribe. However, it is later revealed that this was retaliation for said tribe regularly raiding demon lands.

=== Gullie ===
Güliedistodiez (ギュリエディストディエス, Gyuriedisutodiesu) / Black (黒, Kuro)
Voiced by: Daisuke Namikawa (Japanese); Robbie Daymond (English)
A god who takes on the form of a man dressed in black armor and the ruler of the dragons, nicknamed "Gulie" by White and Ariel. While concerned that the reincarnations might upset the world's balance, he has been ordered by his superior, D, not to interfere. He is also an old friend of Ariel and agrees to serve as the commander of the 9th Demon Army under her in the Prolepsis to keep an eye on her and White.

=== Ael, Sael, Riel & Fiel ===
Ael (アエル, Aeru), Sael (サエル, Saeru), Riel (リエル, Rieru) & Fiel (フィエル, Fieru)
Ariel's quartet of Puppet Taratects, small spider-type monsters that operate human-sized mannequins. Although initially enemies, they grow close with White after they start traveling together and she gave their mannequins a make-over, giving them an almost human-like appearance. Though incapable of speech, each still displays their own personal traits: Ael is the serious one, Sael the timid one, Riel the airheaded one, and Fiel the mischievous one.

=== D ===
D / Hiiro Wakaba (若葉 姫色, Wakaba Hiiro)
Voiced by: Saori Hayami (Japanese); Tara Sands (English)
One of the classmates. She was initially implied to be White's past self and an otaku who was a victim of bullying. However, it is later revealed that she is actually a high-ranking god who was slacking off from her duties. She was the one who reincarnated her classmates after they were killed in an explosion, which was actually an attempt on her life by a previous Hero and Demon Lord, and created White by giving her memories to a random spider to make it seem like "Wakaba" had died, just to avoid being found and dragged back to work by her fellow gods. She is also the creator of the world's RPG system, which is a curse she placed on humanity after they nearly destroyed the world once, allowing them to develop energy in the form of skills that she takes back upon their deaths to slowly heal the planet. Throughout the story, she takes a more-or-less neutral stance, occasionally aiding White whilst also making the situations she finds herself in worse for her own entertainment.

== Prolepsis ==
- While the storylines initially appeared to be concurrent, it is eventually revealed that the prolepsis actually takes place roughly fifteen years in the future, with the timelines gradually converging as the events of the main story catch up and elaborate on what was actually happening behind-the-scenes.

=== Shun ===
Schlain Zagan Analeit (シュレイン・ザガン・アナレイト, Shurein Zagan Anareito) / Shunsuke Yamada (山田 俊介, Yamada Shunsuke)
Voiced by: Shun Horie (Japanese); Alejandro Saab (English)
One of the classmates, nicknamed "Shun" by his friends. He reincarnated as the fourth prince of the Analeit Kingdom. Having had a sheltered upbringing, he is very dense and naive. He later inherits the hero title following the death of his older brother, Julius, and has to flee his Kingdom after being framed for a coup d'état by his classmate, Hugo, and his older half-brother, Cylis. He subsequently embarks on a journey to the Elf Village to stop Hugo, who is wreaking havoc on the world, unaware that the elves are manipulating him in a shadow war against the demons and the church.

=== Katia ===
Karnatia Seri Anabald (カルナティア・セリ・アナバルド, Karunatia Seri Anabarudo) / Kanata Ōshima (大島 叶多, Ōshima Kanata)
Voiced by: Nao Tōyama (Japanese); Kira Buckland (English)
One of the classmates and a member of Shun's party, nicknamed "Katia" by her friends. She reincarnated as a noblewoman in the Analeit Kingdom. She suffers from gender dysphoria due to having been a man in her previous life, though it is implied that he was Gay, which only grows more complicated when she starts developing romantic feelings for Shun. However, she ultimately resolves that her past self is dead and fully embraces her new gender.

=== Fei ===
Feirune (フェイルーン, Feirūn) / Mirei Shinohara (漆原 美麗, Shinohara Mirei)
Voiced by: Eri Kitamura (Japanese); Elise Eikermann (English)
One of the classmates and a member of Shun's party, nicknamed "Fei" by her friends. She reincarnated as Shun's pet earth dragon and later evolved into a light dragon after he became the new hero, gaining a human form in the process. A bully in her previous life, she sees her current predicament as karmic punishment and vows to better herself. Because of this, she was distraught upon learning one of her former victims, Wakaba, had supposedly died after reincarnating. This also leads her to be shocked upon crossing paths with White, mistaking her for Wakaba. After the timelines converge, however, she is the only classmate who deduces that White is not Wakaba's reincarnation.

=== Sue ===
Suelecia Analeit (スーレシア・アナレイト, Sūreshia Anareito)
Voiced by: Yui Ogura (Japanese); Kira Buckland (English)
The second princess of the Analeit Kingdom and Shun's younger half-sister, nicknamed "Sue" by her friends. She is a yandere with a brother complex, which is obvious to everyone except her brother. When Hugo overthrew Analeit, she was seemingly brainwashed and forced to assassinate her father while framing Shun. However, it is later revealed that she was actually not being controlled at all and willingly aided White out of fear. After the timelines converge, she betrays White and sides with Shun.

=== Ms. Oka ===
Filimøs Harrifenas (フィリメス・ハァイフェナス, Firimesu Haaifenasu) / Kanami Okazaki (岡崎 香奈美, Okazaki Kanami)
Voiced by: Kaya Okuno (Japanese); Cherami Leigh (English)
The class' homeroom teacher and a member of Shun's party, nicknamed "Ms. Oka" by her students. She reincarnated as the daughter of the elf patriarch, Potimas. Using a unique skill that tells her the reincarnations' pasts, presents, and futures, she has been scouring the world for her students and securing them at the elf village. However, the skill comes with the caveat that she cannot freely talk about it, forcing her to keep secrets and causing those she wishes to protect to distrust her. Also, unbeknownst to her, she is being manipulated herself into gathering the reincarnations by Potimas, who is planning to experiment on them.

=== Hugo ===
Hugo Baint von Renxandt (ユーゴー・バン・レングザンド, Yūgo Ban Renguzando) / Natsume Kengo (夏目 健吾, Kengo Natsume)
Voiced by: Kaito Ishikawa (Japanese); Xander Mobus (English)
One of the classmates. He reincarnated as the crown prince of Renxandt Empire. Already egotistical in his previous life, his new royal upbringing turned him into a megalomaniac who tried to assassinate Shun out of jealousy for his popularity, but failed and got stripped of his skills by Ms. Oka. However, rather than realizing the error of his ways like she hoped, this prompted him to make a deal with the demons to overthrow the Analeit Kingdom and attack the Elf Village as revenge, only to end up being brainwashed by White into aiding her group in their shadow war against the elves before being cast aside once his usefulness had run out. After the timelines converge and the brainwashing gets undone, he finally escapes from his megalomania and becomes repentant of his previous actions.

=== Yuri ===
Yuri Ullen (ユーリーン・ウレン, Yūrīn Uren) / Yuika Hasebe (長谷部 結花, Hasebe Yuika)
Voiced by: Aimi Tanaka (Japanese); Laura Post (English)
One of the classmates. She reincarnated into a poor family who left her to the Word of God church, where she eventually became a Saint. Scared and alone, she clung to the only Japanese-speaking thing around her: the system voice of the world's RPG system. This, along with her upbringing, turned her into a religious fanatic. After the church starts aiding Hugo, she is brainwashed by him into joining his side as well.

=== Kunihiko ===
Kunihiko Tagawa (田川 邦彦, Tagawa Kunihiko)
Voiced by: Sōma Saitō
One of the classmates. He reincarnated in a nomadic tribe alongside his childhood friend Asaka, whom he had always had a crush on. However, one day, their village got destroyed by Merazophis, leaving them as the only survivors. Afterward, he became an adventurer to become stronger and get revenge. He and Asaka are eventually found by Filimøs and brought to the Elf Village, where they join Shun's party.

=== Asaka ===
Asaka Kushitani (櫛谷 麻香, Kushitani Asaka)
Voiced by: Ayane Sakura
One of the classmates. She reincarnated in a nomadic tribe that regularly raided demon lands alongside her childhood friend Kunihiko, whom she had always had a crush on. However, one day, their village got destroyed by Merazophis, leaving them as the only survivors. Afterward, she followed Kunihiko as he became an adventurer to watch over him. She and Kunihiko are eventually found by Filimøs and brought to the Elf Village, where they join Shun's party.

=== Sajin ===
Sajin (サジン) / Shinobu Kusama (草間 忍, Kusama Shinobu)
Voiced by: Nobunaga Shimazaki
One of the classmates. He reincarnated as the son of a Word of God church black ops member and thus naturally became one himself as well, though his talkative personality clashes with his job. He aids Hugo due to the church allying itself with him.

== Supporting ==
=== Julius ===
Julius Zagan Analeit (ユリウス・ザガン・アナレイト, Yuriusu Zagan Anareito)
Voiced by: Junya Enoki (Japanese); Landon McDonald (English)
The previous Hero as well as the second prince of the Analeit Kingdom and Shun's older brother, whom the latter greatly looked up to. He once faced White in the main storyline, set 15 years ago, which left him with mild arachnophobia. When war broke out between the humans and demons, he was killed by a mysterious girl in white later revealed to be White.

=== Hyrince ===
Hyrince Quarto (ハイリンス・クォート, Hairinsu Kwōto)
Voiced by: Kazuyuki Okitsu (Japanese); Griffin Puatu (English)
Julius' best friend and the only member of his party who survived their encounter with the mysterious girl in white later revealed to be White. Afterward, he joined Shun's party and began acting as a mentor-like figure for him. It is later revealed that he is actually a clone of Güliedistodiez created to grant him some reprieve from his duties. After the timelines converge, he is taken captive by Ariel.

=== Yana ===
Yaana (ヤーナ, Yāna)
The previous Saint and a member of Julius' party. She had an obvious crush him but he opted not to reciprocate her feelings out of fear that he might die and leave her alone. When war broke out between human and demonkind, she sacrificed herself to protect Julius from a colossal spider monster.

=== Jeskan ===
Jeskan (ジスカン, Jisukan)
A former adventurer and a member of Julius' party. He joined the group after becoming inspired by the young Hero's ideals and acted as a mentor-like figure to them. When war broke out between human and demonkind, he died alongside Hawkin from injuries he sustained while fighting the 1st demon army commander.

=== Hawkin ===
Hawkin (ホーキン, Hōkin)
A former gentleman thief and a member of Julius' party. At some point, he was captured and sold to Jeskan as a slave. Despite this, however, they grew to have a trusted master-servant relationship and he joined the group simply because Jeskan did so as well. When war broke out between human and demonkind, he died alongside Jeskan from injuries he sustained while fighting the 1st demon army commander.

=== Anna ===
Anna (アナ, Ana)
Voiced by: Larissa Tago Takeda
Shun's maid and the person who raised him after his mother passed away. She is a half-elf who left the Elf Village due to persecution and ended up becoming the court magician of the Analeit Kingdom for several generations before retiring. She cares for Shun as if he were her own child and followed him on his journey to the Elf Village despite the physical and mental toll it took on her. After the timelines converge, she is taken captive by Ariel.

=== Ronandt ===
Ronandt Orozoi (ロナント・オロゾイ, Ronanto Orozoi)
Voiced by: Nobuo Tobita
The court mage of the Renxandt Empire who is widely regarded as humanity's strongest magic caster. Initially arrogant, he was greatly humbled following a near-death encounter with White. Afterward, he developed an unhealthy infatuation with her and became obsessed with getting stronger, though he eventually remembered why he sought strength in the first place – to protect people – and subsequently became Julius and Aurel's magic instructor. After the timelines converge, he sides with Shun to find a way to save the world to where no one would have to be sacrificed.

=== Buirimus ===
Buirimus (ブイリムス, Buirimusu)
A monster tamer and an officer in the Renxandt Empire military. He was sent to investigate a monster outbreak caused by White scaring away all the dungeon's monsters, only to have his entire squad wiped out by her and subsequently be demoted for failure. Later learning that his child, who is one of the classmates, was kidnapped, he desperately sought an achievement to return home. However, this prompted him to enslave Razu-Razu and his subsequent abuse of the goblin awakened his unique skill, resulting in him being killed by his own tamed monster.

=== Aurel ===
Aurel Stadt (オーレル・シュタット, Ōreru Shutatto)
A magician of the Renxandt Empire and Ronandt's apprentice. She was born into a low-ranking noble family that desperately sought to marry her off to improve their status. However, she instead ended up becoming Ronandt's retainer and later apprentice after he realized her talent, though she expresses annoyance with the workload. She is also a childhood friend of Julius and seemed to have had a crush on him.

=== Felmina ===
Felmina (フェルミナ, Ferumina)
White's second-in-command in the tenth demon army. She was originally a noble who attended the same class as Sophia at the demon academy and planned to assassinate her after she accidentally <Charmed> all the male students and effectively took over the school. However, her <Charmed> fiancé, Wald, saw through her plan and had her stripped of her status. Afterward, though, she was taken in by White and became extremely devoted to her. Due to working for White, she learned of the state of the planet and supports her plan to destroy the RPG system.

=== Wald ===
Wald (ワルド, Warudo)
An officer in the tenth demon army and Felmina's ex-fiancé. He is a noble who attended the same demon academy class as Sophia where he constantly unsuccessfully tried to beat her and eventually developed a one-sided crush on her. Unfortunately, after joining the military, he ended up becoming the weakest member of the army even after he desperately had Sophia turn him into a vampire. Due to working for White, he learned of the state of the planet and supports her plan to destroy the RPG system.

=== Sariel ===
Sariel (サリエル, Sarieru)
Voiced by: Kikuko Inoue (Japanese); TBA (English)
A high-ranking god who takes on the form of an angel and the true identity of the system voice, as well as Ariel's adoptive mother and Güliedistodiez's love interest. After humanity nearly destroyed the planet once by draining its life to use it as an energy source, she agreed to become the core of the world's RPG system so the people could atone for their sins by giving them skills to develop, which would be taken back upon their deaths and converted into energy to heal the world. However, at present, she is approaching her limit and is dying, which would kill all of humanity as well. Ariel and White plan to destroy the RPG system, which would save her whilst minimizing damage by only killing half of humanity, whereas Güliedistodiez and Dustin intend to let her die and for the former to take her place, maintaining the status quo but only delaying the inevitable.

== Antagonists ==
=== Araba ===
Araba (アラバ)
A powerful earth dragon that inhabited the same dungeon as White. It encountered her several times and even destroyed her nest once, traumatizing her with its overwhelming power, but always letting her go due to not considering the spider to be worth its attention. However, this proved to be a mistake that would cost the dragon its life, as this prompted her to become strong and claim her revenge. Toward the end of their final battle, the earth dragon opted to let White kill it after being pushed into a corner, choosing to die with pride rather than struggle in vain.

=== Mother ===
Mother (マザー, Mazā)
A colossal spider-type monster that gave birth to White. The two did not have a good relationship, with her trying to cannibalize her as soon as she was born, forcing her to flee, and later attempting to control her using a psychic link she has with her offspring. This prompted White to use their connection to eat away at her soul, slowly weakening her and prompting her to send her other offspring to attack her. During their final battle, despite being severely weakened, she managed to lure White and nearly killed her, only being defeated when she used her own stolen strength against her.

=== Potimas ===
Potimas Harrifenas (ポティマス・ハァイフェナス, Potimasu Haaifenasu)
Voiced by: Toshiyuki Morikawa
The Main antagonist of the series and the patriarch of the elves as well as Ariel and Filimøs' father. Initially presented as a supporting character in the prolepsis, where he helped Filimøs search for her students, he is later revealed to actually be a narcissistic mad scientist with a god complex who is obsessed with attaining immortality and drains the planet's lifeforce to power his inventions. In reality, he only helped secure the reincarnations to use them as guinea pigs in his experiments and even killed the ones he considered dangerous. Shortly after the timelines converged, he is killed by Ariel during the Demons' attack on the Elf Village.

=== Dustin ===
Dustin LXI (ダスティンLXI, Dasutin LXI)
Voiced by: Takashi Matsuyama
The pontiff of the Word of God religion who caused the war that destroyed Sophia's home in the main story and aided Hugo in the prolepsis. He has lived for centuries using a unique skill that allows him to reincarnate with his memories intact when he dies. Despite his horrible actions, however, he genuinely acts for humanity's greater good and is fully aware of how depraved he is, but already views himself as "irredeemable". He later takes on more of a supporting role by cooperating with White and Ariel to defeat their common enemy: Potimas. However, he is opposed to their plan to destroy the world's RPG system, as half of humanity would die from the backlash, and is secretly working with Güliedistodiez to stave off the collapse by sacrificing the gods instead, which would only delay the inevitable,

=== Cylis ===
Cylis (サイリス, Sairisu)
The first prince of the Analeit Kingdom and one of Shun's older half-brothers. Though the crown prince, he was privately worried about being disinherited by his more talented siblings. As a result, when this exact scenario came to pass when his father made Shun his heir after he became the new Hero to keep the latter away from the battlefield, it prompted him to ally himself with Hugo and launch a coup d'etat by killing the king whilst framing his brother. Afterward, however, Hugo brainwashed him and broke his mind to erase evidence of his involvement.

== Demons ==
- After the timelines coverage, the surviving demons (except Darad) oppose Shiraori's plan to destroy the world's RPG system, as half of demonkind would die from the backlash.

=== Balto ===
Balto Phthalo (バルト・フィサロ, Baruto Fisaro)
Voiced by: Yūichirō Umehara (Japanese); Billy Kametz (English)
Ariel's right-hand man and the de facto ruler of the demons in her absence. While opposed to her warmongering, he is forced to support her out of fear that she would otherwise turn her overwhelming strength on demonkind instead.

=== Bloe ===
Bloe Phthalo (ブロウ・フィサロ, Burō Fisaro)
Voiced by: Subaru Kimura
Balto's younger brother and the commander of the 7th Demon Army. Out of all the commanders, he was the most vocally opposed to Ariel's warmongering, though he never acted on his words. He also had a crush on White, which was obvious to everyone except her. He was killed by Julius when war broke out between humans and demonkind.

=== Agner ===
Agner Ricep (アーグナー・ライセップ, Āgunā Raiseppu)
Voiced by: Takuya Kirimoto
The commander of the 1st Demon Army. While playing the role of loyalist, he was actually secretly undermining Ariel's rule by supporting rebellions. However, White exposed his plot, forcing him to truly support Ariel. He was killed by Julius' party when war broke out between the human and demonkind.

=== Sanatoria ===
Sanatoria (サーナトリア, Sānatoria)
Voiced by: Sayaka Ōhara
The commander of the 2nd Demon Army. She is opposed to Ariel's warmongering and secretly formulating a rebellion against her. However, the demon lord is fully aware of her plot and views her as no threat.

=== Kogou ===
Kogou (コゴウ, Kogō)
Voiced by: Shun Fujii
The commander of the 3rd Demon Army. Despite being a large and physically imposing man, he is actually a shy, peace-loving individual. Because of this, he is opposed to Ariel restarting conflict with humanity but is too scared of her to take action himself, prompting him to join Sanatoria's rebellion.

=== Darad ===
Darad (ダラド, Darado)
The commander of the 5th Demon Army. He is the only pure-blood demon genuinely loyal to Ariel.

=== Huey ===
Huey Guidek (ヒュウイ・ギデク, Hyūi Gideku)
The commander of the 6th Demon Army. While opposed to Ariel's warmongering, he was ultimately too scared of her to ever act on it. He was killed by Ronandt when war broke out between humans and demonkind.

== Dragons ==
=== Gakia ===
Gakia (ガキア)
The ruler of the earth dragons who inhabited the same dungeon as White. It had a very honorable personality, believing it is natural for "the old generation to make way for the new one". Because of this, it took offense to Ariel "coming out of nowhere" and trying to kill White and subsequently fought her, leading to its death. Afterward, Güliedistodiez gave its corpse to White to consume, believing it was what it would have wanted.

=== Hyuvan ===
Hyuvan (ヒュバン, Hyuban)
The ruler of the wind dragons. Despite its status as the ruler of its sub-species, it has a very punkish attitude, often causing it to get into comedic arguments with Ariel. However, it remains absolutely loyal to Güliedistodiez, who he refers to as "boss". After the timelines converged, it initially sided with Güliedistodiez against White, but later decides to help Shun find a way to save the planet where no one would have to die.

=== Nia ===
Nia (ニーア, Nīa)
The ruler of the ice dragons. It has a very haughty and somewhat snobbish attitude, causing Ariel to consider it the "most annoying" of the dragon rulers. It also had somewhat of a rivalry with Wrath, having fought him several times while he was on a rampage induced by his unique skill. After the timelines converged, it initially sides with Güliedistodiez against White, but later decides to help Shun find a way to save the planet where no one would have to die.

=== Reise ===
Reise (レイス, Reisu)
The ruler of the darkness dragons and the former guardian of the Demon Lord's Sword, a one-time-use weapon crafted by D that can only be wielded by the Demon Lord and can kill even a god. However, since the sword has already been used by the previous Demon Lord and Hero in a failed attempt to assassinate D, it now serves as Güliedistodiez's second-in-command in the ninth demon army. Also, unlike the other dragon rulers, it was not created by Güliedistodiez but instead a result of an experiment by Potimas: a combination of his DNA with a dragon's. After the timelines converged, it initially sided with Güliedistodiez against White, but later decides to help Shun find a way to save the planet where no one would have to die.

=== Byaku ===
Byaku (ビャク)
The ruler of the light dragons and the guardian of the Hero's Sword, a one-time-use weapon crafted by D that can only be wielded by the Hero and can kill even a god. The sword was discovered by Julius and the dragon allowed him to take it, as he was the Hero, binding itself to the blade to continue watching over it. After Julius' death, the sword came into Shun's possession, who remains unaware of both its true nature and its occupant.

=== Iena ===
Iena (イエナ)
The ruler of the water dragons and Nia's older sibling. After the timelines converged, it sided with Güliedistodiez against White. It is killed whilst fighting Sophia and Wrath.

== Reincarnations ==
=== Sachi ===
Sachi Kudou (工藤 沙智, Kudō Sachi)
Voiced by: Kanae Itō
The class representative and de facto leader of the classmates at the Elf Village. She was reincarnated into a poor family who sold her to the elves when she was just a baby. She is also openly critical of Ms. Oka due to her many secrets.

=== Kenichi ===
Kenichi Ogiwara (荻原 健一, Ogiwara Ken'ichi)
Voiced by: Shogo Sakata
One of the classmates held at the Elf Village. Unbeknownst to the elves and his fellow reincarnations, he is actually a spy working for the Word of God church.

=== Saki ===
Saki Temarikawa (手鞠 川咲, Temarikawa Saki)
Voiced by: Ikumi Hasegawa
One of the classmates held at the Elf Village. She reincarnated as the daughter of Buirimus and was abducted by the elves when she was just a baby.

=== Issei ===
Issei Sakurazaki (桜崎 一成, Sakurazaki Issei)
One of the deceased classmates, nicknamed "Ichi". In his previous life, he was Hugo's best friend. He was killed by the elves as they deemed his unique skill, to create dungeons, to be too dangerous.

=== Naofumi ===
Naofumi Kogure (小暮 直史, Kogure Naofumi)
One of the deceased classmates. In his previous life, he was a crybaby who got teary-eyed over the tiniest of things. He died when the village he was reincarnated in was attacked by monsters.

=== Kouta ===
Kouta Hayashi (林 康太, Hayashi Kōta)
One of the deceased classmates. In his previous life, he was a member of the tennis club. He died in an accident when he was still a baby, which is what prompted Ms. Oka to start securing her students at the Elf Village.

=== Aiko ===
Aiko Iijima (飯島愛子, Iijima Aiko)
One of the classmates held at the Elf Village, nicknamed "Ai". In her previous life, she was friends with Fei.

=== Kumiko ===
Kumiko Tonooka (外岡 久美子, Tonōka Kumiko)
One of the classmates held at the Elf Village, nicknamed "Himi". In her previous life, she was friends with Fei.

=== Dai ===
Dai Tsushima (津島 大, Tsushima Dai)
One of the classmates held at the Elf Village. He does not know how to read a room.

=== Ren ===
Ren Aikawa (相川 恋, Aikawa Ren)
One of the classmates held at the Elf Village. He is silently troubled by the fact that he has never had a girlfriend in either of his lives.

=== Maki ===
Shuuto Maki (槙 将羽登, Maki Shūto)
One of the classmates held at the Elf Village. He is troubled by there being more girls than boys in the village all whilst being oblivious that one of his fellow reincarnations, Mio, has a crush on him.

=== Mio ===
Mio Furuta (古田 未央, Furuta Mio)
One of the classmates held at the Elf Village. She secretly has a crush on fellow reincarnate Maki.

=== Shuuko ===
Shuuko Segawa (瀬川 柊子, Segawa Shūko)
One of the classmates held at the Elf Village. She was a fan of shoujo manga in her previous life.

=== Chie ===
Chie Nanase (七瀬 千恵, Nanase Chie)
One of the classmates held at the Elf Village. She is seen as a motherly figure by her fellow reincarnates.

== Others ==
=== Body-Brain, Magic-Brain #1 & Magic-Brain #2 ===
Body-Brain (体担当, Karada Tantō), Magic-Brain #1 (魔法担当一号, Mahō Tantō Ichi-go) & Magic-Brain #2 (魔法担当二号, Mahō Tantō Ni-go)
Voiced by: Aoi Yūki (anime), Sumire Uesaka (PV & CM) (Japanese); Brianna Knickerbocker (English)
A trio of separate personalities of White created through the <Parallel Minds> skill that kept her company during her time in the dungeon. Each had her own twist on her personality: body-brain had a macho persona, magic-brain #1 a show-offish persona, and magic-brain #2 a timid persona. Unfortunately, each of them met their demise at some point: body-brain was absorbed by Ariel whilst White was forced to kill the magic-brains after they became corrupted following the battle against Mother.

=== Nightmare's Vestiges ===
Nightmare's Vestiges (悪夢の残滓, Akumu no Zanshi)
Voiced by: Aoi Yūki
A new spider monster species that are White's offspring created through the <Egg Laying> skill. They possess intelligence on par with a human, communicate through telepathy, and are absolutely loyal to their "Mother/Master". Despite their fearsome reputation, however, they are generally docile towards humans unless provoked.

=== Meiges Derra Analeit ===
Meiges Derra Analeit (メイゲス・デラ・分析する, Meigesu Dera Analeito)
The ruler of the Analeit Kingdom and Shun's father. He deeply cared for his children, to the point of being heartbroken following Julius' death and making Shun his heir after he became the new Hero to keep him off the battlefield. Unfortunately, this prompted his firstborn, Cylis, to ally himself with Hugo and the demons and rebel against him, leading to his death. It is later revealed, in the main story, that he had been brainwashed by Potimas, forcing White to have him killed since she had no method of breaking it.

=== Leston ===
Leston (レストン, Resuton)
The third prince of the Analeit Kingdom and one of Shun's older half-brothers. Despite renouncing his claim to the throne, he was captured during Cylis' rebellion and sentenced to be executed. Fortunately, Shun and his party managed to rescue him. Afterward, he opted to stay behind in the Kingdom to restore it to order.

=== John Keren ===
John Keren (ジョン・ケレン, Jon Keren)
Sophia's father and the count of Keren County. After White build a nest in his territory, he tried not to anger the dangerous monster whilst simultaneously trying to appease foreign diplomats, who wanted the spider for themselves. However, his actions ended being for naught, as the Word of God Religion used White as a casus belli and declared war. He was killed when his home was attacked by enemy forces, but not before he ordered the family butler, Merazophis, to take Sophia and flee.

=== Seras Keren ===
Seras Keren (セラス・ケレン, Serasu Keren)
Sophia's mother and the countess of Keren County. An avid follower of the Goddess Religion, she became convinced that White was a Divine Beast send by Sariel after she saved her and Sophia from some bandits on a whim. She was killed when her home was destroyed in a war, but not before she ordered the family butler, Merazophis, to take Sophia and flee.

=== Meido ===
Meido (冥土)
A high-ranking god who takes on the form of a Japanese beauty in a maid outfit. She is the only one who can physically silence D and put a stop to her antics.
