= Laura Post =

American voice actress

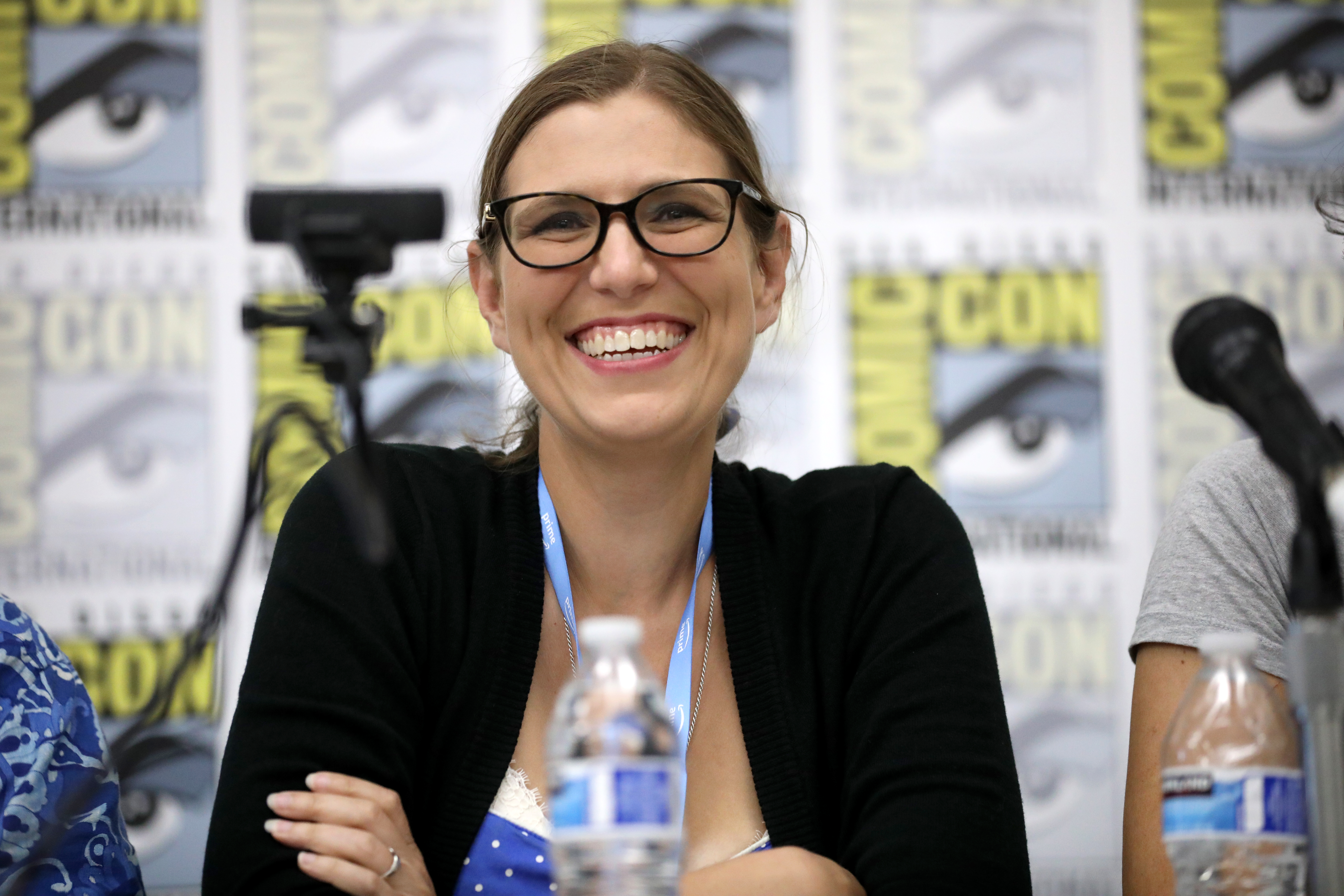
- Post in 2023
- Education: Columbia College Chicago
- Occupations: Voice actress; voice director
- Years active: 2008–present
- Website: laurapost.net

Laura Post is an American voice actress and voice director who provides voices for English versions of Japanese anime series and video games. She is best known for her roles as Aria Lieze in Magical Girl Lyrical Nanoha A's, Ragyo Kiryuin in Kill la Kill, Rosalia in Sword Art Online, Eri Watabe in Lagrange: The Flower of Rin-ne, Blizzard in One Punch Man, Bosbos in Redline, and Witch Regret in Edens Zero. She also has portrayed characters in video games like Ahri in League of Legends, Queen Azshara in World of Warcraft: Cataclysm, Haruka Sakaki in Godzilla: The Planet Eater, Yelan in Genshin Impact, Valentine in Skullgirls, Harley Quinn in Batman: The Enemy Within, Sumire Yoshizawa in Persona 5 Royal, and Arfoire in Hyperdimension Neptunia. She often serves as a voice double for Tina Fey.

== Biography ==
Post said she was interested in voice acting when she was a kid. Post said she "didn't pursue voice overs" until she went to her first anime convention and was inspired by "a bunch of panels on voice overs", saying: "That's what I wanted to do when I was a little kid! I'm gonna go to all the panels, I'm gonna take notes, and I'm gonna try this out!".

Post graduated from Columbia College Chicago in 2007. She was also taught by various voice actors like Steve Staley, Tony Oliver, Huck Ligget, Bob Bergen, Bill Holmes, and Richard Steven Horvitz. Post started out by providing voices in audio dramas, as well as for commercials, documentaries, and industrial work.

== Filmography ==
=== Anime ===
List of voice performances in anime
Year	Title	Role	Notes	Source
2009	Magical Girl Lyrical Nanoha A's	Aria Liese, Rynith, Reinforce II		
2010	Squid Girl	Cindy Campbell	Season 1	
2012	Lagrange: The Flower of Rin-ne	Eri Watabe		
2012	Love Live! School Idol Project	Nozomi Tojo		
2013	Gargantia on the Verdurous Planet	Ridget		Press
2013	Pokémon Origins	Red's Mom, Marowak		Press
2013	Sword Art Online	Rosalia		Press
2014	Knights of Sidonia	Various characters		Press
2014-18	Yo-kai Watch	Rebecca Forester	(Season 1–2)	
2015	Hyperdimension Neptunia: The Animation	Arfoire		
2015	Kill la Kill	Ragyo Kiryuin		
2015	Sailor Moon Crystal	Tellu, Queen Nehelenia, others	Viz Media dub	
2016	March Comes In like a Lion	Akari Kawamoto		
2016	One-Punch Man	Blizzard		
2016	Kuromukuro	Paula Kowalczyk		
2017	Little Witch Academia	Diana Cavendish	TV series	
2017	Stitch & Ai	Jiejie, Aunt Daiyu		
2017	Anohana	Toko Yadomi		
2018	Last Hope/Unit Pandora	Queenie Yoh		Netflix
2019	The Promised Neverland	Isabella (Mom)		
2019	Cells at Work!	Macrophage		
2019	Demon Slayer: Kimetsu no Yaiba	Tamayo		
2020	Ghost in the Shell: SAC_2045	Ada Byron, Car AI	Netflix dub	
2020	BNA: Brand New Animal	Melissa Horner	Netflix dub	
2020	Great Pretender	Cynthia Moore	Netflix dub	
2020	Re:Zero − Starting Life in Another World	Naoko Natsuki		
2020-present	Jujutsu Kaisen	Mai Zenin, Nobuko Takada, Tengen, young Naoya		
2021	Vivy: Fluorite Eye's Song	Grace		
2021	The Way of the Househusband	Miku	Netflix dub	
2021	Sailor Moon Eternal	Queen Nehelenia	Movie	
2021	Yashahime: Princess Half-Demon	Sesshōmaru's Mother		
2021	Record of Ragnarok	Brunhilde (Brünnhilde)	Netflix dub	
2021	Edens Zero	Witch Regret	Netflix dub	
2021	King's Raid: Successors of the Will	Selene		
2021	Platinum End	Saki Hanakago	Crunchyroll dub	
2021	Pokémon Evolutions	Kuni		
2022	Lycoris Recoil	Saori Shinohara		
2022	Pokémon: Hisuian Snow	Additional voices		
2023	Zom 100: Bucket List of the Dead	Beatrix Amerhauser	English dub	
2024	Tower of God 2nd Season	Hwaryun	Crunchyroll dub	
2024	Ranma ½	Kasumi Tendo		
2026	The Elusive Samurai	Shiba Ienaga		

=== Animation ===
List of voice performances in animation
Year	Title	Role	Notes	Source
2016	Justice League Action	Big Barda, Circe		
2017	Voltron: Legendary Defender	Commander Trugg	Seasons 4 - 5	Tweet
2018	Freedom Fighters: The Ray	Little Girl, Mom, Resistance Gunner		
2020	The Jungle Bunch to the Rescue	Natacha	Season 3	
2024	Megamind Rules!	Roxanne Ritchi	Replacing Tina Fey	

=== Films ===
List of voice performances in direct-to-video and television films
Year	Title	Role	Notes	Source
2012	Redline	Bosbos		
2013	Little Witch Academia	Diana Cavendish	2 films	
2014	Giovanni's Island	Sawako		Press
2015	Love Live! The School Idol Movie	Nozomi Tojo		
2016	Your Name	Miki Okudera		
2017	Justice League Dark	Business Woman		
2017	Gantz: O	Reika Shimohara		
2017	In This Corner of the World	Suzu Urano		
2018	Godzilla: The Planet Eater	Haruka Sakaki		
2019	Millennium Actress	Eiko Shimao	Eleven Arts re-dub	
2019	Astro Kid	Mum		
2020	Cuties	Assistant Principal		Netflix Credits
2020	Violet Evergarden: Eternity and the Auto Memory Doll	Miss Lancaster, Additional Voices		Netflix Credits
2020	A Whisker Away	Kaoru Mizutani	Netflix dub	
2021	Poupelle of Chimney Town	Claire		
2023	Lego Marvel Avengers: Code Red	Betty Ross / Red She-Hulk, additional voices	Disney+ special	
2024	Megamind vs. the Doom Syndicate	Roxanne Ritchi	Replacing Tina Fey	

=== Video games ===
List of voice performances in video games
Year	Title	Role	Notes	Source
2009	League of Legends	Ahri		Press
2010-11	World of Warcraft: Cataclysm	Queen Azshara		Website
2012	Guild Wars 2	Norn Female		Press
2012	Skullgirls	Valentine, Ileum		
2012	World of Warcraft: Mists of Pandaria	Shademaster Kiryn, Snow Blossom		Press, website
2014	The Evil Within	Laura Victoriano, Laura (Monster), Es		
2014	Bravely Default	Olivia		
2014	Smite	Bellona, Nox, Sun's Bride Chang'e and Soulless Machine Sol		Resume
2015	Final Fantasy XIV	Moenbryda		
2016	Titanfall 2	Facility AI		
2016	Killing Floor 2	Ana Larive		
2016	Fallout 4: Nuka-World	Mags Black		Tweet
2016	Trillion: God of Destruction	Faust		Tweet
2016–17	World of Warcraft: Legion	Queen Azshara, Drelanim Whisperwind		Website
2017	Mobius Final Fantasy	Meia		
2017	Fire Emblem Heroes	Silvia	Post-launch role	Tweet
2017–18	Batman: The Enemy Within	Harley Quinn, Agency Female 2, Riddler's Computer, GCPD 2		Tweet
2018	Octopath Traveler	Primrose Azelhart		
2018-19	World of Warcraft: Battle For Azeroth	Queen Azshara		Tweet
2019	A Hat in Time: Nyakuza Metro	The Empress	DLC Antagonist	Tweet
2019	Fire Emblem: Three Houses	Catherine		
2019	Pokémon Masters	Flannery, Cheryl		Tweet
2019	Daemon X Machina	Rose Queen		
2019	Indivisible	Phoebe		
2020	Vitamin Connection	Z-Space Scientist, Meteor Malady, Bacteria Bat		
2020	One-Punch Man: A Hero Nobody Knows	Blizzard		
2020	Persona 5 Royal	Kasumi Yoshizawa, Sumire Yoshizawa, Cendrillon		
2020	Granblue Fantasy Versus	Zooey		
2020	Guardian Tales	Aisha, Catherine		
2020	13 Sentinels: Aegis Rim	Yuki Takamiya		Tweet
2020	Sakuna: Of Rice and Ruin	Sakuna, Toyohana		In-game credits
2020	The Elder Scrolls Online	Arana		Tweet
2021	Cookie Run: Kingdom	Sea Fairy Cookie, Professor		
2021	Story of Seasons: Pioneers of Olive Town	Additional voices		In-game credits
2021	Nier Replicant ver.1.22474487139...	Additional voices		
2021	Shin Megami Tensei III: Nocturne HD Remaster	Yuko Takao, Aradia, Lady in Black		
2021	Scarlet Nexus	Kodama Melone, Yuta Melone		
2021	Akiba's Trip: Hellbound & Debriefed	Rei "Mother Soul" Anekoji		
2021	Nier Reincarnation	Akeha		
2021	Demon Slayer: Kimetsu no Yaiba – The Hinokami Chronicles	Tamayo		
2021	Shin Megami Tensei V	Joka, Nuwa		
2022	Lost Ark	Blackfang		
2022	Stranger of Paradise: Final Fantasy Origin	Sophia		
2022	Rune Factory 5	Child		
2022	Chocobo GP	Atla		
2022	Genshin Impact	Yelan		
2022	AI: The Somnium Files – Nirvana Initiative	Tokiko Shigure		
2022	Fire Emblem Warriors: Three Hopes	Catherine		
2022	Star Ocean: The Divine Force	Malkya Trathen		
2023	Fire Emblem Engage	Yunaka		
2023	Octopath Traveler II	Additional voices		
2023	Trinity Trigger	Kratelle, Libras		
2023	Omega Strikers	Estelle		
2023	The Legend of Heroes: Trails into Reverie	Erika Russell, Ilya Platiere, Soldiers & Citizens of Zemuria		
2023	Rune Factory 3 Special	Hazel, Yue		
2023	Persona 5 Tactica	Sumire Yoshizawa	Repaint Your Heart DLC	
2023	Silent Hope	Rogue		
2023	Granblue Fantasy Versus: Rising	Zooey, Grand Order		
2024	Like a Dragon: Infinite Wealth	Additional voices		
2024	Persona 3 Reload	Ms. Ounishi		
2024	Granblue Fantasy: Relink	Historiath		
2024	Unicorn Overlord	Dinah		
2024	Demon Slayer: Kimetsu no Yaiba – Sweep the Board	Tamayo		
2024	Shin Megami Tensei V: Vengeance	Nuwa		
2024	Farmagia	Lisan, Charlot, additional voices		
2025	Like a Dragon: Pirate Yakuza in Hawaii	Additional voices		
2025	Marvel Rivals	Emma Frost		
2025	Rune Factory: Guardians of Azuma	Sakuna		
2025	Date Everything!	Sophia		
2025	Raidou Remastered: The Mystery of the Soulless Army	Herald of Yatagarasu		
2025	Demon Slayer: Kimetsu no Yaiba – The Hinokami Chronicles 2	Tamayo		
2025	Sushi Ben	Minami, Ofukuro		
2025	The Outer Worlds 2	Additional voices		
2025	Octopath Traveler 0	Primrose Azelhart		
2026	The Legend of Zelda: Ocarina of Time	Impa		
