= Narenare: Cheer for You! =

Japanese anime television series

- Key visual featuring the six main characters

菜なれ花なれ (Nanare Hananare)
- Genre: Coming-of-age; Sports (Cheerleading)
- Created by: P.A. Works; DMM.com
- Anime television series
- Directed by: Kōdai Kakimoto
- Written by: Kōdai Kakimoto; Yuniko Ayana; Midori Gotō
- Music by: Naoki Tani
- Studio: P.A. Works
- Licensed by: Crunchyroll
- Original network: TXN (TV Tokyo), BS TV Tokyo, AT-X
- Original run: July 7, 2024 – September 23, 2024
- Episodes: 12
- icon

Narenare: Cheer for You! (菜なれ花なれ, Nanare Hananare; lit. 'Be a Vegetable, Be a Flower') is an original Japanese anime television series produced by P.A. Works, set in Takasaki, Maebashi and Numata, Gunma. The series is written and directed by Kōdai Kakimoto, featuring original character designs by Tomomi Takada which were adapted into anime designs by Kanami Sekiguchi, and a script written by Kakimoto, Yuniko Ayana, and Midori Gotō. It aired from July to September 2024.

== Plot ==
Kanata Misora, a high school girl living in Gunma Prefecture, was once part of a skilled cheerleading team, but retired following an accident, now being unable to jump. One day, she meets Suzuha Obunai, a high school girl skilled in parkour. When the two become friends, Kanata decides to return to cheerleading, forming with Suzuha a group called PoMPoMs with four other girls: Anna Aveiro, Nodoka Ōtani, Shion Tanizaki, and Megumi Kaionji.

== Characters ==
Kanata Misora (美空 かなた, Misora Kanata)
Voiced by: Rika Nakagawa
She is a first-year student at Takanosaki High and is skilled in acrobatics. She loves natto and watching movies. She was a member of a championship-winning cheerleading team in junior high school, but quit following an incident.
Suzuha Obunai (小父内 涼葉, Obunai Suzuha)
Voiced by: Yuki Nakashima
First year student at Sakurajo Girls School. Skilled in parkour and bouldering.
Anna Aveiro (杏那・アヴェイロ)
Voiced by: Larissa Tago Takeda
First year student at Omaebashi High School. Skilled at capoeira and desktop music. Her father died when she was young. She is a frequent visitor of a local record store.
Nodoka Ōtani (大谷 穏花, Ōtani Nodoka)
Voiced by: Manaka Iwami
First year student at Omaebashi High School. Skilled in yoga.
Shion Tanizaki (谷崎 詩音, Tanizaki Shion)
Voiced by: Moe Kahara
First year student at Sakurajo Girls School. Skilled in rhythmic gymnastics.
Megumi Kaionji (海音寺 恵深, Kaionji Megumi)
Voiced by: Miku Itō
A friend of Misora who uses a wheelchair but still is part of the cheerleading group.
Noichigo Izawa (伊沢 野苺, Izawa Noichigo)
Voiced by: Azusa Tadokoro
Hana Nabatame (生天目 華, Nabatame Hana)
Voiced by: Yūna Kitahara
Hiiragi Kanzaki (神崎 柊, Kanzaki Hiiragi)
Voiced by: Rikako Aida
Miyabi Kushida (櫛田 雅, Kushida Miyabi)
Voiced by: Yū Serizawa
Mari Aieda (愛江田毬, Aieda Mari)
Voiced by: Kana Ichinose

== Production and release ==
In November 2023, DMM.com and P.A. Works announced they were producing an original anime television series titled Narenare: Cheer for You! It aired from July 7 to September 23, 2024, on TV Tokyo and its affiliates. An advance screening of the first three episodes was held on March 17, 2024, at Takasaki Denkikan, Takasaki. The opening theme song is "Cheer for You!", while the ending theme song is "With", both performed by PoMPoMs (Rika Nakagawa, Yuki Nakashima, Larissa Tago Takeda, Manaka Iwami, Moe Kahara, Miku Itō). Crunchyroll streamed the series worldwide outside of Asia.

=== Episodes ===
No.	Title	Directed by	Written by	Storyboarded by	Original release date
1	"Front Tuck Somersault Full Twist Layout"; Transliteration: "Kakaekomi, Ichi Kai Chūgaeri, Ichi Kai Hineri Hiraki Ashi, Ichi Kai Shin Mi, Ichi Kai Hineri" (Japanese: 抱え込み1回宙返り1回ひねり開脚一回伸身1回ひねり)	Yuriko Abe	Kōdai Kakimoto	Kōdai Kakimoto	July 7, 2024
2	"Anyway, Something Like That..."; Transliteration: "Tte Kanji de..." (Japanese: って感じで...)	Tomoko Hiramuki	Kōdai Kakimoto	Kōdai Kakimoto & Masayoshi Nishida	July 14, 2024
3	"I Always Look This Way"; Transliteration: "Itsumo Kono Kao Dakara" (Japanese: いつもこの顔だから)	Megumi Soga	Yuniko Ayana	Kenichi Imaizumi	July 21, 2024
4	"Capoeira Rhapsody"; Transliteration: "Kapoeira Rapusodi" (Japanese: カポエイララプソディ)	Kenichi Suzuki	Midori Gotō	Kenichi Suzuki	July 28, 2024 (Note: This episode aired at 11:55 p.m. JST, 10 minutes after the original air time.)
5	"An Exuberant Carnival Dance"; Transliteration: "Arittake Kānibaru Ondo" (Japanese: ありったけカーニバル音頭)	Yasuyuki Ōishi	Midori Gotō	Megumi Soga	August 4, 2024
6	"No Cheer at the Hot Springs"; Transliteration: "Onsen de Chia wa Ikemasen" (Japanese: 温泉でチアはいけません。)	Yōhei Fukui	Yuniko Ayana	Gōichi Iwahata	August 11, 2024
7	"Stylish × Styleless!"; Transliteration: "Haikara × Bankara!" (Japanese: ハイカラ×バンカラ！)	Kiyoto Nakajima	Yuniko Ayana	Tomomi Umetsu	August 18, 2024
8	"What a busy summer"	Tomoaki Ōta	Midori Gotō	Tomomi Umetsu	August 25, 2024
9	"Rain and Cheer"; Transliteration: "Ame to Chia" (Japanese: 雨とチア)	Yuriko Abe	Midori Gotō	Toshiya Shinohara	September 1, 2024
10	"Go Fight Win"	Shigenori Awai	Midori Gotō	Gōichi Iwahata	September 8, 2024
11	"Na-nare"; Transliteration: "Na Nare" (Japanese: 菜なれ)	Satoshi Nagao	Midori Gotō	Kosaku Taniguchi	September 16, 2024 (Note: This episode aired at 12:21 a.m. JST, 36 minutes after the original air time.)
12	"Hana-ni-nare"; Transliteration: "Hana ni Nare" (Japanese: 花になれ)	Megumi Soga	Yuniko Ayana	Tomomi Umetsu & Kōdai Kakimoto	September 23, 2024 (Note: This episode aired at 12:15 a.m. JST, 30 minutes after the original air time.)

== See also ==
- Katana Maidens: Toji No Miko, whose anime adaptation is also directed by Kōdai Kakimoto
- List of BanG Dream! episodes, starting from the second season, Kōdai Kakimoto became the director of the BanG Dream! anime series
- Komada: A Whisky Family, an anime film produced by P.A. Works with original character designs by Tomomi Takada
