= Invisible Woman (Marvel Rivals) =

- Marvel Rivals character
- Invisible Woman's appearance in Marvel Rivals
- First game: Marvel Rivals (2025)
- Based on: The Invisible Woman by Stan Lee and Jack Kirby
- Voiced by: Suzie Yeung

In-universe information
- Class: Strategist
- Origin: United States of America
- Nationality: American

The Invisible Woman (Chinese: 隱形女; pinyin: Yǐnxíng Nǚ) is the superhero identity of Susan Storm (苏姗·斯托姆; Sūshān Sītuōmǔ), a character in the 2024 video game Marvel Rivals developed by the Chinese company NetEase Games. Introduced in a 2025 update, she is based on the Marvel Comics character of the same name created by Stan Lee and Jack Kirby in 1961, and is the wife of Reed Richards. Due to exposure from cosmic rays, she has the ability to generate force fields, as well as turn invisible. In the game's continuity, she assists the other heroes against the villain Dracula. Susan is voiced by Suzie Yeung.

The character was well received upon debut, and called a breakout success of the game. Much praise was voiced regarding her design, and she has been the frequent subject of fan creations. The character has also seen some controversy however, with media outlets questioning the overreliance on using her sex appeal and drawing issue with her depiction in some advertisements for Rivals, as well as an issue of the game's development team recycling designs. In terms of gameplay, Susan has been praised for her versatility, and used as a talking point to compare the strengths of Marvel Rivals to Blizzard Entertainment's hero shooter, Overwatch.

== Conception and design ==
The original Invisible Woman character was created by Stan Lee and Jack Kirby in 1961, introduced as the female co-protagonist of the Fantastic Four comic. Created for Marvel Comics, it revolved around a superhero team of the same name, consisting of Sue Storm-Richards, her husband Reed Richards, brother Johnny Storm, and friend Ben Grimm. According to Danny Koo, executive producer at Marvel's licensing branch Marvel Games, they were implemented into the game Marvel Rivals by NetEase Games to help bring awareness of the group as a whole. Describing the group as "characters that had no limelight", he felt in particular that the Invisible Woman was not a recognizable character to the public until her reveal for the game.

In Rivals, while Invisible Woman is her callsign, the character is typically referred to by her name Susan Storm. Standing 170 centimetres (5 ft 7 in) tall, she is a slender woman with blue eyes and shoulder-length blonde hair parted across her brow. Earrings dangle from her ears, while her outfit consists of a blue and white jumpsuit with a "4" across her left upper chest. White gloves cover her hands while a belt covers her waist, and armor plating protects her shoulders and knees. Koo stated that Susan's design emphasized how they were able to showcase Marvel characters in the game instantly through body shape and silhouette, so players could instantly recognize them and what their abilities were.

Twitch streamer Alanya "ARUUU" Alisha falsely claimed on social media website Twitter that she had served as the body model for the character. Stating that she had previously provided body scans for the character Psylocke in the game, she pointed out similarities between her figure and Susan's, particularly in regards to buttocks. She further claimed to have called the development team out of curiosity, and that they had confirmed the use of her body scan data for the model. Despite the lack of an official statement from NetEase, several news sites referenced it as fact, including PC Gamer, Rolling Stone, and Japanese website Inside Games. However, Automaton Media later confirmed the claims as false, adding that Alisha was not affiliated with Marvel in any way.

Like other Rivals characters, Susan received skins, unlockable cosmetic items to change her in-game appearance. When designing these, they wanted to attract "contemporary players", and as a result took careful consideration to innovate and create something they felt would resonate with modern tastes. In particular, the "Malice" skin took inspiration from a storyline in the mainstream Marvel Comics continuity, in which she develops an evil alter-ego for a time. The outfit gives her red eyes, a black and red color scheme, various spikes, and straps dangling from her body. Meanwhile, her swimsuit skin references a connected storyline in the comics, featuring a one-piece sleeved swimsuit with various cutouts across it, particularly across the chest to help make the "4" shape.

== Appearances ==
Voiced by Suzie Yeung, this version of Susan Storm first appeared in a January 2025 update for the hero shooter Marvel Rivals. Modified by cosmic rays on a cellular level, she gained the ability to generate force fields and turn herself invisible, adopting the superhero name Invisible Woman. She uses these abilities to help fight against the vampire Dracula and his undead army.

In Rivals's gameplay, Susan is classified as a Strategist, a support-based role meant to provide healing and buffs to allies. Her main weapon, "Orb Projection", sends a projectile that flies outward before returning back to her, and can pierce through multiple targets as it travels, healing allies and dealing damage to enemies. Meanwhile, she has a passive ability dubbed "Covert Advance" that allows her to go invisible while not in combat for a period of time, giving her health regeneration as well. She can also utilize a mobility technique called "Veiled Step", which allows her to jump twice in the air and turns her invisible for a short period of time.

Susan also has several abilities that can be activated at will. "Agile Strike" is a melee attack that deals consecutive strikes while pushing enemies back at the end. Meanwhile, "Force Physics" will either push or pull enemies in a fixed line in front of Susan, depending on the player's choice. "Psionic Vortex" creates a temporary singularity at a fixed point that will pull enemies towards it, damaging them while in its proximity. "Guardian Shield" can create a force field in front of an ally that absorbs damage until it breaks, and heals allies within it. While active, the shield can also be moved around, but has a cooldown period when it breaks or is manually withdrawn before it can be used again. Lastly her Ultimate ability, "Invisible Boundary", needs to be charged before use. The ability charges slowly during the course of gameplay, and once full the ability can be activated to create a cylindrical area of effect zone that temporarily provides healing and will make allies inside of it invisible to any enemies outside. Susan also team-up abilities with the other Fantastic Four members, with the mechanic a core component of Rivals gameplay.

== Promotion and controversy ==
Since her debut, the character has been used in advertisements for the game on social media websites such as Reddit and TikTok. In a cross-promotion for the Marvel Studios produced film Fantastic Four: First Steps, the cast of the film was invited to play their counterparts in Marvel Rivals, with actress Vanessa Kirby playing as Susan and joking about the in-game appearance. In September 2025, the mainstream Fantastic Four comic book used the Malice skin's design for the look of a evil alternate universe version calling herself The Invincible Woman. The design was featured as an alternate cover art for several issues of the comic as well, with the sixth issue featuring a code to redeem an in-game cosmetic item.

The advertising campaigns for the game drew some controversy, with Olivia Richman writing for The Escapist stating that advertisements featuring female characters like Susan often relied heavily on their sexuality. She added this made the game feel desperate for player attention by comparison, further emphasized by the game's predominantly male player community. Meanwhile, one ad in particular on TikTok featured Susan in the Malice skin, with the caption suggesting that players "abuse" her. This was interpreted as encouraging sexual violence by the Ad Standards Community Panel in Australia who saw it as a breach of advertising ethics, while fans questioned if it was making light of domestic abuse.

Tessa Kaur in an article for TheGamer commented on the ad, noting that while the use of "abuse" in that context was meant for players to utilize a character some would see as overpowered upon introduction, the oversexualization of the outfit and her pose in the ad coupled with the implication of the wording was inappropriate for the platform. She felt the use of the Malice skin was an issue all its own, as in the comics it originated from the character suffering a miscarriage. While Kaur acknowledged the "sex sells" trope in advertising, she opined there was a larger issue in how the game treated its female characters overall.

== Critical reception ==
The Malice skin factored significantly into Susan's positive reception, albeit with some controversy. The developers designed it around themes of darkness and anger, but also wanted it to embody strength and beauty to avoid portraying her as a "cheap monster". Marvel's mainline comics later reused it for an evil alternate universe Invisible Woman.

The character's debut in Rivals was well received, considered a breakout star by GamesRadar+ writer Dustin Bailey. Search results related to the character on Google rose by 3000% after the trailer's reveal. PC Gamer's Wes Fenlon and Elie Gould acknowledged that while some of those searches were possibly people looking into the character's comic book history, they attributed some of the public response to the Malice skin which they described as having "sent the playerbase into a bit of a frenzy when it first came out, for obvious reasons". They additionally felt while NetEase would not state so directly, the company was likely intending such a response due to how detailed their character models were.

Miguel Varela of MeriStation observed fans praised her sex appeal, with some appreciating how faithful her design was to the original comics while others felt she looked stylish in a futuristic outfit. The staff of Inside Games shared this observation, stating that much of the player response focused on the character's backside, particularly due to her skin tight suit emphasized her figure, and resulted in a large amount of fan art on Twitter. They additionally noted the positive response to the Malice skin, calling it "racy" and that the "darkness in this work has a very sexy design".

While Yahoo Games editor "MrSun" in an article for their Taiwanese branch observed similar reactions, he cited that some were also surprised that this was the official character model and not a user-created modification. Praising NetEase's "exquisite and delicate character design", he felt the character's figure reflected her appearance in the comics. He also praised the implementation of the Malice skin, describing it as recreating the high-slit outfit design of the original and working well with Rivals' in-game presentation. He further noted fans expressing their belief that the Chinese-developed character design was not something European and American designers could readily match.

In addition to fan art and cosplay, the character has also been a frequent subject of third party pornography. Alyssa Mercante in an article for Rolling Stone attributed some of this content to how NetEase appeared to lean into the innate sexiness of its characters, citing in particular streamer ARUUUU's claims, but also stressing the impact of the Malice skin, which she described as a "one-piece, high-cut bikini that reveals her butt cheeks". While Mercante acknowledged some of the problematic aspects of its depictions within the comics, she felt the development team's use of the outfit helped represent a "level of tongue-in-cheek sexuality and playfulness for Rivals that is unparalleled in other contemporary online games" in how they embraced these sexualized depictions.

=== Criticisms towards design ===
Some however were critical of her design. The character's sexualization, particularly in regards to her Malice skin, resulted in accusations of actively playing into sex appeal, with some fans suggesting that Rivals was a "gooner game" due to feeling the female cast were over-sexualized. Responding to these criticisms, the game's creative director Guangyun Chen expressed that many of the designs were meant to directly reference depictions of the characters in the comics, with the caveat of creating "more fashionable designs" to gain player appreciation, something he felt was reflected in fan response.

In November 2025, dataminers discovered that one of the game's cosmetic items, a "nameplate" players could equip on their account, featured a dress-wearing Susan in an animation that was partially cut off in-game, with the full animation showing her lying back and the crotch of her underwear visibly presented. Despite the full image not appearing in-game, Rhiannon Bevan of TheGamer felt that the original intention may have been a step too far in terms of sexualization, and represented a contrast between how men and women are sexualized in the game, with male sexuality often emphasizing strength or used to comedic effect.

Meanwhile, players found her difficult to differentiate from fellow character Dagger, due to both being similar looking, slender blonde women with blue and white colored outfits. This was exacerbated further with the release of Emma Frost in the title, whose design shared similar traits. Eric Hodges in an article for ComicBook.com described it as a problem of the developers' own making, pointing out that the developers were aware of the similarity between the characters in how they joked about it with in-game banter between the characters. He further expressed his confusion as to how it came about, as in the comics the character typically wore a single-colored light blue outfit. Hodges further felt that being accurate to comic book designs was not an accurate excuse in this instance.

Ian Dean of Creative Bloq observed that each of the three characters had the same "heart-shaped face, delicate nose, pouty lips and tussled, wavy blonde hair", leading them to joke the development team may have a type. He said that while it was important to put personality front and center in character design, the uniqueness of the characters did feel diluted, and suggested that due to successes with characters such as Susan, the development team might have been trying to double down on what worked before. Dean stated that while the game had a distinct artistic style that worked for them, he felt in order to win over casual and diehard comic book fans, the development team would eventually have to address the issue.

=== Analysis of gameplay ===
Tyler Colp of Polygon expressed that while Susan was defined as a support-type character, she played significantly differently than other support characters in the hero shooter genre, including within Rivals itself. He found it refreshing to have a character designed that "can solve the sorts of problems healing can't handle", even if the tradeoff was that they were significantly more difficult to use, likening it to a pilot being aware of what all the individual controls in a plane do. Comparing her to support characters in Blizzard Entertainment's Overwatch, where characters often had to utilize their abilities in tandem, Susan's indicated that the Rivals team was pressing in the opposite direction, allowing players to ignore some of the abilities as needed.

Ravi Sinha of GamingBolt meanwhile felt this versatility was one of the reasons Rivals was able to overshadow Overwatch, praising the game for avoiding a focus on having all the characters be designed for optimal balance and curtailing player experience. Elaborating, he pointed out that Susan's ability to generate shields and either push or pull other characters were not typical for a character classified as a support-class, which was mainly associated with healing teammates. But in the same vein, Sinha expressed none of these abilities felt out of place on the character, and instead helped to expand her role.
