= Rika Nakagawa =

Japanese actress (born 1998)

- 中川 梨花
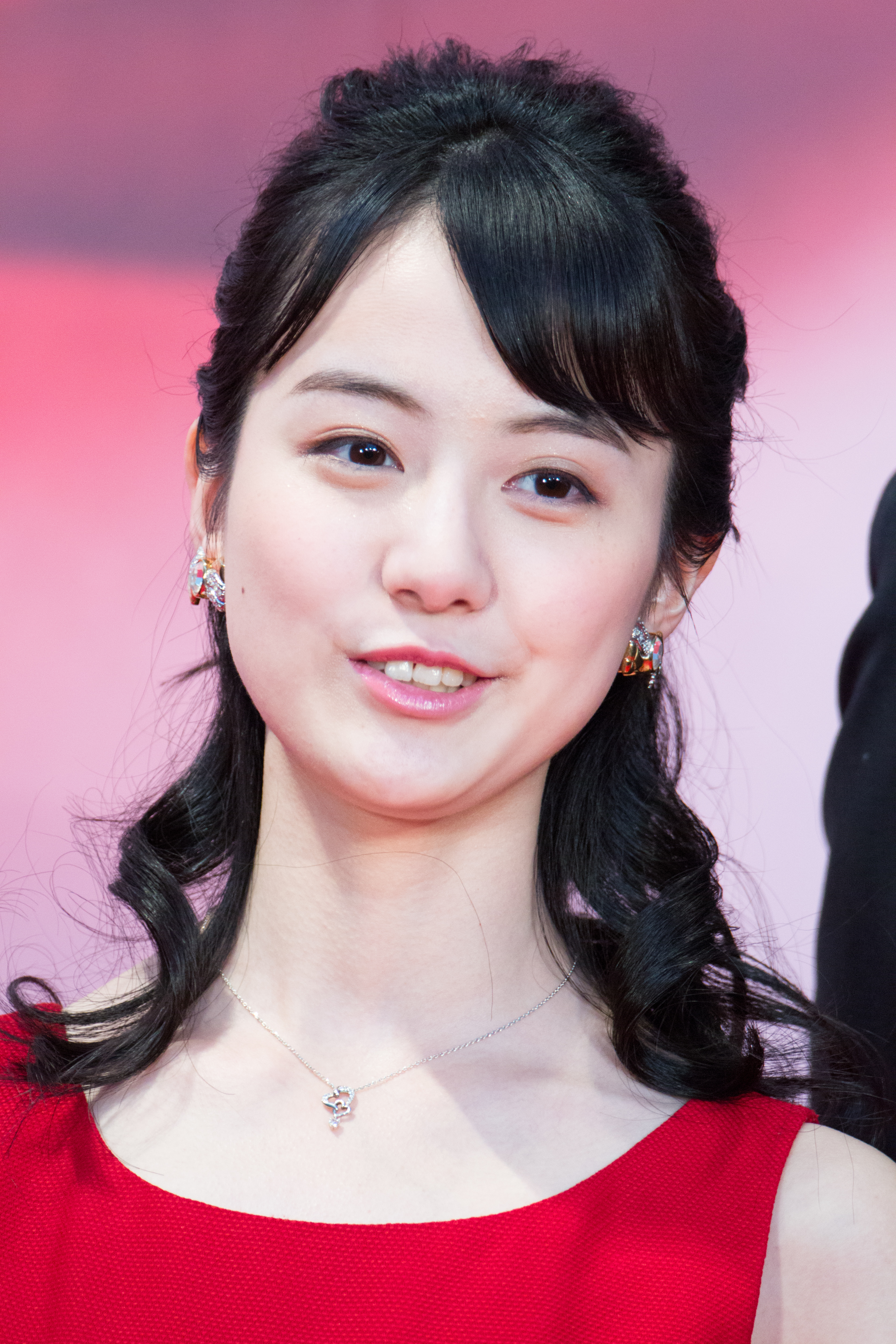
- Nakagawa at the 2017 Tokyo International Film Festival
- Born: April 21, 1998 (age 28); Sapporo, Hokkaido, Japan
- Education: Keio University
- Occupation: Actress
- Years active: 2011–present
- Agent: Sun Music Production

Rika Nakagawa (中川 梨花, Nakagawa Rika; born April 21, 1998) is a Japanese actress and singer who is affiliated with Sun Music Production. Starting her career as a member of a Hokkaido-based idol group, she also appeared in various television shows and events in Hokkaido before moving to Tokyo to continue her career while studying at Keio University. She portrayed Momiji Itō in the mixed-media project Shine Post, as well as Kanata Misora, the protagonist of the anime series Narenare: Cheer for You!

== Career ==
Nakagawa started her career as a member of the Hokkaido-based idol group Peaceful. While in her second year of junior high school, she decided to apply for talent auditions through the magazine Monthly De View, ultimately deciding to affiliate with Sun Music Production.

Nakagawa participated in Kodansha's annual Miss iD talent audition in 2014, where she was one of the semi-finalists. She also began modeling for magazines such as Shueisha's Weekly Young Jump from 2014. She appeared in HTB's Hiragashi Garakuta-Dan variety program in 2015 and 2016, as well as hosting the TV Hokkaido program Switchin! from April 2016 to September 2017. As an active high school student, in August 2016 she participated in a national speech competition organized by the Ministry of Education, Culture, Sports, Science and Technology in Hiroshima, where she won the top prize in the debate category. She appeared in the 2017 film Shashin Kōshien 0.5-Byō no Natsu; her work in the film led her to delaying taking university entrance exams.

After graduating from high school, Nakagawa moved to Tokyo to further her entertainment career and pursue higher education, enrolling at Keio University's Faculty of Policy Management in 2017. She was also appointed as ambassador for Higashikawa, Hokkaido, in 2019. She was cast as Momiji Itō in the mixed-media project Shine Post. In 2024, she voiced Kanata Misora, the protagonist of the anime television series Narenare: Cheer for You!; she and her co-stars also performed the series' opening theme "Cheer for You!" and ending theme "With" under the name PoMPoMs.

== Filmography ==
=== Anime ===
- Shine Post (2022) as Momiji Itō
- Narenare: Cheer for You! (2024) as Kanata Misora
