= Emma Frost (Marvel Rivals) =

- Marvel Rivals character
- Emma Frost's appearance in Marvel Rivals
- First game: Marvel Rivals (2025)
- Based on: Emma Frost by Chris Claremont and John Byrne
- Designed by: Liu Shuting and "Roast Goose"
- Voiced by: Laura Post

In-universe information
- Species: Human mutant
- Class: Vanguard
- Origin: United States of America
- Nationality: American

Emma Frost (Chinese: 艾玛·弗斯特; pinyin: Àimǎ Fúsītè) is a character in the 2024 video game Marvel Rivals, a third-person hero shooter developed by the Chinese company NetEase Games. Introduced in a 2025 update, she is based on the Marvel Comics character of the same name, a mutant created by Chris Claremont and John Byrne. The Rivals version of Emma is voiced by Laura Post, and orchestrates an event called the Hellfire Gala on the island of Krakoa. After it and its inhabitants are transported into the future, she tries to protect her fellow mutants.

The character was well received for her design and role in the game. She went viral, with commentary focused on her large thighs, while her ability to chokeslam enemies drew comparisons to a domme. Some criticized her design as sexualized, though with some defense that aspects like her height and build were important to her in-game role. Others complained that her appearance was too similar to other characters, leading to confusion during gameplay.

== Conception and development ==
Emma's appearance went through multiple iterations during the planning process, with early versions having a ponytail.

The original Emma Frost was conceived by writer Chris Claremont and artist co-writer John Byrne for Marvel Comics in January 1980, as part of its Uncanny X-Men comic book series. A mutant with psychic abilities, she was initially an enemy of the mutant group the X-Men, but later aligned herself with them. The character and her design were inspired by the television show The Avengers and its episode "A Touch of Brimstone", in which the character Emma Peel dons the persona "Queen of Sin". Peel's outfit as the Queen consisted of a provocative corset, collar, and boots; these elements were incorporated into Emma's character design.

A version of the character was added to the NetEase developed game Marvel Rivals, and re-imagined by concept artists Liu Shuting and "Roast Goose". Shuting saw her as exuding "confidence with her alluring and mature presence", while wanting to capture her leadership qualities from her comic depictions. In said comics, she has the ability to change her body into a diamond-like form; this was adapted in the game with additional visual effects to give her a "unique combat aesthetic", while her movements in this form were meant to reflect a wrestler.

=== Design ===
Emma stands 190 centimetres (6 ft 3 in) tall. She is a blonde woman with a bob cut hairstyle that frames her face, and has blue eyes and lips. Her outfit consists of a white sleeved leotard with blue highlights that exposes her upper chest, crystal shoulderpats, and a twinned coattail extending from the back mean to resemble a diamond. She wears two white heeled boots that extend halfway up her leg, and have a large blue X on each extending just below the knee. Her outfit's color palette was meant to reflect the appearance of a diamond, with tailored cuts to make her look more elegant, and sparkling effects were added to her movements to create a sense of lightness and energy. Meanwhile, the large crystal shoulder pads were intended to emphasize her authority.

Several designs were considered during development, with the initial concept having long hair pulled back into a ponytail, while the outfit itself was planned to have rose gold highlights instead of blue. Instead of coattails, a cape was considered extending from her back, while the X-pattern on her outfit was meant to be emphasized more. Diamond embedded gloves and fur trimmings were also considered. Meanwhile, her diamond form would have taken on a blue coloration, and caused visible spiked protrusions. As development progressed, they shifted to a more pronounced pear-shaped figure, though the ponytail idea persisted late into the design phase.

Like other Rivals characters, Emma received skins, unlockable cosmetic items to change her in-game appearance. In particular, the "X-Revolution" skin is based off her appearance in the first issue of the 2013 Uncanny X-Men comic, featuring a black outfit that leaves most of her torso exposed saved for a jacket and vest hugging her breasts, while giving her a pompadour hairstyle. Meanwhile, her "Hellfire Protocol" skin features a mostly dark-blue color scheme, and changes her outfit to have thigh high leggings, a collar that extends up the neck, and long hair pushed behind her.

== Appearances ==
Emma Frost is a character in the 2024 third person hero shooter Marvel Rivals, introduced in a 2025 update. She is voiced by Laura Post.

=== Gameplay ===
When designing her animations, the development team wanted to illustrate a balance between elegance and power, with her projectile attacks being launched by punches. This was to emphasize her curves, but also to give her movements a fierce rhythmic strength. Her Carbon Crush ability required additional attention, as it had to be tailored for each character individually due to their different sizes and shapes.

== Promotion and reception ==
To promote the character and the game, Emma Frost was featured in social media and YouTube advertisements for the title. However, some noticed that these depictions of the character differed from her in-game representation, namely censoring the character's chest with a black mesh in all her outfits. This cause some confusion amongst viewers, as other characters with similarly revealing outfits had not received the same treatment, and led to accusations of false advertising.

Her debut was well received, with ComicBook.com writer Justin Joy stating that her character design and role as a female Vanguard made a huge impact on the fanbase. A significant amount of discussion revolved around her thighs, with Andy Chalk of PC Gamer referencing the "thick thighs save lives" meme and observing how players were trying to figure out if her design was muscular or solely thick. Scott Duwe of Destructoid stated that Emma went viral on social media after debut, and search results for "thighs" during this time on those platforms brought up commentary and fan art of her, much of which was of erotic nature. Duwe felt the response was highly deserved, adding "she looks like she could leg press the Hulk and The Thing at the same time". GamesRadar+'s Dustin Bailey observed how in some matches players disengaged from regular gameplay and instead lined up to be chokeslamed by another player using Carbon Crush ability on each of them. While he felt the move was very much akin to the wrestling technique of the same name, he cited it was more due to the appeal of a tall woman delivering the attack. Journalist Ana Valens in an article for Vice described her as "fanservice off the charts" due to the amount of jiggle physics incorporated into her design, but also her portrayal as a domme style of character due to her chokeslam and presentation. Valens stated it made her interested in reinstalling the game just to engage this aspect.

Some however were critical of her design. The character's sexualization resulted in some accusing the game of actively playing into sex appeal, with some suggesting that Rivals was a "gooner game" due to the over-sexualization of its cast. Valens, despite her own praise, felt that game was leaning too hard into sexualization, and felt player responses to Emma only further highlighted that. Responding to these criticisms, the game's creative director Guangyun Chen expressed that many of the designs were meant to directly reference depictions of the characters in the comics, with the caveat of creating "more fashionable designs" to gain player appreciation, something he felt was reflected in fan response. Vika Rosa of IGN Brasil argued that while Emma's design was faithful to the aesthetic she carried in the comics, she felt it furthered the debate on how men and women are often portrayed in games, and an issue of fan service aimed at differing audiences. She pointed out that much of the argument revolved around player response as well, and that while some drew issue with heavy sexualization, others engaged in the generation of content that sexualized them further, referencing the large amount of fan-made pornographic content developed around Blizzard Entertainment's own hero shooter, Overwatch.

In contrast, Andrés Aquino of Gfinity eSports felt that her physique served a more practical purpose in terms of gameplay. Emphasizing her thighs specifically, Aquina argued that while the character was far more "bulky" than other media depictions of the character, it helped visually illustrate to characters what her role in the game was meant to be, as "tank" archetype characters tended to have visually large frames to indicate their ability to withstand significant damage. This was further indicated by her height, which was taller than many other characters in the cast and drew comparisons to characters Junker Queen or Zarya of Overwatch. While he acknowledged fanservice was likely also a factor, he felt this argument for changing design for function had some precedence, pointing to Family Guy character Peter Griffin's more muscular portrayal in the game Fortnite.

Meanwhile, players found her difficult to differentiate from fellow characters Dagger and the Invisible Woman, due to all three being similar looking, slender blonde women with blue and white colored outfits. Eric Hodges in an article for ComicBook.com described it as a problem of their own making, pointing out that the developers were aware of the similarity between the characters in how they joked about it with in-game banter between the characters. He further expressed his confusion as to how it came about, as typically in the comics the character had platinum blonde hair and a solid white outfit. Hodges further felt that being accurate to comic book designs was not an accurate excuse in this instance. Ian Dean of Creative Bloq further observed that each of the three characters had the same "heart-shaped face, delicate nose, pouty lips and tussled, wavy blonde hair", leading them to joke the development team may have a "type". He said that while it was important to put personality front and center in character design, the uniqueness of the characters did feel diluted, and suggested that due to successes with characters such as the Invisible Woman, the Rivals development team might have been trying to double down on what worked before. Dean stated that while the game had a distinct artistic style that worked for them, he felt in order to win over casual and diehard comic book fans, the development team would eventually have to address the issue.
