= Komada: A Whisky Family =

2023 Japanese animated film

- Theatrical release poster
- Directed by: Masayuki Yoshihara
- Written by: Yukito Kizawa; Soue Nakamoto
- Starring: Saori Hayami; Kensho Ono; Maaya Uchida; Yoshimasa Hosoya
- Music by: Tatsuya Kato
- Production company: P.A. Works
- Distributed by: Gaga
- Release dates: June 11, 2023 (Annecy International Animation Film Festival); November 10, 2023
- Running time: 91 minutes
- Country: Japan
- Language: Japanese

Komada: A Whisky Family (Japanese: 駒田蒸留所へようこそ, Hepburn: Komada Jōryūjo e Yōkoso) is a 2023 Japanese animated film directed by Masayuki Yoshihara, and written by Yukito Kizawa and Soue Nakamoto. It was produced by P.A. Works and distributed by Gaga. The film debuted at Annecy International Animation Film Festival in June 2023, before a theatrical release in November.

== Synopsis ==
Rui Komada is a female president working at the family's whisky facility: the Komada Distillery. After her father died, her brother, Kei, works on a different facility due to family issues. To restore her family's financial status and surpass her father, Rui names her signature for the whisky, "Koma".

== Voice cast ==
| Characters | Japanese | Description |
|---|---|---|
| Rui Komada | Saori Hayami | A female successor of the Komada Distillery, Kei's sister, and Miō's daughter. |
| Kōtarō Takahashi | Kensho Ono | A rookie journalist assigned to reveal information about the whisky industry. |
| Tomoko Kawabuta | Maaya Uchida | A distillery supporter and associate working for Rui. |
| Hiroshi Yasumoto | Yoshimasa Hosoya | Kōtarō's manager and editor-in-chief for the website "News Value Japan". The character is mistaken for the voice actor Hiroki Yasumoto. |
| Rindo Tōkai | Shinpachi Tsuji | A distillery veteran employee. |
| Yūsuke Saitō | Kenichi Suzumura | Kōtarō's close friend. |
| Kō Komada | Kenyu Horiuchi | A distillery founder, Miō's husband, and the grandfather of Rui and Kei. |
| Miō Komada | Kikuko Inoue | The mother of Rui and Kei, and a distillery accountant. |
| Kei Komada | Yuichi Nakamura | Rui's estranged brother, Miō's son, and an employee of the Ōmori company. |

== Production ==
The film is produced by P.A. Works. It was directed by Masayuki Yoshihara, Yukito Kizawa and Soue Nakamoto wrote the screenplay, Tomomi Takada designed the characters, and Tatsuya Kato composed the music. Saori Hayami performed the film's main theme song, "Dear My Future".

== Release ==
The film premiered at the Annecy International Animation Film Festival in June 2023, competing in the Contrechamp category. Gaga released the film in Japanese theaters, and it premiered on November 10, 2023. The film is billed as "the fifth installment in [P.A Works'] 'workplace' series about people and their jobs, after Hanasaku Iroha, Shirobako, Sakura Quest, and The Aquatope on White Sand.

== See also ==
- Narenare: Cheer for You!, an anime series produced by P.A. Works with original character designs by Tomomi Takada
