= Shine Post =

Japanese multimedia franchise

- First light novel volume cover, featuring Kyōka Tamaki

シャインポスト (Shain Posuto)
- Created by: Konami Digital Entertainment; Straight Edge
- Light novel

Shine Post: Nee Shitteta? Watashi o Zettai Idol ni Suru Tame no, Goku Futsū de Atarimae na, to Bikkiri no Mahou
- Written by: Rakuda
- Illustrated by: Buriki
- Published by: ASCII Media Works
- Imprint: Dengeki Bunko
- Original run: October 8, 2021 – present
- Volumes: 3
- Manga
- Written by: Rakuda
- Illustrated by: Makiko Kawasemi
- Published by: Media Factory
- Magazine: Monthly Comic Alive
- Original run: January 27, 2022 – November 26, 2022
- Volumes: 2
- Anime television series
- Directed by: Kei Oikawa
- Written by: SPP; Tatsuto Higuchi; Rakuda
- Music by: Yasunori Nishiki; Tsubasa Ito
- Studio: Studio Kai
- Licensed by: Sentai Filmworks: SEA: Plus Media Networks Asia; SA/SEA: Bilibili (streaming rights, canceled)
- Original network: Nippon TV, AT-X, BS NTV, BS12 TwellV
- Original run: July 13, 2022 – October 19, 2022
- Episodes: 12
- Video game

Shine Post: Be Your Idol!
- Developer: Konami Digital Entertainment
- Publisher: Konami Digital Entertainment
- Produced by: Akihiro Ishihara
- Platform: Nintendo Switch 2
- Released: June 5, 2025

Shine Post (シャインポスト, Shain Posuto) is a Japanese idol-themed mixed-media project created by Konami Digital Entertainment and Straight Edge. A light novel series written by Rakuda and illustrated by Buriki, titled Shine Post: Nee Shitteta? Watashi o Zettai Idol ni Suru Tame no, Goku Futsū de Atarimae na, to Bikkiri no Mahou, began publication by ASCII Media Works under their Dengeki Bunko imprint in October 2021. A manga series with art by Makiko Kawasemi was serialized in Media Factory's seinen manga magazine Monthly Comic Alive from January to November 2022, and a console game by Akihiro Ishihara developed by Konami Digital Entertainment was released for Nintendo Switch 2 in June 2025. An anime television series by Studio Kai aired from July to October 2022.

== Plot ==
Haru Nabatame, Kyōka Tamaki, and Rio Seibu are members of TiNgS, a struggling idol group that has seen limited attendance at its concerts. All three want to live up to Hotaru, a popular idol who inspired their idol dreams. They have been given an ultimatum: if they are unable to sell out the Nakano Sunplaza for their upcoming anniversary concert, TiNgS will be forced to disband. The trio find this difficult, given the small crowds at their prior lives. However, they catch the attention of Naoki Hinase, their new manager and secretly a friend of Hotaru. Inspired by Haru's determination and talent, Naoki aims to make TiNgS a top idol group and help them fulfill their goal of selling out the Nakano Sunplaza and thus avoiding disbandment and bankruptcy.

== Characters ==
=== TINGS ===
The unit's concept is the girls who sing the truth, are ideal, and noble girls. Their agency is Brightest Production, and they debuted one year after HY:RAIN. The audience was about 40 people, and their achievements include regularly holding live shows at their dedicated theater.

The group's name is taken from the first letter of each girl's family names. During the time Momiji and Yukine were away from the group, TINGS was spelled as TiNgS, with the lowercase letters representing the missing members.

Kyōka Tamaki (玉城 杏夏, Tamaki Kyōka)
Voiced by: Moeko Kanisawa (anime), Yui Ogura (game)
One of the members of TINGS. She has a calm personality, but will sometimes lash out at the others when needed. She is skilled in dancing.
Momiji Itō (伊藤 紅葉, Itō Momiji)
Voiced by: Rika Nakagawa
One of the members of TINGS. Due to a falling out, she and Yukine decided to leave TINGS and form a duo named YukiMoji, although they later rejoin TINGS.
Haru Nabatame (青天国 春, Nabatame Haru)
Voiced by: Sayumi Suzushiro
She is the protagonist of the series, and the leader of TINGS. She has a cheerful personality, and was inspired to become an idol after seeing Hotaru's concert. She wears glasses when not doing idol activities. She was formerly a member of HY:RAIN.
Yukine Gionji (祇園寺 雪音, Gionji Yukine)
Voiced by: Rimo Hasegawa (anime), Rie Takahashi (game)
One of the members of TINGS. Due to a falling out, she and Momiji decided to leave TINGS and form a duo named YukiMoji, although they later rejoin TINGS. Both of her parents are actors.
Rio Seibu (聖舞 理王, Seibu Rio)
Voiced by: Yūko Natsuyoshi
One of the members of TINGS. She's very confident about her abilities.

=== HY:RAIN ===
The unit's concept is to become idols beyond just idols. Their agency is Rainbow Management. They debuted one year before TINGS, and their audience reached around 10,000, and their achievements include solo concerts at Nippon Budokan.

Ren Kurogane (黒金 蓮, Kurogane Ren)
Voiced by: Yu Serizawa
The leader of HY:RAIN and Haru's childhood friend. She also goes to the same high school as her. She is disappointed Haru left HY:RAIN and seeks to bring her back to the group.
Aoba Karabayashi (唐林 青葉, Karabayashi Aoba)
Voiced by: Kurumi Takase (anime), Azusa Tadokoro (game)
Itoha's older sister, who has a cool personality.
Itoha Karabayashi (唐林 絃葉, Karabayashi Itoha)
Voiced by: Miyu Kubota
Aoba's younger sister.
Nanoka Hiumi (氷海 菜花, Hiumi Nanoka)
Voiced by: Tomoyo Takayanagi
Yawara Naekawa (苗川 柔, Naekawa Yawara)
Voiced by: Arisa Kōri

=== FFF ===
The unit's concept is idols who will soar into a new era. Their agency is Brightest Production. They debuted about three years before TINGS and, the audience was around 40,000, and their activity record was the dome tour.

Nanami Totsuka (兎塚 七海, Totsuka Nanami)
Voiced by: Iori Noguchi
She is the leader of FFF, which is currently the most popular group in Brightest.
Hinatsu Hinomoto (陽本 日夏, Hinomoto Hinatsu)
Voiced by: Hina Kino
Remy Nashinoki (梨子木 麗美, Nashinoki Remi)
Voiced by: Fairouz Ai

=== YuraYura Sisters ===
The unit's concept is idols attracting thousands of customers and represented by the Art Knowledge. They debuted about four years before TINGS, the audience was set at a target of 2 million people annually, with frequent live performances of various sizes, and their achievements include stadium-level solo.

Natalya (ナターリャ, Natārya)
Voiced by: Aoi Koga
Miina Hirose (広瀬 実唯菜, Hirose Miina)
Voiced by: Kiara Saitō

=== Himawari Symphony ===
An original idol unit for the game. They belong to Art Knowledge, one of the largest agencies in the industry, which appears in the game. The story begins when the perennial underage girls, who belong to a famous large idol group that has supported the idol industry along with "absolute idol" Hotaru, but have never been selected, are given the name "Himawari Symphony."

Airi Koromori (琴森 愛莉, Komori Airi)
Voiced by: Momo Sakurai
Nagi Agarie (東江 凪, Agarie Nagi)
Voiced by: Yui Ishikawa
Asuka Yakushin (薬師院 亜珠花, Yakushin Asuka)
Voiced by: Sora Tokui
Minato Minamizaki (南崎 湊, Minamizaki Minato)
Voiced by: Yuki Wakai

=== Laugh Diamond ===
The unit was announced as part of Konami's AI Singing Voice Library project, but was later revealed to also be a character appearing in the game. In the AI Singing Voice Library, the unit is set in a situation where they belong to a talent agency but are not allowed to debut, and the agency eventually goes bankrupt. This was a meta setting based on the real-life situation at the time when the game was not released and they could not appear.

Hibiki Tamura (篁 響季, Tamura Hibiki)
Voiced by: Anna Suzuki
Asahi Kazamatsuri (風祭 朝陽, Kazamatsuri Asahi)
Voiced by: Serina Kumazawa
Momoka Komurazaki (小紫 桃果, Komurasaki Momoka)
Voiced by: Mizuna Shirakawa
Kanon Yamada (山田 花音, Yamasa Kanon)
Voiced by: Ibuki Kido

=== Others ===
Hotaru (螢)
Voiced by: Ayaka Ōhashi
A popular idol who inspired all of TINGS' members to become idols. She often teases Naoki over the phone by telling him to "commit seppuku". She is called Kei by Naoki.
Yūki Hinase (日生 優希, Hinase Yūki)
Voiced by: Mikako Komatsu
The president of talent agency Brightest and Naoki's cousin. She took Haru into Brightest after the latter left HY:RAIN.
Homare Torawatari (虎渡 誉, Torawatari Homare)
Voiced by: Miyu Tomita
Eiko Kikuchi (菊池 英子, Kikuchi Eiko)
Voiced by: Atsumi Tanezaki
Hidehiko Katsuragi (葛城秀彦, Katsuragi Hidehiko)
Voiced by: Kana Hanazawa
Naoki Hinase (日生 直輝, Hinase Naoki)
Voiced by: Daiki Yamashita
TINGS' manager and Yuki's cousin. He has the ability to see people shining when they lie. He is good friends with Hotaru, whom he calls Kei.

== Media ==
=== Light novels ===
The Shine Post multimedia project began as a light novel series written by Rakuda and illustrated by Buriki. The series, titled Shine Post: Nee Shitteta? Watashi o Zettai Idol ni Suru Tame no, Goku Futsū de Atarimae na, to Bikkiri no Mahou (シャインポスト ねえ知ってた？ 私を絶対アイドルにするための、ごく普通で当たり前な、とびっきりの魔法, Shain Posuto: Nee Shitteta? Watashi o Zettai Aidoru ni Suru Tame no, Goku Futsū de Atarimae na, to Bikkiri no Mahou; "Shine Post: Did You Know? The Most Ordinary, Natural, and Unique Magic to Make Me an Absolute Idol"), began publication by ASCII Media Works under Dengeki Bunko imprint with on October 8, 2021. Three volumes have been released as of July 8, 2022.

No.	Release date	ISBN
1	October 8, 2021	978-4-04-914044-6
2	March 10, 2022	978-4-04-914346-1
3	July 8, 2022	978-4-04-914537-3

=== Manga ===
A manga series with art by Makiko Kawasemi was serialized in Media Factory's Monthly Comic Alive magazine from January 27 to November 26, 2022. Two tankōbon volumes were released between July 23 and December 22, 2022.

No.	Japanese release date	Japanese ISBN
1	July 23, 2022	978-4-04-681520-0
2	December 22, 2022	978-4-04-681965-9

=== Anime ===
An anime television series was announced on October 26, 2021. it is animated by Studio Kai and directed by Kei Oikawa, with SPP handling series composition, Tatsuto Higuchi and Rakuda, author of the light novel series, writing the scripts, Yoshihiro Nagata designing the characters, and Yōhei Kisara producing the music. Yasunori Nishiki and Tsubasa Ito composed the music. The series aired from July 13 to October 19, 2022, on Nippon TV's AnichU programming block and other networks. (Note: Nippon TV listed the series premiere at 25:29 on July 12, 2022, which is effectively 1:29 a.m. JST on July 13.) Sentai Filmworks licensed the series. On August 16, 2022, it was announced that the seventh episode and beyond would be delayed due to COVID-19.

==== Episode list ====
No.	Title (Note: All English titles are taken from HIDIVE.)	Directed by	Written by	Storyboarded by	Original release date
1	"Haru Nabatame Does Not Shine"; Transliteration: "Nabatame Haru wa 'Kagayakanai'" (Japanese: 青天国春は《輝かない》)	Taisuke Tsukuda	Rakuda	Kei Oikawa	July 13, 2022
2	"Haru Nabatame is 'Shaky'"; Transliteration: "Nabatame Haru wa 'Fuantei'" (Japanese: 青天国春は《不安定》)	Takumi Narita	Rakuda	Kei Oikawa	July 20, 2022 (Note: This episode aired at 2:19 a.m. JST, 50 minutes after the original air time.)
3	"Kyoka Tamaki the 'Foil'"; Transliteration: "'Hikitate-yaku' no Tamaki Kyōka" (Japanese: 《引き立て役》の玉城杏夏)	Arata Nishizuki	Rakuda	Takumi Narita	July 27, 2022
4	"Kyoka Tamaki Does Not Stand Out"; Transliteration: "Tamaki Kyōka wa 'Medatanai'" (Japanese: 玉城杏夏は《目立たない》)	Taisuke Tsukuda	Rakuda	Kei Oikawa	August 3, 2022
5	"'Headstrong' Rio Seibu"; Transliteration: "'Wagamama' na Seibu Rio" (Japanese: 《我侭》な聖舞理王)	Fumiaki Usui	Rakuda	Takumi Narita	August 10, 2022
6	"Rio Seibu Wants to be Praised"; Transliteration: "Seibu Rio wa 'Homeraretai'" (Japanese: 聖舞理王は《褒められたい》)	Shigatsu Yoshikawa	Rakuda	Kei Oikawa	August 17, 2022
7	"Momiji Ito Will Not Go Back"; Transliteration: "Itō Momiji wa 'Modoranai'" (Japanese: 伊藤紅葉は《戻らない》)	Seiki Takuno	Tatsuto Higuchi	Kei Oikawa	August 31, 2022
8	"Yukine Gionji Will Not Allow It"; Transliteration: "Gionji Yukine wa 'Yurusenai'" (Japanese: 祇園寺雪音は《許せない》)	Masahiro Takada	Tatsuto Higuchi	Kei Oikawa	September 7, 2022
9	"Haru Nabatame Does Not Trust"; Transliteration: "Nabatame Haru wa 'Shinjinai'" (Japanese: 青天国春は《信じない》)	Shū Honma	Tatsuto Higuchi	Kei Oikawa	September 14, 2022
10	"Ren Kurogane Wants to Go Back"; Transliteration: "Kurogane Ren wa 'Modoritai'" (Japanese: 黒金蓮は《戻りたい》)	Shigatsu Yoshikawa	Tatsuto Higuchi	Kei Oikawa; Yukiyoshi Shikiji	October 5, 2022
11	"Kyoka Tamaki is Not Discouraged"; Transliteration: "Tamaki Kyōka wa 'Kujikenai'" (Japanese: 玉城杏夏は《挫けない》)	Taisuke Tsukuda	Tatsuto Higuchi	Kei Oikawa	October 12, 2022
12	"TINGS Does Not Shine"; Transliteration: "Tingusu wa 'Kagayakanai'" (Japanese: TINGSは《輝かない》)	Takumi Narita	Tatsuto Higuchi	Kei Oikawa	October 19, 2022 (Note: This episode aired at 1:49 a.m. JST, 20 minutes after the original air time.)

=== Live concerts ===
- TINGS LIVE JOURNEY
  - ep.00 ～Prelude～ Mini Live Event "Wanna be your SHINEPOST!!!!!"（November 21, 2021)
  - ep.01 ～Departure～ Mini Live Event "Black or White? SPRING BOUT" (May 14, 2022)
  - ep.02 "Re-Live" with HY:RAIN & HOTARU (March 11, 2023)
- Road to DiAMOND
  - Road to Diamond ~Nice to meet you, I'm Laugh Diamond~ (Prov.)
  - LAUGH DiAMOND × Yukimoji 2-Man Live (April 29, 2025)
- Shine Post: TINGS Virtual LIVE 2025 "Another Re-LIVE" (October 29, 2025)
- Shine Post: Be Your Live! ep.01 @Yokohama Bay Hall (January 17, 2026)
- Shine Post: Bright Stars Festival 2026 (September 12–13, 2026)
- Idoly Pride × Shine Post CrossLive: We're HEROINES!! (September 18, 2026)
- Shine Post × Project Sekai Presents: More More Jump!+TINGS Re:Union Live! (October 17–18, 2026)

=== Game ===
A console game by Akihiro Ishihara and Konami Digital Entertainment titled Shine Post: Be Your Idol! (シャインポスト Be Your アイドル!) was announced, originally announced as a mobile game now switched into a handheld console version. On January 7, 2025, that it would be released on a consumer platform, the change in platform also changed the objective of the game. It was released for Nintendo Switch 2 in Japan on June 5, 2025.

The singing parts were created using AI singing synthesis technology from TechnoSpeech, the same company that developed CeVIO and Voisona, and the singing style changed depending on the character's mental state and training status. As this was a time when issues with AI-synthesized voices were becoming apparent, the rights of the performers were also taken into consideration.

In April 2026, the franchise has a crossover campaign with CyberAgent's Idoly Pride, titled "Polaris Idolize! IP×SP Crossover Event", and a collaboration with Tower Records Shinjuku held in June 2026. In August 2026, another collaboration with Sega's Hatsune Miku: Colorful Stage!, following the release of two Himawari Symphony songs.

== See also ==
- Oresuki—Another light novel series by the same author and illustrator.
