= Kasumi Yoshizawa =

Persona 5 Royal character

- Persona character
- Yoshizawa from Persona 5
- First appearance: Persona 5 Royal (2019)
- Designed by: Shigenori Soejima
- Voiced by: EN: Laura Post; JA: Sora Amamiya

In-universe information
- Alias: Violet
- Nationality: Japanese

Kasumi Yoshizawa (Japanese: 芳澤 かすみ, Hepburn: Yoshizawa Kasumi), later revealed to be named Sumire Yoshizawa (芳澤 すみれ, Yoshizawa Sumire) is a character in the 2019 re-release of Persona 5, Persona 5 Royal. She is a rhythmic gymnast, like her sister, as well as a transfer student to Shujin Academy, like the protagonist, Joker. She serves as a non-playable character for a large portion of the game, being revealed near the end of the game as being called Sumire, who assumed the identity of her dead sister, Kasumi. Kasumi also appeared in the manga adaptation of Persona 5 and the game Persona 5 Tactica as downloadable content.

Yoshizawa was designed by Shigenori Soejima, who used a photo of a ponytail to help inspire other aspects of her design. She is voiced by Laura Post in English and Sora Amamiya in Japanese.

== Development ==
Yoshizawa, like most characters in Persona 5, was designed by Shigenori Soejima. Throughout the game, Yoshizawa has a total of three Personas: Cendrillon, Vanadis, and Ella. In an interview with GameSpot, Soejima stated that every character he designs has a "jumping-off point," with hers being a picture of how to create a ponytail. He found this image, showing a ponytail from behind, cute, and influenced how he would design her face as well.

The website for Persona 5 describes Yoshizawa as a "beautiful girl who enrolled at Shujin Academy in the spring of the same year as the protagonist transferred in." It also states she "achieved excellent results as a rhythmic gymnast since middle school."

== Appearances ==
Sumire Yoshizawa, introduced to Ren Amamiya (Joker) as Kasumi, represents the Faith arcana. At first, unlike all other Confidants in the game, Yoshizawa initially has only five ranks. The focus of Yoshizawa's Confidant is originally her and gymnastics. During the game, on October 3, after finishing third-place in a competition, Yoshizawa becomes at risk of losing her honor student status. After this, Yoshizawa, accompanied by Joker and Morgana, accidentally enter someone's Palace in the Metaverse, the place where Joker and the Phantom Thieves are able to "change the hearts" of people. There, she awakens her Persona Cendrillon after confronting a cognitive version of her sister who chastises for her lack of knowing pity. When Joker and Morgana realize the potential of her power, they invite her to join the Phantom Thieves, which she initially declines but offers to help if they really need her. When Joker - on the run from the police - escapes Sae Niijima's Palace, which happens to be traced back to the prologue of the game, Yoshizawa rescues him from a group of Shadows to return the favor of having to rely on him so much. During the events of the Shido arc, Yoshizawa offers to join the Phantom Thieves, but is rejected over fear of being too vulnerable to Shido.

Near the beginning of the third semester of Persona 5 Royal, she enters the Metaverse along with Joker and Goro Akechi, the latter thought dead after the events at Shido's Palace, at the same mysterious Palace she and Joker infiltrated. The Palace is revealed to have been formed by Dr. Takuto Maruki, Shujin Academy's therapist who used the cognitive world to reshape the world in his own image. Maruki reveals that Kasumi is not the real name of Yoshizawa, but rather the name of her deceased sister; she is actually Sumire, the younger sister. Kasumi was killed by a car after she attempted to save an unknowing Sumire. Due to the extreme guilt and trauma Sumire received from the incident, she received therapy from Maruki. Maruki reveals that he had used cognitive intervention and psychology on Sumire to make her believe she is Kasumi. After getting into a fight with Joker and having her Persona go berserk, she eventually she comes to accept that she is Sumire, and that Kasumi is dead. She officially joins the Phantom Thieves under the codename "Violet" (the English word for "Sumire") and reawakens Cendrillon. If the player had her Confidant ranked at 5 before December 22 and defeated Yaldabaoth, her Confidant can then be extended from 6 to 10 during the third semester. Her Persona Cendrillon will evolve to Vanadis after rank 10 and Ella if the player chooses to speak to her for her third Persona awakening. She is one of the only Phantom Thief members to have a canonical crush on Joker, a feeling she retains whether Joker reciprocates it or not.

Yoshizawa, as well as Akechi, appear in Persona 5 Tactica as downloadable content. She also appears in the manga adaptation of Persona 5.

=== In other media ===
Yoshizawa appears as a free skin in the free-to-play horror game Identity V. She also appears as one of the guest characters from Persona 5 Royal in Season 6 of Call of Duty: Mobile, titled "Take Your Heart".

== Reception ==
Much of the reception around Yoshizawa and her story has been positive. She was ranked 3rd on the official character poll for Persona 5 Royal. Polygon's Laura Dale stated that Persona 5 Royal's additions, including Yoshizawa, made her want to "replay a game that is likely to take [a player] over 100 hours to complete." In IGN's review of Persona 5 Royal, Leana Hafer stated that the new characters in the game, including Yoshizawa, are "rewarding," although later saying that it was disappointing that the character doesn't join the Phantom Thieves until the third semester. Siliconera's Jenni Lada, in a review of Persona 5 Royal, said that Yoshizawa "ends up being someone we might find ourselves identifying with." Tristan Jurkovich of TheGamer called her one of the best things about Persona 5 Royal, having felt "right at home" and "shoed in". Game Informer writer Joe Juba considered her among the best characters of 2020, discussing how her outward appearance and inward struggles reflected how someone being "cheerful and optimistic" doesn't mean there isn't something more complicated going on. Polygon writer Laura Dale felt that, while Kasumi was well written, she felt "forced" in how she was presented in the early part of the story, having little to do with the conflict. However, Game Rant writer Olive Haugh felt disappointed that Yoshizawa was not involved in the fight against Shido; believing that the reasoning for dismissing her - that it was too dangerous - was not strong, as she believed she was capable enough. She felt that the player's knowledge that she would join the Phantom Thieves eventually makes this decision feel like a poorly conceived reason to have her join the Phantom Thieves later. She also argued that Shido's Palace was the only Palace that doesn't introduce a new character, and her joining then would fit the formula used in all other Palaces.
