= Larissa Tago Takeda =

Japanese voice actress

- 武田 羅梨沙 多胡
- Born: September 30; Okazaki, Aichi, Japan
- Occupation: Voice actress
- Years active: 2010–present
- Agent: I'm Enterprise

Larissa Tago Takeda (武田 羅梨沙 多胡, Takeda Rarisa Tago; born September 30) is a Japanese voice actress from Aichi Prefecture, Japan. She is affiliated with I'm Enterprise.

== Early life ==
Takeda's parents are third-generation Japanese-Brazilians. Her maternal surname is Takeda, her paternal surname is Tago, her personal name is Larissa, and Brazilian names take both parents' surnames with the maternal surname followed by the paternal one, however her name is Larissa Tago Takeda with her paternal last name serving as her middle name because Takeda sounds more Japanese.

== Filmography ==
=== Anime ===
2017

- Aikatsu Stars! as Girl, Stella (eps 65-66)
- Kino's Journey - the Beautiful World- as Child B (ep 11)
- Love Live! Sunshine!! as Female student
- My Girlfriend Is Shobitch as Shizuku Ariyama
- The Idolmaster Cinderella Girls Theater 2nd Season as Yuzu Kitami (ep 6)

2018

- Basilisk: The Ōka Ninja Scrolls as Child, boy
- Butlers: Chitose Momotose Monogatari as Woman
- Chio's School Road as Miyama's Girlfriend
- Golden Kamuy as Children (ep 3)
- Gundam Build Divers as Suu
- Hanebado! as Suzu Shiraishi (eps 4-5)
- Happy Sugar Life as Part-Timer Girl (ep 1), Sumire Miyazaki (eps 2, 4-5)
- Persona 5 the Animation as Female visitor B (ep 6)
- The Disastrous Life of Saiki K. as Female student A

2019

- Bermuda Triangle: Colorful Pastrale as Sonata

2020

- Magia Record as classmate
- Yashahime: Princess Half-Demon as Hisui (baby)
- Akudama Drive as Audience
- Talentless Nana as Student

2022

- Shadowverse Flame as Ren Kazamatsuri

2024

- Narenare: Cheer for You! as Anna Aveiro

=== OVA ===
- My Girlfriend is Shobitch as Shizuku Ariyama

=== ONA ===
2017

- The Idolmaster Cinderella Girls Theater (Web) 2nd Season as Yuzu Kitami (ep 9)
- Yakiniku-ten Sengoku as Aoi Shachigashira

=== Anime Film ===
2018

- Penguin Highway as Ono-san

=== Video games ===
2017

- Formation Girls as Ririko Tomohata
- Hoshi no Liberion as Cadmos
- Shirohime Quest Kyoku as Nagahama Castle, Murakami Castle
- The Idolmaster Cinderella Girls as Yuzu Kitami
- The Idolmaster Cinderella Girls: Starlight Stage as Yuzu Kitami
- Tsuyokute NEW GAME as Tomoe, Nia

2018

- Anata no Shikihime Kyoudoutan as Monomaria
- Abyss Horizon as Kodaka, Charger, Arkansas
- 23/7 Twenty Three Seven as Sigurd Riva
- Katana Maidens ~ Toji No Miko: Kizamishi Issen no Tomoshibi as Sawano Fukuda
- Cuisine Dimension as Omurice

2020

- Azur Lane as Marblehead
- Last Period as Lao

=== Drama CD ===
- Uchi no Ko no Tame Naraba, Ore wa Moshikashitara Maou mo Taoseru Kamoshirenai as Chloe Schneider
