= Persona 5 Tactica =

2023 video game

- Developer: P-Studio
- Publisher: Sega: JP: Atlus
- Director: Naoya Maeda
- Producers: Atsushi Nomura; Kazuhisa Wada
- Designer: Kaoru Kigawa
- Programmer: Daisuke Yajima
- Artist: Hanako Oribe
- Writer: Akihiro Togawa
- Composer: Toshiki Konishi
- Series: Persona
- Engine: Unity
- Platforms: Nintendo Switch; PlayStation 4; PlayStation 5; Windows; Xbox One; Xbox Series X/S
- Release: November 17, 2023
- Genre: Tactical role-playing
- Mode: Single-player

Persona 5 Tactica (Note: Japanese: ペルソナ5 タクティカ, Hepburn: Perusona Faibu Takutika) is a 2023 tactical role-playing game developed and published by Atlus. The game is a title from the Persona series, itself a part of the larger Megami Tensei franchise. Persona 5 Tactica takes place concurrently with the events of Persona 5 (2016), depicting the Phantom Thieves of Hearts as they are transported to an alternate world overcome with war and oppression, prompting an alliance with a group of freedom fighters known as the Rebel Corps to stage a revolution against the enemies known as the Legionnaires while uncovering the truth of its mysterious origins. Gameplay encompasses standard conventions of strategy RPGs, including grid-based navigation, a weapon affinity system, and turn-based combat, while employing several staple gameplay mechanics from the series such as Persona summoning and fusion, and elemental affinities.

Persona 5 Tactica entered development due to a desire at Atlus to create a game in the strategy role-playing genre within the Persona series, leveraging the publisher's past experiences with similarly styled games, in addition to the correlation between the genre and the established world of Persona 5.

Persona 5 Tactica was released for Nintendo Switch, PlayStation 4, PlayStation 5, Windows, Xbox One, and Xbox Series X/S on November 17, 2023. An additional story chapter, "Repaint Your Heart", was released as downloadable content on the same day.

== Gameplay ==
Characters ready to perform a Triple Threat attack

Persona 5 Tactica is a tactical role-playing video game in which the player controls a party of up to three characters on a grid-based map populated by enemy units, who are directly confronted through the initiation of turn-based encounters. The ally units a player may take into battle comprise the central members of the Phantom Thieves of Hearts, as well the Rebel Corps' leader Erina. Characters can take cover during battle to reduce the amount of damage they take, or block it altogether. At any point while navigating the grid, characters can take actions, or end their turn early to gain a beneficial effect in the next turn. Characters can do close-quarters physical attacks to push enemies around the grid. Characters' gun attacks can hit enemies from afar, and some characters can hit multiple enemies in one shot. The Phantom Thieves can summon their Personas during encounters, enabling them to use a variety of Skills at the cost of Skill Points (SP). Similarly to the battle system in Persona 5, Skills have different elemental affinities, but in Tactica different elements can force enemies to move around the area in different ways. When a character attacks an enemy that is not located in cover, the enemy is knocked down and the character is granted "1 More" turn to select a command. When at least one enemy unit has been knocked down, while being surrounded by ally units in a triangular formation on the grid, the player is prompted to initiate a special "Triple Threat" attack that deals significant damage to all enemies within the triangle.

The player is able to collect additional Personas and equip them to any of the characters as Sub-Personas to grant additional skills. These Personas may be obtained as rewards from battle, or fusing multiple Personas together.

== Plot ==
=== Main story ===
Sometime during the events of Persona 5 (2016) after the Phantom Thieves of Hearts defeated Yaldabaoth and lost their Metaverse powers, the party meetup at Cafe LeBlanc during preparation for their graduation from Shujin Academy. On TV, a news report announced that renowned politician and National Diet member Toshiro Kasukabe has gone missing, with clues to his whereabouts remaining unsolved.

Suddenly, the party is transported into an alternate, Medieval European-like world called a Kingdom ruled by Tyrant Marie, who easily overwhelms almost all of the Phantom Thieves by brainwashing them in order to serve her. As Joker and Morgana are about to surrender, they're rescued by and allied with Erina, the leader of a group of freedom fighters known as the Rebel Corps, who vows to help her stage a revolution and free this world from its authoritarian rule under the tyrannical ruler known as the Legionnaires. Raiding Marie's castle, they rescue a captive Toshiro, who is suffering from amnesia, and proceed to rescue the rest of the thieves from Marie's clutches. Through fights with Marie’s forces, Toshiro’s past is revealed as the thieves learn that Tyrant Marie is Marie Anto, Toshiro’s domineering fiancé, who treats Toshiro as a puppet to advance in society. Toshiro works up the courage to defy Marie, resulting in her defeat.

The thieves attempt to go home but instead arrive in an Edo period-like Kingdom ruled by Lord Yoshiki, a ruler who operates under the pretense of being a calm leader. The group is helped by a woman named Yuki, and as the fights with Yoshiki's forces progress, it is revealed Lord Yoshiki is Toshiro's stern father Yoshiki Kasukabe, a corrupt politician himself who raised Toshiro strictly to the point of abuse. This revelation, along with Marie's connection to Toshiro, causes the party to realize that the world they have been transported to is based on Toshiro's cognition. In a final confrontation with Yoshiki, Yuki is revealed to be Toshiro's deceased mother, who then sacrifices herself to save Toshiro and defeat Yoshiki.

The thieves then move on to the third Kingdom, modeled after Toshiro’s former high school. As the thieves traverse the school in search of the keys to a potential door home, Toshiro’s past with his former classmate Eri Natsuhara, a fellow student council member, is revealed: After reports of abuse and blackmail by vice-principal Ichiro Nakabachi, the two rallied his victims to expose his crimes. However, the student rebellion resulted in Nakabachi becoming the target of a lynch mob of students, some of whom never suffered at his hands. This caused a crazed Nakabachi to stalk Eri and Toshiro to a train station and push Eri onto the tracks. Eri survives, albeit badly injured and losing her will to fight. The similarity between Eri and Erina is pointed out by the party. Assuming the kingdom's ruler is Nakabachi, the thieves soon learn the mysterious ruler is someone else entirely, who in turn kidnaps Erina.

In an attempt to save her, it is revealed to the party that the Kingdom's true ruler is Shadow Toshiro, who is consumed by guilt and resentment towards Eri for causing Toshiro such trauma and dismay, and now aims to get rid of Erina, who cognitively based on Eri. Having fallen to despair due to the machinations of the ruler, Toshiro remembers that an injured Eri told him that the victims had thanked them for leading the rebellion and exposing the truth, and Eri never regretted her actions despite the results, instead encouraging Toshiro to continue fighting until she could catch up to him. With Toshiro’s newfound resolve, Erina finally gains her newfound freedom and transforms herself into his Persona, Ernesto, as part of his awakening, to defeat Shadow Toshiro.

However, Shadow Toshiro's demise attracts the attention of the mastermind, the god-like tyrant Salmael, having aimed to repress Toshiro's inner rebellion in order to forcefully bring about an era of peace. Salmael offers the thieves a way home in exchange for their memories and Personas, however, the thieves reject the offer and defeat him. Now able to go back home, the thieves are forced to emotionally part ways with Erina, since as a part of Toshiro's own heart, she is unable to leave his cognitive world and bid them farewell.

Back in the real world, the party learns that Toshiro has withdrawn from his political campaign and exposed the crimes of his father and fiancé in a press conference. They then receive a phone call from Toshiro, who expresses respect and gratitude for all they have done for him, thanks them for their alliance, and wishes them to meet again someday. With the rebellion finally done, Toshiro vows to start his political journey anew with an emphasis on bettering society.

A post-credits scene depicts Toshiro going to the hospital, where he emotionally reunites with a recovered Eri, now using a cane, who says she has finally caught up to him.

=== "Repaint Your Heart" ===
Street artist Guernica has painted protest art on government buildings overnight. When a mural depicting Joker's Persona is painted in his neighborhood, he, Goro Akechi, and Kasumi Yoshizawa investigate and are transported to an urban alternate dimension known as The Streets. In The Streets, a masked woman and her parrot gleefully commit a massacre. Luca, a young girl, rescues Joker, Akechi, and Kasumi. Luca explains that the woman was Guernica, an activist who became violent in The Streets, a world within her heart when her first statement piece was broken. Luca says that Guernica brought the trio to The Streets to get help in her last calm moment.

While the trio is recovering the parts of Guernica's statement piece, they are interrupted by her parrot, Jerri, who insists that the violence was Guernica's wish. Guernica appears and fights the trio, not recognizing them or Luca. Guernica witnesses a part of the piece, is weakened, and recognizes Luca as her older sister. The real Luca died years ago, and the young Luca that Guernica remembered was guiding Joker, Akechi, and Kasumi. As children, Guernica and Luca made the statement piece together.

Guernica retreats and begins to contemplate what she's done, but Jerri further manipulates her in her weakened state into turning her rage at the status quo against ordinary people. Jerri plans to unleash Guernica in the real world. Joker, Akechi, Kasumi, and Luca recover the last part of Guernica's statement piece. Luca reminds Guernica of their original ideals to stand up for people and disappear. Guernica is restored to her true self and defeats Jerri. The trio return to the real world and lose their memories, Guernica continues creating protest art in the real world, and Jerri speaks to her superior before disappearing.

== Development ==
Persona 5 Tactica was announced at the Xbox Games Showcase in June 2023. To coincide with the game's reveal, Weekly Famitsu published a series of interviews with several staff involved with the game. The first, conducted with the game's director Naoya Maeda, producer Kazuhisa Wada and business producer Atsushi Nomura, revealed details on the motivation behind making a Persona-themed strategy game, with Wada remarking on Tactica's potential for "expanding the possibilities of the series", in addition to his personal desire to tell a new story with the Persona 5 characters. Maeda further spoke to the game's accessibility to casual players who were not as familiar or skilled at playing strategy role-playing games, highlighting the ease of seeing ally and enemy advantages and weaknesses through their positions on the battle grids. Persona 5 vocalist Lyn (Note: Lyn's full name is Lyn Inaizumi.) contributed new themes to the game's score, composed by Atlus Sound Team member Toshiki Konishi. Konishi used similar lyrics and riffs across the game's soundtrack to make the songs "feel connected" to each other. The game's battle music was made to not be overly rousing so that players would not be distracted.

Wada stated the desire to produce Tactica came from a lack of a tactics-based game in the Persona series despite Atlus' prior experience producing games in that genre, including Devil Survivor (2009) and Devil Survivor 2 (2011). Nomura shared this sentiment, feeling that the characteristic traits and gameplay elements associated with the Phantom Thieves of Hearts, such as stealth and observing enemy behavior from vantage points, fit with the genre, providing an example of a map with height differences between enemy and ally units. He explained, "By moving the character directly, you can find locations where it is difficult for you to be attacked or it is easy to coordinate with others. So you will be developing strategies before you know it." Earlier in development prior to the character redesigns being finalized, the team used the models of the Phantom Thieves members from Persona Q2: New Cinema Labyrinth (2019) when prototyping the game before deciding on the art direction. However, despite the similarities in art style to the Persona Q games, character designer Hanako Oribe felt that the decision to retain the characters' original proportions in other appearances while placing more emphasis on exaggerating their hands and feet, resulted in a look more reminiscent of comic books. Director Naoya Maeda stated that the game's camera angle meant that standard character proportions would "almost look like stick figures", hence the character redesigns.

== Release ==
Persona 5 Tactica was released for Nintendo Switch, PlayStation 4, PlayStation 5, Windows, Xbox One, and Xbox Series X/S on November 17, 2023. The game also launched on Xbox Game Pass. In addition to the standard edition, a Digital Deluxe Edition is available, bundling the base game with in-game extras and immediate access to the game's day-one downloadable content (DLC) chapter, "Repaint Your Heart". On November 8, 2023, the game was accidentally released on the Steam marketplace before being fixed around 20 minutes later, with the game being fully playable for those who downloaded it during this time frame.

=== Downloadable content ===
The game was released alongside additional DLC. First print copies of Persona 5 Tactica were pre-loaded with two extra Personas for Joker to use in battle, Izanagi Picaro and Orpheus Picaro. An additional story scenario titled "Repaint Your Heart" was made available from day one, both as a standalone purchase, and included with the game's Digital Deluxe Edition. This chapter introduces a new narrative featuring returning characters Goro Akechi and Kasumi Yoshizawa from Persona 5 and Persona 5 Royal, as well as remixed battle elements.

== Reception ==
Reception

Aggregate scores
Aggregator	Score
Metacritic	PC: 77/100; XSXS: 77/100; PS5: 75/100; NS: 79/100
OpenCritic	67% recommend

Review scores
Publication	Score
Eurogamer	3/5
Famitsu	33/40
GameSpot	8/10
GamesRadar+	4/5
IGN	8/10
Nintendo Life	9/10
RPGFan	75/100
Hardcore Gamer	3.5/5

Persona 5 Tactica received "generally favorable" reviews from critics, according to review aggregator website Metacritic.

Reviewers generally praised the game's themes of rebelling against oppression, but Polygon and RPGFan considered the execution to be "taking a safe route" and "ring[ing] hollow" respectively.

From November 13-19 of 2023, the game sold at least an estimated 49,928 physical units in Japan.
