= Marvel Rivals =

2024 video game

- Developer: NetEase Games
- Publisher: NetEase Games
- Director: Guangyun Chen (Note: Marvel Rivals director Guangyun Chen is also known by his nickname Guangguang.)
- Producer: Weicong Wu
- Designers: Aden; Zhiyong
- Programmer: Fan Feng
- Artist: Dino Ma
- Writer: Jinghua Duan
- Engine: Unreal Engine 5
- Platforms: PlayStation 5 Windows; Xbox Series X/S; PlayStation 4 Nintendo Switch 2
- Release: PlayStation 5, Windows, Xbox Series X/S; December 6, 2024; PlayStation 4 September 12, 2025; Nintendo Switch 2 TBA
- Genres: Third-person shooter; Hero shooter
- Mode: Multiplayer

Marvel Rivals (Note: Simplified Chinese: 漫威争锋; traditional Chinese: 漫威爭鋒; pinyin: Mànwēi Zhēngfēng.) is a free-to-play hero shooter video game developed and published by NetEase Games in collaboration with Marvel Games. The game was released for PlayStation 5, Windows, and Xbox Series X/S on December 6, 2024, with a PlayStation 4 version released on September 12, 2025 and a Nintendo Switch 2 version currently in development. The game is free-to-play with a current lineup of 55 playable characters from Marvel Comics, and features cross-play across all supported platforms. As of November 2026, eleven seasons of playable storylines have been released to the game, based on the comic book series and events "Blood Hunt", "Hellfire Gala", "King in Black", The Immortal Iron Fist, Mr. & Mrs. X, Deadpool, and "Devil's Reign".

Marvel Comics has released two digital ongoing series based on the game: Marvel Rivals Infinity Comic (2024) and Marvel Rivals: Unleashed Infinity Comic (2025). Characters from the game have also been featured in other Marvel comic series.

== Premise ==
The story follows a hostile meeting between Doctor Doom and his heroic 2099 counterpart, which causes a "timestream entanglement" that leads to new worlds being created and heroes and villains from across the multiverse fighting one another to defeat both Doom variants before one claims victory over the new worlds.

== Gameplay ==
Marvel Rivals is a 6v6 third-person hero shooter title. The game features destructible environments, allowing players to alter the battlefield (which is overseen by Galacta). As of July 2026, there are 23 unique maps active in the game.

=== Modes ===
The game has eight modes:

- Convoy – Two teams are randomly assigned offense or defense. Offense teams escort a moving object through the map while defence teams must stop the object by capturing it. The object will passively move forward while captured by offence and backwards while captured by defence; only offence may increase the object's speed, by standing near it. Regardless of the team that has captured it, the object will remain stationary if a member of the opposing team is nearby. In competitive mode, team roles will swap once offence has escorted the object to its destination or the timer runs out; if both teams successfully escort the object to its destination as offence, tiebreaker rounds will occur using the leftover offence time of each team. Maps currently include Yggsgard: Yggdrasil Path, Tokyo 2099: Spider-Islands, Empire of Eternal Night: Midtown, Hellfire Gala: Arakko, Museum of Contemplation, and Thebes.
- Domination – Two teams attack a zone within an area map; one from a pool of three for each map. When the zone is captured, the defending team will gradually gain points until 100% is reached. This is then repeated on another area map until a team has captured two zones, achieving victory. Maps currently include, Yggsgard: Royal Palace, Hydra Charteris Base: Hell's Heaven, Intergalactic Empire of Wakanda: Birnin T'Challa, Hellfire Gala: Krakoa, Klyntar: Celestial Husk, and The God Quarry.
- Convergence – Two teams are randomly assigned as either attacking or defending. Attacking teams must secure a starting checkpoint while defending teams must prevent the checkpoint from capture until the timer ends. If the attacking team successfully captures the checkpoint, the game shifts into mechanics identical to Convoy. Maps currently include, Tokyo 2099: Shin-Shibuya, Intergalactic Empire of Wakanda: Hall of Djalia, Klyntar: Symbiotic Surface, Empire of Eternal Night: Central Park, K'un-Lun: Heart of Heaven, and Lower Manhattan.
- Resource Rumble – Two teams battle over one of three zones on a singular map to collect resources. Once the zone is depleted of resources, another zone will unlock. If a team collects all resources from two zones, they win. If both teams collect enough resources from the first two zones, the third zone will unlock and teams must fight to capture it and steal the other team's resources to win. This mode is currently only available in custom match. Maps currently include, Klyntar: Throne of Knull.
- Conquest – Two teams battle to eliminate opposition. Eliminated heroes drop points that can be picked up by opponents, adding to their team's count, or allies, denying the opposition of the point. The game ends when a team reaches 50 points or the timer runs out, with the team holding the most points winning. Maps currently include, Tokyo 2099: Ninomaru.
- Doom Match – A free-for-all deathmatch between up to 12 players. The game ends when a player reaches 16 Final Hits, and the top half of players are declared the match's winners. Maps currently include, Empire of Eternal Night: Sanctum Sanctorum and Alchemax Headquarters.
- 18 vs. 18 Annihilation - Two teams without hero duplicate restrictions fight in a 36-player deathmatch. Teams are rewarded points for each kill with a target score of 120 under a 6-minute time limit. If the timer expires, the side with the higher score wins. This mode can be played either player vs. player, or player vs. AI. Maps currently include, Grand Garden.
- 18 vs. 18 Bounty Annihilation - Two teams without hero duplicate restrictions fight in a 36-player battle over control zones. One of three zones on the map is active at a time, then the objective zone will change once 100 total points have been accrued. Players capturing a zone begins generating points, and scoring kills grants 1 point. After dying, players can choose where they respawn from one of three points. The first team to earn 300 points wins. Maps currently include, K'un-Lun: Shenloong Arena.

Quick Match and Practice Vs. AI feature non-ranked games where three modes are available; Domination, Convoy, and Convergence. In Practice Vs. AI, AI opponents are used instead of real players.

Competitive also features the aforementioned modes but is unlocked when an account reaches Level 15. Here, players occupy one of nine ranks, which each containing three tiers; at the beginning of each season, players carry out "placement matches", which, alongside a projected rank based on past performance, are used to assign the player an initial rank for the respective season. During games, players are matched with others based on rank, with promotion and demotion between ranks occurring based on wins and losses. During games at Gold rank and higher, players are able to elect six heroes to be banned from use (each team chooses three heroes). Depending on their final rank, players are rewarded with cosmetic items at the end of each season.

Players can also partake in Tournament matches after both earning at least Platinum rank and joining a Faction. Tournament matches feature the same modes and rulesets as Competitive, typically in best of three or best of five formats using multiple matches of different game modes. There are five hero bans per team that apply solely to the opposing team, and there are two protect slots that prevent heroes from being banned.

The arcade hub features more casual modes: Doom Match, Conquest, and Free Fight. Free Fight uses Quick Match rulesets but allows duplicate heroes, using Competitive's hero ban system to compensate. There have also been several limited-time game modes, such as Jeff's Winter Splash Festival, Clash of Dancing Lions, Giant-Sized Hive Mind and Ultron's Battle Matrix Protocol.

Several limited time game modes incorporate PvE gameplay. Marvel Zombies (inspired by the animated series Marvel Zombies) was the game's first PvE mode. The second PvE mode, Blood Hunt (inspired by the comic book crossover Blood Hunt) was added to the game on April 23rd, 2026. Avengers: Age of Ultron was the third PvE mode that was added to the game in August 2026, a wave-based PvE mode where players have the option to choose from seven Avengers heroes.

=== Playable characters ===
As of November 2026, 55 playable characters have been added to the game.

Guangyun Chen, the game's creative director, has expressed the aim to include both fan favourites and lesser known characters in the roster, saying, "When it comes to designing characters in our game, we usually dive really deep into the background and personality of each Marvel character, so every character's gameplay mechanic and skill is really crafted to reflect who these heroes really are in the comics."

Playable characters are divided into three main roles: Vanguard, Duelist, and Strategist. Vanguard heroes function like tanks. Duelist heroes are designed to deal maximum damage and secure kills. Strategist heroes support their teammates through healing, buffs and other utility abilities. Each character's skillset is based on their comic book counterparts and typically features active and passive abilities, as well as a basic primary attack. Furthermore, each character possesses a unique ultimate ability that can only be used after the build-up of an ultimate charge meter, either passively over time or by engaging in combat.

Unique to Rivals is the idea of Team-ups, where a hero gains an additional ability from another hero. Initially at launch, there were a limited number of Team-ups, and required the allied team to have both heroes selected to take advantage of this. With the launch of Season 9 in July 2026, each hero gained at least two different Team-up abilities regardless of what other heroes their allies were playing, selecting this Team-Up from the character select screen. Having the associated hero of a Team-up on the allied team grants an enhanced effect to the ability. For example, The Hulk can choose either a Captain America Team-up that grants a ground slam ability and a cooldown reduction passive or a Wolverine Team-up that grants a fury state ability and the Unstoppable status effect at low health. If Captain America is on his team, then his ground slam Team-up deals more damage and applies the Vulnerability status to enemies hit. Whereas Wolverine on his team grants Hulk the ability throw Wolverine towards foes in a "Fastball Special" when Hulk's fury state Team-up equipped.

The game does not require players into a "role queue", which would otherwise mandate a specific blend of heroes on a team; Chen said this was "to offer a wider variety of team composition", as well as to allow players to use team-up abilities without restrictions.

The list of playable characters in the game currently includes:

Vanguards
Hero	Released
Angela; Aldrif Odinsdottir	Season 4 (September 11, 2025)
Bruce Banner / Hulk	Launch (December 6, 2024)
Captain America; Steve Rogers	Launch (December 6, 2024)
Deadpool; Wade Wilson (Note: Deadpool can be played as a Duelist, Vanguard, or Strategist, with his stats and abilities varying depending on the role. Deadpool still counts as single hero, sharing hero proficiency and hero duplicate restrictions between roles.)	Season 6 (January 16, 2026)
Devil Dinosaur	Season 8 (May 15, 2026)
Doctor Strange; Stephen Strange	Launch (December 6, 2024)
Emma Frost	Season 2 (April 11, 2025)
Groot	Launch (December 6, 2024)
Magneto; Max Eisenhardt	Launch (December 6, 2024)
Peni Parker	Launch (December 6, 2024)
Rogue; Anna Marie	Season 5.5 (December 12, 2025)
The Hood; Parker Robbins	Season 9.5 (August 7, 2026)
The Thing; Ben Grimm	Season 1.5 (February 21, 2025)
Thor	Launch (December 6, 2024)
Venom; Eddie Brock	Launch (December 6, 2024)

Duelists
Hero	Released
Black Cat; Felicia Hardy	Season 7.5 (April 17, 2026)
Black Panther; T'Challa	Launch (December 6, 2024)
Black Widow; Natasha Romanova	Launch (December 6, 2024)
Blade; Eric Brooks	Season 3.5 (August 8, 2025)
Cyclops; Scott Summers	Season 8.5 (June 12, 2026)
Daredevil; Matt Murdock	Season 4.5 (October 10, 2025)
Deadpool; Wade Wilson	Season 6 (January 16, 2026)
Elsa Bloodstone	Season 6.5 (February 13, 2026)
Gorr the God Butcher	Season 10 (September 11, 2026)
Hawkeye; Clint Barton	Launch (December 6, 2024)
Hela	Launch (December 6, 2024)
Human Torch; Johnny Storm	Season 1.5 (February 21, 2025)
Iron Fist; Lin Lie	Launch (December 6, 2024)
Iron Man; Tony Stark	Launch (December 6, 2024)
Magik; Illyana Rasputin	Launch (December 6, 2024)
Mister Fantastic; Reed Richards	Season 1 (January 10, 2025)
Moon Knight; Marc Spector	Launch (December 6, 2024)
Namor	Launch (December 6, 2024)
Phoenix; Jean Grey	Season 3 (July 11, 2025)
Psylocke; Sai	Launch (December 6, 2024)
Scarlet Witch; Wanda Maximoff	Launch (December 6, 2024)
Spider-Man; Peter Parker	Launch (December 6, 2024)
Squirrel Girl; Doreen Green	Launch (December 6, 2024)
Star-Lord; Peter Quill	Launch (December 6, 2024)
Storm; Ororo Munroe	Launch (December 6, 2024)
The Punisher; Frank Castle	Launch (December 6, 2024)
Winter Soldier; Bucky Barnes	Launch (December 6, 2024)
Wolverine; James "Logan" Howlett	Launch (December 6, 2024)

Strategists
Hero	Released
Adam Warlock	Launch (December 6, 2024)
Cloak & Dagger; Ty Johnson & Tandy Bowen	Launch (December 6, 2024)
Deadpool; Wade Wilson	Season 6 (January 16, 2026)
Gambit; Remy LeBeau	Season 5 (November 14, 2025)
Invisible Woman; Susan Storm	Season 1 (January 10, 2025)
Jeff the Land Shark	Launch (December 6, 2024)
Jubilee; Jubilation Lee	Season 9 (July 10, 2026)
Loki	Launch (December 6, 2024)
Luna Snow; Seol Hee	Launch (December 6, 2024)
Mantis	Launch (December 6, 2024)
Nightcrawler; Kurt Wagner	Season 11 (November 13, 2026)
Rocket Raccoon	Launch (December 6, 2024)
Ultron	Season 2.5 (May 30, 2025)
White Fox; Ami Han	Season 7 (March 20, 2026)

Dracula will release in Season 11.5.

Many characters, in addition to cosmetic skins original to the game, have unlockable or purchasable cosmetics based on alternative versions of themselves from various comic book series, Marvel Cinematic Universe appearances, or other video games such as Marvel's Spider-Man 2 and Marvel Cosmic Invasion.

=== Seasonal content ===
New content is routinely added to Marvel Rivals through seasonal updates. Initially, each season was to last three months long and split into two halves, releasing new content with each half season, including at least one new hero. From season 3 onward, seasons have lasted two months but still split into two halves, effectively introducing a new hero on a monthly basis.

Each season features a purchasable battle pass which includes cosmetic items (such as character skins, emotes, sprays and player banners) that the player can buy by using Chrono Tokens, the in-game currency earned from playing matches and completing daily, weekly, and seasonal challenges. Once the player purchases a battle pass for the season, it will no longer expire. Other cosmetic contents are available for purchase within the in-game story using Lattice, a premium currency that can be obtained through Achievement rewards, events, the Battle Pass, or with real-world currency. Furthermore, Marvel Rivals has offered short term events around holiday or seasonal themes, which may include limited-time modes and themed cosmetics for completing challenges; for example, the first Winter Celebration event (December 2024–January 2025) featured a 4v4 game mode similar to Splatoon where players used Jeff the Land Shark's spit attack to cover the most area on a map with their team's colour.

Season	Start	End	Theme
0	December 6, 2024	January 9, 2025	"Dooms' Rise" – Shortened season for the launch of the game.
1	January 10, 2025	April 10, 2025	"Eternal Night Falls" – Introduced the Fantastic Four (Mister Fantastic, the Invisible Woman, the Human Torch, and the Thing) as playable heroes. Added Sanctum Sanctorum, Midtown and Central Park maps, and included a vampiric invasion of New York City as the central story focus. Based on the Blood Hunt (2024) comics storyline.
2	April 11, 2025	July 11, 2025	"Hellfire Gala" – Introduced Emma Frost and Ultron as playable heroes. Added Krakoa and Arakko maps, and included Ultron's attack on Krakoa as the central story focus. Based on the Hellfire Gala comics event from the Krakoan Age.
3	July 11, 2025	September 12, 2025	"The Abyss Awakens" – Introduced Phoenix and Blade as playable heroes. Added Celestial Husk and Throne of Knull maps, and included Knull and Hela's takeover of the galaxy as the central story focus. Based on the "King in Black" (2021) comics storyline; Hela then later appeared in the "Queen in Black" (2026) comics storyline.
4	September 12, 2025	November 14, 2025	"The Heart of the Dragon" – Introduced Angela and Daredevil as playable heroes. Added a Heart of Heaven map, and included Shou-Lao invoking a tournament between the Immortal Weapons to prevent Doom from claiming his chi as the central story focus. Based on the "Tournament of Heaven" storyline from The Immortal Iron Fist (2006) comics series.
5	November 14, 2025	January 16, 2026	"Love is a Battlefield" – Introduced Gambit and Rogue as playable heroes. Added Times Square and Grand Garden maps, and included Gambit striking a deal with the Grandmaster and stealing a contract from the Collector as the central story focus. Based on the Mr. & Mrs. X (2018) comics series.
6	January 16, 2026	March 20, 2026	"Night at the Museum" – Introduced Deadpool and Elsa Bloodstone as playable heroes. Added a Museum of Contemplation map, and included Deadpool betraying the Collector and plunging his museum into chaos as the central story focus. Based on the "King of the Monsters" storyline from the Deadpool (2019) comic series.
7	March 20, 2026	May 15, 2026	"The Hunt is On" – Introduced White Fox and Black Cat as playable heroes. Added a Lower Manhattan map, and included Wilson Fisk's anti-superhero mayoral efforts to save New York from a multiversal Alchemax invasion as the central story focus. Based on the "Devil's Reign" (2021) comics storyline.
8	May 15, 2026	July 10, 2026	"Sins of Alchemax" – Introduced Devil Dinosaur and Cyclops as playable heroes. Added Alchemax Headquarters, Shenloong Arena and Hellfire Bay Beach maps, and included Alchemax's capture of Cyclops and Moon Girl as the central story focus.
9	July 10, 2026	September 11, 2026	"The Mystery of Thebes" – Introduced Jubilee and The Hood as playable heroes. Added a Thebes map, and included the murder mystery of Apocalypse as the central story focus.
10	September 11, 2026	November 13, 2026	"Butcher's Blasphemy" – Introduces Gorr the God Butcher as a playable hero. Adds a God Quarry map, and includes Gorr's quest to detonate the "Godbomb" and kill all gods as the central story focus.

== Development ==
Marvel Games partnered with NetEase Games to develop a team-based PvP hero shooter game. NetEase Games is mainly responsible for the design and development of gameplay content, while Marvel Games has a supervisory role ensuring the content conforms to the tone of the Marvel brand and intellectual property. NetEase Games' development team for Marvel Rivals, based in Guangzhou, is led by lead producer Weicong Wu and creative director Guangyun Chen.

The game is built on Unreal Engine 5. Marvel Games senior producer Danny Koo characterized Marvel Rivals visually as a blend of Eastern and Western art styles.

Each season is preceded by a planning process for that seasons' content. The developers first plan the theme of the season and then consider the kind of new experiences they want to bring to players for that season, which serves as the basis to evaluate what kind of heroes are more suitable. At the same time, they consider what new gameplay may appear and the corresponding new level maps.

While the development team has experimented with additional gameplay modes, there were no initial plans to introduce a player versus environment game mode, as of February 2025. They later announced the "Marvel Zombies" PvE mode.

== Release and marketing ==
Marvel Games first announced the game through a trailer released on March 27, 2024. On November 30, 2024, less than a week before the game's release, the launch trailer for the game was released, showcasing 5 new playable heroes that would be added upon launch.

=== Playtests ===
Marvel Rivals had a closed alpha test accessible to the public lasting ten days, from May 10–20, 2024. Players could earn permanent rewards transferrable to the game's final release through gameplay. Included rewards were an exclusive alpha tester title and a playable skin for the character Scarlet Witch, both earned through the test's dedicated battle pass. Additional permanent rewards were the "Dawn of Legends" title, gained from placing Top 32 in the game's eponymous alpha tournament, and an in-game spray decoration, gained by playing with/against a game developer during the playtest.

NetEase received backlash during the alpha playtest when streamer Brandon Larned called out the company on social media for including a non-disparagement clause in the contract given to content creators who had access to the alpha test, barring reviews from saying anything negative about the game. Following the controversy, NetEase apologized and stated it would be revising its contract to be more creator-friendly.

A closed beta test for Marvel Rivals took place from July 23 to August 5, 2024, for both consoles and PC.

=== Release ===
Marvel Rivals is free-to-play from its initial release. Though the game was set to release for Windows via Steam and Epic Games, NetEase Games had stated that it is exploring potential releases on other platforms. During Sony's State of Play held in May, the game was revealed to also be released for PlayStation 5 and Xbox Series X/S, as well as its upcoming beta playtest. On November 16, 2024, it was confirmed that Marvel Rivals features an option to select between English, Japanese or Mandarin voice overs at a launch date.

Marvel Rivals was released on December 6, 2024. Thaddeus Sasser, a director of NetEase Games' Seattle-based design team, stated there is a switching cost in which players who are invested in one game are less willing to move to other games; he contrasted the success of the Marvel Rivals release with the commercial failure of hero shooter Concord released the same year, attributing the latter's underperformance to it not providing unique value to overcome this consideration.

In February 2025, NetEase laid off their Seattle-based design team including director Sasser. This team reportedly comprised six people. Kotaku reported that "the size and location of the teams that worked on the hero shooter have been hard to pin down, and it's not immediately clear what the extent of the teams impacted were or why". NetEase said in a response to the closure that they "recently made the difficult decision to adjust Marvel Rivals' development team structure for organizational reasons and to optimize development efficiency for the game" with work still ongoing by their Guangzhou-based core development team.

The game was released on the PlayStation 4 on September 12, 2025, alongside the start of the fourth season; the game runs at 30 frames per second (fps) at 1080p on base consoles, with the PlayStation 4 Pro version running at 1440p and 60 fps.

In March 2026, Marvel Games executive producer Danny Koo confirmed that a Nintendo Switch 2 version of Marvel Rivals is currently in development.

=== Comics ===
Marvel Rivals Infinity Comic (2024) was initially a six-issue digital limited series by writer Paul Allor and artist Luca Claretti; it was published by Marvel Comics as part of their Infinity Comics program on Marvel Unlimited. The series then returned in 2025 as an ongoing series. A second digital ongoing series, Marvel Rivals: Unleashed Infinity Comic (2025), began in October 21, 2025; this series is also written by Allor.

Sai: Dimensional Rivals (2026) is a five-issue limited series by Peach Momoko along with other creators such as Stan Sakai, Esad Ribić, Natacha Bustos, Mike del Mundo, and Sara Pichelli. Sai was created by Momoko as the Ultimate Universe take on the X-Men character Psylocke; she debuted in the 2021 Demon Days Saga comic series before appearing as a character in Marvel Rivals. In April 2026, Justin Carter of Gizmodo wrote that Marvel Rivals "has had several tie-in comics and reverberated into the main Marvel books—this summer's 'Queen in Black' event focuses on Hela and comes after Rivals' third, symbiote-heavy season".

=== Other tie-in media ===
A new game mode inspired by Marvel Rivals was added to the tabletop Marvel Multiverse Role-Playing Game. Additionally, a Marvel Rivals themed glider for use in Fortnite Battle Royale was made available via playing challenges in Marvel Rivals and linking an Epic Games account to receive it. Furthermore, a skin based on Doctor Doom 2099 was made available for use in Fortnite, with a LEGO style for use in LEGO Fortnite experiences.

== Esports ==
Marvel Rivals has quickly established a competitive esports scene since its launch, with NetEase actively organizing and supporting various tournaments. The game's competitive structure includes both open qualifiers for all players and invitation-only events for professional teams. Balance patches have also been implemented.

=== Tournaments and other competitive events ===
- Marvel Rivals Championship (MRC): A seasonal in-game event open to all players, including both casual teams and those sponsored by esports organizations.
- Marvel Rivals Invitational (MRI): Invite-only tournaments featuring established esports organizations.
- Marvel Rivals Ignite 2025: A tournament for teams that clear both the open qualifiers and the regional playoffs. Screen Rant noted that the $3 million prize pool is "one of the largest competitive prize pools seen for the game so far".
- Rivals Fight Night: A recurring event which has North American and European brackets.
- Marvel Rivals Ignite 2026: The official professional Esports circuit for Marvel Rivals, with a prize pool over $3,000,000 USD.

== Reception ==
Reception

Aggregate scores
Aggregator	Score
Metacritic	PC: 74/100; PS5: 78/100; XSX: 75/100
OpenCritic	Critics Recommend: 84%

Review scores
Publication	Score
Digital Trends	4/5
Edge	5/10
Game Informer	8.5/10
GameSpot	8/10
GamesRadar+	2.5/5
IGN	8/10
PC Gamer (US)	73/100
TechRadar	4/5

Marvel Rivals received "mixed or average" reviews for the PC version and "generally favorable" reviews for the PlayStation 5 and Xbox Series X versions, according to the review aggregator website Metacritic.

Marvel Rivals has been praised for its monetization model, which does not involve pay-to-win elements (all gameplay elements such as heroes are free) and time limits on purchased battle passes.

Game Rant mentions the introduction of a "vote to surrender" feature in the game's competitive mode sparked debate within the player community. This feature allows teams to end matches early if a majority agrees, but only becomes available once a full round is played. Supporters argued it helps avoid frustrating, unwinnable situations, particularly during connectivity issues or unbalanced matches. Critics, however, feared it might foster a defeatist attitude and disrupt team dynamics, potentially leading to increased negativity and premature match endings. As of the June 26, 2025 patch, the developers made the surrender system more forgiving for teams that encounter a teammate that disconnected; the voting threshold to surrender now adjusts to the number of players remaining on your team, which rendered a positive reception from players.

=== Financial and player metrics ===
Marvel Rivals reached 10 million players worldwide within 72 hours of its release on December 6, 2024. The game's player base surpassed 20 million by December 17. During its first month, the game peaked at over 480,000 concurrent players and maintained most of its in-game player count on Steam. GameLook, a Chinese video game industry research outlet, estimated that Marvel Rivals generated approximately US$135 million in revenue across all platforms during this period. On the Newzoo chart, it ranked 6th among the top 20 games by revenue for December in the United States, United Kingdom, Germany, France, Spain, and Italy. Microsoft also reported that Marvel Rivals was among the Xbox games with the highest single-day active user counts throughout the year.

Following the launch of Season 1 in January 2025, Marvel Rivals again reached a peak of 644,269 concurrent players on Steam. It became the 14th highest-ranking game of all time on the platform by this metric. On the Newzoo chart, the game ranked 5th among the top 20 games by revenue for the same month in the United States, United Kingdom, Germany, France, Spain, and Italy. By February 2025, NetEase reported that the game had surpassed 40 million players worldwide. Sony reported that Marvel Rivals was the 3rd most downloaded free-to-play title on PlayStation 4 and PlayStation 5 in the United States and Canada, and 6th in Europe, during 2025. Valve reported that the game was also among the 12 best-selling titles on Steam through 2025. At Sony's PlayStation Partner Awards 2025, the game received a Grand Award in recognition of its status as one of "the top five titles developed in the Japan / Asia regions with the highest worldwide sales between October 2024 and September 2025".

In January 2026, Marvel Rivals recorded more than 200,000 concurrent players, following the launch of Season 6. The player count marked an increase from Season 5's launch peak of 160,000 and higher than the lowest point recorded during Season 4, which saw 132,000 concurrent players. As of June 2026, Marvel Rivals has over 50 million players worldwide.

=== Censorship ===
After release, discussion proceeded on in-game censorship of controversial terms beyond China's borders. Specifically, censorship of "Winnie the Pooh" caused speculation that the China-based developer NetEase blocked the phrase due to censorship of Winnie-the-Pooh in China. Other phrases restricted in China that are banned in-game include: "1989", "Tiananmen Square", "Free Taiwan", "Free Hong Kong" and terms pertaining to the persecution of Uyghurs in China. The censorship extends beyond content specific to China, also restricting words such as "ISIS", "Hitler", and "Epstein". Attempting to use these banned messages in the in-game chat will result in a message stating, "Text contains inappropriate content."

=== Accolades ===
Time named Marvel Rivals as one of "The 10 Best Video Games of 2025".

Year	Award	Category	Result	Ref.
2025	28th Annual D.I.C.E. Awards	Online Game of the Year	Nominated	
2025	The Game Awards 2025	Best Ongoing Game	Nominated	
2025	2025 Streamer Awards	Stream Game of the Year	Nominated	
2025	43rd Golden Joystick Awards	Still Playing Award - PC and Console	Nominated	
2025	Discord	Standout Server of 2025	Won	
2025	PlayStation Partner Awards 2025	Grand Award	Won	
2026	The Steam Awards 2025	Best Game You Suck At	Nominated	
2026	29th Annual D.I.C.E. Awards	Online Game of the Year	Nominated	
2026	24th Game Audio Network Guild Awards	Best Audio Mix	Pending	
2026	24th Game Audio Network Guild Awards	Best UI, Reward, or Objective Sound Design	Pending	
2026	24th Game Audio Network Guild Awards	Creative and Technical Achievement in Sound Design	Pending	
2026	22nd British Academy Games Awards	Evolving Game	Longlisted	
2026	17th Hollywood Music in Media Awards	Song - Video Game (Console & PC)	Pending	
