= List of adaptations of The Prince and the Pauper =

Mark Twain's 1881 novel The Prince and the Pauper has been adapted for the screen and television a number of times:

== Film ==
=== Direct or faithful adaptations ===
- The Prince and the Pauper (1909), a two-reel short that features some of the only known film footage of Mark Twain, shot by Thomas Edison at Twain's Connecticut home, starring Cecil Spooner as Edward VI and Tom Canty.
- The Prince and the Pauper (1915 film), directed by Hugh Ford and Edwin Stanton Porter; the first feature-length adaptation starring Marguerite Clark as Edward VI and Tom Canty.
- The Prince and the Pauper (1920 film) (German: Prinz und Bettelknabe), a 1920 Austrian film directed by Alexander Korda and starring Tibor Lubinszky as Edward VI and Tom Canty
- The Prince and the Pauper (1937 film), featuring Errol Flynn as Miles Hendon and Billy and Bobby Mauch as the title characters.
- The Prince and the Pauper (1962 film), a Disney feature film starring Guy Williams as Miles Hendon with Sean Scully playing both title characters
- The Prince and the Pauper (1977 film), starring Oliver Reed, Raquel Welch, Mark Lester, Ernest Borgnine, George C. Scott, Rex Harrison, and Charlton Heston; released in the US as Crossed Swords
- The Prince and the Pauper (2000), a television film directed by Giles Foster and starring Aidan Quinn as Miles Hendon, Alan Bates, Jonathan Hyde, and Jonathan and Robert Timmins as the title characters.

=== Loose translations, pastiches, and parodies ===
- Raju Peda (1954), a Telugu-version adaptation of the novel produced for Indian television
- Raja Aur Runk (1968), a Bollywood film directed by Kotayya Pratyagatma. The film "Indianizes" many of the episodes in the original story. This film is a big-screen remake of Raju Peda.
- Ringo (1978), TV special starring Ringo Starr, involving the former Beatles drummer trading places with his (fictional) talentless look-alike half-brother
- The Prince and the Pauper (1990 film), an animated featurette starring Mickey Mouse
- Class Act (1992), an urban re-telling starring Kid 'n Play
- Dave (1993), in which Kevin Kline plays an uncanny lookalike named Dave who is recruited by the Secret Service to become a stand-in for the President of the United States
- It Takes Two (1995), starring twins Mary-Kate and Ashley Olsen, in which two girls (one wealthy and the other an orphan, who resemble each other) switch places in order to experience each other's lives.
- Tere Mere Sapne (1996), a Bollywood film in which two boys born on exactly the same date switch places to experience the other's life, whilst learning valuable lessons along the way
- Baby Geniuses (1999)
- Barbie as the Princess and the Pauper (2004), an animated musical, with Barbie playing the blond Princess Anneliese and the brunette pauper Erika
- Garfield: A Tail of Two Kitties (2006), Garfield's second live-action film
- The Prince and the Pauper: Double Trouble (2007), a direct-to-video animated film produced by BKN International
- A Modern Twain Story: The Prince and the Pauper (2007), starring Dylan and Cole Sprouse
- Barbie: The Princess and the Popstar (2012), an animated musical adaptation in which Barbie plays a blonde princess named Victoria (Tori) and a brunette popstar named Keira who magically change places
- The Princess Switch (2018), a Netflix adaptation starring Vanessa Hudgens
- Barbie in Rock 'N Royals (2015), an animated music adaption in which Barbie plays Courtney, a princess who accidentally goes to Camp Pop instead of Camp Royalty. Meanwhile, Erika accidentally ends up at Camp Royalty, in Courtney's place.
- Barbie: Princess Adventure (2020), Barbie plays herself and goes to the fictional kingdom of Florovia, where she meets Princess Amelia, and the two switch places.

== Television ==
=== Direct or faithful adaptations ===
- The Prince and the Pauper (1955), BBC television adaptation by Rhoda Power, consisting of six thirty-minute episodes, with Tegid Wyn-Jones as Edward, Dwyryd Wyn-Jones as Tom Canty, Alan Edwards as Miles Hendon and James Raglan as Lord Hertford
- DuPont Show of the Month (1957), single-episode adaptation with Johnny Washbrook as Tom Canty and Rex Thompson as Prince Edward
- The Prince and the Pauper (1962), produced by Walt Disney Productions for Walt Disney's Wonderful World of Color, a three-part adaptation filmed in Shepperton, England, featuring Guy Williams as Miles Hendon. Both Prince Edward and Tom Canty were played by Sean Scully, using an early version of the split-screen technique which the Disney studios use in the 1961 film The Parent Trap.
- The Prince and the Pauper (1976), a six-part episode of the PBS series Once Upon a Classic
- The Prince and the Pauper (1976), BBC television adaptation by writer Richard Harris, consisting of six thirty-minute episodes (re-broadcast in 1977 as two sixty-minute episodes), with Nicholas Lyndhurst in the starring role and Barry Stokes as Miles Hendon
- The Prince and the Pauper (1996 TV series), a six-part BBC series starring James Purefoy, with Keith Michell reprising his role of Henry VIII, and screenplay by Julian Fellowes
- The Princess & the Pauper (2000), from the 1995 original HBO Family animated series Happily Ever After: Fairy Tales for Every Child depicting a feminist twist with two African-American girls Zoe and Princess Olivia, both played by Raven-Symoné.

=== Rough translations, pastiches, and parodies ===
- "The Prince and the Paupers" (1967), the 21st episode of The Monkees
- "P.J. and the President's Son" (1976), a modern American-based ABC Afterschool Special with Lance Kerwin playing the dual role
- "Duel and Duality" (1987), an episode of Blackadder the Third where the Prince Regent believes that the Duke of Wellington is after him. The prince swaps clothes with Blackadder (his butler) and says, "This reminds me of that story 'The Prince and the Porpoise'." Blackadder corrects him: "Pauper. The Prince and the Pauper."
- "The Prince and the Pooch" (1996), an episode of Wishbone with Wishbone playing both Tom Canty and Edward VI
- "Princess for a Day" (2006), an episode of JoJo's Circus had a similar plot.
- "Double, Double, Boy in Trouble" (2008), an episode of The Simpsons
- "Dawn of a Royal Day!" an episode of the anime Pokémon DP: Sinnoh League Victors had a similar plot.
- Jake & Blake (2010), an Argentine television series which started out as a parody of The Prince and the Pauper, but turned to a more serious plotline as the show progressed
- "Princess for a Day" (2011), an episode of Olivia (season 2, episode 4) with Olivia portrays the upper-class Princess Anneliese and Stephanie portrays the lower-class pauper Erika who switch places for a while.
- "Make Play" (2011), an episode of Phineas and Ferb (season 2, episode 64), with Candace switching places with Princess Baldegunde of Duselstein and discovering that royal life is dull
- "The Switch" (2013), an episode of Thomas and Friends with a similar plot.
- "The Princess and the Pickpocket" (2017), an episode of the anime series Princess Principal. The characters Ange and Princess Charlotte have their history revealed by Ange under the guise of a fairy tale. Ten years prior to the start of the series, Ange, who was actually the real Princess Charlotte, met Princess, who was actually a common pickpocket named Ange and looked identical to her. They befriended one another and eventually decided to trade places for a day. Soon after the switch, however, a revolution broke out and divided their country, separating the girls and leaving them trapped in each other's roles.
- "Night and Day, You Are the Ones!" (@021), an episode of Pokémon Master Journeys: The Series had a similar plot
- "The Hair Dignitary" (2021), an episode of Tom and Jerry in New York (season 2, episode 3), with Monty switching places with Tom, playing with Jerry instead of chasing
- "A Holiday in Oshiina Town: Princess Yui" (2022), an episode of the anime Delicious Party Pretty Cure had a similar plot and the similar plot of Robin Hood

== Stage ==
- The Prince and the Pauper, a 1889 adaptation by Abby Sage Richardson
- The Prince and the Pauper, a 1920 adaptation by Amélie Rives Troubetzkoy
- The Prince and the Pauper, a 1963 musical adaptation with book/lyrics by Verna Tomasson and music by George Fischoff
- The Prince and the Pauper, a 1970 adaptation by Anne Coulter Martens
- The Prince and the Pauper, a 1995 adaptation by Lewis Hardee
- The Prince and the Pauper, a 1997 adaptation by Dan Neidermyer
- The Prince and the Pauper, a 2002 musical adaptation with music by Neil Berg, lyrics by Neil Berg and Bernie Garzia, and book by Bernie Garza and Ray Roderick
- The Prince and the Pauper, a 2002 adaptation by R. Rex Stephenson
- The Prince and the Pauper, a 2005 adaptation by James DeVita
- The Prince and the Pauper, a 2005 adaptation by Thomas W. Olson
- The Prince and the Pauper, a 2012 adaptation by Jemma Kennedy
- The Prince and the Boy, musical adaptation with music by Toshihiko Sahashi and Izumitaku, and lyrics by Yutaka Watanabe and Koji Ishizaka

== See also ==
- Cultural depictions of Edward VI of England
- Trading Places, a 1983 comedy that draws heavily on the plot outline for The Prince and the Pauper
