= The Prince and the Pauper (disambiguation) =

The Prince and the Pauper is an 1881 novel by Mark Twain.

The Prince and the Pauper may also refer to:

- The Prince and the Pauper (1915 film), a lost silent adaptation of the novel
- The Prince and the Pauper (1920 film), an adaptation starring Tibor Lubinszky as Edward VI and Tom Canty
- The Prince and the Pauper (1937 film), an adaptation starring Billy and Bobby Mauch
- The Prince and the Pauper (1976 series), an adaptation starring Nicholas Lyndhurst
- The Prince and the Pauper (1977 film), an adaptation starring Mark Lester as Edward VI and Tom Canty
- The Prince and the Pauper (1990 film), an animated Mickey Mouse short
- The Prince and the Pauper, a 1995 animated film produced by Golden Films.
- The Prince and the Pauper, a 1996 animated film produced by Phoenix Animation Studios.
- The Prince and the Pauper, a 1996 BBC TV mini-series adapted by Julian Fellowes.
- The Prince and the Pauper (2000 film), starring Aidan Quinn and Alan Bates, directed by Giles Foster

== See also ==
- List of adaptations of The Prince and the Pauper
- The Princess and the Pauper, a 1939 American animated short film
- Barbie as the Princess and the Pauper, a 2004 animated musical fantasy film
