= Coronation of Edward VI =

1547 coronation in England

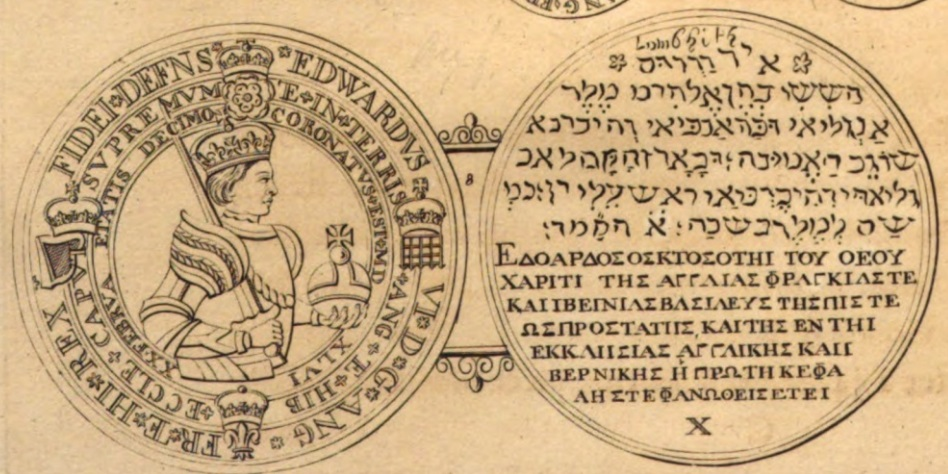
- Medallion commemorating the coronation of Edward VI, with text in Latin, Hebrew and Greek
- Date: 20 February 1547; 479 years ago
- Location: Westminster Abbey, London, England
- Participants: Edward VI; Thomas Cranmer, Archbishop of Canterbury; Peers of the Realm

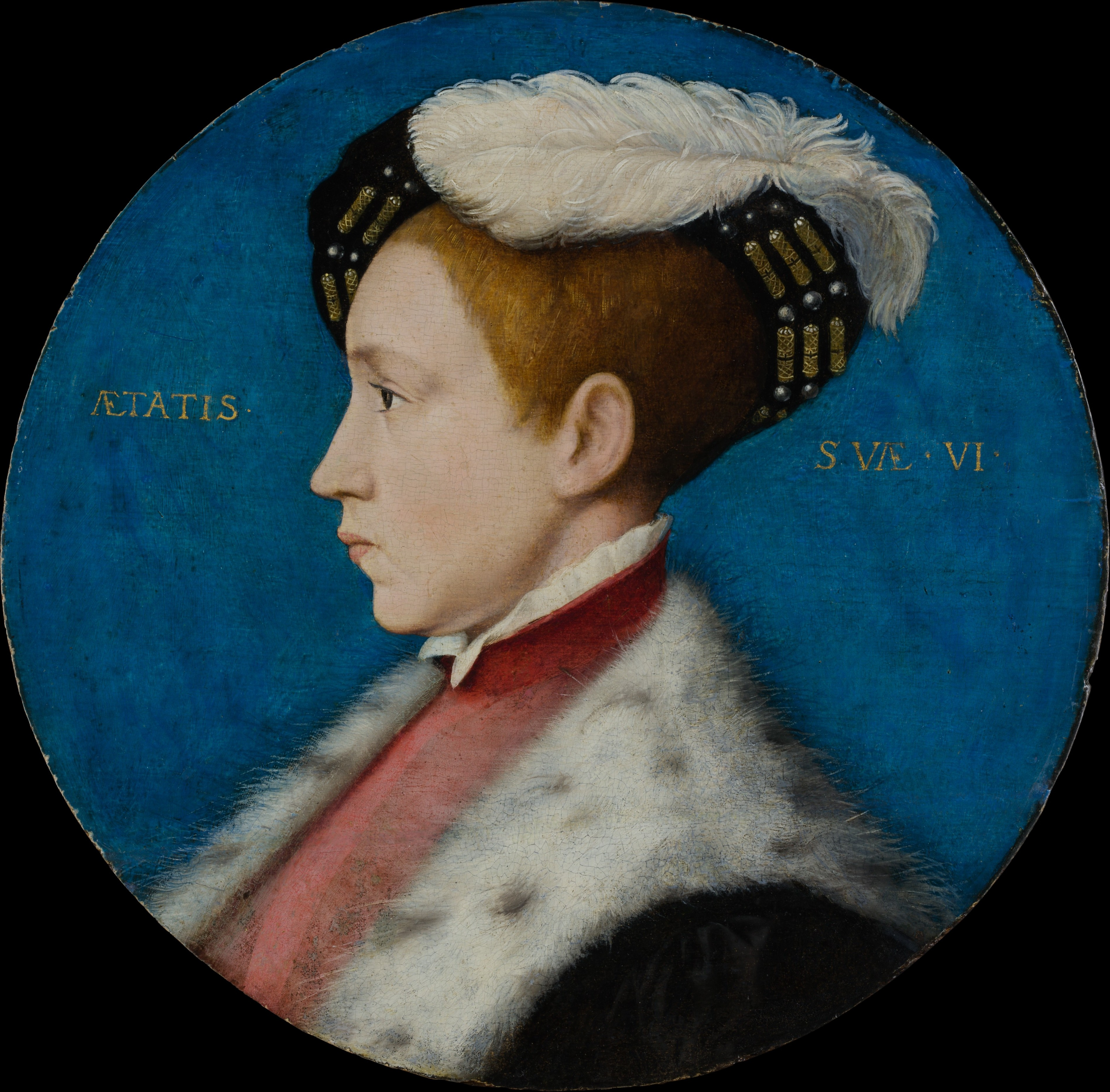
Edward VI, Metropolitan Museum of Art

The coronation of Edward VI as King of England and Ireland took place at Westminster Abbey, London, on 20 February 1547. Edward ascended the throne following the death of his father, King Henry VIII.

== Background ==
King Henry VIII died on 28 January 1547. His son, Edward VI, was nine years old. He was brought from Hertford Castle to Enfield, where he joined his half-sister Elizabeth. He was proclaimed king on 30 January. Edward later wrote that the cause of his father's death was dropsy. Henry was buried at Windsor next to Jane Seymour, Edward's mother, on 16 February.

The Privy Council deliberated on the late King's will concerning the succession. Using the Liber Regalis, they made some changes to the traditional order of coronation ceremonies, avoiding making any doctrinal comments on the proceedings, and explained:

for the tedious length of the same which should weary and be hurtsome peradventure to the King's Majesty being yet of tender age fully to endure and bide out; and also for that many points of the same were such as by the laws of the realm at this present were not allowable.

The day chosen for the coronation was Shrove Sunday. An order of service was drawn up under the authority of the Lord Protector, Edward Seymour, 1st Duke of Somerset, and the executors of Henry VIII. After Edward was crowned with St Edward's Crown, the Protector would be first to hold up his hand to pay homage.

The king's older half-sisters Mary and Elizabeth and attendant ladies and gentlewomen seem not to have been invited or present at the coronation events, possibly due to considerations of relative precedence and expense.

Contemporary descriptions of the ceremonies of his royal entry on 19 February and the coronation on 20 February are held by the College of Arms and the Society of Antiquaries.

== A new crown for Edward ==
Three crowns would be used, including a new "imperial" crown made by the goldsmith Everart or Everard Everdyes from gold, precious stones, and pearls. The word "imperial" signifies the style of a crown, with raised arches. Everdyes used scrap gold from the Secret Jewel House including a set of nine letters "I" or "J", perhaps originally made for Edward's mother Jane Seymour. The new crown was set with pearls from Henry VIII's collars and caps, and may have included the large balas ruby of the Black Prince, a stone sourced in Myanmar. Everdyes' crown was detailed in Edward's inventory:

Item a Crowne of golde Imperiall made for the kinges majestie our Soveraigne Lorde Edwarde the vj^{th} the nether Border sett with ix pointed diamountes and ix Settes of peerles and v peerles in every sett being uppon the same border certeyne Borders of Antiques of golde sett with viij rocke Rubies and xx peerles with foure borders which make the Crown Imperiall sett with iiij Emeraldes iiij rubies and iiij diamountes with lxxj peerles and with a Lardge Ballace in the toppe percede, sett with a litell crosse of golde in the toppe of the Ballace enameled.

Everdyes also made a coronet for the Duke of Somerset, embellished with Henry VIII's diamonds. After the coronation, he returned unused pearls taken from the jewels of Henry VIII to the Jewel House. His workshop was located at Westminster Palace. In 1604 the large ruby in Everdyes' crown was described again as "a verye greate ballace perced".

New costume for the coronation was embroidered with damask gold and silver thread by Guillaume Brellant and Thomas and William Ibgrave. The fur used to edge the royal gowns was supplied by Katherine Addington.

== Procession and pageants ==
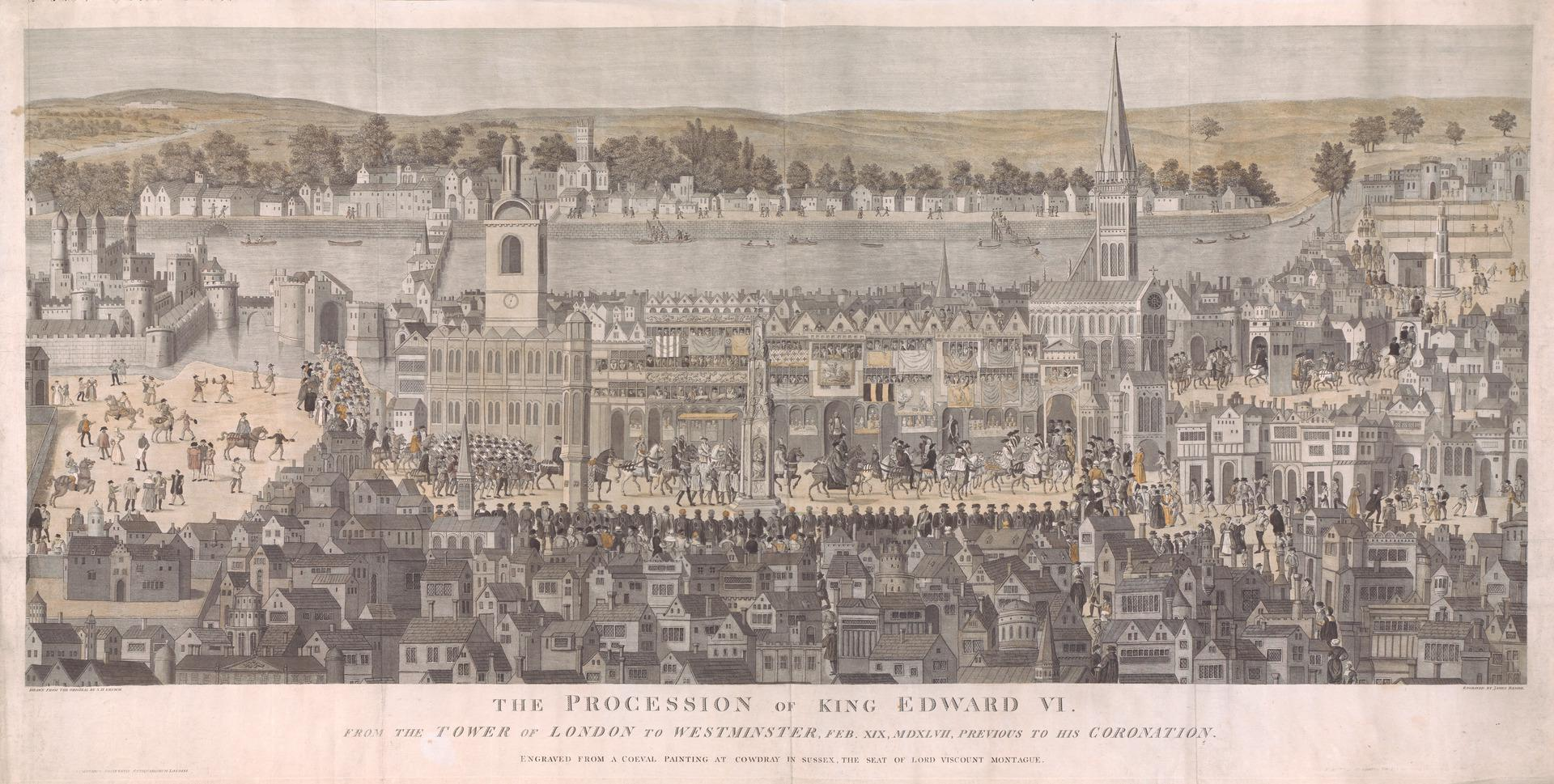
Edward's coronation procession, from a wall painting at Cowdray House.

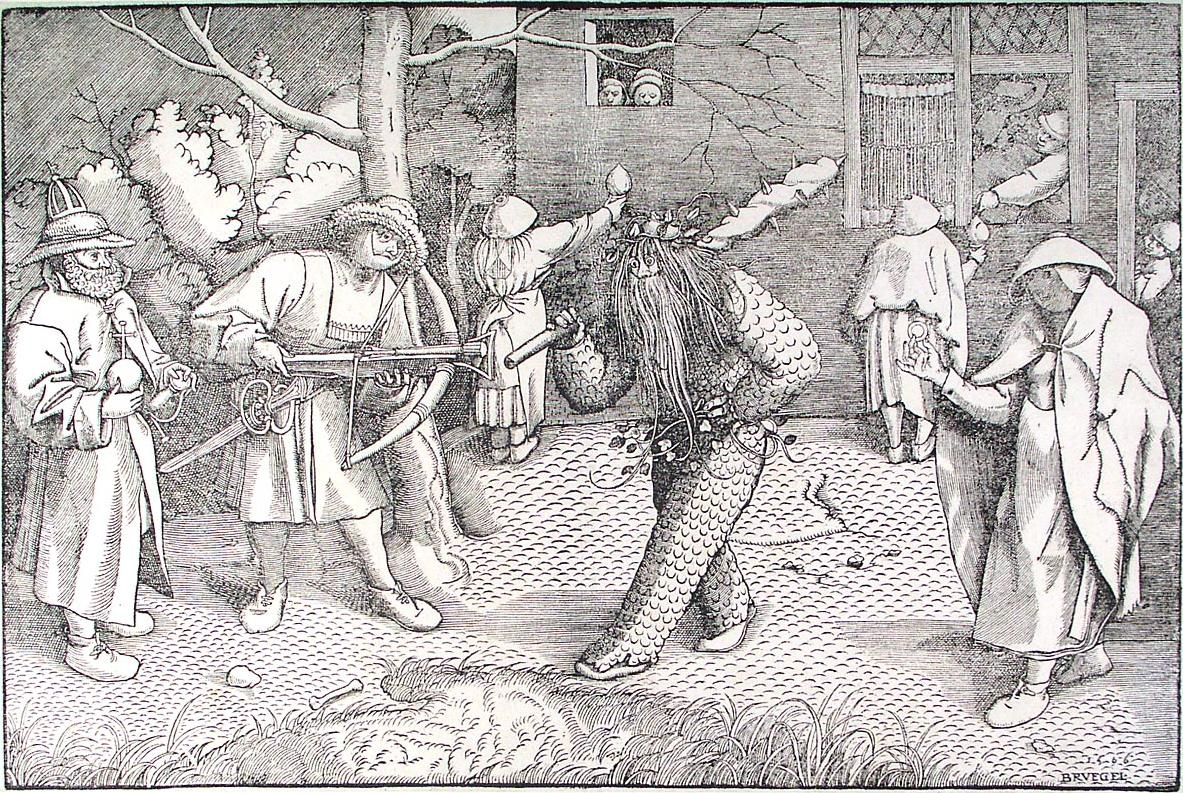
16th-century woodcut of actors performing as the adult twin warriors Valentine and Orson

Edward and his entourage travelled in a royal entry procession from the Tower of London to Westminster through the city of London on 19 February. Two gentleman ushers, John Norris and William Raynesford, dressed in vintage costume as the Dukes of Normandy (or Gascony) and Guyenne, represented Edward's claim to these territories. Edward was dressed in a "rich gown of cloth of silver all over embroidered with damask gold". During the procession, he sometimes walked a little ahead of the ceremonial canopy held above him, so "the people might better see his grace".

Citizens of London were taxed to pay for the shows and pageants. Edward was greeted at Cheapside by actors playing Valentine and Urson (Orson). These were twin brothers, warriors who had been lost as children. Urson was brought up by a bear and became a wild man or wodewose, while Valentine was found in a forest by Pepin the Hunchback and raised as a courtier. In the London pageant, they undertook to defend King Edward. Urson's verses included:

For I wild Urson doth here signify
an emperor's son of excellent majesty
notwithstanding in a forest nourished by a bear,
where many knights I there did conquer;
thus I am come, being nothing afraid
of all the rebels to defend King Edward;
whensover they come, early or late,
I shall them thrash here at the gate.

The pageants at Cheapside were based on a performance staged in 1432 for the return of Henry VI of England from France. The script involved material from Robert Fabyan's edition of the works of John Lydgate.

At Fleet Street, Edward was addressed by "Ancient Truth", who had been restored by Henry VIII and looked forward to Edward's reign as a "young King Solomon". At St Paul's, an acrobat, "a man from the nation of Aragon", slid down a cable or tightrope from the steeple battlements "so swiftly as he had been a bird", or "an arrow out of a bow". Edward watched him perform more tricks on the rope, and "laughed right hartely". This was the only place where the procession paused for any length of time; the king at times bypassing pageants and ignoring speeches made to him.

== Coronation ==
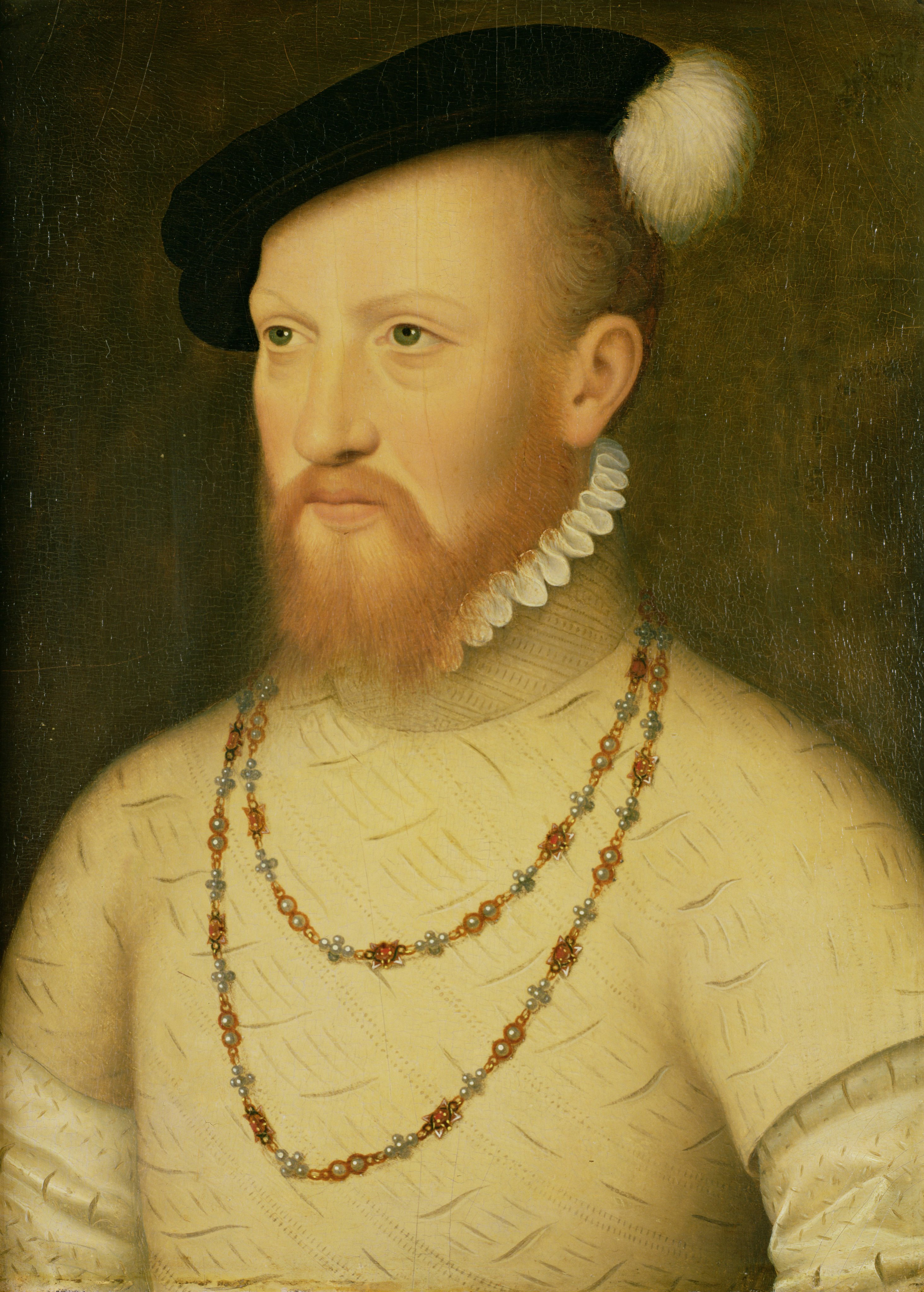
Edward Seymour, 1st Duke of Somerset, as Lord Protector, helped the Archbishop with the king's three crowns.

The ceremony in the Abbey involved the Coronation Chair, which survives today. The chair, described as the "great white chair" was draped with rich white fabrics, supplied by William Green. On the back of the "white chair" were two carved lions on the corner posts and a fleur-de-lis on a turret topping the centre. The chair was placed on steps on a stage called a "mounting scaffold" watched and guarded by the ushers, John Norris, William Raynesford, Richard Greenway, and Richard Blount of Iver and Mapledurham.

Edward showed himself at the four corners of the scaffold and Thomas Cranmer, Archbishop of Canterbury said the words of "recognition", inviting the congregation to assent to the coronation by their "duties of allegiance". As Edward was required to move to various positions in the abbey during the service, the ushers carried him in a portable chair.

The coronation oath had been amended to reflect the Reformation; mention of the privileges of the clergy were omitted and a veiled reference to the Parliament of England was introduced, that new laws would be made "by the consent of your people". In his sermon, Cranmer set out a Protestant agenda by likening Edward to the Biblical Josiah, who had destroyed the pagan idols in Jerusalem, and said the new king would see "the tyranny of the Bishops of Rome banished from your subjects and images removed". Edward was crowned by the Archbishop of Canterbury. Somerset assisted in the crowning, and with the Archbishop, brought the three crowns, a newly made crown, the Imperial State Crown and St Edward's Crown, to the altar and "set them one after another on his head".

A general pardon for prisoners was issued, excepting the Duke of Norfolk, Edward, Lord Courtenay, son of the Marquess of Exeter, Master Fortescue or Foskew, Cardinal Pole, and Doctor Pates. Some sources add Nicholas Throckmorton to the exceptions from the pardon.

== Banquet ==
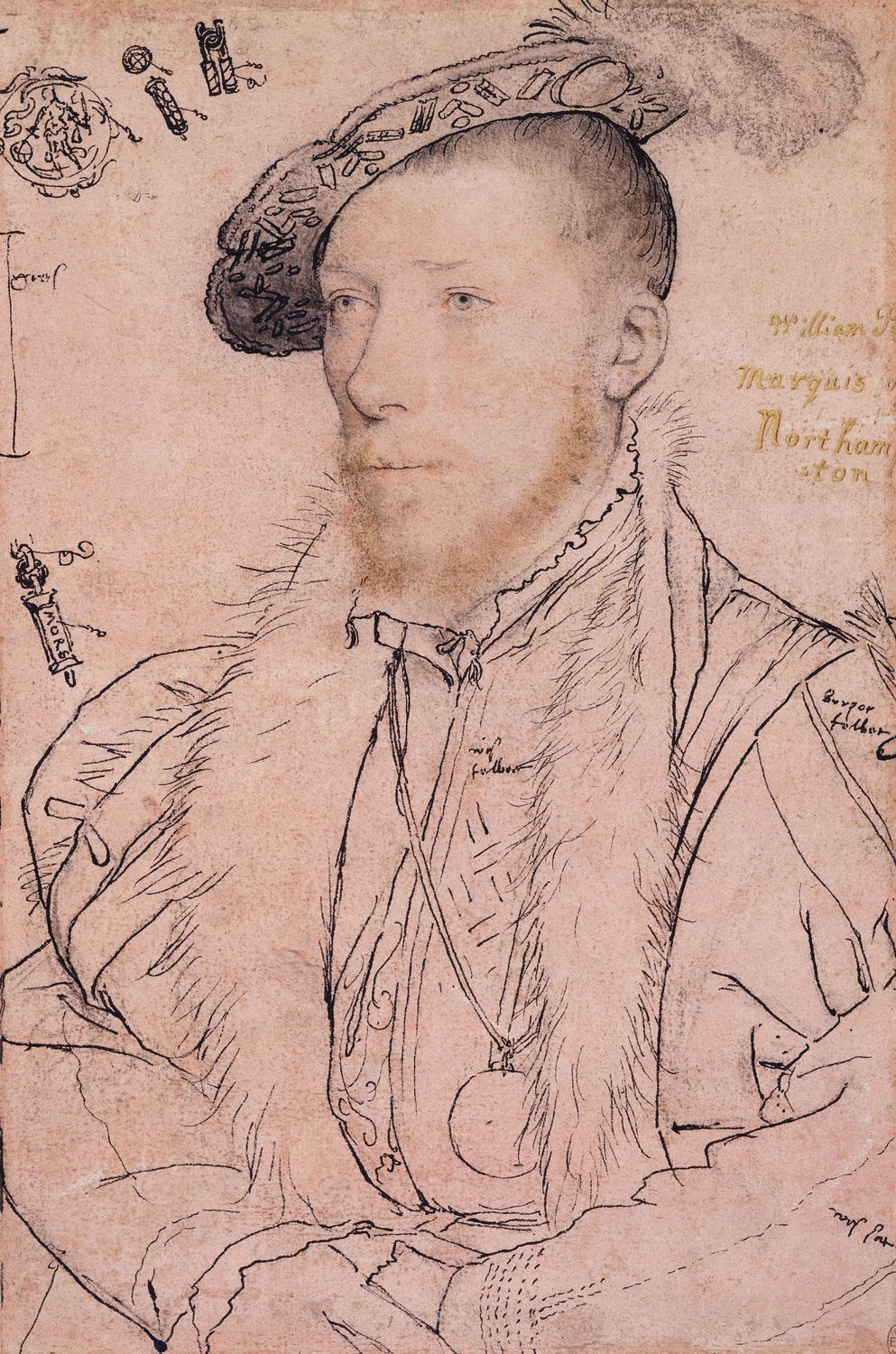
William Parr, 1st Marquess of Northampton tasted the food at the coronation feast.

Edward came into Westminster Hall from the abbey in procession. He wore the new crown made by Everart Everdyes. The Marquess of Dorset was Constable of England, and the Earl of Arundel was Earl Marshal. They rode into Westminster Hall at the service of the first course. The Marquess of Northampton was carver and he assayed, or tested, the food. The Earl of Rutland held the king's towel in the place of Alan Apsley.

At the conclusion of the service of dinner, the King's Champion, Dymoke of Scrivelsby, rode into the hall in armour. He cast down his gauntlet as a challenge to any who questioned the king's right. Edward gave him his gold cup, and he was rewarded with the value of his arms and armour. At the end of the meal the spiced wine hippocras was served, followed by a course or "void" of spices and sugar confections.

== Tournaments and masques ==
On Monday 21 February there was jousting, and a tournament on 22 February. The competitors included Thomas Seymour, Anthony Kingston, Peter Carew, Francis Knollys, and Edward Shelley. According to John Hooker, Carew was newly married and wore his wife's glove as a favour on his helmet. Shelley was killed in Scotland later in the year at the battle of Pinkie.

After the tournament, or on the next evening, there was an interlude or "farce" which included the theatrical presentation of Orpheus on a mount (refurbished by Niccolo da Modena), and a masque including players dressed as friars and cardinals. Edward may have performed in this entertainment in costume.

English soldiers at Boulogne held a tournament to celebrate the coronation. Instead of tilting, they held courses of running at the ring. One team of six were dressed "like Turks". Spectators were impressed by the performance of Henry Dudley.

== In fiction ==
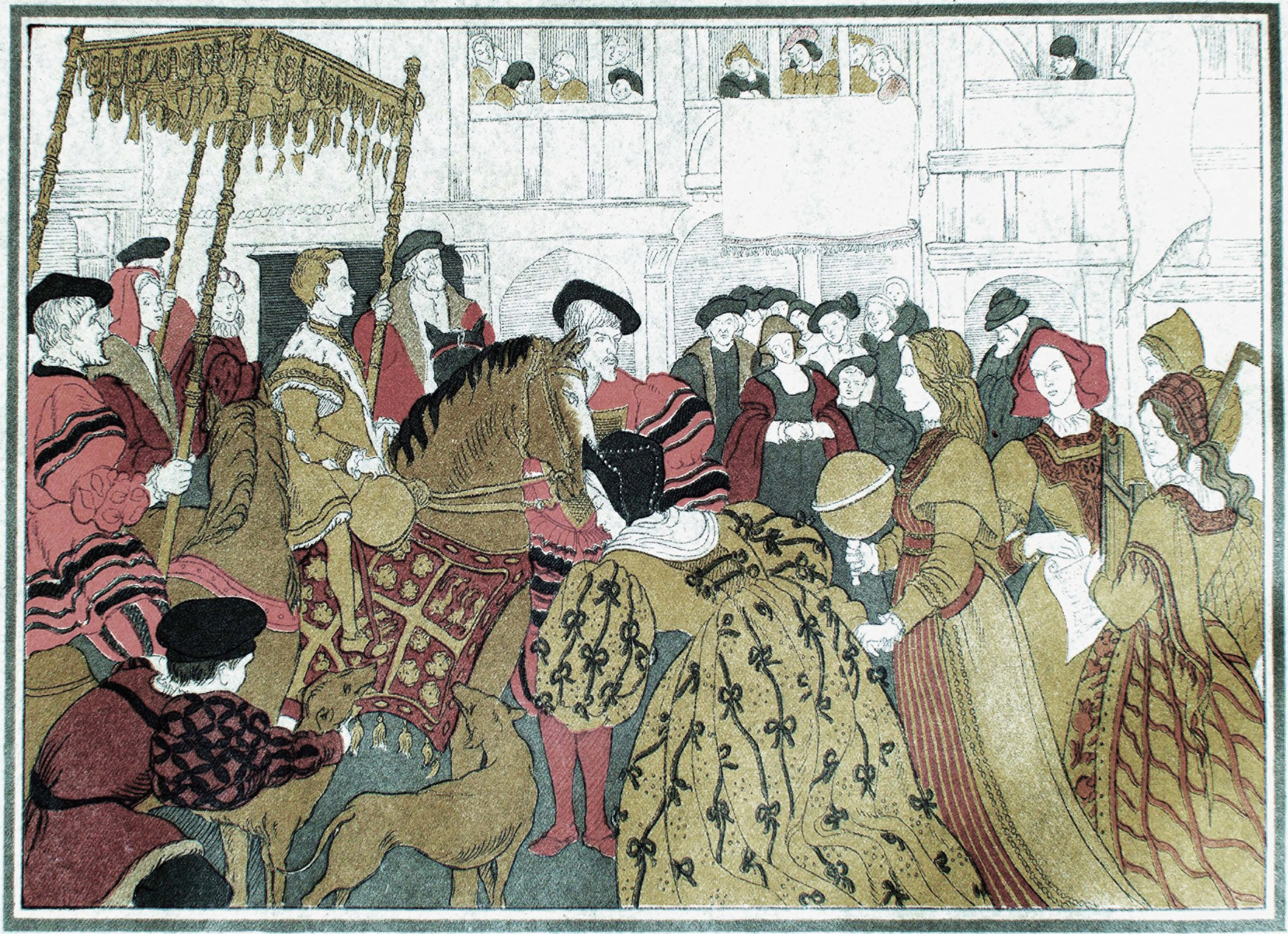
Illustration of how the coronation of Edward VI would have been depicted in The Masque of the Edwards, a pageant proposed for the 1902 coronation of Edward VII.

The coronation of Edward VI is the backdrop of Mark Twain's 1881 novel The Prince and the Pauper. In the novel Edward is lost and helped by Miles Hendon to reach the abbey before the lookalike Tom Canty is crowned. The novel has been adapted as a stage play and filmed many times, including, The Prince and the Pauper (1977 film) in which Hendon was played by Oliver Reed.

Twain may have read of the pageant of Valentine and Orson in his researches. Chronicle accounts of the reign of Mary I mention an imposter, William Featherstone, the son of a miller and a servant of Peter Meutas, who claimed to be Edward VI in 1555. He was shown to the people in Westminster Hall, and imprisoned. Featherstone was hanged in March 1555.

== See also ==
- Cultural depictions of Edward VI
