= The Prince and the Pauper (2000 film) =

- Directed by: Giles Foster
- Written by: Duke Fenady; Dominic Minghella
- Based on: The Prince and the Pauper; 1881 novel by Mark Twain
- Produced by: Howard Ellis
- Starring: Aidan Quinn; Alan Bates; Jonathan Timmins; Robert Timmins; Perdita Weeks
- Cinematography: Nyika Jancsó
- Edited by: David Yardley
- Music by: Stanislas Syrewicz
- Production company: HCC Happy Crew
- Distributed by: Hallmark Entertainment
- Release date: 1 December 2000
- Running time: 91 minutes
- Countries: United Kingdom; Hungary
- Language: English

The Prince and the Pauper is a British action adventure film of 2000 directed by Giles Foster, based on the 1881 novel The Prince and the Pauper by Mark Twain. It stars Alan Bates, Aidan Quinn, and the twin brothers Jonathan and Robert Timmins as the lookalikes King Edward VI and Tom Canty.

== Plot ==
In the 16th-century City of London, a poor boy called Tom Canty is bullied by his criminal father into stealing five shillings from a stranger. He is chased and escapes by getting through a gate into a palace garden. There, he meets and befriends Edward, Prince of Wales. They find they look very alike and that each craves the life of the other, so they swap clothes. Edward is then mistaken for Tom and marched out of the palace by guards. A stranger, Sir Miles Hendon (Aidan Quinn), meets the boy and takes him to join Tom's father, John Canty. They fight, and Canty believes he has killed Miles, so flees from London into the country, taking Edward with him. Meanwhile, in the palace, Tom does not know how to play the part of a prince and reveals who he is to the scheming Lord Hertford (Jonathan Hyde). Edward's father, Henry VIII (Alan Bates), falls seriously ill, and after giving orders that no one is to go on doubting that Tom is his son, he dies. Tom is accepted by the court as king. Word of these developments reaches John Canty and Edward, on the run, before Canty is killed in a fight. Edward again meets Miles, recovered and very much alive, who takes him to Hendon Hall, his family seat, where they find Miles's younger brother Hugh has seized his property. Hugh imprisons Miles and Edward, but they escape, and Edward persuades Miles that he is not Tom but the new king.

On the day of the coronation, Edward and Miles travel to Westminster. Edward is able to halt the ceremony, and he and Tom are again able to exchange their clothes and identities. Archbishop Cranmer and others are suspicious, but Edward produces the Great Seal of the Realm to prove who he is. Afterwards, Edward gives Tom an official position, and Miles is restored to his lost honours.

== Cast ==
- Aidan Quinn as Sir Miles Hendon
- Jonathan Timmins as Prince Edward
- Robert Timmins as Tom Canty
- Alan Bates as King Henry VIII
- Ian Redford as John Canty
- Alison Newman as Ann Canty
- Jonathan Hyde as Lord Hertford
- Tim Potter as Chief Gentleman
- James Greene as Archbishop Cranmer
- Perdita Weeks as Lady Jane Grey
- James Saxon as Abbot
- Lajos Balázsovits as High Sheriff
- Paul Brooke as Magistrate
- Ruth Platt as Sarah
- János Gyuriska as Hugh Hendon
- Márta Bakó as Grandmother Canty
- Gyula Mesterházy as Prince's Servant
- László Áron as Court Physician
- Michael Mehlmann as Gentleman of the Balm
- Luke Smith as Kitchen Boy
- Aaron Keeling as Daniel Hunter
- Sam Jones as Stephen Bartlett
- Joanna Bacon as Woman with Applecart
- Sándor Téri as Bystander
- Zoltán Gera as Merchant
- Zoltán Bezerédy as Ruffian
- Piroska Molnár as Farmer's Wife
- Laszlo Gorog as Magistrate's Clerk
- Ben O'Brien as Constable
- Tibor Szervét as Palace Guard

== Production ==
The use of twin brothers to play Tom and the Prince echoes the casting of Billy and Bobby Mauch in a previous production starring Erroll Flynn, The Prince and the Pauper (1937).

The picture was filmed on location in and around Budapest, Hungary, and most of the minor roles were played by local Hungarian actors.

== See also ==
- Cultural depictions of Edward VI
- Cultural depictions of Henry VIII
