= Cultural depictions of Edward VI =

Edward VI, King of England, has been depicted in popular culture a number of times.

== Literature ==
Edward VI is a central character in Mark Twain's 1881 novel The Prince and the Pauper, in which the young prince and a pauper boy named Tom Canty, who bears a strikingly uncanny resemblance to Edward, deliberately exchange places. This ultimately leads to the eventual alarm and discomfort of both. Ultimately, both are saved by a semi-impoverished nobleman named Sir Miles Hendon.

Edward VI is the main character of Janet Wertman's The Boy King, the final instalment in the Seymour Saga trilogy.

In the young adult novel Timeless Love by Judith O'Brien, the main character, Samantha, goes back in time and finds herself with Edward VI. Other historical characters in the book include Lady Jane Grey, the Duke of Northumberland, Princess Elizabeth and Barnaby Fitzpatrick.

Green Darkness (1972) by Anya Seton has Edward VI visiting the estate where the heroine lives.

Heirs of Squire Harry (1974) by Jane Lane accurately portrays the political intrigue in the court of the young king, who is beset by ruthless ambitious men and overshadowed by his sisters.

== Film ==
Edward has been played on film by the following actors, mainly in versions of The Prince and the Pauper:

- Tibi Lubinsky in the Austrian silent film The Prince and the Pauper (1920)
- Forbes Dawson in the British silent film Lady Jane Grey; Or, The Court of Intrigue (1923)
- Desmond Tester in Tudor Rose (1936)
- Bobby Mauch in The Prince and the Pauper (1937)
- Rex Thompson in Young Bess (1953) and The Prince and the Pauper (1957)
- Mark Lester in The Prince and the Pauper (1977)
- Warren Saire in Lady Jane (1986)
- Cole Sprouse in A Modern Twain Story: The Prince and the Pauper (2007)

== Television ==
Edward has been played on television by the following actors, again mainly in versions of The Prince and the Pauper:

- Sean Scully in The Prince and the Pauper (1962), part of the American series Disneyland
- Jason Kemp in the BBC series Elizabeth R (1971)
- Nicholas Lyndhurst in The Prince and the Pauper (1976), a BBC television adaptation by writer Richard Harris
- Philip Sarson in the British drama The Prince and the Pauper (1996)
- Jonathan Timmins in the British drama The Prince and the Pauper (2000)
- Byron Long as Edward in Elizabeth I: Red Rose of the House of Tudor (2000), the HBO adaptation of The Royal Diaries novel of the same name.
- Hugh Mitchell in the Granada Television serial Henry VIII (2003), with Ray Winstone as Henry
- Eoin Murtagh and Jake Hathaway in the Showtime series The Tudors (2007–2010), with Jonathan Rhys Meyers as Henry VIII
- Matthew Fenton (2012) and James McNicholas (2017 - Present) in Horrible Histories
- Ashley Gyngell in the BBC documentary England's Forgotten Queen: The Life and Death of Lady Jane Grey (2018)
- Oliver Zetterström in the Starz drama series Becoming Elizabeth (2022)
