= Coronation of King Edward =

Coronation of King Edward may refer to:

- Coronation of Edward VI in 1547
- Coronation of Edward VII in 1902
- Abandoned coronation of Edward VIII in 1937
