= Edward VIII coins =

Coins of the United Kingdom, 1936

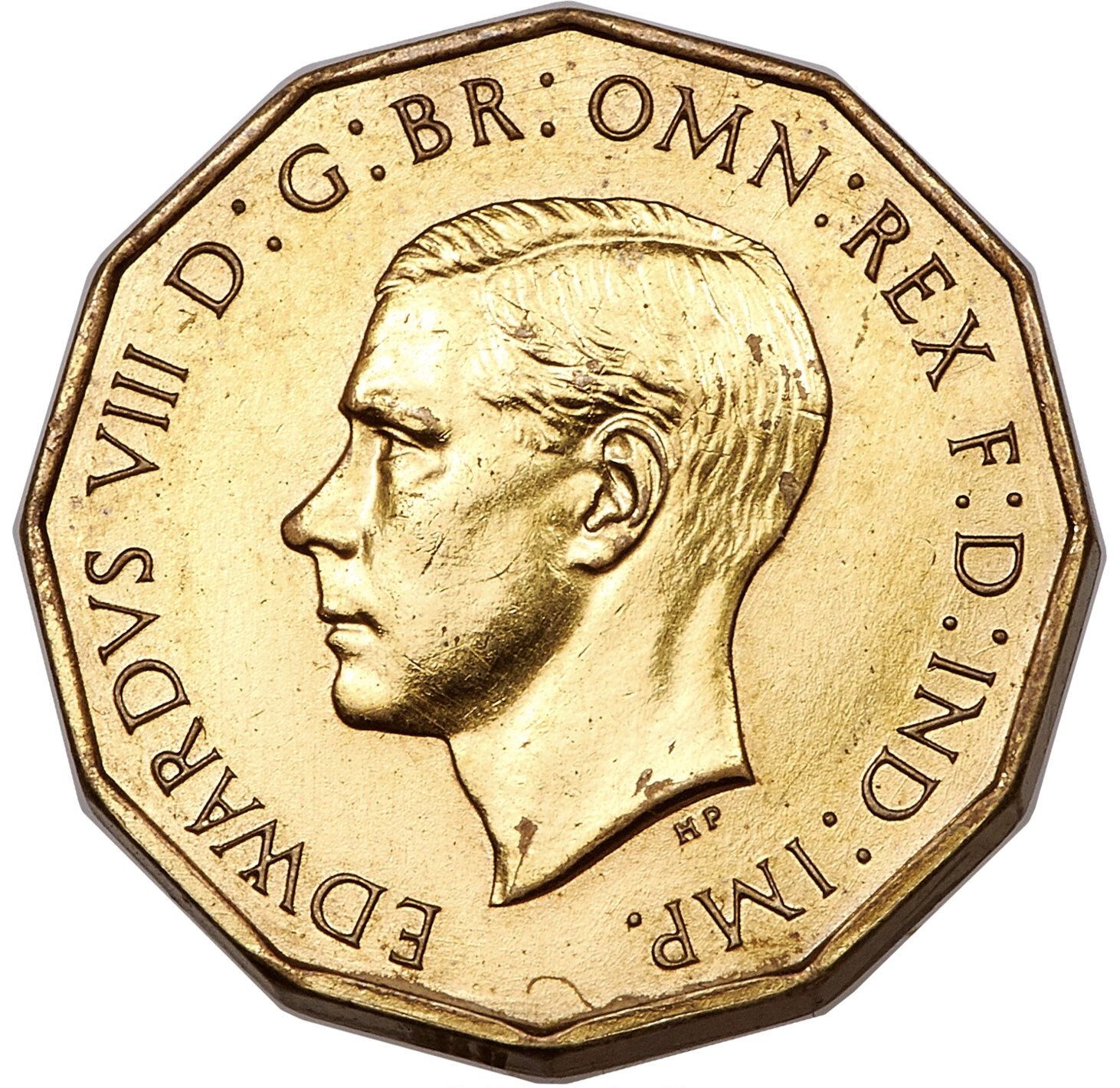
Edward VIII threepence

Edward VIII coins are a series of coins from the United Kingdom and other territories of the British Empire that were produced in 1936 upon the accession of King Edward VIII. Because of his short reign of just 326 days and eventual abdication, many never entered circulation and remained only as pattern pieces.

The exact number of Edward VIII coins in existence is unknown. The vast majority of the coins from the United Kingdom were melted down by the Royal Mint after the King's abdication. Many pattern issues are retained by the Royal Mint Museum, with other surviving coins purchased by private collectors. In 2020, an Edward VIII sovereign sold at auction for £1 million, the most for a British coin. On 26 March 2021, a five pound gold coin sold at auction for $2,280,000, surpassing the previous record.

== United Kingdom ==
Striking of Edward VIII's coinage was scheduled to begin on 1 January 1937, one month after he abdicated in December 1936. Royal Mint reports from 1935–1936 suggest that over 200 dies for coins, medals, and seals had already been produced in preparation. Many of these were eventually destroyed by the Mint. Six four-pieces gold coin sets were also produced to celebrate the abandoned coronation; however, today it is estimated that only two complete sets remain, one in the Royal Mint Museum and the other owned by the private Tyrant Collection. The majority of the surviving pattern pieces (numbering just over a hundred) are either at the Royal Mint, in the British Museum or the Royal Collection. Between 30 and 40 pattern pieces are known to be in private hands.

Coin	Known specimens	Notes
Farthing		
Half Penny		
Penny	1	
Three Pence	6	
Six Pence		
Shilling		
Two Shillings		
Half Crown		
Crown		
Sovereign	6	Of the six originally struck, four are in museums and institutions and two are privately owned.
Double Sovereign	6	
Five pound	6	

== Kutch and Jodhpur princely states ==
Some parts of the British Empire issued coins in the name of Edward VIII. Kutch, an Indian princely state was one such. Another was the State of Jodhpur although these 1936 issues are difficult to identify. Coins of Kutch carried the name of the local ruler on one side and the British monarch on the other. In 1936, the Princely State of Kutch first issued coins in the name of Khengarji III (the local ruler) and George V, followed by Edward VIII, and then George VI. Common denominations include silver coins of 1 kori, 2.5 kori, and 5 kori.

== Other issues ==
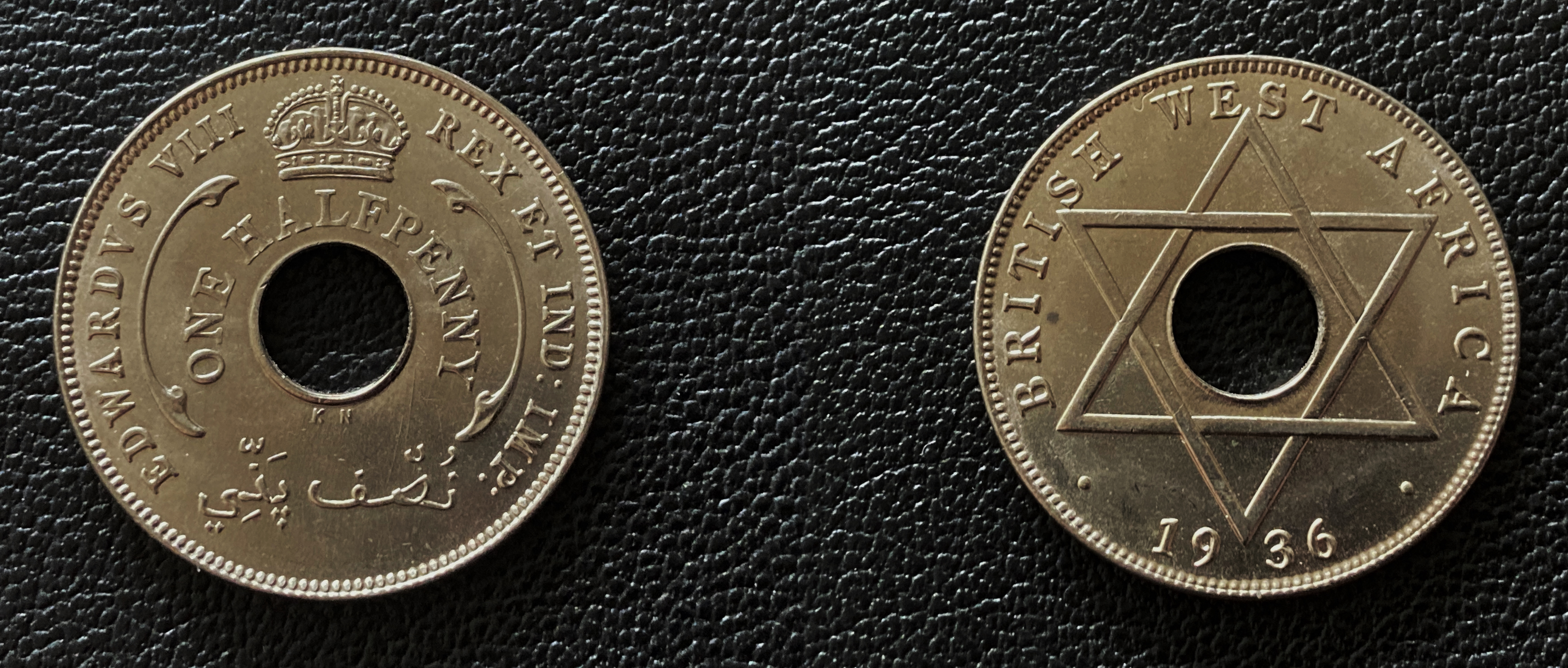
Ha'penny from British West Africa

The colony of Fiji issued a one penny Edward VIII coin in 1936 as did the Australian-administered Territory of New Guinea. Additional issues were made for British West Africa (three values) and East Africa (two values). None of these have an effigy because of a hole in the middle of the coins, but they do carry the inscription "Edward VIII" except for New Guinea which has the cypher "ERI".

== Reproduction coins ==
Although no official circulating coins were produced with an effigy of King Edward VIII, several private mints have manufactured numerous replica coins bearing such an effigy. Most of these are dated 1936 or 1937 even if manufactured years later. This has allowed collectors to have full range of coins for all the recent reigns.

== Auctions ==
Date	Coin	Price	Notes
2010	13 coin pattern set	£1,350,000 ($2.1 million)	
2019	One Penny	£111,000	Final price including buyer premium was £133,200
2021	Five pound gold coin	$2,280,000	
