= The Prince and the Pauper (1915 film) =

1915 silent film directed by Edwin Stanton Porter

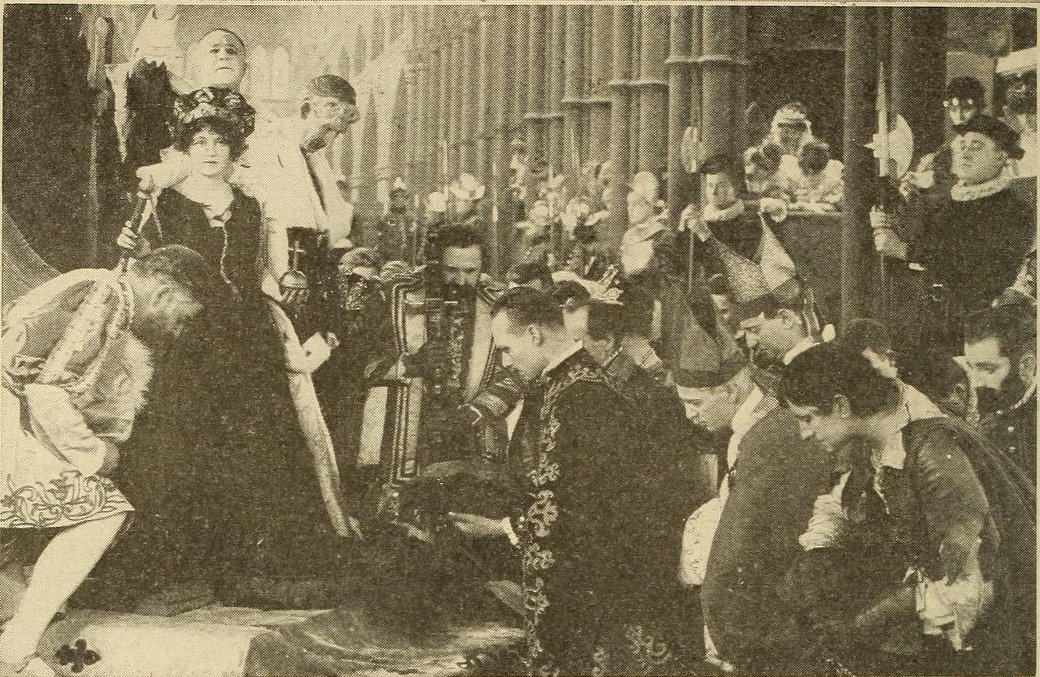
- Publicity still
- Directed by: Edwin S. Porter; Hugh Ford
- Written by: Hugh Ford
- Based on: The Prince and the Pauper; 1881 novel by Mark Twain
- Produced by: Famous Players Film Company; Daniel Frohman
- Starring: Marguerite Clark
- Distributed by: Famous Players–Lasky; Paramount Pictures
- Release date: November 29, 1915
- Running time: 50 minutes
- Country: United States
- Language: Silent film (English intertitles)

The Prince and the Pauper is a lost 1915 American silent adventure film starring Marguerite Clark based on the 1881 novel by Mark Twain. The film was produced by the Famous Players Film Company and was directed by Edwin S. Porter and Hugh Ford.

== Plot ==
In this Mark Twain story of mistaken identity, Marguerite Clark plays two different young men, the well to do Prince of Wales and a poor boy of the streets.

== Cast ==
- Marguerite Clark - Prince Edward/Tom Canty
- Robert Broderick - The King
- William Barrows - Earl of Hertford
- William Sorelle - Miles Hendon
- William Frederic - Tom Canty's Father
- Alfred Fisher - Father Andrew
- Nathaniel Sack -
- Edwin Mordant -

== See also ==
- The House That Shadows Built (1931 promotional film by Paramount); a possibility that the unnamed Marguerite Clark clip is from The Prince and the Pauper.
