= Abandoned coronation of Edward VIII =

Cancelled coronation in the United Kingdom

- Date: 12 May 1937 (cancelled)
- Location: Westminster Abbey, London, England

The planned coronation of King Edward VIII of the United Kingdom was scheduled to take place at Westminster Abbey on 12 May 1937, a date that had been selected and widely publicised well in advance. In anticipation of the historic event, extensive preparations were underway, and a variety of commemorative souvenirs had already been produced and made available for sale. However, the coronation never occurred. On 11 December 1936, Edward abdicated the throne amid a constitutional crisis triggered by his determination to marry Wallis Simpson, an American socialite and divorcée. His decision met with strong political and public resistance, ultimately leading to his renunciation of the throne. The abrupt cancellation of the coronation left manufacturers and retailers with large stocks of now-obsolete memorabilia, and coins bearing Edward’s image, which were scheduled for release in January 1937, were withdrawn and melted down. Edward's brother George VI and sister-in-law Elizabeth were crowned on the same date instead.

== Accession ==
In January 1936, King George V died and his eldest son, Edward, succeeded him as king. Edward VIII was unmarried, but the American socialite Wallis Simpson had accompanied him on numerous social occasions in years leading up to 1936. She was married to shipping executive Ernest Aldrich Simpson and had previously been divorced. Her relationship with the new king had not yet been reported in the British press.

== Preparation ==
=== Planning ===
The Coronation Committee had been delayed when it met for the first time on 24 June 1936; Ramsay MacDonald, the Lord President of the Council, met with the Duke of Norfolk, to discuss the proceedings. MacDonald chaired the Coronation Committee as a whole, and the Duke, who was the hereditary Earl Marshal with responsibility for coronations, chaired the executive committee. While Edward VIII was away, cruising on the Nahlin with Wallis Simpson, his brother Albert, Duke of York (the future George VI) sat in his place on the committees. Edward had initially been reluctant to have a coronation at all (asking the Archbishop of Canterbury whether it could be dispensed with), but conceded that a shorter service would be acceptable. His desire for a lower-key event led to abandonment of plans for a royal procession through London the following day, the thanksgiving service at St Paul's Cathedral and the dinner with London dignitaries.

=== Archbishop of Canterbury ===
Although the executive committee was chaired by the Earl Marshal, the Archbishop of Canterbury, Cosmo Lang, was also a driving force behind the preparations for the coronation and many of the decisions in respect to the order of service were made by or with him. Owing to his office, he was a member of both the Coronation Committee and the executive committee which dealt with the details, and he attended all of the rehearsals. He took a leading role in the planning process, becoming a key mediator when queries arose, and he dealt with questions over how the service should be broadcast by the media.

== Abdication ==
The king's desire to marry a woman thought by many to be unsuitable was the public reason for the constitutional crisis that led to his abdication from the throne on 11 December 1936. While plans for the coronation went ahead for a different monarch, thousands of businesses were stuck with hundreds of thousands, if not millions, of pounds' worth of souvenirs and memorabilia with Edward's face or monogram on them.

== Disposing of memorabilia ==
=== Coins ===
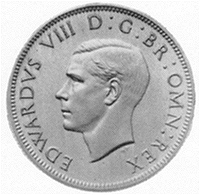
Trial shilling coin featuring King Edward VIII, designed by Humphrey Paget

Due to the brevity of his reign, both proof and circulation strikes of Edward VIII's coinage are extremely rare, and highly desired by numismatists.

While silver coinage was not supposed to be issued until just before the coronation was to take place, the new brass three-penny bit was already being made for introduction early in January 1937, and the entire stock was melted down. The same was done for other coins in Commonwealth realms, although rumours of a Canadian dollar surviving persist.

Fewer than a dozen Edward VIII proof sets are believed to have survived.

A few gold sovereigns were released, and the Royal Mint has a collection of pattern designs for Edward's coinage.

The British possessions of British East Africa, British West Africa, and Fiji, along with the Australian-administered Territory of New Guinea, minted a total of seven low-denomination coins with his name, but no image. Three Indian states, Jodhpur, Jaipur, and Kutch, each produced a coin with his name in the local scripts.

Prior to the introduction of coinage for the reign, twelve coins were sent to vending machine manufacturers to enable calibration of their machines. They were never returned to the Royal Mint; six are held in private hands and are worth thousands of pounds. The other six are still missing. In 2020, an Edward VIII sovereign was sold at auction for £1 million, the most auctioned for a British coin. The following March, a five pound gold coin surpassed the record by its sale at auction for $2,280,000.

=== Postage stamps ===
==== United Kingdom ====
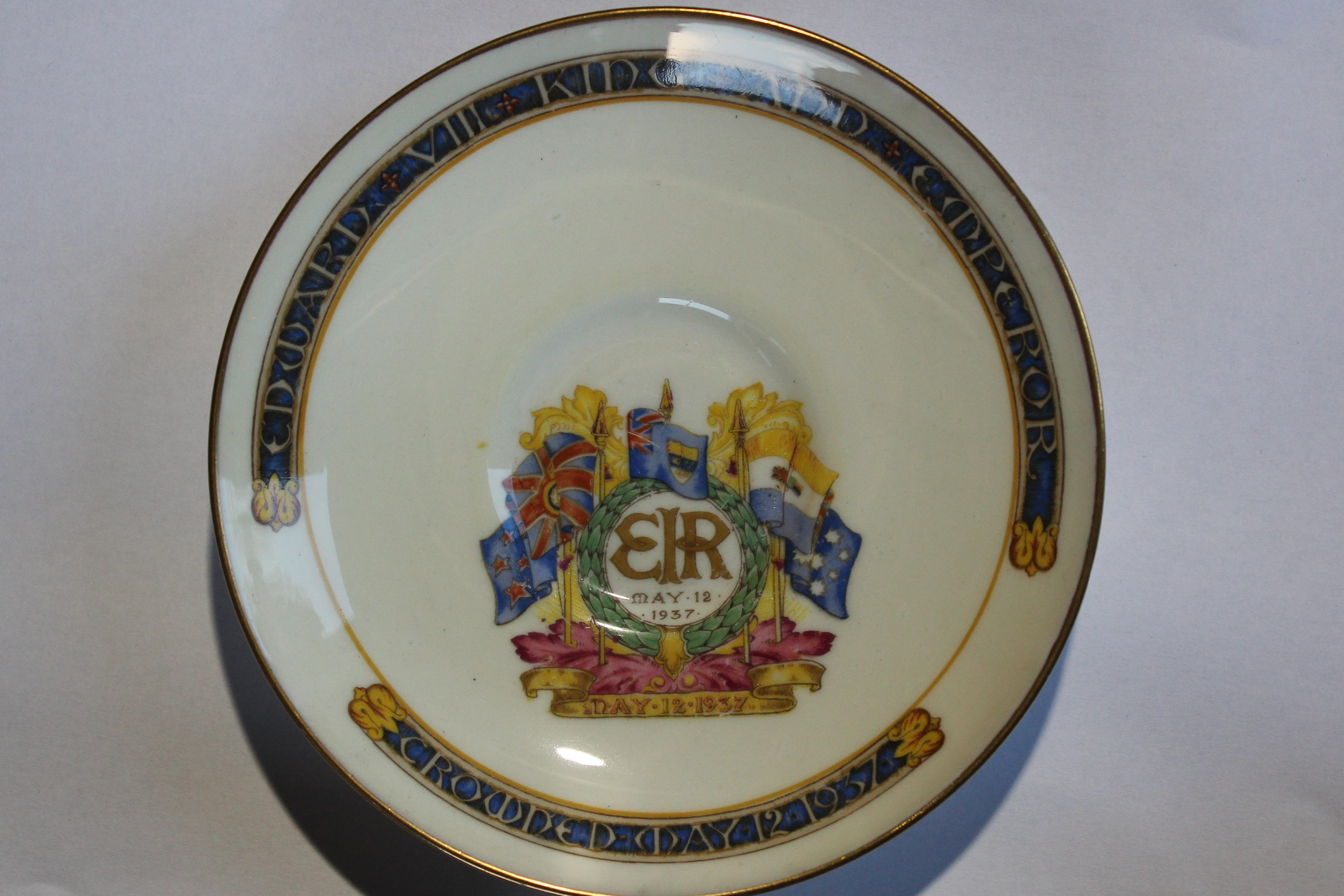
Commemorative saucer produced for the coronation with monogram EIR (Eduardus Imperator Rex, "Edward Emperor [and] King"); large amounts of such memorabilia had to be destroyed unsold when the coronation was cancelled.

As early as the beginning of the reign in January 1936, the British Post Office were preparing two issues after the series of four definitive stamps that was considered to be an "Accession issue". Therefore, work at the Post Office and Harrison & Sons was done for a "Coronation issue" intended for 12 May 1937 and a final "Definitive issue". Essays for the former were made with the king wearing different military uniforms, such as the Bertram Park's pictures of Edward VIII wearing the uniforms of the Welsh Guards and Seaforth Highlanders. In March 1936, the king accepted the idea of larger stamps picturing his effigy and castles. However, the abdication ended all design work despite essays having been made.

==== Australia ====
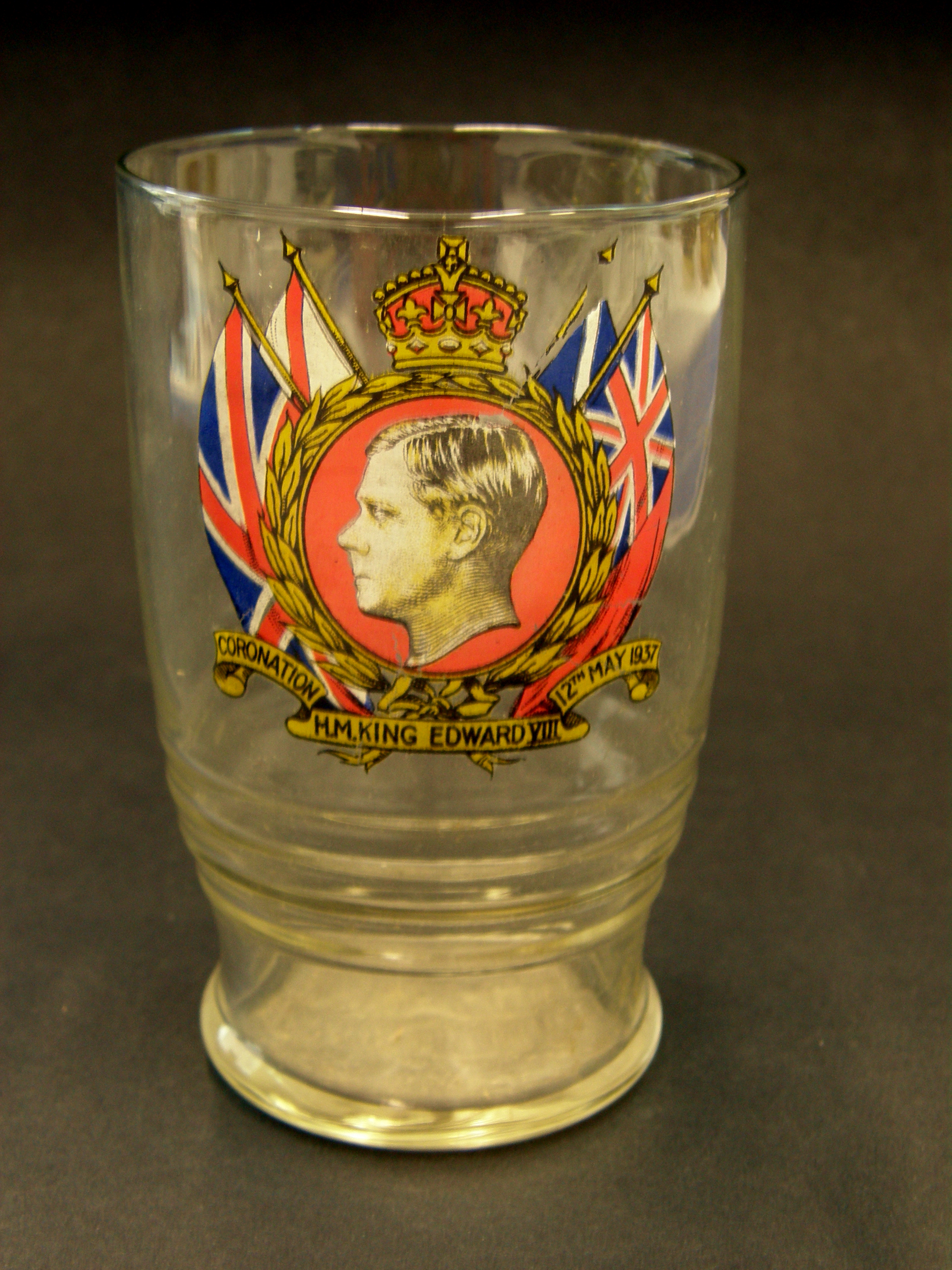
Commemorative glass tumbler, produced for the coronation of King Edward VIII, planned for 12 May 1937

The two-penny red stamp project of Australia used a photograph of the king in uniform. The sole ornaments were the denomination in an oval in the bottom right corner and the red "POSTAGE" bar at the bottom. Printing of this stamp began in September 1936 at the Commonwealth Bank of Australia's printing branch. All operations were stopped after the abdication.

Despite the destruction of the stock and all material needed for the printing, a signed corner block of six of the two-penny stamps is in the hand of a British collector. On 29 September 1936, William Vanneck, 5th Baron Huntingfield, Governor of Victoria, visited the plant and was invited to sign and date one of the finished sheets. In the name of the Commonwealth Bank, printer John Ash offered the sheet to the Governor in October, but had to claim it back on 16 December. The sheet was given back the next day, but the six-stamp corner block bearing the signature was missing. The Governor had already sent it to someone in England and could not retrieve it. The stamps still exist and sold for US$123,000 at auction in 2015.

==== Canada ====
In Canada, the official destruction of Edward VIII stamp dies and proofs took place on 25 and 27 January 1937; some essays were kept in the archives and the two plaster casts were saved by coin engraver Emmanuel Hahn and a postal officer.

=== Other memorabilia ===
There are stories of schools retrieving commemorative mugs and plates from pupils and replacing them with ones designed for the new king and queen, while many vendors put the redundant items up for sale anyway.

== See also ==
- Coronation of the British monarch
