= William Featherstone =

William Featherstone or Fetherstone (died 1557) was an imposter who claimed to be Edward VI of England.

Chronicle accounts of the reign of Mary I and the diary of Henry Machyn mention an imposter, William Featherstone, the 18-year-old son of a miller and a servant of Peter Meutas. He claimed to be Edward VI in February 1555; the real Edward had died in July 1553. Featherstone was arrested in Southwark and questioned at Hampton Court by the Privy Council. He claimed to have been directed by others, but was disbelieved and sent to the Marshalsea prison as a "lunatic fool".

He was shown to the people in Westminster Hall in May 1555, whipped and released. Subsequently he claimed that Edward VI was still alive and he had spoken to him. Featherstone was convicted of high treason, and hanged and quartered at Tyburn on 13 March 1557. His head was placed on London Bridge.

== See also ==
- The Prince and the Pauper
