= The Prince and the Pauper (1937 film) =

1937 film by William Dieterle, William Keighley

- Directed by: William Keighley
- Screenplay by: Laird Doyle; Catherine Chisholm Cushing
- Based on: The Prince and the Pauper; 1881 novel by Mark Twain
- Produced by: Jack L. Warner; Hal B. Wallis
- Starring: Errol Flynn; Billy and Bobby Mauch; Claude Rains; Henry Stephenson
- Cinematography: Sol Polito; George Barnes
- Edited by: Ralph Dawson
- Music by: Erich Wolfgang Korngold
- Production companies: Vitaphone; Warner Bros. Pictures
- Distributed by: Warner Bros. Pictures
- Release date: May 8, 1937
- Running time: 118 minutes
- Country: United States
- Language: English
- Budget: $858,000
- Box office: $1,691,000

The Prince and the Pauper is a 1937 film adaptation of the 1881 novel of the same name by Mark Twain. It starred Errol Flynn, twins Billy and Bobby Mauch in the title roles, and Claude Rains and has been described as "a kids' fantasy".

The film was originally intended to coincide with the planned coronation of Edward VIII in 1936. However, its release was delayed until the following year. The film was released on May 8, 1937, four days before the coronation of King George VI and Queen Elizabeth.

The second theme of the final movement of Erich Wolfgang Korngold's violin concerto was drawn from the music he composed for this film.

== Plot ==
In Tudor England, two boys are born on the same day in the most different circumstances imaginable. Tom Canty is the son of vicious criminal John Canty, while Edward Tudor is the Prince of Wales and the son of King Henry VIII of England. One grows up in poverty, hungering for something better, taught to read and reason by the wise Father Andrew. The other dwells in isolated luxury, and possesses a strong curiosity about the outside world.

They meet and are astounded by their striking resemblance to each other. As a prank, they exchange clothes, but the Captain of the Guard mistakes the prince for the pauper and throws him out of the palace grounds. Tom is unable to convince anybody except for the Earl of Hertford of his identity. Everyone else is convinced that he is mentally ill. When Henry VIII dies, Hertford threatens to expose Tom—condemning him to a traitor's death—unless he does as he is told. Hertford also blackmails the Captain into searching for the real prince to eliminate that dangerous loose end.

Meanwhile, Edward finds an amused, if disbelieving, protector in Miles Hendon. Hendon's opinion of Edward's story changes after Hertford, fearing for his power if the real king lives, instigates an attempt to assassinate the boy. With Hendon's help, Edward manages to re-enter the palace just in time to interrupt the coronation ceremony and prove his identity. Edward becomes King Edward VI while Tom is made a ward of the new king, Hertford is banished for life, and Hendon is rewarded for his services (one of these being the right to sit in the presence of the king).

== Cast ==
- Errol Flynn as Miles Hendon
- Billy Mauch as Tom Canty
- Bobby Mauch as King Edward VI
- Claude Rains as the Earl of Hertford
- Henry Stephenson as the Duke of Norfolk
- Barton MacLane as John Canty
- Alan Hale, Sr. as The Captain of the Guard
- Eric Portman as The First Lord
- Lionel Pape as The Second Lord
- Leonard Willey as The Third Lord
- Murray Kinnell as Hugo Hendon
- Halliwell Hobbes as The Archbishop
- Phyllis Barry as The Barmaid
- Ivan F. Simpson as Clemens
- Montagu Love as Henry VIII of England
- Fritz Leiber as Father Andrew
- Elspeth Dudgeon as John Canty's Mother
- Mary Field as Mrs. Canty
- Forrester Harvey as The Meaty Man
- Joan Valerie as Lady Jane Seymour
- Lester Matthews as St. John
- Robert Adair as The First Guard
- Harry Cording as The Second Guard
- Robert Warwick as Lord Warwick
- Rex Evans as Rich Man
- Holmes Herbert as The First Doctor
- Ian MacLaren as The Second Doctor
- Anne Howard as Lady Jane Grey
- Gwendolyn Jones as Lady Elizabeth
- Lionel Braham as Ruffler
- Harry Beresford as The Watch
- Lionel Belmore as The Innkeeper
- Ian Wolfe as The Proprietor
- Ernie Stanton as Guard (uncredited)
- Leo White as Jester (uncredited)

== Production ==
Warner Bros had Billy and Bobby Mauch under contract, and had used them separately in Anthony Adverse, The White Angel and The Charge of the Light Brigade. The studio announced The Prince and the Pauper as part of their line up in June 1936. (They bought the rights to the story from Twain's estate for $75,000.)

Patric Knowles was cast for the role of Miles in October. However Jack L. Warner then decided he wanted someone with a bigger name and asked Errol Flynn to do it.

== Reception ==
According to Warner Bros records, the film earned $1,026,000 domestically and $665,000 foreign making it the studio's most popular film of the year.

Frank S. Nugent of The New York Times wrote, "Bobby and Billy justify their twinship completely, not merely by investing the Twain legend of mistaken royal identity with a pleasing degree of credibility, but by playing their roles with such straightforwardness and naturalness that the picture becomes one of the most likable entertainments of the year ... The novel and the screen have been bridged so gracefully we cannot resist saying the Twain and the movies have met." Variety published a negative review, reporting: "The fragile plot scarcely holds together a full length screen play", and suggesting that its running time could have been trimmed at the beginning so Flynn could enter the film earlier. John Mosher of The New Yorker praised the film as "a fine spectacle". Harrison's Reports called it "An excellent costume picture" with "outstanding" performances.
