= Tom Canty =

- The Prince and the Pauper character
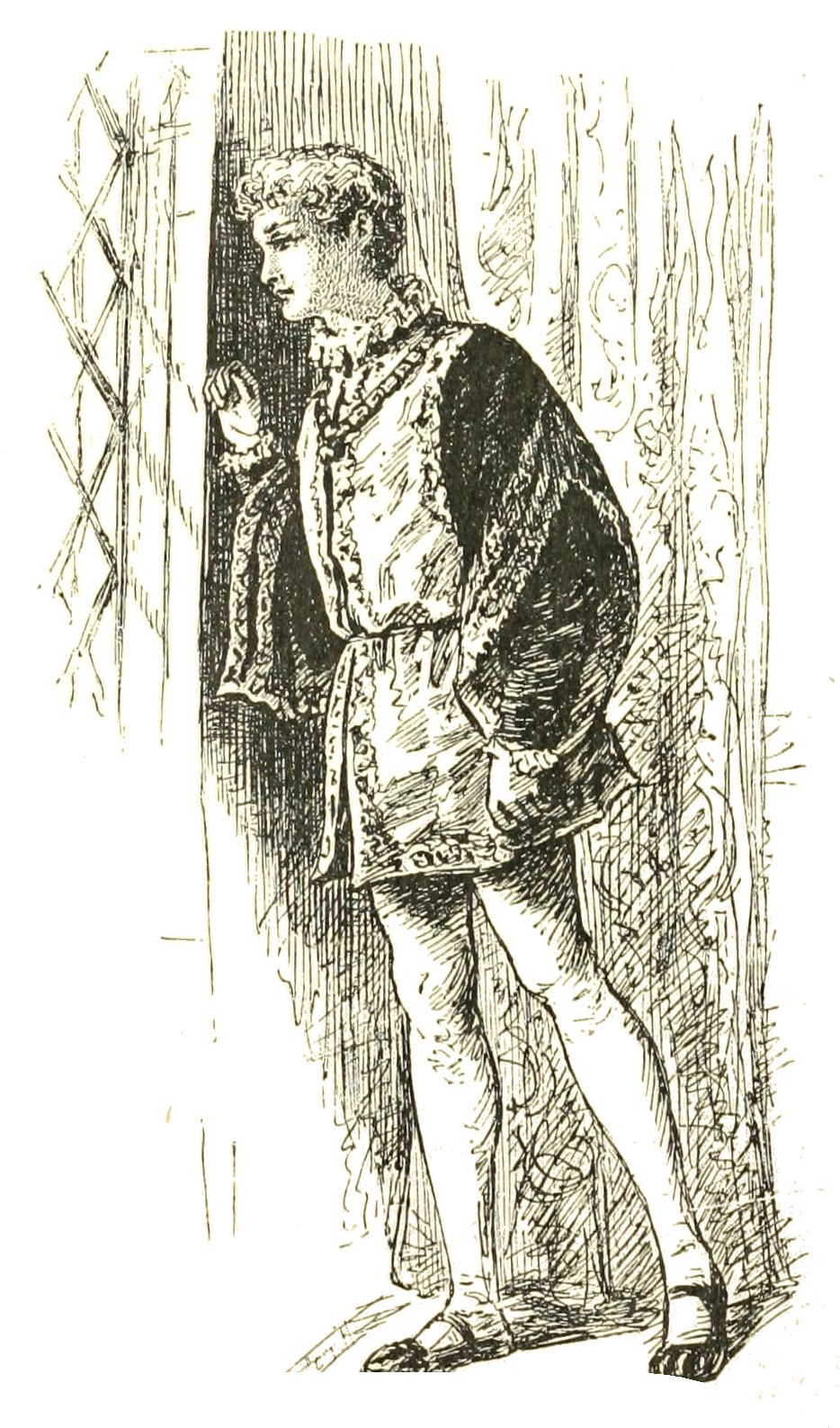
- 1882 illustration by Frank T Merrill.
- Created by: Mark Twain
- Portrayed by: Tibor Lubinszky; Billy Mauch; Sean Scully; Nicholas Lyndhurst; Mark Lester; Philip Sarson; Robert Timmins; Dylan Sprouse

In-universe information
- Gender: Male
- Occupation: Beggar and Prince of Wales
- Family: John Canty (father); Mrs. Canty (mother); Elizabeth "Bet" Canty (sister); Anne "Nan" Canty (sister); Gammer Canty (grandmother)
- Nationality: English

Thomas "Tom" Canty is a fictitious character from Mark Twain's 1881 novel The Prince and the Pauper. He was born the same day as Edward Tudor, the Prince of Wales in 1537 and grew up in a life of poverty with his abusive, alcoholic father and grandmother. His mother and his sisters always tried to protect him. He wasn't well educated but learned Latin from Father Andrew, a local priest. One day, while taking a stroll, he meets Edward. They exchange clothes with one another, and then due to a mistake, it is assumed that Tom is the Prince of Wales, not Edward. When King Henry VIII died, Edward was to be crowned King, but Tom is nearly crowned King of England instead. Fortunately this did not happen, and Tom is saved.

At the last moment, Edward comes in and proves that he is the rightful King by knowing where the Great Seal of England was, having hidden it just after they had switched clothes.

Edward is crowned King Edward VI, and names Tom his royal ward. The end of the book mentions that Tom was appointed a royal librarian and lived to be a very old man, whereas Edward tragically died at the age of 15. A common misconception is that Edward was not happy with Tom at the end.

In film adaptations, Tom and Edward are often played by the same actor (such as Mahesh Kothare in Raja Aur Runk (1968), Mark Lester in the 1977 film) or a pair of twins (such as Dylan Sprouse and Cole Sprouse in A Modern Twain Story: The Prince and the Pauper, 2007). Often the actors are teenagers, even though the historical Edward was only 9 years old when he became king.
