= The Prince and the Pauper =

1882 novel by Mark Twain

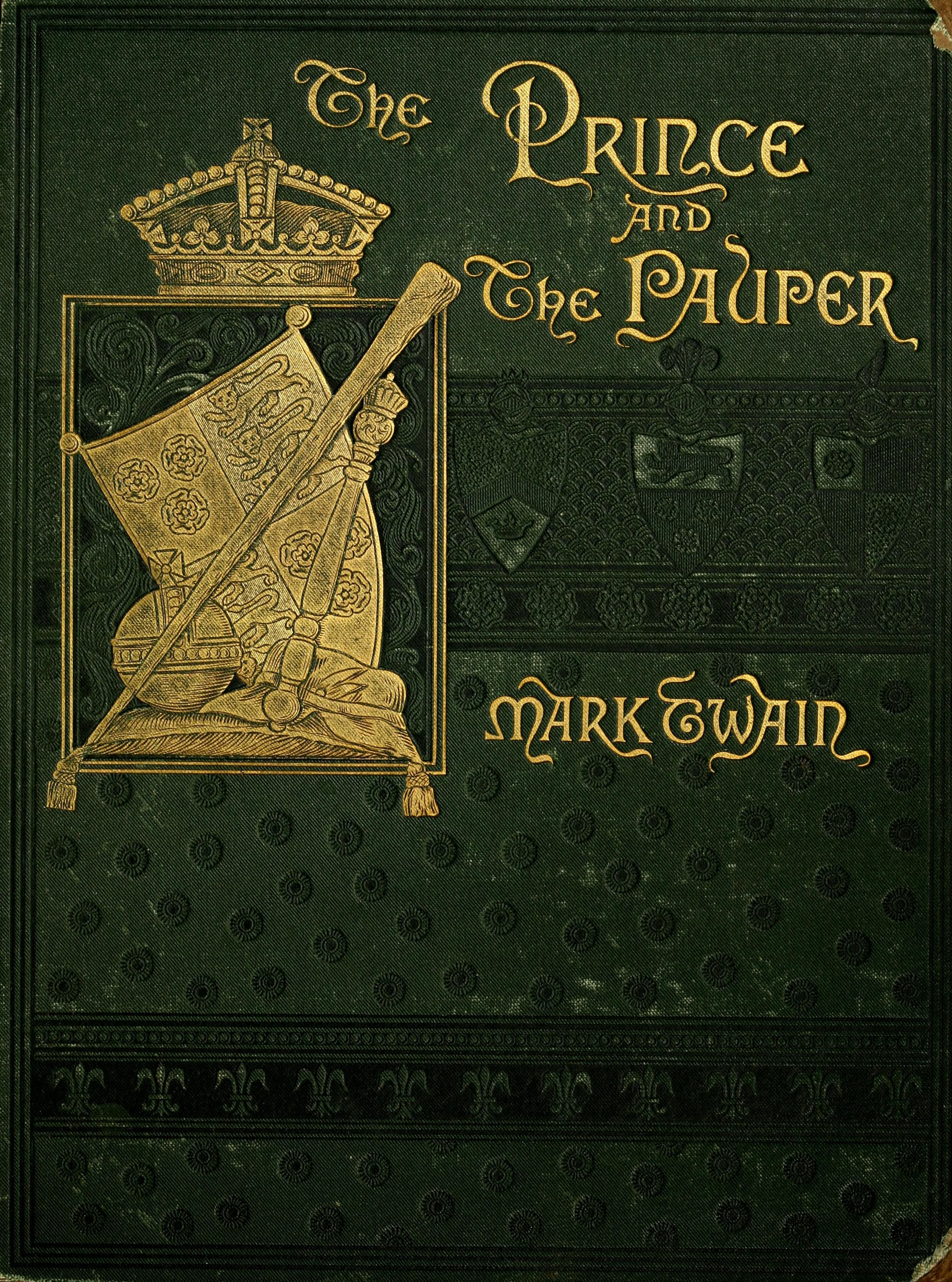
- First U.S. edition
- Author: Mark Twain
- Language: English
- Subject: Edward VI
- Genre: Realistic fiction Children's literature
- Publisher: James R. Osgood & Co.
- Publication date: 1881 (Canada), 1882 (U.S.)
- Publication place: United States
- Pages: 401
- Text: The Prince and the Pauper at Wikisource

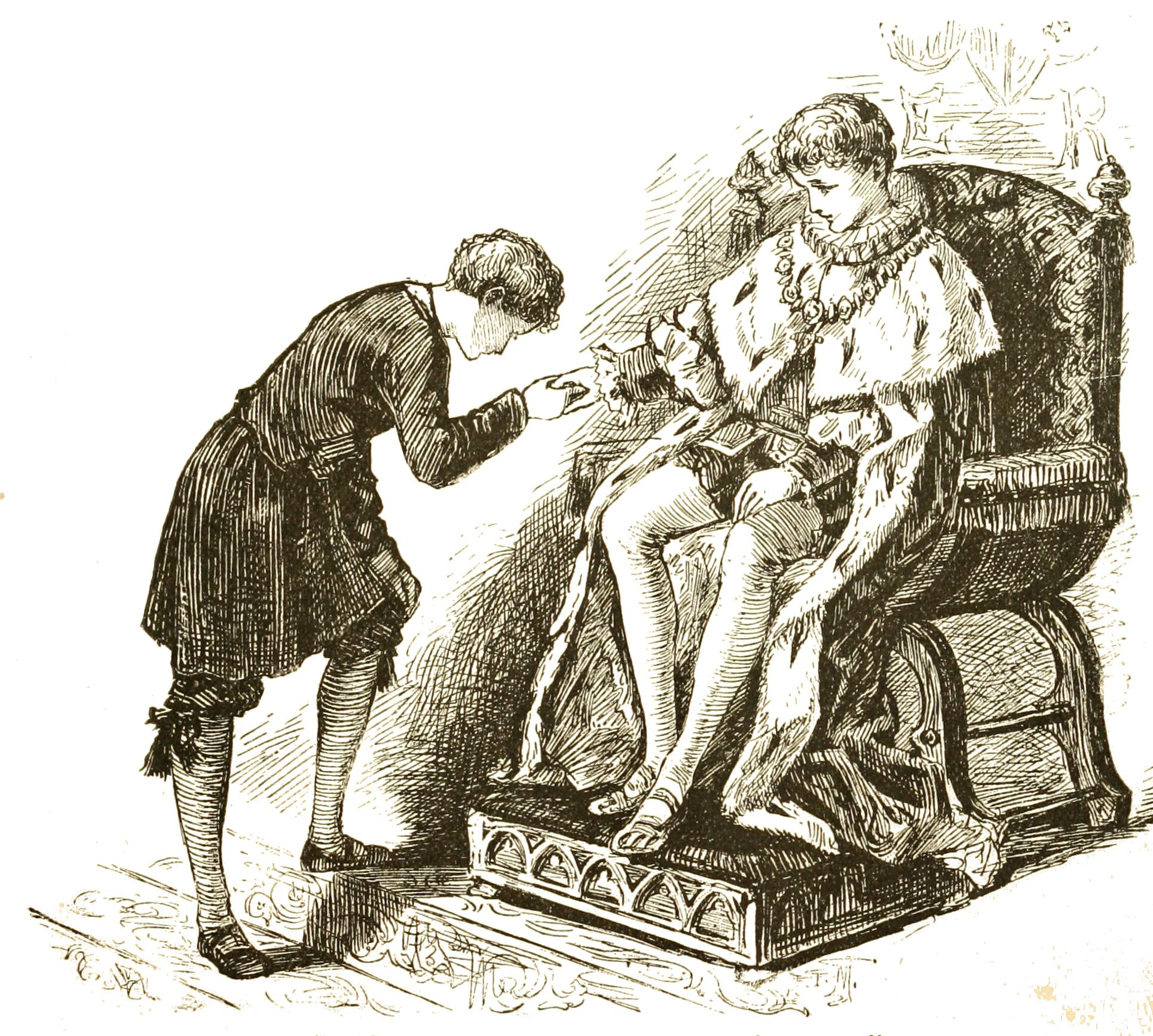
The pauper and Prince Edward as imagined in 1882.

The Prince and the Pauper is a novel by American author Mark Twain. It was first published in 1881 in Canada, before its 1882 publication in the United States. The novel represents Twain's first attempt at historical fiction. The plot concerns the accession of nine-year-old Edward VI to the throne of England in 1547 and his interactions with look-alike Tom Canty, a London pauper who lives with his abusive, alcoholic father.

== Plot ==
Tom Canty, the youngest child of a family of low means living in Offal Court, located in London, England, has been abused by his father and his grandmother but is encouraged by the local priest, who taught him to read and write. Loitering around the Palace of Westminster gates one day, Tom sees Edward Tudor, the Prince of Wales. Coming too close in his intense excitement, he is caught and nearly beaten by the royal guards. However, Edward stops them and invites Tom into his palace chamber. There, the two boys get to know one another and are fascinated by each other's lives. They have an uncanny resemblance to each other and learn they were even born on the same day, so they decide to swap clothes "temporarily". Edward hides an item, which the reader later learns is the Great Seal of England, and goes outside to confront the guards who abused Tom; however, dressed as Tom, he is not recognized by the guards, who drive him from the palace.

Tom, dressed as Edward, tries to cope with court customs and manners after being mistaken for the prince. Edward's father, King Henry VIII, his fellow nobles, and the palace staff think the prince has an illness that has caused memory loss and fear he will go mad. After King Henry dies, Tom is repeatedly asked about the missing Great Seal of England, but he knows nothing about it. However, when Tom is asked to sit in on judgments, his common-sense observations reassure them that his mind is sound.

Edward eventually finds his way through the streets to the Canty home, where the Canty family believes him to be Tom. There, he is subjected to the brutality of Tom's alcoholic father, from whom he manages to escape, and meets Miles Hendon, a soldier and nobleman returning from war. Although Miles does not believe Edward's claims to royalty, he humors him and becomes his protector. Meanwhile, they receive news that King Henry has died and Edward has become king.

As Edward experiences the brutal life of a London pauper firsthand, he becomes aware of the stark class inequality in England. In particular, he sees the harsh, punitive nature of the English judicial system, under which people are burned at the stake, pilloried, and flogged. He realizes that the accused are convicted on flimsy evidence and branded or hanged for petty offenses, and he vows to reign with mercy when he regains his rightful place. When Edward declares to a gang of thieves that he is the king and will put an end to unjust laws, they assume he is insane and hold a mock coronation.

After a series of adventures, including a stint in prison, Edward interrupts the coronation as Tom is about to be crowned king. The nobles are shocked at their resemblance but refuse to believe that Edward is the rightful king wearing Tom's clothes until he produces the Great Seal of England that he hid before leaving the palace. Edward and Tom switch back to their original places, and Edward is crowned King Edward VI of England. Miles is rewarded with the rank of Earl and the family right to sit in the king's presence. In gratitude for supporting the new king's claim to the throne, Edward names Tom the "King's Ward", a privileged position he holds for the rest of his life. The novel ends stating that Tom lived a long life, while Edward died at the age of 15.

== Themes ==
The introductory quote—"The quality of mercy is . . . twice blest; / It blesseth him that gives and him that takes: / 'Tis mightiest in the mightiest: it becomes / The throned monarch better than his crown"—is part of the "quality of mercy" speech from William Shakespeare's The Merchant of Venice.

While written for children, The Prince and the Pauper is both a critique of social inequality and a criticism of judging others by their appearance. Twain wrote of the book, "My idea is to afford a realizing sense of the exceeding severity of the laws of that day by inflicting some of their penalties upon the King himself and allowing him a chance to see the rest of them applied to others..."

== History ==
Having returned from a second European tour, which formed the basis of A Tramp Abroad (1880), Twain read extensively about English and French history. Initially intended as a play, the book was originally set in Victorian England before Twain decided to set it further back in time. He wrote The Prince and the Pauper having already started Adventures of Huckleberry Finn.

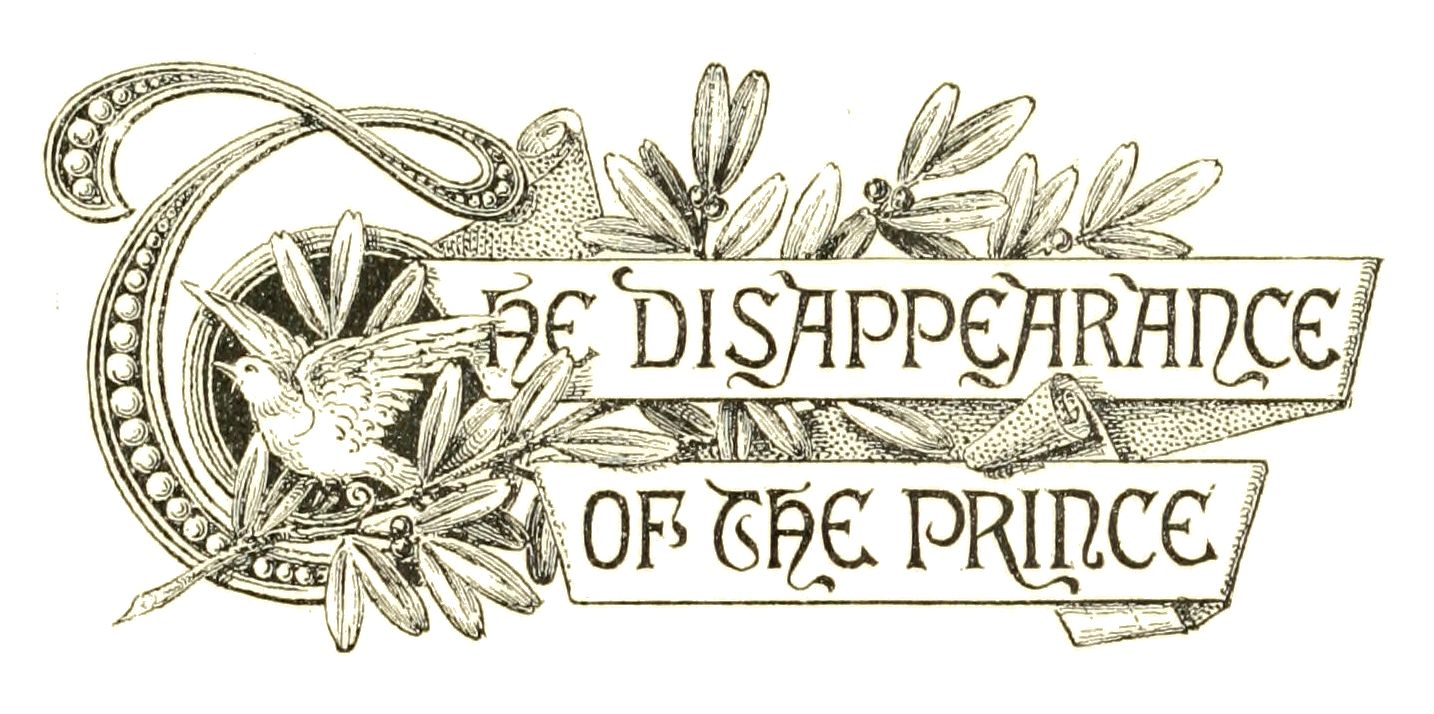
Chapter head by Ludvig Sandöe Ipsen

The "whipping-boy story", originally meant as a chapter to be part of The Prince and the Pauper, was published in the Hartford Bazar Budget of July 4, 1880, before Twain deleted it from the novel at the suggestion of William Dean Howells.

Ultimately, The Prince and the Pauper was published by subscription by James R. Osgood of Boston, with illustrations by Frank Thayer Merrill, John Harley and Ludvig Sandöe Ipsen.

The book bears a dedication to Twain's daughters, Susie and Clara Clemens, and is subtitled "A Tale For Young People of All Ages".

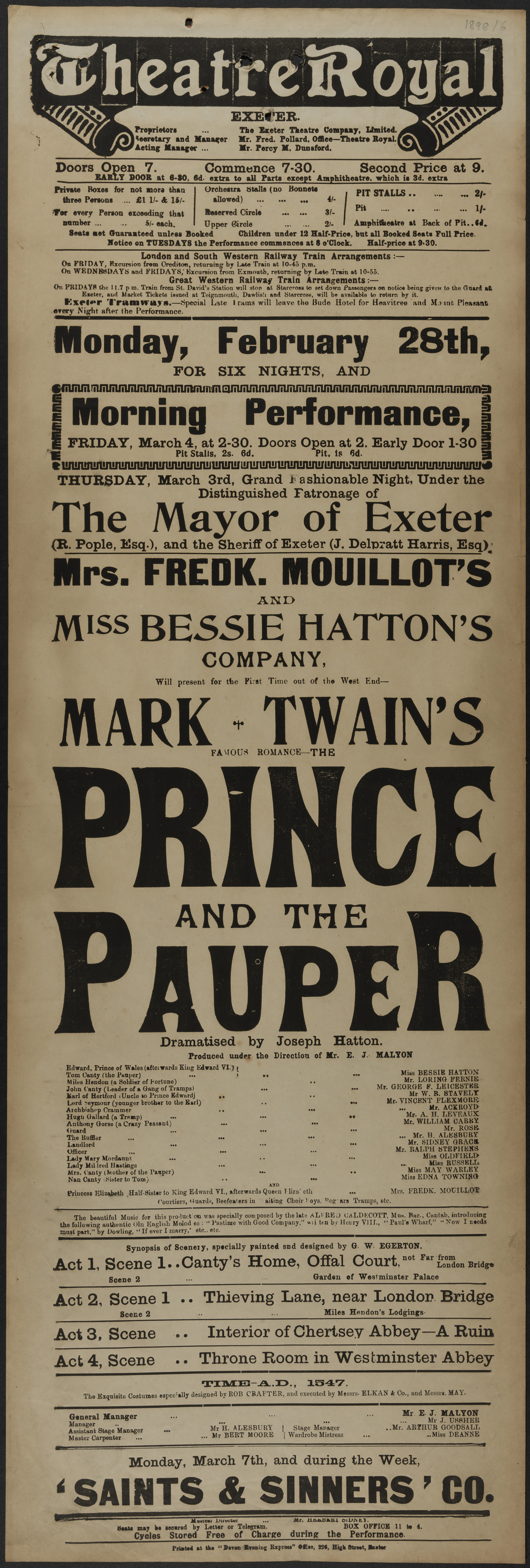
Playbill for a performance of The Prince and the Pauper at the Theatre Royal in Exeter on 28 February 1898

== Adaptations ==
=== Theater ===
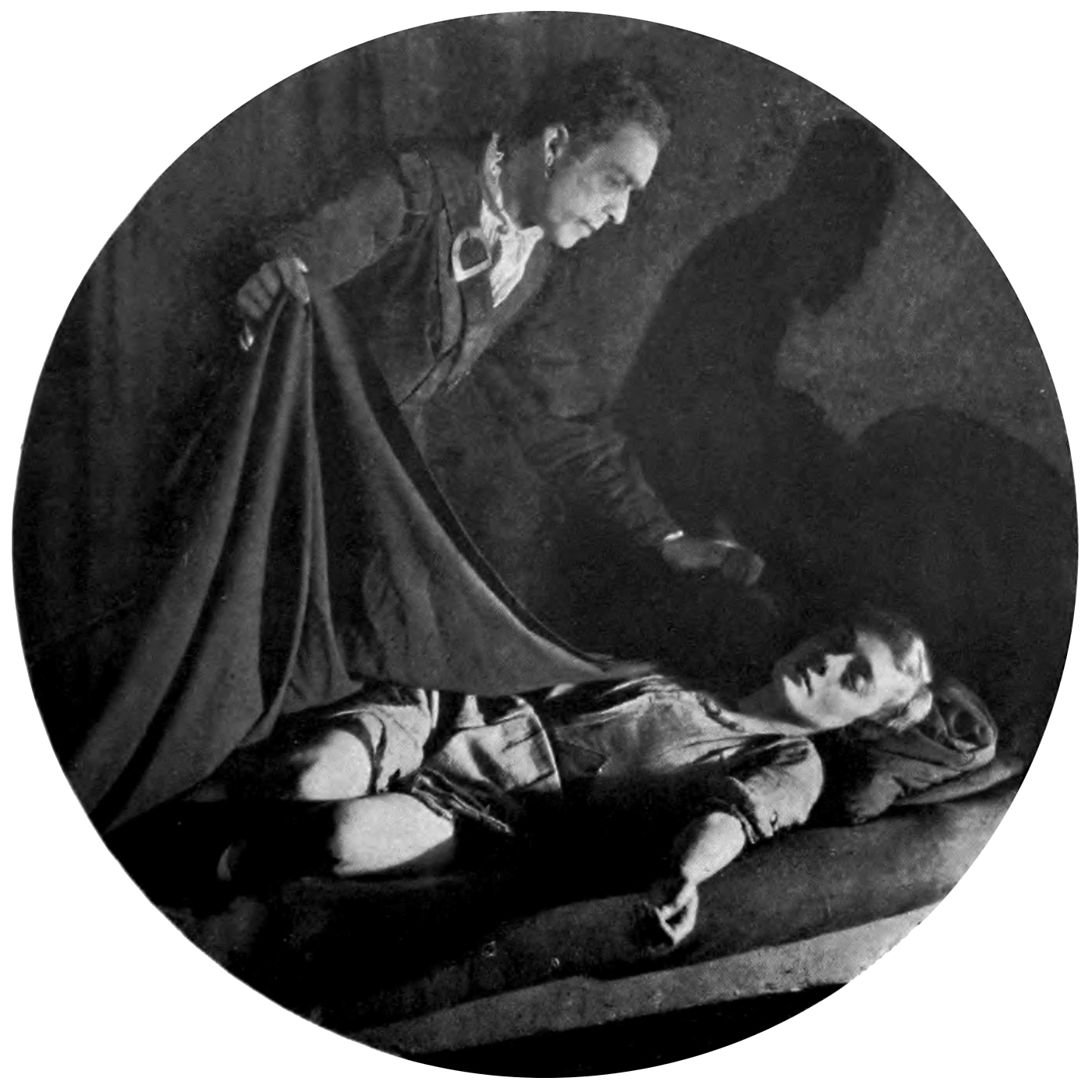
William Faversham and Ruth Findlay in the Broadway production of Amélie Rives' adaptation of The Prince and the Pauper (1920)

The Prince and the Pauper was adapted for the stage during Twain's lifetime by Abby Sage Richardson, an adaptation that involved Twain in litigation with another attempted adapter, Edward Howard House. In November 1920, a stage adaption by Amélie Rives opened on Broadway under the direction of William Faversham, with Faversham as Miles Hendon and Ruth Findlay playing both Tom Canty and Prince Edward.

A studio-cast musical adaptation with book/lyrics by Verna Tomasson and music by George Fischoff was recorded in 1963 on London Records (AM 98001/AMS 98001), with Joan Shepard as Tom Canty, Carol Blodgett as Prince Edward, John Davidson as Miles Hendon, Flora Elkins as Lady Anne, Joe Bousard as John Canty and Robert McHaffey. Another version of this musical was recorded on Pickwick Records (SPC-3204) with the misleading cover blurb stating that it was the "Original Soundtrack from the New Movie".

An Off-Broadway musical with music by Neil Berg opened at Lamb's Theatre on June 16, 2002. The original cast included Dennis Michael Hall as Prince Edward, Gerard Canonico as Tom Canty, Rob Evan as Miles Hendon, Stephen Zinnato as Hugh Hendon, Rita Harvey as Lady Edith, Michael McCormick as John Canty, Robert Anthony Jones as the Hermit/Dresser, Sally Wilfert as Mary Canty, Allison Fischer as Lady Jane and Aloysius Gigl as Father Andrew. The musical closed on August 31, 2003.

English playwright Jemma Kennedy adapted the story into a musical drama, which was performed at the Unicorn Theatre in London between 2012 and 2013, directed by Selina Cartmell, and starred twins Danielle and Nichole Bird as the Prince and the Pauper and Jake Harders as Miles Hendon.

A musical adaptation has been produced by the Shiki Theatre Company in Japan. In 2025, it was revived under the title "The Prince and the Boy", because the word used as a translation for "pauper", "kojiki", was considered insulting. It has music by Toshihiko Sahashi and Izumitaku, and lyrics by Yutaka Watanabe and Koji Ishizaka.

=== Comics ===
1946 Classic Comics cover

In 1946, the story was adapted into comics form by Arnold L. Hicks in Classics Illustrated ("Classic Comics") #29, published by Gilberton.

In 1962, Dell Comics published Walt Disney's The Prince and the Pauper, illustrated by Dan Spiegle, based on the three-part television adaptation produced by Walt Disney's Wonderful World of Color.

The British comic Nipper had a regular strip called Will and Bill that updated the concept to be about the young Prince William regularly swapping places with a working-class boy who looked identical to him.

In 1990, Disney Comics published Disney's The Prince and the Pauper, by Scott Saavedra and Sergio Asteriti, based on the animated featurette starring Mickey Mouse.

=== Film ===
The novel has also been the basis of several films. In some versions, Prince Edward carries identification when he assumes Tom's role. While animations such as the Mickey Mouse version retell the story, other cartoons employ parody (including an episode of the animated television show Johnny Bravo in which Twain appears, begging cartoonists to "let this tired story die"). Film critic Roger Ebert suggested that the 1983 comedy film Trading Places (starring Dan Aykroyd and Eddie Murphy) has similarities to Twain's tale due to the two characters' switching lives (although not by choice).

A much-abridged 1920 silent version was produced (as one of his first films) by Alexander Korda in Austria entitled Der Prinz und der Bettelknabe.

The 1937 version by Warner Bros. was its biggest hit for the year and starred Errol Flynn (as Hendon), Claude Rains, Alan Hale, and twins Billy and Bobby Mauch (as Tom Canty and Edward Tudor, respectively).

A 1977 film version of the story, starring Oliver Reed as Miles Hendon, Rex Harrison as the Duke of Norfolk, Mark Lester as Edward/Tom, Ernest Borgnine as John Canty, Charlton Heston as Henry VIII, and Raquel Welch and directed by Richard Fleischer, was released in the UK as The Prince and the Pauper and in the US as Crossed Swords.

In 1990, Walt Disney Feature Animation released an animated featurette inspired by the novel and starring Mickey Mouse. In this version, Mickey "plays" both of the title roles, with a cast of other Disney characters.

It Takes Two, starring twins Mary-Kate and Ashley Olsen, is another loose adaptation of this story, in which two look-alike girls, one the wealthy daughter of a wireless service tycoon and the other an orphan, switch places in order to experience each other's lives. Similarly, 2000's Model Behavior, which originally aired on ABC's The Wonderful World of Disney, stars Maggie Lawson as a teenage model and an ordinary high schooler who also decide to switch places.

A 2000 made-for-TV film directed by Giles Foster stars Aidan Quinn (as Miles Hendon), Alan Bates, Jonathan Hyde, and identical twins Jonathan and Robert Timmins.

In 2004, The Prince and the Pauper was adapted into an 85-minute animated musical, Barbie as the Princess and the Pauper, with Barbie playing the blonde Princess Anneliese and the brunette pauper Erika. In 2012, a second animated musical adaptation was released, titled Barbie: The Princess and the Popstar. In it, Barbie plays a blonde princess named Victoria (Tori) and a brunette pop star named Keira. Both crave the life of another; one day, they meet and magically change places.

Garfield's second live-action film, 2006's Garfield: A Tail of Two Kitties, is another adaptation of the classic story, although its title references Charles Dickens's A Tale of Two Cities.

A 2007 film, A Modern Twain Story: The Prince and the Pauper, stars identical twins Dylan and Cole Sprouse.

Another loose adaptation, Monte Carlo, was released in 2011 by 20th Century Fox and stars Selena Gomez.

A Telugu film version, Raju Peda, was released in 1954, starring N. T. Rama Rao and directed and produced, for Indian television, by B. A. Subba Rao and dubbed into Tamil as Aandi Petra Selvam in 1957. Later, a Hindi film version, Raja Aur Runk, was directed by Kotayya Pratyagatma and released in 1968. These films "Indianized" many of the episodes in the original story. A 1983 Kannada movie, Eradu Nakshatragalu, was also inspired by The Prince and the Pauper. The 1996 Bollywood film Tere Mere Sapne is loosely based upon this story, in which two boys born on exactly the same date switch places to experience the other's life while learning valuable lessons along the way. In 2020, another Telugu film version, Ala Vaikunthapurramuloo, was released, with the Hindi-language remake Shehzada released in 2023.

=== Television ===
A 1962 three-part Walt Disney's Wonderful World of Color television adaptation features Guy Williams as Miles Hendon. Both Prince Edward and Tom Canty are played by Sean Scully, using the split-screen technique that Disney had used in The Parent Trap (1961) with Hayley Mills.

The 21st episode of The Monkees, aired on February 6, 1967, is titled "The Prince and the Paupers".

The Josie and the Pussycats episode "Swap Plot Flop" has Valerie agreeing to pose as a kidnapped princess who looks just like her, only for the plan to backfire.

An episode of The Osmonds called "Jimmy and James in London" has Jimmy and Fuji switching places with their doppelgangers.

In 1971, Czech Television (then Czechoslovak Television) produced a 2-part made-for-TV film Princ a chuďas (The Prince and the Pauper), closely following the plot of Mark Twain's story. Directed by Ludvík Ráža, the film starred 16-year-old Roman Skamene in the titular double role.

In a 1976 ABC Afterschool Special, Lance Kerwin plays the dual role in a modern American-based adaptation of the story titled "P.J. and the President's Son".

The BBC produced a television adaptation by writer Richard Harris, consisting of six thirty-minute episodes, in 1976. Nicholas Lyndhurst plays both Prince Edward and Tom Canty.

Ringo, a 1978 TV special starring Ringo Starr, involves the former Beatles drummer trading places with a talentless look-alike.

The BBC TV comedy series Blackadder the Third has an episode, "Duel and Duality", in which the Prince Regent believes that Arthur Wellesley, 1st Duke of Wellington is after him. The prince swaps clothes with his butler Blackadder and says, "This reminds of that story 'The Prince and the Porpoise'." Blackadder corrects him: "and the Pauper," to which the prince replies, "Ah yes, the Prince and the Porpoise and the Pauper." Since Blackadder the Third is set before 1820, this is an anachronism.

In 1996, PBS aired a Wishbone adaptation titled "The Prince and the Pooch", with Wishbone playing both Tom Canty and Edward VI.

The BBC produced a six-part dramatization of the story in 1996, adapted by Julian Fellowes, starring James Purefoy, with Keith Michell reprising his role of Henry VIII. This series was nominated for a British Academy Children's Award.

A 2011 episode of Phineas and Ferb ("Make Play", season 2, episode 64) follows a similar storyline, with Candace switching places with Princess Baldegunde of Drusselstein and discovering that royal life is dull.

Switched at Birth is an American teen and family drama television series that premiered on ABC Family on June 6, 2011.

Starting with the episode "The Shepherd" (which premiered on December 4, 2011), the TV series Once Upon a Time introduces a version of the story where a shepherd named David is the Pauper and Prince James is the Prince.

In 2017 Hallmark Channel released the movie Switched at Christmas, starring Candace Cameron Bure playing both twin sisters Kate Lockhart and Chris Dixon who swap after comparing their lives.

The 2017 Japanese anime series Princess Principal uses a similar story as the background for the characters Ange and Princess Charlotte; their history is revealed by Ange under the guise of a fairy tale named "The Princess and the Pickpocket". Ten years prior to the start of the series, Ange, who was actually the real Princess Charlotte, met Princess, who was actually a common pickpocket named Ange and looked identical to her. They befriended one another and eventually decided to trade places for a day. Soon after the switch, however, a Revolution broke out and divided their country, separating the girls and leaving them trapped in each other's roles.

In The Princess Switch (a Netflix romantic Christmas film released in November 2018 starring Vanessa Hudgens), Margaret, the Duchess of Montenaro, changes places with baker Stacy, whom she accidentally meets. That plot results in 2 new love stories. This film is the first installment in the Princess Switch trilogy. It was followed by a sequel, The Princess Switch: Switched Again, which premiered on November 19, 2020, and the threequel, The Princess Switch 3: Romancing the Star, which premiered on November 18, 2021. The series is produced by Netflix and released exclusively through its streaming services as Netflix Original Films.

Sister Swap is a 2021 American series of TV films starring sisters Kimberly Williams-Paisley and Ashley Williams. The films were originally broadcast on Hallmark Channel, as part of the channel's "Countdown to Christmas" seasonal programming.

=== Video games ===
In 1996, C&E, a Taiwanese software company, released an RPG video game for Sega Genesis entitled 新乞丐王子/Xīn qǐgài wángzǐ ("New Beggar Prince"). Its story was inspired by the book, with the addition of fantastic elements such as magic, monsters, and other RPG themes. The game was ported to PC in 1998. It was eventually licensed in an English translation and released in 2006 as Beggar Prince by independent game publisher Super Fighter Team. This was one of the first new games for the discontinued Sega platform since 1998 and is perhaps the first video game adaptation of the book.

== See also ==
- Cultural depictions of Edward VI
- William Featherstone, a man who claimed to be Edward VI after the latter's death
- The Vicomte of Bragelonne: Ten Years Later (1850), the third volume of Alexandre Dumas' Musketeers series, featuring a "royal doppelgänger" subplot based on the Man in the Iron Mask legend.
- The Prisoner of Zenda (1894), the first volume of Anthony Hope's Ruritania series, also involving a royal substitution with a double. It has been parodied almost as frequently as The Prince and the Pauper.
