= Billy and Bobby Mauch =

American twin child actors

Billy Mauch
- Born: William John Mauch; July 6, 1921; Peoria, Illinois, U.S.
- Died: September 29, 2006 (aged 85); Palatine, Illinois, U.S.
- Occupation: Actor
- Years active: 1936–1951
- Spouse: Marjorie Barnewolt (m. 1953)
- Children: William J. Mauch II

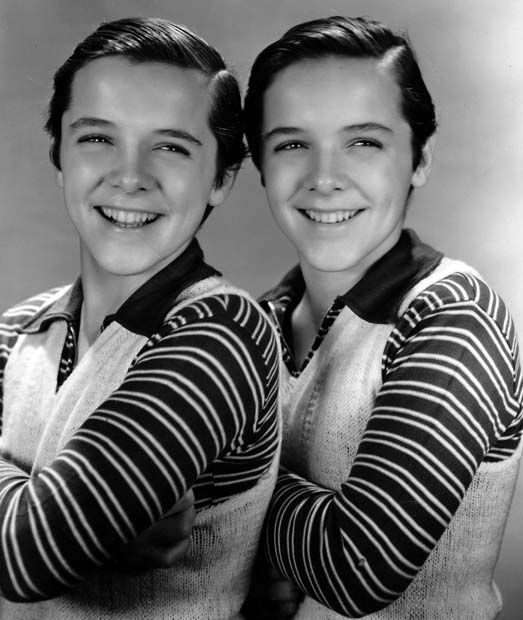
Billy (left) and Bobby (right)

Bobby Mauch
- Born: Robert Joseph Mauch; July 6, 1921; Peoria, Illinois, U.S.
- Died: October 15, 2007 (aged 86); Santa Rosa, California, U.S.
- Occupation: Actor
- Years active: 1937–1943
- Spouse: Georgia "Gigi" Shattuck Culhane (m. 1971)

William John Mauch (July 6, 1921 – September 29, 2006) and his identical twin brother, Robert Joseph Mauch (July 6, 1921 – October 15, 2007), were child actors in the 1930s. They had starring roles in the 1937 film The Prince and the Pauper, based on the 1881 novel of the same name by Mark Twain.

== Early lives ==
Billy and Bobby were born in Peoria, Illinois, to Felix, an employee of the Toledo, Peoria and Western Railway and Marguerite Mauch, née Burley. Billy was older than Bobby by ten minutes. They began singing and acting in radio at the age of seven and later appeared in print advertisements before signing a contract with Warner Bros.

== Careers ==
After moving with their mother to Hollywood in 1935, Billy was cast as the young title character in the film Anthony Adverse because he resembled Fredric March, who was to play Adverse as an adult. His brother Bobby was his stand-in for the role, but the brothers, whose voice and appearance were almost indistinguishable, later claimed that they had freely alternated who would play the part in the takes. They were cast as lookalikes in The Prince and the Pauper (1937), in which they co-starred with Errol Flynn and Claude Rains, and were each paid $350 per week. The picture earned them the cover story in the May 3, 1937 issue of Time.

The twins went on to appear together in three films based on the Penrod stories by Booth Tarkington, but Bobby ended his acting career shortly afterwards.

Billy and Bobby both attended Loyola High School in Los Angeles before graduating from the Mar-Ken School for professional children, in Hollywood. During their senior year, they ran jointly for the office of class president under the campaign slogan "Two Heads Are Better than One."

In 1943 the brothers appeared in the Broadway play Winged Victory, then saw actual military service together in World War II, stationed in the Pacific.

After the war, Billy continued to play minor roles in films, the last of which was the comedy Bedtime for Bonzo (1951), which famously starred Ronald Reagan and a chimpanzee.

Interested in the technical aspects of movie-making, both brothers eventually found employment in that field. Bobby became a film editor whose work included the 1950s television series Dragnet. In 1950 Billy became a sound editor for Warner Brothers and went on to work on more than 300 films and television shows. He created the sound effects for the car chase in Bullitt and the giant ants in Them!.

== Personal lives ==
Billy and his wife Marjorie, who were married 53 years, had one son, William J. Mauch II. Billy died, aged 85, in his home in Palatine, Illinois.

Bobby Mauch married professional figure skater Georgia "Gigi" Shattuck (March 30, 1924 — January 15, 2019), whom he first met at the Mar-Ken School in the 1940s, but married in 1971. They had no children together, but she had children from a prior marriage. He died, aged 86, at a nursing home in Santa Rosa, California.
