= The Prince and the Pauper (1977 film) =

1977 film by Richard Fleischer

- UK theatrical release poster
- Directed by: Richard Fleischer
- Written by: Berta Dominguez D. & Pierre Spengler (original screenplay); George MacDonald Fraser (final screenplay)
- Based on: The Prince and the Pauper; 1881 novel by Mark Twain
- Produced by: Pierre Spengler
- Starring: Oliver Reed; Raquel Welch; Mark Lester; Ernest Borgnine; George C. Scott; Rex Harrison; David Hemmings; Harry Andrews; Murray Melvin; Sybil Danning; Felicity Dean; Lalla Ward; Julian Orchard; Charlton Heston
- Cinematography: Jack Cardiff
- Edited by: Ernest Walter
- Music by: Maurice Jarre
- Production companies: International Film Production; Prince and the Pauper Film Export A.G.
- Distributed by: Warner Bros. (United States and Canada); 20th Century-Fox (international)
- Release date: June 3, 1977 (London)
- Running time: 113 minutes
- Country: United Kingdom
- Language: English
- Budget: $7-8 million

The Prince and the Pauper is a 1977 British action-adventure film directed by Richard Fleischer, based on the 1881 novel The Prince and the Pauper by Mark Twain. It stars Oliver Reed, Ernest Borgnine, Raquel Welch, George C. Scott, Charlton Heston, Sir Rex Harrison, and Mark Lester, playing the dual role of Edward VI of England and Tom Canty. The film was released in the US as Crossed Swords.

== Plot ==
In 16th-century London, a pauper called Tom Canty reading to a group of children is attacked by his cruel father. John Canty threatens to beat Tom unless he steals five shillings by suppertime. Tom goes into the city square and steals a purse from a rich man, but drops it after bumping into another man. Thinking that Tom still has the purse, the victim and others chase Tom through the streets of London.

Tom escapes by climbing up a wall and through a window, where he falls into a palace garden in front of King Henry VIII, who sets the guards on him. However, Tom outruns them by going to the roof of the castle and hiding in a chimney. In the grounds, Henry VIII gives orders for Thomas Howard, the Duke of Norfolk to be arrested during the masked ball that evening.

In his royal chamber, Edward, Prince of Wales, refuses to wear a costume to the masked ball and his attendants leave him. Tom falls down the chimney into the chamber, and Edward demands to know who he is. Tom introduces himself and explains his situation. Intrigued by Tom's resemblance to him, Edward decides they should swap appearances and clothes to attend the masked ball, adding that the Prince's Seal stays with the true Prince.

Mistaking Edward for Tom, the Duke of Norfolk orders that he be escorted out of the palace. Outside, Edward is rescued by skilled swordsman Sir Miles Hendon. At the masked ball, the Duke of Norfolk is arrested, and the king and the guests laugh at Tom's dancing. Tom repeatedly insists that he is not the Prince of Wales.

Meanwhile, Edward repeatedly insists that he is the Prince of Wales. Miles says he believes him, but in fact he does not. He takes the boy to John Canty, and Edward discovers what Tom's life is like. When John attempts to beat Edward, Miles intervenes, and in the resulting fight John pushes Miles off a roof into a stream. John is declared a murderer, and he flees London with Edward.

At the castle, King Henry has been ill since the morning after the masked ball, and he orders that no one is to declare that Tom is not the Prince, not even Tom himself. Although some of the royal household are suspicious of the sudden change of demeanour of the "Prince" (even going as far as mentioning the possibility that he could be an imposter), they dismiss it as a mere phase. During a banquet, Henry VIII dies in his royal chamber. Tom commands that The Duke of Norfolk shall not be executed.

In a forest, some unfriendly men escort John and Edward to a cavern where Ruffler's gang hides out. Word has reached them of Henry VIII's death. Edward is inspired by the men's hardships and vows to restore their honour. After winning a fight with one of the gang members, Edward leaves. John goes after him to beat him again, but is killed by another of Ruffler's men.

Outside, Edward meets Miles, who survived his fall. Miles takes Edward to Hendon Hall. Miles is outraged to discover that his brother, Hugh Hendon, has married Miles' sweetheart, Lady Edith and taken Hendon Hall for himself. Hugh has Miles and Edward captured, but Edith helps them escape. Edward convinces Miles that he really is the rightful King and offers to restore him to his honour as a Knight.

The day of the coronation arrives, and Edward and Miles race to London after waylaying a horse and cart that Hugh and Edith are in. Miles swaps clothes with Hugh and ties him up in the cart, but Hugh breaks out in London and attempts to have Miles arrested. Miles and Edward fight off the guards and Edward gets inside Westminster Abbey before the doors are closed. Edward halts the ceremony, and he and Tom change back to their original positions, admitting to each other that they were not good at playing each other's roles. Archbishop Thomas Cranmer and other witnesses are stunned until Edward produces the Prince's Seal and takes his position as the rightful King.

After the ceremony, Edward makes Tom Governor of Christ's Hospital and Tom's mother sets up shelters for the homeless. Miles' brother Hugh agrees to a divorce from Edith and enjoys a political career in America. Miles is restored to his honour as a Knight and marries Edith (although their marriage isn't the "happily ever after" kind). The Duke of Norfolk has his enemies put to death, and Princess Elizabeth later becomes Queen, keeping her promise to take "good care of England".

== Cast ==
- Oliver Reed as Sir Miles Hendon
- Raquel Welch as Lady Edith
- Mark Lester as Edward VI/Tom Canty
- Charlton Heston as King Henry VIII
- Ernest Borgnine as John Canty
- George C. Scott as The Ruffler
- Rex Harrison as Thomas Howard, 3rd Duke of Norfolk
- David Hemmings as Hugh Hendon
- Harry Andrews as Edward Seymour, 1st Duke of Somerset
- Julian Orchard as Oliver St John, 1st Baron St John of Bletso
- Murray Melvin as Prince's Dresser
- Lalla Ward as Princess Elizabeth
- Felicity Dean as Lady Jane Grey
- Sybil Danning as Mother Canty
- Graham Stark as The King's Jester
- Preston Lockwood as Father Andrew
- Arthur Hewlett as Fat Man
- Tommy Wright as Constable
- Harry Fowler as Nipper
- Richard Hurndall as Archbishop Thomas Cranmer
- Don Henderson as Burly Ruffian
- Dudley Sutton as Hodge
- Ruth Madoc as Moll

== Production ==
The film was in limbo during the development. Berta Dominguez (the wife of Alexander Salkind) and Pierre Spengler wrote a script based on the Mark Twain novel The Prince and the Pauper for Alexander and Ilya Salkind in 1968. A key change in the adaptation was changing the ages of Prince Edward and Tom Canty from nine in the novel to sixteen. George Cukor was to direct but he wanted to go back to the original novel and cast an actor to play nine-year-old boys – Mark Lester. The Salkinds wanted to cast someone older, having Leonard Whiting in mind for the parts. The Salkinds lost enthusiasm for the project and instead went on to make The Light at the End of the World.

The Salkinds had a big success with The Three Musketeers (1973) which re-activated their interest in The Prince and the Pauper. They originally intended to follow up Musketeers with The Prince Malange starring Oliver Reed and Peter O'Toole. Then O'Toole became unavailable and filming was threatened with sets already half-built. In addition, the Salkinds needed money while developing Superman. The Salkinds decided to use the old script for The Prince and the Pauper and use existing sets and commitments.

Richard Fleischer was approached to direct. He agreed provided he could have a new script and a bigger budget – $7 million. The Salkinds agreed. George MacDonald Fraser was hired to rewrite the script.

Shooting took place in England and Hungary. Filming started on 17 May 1976 at Penshurst Place, Kent. Filming took place there for two weeks before moving to Pinewood Studios. Most filming in Hungary took place in Sopron and Budapest.

== Release ==
The film was released on 3 June 1977 in London and on 29 July 1977 in Ireland by 20th Century Fox. It was released on 2 March 1978 in New York City, on 15 March 1978 at the USA Film Festival and on 17 March 1978 in United States by Warner Bros. Pictures.

== Reception ==
The film generally performed poorly at the box office. However, in New York, it was the last film planned to be shown at Radio City Music Hall when it was threatened with closure in April 1978 and the film attracted large crowds who wanted to visit the cinema before it closed. The film set a house record in Easter 1978 grossing $468,173 in the week ending 29 March. In the sixth and final week, tickets were selling between $5 and $25 to benefit the Variety Club of New York.

== See also ==
- Cultural depictions of Henry VIII

== Sources ==
- Petrou, David; Dominguez, Bertha (1978). The Making of Crossed Swords. Ace Books.
