= Raphael Winter =

German painter, engraver and lithographer (1784–1852)

- Goat and three shorn sheep next to a stone wall, Amsterdam, Rijksmuseum
- Born: 1784; Munich, Electorate of Bavaria
- Died: 1852 (aged 67–68); Munich, Kingdom of Bavaria
- Education: Johann Michael Mettenleiter
- Known for: Painting; Engraving
- Movement: Neoclassicism
- Father: Joseph Georg Winter

Raphael Winter (also spelled Rafael Wintter; 1784 – 1852) was a German painter, watercolourist, engraver and lithographer based in Munich.

== Life ==
Raphael Winter was born in Munich in 1784. His younger brother was the painter Heinrich Eduard Winter. His father, Joseph Georg Winter, an engraver specialising in court and hunting scenes, died when he was still young, but was able to provide Raphael with his initial art instruction. His mother later married the engraver and lithographer Johann Michael Mettenleiter, who continued Raphael's training. In 1809, Raphael was hired by the royal lithographic institute in Munich, which was managed by Mettenleiter, and he spent his entire professional career there.

== Works ==
Like his father, Winter specialised in depictions of animals and hunting scenes. In 1814, he published a portfolio of etchings titled Verschiedene Thiere nach Natur gezeichnet und radiert ("Various Animals, Drawn from Nature and Etched"). Due to his position at the royal lithographic institute, he could only pursue his own artistic work in his spare time. Nevertheless, he travelled to Italy twice to further his studies and founded a lithographic business in Rome. In 1831, he released a series of etchings featuring animal studies created during his time in Italy. Winter was one of the founding members of the Kunstverein München.

== Gallery ==
Cat, Leiden University Library

Horse's Head, Leiden University Library

Cow standing on a Coast, 1813, Amsterdam, Rijksmuseum

Leopard, 1813, Amsterdam, Rijksmuseum

== Bibliography ==
- Nagler, Georg Kaspar (1851). "Winter (Wintter), Joseph Georg". Neues allgemeines Künstler-Lexicon oder Nachrichten aus dem Leben und den Werken der Maler, Bildhauer, Baumeister, Kupferstecher, Formschneider, Lithographen, Zeichner, Medailleure, Elfenbeinarbeiter, etc. Vol. 21. Munich: E.A. Fleischmann. pp. 544–45.
- Hermann Arthur Lier (1898). "Winter, Raphael" . Allgemeine Deutsche Biographie (in German). Vol. 43. Leipzig: Duncker & Humblot. p. 474.
- "Winter, Raphael or Wintter". Benezit Dictionary of Artists. Oxford: Oxford University Press. 2011. doi:10.1093/benz/9780199773787.article.B00197991.
