= Roman Vespers =

The Roman Vespers was a popular revolt against French Revolutionary troops and Jacobinism. It broke out on 25 February 1798 in the Roman Republic, a satellite state of the French First Republic.

== Course ==
Its trigger was Pope Pius VI's arrest and exile and the fall of the Papal States. The French seized the territory using general Mathurin-Léonard Duphot's murder by a Papal soldier on 28 December 1797 as a pretext. They then forced the entire population to wear a tricolour cockade in place of crucifixes, aiming to eradicate religion and local tradition rather than to create a new secularised society by force. They increased taxes, replaced all Christian symbols in the city with Jacobin ones, and replaced the Gregorian calendar with the French Revolutionary Calendar.

When some civic guards went to ask the residents to remove a cross they had placed on their cockades to distinguish themselves from the Jews, who were also considered strong supporters of the Republic, a riot that could already be felt in the air began: a crowd of commoners from Trastevere and Monti rioted and the civic guards were thrown into the river. The riot was put down by the French army.
