= The Magic Flute Part Two =

Libretto by Goethe

The Magic Flute Part Two (German: Der Zauberflöte zweyter Theil) is a fragmentary closet libretto by Johann Wolfgang von Goethe, which is inspired by Mozart's The Magic Flute. Parts were published in 1802 by Friedrich Wilmans, but its final form was published by Goethe in 1807.

== Development history ==
In 1795, four years after the premiere of The Magic Flute, Goethe began to plan a sequel to Mozart's opera. Originally Goethe had envisaged his Magic Flute II for a great success on stage. But his working process was consistently interrupted, thus the development was protracted. Besides Goethe already stated worries about finding the right composer in 1795. Another negative factor was that Emanuel Schikaneder, the librettist of Mozart's The Magic Flute, published his own sequel in cooperation with the composer Peter Winter. Goethe's The Magic Flute Part Two was published for the first time by Friedrich Wilmans in 1802. The subtitle Draft of a Dramatic Fairy Tale shows its stage play character. In 1807 Goethe published the Magic Flute II as a fragmentary closet play. It differs from the earlier version with a longer plot and an apotheosis as ending. However, the main story is not completed. Notes and drafts of Goethe give insights in his previous plans and reveal opportunities for a much longer plot; but any reconstruction would be very speculative.

Literary criticism suggests that Goethe continued symbols and other ideas of his Magic Flute II in other works, especially his Faust. The mixture between opera and closet play is used in Faust II at central points. Thomas Mann even described Goethe's Magic Flute as a "small Faust ... where the Homunculus and the son are still one in the luminescent box".

== Plot ==
Scenes 1–2
Monostatos reports to the Queen of the Night on an unsuccessful plan of revenge: As Pamina and Tamino were expecting a child, the Queen of the Night sent out Monostatos to kidnap the child immediately after delivery. But Monostatos only managed to put the child inside a magical coffin as he was interrupted by a strong magical power. Afraid of this power and Sarastro's approach, Monostatos decided to flee, but he took a moment to seal the coffin by the Queen's magic. Thus, the son of Pamina and Tamino should be sealed for all eternity. The second part of the curse is now announced by a Greek-style chorus.
Scenes 3–4
Then the scene shifts to the realm of the sun, where a group of ladies, according to the directions of Sarastro's wise men, keeps the coffin in motion to preserve the child from death.
Scene 5
Papagena and Papageno live in the countryside. But neither a golden waterfall nor the magic flute (Tamino's gift to their wedding) and glockenspiel, that enables roasted birds to fly directly into the mouth, can distract them from their sadness over not having children. A hidden chorus advises them to carry on, but to enjoy calm. Papagena and Papageno follow the advice.
Scenes 6–7
In the temple of Sarastro's priesthood the priests have gathered to welcome a brother, who was on pilgrimage for one year. According to the rules of the priesthood now they have to choose a new pilgrim from among the priests by lot. The lot falls to Sarastro.
Scene 8
According to an omen, Pamina wants to dedicate the coffin to the sun. Her entourage sets the coffin on an altar. After a prayer the earth starts shaking. The altar sinks together with the coffin into the earth. Pamina desperately stays behind.
Scenes 9-11
Papagena and Papageno find big and beautiful eggs in their home. Sarastro appears and helps with magical power whereby three children hatch out of the eggs. Then Sarastro informs them about the misery of Pamina and Tamino. After the disappearing of the coffin Pamina visited Tamino. In the moment they saw each other they fall into a periodic sleep from which they only awoke for a short time just to yield to despair. In this way they are cursed up to now. Sarastro calls Papageno and his family to visit the royal court. The jolly family and in particular the magic flute should help against the misery. Sarastro stays lonely behind and then climbs a mountain.
Scenes 12–13
Papageno and his family arrive at the royal court, where a group of courtiers welcomes them. Papageno spreads a good mood, but also jokes about the values of court society.
Scenes 14–15
Papageno visits the cursed couple and eases their misery by playing the magic flute. Priests appear, who herald the location of coffin and call the parents up to rescue their son.
Scenes 16–19
The coffin is in an underground vault surrounded by two guardians each of them has a spear and a lion on a chain. In this darkness, only lighted up by the coffin, the guardians have a mysterious dialogue about the mystery of life and the human straying between light and darkness, between mania and mania.

Pamina and Tamino enter the vault and shortly afterwards the Queen of the Night appears to call the guardians up to defend the coffin. The guardians start threatening gestures, but the parents and especially Pamina invoke the mother love. In this way the guardians are appeased and the Queen of the Night is forced to flee. Now Pamina and Tamino step closer to the coffin and the child hears the voices of its parents. Finally the coffin opens and the child rises up as a brightly illuminated genius, who also illuminates the heads of all others.

== Context and interpretation ==
=== Epochal threshold ===
Already Mozart's The Magic Flute apparently makes references to the moods of its time, that was influenced by the Enlightenment and a revolutionary spirit. It stands to reason that the Queen of the Night as monarch represents the old values of the Dark Ages, where the church and nobility possessed an undisputed supremacy; besides Sarastro and his brotherhood of the sun realm represent the Enlightenment and a civil order. But neither the system of the Queen is completely condemned, nor Sarastro's civil brotherhood is uncritical glorified. So the night realm produces the jolly bon vivant Papageno, while the sun realm creates the tortured soul Monostatos. Similar to the play also in reality old and new values tend to claim absoluteness, but are not absolutely right or wrong; like the civil leadership of the French Revolution turned into The Terror. Goethe could meant such value conflicts by the dialogue of the two guardians as they talk about the human straying between light and darkness, between mania and mania. Furthermore, Goethe's Magic Flute II shows numerous motifs of syntheses (like Papagena and Papageno have to use working and activity as well as enjoyment and calm to get children), that seems to suggest a use of both systems, instead of becoming absolutely obsessed by one.

=== Freemasonry and the mysteries of Isis ===
Both Mozart and Goethe were Freemasons. The last words of The Magic Flute are dedicated to the three ideals of Freemasonry (wisdom, strength and beauty): "Strength has triumphed, rewarding / beauty and wisdom with an everlasting crown!" These words proclaim the victory of Sarastro's priests and it seems reasonable that Sarastro's order of initiated is based on a Freemason order. The Freemasons of that time were very interested in myths and especially in mystery cults of ancient times, where the initiation into the priesthood was related with a symbolic death experience. In this way, the passing through the darkness by not shunning night, death and other dreads is an important motif of The Magic Flute. Pamina's courage to face the death overcomes even the rules of the brotherhood and paves the way for her initiation in their male society: "A woman unafraid of darkness and death / is worthy and will be consecrated." Considering that the mysteries of Isis are a theme in The Magic Flute, then it is reasonable to recognize in the plot of the child in the golden coffin an allegory to Isis' son, the sun god Horus. Like the myth of Horus is based on the simple perception of the course of the sun, according to which the sun sinks into the ground in the evening and comes out of the ground in the morning, the child in the coffin is wandering on earth's surface, sinks into the underworld and finally raises oneself in the air. The final scene, where the luminescent genius is surrounded by two lions and flies up, reminds strikingly on pictorial representations of the sun god Horus at sunrise, who is also surrounded by two lions, the representation of the earth deity Aker.

== Preliminary draft of Faust and other works ==
In literary studies is stated that The Magic Flute II was the godfather of Goethe's very deepest symbols. Accordingly, numerous studies have discovered influences of The Magic Flute II in Goethe's other works and especially in his Faustian poetry, which is commonly considered to be the most important work in German literature.

=== Faust II: act 3 ===
Most frequently is studied the genius of The Magic Flute II in relation to Euphorion of Faust II. Euphorion, the son of Faust and Helen, only appears in the third act, also called the Helen-act, which Goethe discussed with Schiller as "peak ... of the whole". Some general themes of the Helen-act with references to The Magic Flute II are also accumulating in Euphorion.

==== Euphorion ====
In regard to the plot of the genius, the comparison to the sun god ("like a miniature Apollo", line 9620) and the sun's course (into the underworld and up again) is strikingly in this short passage about Euphorion:

But suddenly he's vanished in a crevice of the cavern,
And it seems he's lost.
His mother grieves for him, father comforts,
I stand there, wondering anxiously, but there again's the vision!
Do buried treasures lie there? Robes embroidered all with flowers,
He has fittingly assumed.
Tassels tremble from his shoulders, ribbons flutter round his chest,
In his hand a golden lyre, like a miniature Apollo,
He steps happily to the overhanging brink: amazing.
And the parents in delight clasp each other to their hearts,
What's that shining round his temples? It's hard to see what's gleaming,
Is it gold and gems, or flames, now, of the spirit's supreme power? (lines 9613/4–9624)

==== Further related aspects ====
- Opera

Goethe talking about the operatic part in the Helen-act: "The first part ... requires the first tragic artists, and the operatic part must be sustained by the first vocalists, male and female. That of Helena ought to be played, not by one, but by two great female artists; for we seldom find that a fine vocalist has sufficient talent as a tragic actress." – Conversations with Goethe by Johann Peter Eckermann, January 25, 1827 (translated by John Oxenford)

- Initiate of ancient mysteries and Freemasonry

Goethe talking about hidden aspects of initiation in the Helen-act: "Let the crowd of spectators take pleasure in the spectacle; the higher import will not escape the initiated, as has been the case with the 'Magic Flute', and other things beside." – Conversations with Goethe by Johann Peter Eckermann, January 25, 1827 (translated by John Oxenford)
As an explanation to read the Helen-act, Goethe refers to the Eleusinian Mysteries in a letter to Carl Jakob Iken: "Eleusis servat, quod ostendat revisentibus." – Goethe's letter to Iken, September 27, 1827

- Synthesis of two opposing value systems

As an explanation to read the Helen-act, Goethe refers to the big dispute between artists of classicissm and artists of romanticism in a letter to Iken: "I never doubted that the readers for whom I effectively wrote would grasp the principal significance of the portrayal straight away. It is time that the impassioned dispute between classicists and romantics should finally be reconciled. ... Is it not from this high level that we can learn to appreciate everything in its true physical and aesthetic value, both what is oldest and what is newest?" – Goethe's letter to Iken, September 27, 1827, (translation of Rüdiger Bubner)
