= Johann Jacob Mettenleiter =

German artist and painter (1750–1825)

- Engraved portrait of Johann Jacob Mettenleiter by Heinrich Eduard Winter, 1784, Bavarian State Library
- Born: 9 August 1750; Heidenheim an der Brenz
- Died: 25 February 1825 (aged 74); Gatchina
- Education: Johann Georg Zink
- Known for: Painting; Engraving
- Movement: Neoclassicism

Johann Jacob Mettenleiter (9 August 1750, Heidenheim an der Brenz – 25 February 1825, Gatchina) was a German-born painter and engraver who spent most of his career in Russia. He became a noted Academician at the Imperial Academy of Arts.

== Biography ==
His father was a watchmaker and his mother taught school. His first art lessons were provided by Johann Georg Zink, a painter from Neresheim. The frescos by Martin Knoller, in the nearby Neresheim Abbey, would have a major influence on his style. He then went to Schwäbisch Gmünd for further training.

He travelled throughout Germany, then settled in Amsterdam in 1773. There, he was recruited as a soldier for the Dutch Cape Colony In Cape Town he was able to make enough money selling his art to buy his way out of service and return to Europe. In 1775, he and his younger brother, Johann Michael, travelled to Italy and Vienna.

In 1786, he went to Saint Petersburg, where he would live for the rest of his life. Later that same year, he was named an Academician as a specialist in cabinet painting, Flemish style. In 1790, then Grand Duke Paul and his wife Maria commissioned him to paint views of Pavlovsk and Gatchina.

In addition to his canvases, he painted the altarpiece at the Church of St. Catherine on Nevsky Prospect, (not preserved) and several ceiling paintings for Saint Michael's Castle (in the Throne Room and the Raphael Gallery). Later, he took part in the decoration of the Raphael Loggias in the Hermitage. He is also known for his church paintings at the Monrepos estate in Vyborg, the home of Baron Ludwig Heinrich von Nicolay.

He lived in the kitchen wing of the Grand Palace. A story is told that, immediately following the assassination of Emperor Paul I, it was Mettenleiter who painted a portrait of his disfigured face. He died there in 1825, and was interred in the cemetery at St.Peter's Church, which has not been preserved.

Despite his popularity at the time, modern Russian critics have often been unkind. The art historian, Nikolay Lanceray. dismissed his work as being mediocre in color and design.

== Selected paintings ==
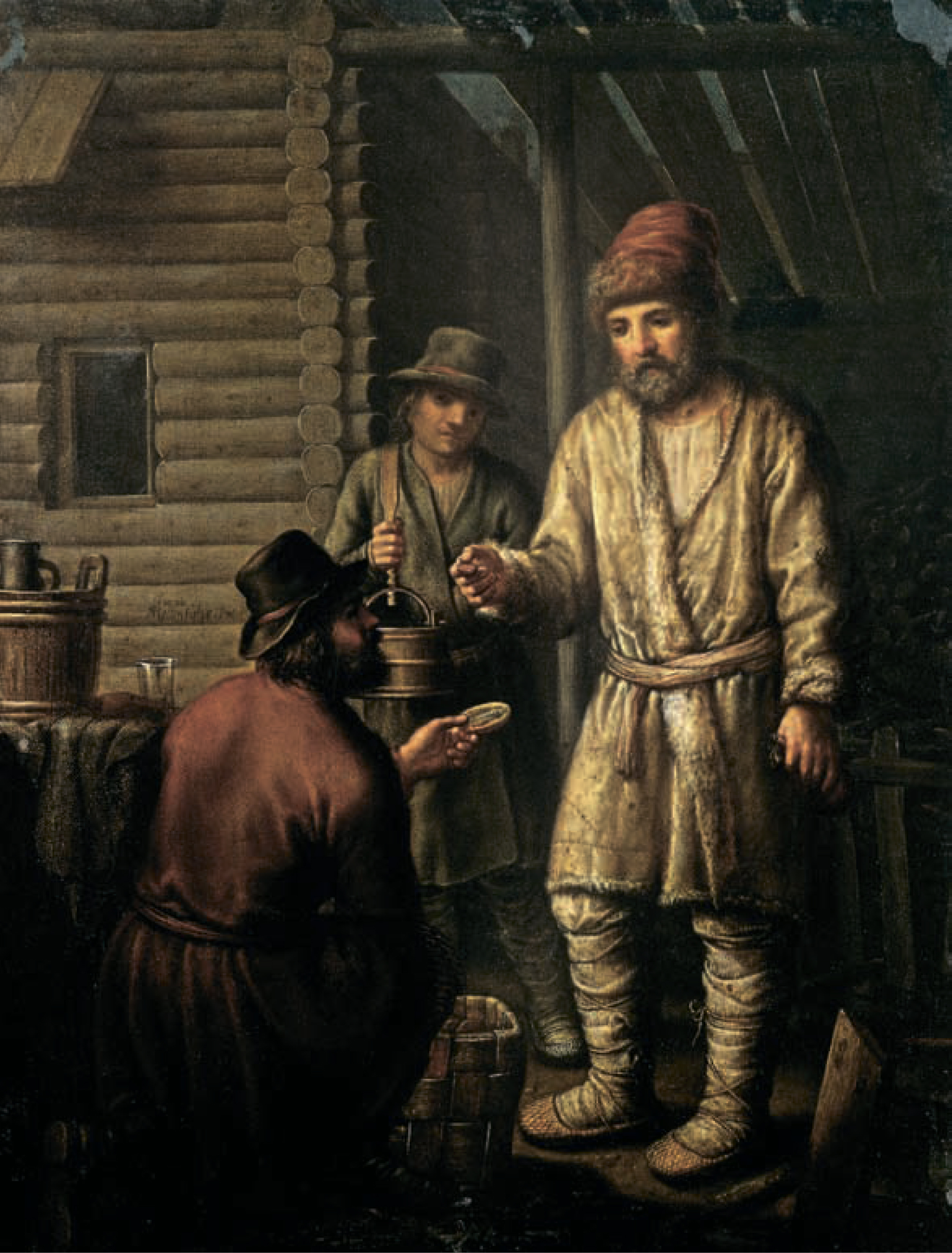
Peasants and pie-seller

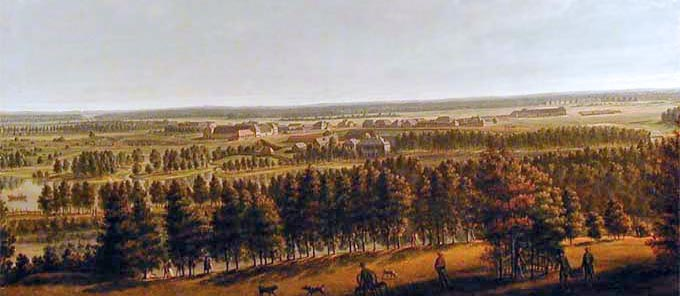
View of Gatchina Manor from the Signal Tower of Gatchina Palace

The Lovers, oil on copper, Bowes Museum

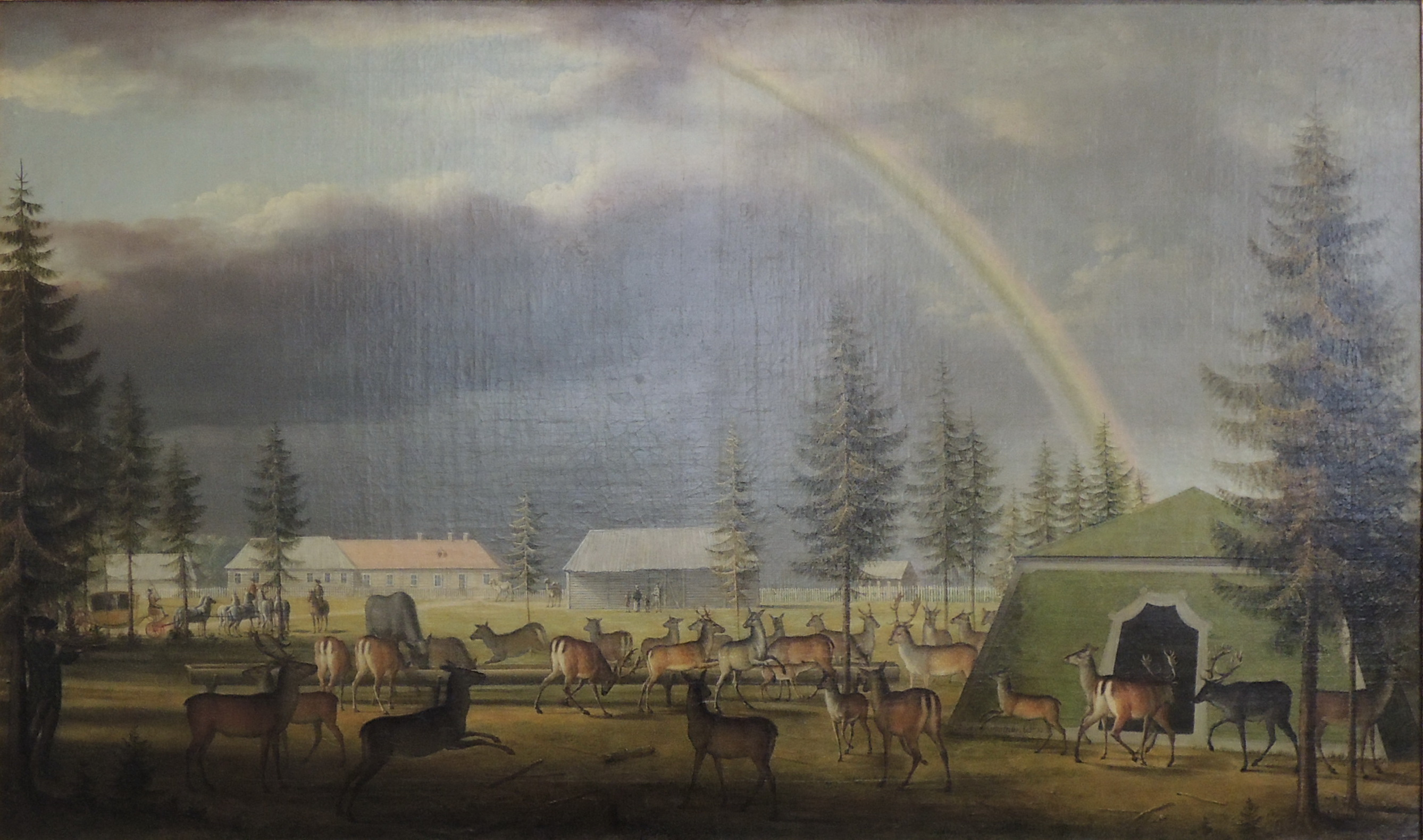
Menagerie in Gatchina

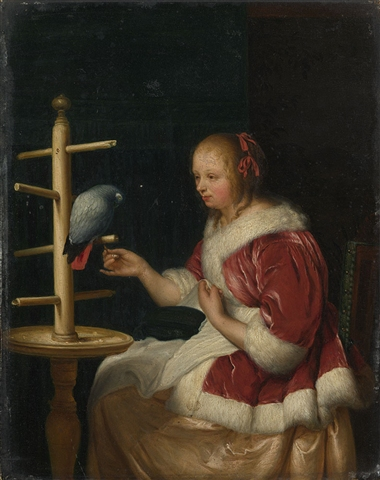
Girl With a Bird
