= Monrepos Park =

Large park in Vyborg, southern Karelia

Coordinates: 60°44′10″N 028°42′45″E

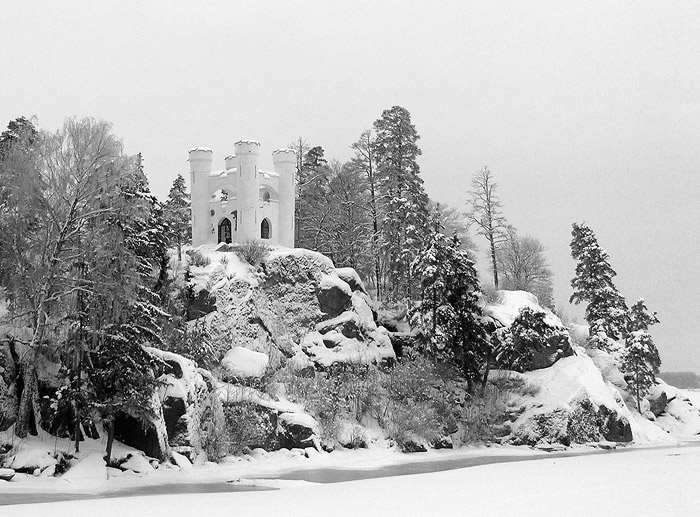
The Island of the Dead (Ludwigstein) contains Ludwigsburg, the mausoleum of Baron Ludwig Heinrich von Nicolay

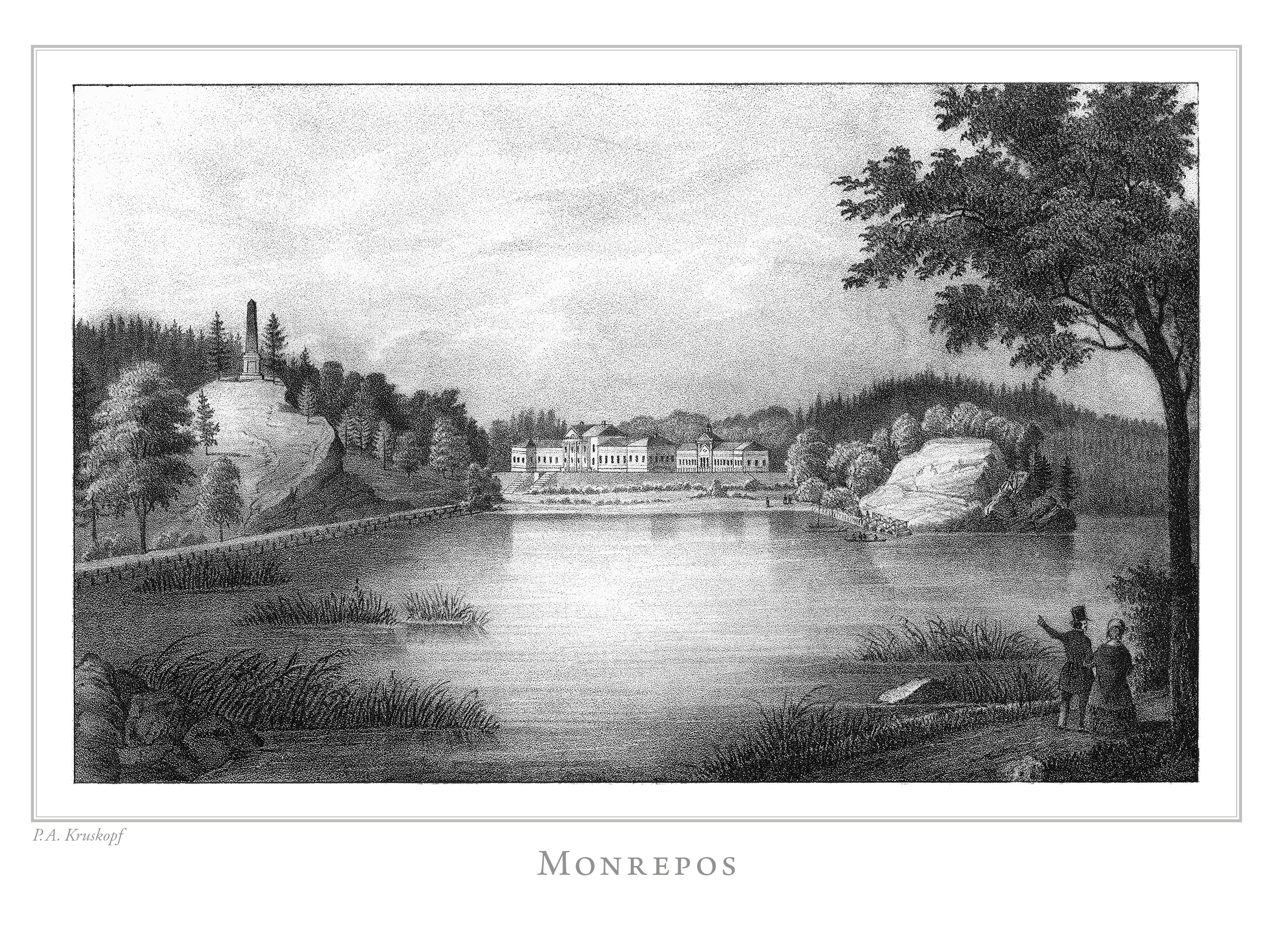
Illustration in Finland framstäldt i teckningar edited by Zacharias Topelius and published 1845-1852.

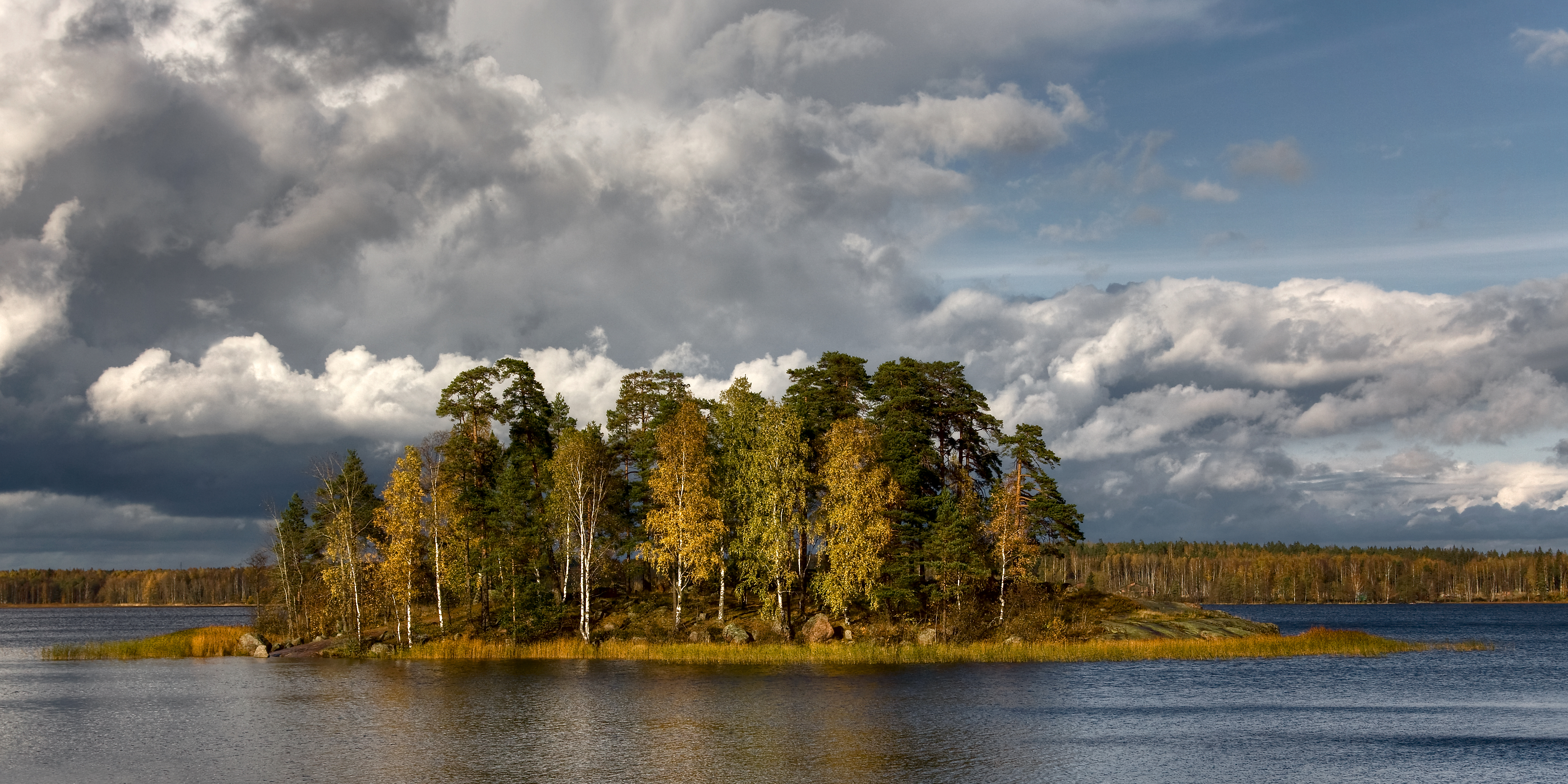
One of many islands in the bay

Mon Repos or Monrepos (Russian: Монрепо́, from the French for "my rest") is an extensive English landscape park in the northern part of the rocky island of Linnasaari (Tverdysh, Slottsholmen) outside Vyborg, Karelia. The park lies along the shoreline of the Zashchitnaya inlet of Vyborg Bay and occupies about 180 hectares (440 acres) of land.

The manor of Monrepos was established by Baron Ludwig Heinrich von Nicolay who bought this parcel of land in 1788. The estate was considered a jewel of Old Finland and belonged to his descendants until the Soviet takeover in 1944. The core of the baronial estate consists of the Neoclassical main house (designed by Giuseppe Antonio Martinelli) (today derelict) and the library house.

The seaside park is strewn with glacially deposited boulders, scenic cliffs and wooden pavilions. It is considered a landmark in the evolution of the Romantic taste for landscape gardening. The mausoleum of Baron Nicolay was designed by Pietro Gonzago and frescoed by Johann Jacob Mettenleiter.

Ludwig Heinrich's only son and successor, Baron Paul von Nicolay, was the Russian ambassador in Copenhagen from 1816 to 1847. His wife Alexandrine Simplicie de Broglie (the 2nd Duke's granddaughter) commissioned from Charles Heathcote Tatham an obelisk commemorating her brothers slain in the Napoleonic Wars. Auguste de Montferrand, Andreas Shtakenshneider and Gotthelf Borup also designed pavilions and statuary for Monrepos.

The park is noted for its rocks, mostly from the old Wiborgite granite (which is named after Vyborg), and for some glacial formations of up to 20 metres (66 ft) high. Some 50 species of plants can be found, some of them being rare. Its fauna is diverse as well.
