= Peter Winter =

German opera composer (1754–1825)

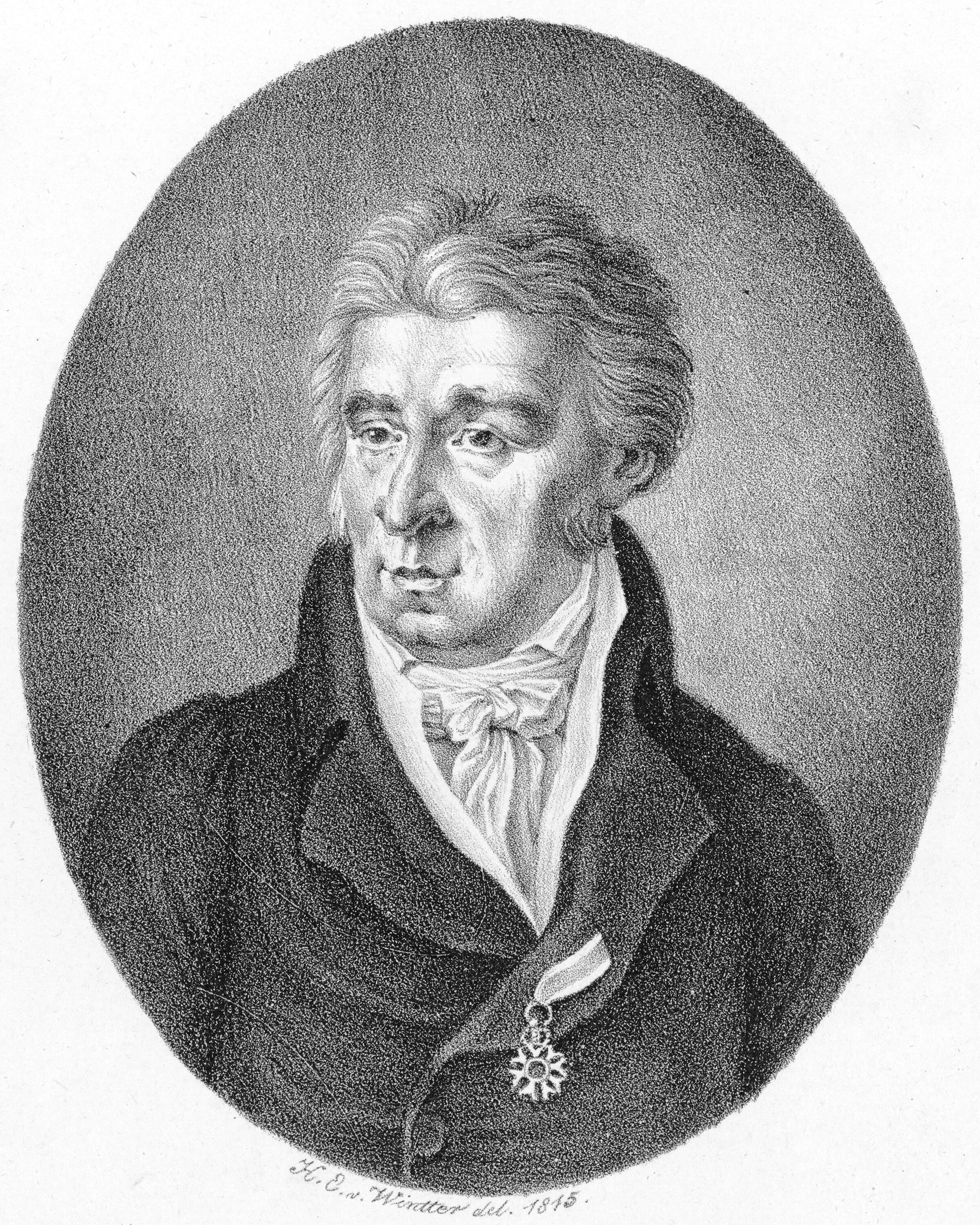
- Peter von Winter, portrayed by Heinrich Eduard Winter in 1815
- Born: Mannheim
- Baptised: 28 August 1754
- Died: 17 October 1825 (aged 71); Munich, Kingdom of Bavaria
- Other name: Peter von Winter
- Occupations: Violinist; Conductor; Composer; Voice teacher
- Organizations: Mannheim court orchestra; Munich court opera

Peter Winter, later Peter von Winter, (baptised 28 August 1754 – 17 October 1825) was a German violinist, conductor and composer, especially of operas. He began his career as a player at the Mannheim court, and advanced to conductor. When the court moved to Munich, he followed and later became kapellmeister of the opera there. His opera Das Labyrinth, a sequel to Mozart's Die Zauberflöte, was premiered in Vienna in 1798, and his Maometto at La Scala in Milan in 1817. His work has been regarded as a bridge between Mozart and Weber in the development of German opera.

== Career ==
Winter was born in Mannheim. He was a child prodigy on the violin, who occasionally played in the Mannheim court orchestra, from age ten, both violin and double bass. He studied violin in Mannheim with Wilhelm Cramer and Thaddäus Hampel, and later composition with Georg Joseph Vogler. Winter was engaged as a violinist in the orchestra from 1776. He also conducted from 1777. When the court moved to Munich in 1778, he became conductor of the orchestra, and met Mozart for the first time. He married Marianne Grosser that year, the daughter of a tailor. In 1781/82, Winter was sent to Vienna to study on a scholarship with Antonio Salieri, meeting Mozart again. He became director of the court theatre in Munich, at which point he started to write stage works, at first ballets and melodramas. He was promoted to vice kapellmeister in 1787 and to kapellmeister in 1798, holding the position for most of his life.

Winter composed more than thirty operas between 1778 and 1820, and only few were unsuccessful. His most popular work, Das unterbrochene Opferfest (The interrupted sacrificial feast), was produced in 1796 in Vienna, leading to his recognition as an opera composer. He composed two operas to librettos by Emanuel Schikaneder, Die Pyramiden von Babylon and Das Labyrinth, oder Der Kampf mit den Elementen, a sequel to Mozart's Die Zauberflöte which was premiered at the Theater auf der Wieden on 12 June 1798.

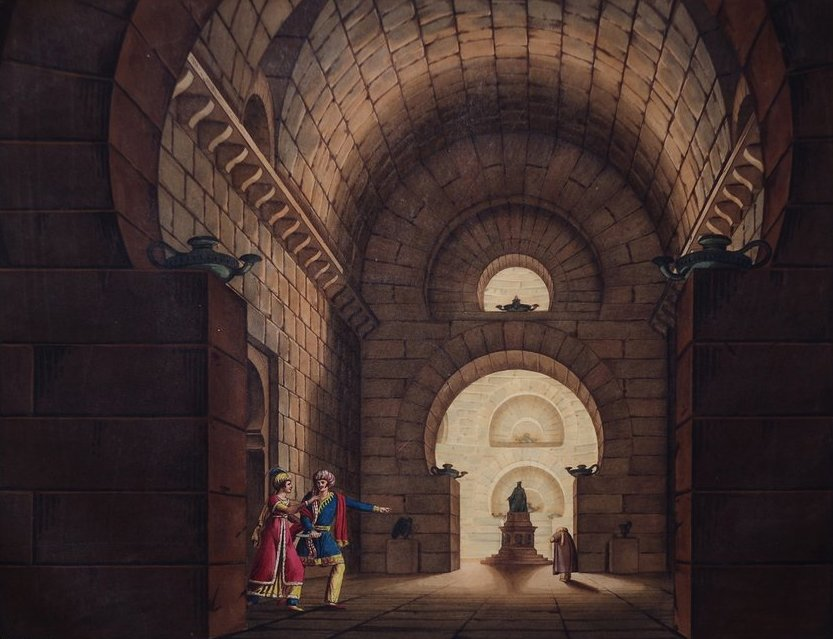
Scene from Maometto (act 2, scene 7), set design by Alessandro Sanquirico for the 1826 production at La Scala

Winter returned to Munich in 1798. Five years later he visited London, where he produced La grotta di Calipso in 1803, Il ratto di Proserpina in 1804 (both to librettos by Lorenzo Da Ponte), and Zaira in 1805, with great success. His Maometto, composed in 1817 and premiered at La Scala in Milan, is occasionally revived, and was recorded. His last opera, Der Sänger und der Schneider, was premiered in Munich in 1820. His operas were produced also in Berlin, Amsterdam, Paris and Moscow.

In 1811, he founded the Musikalische Akademie in Munich, an association which is remembered in the Akademiekonzerte of the Bavarian State Orchestra. Besides his works for the stage, he composed concertos for wind instruments and orchestra and, beginning in 1820, sacred music. He gave voice lessons and published a Vollständige Singschule (Complete school of singing) in 1825.

Winter was knighted on 23 March 1814. He died in Munich at age 71.

== Operas ==
- Lenardo und Blandine (1779)
- Der Bettelstudent (1785)
- Jery und Bäteli (1790)
- Catone in Utica (1791)
- Ogus o sia Il trionfo del bel sesso (1795)
- Das unterbrochene Opferfest (1796)
- Babylons Pyramiden (1797)
- Das Labyrinth oder Der Kampf mit den Elementen. Der Zauberflöte zweyter Theil, Heroic-comic opera, libretto by Emanuel Schikaneder. Theater auf der Wieden (1798)
- Tamerlan (1802)
- Maometto (1817)
