= Joseph Georg Winter =

German painter and engraver (1751–1789)

- Engraved portrait of Joseph Georg Winter
- Born: 30 May 1751; Munich, Electorate of Bavaria
- Died: 13 September 1789 (aged 38); Munich, Electorate of Bavaria
- Education: Johann Georg Winter
- Known for: Painting; Engraving
- Movement: Baroque
- Children: Heinrich Eduard Winter; Raphael Winter

Joseph Georg Winter (also spelled Wintter; 30 May 1751 – 13 September 1789) was a German painter, copperplate engraver and draftsman.

== Life ==
Joseph Georg Winter was born 30 May 1751 in Munich, the capital city of the Electorate of Bavaria. He received his first artistic training from his father, the electoral court painter Johann Georg Winter. In 1766, Joseph Georg became an apprentice at the tapestry manufactory in Munich, where he worked until 1783. His role involved creating preparatory designs for the tapestry weavers, with a particular focus on borders featuring foliage and figures. In 1784, he was appointed the Elector's court engraver specialising in hunting subjects. Two years later, in 1787, he became a court counsellor (Hofkammerrat), a high-ranking official in the electoral financial administration, as well as a member of the Kunstakademie Düsseldorf. Winter died in Munich on 13 September 1789. After his death, his widow married Johann Michael Mettenleiter, who went on to teach Winter's sons, Heinrich Eduard and Raphael.

== Works ==
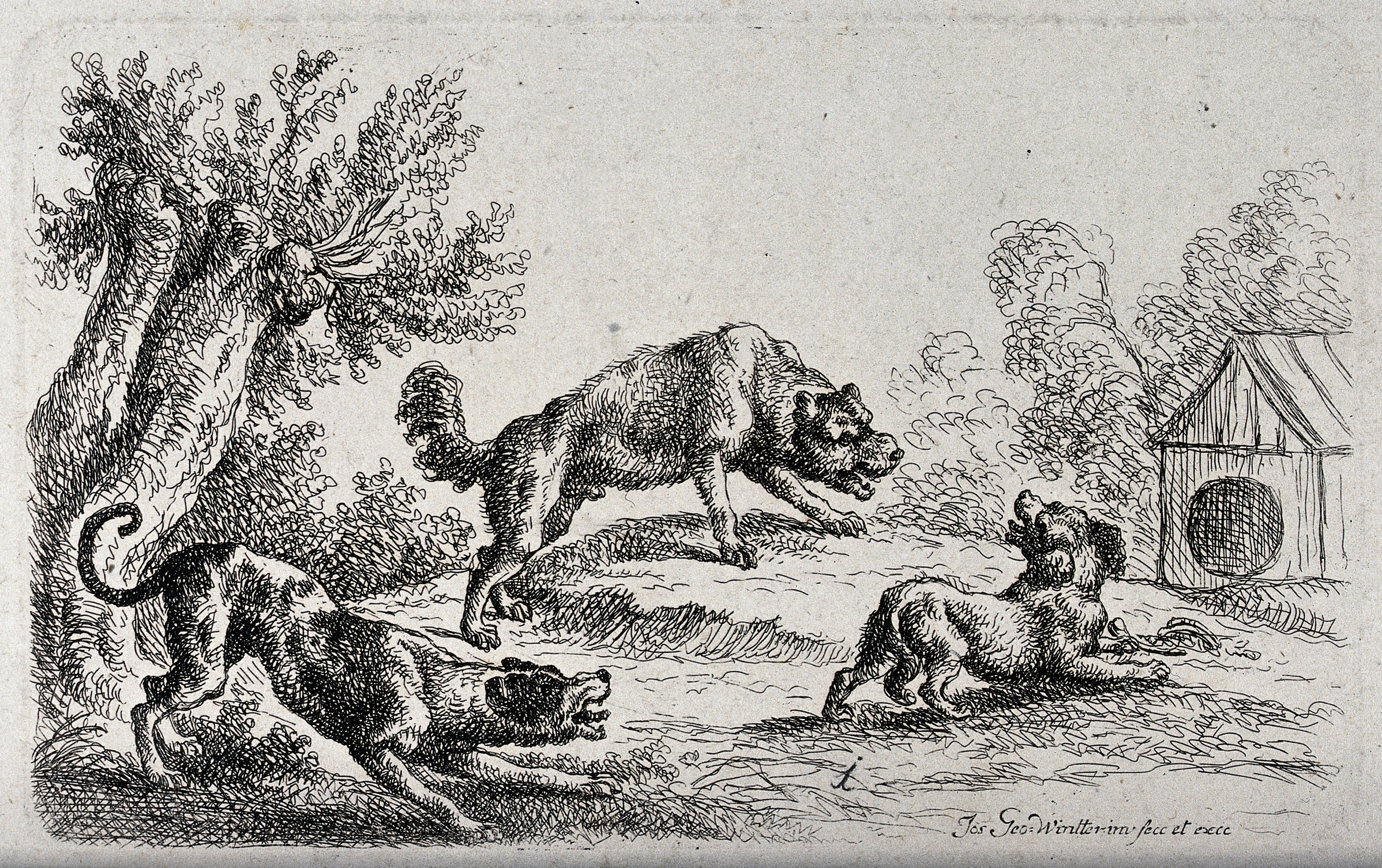
Two large dogs growling and barking at a small dog. Etching by Joseph Georg Winter

Alongside Johann Elias Ridinger, Winter is considered the most significant painter and printmaker of hunting subjects of his era. As well as producing reproductions of the work of Dutch painters, he specialised in series depicting hunting scenes and views of the electoral hunting grounds in Nymphenburg and Schleissheim. His works can be found in collections in Berlin, Düsseldorf and the Staatliche Graphische Sammlung in Munich.

== Bibliography ==
- Georg Kaspar Nagler: Winter (Wintter), Joseph Georg, in: Neues allgemeines Künstler-Lexicon oder Nachrichten aus dem Leben und den Werken der Maler, Bildhauer, Baumeister, Kupferstecher, Formschneider, Lithographen, Zeichner, Medailleure, Elfenbeinarbeiter, Vol. 21, Munich, E.A. Fleischmann, 1851, p. 542.
- DaCosta Kaufmann, Thomas (2004). Central European Drawings in the Collection of the Crocker Art Museum. Turnhout: Harvey Miller. ISBN 978-1872501246.
- "Winter, Joseph Georg or Wintter". Benezit Dictionary of Artists. Oxford: Oxford University Press. 2011. doi:10.1093/benz/9780199773787.article.B00197980.
