= Maometto (Winter) =

Opera by Peter von Winter

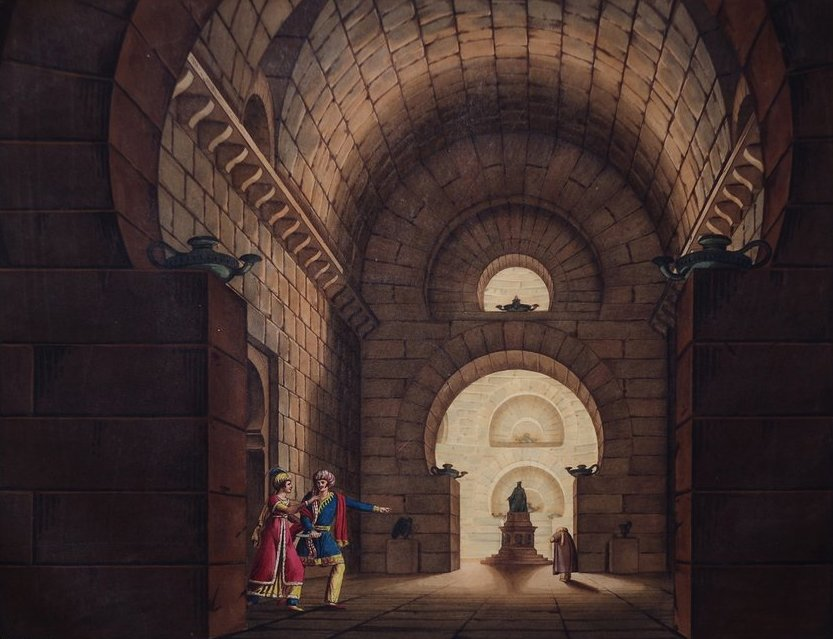
Scene from Maometto (Act 2, scene 7). Set design by Alessandro Sanquirico for the 1826 production at La Scala.

Maometto is an opera by Peter von Winter to a libretto by Felice Romani premièred in 1817 at La Scala, Milan. Romani's libretto is unusual in that it depicts Muhammad, the founder of Islam, following the 1736 play Mahomet by Voltaire, and not Mehmed the Conqueror, the Turkish sultan of the fifteenth century known from Rossini's Maometto II.

== Recording ==
- Maometto Maometto, Sebastian Na (tenor); Zopiro sheriff of Mecca Antonio de Gobbi (bass); Omar Maometto's Lieutenant, Luca Salsi (baritone); Fanor senator of Mecca Cesare Ruta (tenor), Seide Maometto's slave Gloria Montanari (mezzo), Palmira (another slave) Maria Luigia Borsi (soprano). Czech Philharmonic Choir. Czech Chamber Soloists, Brno conducted Gabriele Bellini Marco Polo.

== See also ==
Media related to Maometto (opera by Peter von Winter) at Wikimedia Commons
