= Das unterbrochene Opferfest =

Heroic comique opera

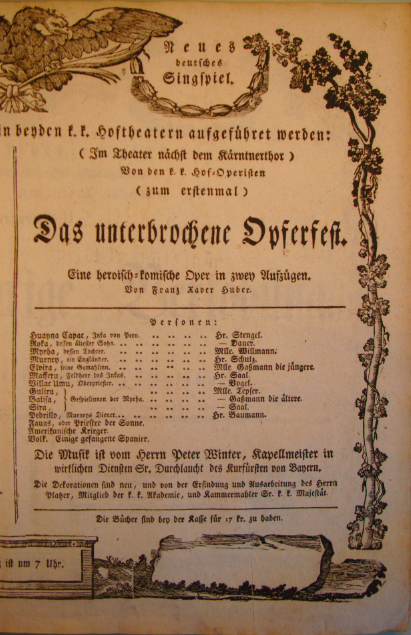
Programme note of the premiere in 1796

Das unterbrochene Opferfest is a heroic-comic opera with spoken dialogue in two acts by Peter von Winter with a libretto by Franz Xaver Huber. The premiere took place on 14 June 1796 at the Theater am Kärntnertor Vienna.

With Opferfest, which (based on novels by Jean-François Marmontel) effectively thematises the conflicts between Europeans and Incas in the 16th century, Winter became almost the only German opera composer of his generation, along with Mozart and Weigl, to achieve European fame. The fact that this happened with a libretto actually more typical of the Wiener Vorstadttheater with intermingled comic scenes and spoken dialogue is less surprising when one considers that Italian adaptations contained recomposed recitatives, some accompanied by string quartet, and in theatre practice everything was also gradually reduced to the serious sphere, which, however, deprives the work of original and by no means disturbing plot elements and musical numbers.

The musical quality of the opera enjoyed great popularity and appeal among audiences in the first half of the 19th century, and as late as 1917 a new production was ventured in Leipzig.

== Content ==
Scholtze's Vollständiger Opernführer in the 1910 edition gives the plot as follows (slightly modernised linguistically):

The Englishman Murney has liberated Peru from the Portuguese and won the friendship of the regent. The envious general Mafferu decides to corrupt the hated man. To do so, he joins forces with Elvira, Murney's wife, a Portuguese woman whose brother fell in the defeated Portuguese army. For this reason, she hates her husband, who also has an obvious love affair with Myrha, the daughter of the Inca. The latter is also won over to the plan by false news. Finally, a sun priest is bribed to produce an artificial thunder at a temple festival and demands Murney's life because the stranger has blasphemed the sun. In vain Murney claims his innocence and finally surrenders to his fate in the face of the false statements of Mafferu, Elvira and Myrha. The Inca tries in vain to save his friend, and his son Roka decides to free the threatened man by force of arms if the worst comes to the worst. The head priest Villac Umu and the fanatical people energetically demand Murney's death by fire, so that the gods' command will be fulfilled and the country will not fall prey to the revenge of the celestials. With the greatest reluctance, the Inca, harassed from all sides, especially by Mafferu, and reminded of his royal duty, finally gives in and has Murney led to the funeral pyre, where Roka is already waiting with his faithful to thwart the murderous attempt. The remorse-stricken women are the first to confess to having been pressured into bearing false witness, and when the head priest upholds the oracle's authority against all exculpatory evidence, the bribed priest also confesses his crime. Mafferu, crushed by the force of these statements, is ordered by the enraged Inca to be put to death in Murney's place. Murney, however, nobly asks to spare his mortal enemy, who is now punished only with eternal banishment. The Inca himself clothes the rescued friend with new honours, and priests and people praise the almighty sun. (Gustav Modes Text-Bibliothek Nr.78.)

== Design ==
Winter's score, with only a slight tribute to the "couleur locale" of the exotic setting Peru and alongside some more conventional numbers with stereotypical melodic phrases, also features a whole series of theatrically effective mass and ensemble scenes.

=== Instrumentation ===
The orchestration of the opera includes the following instruments:

- Woodwinds: two flutes, two oboes, two clarinets, two bassoons.
- brass: four French horns, two trumpets
- timpanis
- strings

== Cast of the premiere ==
- Huayna Capac, Inca of Peru (bass).
- Roka, his eldest son (tenor)
- Myrha, his daughter (soprano)
- Murney, an Englishman (tenor)
- Elvira, his wife (soprano)
- Mafferu, commander of the Inca (bass)
- Villac Umu, high priest (bass)
- Guliru, Myrha's playmate (soprano)
- Balisa, playmate of Myrhas (contralto)
- Sira, playmate Myrhas (soprano)
- Pedrillo, Murney's servant (tenor)
- Jaunas, as priest of the sun (bass)
- Messenger (narrator)
- American warriors, people, captured Spaniards, some Jaunas, retinue of Huayna Capac, confidants of Roka, some girls (choir, extras).
