= Mathurin-Léonard Duphot =

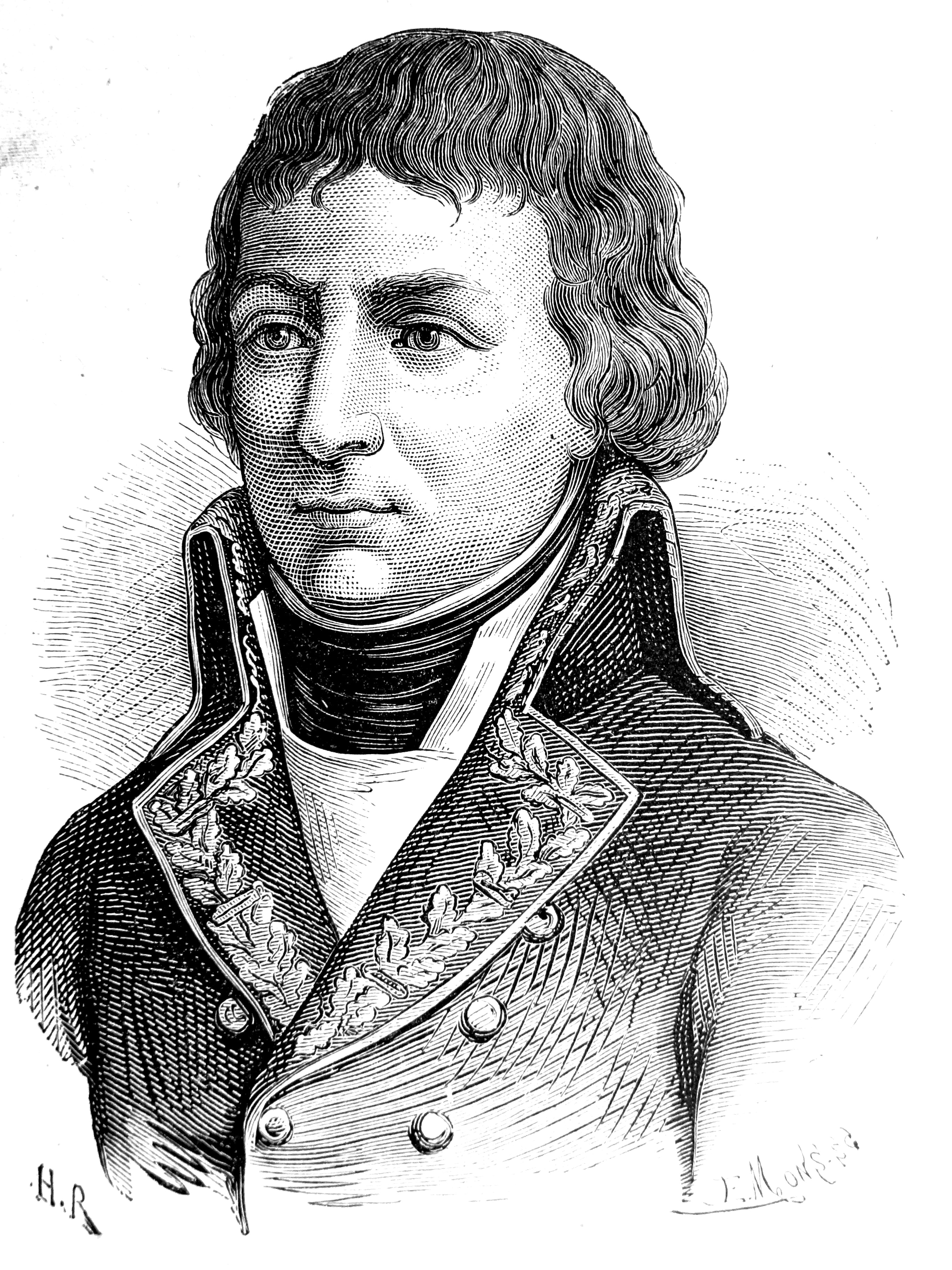
Mathurin-Léonard Duphot.

Léonard Mathurin Duphot (English: /duːˈfoʊ/ doo-FOH, French: [leɔnaʁ matyʁɛ̃ dyfo]; 21 September 1769 – 28 December 1797) was a French general and poet, whose Ode aux mânes des héros morts pour la liberté was highly fashionable at the time.

== Life ==
Duphot was born in la Guillotière, a suburb of Lyon, a stonemason's son. He joined the Vermandois regiment on 25 July 1785 aged 15, rising to sergeant on 25 March 1792, joining the French expedition to Savoy and being sent to Nice. He was a member of one of the national volunteer battalions created on the outbreak of the French Revolution. He was made chef de bataillon adjudant-général in November 1794 and fought with distinction in several actions of the Italian campaign in 1796. He was often mentioned in dispatches by general Augereau. On 13 June 1795 he came off the list of active officers and in February 1796 he was drafted back into the army for home service, though he returned to Augereau and Italy in August 1796, fighting at Mantua, Rivoli and La Favorita.

Johann Michael Mettenleiter, The murder of Duphot, 1799, Bibliothèque nationale de France, Paris

Bonaparte then put Duphot in charge of organising the troops of the Cisalpine Republic. He rose to Général de brigade in the armée d'Italie on 30 March 1797. He then went to Rome with the French ambassador Joseph Bonaparte, where they both tried to incite a Republican revolt, especially by holding a Republican festival at Joseph's palace. This caused a riot and Duphot was fatally shot on December 28, 1797 by Papal State troops. On December 29, 1797, the 250th Roman Catholic Church Pope Pius VI moved quickly and sent a formal apology to the French Directory for the death of Brig General Duphot. However, the apology was not accepted by the 1st Republic, and thus his death gave Bonaparte the pretext he needed to occupy Rome, abolish the Papal States and set up the Roman Republic - in Le Mémorial de Sainte-Hélène, Napoleon said of him "he was a general of the greatest promise. He was virtue itself.". Duphot had been due to marry Joseph's sister-in-law Désirée Clary the day after his death - she eventually married Jean-Baptiste Jules Bernadotte, and became Queen of Sweden, when he became King Charles XIV John in 1818.

== Sources ==
- Marie-Nicolas Bouillet and Alexis Chassang (dir.), "Léonard Duphot" in Dictionnaire universel d’histoire et de géographie, 1878.
- Mullié, Charles (1852). "Duphot (Léonard)" . Biographie des célébrités militaires des armées de terre et de mer de 1789 à 1850 (in French). Paris: Poignavant et Compagnie.
