= Zashchitnaya Bay =

Bay in the Gulf of Finland in the Baltic Sea

Coordinates: 60°45′N 28°43′E

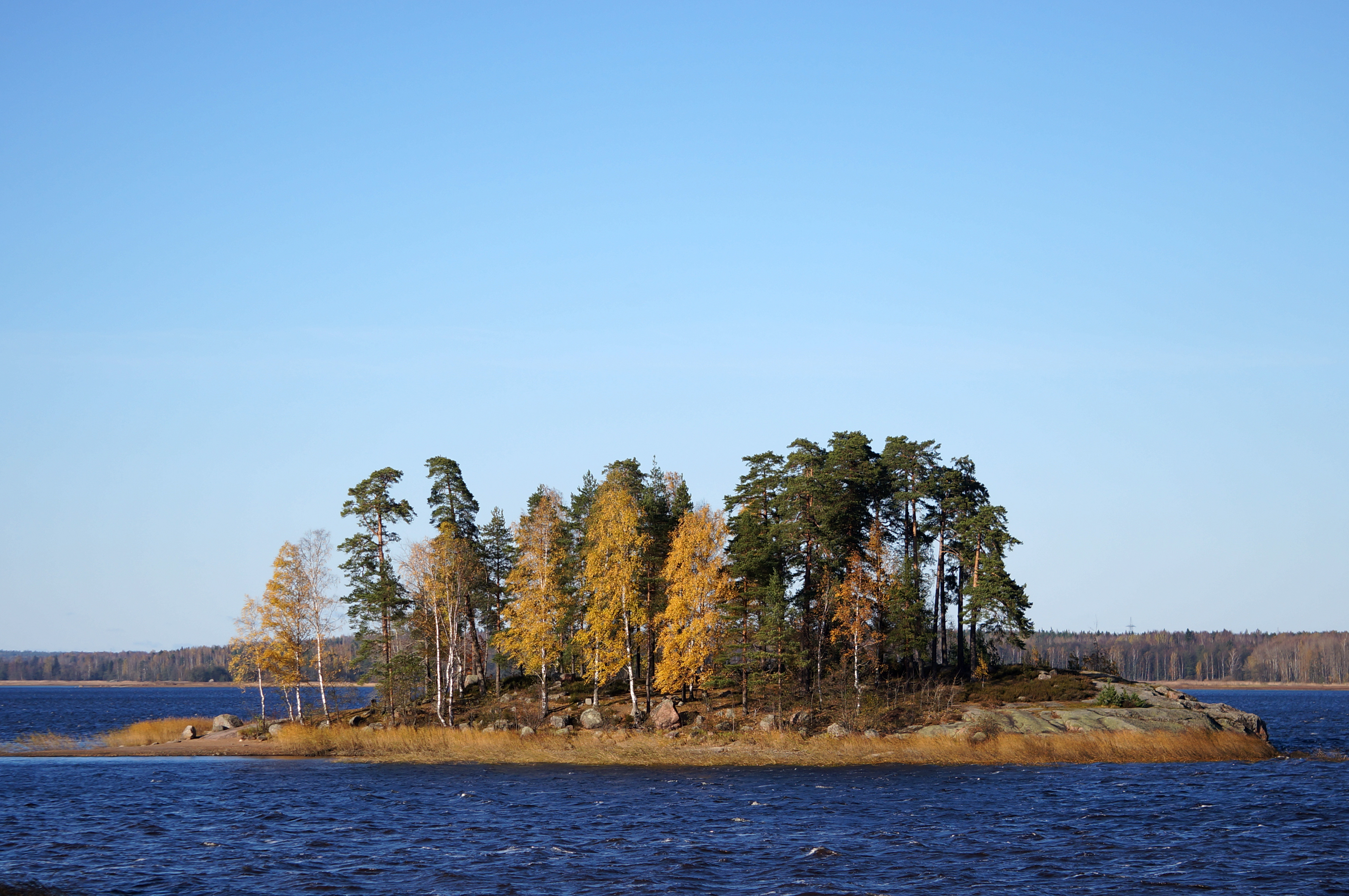
An island in the Monrepos Park

Zashchitnaya Bay (Russian: Бухта Защитная; Finnish: Suomenvedenpohja) is the northernmost part of Vyborg Bay. It is located adjacent to the city of Vyborg (Finnish: Viipuri), Leningrad Oblast, Russia. Vyborg Bay is part of the Gulf of Finland in the Baltic Sea. The Castle of Vyborg and the Monrepos Park face Zashchitnaya Bay. The old Saimaa Canal (opened in 1856), as well as the new one, connect Zashchitnaya Bay with Lake Saimaa in Finland.

== Etymology ==
The Russian name of the bay is derived from the Russian word for defense and may be translated as "shielding".

== History ==
In the Middle Ages, the river Vuoksa had an outlet in Suomenvedenpohja, which however dried up little by little due to post-glacial rebound and was left completely dry in 1857 when the Kiviniemi rapids in Losevo (Russian: Лосево, Finnish: Kiviniemi) were formed and the Burnaya River (Russian: Бурная, Finnish: Taipaleenjoki) became the main outlet of Vuoksa.

== Gallery ==
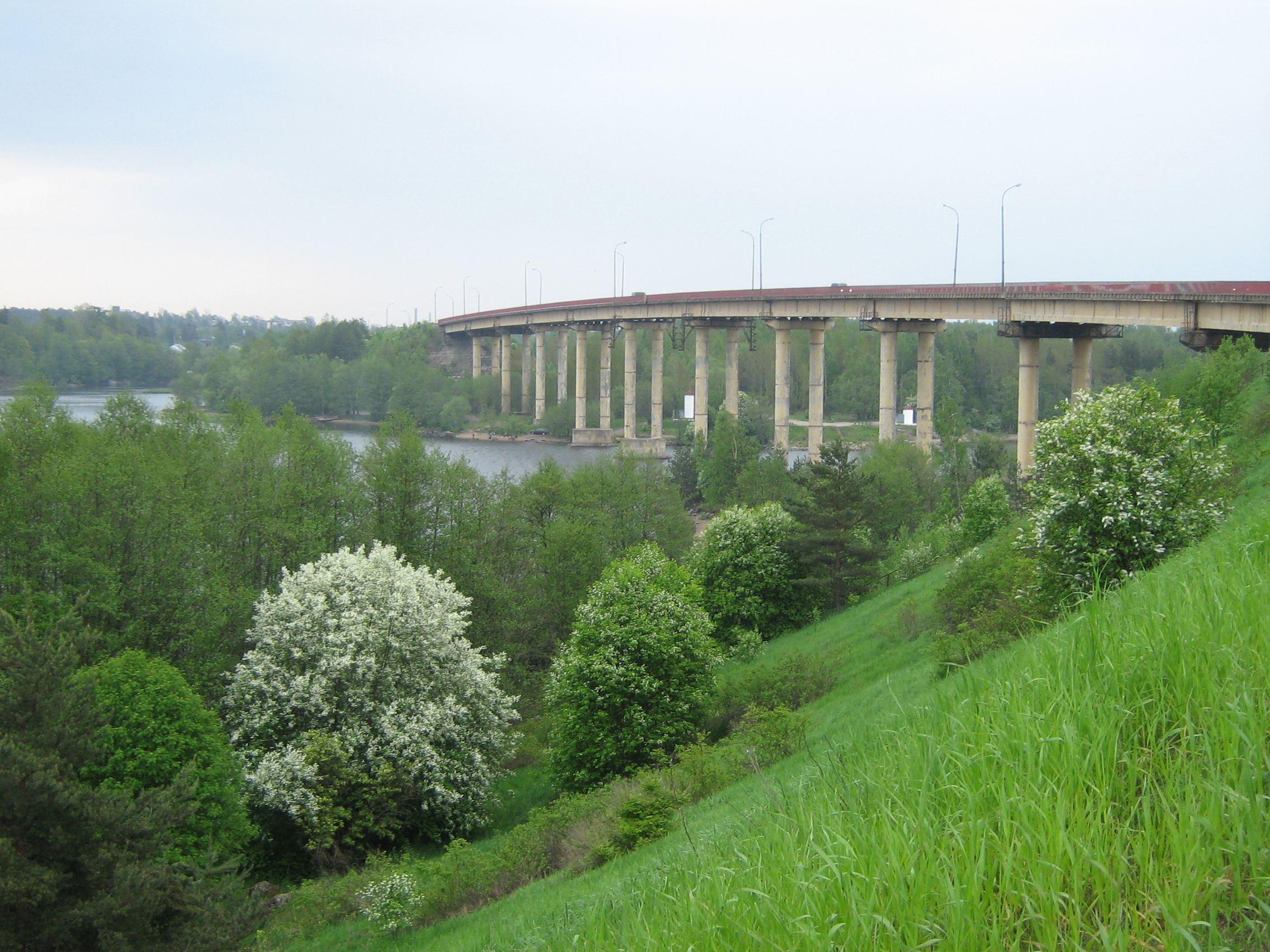
The Gvardeisky Strait (Finnish: Kivisillansalmi) is one of the two waterways leading from the Bay of Vyborg to Zashchitnaya Bay. The present-day sailing route to Saimaa Canal runs below the bridge.

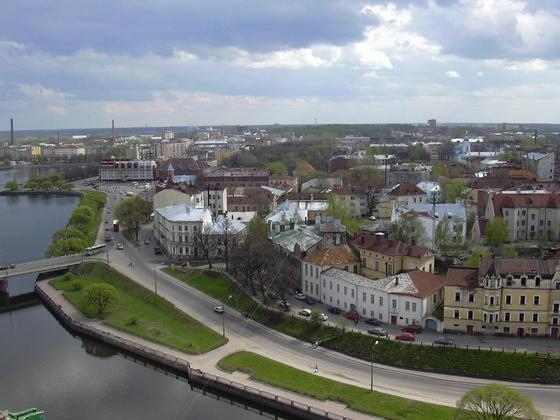
The other waterway from the Bay of Vyborg to Zashchitnaya Bay is Linnansalmi, in which the Castle of Vyborg is located. The old vessel route to Saimaa Canal up to the 1930s ran through Linnansalmi.
