= Das Labyrinth =

1798 opera by Peter von Winter

Das Labyrinth oder Der Kampf mit den Elementen. Der Zauberflöte zweyter Theil.
- Opera by Peter von Winter
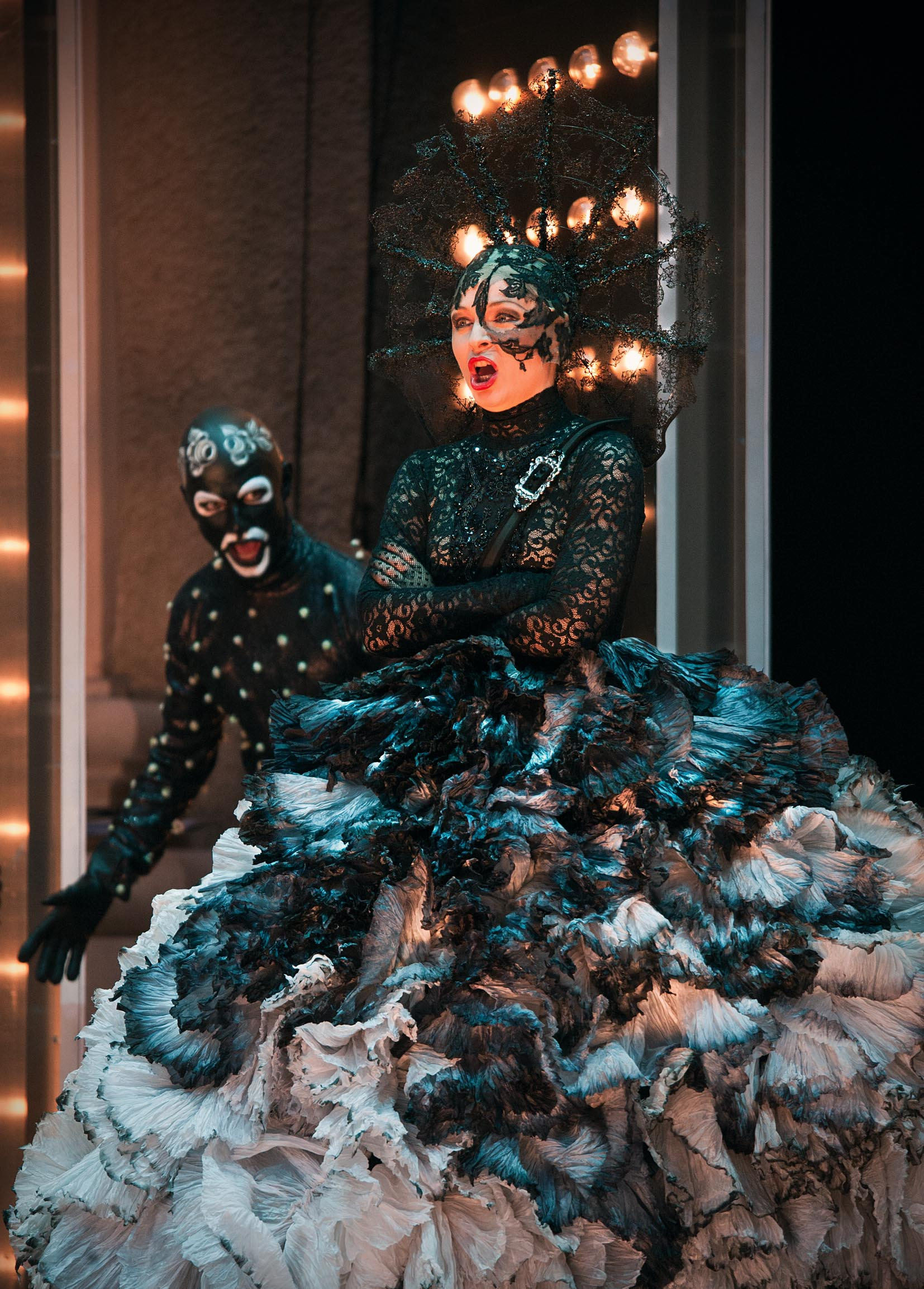
- Klaus Kuttler as Monostatos and Julia Novikova as Queen of the Night at the Salzburg Festival 2012
- Librettist: Emanuel Schikaneder
- Language: German
- Premiere: 12 June 1798; Theater auf der Wieden

Das Labyrinth oder Der Kampf mit den Elementen. Der Zauberflöte zweyter Theil ("The Labyrinth or The Struggle with the Elements. The Magic Flute's Second Part") is a "grand heroic-comic opera" in two acts composed in 1798 by Peter von Winter to a German libretto by Emanuel Schikaneder. The work is in the form of a Singspiel, a popular form that included both singing and spoken dialogue. The opera is a sequel of Mozart's 1791 opera The Magic Flute.

== Performance history ==
The opera premiered at the suburban Freihaus-Theater auf der Wieden in Vienna on 12 June 1798. As he did in Mozart's opera, Schikaneder himself played Papageno, while the role of the Queen of the Night was sung by Mozart's sister-in-law and prominent soprano Josepha Hofer-Mayer. Schikaneder was the librettist of Mozart's opera and he was considered to have been "one of the most original and most influential theatre persons of his time". Both artists were reprising their roles from The Magic Flute.

Alexandra Liedtke, the director of the Salzburg Festival production in 2012, interpreted the story and Schikaneder's libretto "as one [of] the great fairy tales of history ..., in which the emblematic and the playfulness are standing in the limelights".

The opera was then also performed at the Theater an der Wien and the Konzerthaus Berlin (1803), the Opern- und Schauspielhaus Frankfurt (1806), the Staatstheater Nürnberg (1807) and other venues. In 1978, there was a production that was rearranged to be without spoken dialogue, conducted by Wolfgang Sawallisch, directed by August Everding, and with stage design by Jürgen Rose in the Cuvilliés Theatre, Munich. In September 2002, it was performed at Chemnitz Opera with stage direction by Sabine Sterkin, costume and set design by Martin Rupprecht, and music direction by Fabrice Bollon.

In August 2012, the opera was presented for the first time at the Salzburg Festival, in the courtyard of the residence of the Prince Archbishop of Salzburg, conducted by Ivor Bolton and directed by Alexandra Liedtke.

In October 2013, the opera was performed in USA for the first time, by New York City's Amore Opera, the small opera company which emerged after Amato Opera closed.

== Roles ==
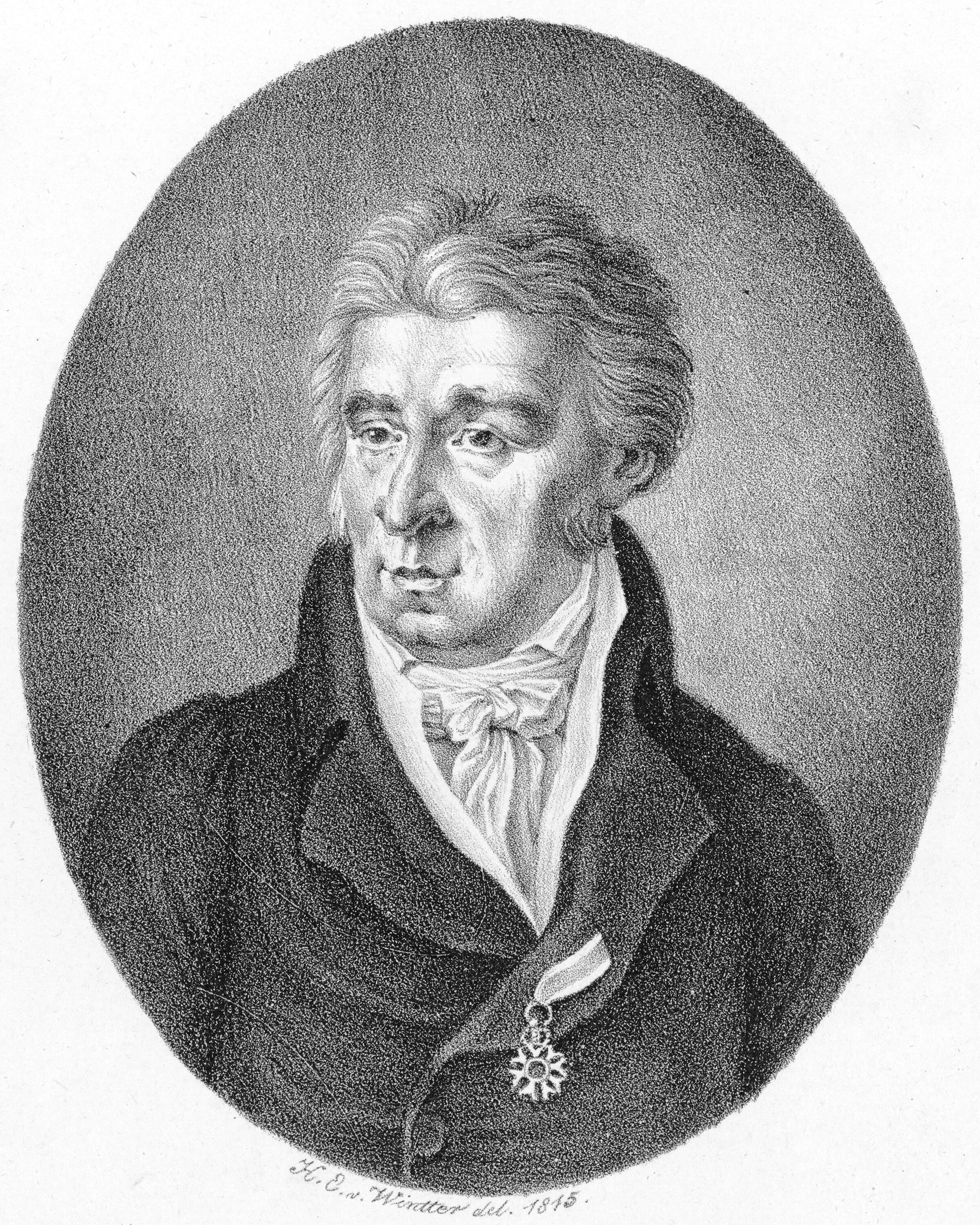
von Winter

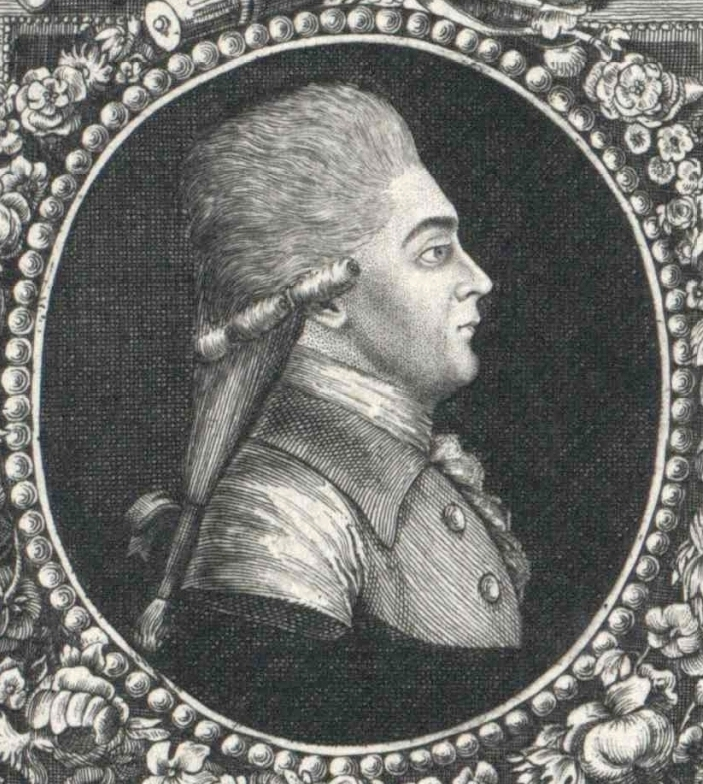
Schikaneder

Roles, voice types, premiere cast
Role	Voice type	Premiere cast, 12 June 1798
Sarastro	bass	Sebastian Mayer
Queen of the Night	soprano	Josepha Hofer-Mayer
Pamina, her daughter	soprano	
Tamino	tenor	
Papageno	baritone	Emanuel Schikaneder
Papagena	soprano	
First Lady (later: Venus)	soprano	
Second Lady (later: Adonis)	mezzo-soprano	
Third Lady (later: their Page)	contralto	
Three Genii	treble, mezzo-soprano, contralto	
Monostatos, a moor	baritone	Jakob Haibel
Tipheus, King of Paphos	baritone	
Sithos, his friend	bass	
High priestess	actress	
Two priestesses	actresses	
Gura, a moor	actress and dancer	
Papageno, Papagena the older	bass, contralto	
Two priests	tenor, bass	
Two guards of the labyrinth	tenor, bass	
Some priests and priestesses, some combatants of Tipheus, several little Papagenos and Papagenas, various moors, and other folk

== Synopsis ==
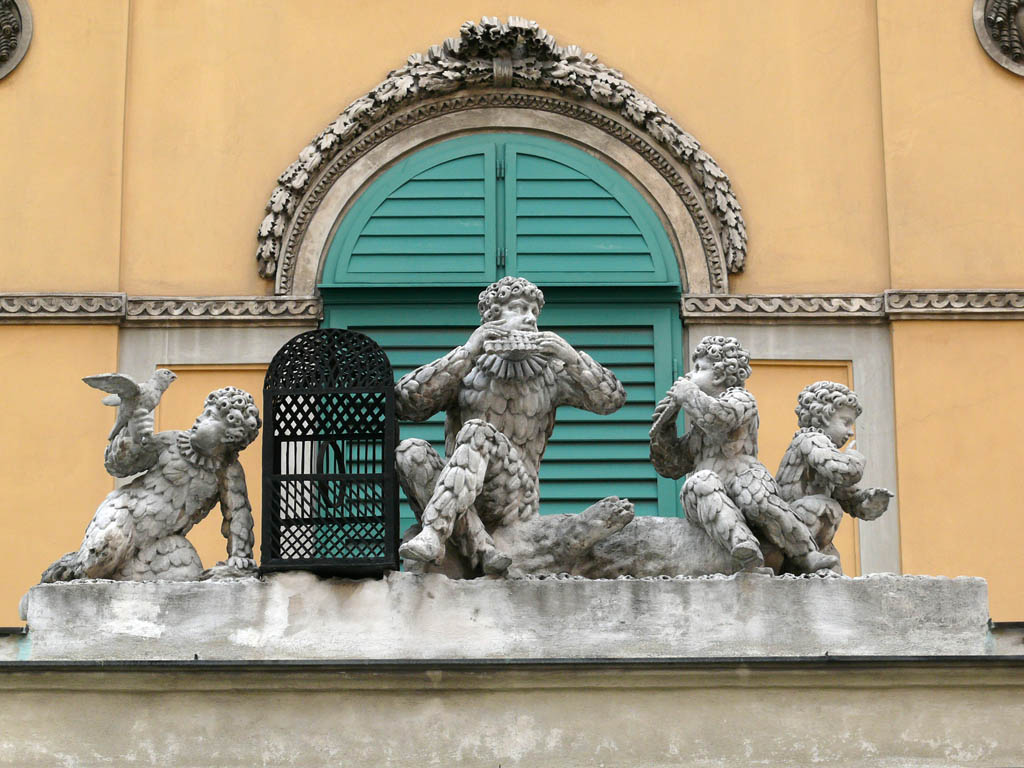
Papageno Gate, the former main entrance of the Theater an der Wien (1801) – Schikaneder as Papageno

After fighting against fire and water there are still two elements for Pamina and Tamino which are not defeated: the air and the earth. The Queen of the Night works with Tipheus to separate the engaged couple while Monostatos tries to force the love of Papagena.

=== Act 1 ===
The opera opens as Pamina and Tamino prepare for their wedding ceremony. Pamina's mother, the Queen of the Night, laments the marriage and disguises the three Ladies into Venus, Adonis, and their Page before telling them to distract the couple long enough for Tipheus to disrupt the wedding. Sarastro announces that the young couple must complete the trial of the labyrinth before their wedding can take place. Tamino promises to play his magic flute so that Pamina will not get lost, and the young lovers enter the trial. While in the labyrinth, however, Pamina's mother separates her from Tamino saying that she has promised Pamina in marriage to Tipheus.

Meanwhile, Papagena has wandered away and Papageno sets off to look for her. Along the way, he finds a small village with an older Papageno and Papagena, who are revealed to be his parents, with several young Papagenos and Papagenas who are introduced as his younger siblings. The Papagenos find and capture Monostatos, who is trying to trick Papagena into falling in love with him. The Papageno family is about to kill Monostatos when he promises Papageno a moorish girl in reward for setting him free. Monostatos is then pardoned and the scene shifts back to Pamina and Tamino trying to find each other.

=== Act 2 ===
This act opens with Papageno and Papagena celebrating their wedding. Unfortunately, this is when Monostatos chooses to make good on his bargain with Papageno which causes Papagena to run off with Monostatos in a fit of anger at Papageno's betrayal. Papageno sets off to find Papagena and rescue her from Monostatos and is instead co-opted into rescuing Pamina from her mother. He finds Pamina, but is not fast enough to prevent the Queen's three Ladies from stealing Tamino to the clouds.

With the help of three genii, Tamino is able to ascend to the clouds, play his flute, and coax Pamina back to earth. The Papagenos once again capture Monostatos, freeing Papagena in the process, while Tamino and Tipheus agree to a duel for Pamina's hand in marriage. Tamino wins the duel, and everyone celebrates his marriage to Pamina.

== Goethe's sequel ==
There is another sequel to the original Magic Flute, also named Der Zauberflöte zweyter Theil, a libretto fragment by Johann Wolfgang von Goethe, intended to be set to music by Paul Wranitzky.
