= Ludwig Heinrich von Nicolay =

German poet (1737–1820)

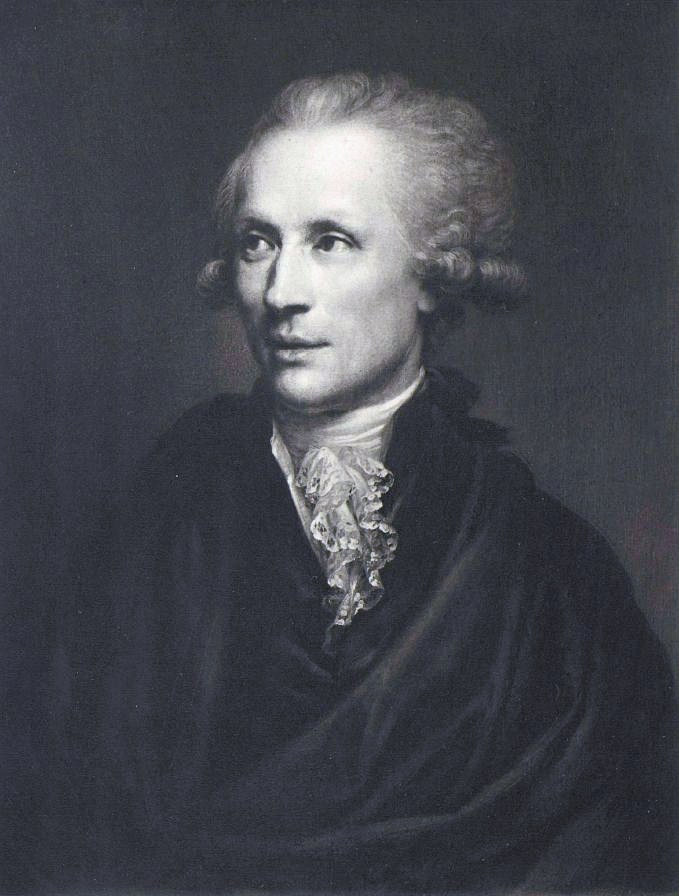
Ludwig Heinrich von Nicolay, by Johann Baptist von Lampi

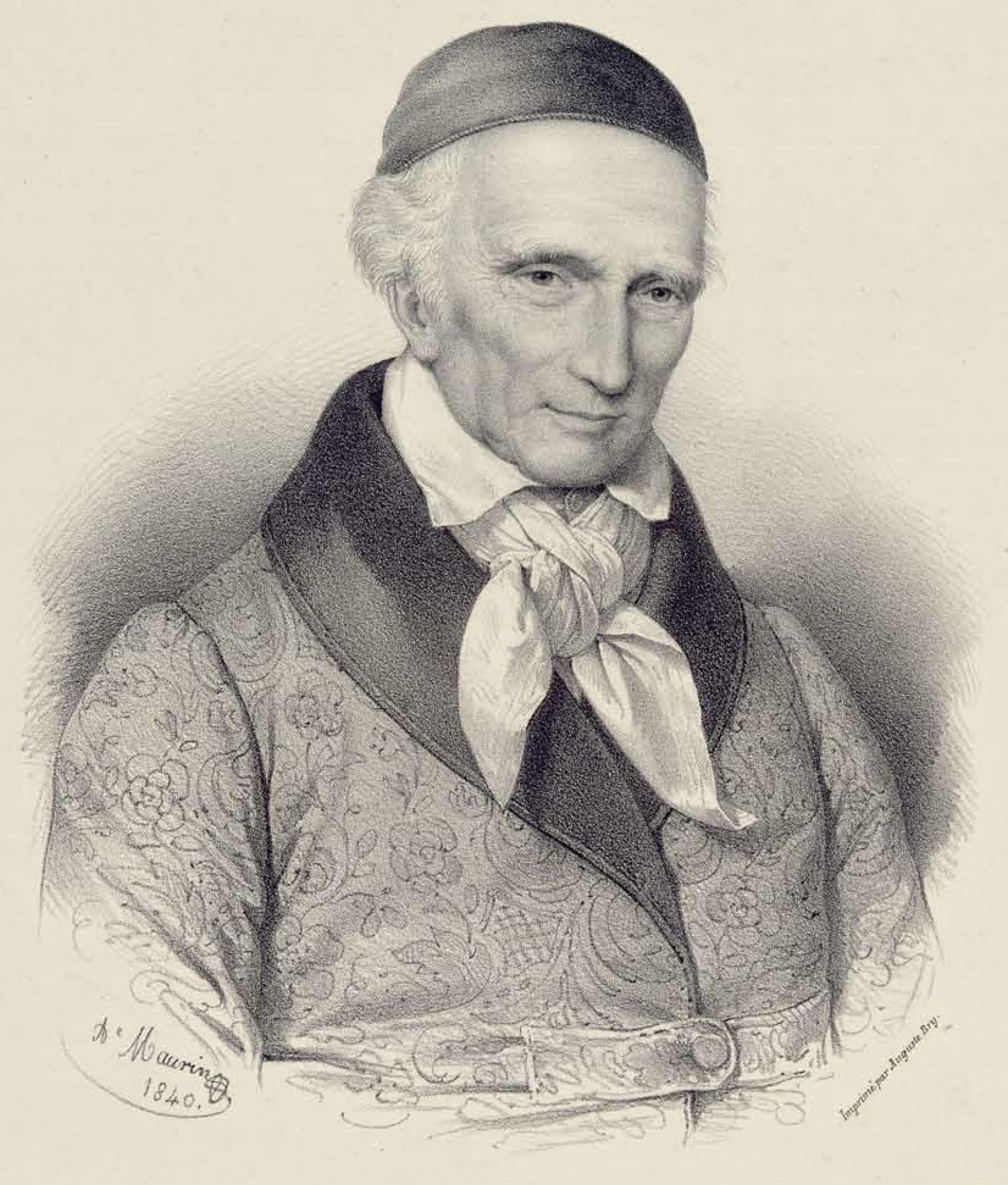
Ludwig Heinrich von Nicolay, age 80, by Auguste Bry

Ludwig Heinrich Freiherr von Nicolay (Russian: Андре́й Льво́вич Никола́и, romanized: Andrey Lvovich Nikolai; 25 December 1737, in Strasbourg – 18 November [O.S. 6 November] 1820, in Monrepos north of Vyborg) was a poet and scholar of the Enlightenment who spent much of his career in the service of the Russian imperial court. He served as president of the St. Petersburg Academy of Sciences between 1798 and 1803, and is remembered as the creator of the Monrepos landscape park near Vyborg and the founder of a significant library of Enlightenment literature, now held at the National Library of Finland in Helsinki.

== Life ==
Nicolay was the son of a Strasbourg archivist, Ludwig Christian Nicolai, and Sofia Katarina Faber. He graduated from the University of Strasbourg with a degree in law. Prince Dmitry Golitsyn, the Russian ambassador in Vienna, employed Nicolay as his secretary after they met in Paris, where Nicolay came to know Voltaire, Diderot, d'Alembert and other leading intellectuals of the Enlightenment.

In 1769 Nicolay was invited to Saint Petersburg to serve as tutor to the future Emperor Paul I of Russia. He went on to serve the grand ducal court in several capacities – as librarian, cabinet secretary and financial administrator – and later as secretary to Paul's consorts Natalia Alexeievna and Maria Feodorovna. In 1776 he married Johanna Margareta Poggenpohl. In 1782 Nicolay was ennobled by Joseph II at Paul's request. When Paul became emperor in 1796, he appointed Nicolay a state councillor and member of the imperial cabinet; the title of baron followed in 1797. He served as president of the St. Petersburg Academy of Sciences from 15 April 1798 to 2 June 1803.

Within the Russian imperial court, Nicolay belonged to the inner circle around Grand Duke Paul, a circle frequently in opposition to Catherine II. His most important patrons beyond the grand ducal couple were counts Nikita Panin and Semyon Vorontsov, both at times out of favour with the empress. Despite being a foreigner of bourgeois origin, Nicolay maintained his position at the turbulent Russian court through personal merit, and the young emperor Alexander I likewise showed him respect and favour.

In 1803 Baron von Nicolay retired to his estate Monrepos, which he had acquired in 1788, north of Vyborg. During the early years of the nineteenth century the estate's buildings were entirely renewed and the park was embellished with plantings, temples and monuments, drawing on architectural influences from the imperial court at Saint Petersburg and its surrounding palace suburbs. Nicolay studied Finnish history and folk poetry, and in designing the park he sought to unite the characteristic features of the Finnish landscape – granite, birch trees, waterways and dark conifers – with the international garden aesthetics of the eighteenth century and the heritage of classical antiquity. After Nicolay's death his son Paul von Nicolay, a diplomat in Russian service, took over the management and development of both the park and the library. The estate remained in the Nicolay family from 1788 until 1944, when Vyborg was incorporated into the Soviet Union.

== Literary work ==
Nicolay was a prolific writer in German, working across the typical literary genres of the eighteenth century: fables, elegies and epistolary verse. His longest works were adventure epics set in a medieval chivalric world, composed after the models of the Italian Renaissance – chiefly Ludovico Ariosto and Matteo Maria Boiardo – several of which he also translated into German. He likewise translated plays by Racine, Molière and Carlo Goldoni. His closest literary model was Christoph Martin Wieland, and he enjoyed a considerable reputation in German literary circles in the generation before Goethe and Schiller's Sturm und Drang.

== Library and collections ==
Nicolay's private library at Monrepos comprised around 9,000 volumes, predominantly Enlightenment literature of the eighteenth century in French, German, English and other languages. It is one of the very few surviving Russian private libraries of the period to have been preserved intact, including the original arrangement of books on the shelves. In 1915 Paul von Nicolay and his sister Marie donated approximately 8,000 of the oldest and most valuable volumes to the University of Helsinki; the collection is now housed in the Monrepos Room of the National Library of Finland in Helsinki. Of the other collections from Monrepos, many of the family portraits are held by the National Museum of Finland, with a smaller number at the Hermitage Museum in Saint Petersburg.

== Individual works ==
- Alcine's Island (1778)
- Zerbin and Bella (1779)
- Reinhold and Angelica (1781–1784)
- Das Landgut Monrepos in Finnland (1804)

== Collected works ==
- Elegien und Briefe. Straßburg 1760
- Verse und Prosa. Basel 1773 (2 vols.)
- Vermischte Gedichte. Berlin 1778–1786 (9 vols.)
- Vermischte Gedichte und prosaische Schriften. Berlin 1792–1810 (8 vols.)
- Theatralische Werke. Königsberg 1811 (2 vols.)
- Poetische Werke. Wien 1817 (4 vols.)
