= Heinrich Eduard Winter =

German painter and lithographer (1788–1829)

- Engraved portrait of The painter Johann Jacob Mettenleiter, 1784, Bavarian State Library
- Born: 1788; Munich, Electorate of Bavaria
- Died: 11 December 1829 (aged 40–41); Munich, Electorate of Bavaria
- Education: Johann Michael Mettenleiter
- Known for: Painting; Engraving
- Movement: Neoclassicism
- Father: Joseph Georg Winter

Heinrich Eduard Winter (also von Wintter; 1788 – 11 December 1829) was a German painter, lithographer and drawing teacher in France and Munich.

== Life ==
Winter was born in Munich. His father, the court and hunting copper engraver Joseph Georg Winter (between 1720 and 1730–1789) died shortly after his birth. His mother subsequently married Johann Michael Mettenleiter, who taught his stepson in such a way that he was soon able to copy some "pictures of the gallery in Munich".

In 1806 – the so-called French period – Winter became professor of draughtsmanship in Sarreguemines, France, but returned to Munich as early as 1809, where he was employed at the Lithographische Anstalt des königlichen Staatsrates founded by Mettenleiter. He died in Munich in 1829.

Winter had two older siblings. Raphael Winter (born 1784), who became an animal painter and etcher, was his brother.

== Work ==
Winter contributed the 88 portrait medallions to the work Portraite der berühmtesten Compositeurs der Tonkunst, published between 1813 and 1821 in 22 booklets with texts by Felix Joseph Lipowsky. In 1820 Winter published a Collection of Landscape Drawings for Beginning and More Proficient Students.

== Gallery ==
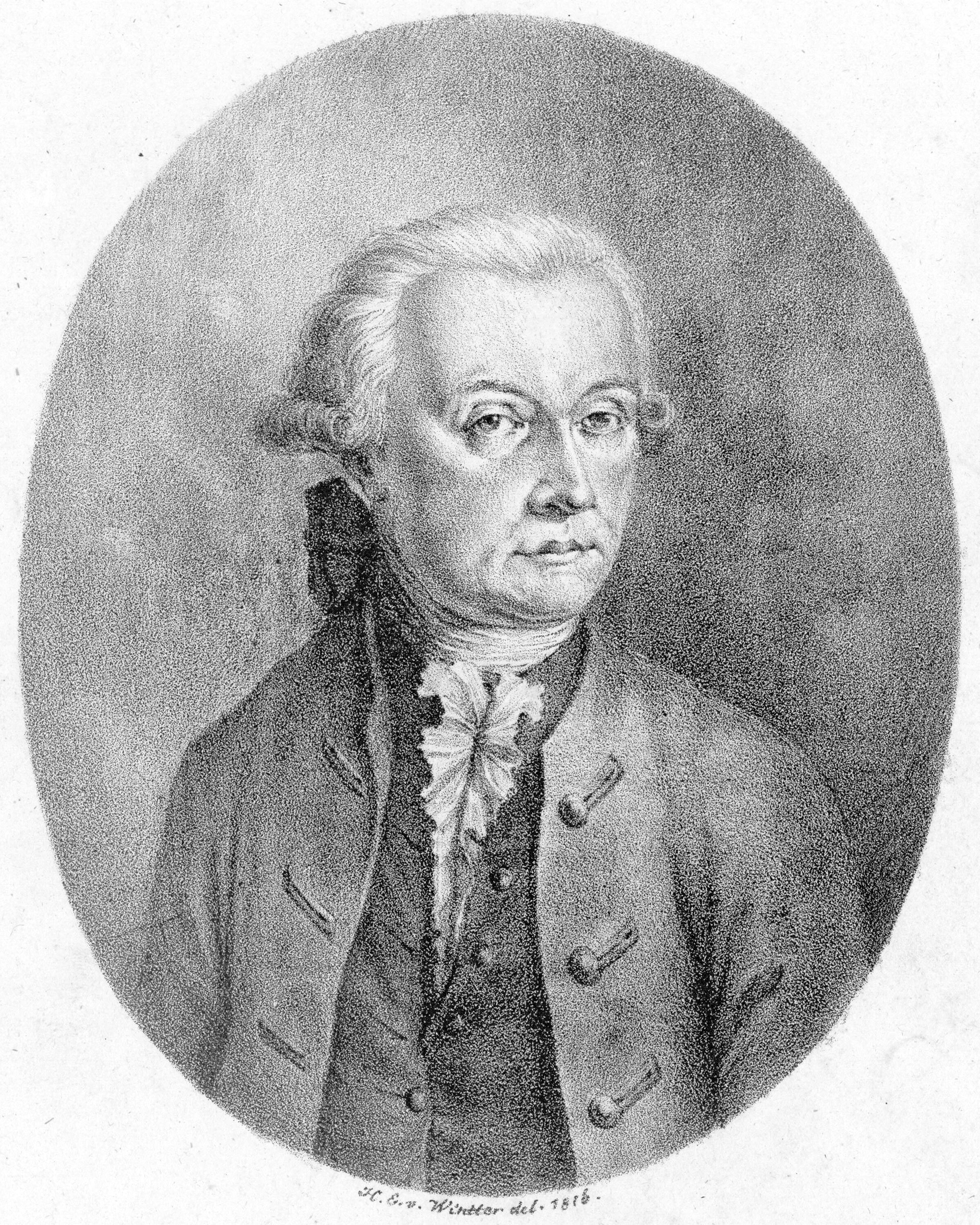
Portrait of Leopold Mozart

Portrait of Johann Georg Albrechtsberger

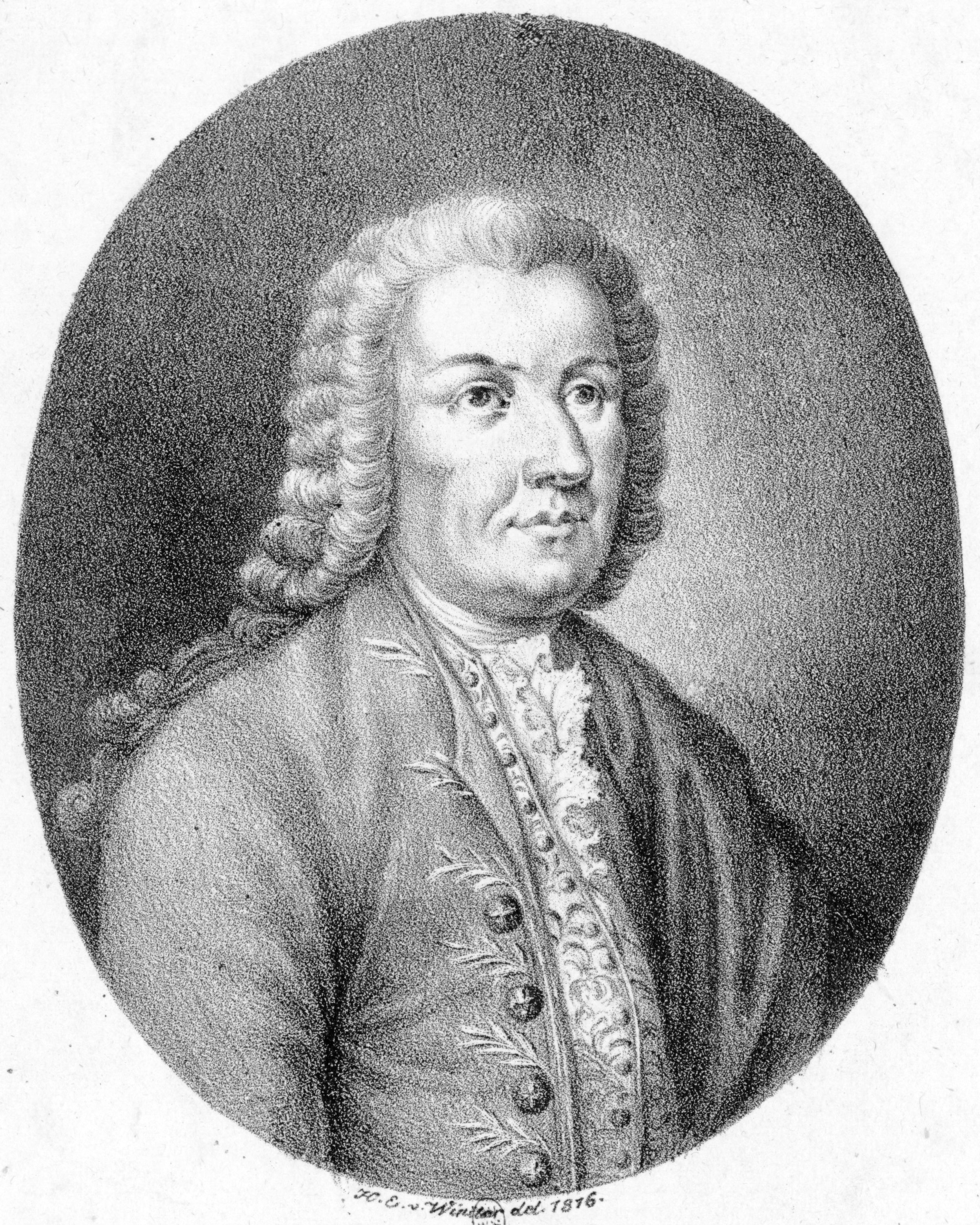
Portrait of Ercole Bernabei

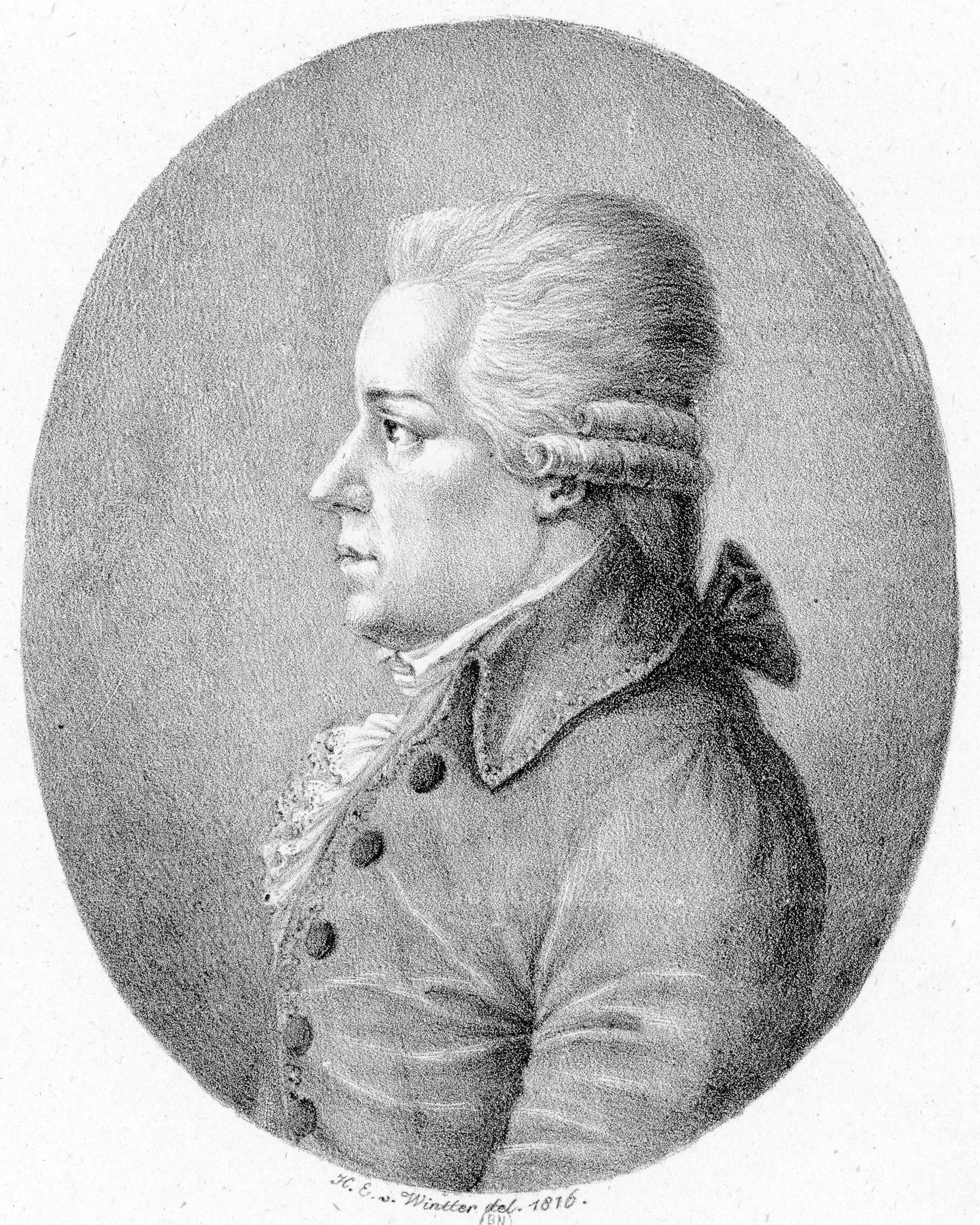
Portrait of Carl Ditters von Dittersdorf

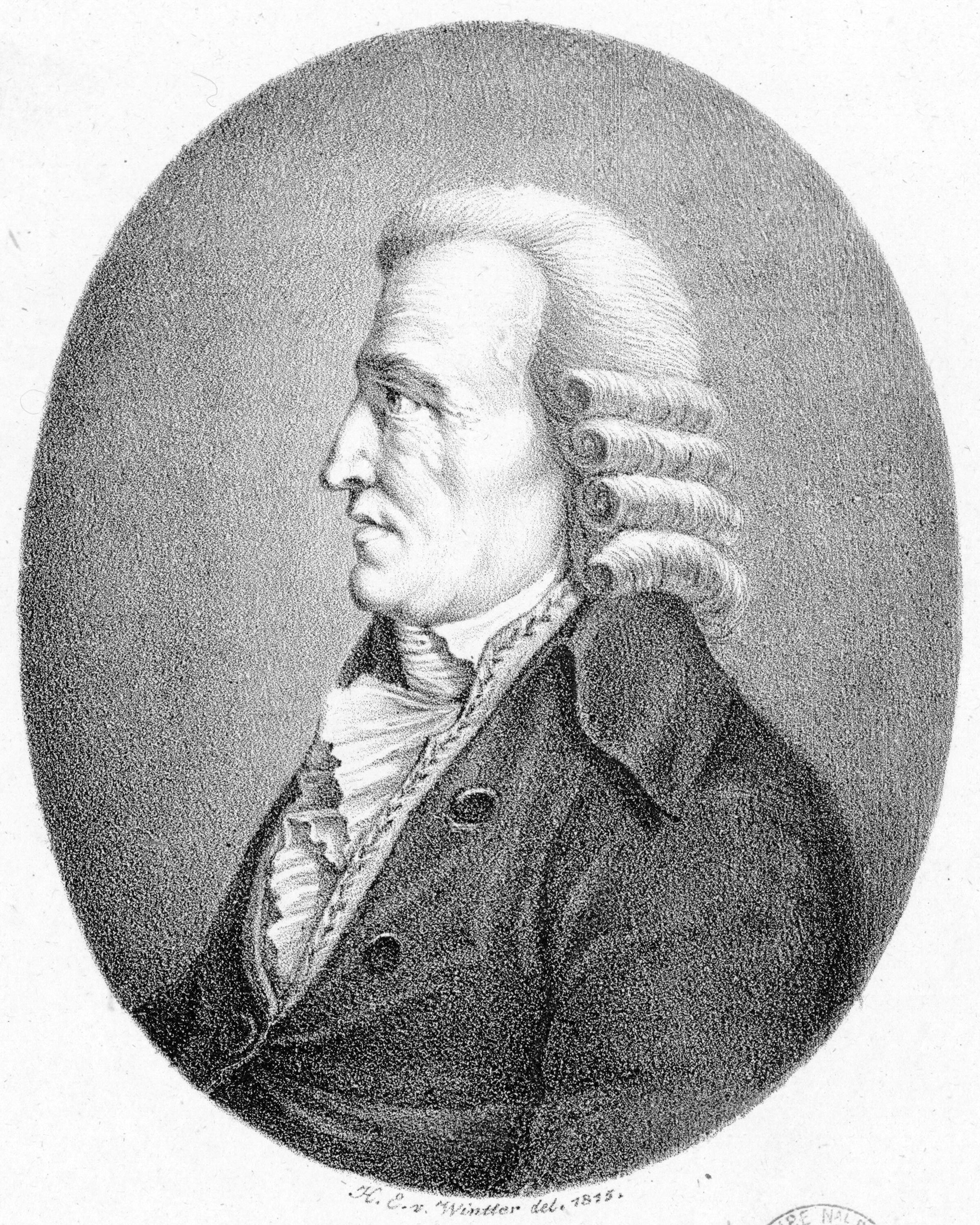
Portrait of Giovanni Battista Ferrandini

Portrait of Domenico Cimarosa

Portrait of Johann Joseph Fux

Portrait of Joseph Haydn
