= Johann Michael Mettenleiter =

German engraver and lithographer

- Ariovistus meets Caesar, 1808, Rijksmuseum, Amsterdam
- Born: 22 April 1765; Großkuchen, now part of Heidenheim an der Brenz, Electorate of Bavaria
- Died: 19 March 1853 (aged 87); Passau, Electorate of Bavaria
- Education: Johann Jacob Mettenleiter
- Known for: Engraving; Litography

Johann Michael Mettenleiter (22 April 1765 – 19 March 1853) was a German draftsman, etcher, copperplate engraver and lithographer.

== Life ==
Johann Michael Mettenleiter was born on 22 April 1765 in the village of Großkuchen, now part of Heidenheim an der Brenz. The son of a schoolteacher and clockmaker, he received his initial training from his 15-year-older brother, the painter and draftsman Johann Jacob Mettenleiter. In 1775–1776, he accompanied his brother on a study trip to Italy. In 1778, he moved with his brother to Augsburg. Following his father's death in 1782, Mettenleiter moved to Munich, where he earned a living as a draftsman, etcher and book illustrator – a pursuit in which he proved quite successful. His contemporaries called him the Bavarian Chodowiecki. He illustrated a great number of books at the end of the 18th century, including Lorenz von Westenrieder's Geschichte von Baiern (History of Bavaria).

Following the death of Joseph Georg Winter, in 1789, Mettenleiter was appointed court engraver by Elector Karl Theodor in 1790. Mettenleiter married Winter's widow and raised her three young children. Following the invention of lithography, Mettenleiter refined the process and set up a lithographic workshop for the Royal Bavarian State Council (Bayerischer Staatsrat). In 1818, he also set up a lithographic workshop and printing press in Warsaw for Tsar Alexander I of Russia. For this achievement, he was honoured with the Order of Saint Stanislaus. Upon his return to Bavaria, he remained in state service until 1833. In 1824, he was admitted as an honorary member of the Royal Bavarian Academy of Fine Arts. In 1844, Mettenleiter was hit by a carriage in Munich and suffered serious injuries. He died in Passau on 19 March 1853, aged 87. His students included his two stepsons, Raphael and Heinrich Eduard Winter, as well as his nephew, Johann Evangelist Mettenleiter, and Domenico Quaglio.

== Gallery ==
The murder of Léonard Mathurin Duphot, 1799, Bibliothèque nationale de France, Paris

Buonaparte lands in Egypt, 1799, Bibliothèque nationale de France, Paris

The Commission of Inquiry, copper engraving, c. 1790

Officers of the Electoral Saxon Army, 1802

== Bibliography ==
- Hyacinth Holland (1885). "Mettenleiter, Joh. Michael" . Allgemeine Deutsche Biographie (in German). Vol. 21. Leipzig: Duncker & Humblot. pp. 524–525.
- "Mettenleiter, Johann Michael". Benezit Dictionary of Artists. Oxford: Oxford University Press. 2011. doi:10.1093/benz/9780199773787.article.B00121563.
