= List of cancelled Super NES games =

The Super Nintendo Entertainment System (SNES), known as the Super Famicom in Japan, is a video game console released by Nintendo in 1990 as the successor to the Nintendo Entertainment System. The system enjoyed great success until being succeeded by the Nintendo 64 in 1996. During its lifetime, multiple games for the system were cancelled during development for reasons such as financial troubles, quality concerns, or the desire to shift to developing 3D games for newer consoles such as the Nintendo 64 and PlayStation. This list documents games that were confirmed to be announced or in development for the SNES at some point but did not end up being released for it. This includes some games that were cancelled or never officially released, only to be finished and receive an aftermarket release decades after official support for the system had ended.

== Games ==
There are currently 99 games on this list. (Note: This number is always up to date by this script.)

List of cancelled Super NES games
Title(s)	Notes/Reasons	Developer	Publisher
The 7th Guest	During development of The 7th Guest (1993), Nintendo struck a console exclusivity deal with Virgin Interactive Entertainment to bring the game to their upcoming SNES-CD add-on. However, the SNES-CD was never released, leading the port to be cancelled; the only console port released would be for the CD-i.	Trilobyte	Virgin Interactive Entertainment
Acclaim's World Cup Soccer	Present at CES 1993, where it was described as being scheduled for the Sega Genesis and SNES in North America without a concrete release date, the game never released in any capacity.	Acclaim Entertainment	Acclaim Entertainment
Action 52	A SNES version of the unlicensed game compilation Action 52 (1991) was scheduled for release in October 1993, but failed to materialize.	Active Enterprises	Active Enterprises
Akira	An adaptation of the 1988 anime film Akira was planned for release on Genesis, SNES and Sega CD in 1995, with Game Boy and Game Gear games based on the film also being considered. Gameplay and content varied wildly among versions, but disagreements in the direction of the games with THQ occurred and the game fell onto the backburner, never releasing for any system. The Genesis version later leaked onto the internet in 2019.	Black Pearl Software	THQ
Albert Odyssey: Legend of Eldean	Originally beginning development for Super Famicom, the project was later shifted to the Sega Saturn, where it was released in 1996.	Sunsoft	Sunsoft
Alnam no Kiba: Shouzoku Juunishin-to Densetsu	A port of the Turbografx-16 game Alnam no Kiba (1994) was announced for release in March 1996, but failed to materialize.	Right Stuff	
AV-8B Harrier Assault	The 1992 PC game was announced to have versions created for the Sega CD, SNES, and 3DO for 1994, though only the 3DO version ever materialized (under the name Flying Nightmares).	Simis	Domark
Baby's Day Out	A video game adaptation of the 1994 film Baby's Day Out was announced for Genesis, SNES, and Game Boy, and advertised on the film's VHS release. The game involved the player using a cursor to keep the film's baby out of trouble. Despite being far enough along for publications to receive review copies in late 1994, no versions of the game were ever released. The few reviews that were published were generally not positive, citing slow and boring gameplay.	Designer Software	Hi Tech Expressions
Barbie: Vacation Adventure	A Barbie-themed minigame compilation was in development for SNES and Genesis, and was far enough along in development for review copies to be sent out to magazines in late 1994, though neither version saw release. The game is set to be released for the first time in 2026 as part of the Barbie Rewind game compilation.	Software Creations	Hi Tech Expressions
Batman: Revenge of the Joker	A SNES port of Batman: Revenge of the Joker (1992), the Genesis remake of Batman: Return of the Joker (1991), was announced but never released.	ICOM Simulations	Sunsoft
Blaster Master 2	A SNES port of Blaster Master 2 (1993) was announced in March 1992, though a report from the Summer Consumer Electronics Show later that year claimed the version was still far from completion. The game was ultimately only released on the Genesis.		Sunsoft
Boo!	A platformer in the vein of Sonic the Hedgehog or Super Mario, starring a ghost boy who goes around scaring enemies by yelling out "boo!" Announced for the Genesis, SNES, and Amiga, and was far enough along to be the cover story of Amiga One magazine, along with a tentative October 1994 release. Financial problems with the game's publisher led to its cancellation.	The Conversion Company	MicroProse
Brimstone	Brimstone was an RPG in development for the Super Famicom. While a demo was produced, the game was put on indefinite hold after only a month of development to focus on a Genesis port of Lufia & the Fortress of Doom (1993), which ultimately went unreleased as well.	Teknocrest	Taito
Brutal Sports Football	Ports of the Amiga game Brutal Sports Football (1993) were announced for the SNES, Genesis, and Atari Jaguar. The Jaguar version was released in 1994, but the Genesis and SNES versions were delayed and never saw release.	Millennium Interactive, Teque London	Spectrum HoloByte, MicroProse
Untitled Carlos Sainz racing game	In 1994, Nintendo of Spain signed a sponsorship deal with professional rally driver Carlos Sainz Sr. to appear in advertisements for Nintendo products in the region. Nintendo and Sainz also confirmed that a video game bearing his name would be released in September of that year, but this failed to materialize.		Nintendo
Cluster Buster	The side-scrolling space shooter Cluster Buster was announced in 1993, but the game was cancelled after failing to find a publisher.	Rage Software	
Comanche: Maximum Overkill	A SNES port of Comanche: Maximum Overkill (1992) was exhibited at E3 1995, and would have utilized the Super FX powered GSU-2, but was never released.	NovaLogic	
Congo	A video game adaption of the 1995 film Congo was concurrently in development for Genesis and SNES, unrelated to the Saturn game Congo The Movie: The Lost City of Zinj (1996). The game was to feature multiple gameplay styles, including platforming, white water rafting, and some shooting segments, to represent various sequences from the film. The game underwent a difficult and rushed five month development period, and though it was completed by its intended completion date, publisher Viacom's concerns over quality and a game bug led to its cancellation.	Visual Concepts	Viacom New Media
Converse Hardcore Hoops / Converse City Ball Tour	Announced at E3 1995 for the Genesis, Saturn, 32X, SNES, PlayStation, and PC, the game was reportedly far in development, but was cancelled and never released in any capacity. Despite a large budget and a then-impressive 15,000 frames of animations, the game reported garnered very negative reactions from test audiences, who did not like the game's half-court, two versus two set up.		Virgin Interactive Entertainment
Cooly Skunk	The sidescrolling platformer Cooly Skunk was initially developed for SNES. However, due to the declining sales of 16-bit consoles, the decision was made to shift development to the PlayStation, where it released as Punky Skunk (1996). In 2019, a demo of the SNES version that was broadcast over Satellaview was found and released onto the internet.	Ukiyotei	Visit
Disney's Pocahontas	A video game adaptation of the animated film Pocahontas was in development for Genesis and SNES, but only the Genesis version saw release.	Funcom	Disney Interactive
Dominus	Genesis and SNES versions of the 1994 real-time strategy MS-DOS release were announced, but never materialized.	Visual Concepts	ASCII Corporation
Dragon's Heaven	A video game adaptation of Dragon's Heaven, an expansion for the Japanese tabletop RPG Hyper Tunnels & Trolls, was announced for a 1995 release on Super Famicom. Development of the game later shifted to the Saturn before ultimately being cancelled.	Digitalware	Data East
Dream: Land of Giants	The game started development on the SNES as developer Rare's effort to use apply the faux-3D graphics implemented in their popular Donkey Kong Country series of platform games in a different genre. They prototyped a role-playing game, but its scope became too much for the SNES hardware to handle, and the game transitioned to the Nintendo 64. The game went through many changes with the added power of the new hardware, but ultimately, seeing Super Mario 64 (1996) made the team feel like their work would feel dated on the new platform, and they ended up cancelling the game. Some of its work would subsequently be used towards an attempt at a game more similar to Super Mario 64, which became Banjo-Kazooie (1998). A prototype of the SNES version was leaked online in 2026.	Rare	Nintendo
Dwagons	A box-pushing puzzle video game in the vein of Sokoban announced for the SNES and Genesis, the game never materialized for either platform.	Imagitec Design	
DynoBlaze / Dinoblades	A beat 'em up game announced for the Genesis, Sega CD, and SNES, about dinosaurs that wear rollerblades and play street hockey. It was scheduled for a late 1995 release, but never materialized in any capacity.	Bonsai Entertainment	Virgin Interactive Entertainment
Elite	A SNES port of Elite (1984) was announced in 1993 and was said to feature a more console-friendly interface compared to the original release. However, this version of the game never found a publisher and was cancelled. In September 2024, Ian Bell released the source code of the unfinished SNES port to commemorate the 40th anniversary of the original game.	Hybrid Technology	
Falcon	A port of Falcon (1987) was announced for SNES in 1993, but never materialized.		Spectrum HoloByte
Final Fantasy VII	The earliest work on the game began on the SNES in 1994; a few months of pre-production and planning work was done, but was then dropped when much of the development staff was pulled away to finish Chrono Trigger (1995). When they returned to the project, they put together early plans on what the game could look like on the Nintendo 64 and its 64DD add-on, and did various technical tests with the N64 hardware, though no substantial work on it was finished, and the work was scrapped as they moved on to developing for the PlayStation again, where the game released in 1997.	Square	Square
Firearm	A run-and-gun game based on the Malibu Comics superhero Firearm was in development, but was cancelled.	Malibu Interactive	Malibu Interactive
Fireteam Rogue	A large budget action-adventure game in development for the Genesis and SNES. It was envisioned as a multi-media project that would have included a comic book series and collectible holograms, but the game experienced a prolonged, difficult development period between 1993 and 1995. It was eventually cancelled when its publisher decided that the game's quality juxtaposed with the end of the platforms lifespans couldn't make it a profitable project, and it never released on either platform.	Accolade	Accolade
Future Zone	GamePro reported on its presence at CES 1993, describing it as a "cinematic side scrolling action/adventure" game with large environments in the vein of Super Mario World. The game was announced for the Genesis and SNES and scheduled for release in Q3 1993, but never released for either.		Electro Brain
FX Fighter	Originally announced under the name Fighting Polygon in 1994, GTE Entertainment and Nintendo were set to co-publish the game, but after publishing the SNES port of Killer Instinct (1994), Nintendo decided to cancel the SNES version of FX Fighter to avoid the two games having to compete with one another. GTE would subsequently decide to release the game for MS-DOS in 1995.	Argonaut Software	GTE Entertainment, Nintendo
Gargoyles	A video game based on the animated series Gargoyles was in development for the Genesis and SNES, though only the Genesis version saw release.	Disney Interactive Studios	Disney Interactive Studios
Gearheads	A SNES version of Gearheads (1996) was scheduled for release late 1996, even receiving magazine reviews, but was cancelled.	Philips Media	Philips Media
Golden Empire: The Legend of Scheherazade	At the Winter Consumer Electronics Show in January 1992, GamePro reported that an SNES game titled Golden Empire was officially announced by Culture Brain as a follow-up to The Magic of Scheherazade (1987). The magazine made further mention of the game in their coverage of the following year's Winter CES, now titled Golden Empire: The Legend of Scheherazade. As late as 1996, the Japanese publication Family Computer Magazine listed the game for Super Famicom as Scheherazade Densetsu - The Prelude, with an unknown release date. Ultimately, the game never materialized.	Culture Brain	Culture Brain
GoldenEye 007	The video game adaptation of GoldenEye began development for SNES in 1994 as a side-scrolling platformer with pre-rendered graphics, similar to Donkey Kong Country, but the decision was made to change genres to a shooting game and move development to the Nintendo 64, for which it released in 1997.	Rare	Nintendo
Gordo 106	A SNES remake of Gordo 106 (1993) was in development by Atomic Games, a company formed by the game's original artists Erich and Max Schaefer, after they obtained the game's intellectual property rights. While the game was showcased at the 1994 Winter Consumer Electronics Show, development was cancelled after the game's planned publisher DTMC went out of business.	Atomic Games	DTMC
Home Alone 2: Kevin's Dream	A video game loosely based on the film Home Alone 2: Lost in New York, taking place in Kevin McCallister's dreams, was announced in May 1993 by Argonaut Software for SNES. This version never released, with the developers presuming it was due to the significant length of time between the releases of the film and the game. In January 1994, it was announced that the game would now be developed by Unexpected Development for Game Boy, with a late 1994 release date. Later that same year, the publisher decided that they no longer felt the Home Alone IP would be profitable, so the decision was made to retool the game into one based on the animated series Bobby's World. The new version featured the same premise, gameplay, and stages, but replaced all of the characters with those from Bobby's World. Ultimately, neither version of the Game Boy game was released, though ROMs of both versions would later be discovered as part of the 2020 Nintendo data leak.	Argonaut Software	THQ
Impossible Mission 2025: The Special Edition	A remake of Impossible Mission (1984) was released for Amiga platforms a decade later under the title Impossible Mission 2025 (1994). While "special edition" versions for later announced for the SNES and Genesis, and far enough along to be previewed by print magazines, but neither special edition ever released.	MicroProse	MicroProse
In the Hunt	A SNES port of the arcade game In the Hunt (1993) was demonstrated at the 1994 Winter Consumer Electronics Show, but failed to materialize.	Irem	Irem
Jelly Boy 2	A sequel to Jelly Boy (1991), released in North America as Smart Ball, was in production and was set to feature multiple playable characters and non-linear progression similar to Mega Man (1987). Though the game was near completion, Sony chose to cancel it along with all other games they had in production to focus on developing new games for their upcoming console, the PlayStation.	Game Freak	Sony Imagesoft
Joe Vs. The Wall	The puzzle platformer Joe Vs. The Wall was announced at the 1992 Winter Consumer Electronics Show, but failed to materialize.	Ocean Software	Ocean Software
Journey to the Center of the Earth	A video game adaption of the television series of the same name announced for the Sega CD, Game Gear, SNES, NES and Game Boy. While multiple adaptions released in the 1980s and 2000s, none of the proposed versions of the 1990s, SNES included, ever released.		Sony Imagesoft
Kaboom: The Mad Bomber's Return	A reboot of the Atari 2600 game Kaboom! (1981) was announced alongside two other Activision reboots, Pitfall: The Mayan Adventure and River Raid: Mission of No Return. Though showcased at the 1993 Summer Consumer Electronics Show, only Pitfall was released, with the other two reboots being cancelled.	Sculptured Software	Activision
Kid Kirby	A new entry in the Kirby series, featuring younger versions of characters like Kirby and King Dedede, was in development between 1994 and 1995. The game would have featured a 3D art style and been controlled with the Super NES Mouse. However, the game was cancelled due to its slow development time and the poor sales of the mouse.	DMA Design	Nintendo
Killer Instinct 2	A SNES version of Killer Instinct 2 (1996) was in development, but was cancelled in favor of a Nintendo 64 release.	Rare	Midway Games
Lobo	A fighting game based on the Lobo comic book series was announced, and far enough along to have review copies sent to publications, but it never released. A prototype of the game was later dumped in 2016.	High Performance Games	Ocean Software
Mario Factory	In 1994, Nintendo filed a patent for the "Game Processor", a device through which hobbyist independent developers could design their own Super Famicom games. The patent described a potential software concept for the Game Processor titled Mario Factory, which would allow users to switch between playing and editing their games on the fly. While neither the Game Processor nor Mario Factory were publicly released, evidence suggests both saw use internally at Nintendo, and the concept of freely switching between gameplay and editing would later be revisited in Super Mario Maker (2015).	Nintendo	Nintendo
Mechanoids 2: The Final Conflict	A beat 'em up featuring giant mech suits battling enemies was shopped around to publishers around 1992, but the project was shelved before ever being announced. Two prototype builds were shared online by members of the development team in 2025.	Enigma Variations	
Mission Impossible	When Ocean Software first announced they had acquired the rights to create a video game adaption of the 1996 Mission Impossible film in 1996, announced platforms included the 32X, SNES, Saturn, and Genesis. However, a lengthy development period delayed it well beyond most of the platforms' lifespans, leading to it only releasing on the Nintendo 64 and PlayStation by the time of its 1998 release.	Ocean Software	Infogrames
Molotov Man	In 1992, Sensible Software began development on an action game inspired by the Bomberman series, with the protagonist using molotov cocktails in place of bombs. However, the game failed to find a publisher and was never released.	Sensible Software	
Monster Truck Wars / USHRA Monster Truck Wars	A monster truck battling game announced for the SNES and Genesis, the game was scheduled for a January 1995 release date, but never materialized for either platform.		Acclaim Entertainment
Mortal Kombat Nitro	After the lukewarm response to the SNES port of Mortal Kombat (1992), which removed the arcade game's fatalities and blood, an updated version was proposed, which would restore the removed violence along with adding new content such as playable Goro, Shang Tsung, and Reptile. Although a prototype was developed, the project was cancelled to focus on the SNES port of Mortal Kombat II (1993).	Sculptured Software	Acclaim Entertainment
Mother 3	The third entry in the Mother video game series had an extensive 12 year development history plagued by platform changes. Originally conceived for the SNES, development was moved to the Nintendo 64 after being inspired by the 3D graphics and movement of Super Mario 64 (1996), where it went by the name Earthbound 64. However, the game's large scope, and the development transition to and from the 64DD, caused slow progress with the game, and it was eventually cancelled in favor of moving Nintendo's software teams to working on the GameCube in late 2000. Development was later restarted on Game Boy Advance, where it was reworked for its hardware and finally released, exclusively in Japan, in 2006.	HAL Laboratory	Nintendo
Mr. Tuff	Announced for the SNES, Sega CD, and Genesis, as a platformer with a high difficulty level. The game followed "Mr. Tuff", a robot left behind to demolish the earth and its malfunctioning robots after humans have escaped to a new planet. The Sega CD version was reported to have improved graphics beyond the other two version. Despite being close to completion and scheduled for a late 1994 release, no version of the game ever released. The game eventually received an aftermarket release by independent publisher The Retro Room in 2023.	Sales Curve	
Nandemo!? Taihoman	Based on the manga of the same name, Nandemo!? Taihoman would have featured the ability for its protagonist, the robot police officer Taihoman, to fuse with objects to gain new abilities. While previewed in magazines, the game was never released.	Namco	Namco
Peaky Blinder	A side-scrolling game involving the player controlling "Peaky", a literal amalgamation and personification of garbage, which aspires to overcome his life in the slums to become a respectable person in a nice house. The game featured a shapeshifting gameplay mechanic for fighting enemies. Announced for the SNES, Game Boy, Game Gear, Sega CD, and Genesis, the game was never released for any platforms.		Sales Curve Interactive
Pelé!	A SNES version of Pelé! (1993) was slated for a March 1994 release and was far enough along to be reviewed by Diehard GameFan, but was not released.	Radical Entertainment	Accolade
Phase Zero	Initially conceived as a top-down shooter for SNES, the team later shifted development to the Atari Jaguar due to its more powerful hardware. However, the game was ultimately cancelled due to Atari pulling support for the Jaguar.	Hyper Image Productions	
Pinkie	A version of the 1994 Amiga release was in development for the SNES and Genesis for later that year, but neither materialized during their platform's respective lifespan.	Data Design Interactive	Tengen
Popil	Popil was a 2D platformer featuring simulated 3D graphics. Screenshots of an early version of the game were shown in Consoles+ magazine, but no further details were ever released.	Sunsoft	
Prime	A beat-'em-up game based on the Malibu Comics superhero Prime was in development, but was cancelled.	Malibu Interactive	Malibu Interactive
Puggsy	While a SNES port of Puggsy (1993) was completed, it was ultimately never released, though the developers have expressed interest in releasing the game online.	Traveller's Tales	Psygnosis
Quik the Thunder Rabbit	A SNES port of Quik the Thunder Rabbit (1994) was in development, but never released. A playable prototype later surfaced in 2017.	Stywox	Titus Interactive
Quinty	A remake of the Famicom game Quinty (1989), known as Mendel Palace outside Japan, was planned for Japanese distribution via the Nintendo Power service, but was never released. A prototype ROM was later discovered as part of the October 2024 Game Freak leak.	Game Freak	Nintendo
Radio Flyer	A video game adaptation of the 1992 film Radio Flyer was announced, but never materialized.	Ocean Software	
Railroad Tycoon	A version of the 1990 PC release was announced in 1992 for the Genesis and SNES, and present at CES 1993, but neither console version ever released.	MPS Labs	MicroProse
Rayman	Throughout the game's lengthy planning and development period in the late 1980s and early 1990s, the game was planned for a number of platforms that it never released on, including the 32X, SNES, and 3DO. A SNES prototype of the game was found in 2017, and was included in the 2026 Rayman: 30th Anniversary Edition compilation.	Ubi Soft	Ubi Soft
Resident Evil	The original Resident Evil (1996) began development on the SNES as a spiritual sequel to Capcom's video game adaptation of the 1989 film Sweet Home. Following the release of the PlayStation, Capcom decided to shift the game's development to the new system, as its greater power and storage capacity would allow them to expand the game's scope.	Capcom	Capcom
River Raid: Mission of No Return	A reboot of the Atari 2600 game River Raid (1982) was announced alongside two other Activision reboots, Pitfall: The Mayan Adventure and Kaboom: The Mad Bomber's Return. Though showcased at the 1993 Summer Consumer Electronics Show, only Pitfall was released, with the other two reboots being cancelled.	Beam Software	Activision
Robosaurus	A side-scrolling action game based on Robosaurus was announced in 1992, but failed to materialize.	Adrenalin Entertainment	THQ
Rocket Knight Adventures	A SNES port of Rocket Knight Adventures (1993) was announced, but never released.	Konami	Konami
Satellite Man	A beat-'em-up starring a superhero who utilized the power of satellites was in development, but failed to materialize.	T&E Soft	
The Shadow	A video game adaption of the 1994 film The Shadow was announced for the SNES, Atari Jaguar CD, and the Genesis. The game was scheduled for a November 1994 release, and far enough along to be reviewed by many video game publications, but the game never released due to the commercial failure of the film.	Ocean Software	Ocean Software
Shadow Stalker	A 2D sidescrolling shooter based around mech combat was shown at Nintendo's 1993 Shoshinkai trade show, but never materialized.	Athena	
ShadowHawk	A video game starring the Image Comics superhero ShadowHawk was in development late in the SNES life cycle, but failed to find a publisher due to the game's violent imagery.	Studio e	
Shantae	The debut entry in the Shantae series was initially pitched as a game for SNES and PC. After finishing development of Xtreme Sports (2000) for Game Boy Color, the decision was made to develop Shantae for the system using the same engine and tools, eventually releasing in 2002.	WayForward Technologies	
Socks the Cat Rocks the Hill	A platformer starring a cartoon version of Socks, the pet cat of Bill Clinton while the President of the United States, was announced for the SNES and Genesis, under slightly different names. The game was far enough along to be reviewed by multiple magazines, but the publisher closed before the game could ship, and its release was cancelled. Builds of the SNES version were obtained by collectors in 2011 and 2012; one of these collectors partnered with publisher Second Dimension who, after a Kickstarter campaign in 2016, eventually released an aftermarket version of the game in 2018.	Realtime Associates	Kaneko
Sound Fantasy	Interactive media artist Toshio Iwai was invited by Nintendo to convert his installation art piece "Music Insects" into a video game. Initially titled Sound Factory, the game was designed as a music creation tool similar to Mario Paint (1992). While publicly shown at events such as Shoshinkai and set for a 1994 release, the game was cancelled later that year for unknown reasons. A prototype of the game would later surface online in 2015.	Nintendo	Nintendo
Spellcraft	A SNES port of Spellcraft: Aspects of Valor (1992) was far enough along to receive a review in the April 1994 issue of Electronic Gaming Monthly, but was never released.	Ybarra Productions	
Star Fox 2	The sequel to Star Fox (1993) began development shortly after the completion of the original game. The game was demonstrated at trade shows and was planned for release in August 1995. However, Nintendo was concerned that the game's simplistic 3D polygons would be compared unfavorably to games on competing consoles, such as the PlayStation and Saturn, and decided to cancel the nearly finished game in favor of focusing on the Nintendo 64 and its own Star Fox game, Star Fox 64 (1997). Multiple unfinished prototypes of the game surfaced online over the following years. In 2017, Nintendo announced that the finished game would be released for the first time as one of the included games on the Super NES Classic Edition mini-console, later receiving a wider digital distribution in 2019 via the Nintendo Switch Online service.	Nintendo EAD, Argonaut Software	Nintendo
Steven Seagal is the Final Option	A beat-'em-up game featuring the digitized likeness of actor Steven Seagal was announced in 1994 for the Genesis and SNES, but was never released. A playable beta prototype of the SNES game was later found and released online.	Riedel Software Productions	TecMagik
Super Battletoads	A SNES port of the arcade game Battletoads (1994) was in development, but was cancelled following the arcade game's poor sales.	Rare	Tradewest
Super Road Rash	In April 1996, THQ announced a SNES version of Road Rash (1991) for a Christmas 1996 release that ultimately did not materialize.		THQ
Super Shadow of the Beast	An enhanced port of Shadow of the Beast (1989) was in development for SNES, but was not approved for release by Nintendo due to the game's violent content.	Psygnosis	IGS Inc.
Super Yoshi No Tamago	As part of the October 2024 Game Freak leak, a Nintendo DS prototype was discovered containing a remake of Yoshi (1991). The game's use of "Super" in its title and copyright year of 1995 led many to conclude that the prototype was based on an unreleased Super Famicom version.	Ape Inc., Game Freak	Nintendo
Survival Arts	A conversion of the 1993 arcade game was announced in 1994, but was quietly cancelled by Sammy the following year.	Scarab	Sammy Corporation
Tarzan: Lord of the Jungle	A SNES version of Tarzan: Lord of the Jungle (1994) was in development, but was cancelled prior to release due to the game's uneven quality. In 2019, the game's lead programmer Jim Grundell publicly released the SNES prototype and several pieces of development documentation, including the game's source code, onto the internet.	Manley & Associates	GameTek
Thunder in Paradise	A SNES adaptation of the Thunder in Paradise TV series, unrelated to the 1995 video game adaptation, was announced in 1994. The co-op action game would have featured multiple gameplay styles, including controlling protagonists Hurricane and Bru in top-down and side-scrolling levels, as well as controlling their boat Thunder in levels using Mode 7 simulated 3D. While no reason for its cancellation was given, the TV series was cancelled after one season shortly following the game's announcement.	The Software Toolworks	
Time Killers	Ports of the arcade game Time Killers (1992) were announced for the SNES and Genesis, with an intended release in Spring 1994. However, the SNES version was cancelled early that year, while the Genesis version experienced a fraught development period and did not release until 1996.		THQ
Transformers	A video game based on the Transformers: Generation 2 franchise was planned for release in 1994, and would have featured 3D graphics utilizing the Super FX chip. However, the game was never released.	Argonaut Software	Takara
Ultrabots: Sanction Earth	Originally announced in 1992 for release on SNES and PC by Data East, the SNES version was cancelled, while the PC version was acquired by Electronic Arts and released in 1993.	NovaLogic	Data East
Warrior of Rome III	A third entry in the Warrior of Rome series was planned for SNES, and would have utilized the Super NES Mouse, but went unreleased.	Micronet	Micronet
Wing Commander II: Vengeance of the Kilrathi	A SNES conversion of Wing Commander II (1991) was announced for release in May 1995, but never materialized.	FCI	
Wrestlerage	A follow-up to WWF WrestleMania and WWF WrestleMania Challenge, Wrestlerage would have been a side-scrolling beat-'em-up starring eight fictional wrestlers. The game was allegedly 60% complete when it was cancelled, due to the uncertain financial prospects of releasing a wrestling game that did not feature any real-life wrestlers.	Rare	
Xenon 2: Megablast	A port of Xenon 2: Megablast (1989) for SNES was announced in November 1992, but was never released.	The Bitmap Brothers	
Yoshitsune Densetsu	Yoshitsune Densetsu was an action RPG that told a fictionalized version of the story of Minamoto no Yoshitsune, with events differing depending on which of the four playable characters the player chose. Manga artist Shotaro Ishinomori was said to have been involved in the project, but the game failed to materialize.		ASCII Corporation
Zelda II: The Adventure of Link	Prior to the release of The Legend of Zelda: Ocarina of Time (1998), Yoshiaki Koizumi experimented with creating a remake of Zelda II: The Adventure of Link (1987) for SNES. The prototype retained the game's two-dimensional gameplay, but featured a polygonal Link and more expansive sword-based combat. While the project did not move forward, the swordfighting system was carried over and refined in Ocarina of Time.	Nintendo EAD	Nintendo
