= Battle Clash =

1992 video game

- North American box art by Stephen Peringer
- Developer: Intelligent Systems
- Publishers: NA/EU/JP: Nintendo; BRA: Playtronic
- Directors: Makoto Kano; Masao Yamamoto
- Producer: Gunpei Yokoi
- Programmers: Kouichi Abe; Osamu Yamauchi; Toru Narihiro; Toshihiro Nishii
- Artists: Naotaka Onishi; Toshitaka Muramatsu
- Composer: Yuka Tsujiyoko
- Platform: Super Nintendo Entertainment System
- Release: NA: October 1992; EU: January–February 1993; JP: June 21, 1993; BR: December 1993
- Genre: Light-gun shooter
- Modes: Single-player, multiplayer

Battle Clash (Note: Known in Japan as Space Bazooka (Japanese: スペースバズーカ, Hepburn: Supeisu Bazūka)) is a 1992 light gun shooter video game developed by Intelligent Systems and published by Nintendo for the Super Nintendo Entertainment System. It is one of a small number of titles that requires the Super Scope, a light gun. Set in a futuristic post-apocalyptic Earth where battles are fought with mechs called Standing Tanks (STs), a man named Mike Anderson participates in the Battle Game to face the ruthless champion Anubis. The player acts as the gunner of the ST Falcon piloted by Anderson, taking on Anubis and his subordinate chiefs in one-on-one fights.

Battle Clash was created by Team Battle Clash, a group within Intelligent Systems that developed games for the Super Scope, made up of Nintendo R&D1 staff responsible for light gun shooters such as Duck Hunt and Hogan's Alley. It was co-directed by Makoto Kano and Masao Yamamoto, and produced by Gunpei Yokoi. The soundtrack was scored by Yuka Tsujiyoko, best known for her work in the Fire Emblem and Paper Mario series. The game garnered average reception from critics; praise was given to the visuals, but other expressed mixed opinions regarding the sound and gameplay. Some reviewers also criticized its low difficulty. It was followed by Metal Combat: Falcon's Revenge (1993), and Team Battle Clash would later work on Tetris Attack (Note: Known in Japan as Panel de Pon (パネルでポン, Paneru de Pon)).

== Gameplay ==
Internal view of the ST Falcon, battling the ST Garam in New York

Battle Clash is a light gun shooter game which requires the Super Scope, a light gun peripheral for the Super Nintendo Entertainment System, to be played. The plot takes place in a futuristic post-apocalyptic Earth, where battles are fought with mechs called Standing Tanks (STs) and the winner takes control of the world. A young man named Mike Anderson participates in the Battle Game to face the ruthless champion Anubis and avenge his father's death.

The player acts as the gunner of the ST Falcon piloted by Anderson, and the main objective of the game is to take on Anubis and his subordinate chiefs in a series of nine one-on-one fights. The player can attack enemies using rapid fire by holding down the fire button, energy bolts, bombs, and a variety of limited-use special items. Energy bolts are charged when the player is not firing and are fired once a power meter fills, but is limited to a single shot. The player can counter enemy fire by intercepting their projectiles. Some enemy attacks can only be deflected by shooting energy bolts.

Each enemy ST has its own attack patterns and destructible weak points that the player must exploit to inflict damage depending on how powerful their shot is. The player wins if the enemy ST's energy is depleted first, but the game is over if the rival depletes the player's energy or if the stage is played for ten minutes. When the player completes the game, they will be given a cheat code that, when input at the title screen, unlocks multiple difficulty levels. In addition, the game also has a time trial mode where the player must defeat enemies to achieve the best time possible and a two-player mode.

== Development and release ==
Battle Clash was created by Team Battle Clash, a group within Intelligent Systems that developed games for the Super Scope light gun, made up of Nintendo R&D1 staff responsible for light gun shooters such as Duck Hunt and Hogan's Alley. It is one of six titles that requires the Super Scope. It was co-directed by Makoto Kano and Masao Yamamoto, both of whom formed Team Battle Clash, and produced by Gunpei Yokoi. Kouichi Abe, Osamu Yamauchi, Tadashi Inui, Toru Narihiro, and Toshihiro Nishii acted as co-programmers. Naotaka Onishi and Toshitaka Muramatsu were responsible for the graphical design. Muramatsu had previously worked on Fire Emblem: Shadow Dragon and the Blade of Light and Fire Emblem Gaiden for the Famicom, as well as Super Scope 6. The soundtrack was scored by Yuka Tsujiyoko, best known for her work in the Fire Emblem and Paper Mario series. Nintendo first published the game for the Super Nintendo Entertainment System in North America in October 1992, followed by a European release between January and February 1993, and later in Japan as Space Bazooka on June 21, 1993. Playtronic released it in Brazil in December 1993. The Western cover was illustrated by artist Stephen Peringer.

== Reception ==
Reception

Review scores
Publication	Score
Consoles +	72%
Famitsu	7/10, 6/10, 7/10, 5/10 (Note: Famitsu's review was by four critics.)
GameFan	60%, 83%, 65%, 63% (Note: GameFan's review was by four critics.)
GamesMaster	36%
Hyper	50/100
Joypad	72%
Joystick	45%
Player One	84%
Super Play	48%
Total!	28%
Electronic Games	81%
Gamestar	51%
Hippon Super!	7/10
Nintendo Magazine System	55/100
Power Play	68%
SNES Force	35%
Super Gamer	57%
Super Pro	67/100

Battle Clash received average reception from critics and retrospective commentators. It received a 20.8 out of 30 score in a public poll taken by Family Computer Magazine. Nintendo Power's three reviewers found the game fun, highlighting the enemy mechs and sound effects, but noted its lack of depth. Super Pro's Mark Wynne considered it a decent attempt at a Super Scope game. He felt that the "tongue-in-cheek" plot translated well into the large enemy sprites, but said its sound department was weak. Chris Buxton of Total! commented favorably on the game's visuals, but criticized its forgettable soundtrack, very simple gameplay, and low difficulty. Electronic Games' Marc Camron praised the game for its graphical presentation, smooth gameplay, lack of slowdown, and variety of modes, but found the audio to be unremarkable and faulted its easy difficulty.

GameFan's five reviewers commended its colorful graphics, sound, and screen-filling bosses, but criticized the gameplay for lack of diversity and felt that the game did not take advantage of the Super Scope. Joypad's Nini Nourdine gave the game favorable remarks for its immersive sense of action, fast parallax scrolling, and music, but saw the lack of originality as a shortcoming. Joystick's expressed his disappointment with the game, finding it to be boring and uninteresting. Power Play's Michael Hengst pointed out the game's lack of variety, writing that "In the long run, the primitive shooting of Battle Clash is certainly no guarantee of long-lasting motivation". Super Play's Jonathan Davies found the game more exciting compared to previous Super Scope titles, but ultimately felt it was very limited and repetitive.

GamesMaster's Andy Lowe gave positive remarks to the audiovisual presentation, but faulted its limited playability, dialogues, and low difficulty. Player One's Olivier Scamps called it a very playable title, praising its varied bosses and action, but pointed out its easy difficulty. Sami Souibgui and Marc Lacombe of Consoles + celebrated the game's overall production values but criticized its repetitive action. Super Gamer labelled it as a nice-looking but shallow shooter game. Hardcore Gaming 101's David DeRienzo highlighted the enemy sprites for their animations and high level of detail, while also praising the game's special effects and catchy music. Retro Gamer considered Battle Clash to be a great showcase for the Super Scope, while Destructoid's Zoey Handley regarded it as one of the few games worth playing for the peripheral.

== Legacy ==
A sequel to Battle Clash titled Metal Combat: Falcon's Revenge was developed by the same team at Intelligent Systems, and published by Nintendo in North America in December 1993 and in Europe in May 1994. The game was only released in Western regions, as the Super Scope proved to be less popular in Japan. Gunpei Yokoi and Team Battle Clash would later go on to work on Tetris Attack, being the last Super NES title created by the group. The ST Falcon was later included as a Spirit in Super Smash Bros. Ultimate.
