= Makoto Kano (video game designer) =

Japanese game designer and supervisor

- Born: October 30, 1950 (age 75); Kyoto, Japan
- Occupations: Nintendo Supervisor; Game Designer
- Employer: Nintendo (1974–1998)

Makoto Kano (加納 誠, Kanō Makoto; born October 30, 1950), also credited as Makoto Kanoh pre-1995, is a Japanese game designer and supervisor. He was born in Kyoto, Japan.

Kano began working for Nintendo in 1974. He was one of the original designers in Nintendo's creative department. Originally, he designed toys and board games before working on the Nintendo Beam Gun series. Kano eventually became one of the lead designers of the Game & Watch series. By 1984, he was heavily involved in several Nintendo R&D1 games, including Hogan's Alley, Gyromite, and more specifically the Metroid, Kid Icarus, and Famicom Wars series. Some other projects he has worked on at Nintendo include Super Metroid, the Super Scope for the Super Nintendo Entertainment System, and Mario & Wario.

Kano is credited with creating several early Nintendo characters during the 1980s. Ultimately, his best known achievement may have been creating the concepts of the Metroid, Famicom Wars, and Kid Icarus universe.

== Works ==
Year	Title	Position
1975	Nintendo Beam Gun	Designer
1986	Metroid	Concept design, scenario
1986	Kid Icarus	Concept design
1988	Famicom Wars	Concept design
1989	Famicom Detective Club: The Girl Who Stands Behind	Supervisor
1991	Metroid II: Return of Samus	Designer
1992	Super Scope 6	Producer
1992	The Frog For Whom the Bell Tolls	Producer
1992	Super Mario Land 2: 6 Golden Coins	Designer
1992	Battle Clash	Director
1993	Mario & Wario	Producer
1994	Super Metroid	Producer
1995	Teleroboxer	Artwork
2000	Pokémon Stadium 2	Artwork

== Interviews ==
- Iwata Asks: Game & Watch Iwata Asks: Game & Watch - Development Staff Interview
