= Superscope =

Superscope may refer to:

- Marantz, high fidelity system owned by Superscope Inc.
- Superscope (song), a 2014 song and EP by Clark
- Superscope 235 or Super 35, a motion picture film format
- Super Scope, a wireless light gun controller for the Super NES video game console
