= Yuka Tsujiyoko =

Japanese composer

- 辻横 由佳
- Born: Yuka Bamba; Uji, Kyoto, Japan
- Education: Osaka Electro-Communication University
- Occupation: Composer
- Years active: 1990–present
- Musical career
- Genre: Video game
- Instrument: Piano

Yuka Tsujiyoko (辻横 由佳, Tsujiyoko Yuka; born Yuka Bamba) is a Japanese video game music composer. She is best known for her contributions to the Fire Emblem and Paper Mario series, and several other Intelligent Systems developed games. She also scored the Super Scope games Battle Clash, and its sequel Metal Combat: Falcon's Revenge.

Tsujiyoko was born in Uji, Kyoto Prefecture, Japan. She studied piano when she was in a preschool. She composed her first original composition when she was in high school as an assignment for her music class. Tsujiyoko attended Osaka Electro-Communication University, and she majored in electronic engineering. Before she joined Intelligent Systems, Tsujiyoko worked as a computer programmer for a software company. Tsujiyoko was inspired by Pat Metheny and Hirokazu Tanaka, with the latter being her mentor as he scored her first game project, Fire Emblem: Shadow Dragon and the Blade of Light.

== Works ==
Year	Title	Role
1990	Fire Emblem: Shadow Dragon and the Blade of Light	Music
1990	Backgammon	Music
1992	Fire Emblem Gaiden	Music
1992	Battle Clash	Music
1994	Fire Emblem: Mystery of the Emblem	Music
1994	Metal Combat: Falcon's Revenge	Music with Kenichi Nishimaki and Masaya Kuzume
1996	Fire Emblem: Genealogy of the Holy War	Music
1996	Tetris Attack (Game Boy)	Music with Masaru Tajima and Masaya Kuzume
1998	Super Famicom Wars	Sound assist
1999	Fire Emblem: Thracia 776	Music
2000	Paper Mario	Music
2002	Fire Emblem: The Binding Blade	Music
2002	Daisuki Teddy	Music
2003	Fire Emblem: The Blazing Blade	Music with Saki Haruyama
2004	Paper Mario: The Thousand-Year Door	Music with Yoshito Hirano
2004	Croket! Great Jikuu no Boukensha	Music
2004	Fire Emblem: The Sacred Stones	Sound supervisor
2005	Fire Emblem: Path of Radiance	Sound supervisor
2007	Fire Emblem: Radiant Dawn	Sound supervisor
2008	Super Smash Bros. Brawl	Arrangements (Note: "Wild Pokémon Battle! (Diamond / Pearl)", "Preparing to Advance")
2008	Fire Emblem: Shadow Dragon	Sound director
2010	Fire Emblem: New Mystery of the Emblem	Sound supervisor
2012	Fire Emblem Awakening	Sound supervisor
2014	Super Smash Bros. for Wii U	Arrangements (Note: "Route 23", "Meeting Theme Series Medley")
2015	Pokémon Picross	Music
2015	Fire Emblem Fates	Sound supervisor
2017	Fire Emblem Heroes	Sound supervisor
2017	Fire Emblem Echoes: Shadows of Valentia	Sound supervisor
2018	Super Smash Bros. Ultimate	Arrangements (Note: "Edge of Adversity", "Yūyūki Medley")
2019	Fire Emblem: Three Houses	Sound supervisor
2022	Sin Chronicle	"Far beyond..."
2023	Fire Emblem Engage	Sound supervisor
