= Yoshi (video game) =

1991 video game

- North American NES box art
- Developer: Game Freak
- Publisher: Nintendo
- Director: Satoshi Tajiri
- Producers: Shigeru Miyamoto; Tsunekazu Ishihara
- Designer: Satoshi Tajiri
- Artist: Ken Sugimori
- Composer: Junichi Masuda
- Series: Mario; Yoshi
- Platforms: Game Boy, Nintendo Entertainment System
- Release: NES: JP: December 14, 1991; NA: June 1992; UK: December 1992; Game Boy: JP: December 14, 1991; NA: July 10, 1992; EU: December 17, 1992
- Genre: Puzzle
- Modes: Single-player, multiplayer

Yoshi, (Note: Known in Japan as Yoshi no Tamago (Japanese: ヨッシーのたまご, Hepburn: Yosshī no Tamago; Yoshi's Egg)) known as Mario & Yoshi in PAL regions, is a 1991 puzzle video game developed by Game Freak and published by Nintendo for the Nintendo Entertainment System and Game Boy. Both versions were first released simultaneously in Japan on December 14, 1991, and released in all other regions the following year.

In Yoshi, the player is tasked with clearing monsters from the on-screen playing field. The monsters fall in from the top of the screen to build vertical stacks; the player must prevent a stack from growing too high such that it exits the play field. In order to do so, the player swaps and moves the stacks about such that falling monsters collide with identical monsters stationed atop the stacks, causing them to be removed from play. Yoshi offers both a scoring-focused single-player mode and a competitive two-player mode.

== Gameplay ==
The playing field is divided into four columns in which blocks fall from the top to the bottom.

Yoshi is a falling block game in which the player is given a playing field that is divided into four columns. The objective is to match Yoshi egg shells to hatch them and prevent the four stacks, which pile up from the falling monsters, from growing too tall. The player character, Mario, swaps the stacks around such that the falling monsters will be eliminated by coming into contact with the blocks they match.

Monsters, which consist of various Mario enemies, appear at the top of the screen and fall into each column, turning into blocks as they land and creating stacks that incrementally grow in height. The main objective is to prevent the four stacks from growing too high by eliminating blocks from the field; a game over occurs when any of the stacks cross the black line drawn across the top of the play field. A stack can hold up to eight objects in the NES version or seven in the Game Boy version.

To eliminate a block from the top of a stack, it must come in contact with a falling monster that matches it. For example, if a Goomba falls directly onto a Goomba block, both will be removed. The player controls Mario, who resides below the playing field and has the ability to swap the positions of any two adjacent stacks at a time. Thus, the player is required to switch around the stacks to ensure that the monsters fall into the correct places. Points are awarded for each set of monsters that are eliminated.

In addition to the four different types of monsters, two halves of a Yoshi eggshell will also fall. The bottom eggshell half behaves like a monster: it disappears when it comes into contact with another bottom half. However, if a falling top half comes into contact with a bottom half, the two will join and hatch a Yoshi, earning the player bonus points. Furthermore, if a stack of monsters grows atop a bottom half and a top half is then added, all monsters between the halves will be encased and eliminated. Larger Yoshi characters will hatch depending on the number of monsters encased, which also increases the number of bonus points awarded. If a falling top half does not have any bottom half to join to in the stack it touches, it is automatically removed and no points are awarded.

The single-player mode has two variations: A-Type and B-Type. In A-Type, the game is played indefinitely until the player receives a game over. In B-Type, the player plays a series of levels in which the player is required to completely clear the playing field of all the blocks. The initial number of blocks inside the playing field grows as the player progresses. In multiplayer mode, a second player controls Luigi. The two players play simultaneously in separate playing fields using the traditional rules. A player wins the match by clearing all the blocks in the field or when the other receives a game over; the first player to win three matches wins overall.

== Development ==
Yoshi was the first collaboration between developer Game Freak and publisher Nintendo. Nintendo had previously passed on publishing Game Freak's first title, Mendel Palace for the NES. After the smaller company incorporated and began work on its second release, Smart Ball for the SNES, Nintendo made Game Freak the offer to develop Yoshi. It was suggested by Tsunekazu Ishihara, an associate of Game Freak co-founder Satoshi Tajiri, that they develop smaller games like Yoshi in order to give the company the financial backing to eventually realize its larger-scale project, the RPG series Pokémon. Yoshi was developed in six months with Tajiri as its director. Ken Sugimori came up with the gameplay concept. Ishihara and Yoshi creator Shigeru Miyamoto served as producers. Tajiri explained that it was during the development of Yoshi that he learned the "wave" design of game difficulty in which the player is presented with an easy stage directly after a challenging one to allow them to savor their accomplishment. Junichi Masuda composed the game's music and sound. Masuda stated that he spent an extensive amount of time programming the movement of the game's menu items to its music. Game Freak had also wanted to add in a realistic-sounding Yoshi voice, but Nintendo disapproved of it. In 2024, a prototype of an unreleased Nintendo DS remake was discovered as part of the October 2024 Game Freak leak, hidden in the source code of Pokémon Black and White; evidence led some to believe that the prototype may have been based on an unreleased Super Famicom version.

== Release ==
Yoshi was released in Japan for the Famicom and Game Boy on December 14, 1991.

The NES version of Yoshi was made available for purchase on the Virtual Console for the Wii in 2007. The game was then re-released on September 1, 2011, as a downloadable title on the Nintendo 3DS, available only to members of the Nintendo Ambassador program. Yoshi was made available for purchase in the Nintendo eShop on August 22, 2012, in Japan, on February 21, 2013, in North America and on May 2, 2013, in Europe. It was also released for the Wii U on June 12, 2013, as the part of the 30th anniversary of the Famicom with the price of 30 cents which become the regular price starting on July 12, 2013. The NES version was also re-released via the Nintendo Classics service on September 18, 2018. The Game Boy version was also re-released on the Nintendo Classics service on February 4, 2026.

== Reception ==
Contemporary reception

Review scores
Publication	Score
Famitsu	6/10, 7/10, 6/10, 5/10 (NES); 6/10, 7/10, 4/10, 3/10 (GB)
Game Zone	65/100 (NES)
N-Force	4/5

=== Contemporary ===
Yoshi sold 500,000 copies in Japan on its first day on sale. In the United States, the game topped Babbage's NES sales charts for two months in 1992, from August to September. In the United Kingdom, the Game Boy version still sold 100,000 copies in 1997, years after release.

Upon release, the game received a positive review from the Europress gaming magazine N-Force, which stated in a preview for the game in its September 1992 issue that "basically [the game] is great. The fun of Tetris, but with colour and sound effects. Just as hard, maybe harder – definitely just as addictive." It later rated the game 4 out of 5 in the Buyers' Guide for its January 1993 issue, summarizing that "Yoshi is great fun. Gameplay's nothing new – Tetris all over again! Graphics are a treat. Lots of fun – in short bursts."

Game Zone described the game as being "Tetris for under sevens" saying that while Tetris required a relatively high degree of skill involved, Yoshi's gameplay was more involved with luck and stamina.

=== Retrospective ===
Retrospective reception

Review scores
Publication	Score	
Publication	NES	Wii
AllGame	2.5/5	
GameSpot		5/10
IGN		5/10
Nintendo Life		4/10

Yoshi received mixed reviews from retrospective critics, with common criticism directed towards its perceived repetitive gameplay and dependence on luck, which led to insufficient replay value. Brett Alan Weiss of Allgame called Yoshi a "surprisingly dull game," noting that while the game's controls are unique, "the novelty wears off after a while."

Reviews of Yoshi's Virtual Console release on Wii in 2007 were also mixed. Both Frank Provo of GameSpot and Lucas M. Thomas of IGN rated Yoshi 5 out of 10. Thomas regarded the gameplay as "slow" and the controls "cumbersome," and concluded that the game is a "beginner's puzzler, holding little appeal for experienced players". While Provo complimented both the game's graphics and music, he stated that the gameplay did not involve much strategy, inciting little reason to play more than a few minutes. Nintendo Life felt that Yoshi was "uninspired", rating the game 4 out of 10.

Several websites that covered recent Virtual Console releases recommended that players refrain from purchasing Yoshi. Nintendo World Report stated that "there's too much luck and chance in the game to make playing it satisfying," and Joystiq also stated that "while [the gameplay is] admittedly a pretty interesting way to spend an afternoon, it still feels like kind of a ripoff." Jeremy Parish of 1UP.com stated that the gameplay in Yoshi was "not enough to justify the asking price [of 500 points]," though he opined that, compared to Yoshi's Cookie which he considered "uninspired", Yoshi was "decent" and claimed it "actually had some relationship to the Mario series." Hardcore Gaming 101 considered Yoshi the weakest Nintendo puzzle game out of Dr. Mario and Yoshi's Cookie, deeming that it "is far lacking in challenge and catchiness" compared to them.
