= Mario & Wario =

1993 video game

- Developer: Game Freak
- Publisher: Nintendo
- Director: Satoshi Tajiri
- Producers: Makoto Kano; Tsunekazu Ishihara
- Designer: Satoshi Tajiri
- Programmers: Michiharu Nishihashi; Junichi Masuda
- Artists: Ken Sugimori; Motofumi Fujiwara
- Composer: Junichi Masuda
- Series: Mario; Wario
- Platform: Super Famicom
- Release: JP: August 27, 1993
- Genre: Puzzle-platform
- Mode: Single-player

Mario & Wario (Note: Japanese: マリオとワリオ, Hepburn: Mario to Wario) is a 1993 puzzle-platform game developed by Game Freak and published by Nintendo for the Super Famicom. The game requires the Super Famicom Mouse accessory to play. Despite being a Japanese-only release, the game is entirely in English.

The gameplay of Mario & Wario focuses on guiding Mario, who has various objects placed atop his head by his self-declared arch rival Wario, through a series of levels consisting of various obstacles and traps. Because Mario has been rendered sightless and is constantly in danger of walking into hazards, the player controls the fairy Wanda, who can protect Mario by changing the environment around him as he moves towards the levels' end. The game offers a total of 100 levels and offers three playable characters.

== Gameplay ==
A player controls Wanda to turn box outlines into blocks in an effort to help Mario reach for the "Goal", where Luigi is standing.

Mario & Wario focuses on Mario, who has various objects, including buckets and vases, dropped onto his head from an airplane by the antagonist Wario. Because the objects render Mario sightless, it is the main goal of the player to guide Mario through each level, which consist of various obstacles and traps, to his brother Luigi, who can remove the offending object. The player must also complete each level within a specified time limit. Because Mario will constantly walk left or right regardless of any oncoming hazards, the player controls the fairy Wanda, who possesses the ability to manipulate the environment in order to protect Mario.

Wanda is controlled via a point-and-click interface with the Super Famicom Mouse accessory, influencing objects on the screen when clicked. For example, Wanda can solidify block outlines for use as barriers or bridges for Mario to walk across, and can destroy certain obstacles and enemies. The player can also click Mario to turn him around and reverse his direction. The player is awarded points for defeating enemies, collecting items, and for any remaining time when the level is completed. Extra lives may also be awarded.

Mario & Wario contains a total of 100 levels allotted amongst ten unique locales, which include forest, desert, and underwater settings, each with a different offering of enemies or hazards. In addition to Mario, the player can select Princess Peach or Yoshi to be the character that is guided through each level. Princess Peach walks slower than Mario and Yoshi walks faster, which may offer advantages or disadvantages depending on how difficult a particular level is or how fast the player seeks to complete it. At the end of each locale, Wanda directly battles Wario with the player character looking on, attacking his plane and earning coins from it until he is burnt and flees. After the final level is completed, the player character gives Wario chase by plane and drops a barrel on his head, causing him to crash and foiling his plans.

== Development and release ==
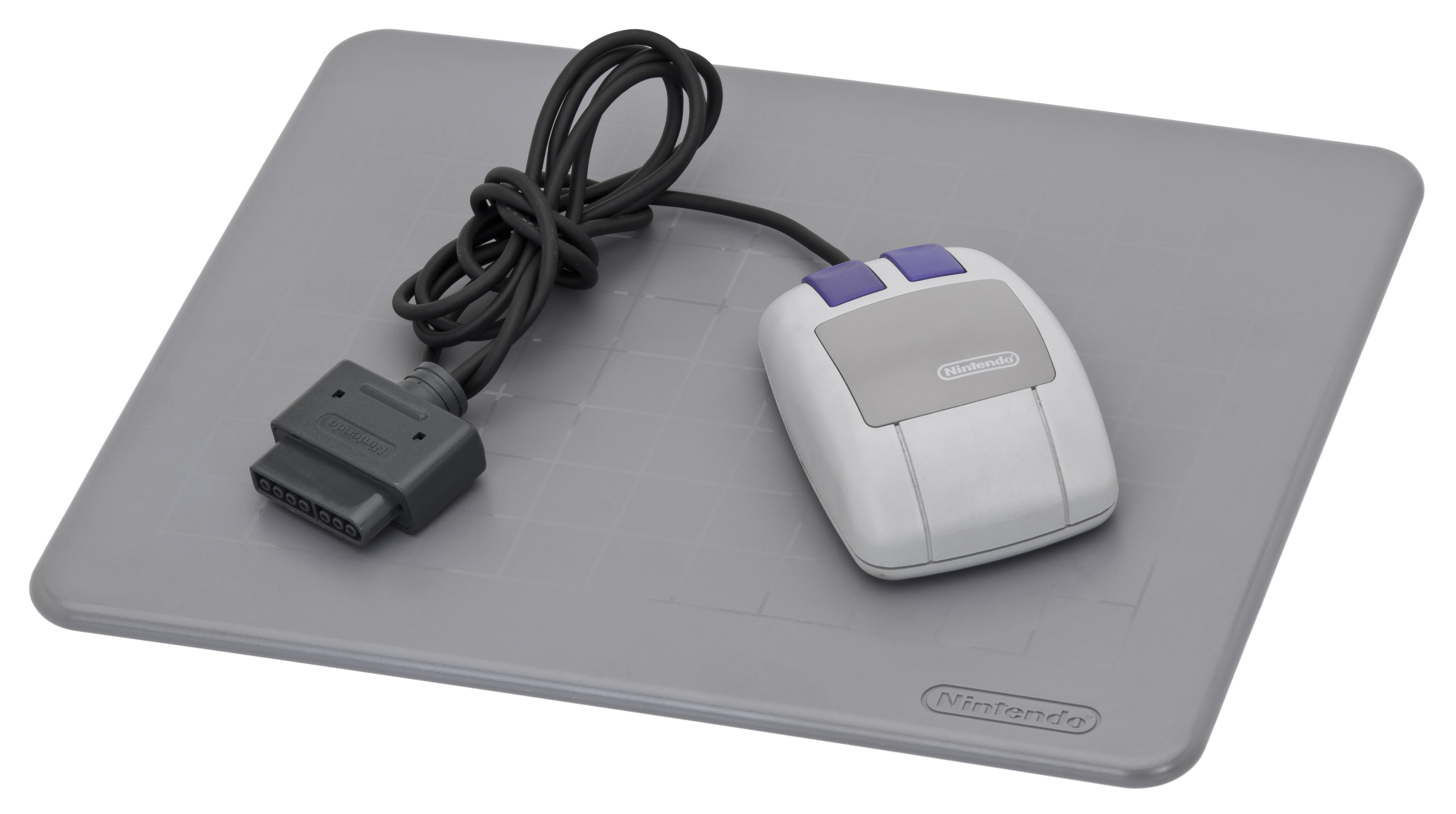
Controls for Mario & Wario were changed from the Super Scope to the Super Famicom Mouse during development.

Mario & Wario was designed by Pokémon creator Satoshi Tajiri and developed by Game Freak. The developer's co-founder Junichi Masuda was the game's music composer and one of its programmers. According to Masuda, an early version of the game involved catching monsters by shooting out a net using the Super Scope. However, the team had difficulty getting the peripheral to recognize the tops and bottoms of television screens, most of which were generally small at the time. Control was then switched to the Super Famicom Mouse.

The game was released for the Super Famicom in Japan on August 27, 1993. It is one of only two games on the system that require the mouse for play, alongside Mario Paint. The game received its first re-release and first western release on October 9, 2025, via the Nintendo Classics service.

== Reception and legacy ==
Reception

Review scores
Publication	Score
AllGame	4/5
Famitsu	7/10, 8/10, 7/10, 7/10
GameZone	76/100
Joypad	81%
Official Nintendo Magazine	81/100
Super Play	70%
Total!	62%
The Super Famicom	78/100
Super Pro	68/100

In the Japanese magazine Famitsu, the four reviewers all found the game to be a variation of Lemmings (1991). Two reviewers commented on the difficulty with one finding it well balanced, another finding it grew hectic a few levels in, and a third stating it was relatively easy as there was not much the player could do with the fairy. One reviewer found the game had well thought level design, another commented that they wish the entire game play area was displayed on the screen following the first few areas. Two reviewers disliked the controls, describing it as frustrating and they had to double-click too many times. One reviewer found it a must play for fans of the action puzzle games, another said it did not give them the "pleasant form of mental exhaustion" that similar works in the past had such as Lemmings or Lode Runner (1983).

Jon Thompson of Allgame praised the colorful graphics and calling the gameplay "entertaining, being fast-paced enough to keep you constantly busy, without resorting to being fast and nearly impossible more than a couple of times".

Mario & Wario was referenced in other Nintendo games. The Game Boy role-playing game Pokémon Red and Blue, also developed by Game Freak, alludes to the game: checking the Super NES belonging to a non-playable character displays the message "A game with MARIO wearing a bucket on his head!" This reference returns in Pokémon FireRed and LeafGreen. The bucket used to obscure Mario's vision appears as a collectible item in Kirby Super Star and as a trophy in Super Smash Bros. Melee.
