= Playtronic =

Brazilian video game company

Playtronic Industrial Ltda.
- Company type: Joint venture
- Industry: Toys; Video games
- Founded: 15 March 1993; 33 years ago
- Founders: Eugênio Staub (Gradiente); Mario Adler (Estrela)
- Fate: Merged with Gradiente (1996)
- Headquarters: Rio de Janeiro, Brazil
- Products: 2-XL, NES, SNES, Game Boy, Virtual Boy, Nintendo 64
- Owner: Leandro Mattos
- Website: http://www.playtronicgames.com.br/

Playtronic Industrial Ltda. is a Brazilian video game company. Its original iteration was also a toy manufacturer and was based in Manaus, Brazil, and was a joint venture between companies Gradiente Industrial S.A. (consumer electronics company) and Manufatura de Brinquedos Estrela S.A. (toy manufacturer). The company was founded on March 15, 1993, by the CEOs Eugênio Staub, from Estrela, and Mario Adler, from Gradiente. The initial business was assembling Nintendo products outside Japan for the Brazilian market, competing directly with Tec Toy, the Sega representative in the country. Since 2016, Playtronic has been developing games for Android and Xbox.

== History ==
The announcement of the fusion attained great attention on the media, considering that Playtronic was the first company in the world to produce Nintendo products outside Japan. Shortly thereafter, the Super Nintendo Entertainment System was the first console to be announced and then produced already on August 24, 1993, adapted to the Brazilian's PAL-M analog TV system and bundled as Control Set (with one controller) and Super Set (with two controllers and the Super Mario World Game Pak) versions. The initial distribution included the Super Scope light gun and 12 games shipped and later sold separately. Even with the late release, the success of its sales snapped up 60% from the 16-bit video game consoles local segment in April, 1995.

The Nintendo Entertainment System was the next console to be produced. But even after the start of the sales, the Brazilian market has been dominated for a long time by smuggled (from China and Taiwan) and local famiclones — one of the most successful being the Phantom System, manufactured by Gradiente itself. Due to this fact, the quite late launch and the high prices of Nintendo's licensed products, the sales were very weak. The famiclones and Tec Toy's Master System were still the best selling 8-bit video game consoles in the country.

Until its final year of 1996, Playtronic also brought the Game Boy, Virtual Boy and Nintendo 64 to the Brazilian market. But due to a long time cash flow problem, Estrela sold 50% of its equity participation in Playtronic to Gradiente for $7.3 million, ending the joint venture. After that, the Gradiente Entertainment Ltda. was the division created to succeed the Nintendo's local representation until 2003, when it left the video games business due to several factors, including the high dollar exchange rate, reduction of average household income and high diffusion of piracy in Brazil.

== Playtronic today ==
After 10 years of complete abandonment, Playtronic was acquired in 2013 by programmer Leandro Mattos, with the aim of preventing the Brazilian people from forgetting the brand. In 2016, he began developing his own games for Android and in 2024 began production of games for Xbox.

== Games ==
Playtronic distributes its electronic games exclusively on its own website, on Google Play and Xbox.
