= Fire Emblem Echoes: Shadows of Valentia =

2017 video game for the Nintendo 3DS

- Box art featuring dual protagonists Alm and Celica
- Developer: Intelligent Systems
- Publisher: Nintendo
- Directors: Toshiyuki Kusakihara; Kenta Nakanishi; Genki Yokota
- Producers: Masahiro Higuchi; Hitoshi Yamagami
- Designers: Naohiro Yasuhara; Ryuichiro Kouguchi
- Programmer: Susumu Ishihara
- Artists: Hidari; Akio Shimada
- Writer: Satoko Kurihara
- Composers: Takeru Kanazaki; Yasuhisa Baba; Takafumi Wada; Sho Murakami
- Series: Fire Emblem
- Platform: Nintendo 3DS
- Release: JP: April 20, 2017; NA/EU: May 19, 2017; AU: May 20, 2017
- Genre: Tactical role-playing
- Mode: Single-player

Fire Emblem Echoes: Shadows of Valentia (Note: Known in Japan as Fire Emblem Echoes: Another Hero King (Japanese: ファイアーエムブレム エコーズ もうひとりの英雄王, Hepburn: Faiā Emuburemu Ekōzu: Mō Hitori no Eiyū-ō)) is a tactical role-playing video game developed by Intelligent Systems and published by Nintendo for the Nintendo 3DS in 2017. It is the fifteenth installment in the Fire Emblem series (Note: Sources disagree on the exact numbering: it is variously called the fifteenth including remakes and sixteenth including remakes and Fire Emblem Heroes.) and a remake of the 1992 Famicom game Fire Emblem Gaiden, the second entry in the series. It follows dual protagonists Alm and Celica as they aim to bring an end to the war through opposite methods, with Alm fighting to resolve the war through battle, while Celica attempts to find a peaceful end through guidance from the Goddess Mila. Fire Emblem Echoes carries over the core gameplay mechanics of the Fire Emblem series while incorporating mechanics from Gaiden, like dungeon crawling.

Development of Fire Emblem Echoes began in 2015 following the completion of Fire Emblem Fates. Intended as the culmination of the Fire Emblem series on the 3DS platform, several staff members from both Fates and Fire Emblem Awakening were involved. The game carried over the unconventional mechanics of Gaiden while expanding and rebuilding the story and gameplay based on recent Fire Emblem games and the team's wishes for added role-playing elements. While Gaiden remains exclusive to Japan, Fire Emblem Echoes was localized by 8-4. The game was commercially successful, selling over one million copies, and received generally positive reviews from critics for its story, unique gameplay additions and high quality of its full voice acting, with criticism focusing on its archaic elements, like the map design, and the lack of some features from Awakening and Fates.

== Gameplay ==
Screenshot of a battle in Fire Emblem Echoes, showing a player unit attacking an enemy unit. The basic mechanics of the battle system are all displayed.

Fire Emblem Echoes: Shadows of Valentia is a tactical role-playing game in which players command two armies on opposite sides of a war on the continent of Valentia. There are two difficulty settings (Normal and Hard) and two modes that dictate the fate of characters that fall in battle. In Classic Mode, a fallen unit is subject to permanent death, a recurring mode in the Fire Emblem series that removes fallen characters from the rest of the game (though it is possible in Echoes to revive fallen units a limited number of times). Casual Mode enables units to be revived at the end of a battle. The player navigates Valentia using a world map, going to different story-based and optional locations. Environments are split between battle maps similar to earlier Fire Emblem games, towns which can be explored to find friendly non-playable characters who run shops, and dungeons that the player can explore. Encountering an enemy on the world map or in dungeons will trigger a battle.

As with other Fire Emblem games, Fire Emblem Echoes uses a turn-based system where each unit on both sides is given their chance to move and act. Battles take place on a grid-based battlefield, with turns being given for players and enemies. During an attack, the view transitions from a top-down perspective to a third-person view. Unlike many other Fire Emblem games, the Weapon Triangle (a rock–paper–scissors system where certain weapons have advantages over others) and limited weapon durability are removed. Units instead have standard weapons that last the whole campaign, and they can be given special weapons which replace their standard weapon and grant passive advantages. Each unit can only carry one weapon, which can unlock special Combat Arts as its wielder gains experience points and levels up through battle. Combat Arts are weapon-specific special moves that can range from higher-damaging attacks to supportive abilities like swapping places with another unit. Each unit is assigned a unique character class, with the class dictating their weapon and consequently their actions; archers can attack at a distance, melee fighters are limited to close-range attacks, while mages must sacrifice a portion of their health to perform an action. Once a unit has reached a certain level, their class can be evolved into more powerful versions. Villager NPCs can also be recruited in towns; while initially weak, they can be strengthened and assigned any available character class.

Each time a unit is used in a battle in dungeons, their Fatigue meter is filled and their maximum health is decreased. The meter is depleted by either giving that unit gifts or purifying them at special statues found at the end of the dungeon. During battles, adjacent allied units can engage in support conversations, dialogue exchanges which impact their relationship and gameplay performance. In dungeons, players can roam freely through a 3D environment with a party of ten, are able to avoid encounters if they wish, and can smash objects or open crates to obtain money and items. Upon engaging an enemy, the perspective switches to the standard top-down battle screen. A brand new feature introduced to the series is Mila's Turnwheel, a mechanic whereby players can rewind turns with limited uses to redo moves if they so choose, from as little as one character's movement to as far back as the beginning of the battle. In addition, Fire Emblem Echoes features Amiibo support, with two of the compatible figurines being main protagonists Alm and Celica, in addition to characters from earlier Fire Emblem games: using an Amiibo summons a phantom unit for a single turn at the cost of a character's health. Amiibo not related to the Fire Emblem series summon allied monsters, and the Alm and Celica Amiibo can be used outside of battle to unlock special exclusive dungeons.

== Synopsis ==
The main storyline remains the same as in Fire Emblem Gaiden. Long ago, the sibling gods Mila and Duma fought for control over the continent of Valentia. Eventually, they called a ceasefire and each took half of the continent. In the south, Mila's worshippers would form the Kingdom of Zofia, a land of plentiful bounty. Over time, however, it spoiled and corrupted its people through complacency. In the north, Duma's worshippers created the Empire of Rigel, a desolate land whose people grew in strength but also became numb to emotion. The game follows Alm and Celica, childhood friends who set off on their own journeys across Valentia in order to restore peace.

After the completion of the game, a new post-game chapter can be started which allows Alm, Celica, and their allies to journey across the sea to Archanea, the setting of the original Fire Emblem. While there, a large labyrinth buried in the nearby desert can be discovered. Exploring its depths, various stone tables speak of an alchemist named Forneus who attempted to create the perfect life-form with divine dragon blood as well as reanimating the dead to be subservient, but was sealed within the labyrinth as punishment for his inhumane experiments. At the deepest level, Forneus' "perfect life-form" is encountered: a monstrous being dubbed "The Creation" which serves as the final boss of the labyrinth and is heavily implied to be Grima, the main antagonist of Fire Emblem Awakening.

== Development ==
Fire Emblem Echoes is a complete remake of Fire Emblem Gaiden. The second entry in the Fire Emblem series, Gaiden was released in 1992 for the Famicom. The game was notable for breaking away from the gameplay precedents set in its predecessor, Shadow Dragon and the Blade of Light; while it retained that game's tactical turn-based battle system, it included new features, such as navigable towns and overworld akin to a traditional RPG, and simplified mechanics. Due to these changes, Gaiden came to be considered the "black sheep" of the series, with many of its new elements being dropped for subsequent entries. Like its predecessor, Gaiden did not receive a Western release. Development for Echoes began following the completion of Fire Emblem Fates for the Nintendo 3DS in 2015. Nintendo series producer Hitoshi Yamagami thought about developing a Fire Emblem game for the Nintendo Switch home console, but considered it was too early as the console's specifications were still being decided upon. Several Intelligent Systems staff said they wanted to implement features that had to be cut from Fates in a remake of Gaiden. As Gaiden has received little attention up to this point, Yamagami thought they could quickly develop a remake and release it before the Switch's release. An alternative plan was creating an all-new game, but early planning was already in place for the planned Fire Emblem game for Nintendo Switch, so it was considered too late to begin a third original 3DS game. It was initially scheduled for release in September 2016, but they could not reach this deadline without compromising the game's quality, so the release was revised into 2017.

Nintendo staff member Kenta Nakanishi — who was a lifelong fan of Fire Emblem and particularly Gaiden — came on board as a sub-director of Fates, Genki Yokota, was busy with another project. The director for Intelligent Systems was Toshiyuki Kusakihara, who had acted as art director for Fates and its predecessor Fire Emblem Awakening—he took up the role due to his sympathetic understanding Gaiden's unconventional gameplay. Rather than calling it "New Gaiden", the team chose the English word "Echoes" to give it worldwide appeal, enable its differentiation from the other side story projects within the Fire Emblem series, and as the potential branding for a new series of remakes. Echoes was intended to be the culmination of the Fire Emblem series on the 3DS. The characters were redesigned by Hidari, who was chosen due to Kusakihara's frequent praising for his work. Kusakihara had tried to hire Hidari to work on both Awakening and the Fire Emblem trading card game, though he was too busy with other projects. For Echoes, however, a meeting was set up well in advance and Hidari was able to accept. Hidari's first character design was Alm; he underwent four redesigns, which enabled Hidari to get a handle on the game's artstyle and design the rest of the cast on his own. The game features animated cutscenes by Studio Khara.

According to Nakanishi and Kusakihara, the original story had been underdeveloped compared to later Fire Emblem games; the remake enabled them to redesign the narrative to suit the tastes of modern Fire Emblem players. The story of Gaiden was expanded significantly with the inclusion of the core conflict between the two nations that was previously confined to the original version's manual, and cast the character Saber in the role of narrator so as not to limit the scope of the story. Another issue they wanted to address was the original game's poor character writing. The theme of royalty and its impact on the characters was one of the story's new elements. To further emphasize the theme, the characters Berkut and Rinea were introduced, who expanded upon the original themes of duality by acting as opposites to Alm and Celica. Berkut was designed as a foil for Alm, with the latter's common roots contrasting with Berkut's royal lineage. Additionally, the new character Faye was added to Alm's army to add another female character and to add unpredictability for new and returning players. The characters also underwent both subtle and grand alterations, such as Celica being made of royal blood. The team decided to focus on original protagonists Alm and Celica rather than incorporating an avatar as had been done for Awakening and Fates. The sibling relationship and their positions in separate rebellious factions was what had originally drawn Nakanishi back towards the game.

The gameplay was rebuilt from the ground up based on the technology developed for Awakening and Fates, with its redesign being seen as a necessity with remaking the story due to the original version's "obtuse" mechanics. Rather than bring the game more in line with the rest of the Fire Emblem series, they preserved the role-playing elements and combined them with more recent Fire Emblem mechanics. The free roaming ability had been developed for Fates, but quality concerns led it to being cut. As Gaiden had this feature originally, free roaming was considered by the staff of Echoes to be a "perfect" match. It was also decided to lower the difficulty when compared to the original, allowing both series veterans and newcomers to enjoy the game. While the team considered adding the Weapon Triangle, it would have required adding more characters or altering the original cast, going against the team's intentions. The Marriage system—a mechanic from Awakening and Fates that allowed for the creation of child characters with new storylines and inherited statistics—was similarly not included as it would have disrupted established character relations too much. Despite this, the series' established Support system was added to properly flesh out characters.

=== Music ===
The game's music was composed and arranged primarily by Takeru Kanazaki, who had co-composed the music for Fates. Kanazaki had assistance from Intelligent Systems composers Yasuhisa Baba and Shoh Murakami; and anime composer Takafumi Wada of Dimension Cruise, who also handled mixing and editing. The composer for the past few entries, Hiroki Morishita, was not involved with the project due to his commitment to scoring Fire Emblem Heroes. The official soundtrack was released by Japanese music label Symphony No. 5 on October 25, 2017. It covered five discs of music, with the fifth being a data disc. The team used the original game's music, composed by Yuka Tsujiyoko, as a starting point for their work. The team attempted to incorporate as many live instruments as possible into the soundtrack. The lyrics for all songs were written by Kusakihara. The vocal ending theme was "The Heritors of Arcadia". With lyrics written by Kusakihara, the song was performed by Japanese singer Janis Crunch. The song was written from the dragon Mila's point of view, describing the passing on of responsibilities to humanity. The English version was performed by Bonnie Gordon, who also voiced the character Silque. She became the singer purely by chance, and was worried by the number of high notes in the song due to her low singing voice.

== Release ==
The game was first announced in January 2017 during a Nintendo Direct broadcast dedicated to the Fire Emblem series. In Japan, multiple versions of the game were released; in addition to the standard release, there was also a limited edition with a special soundtrack, and a "Valentia Complete" edition featuring the contents of the limited edition with added items, including an artbook. The game was released in Japan on April 20, 2017; in North America and Europe on May 19; and in Australasia on May 20. Amiibo figures of the game's protagonists Alm and Celica were released alongside the game. The game features full voice acting—a first for the Fire Emblem series—for all but minor characters, but the English release does not include dual audio unlike Awakening. The game's localization was handled by 8-4, who previously worked on Awakening and the 2008 Nintendo DS installment Fire Emblem: Shadow Dragon.

Post-release, five downloadable content (DLC) packs were released over the following two months alongside smaller free DLC, with a Season Pass giving access to all five packs at a reduced price. The DLC packs were split between new dungeons and maps with exclusive character classes, a prologue to the main narrative, and a collaborative character pack with the trading card game Fire Emblem Cipher.

== Reception ==
Reception

Aggregate scores
Aggregator	Score
Metacritic	81/100
OpenCritic	84% recommend

Review scores
Publication	Score
Destructoid	7.5/10
Electronic Gaming Monthly	8.5/10
Famitsu	37/40
Game Informer	7/10
GameRevolution	4.5/5
GameSpot	9/10
GamesRadar+	4/5
IGN	7.8/10
Nintendo Life	9/10
Nintendo World Report	9/10

The game received “generally favorable reviews” from review aggregator website Metacritic, having a score of 81/100. Japanese gaming journal Famitsu praised the voice acting and more action-oriented story scenes, saying it made the story more entertaining and dramatic. Chris Carter, writing for Destructoid, enjoyed the grand scope and grounded nature of the narrative despite a weaker cast than previous Fire Emblem games. Ray Carsillo of Electronic Gaming Monthly called the narrative "your typical Fire Emblem tale of kings, queens, dragons, and magic", while Game Informer's Javy Gwaltney said that the narrative and its leads Alm and Celica were the main reason he continued playing the game. Griffin Vacheron of GameRevolution praised the story's emulation of popular visual novel games such as Danganronpa and enjoyed both the writing and localization. GameSpot's Heidi Kemps praised the balance between dialogue and combat when portraying the characters, and Chris Schilling of GamesRadar enjoyed the narrative and singled out Celica's storyline as the better part of the game. Meghan Sullivan of IGN, while noting the game's very familiar premise, said that the overall story "makes for a good soap opera". Nintendo Life's Morgan Sleeper enjoyed the simplified storyline after the complex structure of Fates, while Daan Koopman of Nintendo World Report admired its scope and the dynamic between the two protagonists' contrasting views on the war.

Famitsu positively noted the general presentation and its impact on the experience, while Carsillo praised the full-motion cutscenes and character portraits. Gwaltney enjoyed cutscenes and battle animations while finding character models "a bit fuzzy". Vacheron lauded the quality of cutscenes and its visual style, while he positively compared to visual novels. Schilling found the subdued color palette and felt that the graphics were created with a lower budget than earlier games, while Sullivan cited the cutscenes as being "well-made". Sleeper praised the graphical variety and the opportunities to see environmental details, and Koopman felt that its visuals were the game's greatest improvement over earlier 3DS games. The voice acting also received general praise for its quality and scope, (Note: Electronic Gaming Monthly, GamesRadar, GameRevolution, GameSpot, Nintendo Life, Nintendo World Report) with the exception of Carter who found it uneven.

Famitsu praised the gameplay for both introducing new elements and updating the mechanics of Gaiden, saying it helped elevate the game above its previous black sheep status. Carter enjoyed the gameplay flow despite finding some of the mechanics underdeveloped. while Carsillo enjoyed combat but noted a lack of variation in victory conditions. Gwaltney mentioned several points where the difficulty became unfair and compromised the more enjoyable elements of battles, and Vacheron found the older mechanics had been successfully retooled to feel satisfying to use. Kemps enjoyed the gameplay and new additions such as Mila's Turnwheel despite the requirement for grinding to progress past difficult battles, and Schilling praised the gameplay refinements while pointing out its weak map design. Sullivan adjusted to the old-fashioned mechanics and found them enjoyable after the initial shock, praising their implementation but noting several unfair difficulty spikes. Sleeper praised much of the map design and enjoyed how the additional systems expanded the game's combat and tactical options. Koopman positively noted the various key parts of the gameplay elements, calling the combat and exploration segments one of the reasons the game stood out in the Fire Emblem series as a whole. The new dungeon crawling segments were generally praised by critics, (Note: Destructoid, Electronic Gaming Monthly, Famitsu, GameSpot, IGN, Nintendo Life, Nintendo World Report) although Vacheron found them lacking in substance. The omission of the series's recurring Weapon Triangle mechanic also raised comments, with several noting that players would take time to get used to it after experiencing the likes of Awakening. (Note: Destructoid, Electronic Gaming Monthly, GameSpot, IGN)

=== Sales ===
During its first week on sale in Japan, Fire Emblem Echoes sold 135,195 units, topping gaming charts and selling through 80% of its initial shipment. Not even a full week into its release, Fire Emblem Echoes became number one on Japan's sale charts. Beating out its 2nd place competitor by 83,526 more copies sold. Upon its debut in the United Kingdom, the game was fifth in the all-format gaming charts. In Australia and New Zealand, the game was second in the all platform gaming charts, and topped 3DS charts. In North America, Fire Emblem Echoes reached seventh place in the all-format gaming charts. According to the NPD Group, the release of Fire Emblem Echoes prompted a rise in portable console sales. In their quarterly financial report, Nintendo stated that Fire Emblem Echoes had been a popular game during the period. As of December 31, 2022, Fire Emblem Echoes has sold 1 million copies worldwide.

=== Accolades ===
Shadows of Valentia was nominated for "Best 3DS Game" in IGN's Best of 2017 Awards. It was also nominated for "Handheld Game of the Year" at the 21st Annual D.I.C.E. Awards, and for "Original Dramatic Score, Franchise" at the 17th Annual National Academy of Video Game Trade Reviewers Awards.

== Legacy ==
Several characters from Echoes were added as playable units in the mobile game Fire Emblem Heroes in early 2017 to commemorate the game's initial launch. Celica was also added as a playable character in the hack and slash spinoff Fire Emblem Warriors. Four music tracks taken directly from Echoes are featured in the 2018 crossover fighting game Super Smash Bros. Ultimate, along with collectable Spirit artwork of Alm, Celica, and the three Pegasus Sisters: Palla, Catria, and Est. Two gameplay mechanics first introduced in Echoes, being Combat Arts and the ability to rewind time in the middle of battles, went on to be incorporated in the next mainline installment, Fire Emblem: Three Houses for the Nintendo Switch. Additionally, the Alm and Celica Amiibo figures can be scanned into Three Houses to unlock music tracks for use in optional battles.
