= Metal Combat: Falcon's Revenge =

1993 video game

- North American box art by Stephen Peringer
- Developer: Intelligent Systems
- Publisher: Nintendo
- Director: Toshitaka Muramatsu
- Producer: Gunpei Yokoi
- Programmers: Shinya Yamamoto; Toshihiro Nishii
- Artist: Toshitaka Muramatsu
- Composer: Yuka Tsujiyoko
- Platform: Super Nintendo Entertainment System
- Release: NA: December 1993; EU: May 1994
- Genre: Light-gun shooter
- Modes: Single-player, multiplayer

Metal Combat: Falcon's Revenge is a 1993 light gun shooter video game developed by Intelligent Systems and published by Nintendo for the Super Nintendo Entertainment System. It is the sequel to Battle Clash (1992) and one of a small number of titles that require the Super Scope, a light gun. Taking place three years after the events of its predecessor, the player acts as the gunner of the Standing Tank (ST) Falcon piloted by Mike Anderson, fighting a group of chiefs in the Battle Game, the returning emperor Anubis, and the invading Eltorian alien race.

Metal Combat was created by Team Battle Clash, a group within Intelligent Systems made up of Nintendo R&D1 staff, which previously worked on Battle Clash. It was directed by chief graphic designer Toshitaka Muramatsu, who worked in the Fire Emblem and Paper Mario series, and produced by Gunpei Yokoi. The music was composed by Yuka Tsujiyoko, who also scored Battle Clash. The game garnered generally favorable reception from critics; praise was given to the refined gameplay, different strategies of each enemy, variety of modes, and overall improvements made over its predecessor. Some reviewers criticized the single-player campaign for its short duration, repetitive action, and difficulty.

== Gameplay ==
Internal view of the ST Falcon, battling against the ST Cobra on Saturn

Like its predecessor, Metal Combat: Falcon's Revenge is a light-gun shooter game which requires the Super Scope, a light gun peripheral for the Super Nintendo Entertainment System, to be played. The plot takes place three years after the events occurred in Battle Clash; the emperor Anubis suffered defeat at the hands of Mike Anderson and a new age of prosperity began to emerge on Earth. However, Anubis returned to resume his tyranny and an alien race called the Eltorians entered the Solar System to conquer Earth.

Gameplay consists of four different modes divided into single-player or multiplayer submenus: Battle, Time Trial, Training, and Combat. Battle is a single-player scenario where the player acts as the gunner of the Standing Tank (ST) Falcon piloted by Anderson, fighting a group of chiefs in the Battle Game, the returning emperor Anubis, and the invading Eltorian alien race in one-on-one duels. Time Trial is a mode where the player must defeat enemies to achieve the best time possible. Training is a tutorial mode, in which an instructor named Rola helps beginners through a series of seven lessons. Combat is a versus mode, where one player controls the ST Falcon using the Super Scope while the other player controls one of the enemy STs using a Super NES controller.

The player attacks enemies using rapid fire by holding down the fire button, energy bolts, bombs, and an array of special items. The ST Falcon charges energy bolts up to three times when the player is not firing and fires a treble shot once the power meters are filled. The player counters enemy fire by intercepting their projectiles, though some enemy attacks can only be deflected by shooting energy bolts. Each enemy ST has destructible weak points that the player must shoot to deal damage. Completing the single-player mode unlocks the ST Tornado, piloted by Carol Eugene. The ST Tornado can store up to ten energy beams and fire each one individually but has less defense compared to the ST Falcon.

== Development and release ==
Metal Combat: Falcon's Revenge was created by Team Battle Clash, a group within Intelligent Systems made up of Nintendo R&D1 staff that developed games for the Super Scope light gun, which had previously worked on Battle Clash (1992). The game is one of six titles that requires the Super Scope. It was directed by chief graphic designer Toshitaka Muramatsu, who worked in the Fire Emblem and Paper Mario series, and produced by Gunpei Yokoi. Shinya Yamamoto and Toshihiro Nishii acted as two of the game's co-programmers, who later worked on Tetris Attack. (Note: Known in Japan as Panel de Pon (パネルでポン, Paneru de Pon)) The music was scored by Yuka Tsujiyoko, who also composed Battle Clash.

The game was unveiled at the 1994 Summer Consumer Electronics Show (CES) under its original title, Battle Clash II, but the name was changed shortly before its North American release. Nintendo first published Metal Combat: Falcon's Revenge for the Super Nintendo Entertainment System in North America in December 1993, followed by Europe in May 1994. The game was housed in a 16-megabit (2 MB) cartridge using the OBC-1, a sprite manipulation enhancement chip. Metal Combat was only released in Western regions, as the Super Scope proved to be less popular in Japan. The cover was illustrated by artist Stephen Peringer.

== Reception ==
Reception

Review scores
Publication	Score
Electronic Gaming Monthly	31/40 (Note: Electronic Gaming Monthly's review was by four critics with different ratings out of 10: 9, 7, 8, and 7.)
Game Players	92%
GamePro	16.5/20 (Note: GamePro provided scores of 4/5 for graphics, 3.5/5 for sound, and 4.5/5 twice for control and fun factor.)
HobbyConsolas	85/100
Nintendo Power	14.1/20 (Note: Nintendo Power provided scores of 3.4 for graphics and sound, 3.6 twice for play control and challenge, and 3.5 for theme and fun.)
Player One	75%
Nintendo Acción	80/100

Metal Combat: Falcon's Revenge received generally favorable reception from critics. Nintendo Power considered it to be a much improved follow-up to Battle Clash and highlighted its multiplayer mode; however, they found the single-player campaign weak, pointing out the difficulty of seeing incoming enemy fire. Electronic Gaming Monthly's reviewers celebrated the game for having colorful graphics and deeper gameplay than most Super Scope titles, and cited the two-player mode as the best feature, although they did not like its difficulty. Game Players's Chris Slate lauded each of the game's enemies for their different strategies, as well as the soundscapes, variety of modes, and replay value. GamePro's Captain Squideo described it as "much harder, faster, and ultimately better than any previous Super Scope game, including Battle Clash". Squideo praised the detailed graphics that allow the player to spot enemy weak points, but criticized the text between fights and low-quality voice samples.

Hobby Consolas' Antonio Caravaca praised the game's visual quality, sound effects, difficulty, and two-player mode, but criticized the occasional flickering that occurs during explosions. Nintendo Acción gave favorable remarks to the game's mech designs, audio, and various game modes, but criticized the story mode for its short duration. Player One's Jean-Pierre Abidal found the action in the game to be fun but repetitive. Hardcore Gaming 101's David DeRienzo lauded the game's improved audiovisual presentation, refined combat system, and modes of play, writing that "Metal Combat manages to surpass its predecessor in every imaginable way while still offering the same great core play experience". Destructoid's Zoey Handley regarded it as one of the best light gun games ever developed.
