= X-Zone =

1992 video game

- Box art
- Developer: Kemco
- Publisher: Kemco
- Composers: S. Yamaguchi; Hiroyuki Masuno
- Platform: Super Nintendo Entertainment System
- Release: US: 1992; EU/JP: 1993
- Genre: Rail shooter
- Mode: Single-player

X-Zone (エックス・ゾーン) is a rail shooting video game released in 1992 by Kemco for the Super NES. It is played with the Super Scope light gun.

== Gameplay ==
The players assume the role of a soldier in flying power-armor assigned to destroy an army of malfunctioning defense robots commanded by a sentient bio-computer in its sudden war against humanity.

== Development and release ==
X-Zone was released by Kemco.

== Reception ==
Reception

Review scores
Publication	Score
Electronic Gaming Monthly	7/10, 8/10, 8/10, 8/10
Famitsu	6/10, 7/10, 5/10, 4/10
GameFan	81%, 83%
GamesMaster	54%
Joypad	77%
Super Play	55%
Total!	70%
Dengeki Super Famicom	7/10, 5/10, 6/10, 8/10
Hippon Super!	6/10
Nintendomagasinet	6/10
The Super Famicom	58/100
Super Pro	79/100

X-Zone received average reviews from critics.

The four reviewers in Electronic Gaming Monthly complimented the game, with one reviewer describing the highlights being a varied assortment of enemies, and another calling it fun and challenging. Two reviewers said it was the first game to use a Super Scope well.
