= Satoshi Tajiri =

Japanese video game designer (born 1965)

- 田尻 智
- Born: August 28, 1965 (age 61); Setagaya, Tokyo, Japan
- Education: National Institute of Technology, Tokyo College
- Occupations: Game director, game producer, game design
- Employer: Game Freak (1989–present)
- Known for: Pokémon series
- Title: President & CEO

Satoshi Tajiri (Japanese: 田尻 智, Hepburn: Tajiri Satoshi; born August 28, 1965) is a Japanese video game designer and director who is the creator of the Pokémon franchise and the co-founder and president of video game developer Game Freak.

A fan of arcade games in his youth, Tajiri wrote for and edited his own video gaming fanzine Game Freak with Ken Sugimori, before evolving it into a development company of the same name. Tajiri claims that the joining of two Game Boys via a link cable inspired him to create a game which embodied the collection and companionship of his childhood hobby, insect collecting. The game, which became Pokémon Red and Pokémon Green, took six years to complete and went on to spark a multibillion-dollar franchise which reinvigorated Nintendo's handheld gaming scene. Tajiri continued to work as director for the Pokémon series until the development of Pokémon Ruby and Sapphire, when he changed his role to executive producer, which he holds to this day. Tajiri has also worked for other Game Freak projects.

== Early life ==
Satoshi Tajiri was born on August 28, 1965, in Setagaya, Tokyo. Tajiri grew up in Machida, Tokyo, which at the time still maintained a rural atmosphere and was rapidly growing. Tajiri enjoyed insect collecting as a child. He and his friends would exchange insects, which later became the inspiration for his video game development. Other children called him "Dr. Bug", and he wanted to become an entomologist. As urban areas of Japan spread and more land was paved over, habitats for hunting bugs were lost. Tajiri wanted his games to allow children to have the feeling of catching and collecting creatures as he had.

He became fascinated with arcade games as a teenager, though his parents thought he was a delinquent for this pastime. He particularly enjoyed playing Taito's Space Invaders (1978), which drew him into other video games. Space Invaders got him interested in video games; after playing Space Invaders and its video game clones, he wanted to make his own sequel to Space Invaders. He was also inspired by Namco games designed around a single specific action, notably Dig Dug (1982). His interest eventually evolved into attempting to plan his own games. He took his Famicom apart to see how it worked, and won a contest for a video game idea sponsored by Sega.

Because of his fascination with video games, Tajiri frequently cut classes. He took make-up classes and eventually earned his high school diploma. Tajiri did not attend university, but instead attended a two-year technical degree program at the National Institute of Technology, Tokyo College, where he majored in electronics and computer science.

== Career ==
Tajiri wrote and edited a fanzine called Game Freak from 1981 to 1986, focusing on the arcade game scene. It was handwritten and stapled together. Satoshi created the Game Freak fanzine to help gamers with winning strategies and lists of easter eggs. The highest selling issue, at more than 10,000 copies, details how to get a high score in Xevious. Ken Sugimori, who later illustrated the first 151 Pokémon, saw the magazine at a dōjinshi shop, and became its illustrator. As more contributors came to Game Freak, Tajiri began to realize that most games were lacking in quality, and he and Sugimori decided the solution was to make their own games. Tajiri studied the Family BASIC game programming package, to better grasp the concepts of Famicom game design. He then purchased the requisite hardware for game development. Tajiri and Sugimori evolved the magazine into the video game development company Game Freak in 1989. Soon after, the two pitched their first game, an arcade-style game called Quinty, to Namco, who published the game. Tajiri also wrote as a freelance writer for the magazine Famicom Hisshoubon, later called Hippon Super!, and reviewed arcade games for Family Computer Magazine and Famicom Tsūshin.

Tajiri first conceived the idea of Pokémon in 1990. The idea came together after he saw a Game Boy and the ability to communicate between Game Boys, and Tajiri decided Pokémon made the most sense on the handheld console. When he thought about the link cable being able to interact with two Game Boys, he envisioned bugs crawling back and forth, recalling his childhood love of bug collecting. Tajiri advanced the connectivity between handheld game consoles beyond Tetris style competition, by suggesting that Game Boys could use their link cables to trade collectibles.

When he first pitched the idea of Pokémon to Nintendo staff, they could not quite grasp the concept, but were impressed enough with Tajiri's game design reputation that they decided to explore it. Shigeru Miyamoto began to mentor Tajiri, guiding him during the creation process. Pokémon Red and Green took six years to produce, and nearly bankrupted Game Freak in the process; often, there was barely enough money to pay the employees. Five employees quit, and Tajiri did not take a salary, instead living off of his father's income. Investment from Creatures Inc. allowed Game Freak to complete the games, and in return, Creatures received one-third of the franchise rights.

Between the approval and completion stages of the project, Tajiri assisted in the design of two Mario spin-off games for Nintendo: Yoshi and the Japanese-only release Mario & Wario. He also worked on 1994's Pulseman for Sega.

Once the games were completed, very few media outlets gave it attention, believing the Game Boy was a dead console; a general lack of interest of merchandising convinced Tajiri that Nintendo would reject the games. The Pokémon games were not expected to do well, but sales steadily increased until the series found itself among Nintendo's top franchises. Rumors of a hidden Pokémon creature named Mew, which could only be obtained by exploiting programming errors, increased interest in the game. Tajiri had included Mew in the game in order to promote trading and interaction between players, but Nintendo was not aware of the creature upon release. The franchise helped Nintendo's waning sales. Tajiri deliberately toned down violence in his games. In this vein, he designed Pokémon creatures to faint rather than die upon their defeat, as he believed it was unhealthy for children to equate the concept of death with losing a game. After the completion and release of Red and Green in Japan, Tajiri later worked on 1997's Bushi Seiryūden: Futari no Yūsha. Tajiri continues to be involved in the more modern Pokémon games as well. For Pokémon FireRed and LeafGreen, he supervised the process from start to finish and approved all the text. While developing games, Tajiri works irregular hours, often laboring 24 hours at a time and resting 12 hours.

=== Inspirations ===
Tajiri cites Shigeru Miyamoto as a major influence, thinking of him as a sort of mentor. For this reason, his developmental style closely matches that of Miyamoto. In the Japanese version of the Pokémon anime, the main character is named Satoshi (Ash Ketchum in the English version), and his rival is Shigeru (Gary Oak in the English version).

Tajiri drew much of his inspiration from old Japanese TV shows and movies, including Godzilla and Ultraman. He has stated that if he did not design video games, he would most likely be in the anime field.

=== Awards and recognition ===
IGN named Tajiri one of the top 100 game creators of all time, mainly for his ability to have built Pokémon into a "worldwide phenomenon". Electronic Gaming Monthly credited Tajiri as one of the 10 most influential people who made the modern video game market. Video game magazine Edge placed Tajiri on their list of the "Hot 100 Game Developers of 2008". Tajiri, alongside Tsunekazu Ishihara, received the Special Award from the Computer Entertainment Developers Conference in 2011. The Economist has described Pokémon as "Japan's most successful export."

== Works ==
=== Games ===
Year	Game title	Role
1989	Mendel Palace	Director, producer, game designer
1991	Smart Ball	Director, game designer, scenario
1991	Yoshi	Director, game designer
1992	Magical★Taruruto-kun	Producer
1993	Mario & Wario	Director, game designer, map design
1994	Nontan to Issho: KuruKuru Puzzle	Planner
1994	Pulseman	Director, game designer
1995	Jerry Boy 2 (unreleased)	Supervisor
1996	Pokémon Red, Green and Blue	Director, game designer, map design, scenario
1996	Bazaar de Gosāru no Game de Gosāru	Advisor
1997	Bushi Seiryūden: Futari no Yūsha	Concept, game designer
1998	Pokémon Yellow	Director, game designer, map design, scenario
1999	Click Medic	Concept
1999	Pokémon Gold and Silver	Director, game designer
2000	Pokémon Crystal	Director, executive director
2002	Pokémon Ruby and Sapphire	Executive director
2003	Pokémon Box: Ruby and Sapphire	Executive director
2004	Pokémon FireRed and LeafGreen	Scenario, executive director
2004	Pokémon Emerald	Executive director
2005	Drill Dozer	Executive producer
2006	Pokémon Diamond and Pearl	Executive producer
2008	Super Smash Bros. Brawl	Senior supervisor
2008	Pokémon Platinum	Executive producer
2009	Pokémon HeartGold and SoulSilver	Executive producer
2010	Pokémon Black and White	Executive producer
2012	Pokémon Black 2 and White 2	Executive producer
2012	HarmoKnight	Executive producer
2013	Pocket Card Jockey	Executive producer
2013	Pokémon X and Y	Executive producer
2014	Super Smash Bros. for Nintendo 3DS and Wii U	Senior supervisor
2014	Pokémon Omega Ruby and Alpha Sapphire	Executive producer
2015	Tembo the Badass Elephant	Executive producer
2016	Pokémon Sun and Moon	Executive producer
2017	Giga Wrecker	Executive producer
2017	Pokémon Ultra Sun and Ultra Moon	Executive producer
2018	Pokémon Quest	Executive producer
2018	Pokémon: Let's Go, Pikachu! and Let's Go, Eevee!	Executive producer
2019	Little Town Hero	Executive producer
2019	Pokémon Sword and Shield	Executive producer
2021	Pokémon Brilliant Diamond and Shining Pearl	Executive producer
2022	Pokémon Legends: Arceus	Executive producer
2022	Pokémon Scarlet and Violet	Executive producer
2025	Pokémon Legends: Z-A	Executive producer
2026	Pokémon Pokopia	Executive producer
2026	Beast of Reincarnation	Executive producer

=== Bibliography ===
- Tajiri, Satoshi (2002). パックランドでつかまえて [A Catcher in Pac-Land: Video Game Youth Story] (in Japanese). Enterbrain. ISBN 4-7577-1004-6.
- Tajiri, Satoshi (1996). 新ゲームデザイン [New Game Design] (in Japanese). Enix. ISBN 4-87025-858-7.
- Miya, Shotaro (2004). 田尻智ポケモンを創った男 [Satoshi Tajiri: The Man Who Created Pokémon] (in Japanese). Ohta Publishing. ISBN 4-87233-833-2.

== See also ==
- Pokémon
- Game Freak
- Ash Ketchum
