= Super Scope 6 =

1992 video game

- North American box art
- Developers: Nintendo R&D1; Intelligent Systems
- Publisher: Nintendo
- Director: Yoshio Sakamoto
- Producer: Makoto Kano
- Composers: Kenji Yamamoto; Hajime Hirasawa
- Platform: Super Nintendo Entertainment System
- Release: NA: February 1992; JP: June 21, 1993; EU: August 27, 1993
- Genre: Shooter
- Mode: Single-player

Super Scope 6, (Note: Japanese: スーパースコープ6, Hepburn: Sūpā Sukōpu6) known as Nintendo Scope 6 in Europe and Australia, is a shooter video game developed by Nintendo and Intelligent Systems and published by Nintendo for the Super Nintendo Entertainment System. The game was bundled with the Super Scope for the Super NES. As the name suggests, the cartridge contains six games that require the Super Scope to play.

== Gameplay ==
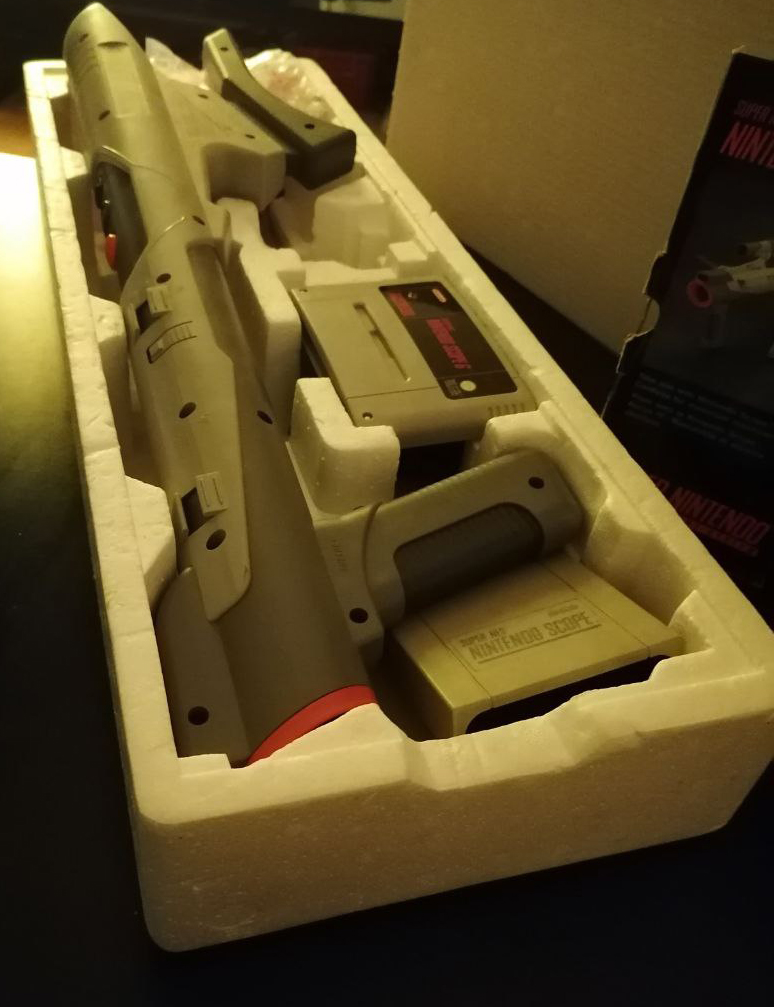
Game set (European release)

When the player turns on the SNES with the Super Scope 6 cartridge inserted, they will be presented with a title screen that reads Super NES Super Scope 6 in red italicized letters across the top of the screen. The bottom is filled with a diagram of the Super Scope and the names of its buttons. The player must shoot the screen to begin the game.

The next screen is the calibration routine required by all Super Scope titles. The screen displays a white target with a blue background. The player is instructed to shoot the "bull's-eye" of the target. Doing so tells the SNES where the center of the screen is relative to the Super Scope and its interface box. After calibration, the player is asked to test the aim to verify its accuracy. It is not required to shoot the bullseye this time, but it's important that the shot mark lines up with where the player aimed and fired though. If the player misses the bullseye during calibration, or if they move the Super Scope or its interface box afterwards, the shots fired in game will not be accurate.

After the calibration routine the player is presented with two options, each of which leads to three of the six games. The option on top is titled Blastris, the bottom option is LazerBlazer.

=== Blastris ===
If the player fires at the Blastris option, they will be asked to choose among three games: Blastris A, Blastris B, and Mole Patrol. The player selects the desired game by aiming at its box and pressing fire. After selecting the game the bottom half of the screen fills with three option boxes which differ depending on the game selected. There are three difficulty settings for each game ("Low", "Medium", and "High"), which simply determine the stage that the player starts on.

Blastris A is loosely based on Tetris. It can be played by either one or two players. The playing field is a box seven rows high and ten columns across. Above the playing field on the right is a box with five darkened lights. Below the playing field is the status bar. The status bar displays the current score, level, and number of shots available. Various configurations of blocks scroll from left to right and stop upon hitting the wall or another block. Blocks can be destroyed by being shot. The player gets two shots per block that appears; one can choose whether to use them in that block or save them for later. Upon filling a vertical line with blocks, the line disappears and the remaining blocks to the left shift one position to the right. The player must clear five lines in order to progress to the next level. The game ends when any row is filled with ten blocks and reaches the far left side of the screen.

Blastris B plays more like Sega's Columns. Single multi-colored blocks are dropped in random locations, and the player must arrange blocks in rows, columns, or diagonal lines of the same color. Shooting the falling blocks makes them change color. Some blocks' colors are unchangeable, indicated by their metallic borders and the noise that results from shooting them (a metallic clang). The player can choose between a stage-based game mode (which involves a set number of blocks on the bottom level that the player must eliminate), or a single nonstop game mode.

Mole Patrol involves protecting a garden from evil blue moles by shooting them. More points are given based on the player's reaction time and accuracy, much like a Whac-A-Mole game. Mole Patrol involves two modes: Stage Game and Score Game. Stage Game divides the game into levels. In each, the player must shoot all of the moles before the time runs out, otherwise the game is over. There are also red moles that, once shot, speed up the clock in the upper-right corner, increasing the speed of the moles, thereby making the task harder (the red moles don't count towards the total number of moles per stage). From time to time throughout the game, a mole will appear in the sky, flying on a rocket, presumably from LazerBlazer's Intercept mode. Shooting it results in bonus points. This mode ends when time runs out. Score mode is a single level mode in which the player must shoot the moles in order to gain a higher score at the end of the level. If the player shoots out the moles quickly and without missing any single shot, the score will be higher.

=== LazerBlazer ===
Selecting the LazerBlazer option allows the player to choose among three separate types: Type A (Intercept), Type B (Engage), and Type C (Confront). The games are presented in three boxes, in a similar fashion to Blastris. A communication screen on the right displays a lady who gives the player instructions. Each game in LazerBlazer consists of 30 levels, and finishing those levels will end the game. Intercept is the only game in LazerBlazer to allow two players to play three levels in alternating turns; the rest are one player only.

In Intercept, the player must shoot down incoming missiles before they reach the opposite side of the screen. The missiles' distance from the screen sight varies, and the player has to judge the distance, or their shot will pass too late or too early. If the player misses five missiles, the game ends. The player can only shoot three bullets at a time, and it takes some time to refill them. Mario appears piloting a plane, chased by Lemmy Koopa riding on a rocket, in some one-player game levels or in Level 2 of the two-player game. Hitting Lemmy will either recover a miss or award the player bonus points in the one-player or two-player games, respectively. If the player hits Mario instead, it will count as a miss or those points are void (again, depending on which mode the player is in).

In Engage, the player shoots down enemy fighters and incoming missiles before the player ship's fuel runs out. As in Intercept, the player has to judge the enemies' speed and distance in order to hit them. If the player gets hit five times or the ship's fuel runs out, the game is over. The player can only shoot four bullets at a time, and it takes some time to refill them. When a level finishes, a green ship refills the player's ship's fuel. Occasionally, a red ship appears. It not only refills fuel, but it can recover one hit point.

In Confront, the player fights off an incoming invasion of enemy ships. Unlike Intercept or Engage, the player can shoot an infinite number of bullets at any time. When an enemy has not been destroyed for a while, it will attack. When the player has been hit five times, the game is over. During some moments, flashing enemies will appear. Shooting them will recover a hit point.

== Reception ==
Reception

Review scores
Publication	Score
Electronic Gaming Monthly	5/10, 3/10, 5/10, 6/10
Famitsu	7/10, 5/10, 7/10, 5/10
Mega Fun	55/100
Player One	77%
Total!	43%
Mean Machines	46%
Play Time	54%

In Japan, the game topped the Famitsu sales chart in June 1993. Super Scope 6 received mixed reviews from critics.
