= Quik the Thunder Rabbit =

1994 video game

- Cover artwork for the Amiga release.
- Developer: Stywox
- Publisher: Titus France
- Programmer: Vincent Penne
- Artists: Bruno Gore, Frederic Paris, and Guillaume Geoffroy
- Composer: Philippe Verriere
- Platforms: Amiga; Amiga CD32
- Release: 1994
- Genre: Platform

Quik the Thunder Rabbit is a side-scrolling platform video game, which Stywox developed for Titus France to publish on the Amiga and Amiga CD32 in 1994. A port for the Super NES was planned but cancelled.
