= Tarzan: Lord of the Jungle =

1994 video game

- Game Boy cover art
- Developer: Eurocom
- Publisher: GameTek
- Producer: Travis Williams
- Designer: Mat Sneap
- Programmer: David J. Looker
- Artist: Steve Bedser
- Composer: Martin Walker
- Series: Tarzan
- Platforms: Game Boy, Game Gear
- Release: Game Boy: EU: 1994; NA: October 1994; Game Gear: EU: November 10, 1994; NA: Cancelled
- Genre: Platform
- Mode: Single-player

Tarzan: Lord of the Jungle is a 1994 video game for the Game Boy and Game Gear video game systems.

== Gameplay ==
The player controls Tarzan (based on the famous character created by Edgar Rice Burroughs for his novel Tarzan of the Apes) in six different missions set in Africa. These include curing the Great Ape's disease and saving his friends from the evil poachers. These poachers want to capture the wildlife and place them in their zoos. Weapons that can be utilized include: spears, knives, and arrows. Pitfalls and obstacles are to be avoided in order to collect the mandatory quest item. Under a strict time limit, players can swing on vines and swim vast bodies of water to cross various parts of stages.

== Development ==
The game was announced for the Super NES console, as well as the Game Boy and Game Gear handhelds. The Super NES version was being developed by Manley & Associates, however it was cancelled before release; a prototype ROM was found in October 2019.

== Reception ==
Reviewing the Game Boy version, GamePro commented that Tarzan: Lord of the Jungle "demands way too much patient replaying for the average fun it offers." They elaborated that inaccurate controls often fail the player when jumping through trees, forcing frequent backtracking, and that the lack of passwords means the player must navigate through the same mazes multiple times. Electronic Gaming Monthly gave it a 5.4 out of 10, commenting that "The many icons and challenging bosses make the trip worthwhile, but this is pretty much standard stuff with elements every action fan will recognize."
