= Fire Emblem Gaiden =

1992 video game

- Box art featuring Alm (center), Celica (left), Valbar (right), and Duma (top)
- Developer: Intelligent Systems
- Publisher: Nintendo
- Director: Shouzou Kaga
- Producer: Gunpei Yokoi
- Designer: Shouzou Kaga
- Programmer: Toru Narihiro
- Artists: Naotaka Ohnishi; Satoshi Machida; Toshitaka Muramatsu
- Writer: Shouzou Kaga
- Composer: Yuka Tsujiyoko
- Series: Fire Emblem
- Platform: Family Computer
- Release: JP: March 14, 1992
- Genre: Tactical role-playing
- Mode: Single-player

Fire Emblem Gaiden (Note: Japanese: ファイアーエムブレム外伝, Hepburn: Faiā Emuburemu Gaiden; lit. Fire Emblem Side Story) is a 1992 tactical role-playing game developed by Intelligent Systems and published by Nintendo for the Family Computer. It is the second installment in the Fire Emblem series and the last to be developed for the Famicom. It builds upon the basic turn-based strategy gameplay of the previous title, while including new elements such as a navigable overworld. Set in the same world as its predecessor, Fire Emblem: Shadow Dragon and the Blade of Light, Gaiden follows the battles of two opposing armies on the continent of Valentia, which is torn apart by political strife involving the princess Celica and her childhood friend Alm.

The development began after the commercial success of Shadow Dragon and the Blade of Light. Original designer and writer Shouzou Kaga returned and assumed the role of director, while Yuka Tsujiyoko and Gunpei Yokoi returned respectively as composer and producer. Kaga's main concern was addressing pacing issues from the first game, and allowing for a greater connection between players and the characters. The game was a commercial success, selling over 324,000 units as of 2002. It received mixed reviews from critics, and was later compared to Super Mario Bros. 2 and Zelda II: The Adventure of Link as the "black sheep" of the series. Some elements would be used in later Fire Emblem titles. A full remake, titled Fire Emblem Echoes: Shadows of Valentia, was released worldwide on the Nintendo 3DS in 2017.

== Gameplay ==
A battle in Gaiden featuring the player party fighting enemy soldiers

Fire Emblem Gaiden is a tactical role-playing game set on the continent of Valentia. Players assume control of two armies, led by Alm and Celica, who navigate an overworld and can visit towns, where they may recruit new allies or talk to traders to transfer items between the groups. The overworld is freely navigable, with additional areas opening up as the story progresses. The game features two difficulty levels: "Normal" and "Easy". On easy mode, experience points earned through actions in combat are doubled and items can be exchanged between units beyond vendor stalls.

Battles use a turn-based battle system, with the player, enemies, and sometimes non-playable characters each taking turns and moving across a grid-based battlefield; battles are won by the player defeating all enemies in a map or killing a boss character. Enemies include human troops and monsters. The players are given a limited number of units, which are each assigned unique character classes that have various functions in battle, such as being mounted or having access to magic. A unit's class also affects their range of movement on the battlefield. In contrast to the previous game, character classes are not set but can switch once a character reaches a certain level. A special example of class promotion is the two main characters: Alm can promote from a fighter to a hero, while Celica promotes from a priestess to a princess. Each time a unit raises its experience level, its various stats increase based on a percent chance unique for each character. Spells for magical classes are learned through leveling up rather than being part of a separate system, and each spell consumes part of the caster's health when used.

== Synopsis ==
The continent of Valentia was once divided between the Earth Mother Mila and the War Father Duma, sibling gods who split up and formed rival nations devoted to worshiping them: Mila's Kingdom of Zofia, and Duma's Empire of Rigel. The two deities, who each held extreme viewpoints on the world, ended up corrupting their subjects, and Zofia was eventually swallowed in a war triggered by its military leader, Chancellor Desaix, who attempted a coup d'état. Rigel's ruler Emperor Rudolf used this opportunity to lead Rigel's armies across Valentia in an attempt to conquer both countries. A village boy named Alm sets out on a quest to overthrow Desaix and drive Rudolf out of Zofia. Meanwhile, his childhood friend Celica, the exiled Princess Antheise of Zofia, embarks on a pilgrimage to discover Mila's whereabouts after she vanishes, causing a drought in Zofia. The two meet at Zofia Castle, but part ways when Alm is unwilling to attempt to find a peaceful resolution with Rudolf. Alm invades Rigel and defeats Rudolf, who reveals with his dying breath that Alm is actually his son Albein Alm Rudolf. It is then explained that Rudolf's invasion was intended to strengthen the continent's military forces and create a champion capable of defeating Duma and Mila, who have both fallen into insanity due to their extreme power. Alm infiltrates the Duma Temple and slays Duma with Celica's aid. With Duma's defeat, both deities disappear from the world. Alm and Celica marry and unite Valentia under their rule.

== Development and release ==
The development began following the commercial success of Fire Emblem: Shadow Dragon and the Blade of Light in 1990. The original game's designer and writer Shouzou Kaga returned to those roles and also became director. In addition to Kaga, Gunpei Yokoi returned from Shadow Dragon and the Blade of Light as the game's producer, while the visuals were created by Naotaka Ohnishi, Satoshi Machida and Toshitaka Muramatsu. The music and sound design was handled by Yuka Tsujiyoko, who had worked on the first Fire Emblem. The game's subtitle, "Gaiden", is a Japanese term for a side story related to a larger work, denoting the game's status as a secondary adventure set in the same timeline as the first game.

Kaga designed Gaiden to address issues raised with the first game, such as tedious elements of map navigation. The system of Shadow Dragon and the Blade of Light was used as the base for various improvements to aspects such as enemy AI, although the gameplay adjustments ended up removing some of the strategic elements. These elements included a navigable overworld and more overt role-playing elements, along with the introduction of the class evolution system. Balancing these elements proved challenging for the team. The game made use of the new MMC4 memory chip, developed partially in response to the memory capacity problems faced during the development of the first game. For the story, Kaga wanted to deepen the relationship between the player and their units, represented through the growth of the characters through their battles. To create a stronger and broader central narrative, Kaga created the game's dual protagonists Alm and Celica. One overt reference to Shadow Dragon and the Blade of Light was made in the form of a trio of female Pegasus Knights, who were the same trio from the first game.

Gaiden was released on the Famicom on March 14, 1992. It released on a 2Mbit cartridge. It was the second and last game in the series to be developed for the system, and has never received an official release outside Japan. It would later receive multiple releases on Nintendo's digital Virtual Console platform: the version for the Wii released on November 4, 2009, the version for the Nintendo 3DS on April 3, 2013, and the version for the Wii U on August 20, 2014.

== Reception and legacy ==
Reception

Review scores
Publication	Score
Famitsu	7/10, 7/10, 7/10, 7/10
RPGFan	70/100

In Japan, it topped the Famitsu sales chart in March 1992. As of 2002, Gaiden had sold 324,699 units. This made Gaiden the fourth best-selling title in the Fire Emblem series to that date.

Four critics reviewed Fire Emblem Gaiden in video game magazine Famicom Tsūshin. In their review, critics noted that its gameplay changes meant that it could not be compared to its predecessor, with one critic enjoying its gameplay and calling it better than the first game. Another critic noted that it was fairly easy during the first half, then became rapidly more difficult during the later stages. Another reviewer noted that, while the number of maps had increased, the strategic elements had become noticeably weaker. Public reception was positive: in a poll taken by Family Computer Magazine, it received a score of 24.3 out of 30, indicating a large popular following. In a later retrospective article on the Fire Emblem series, Pocket Gamer's Mark Brown compared Gaiden's radical and short-lived shift in gameplay to that of Zelda II: The Adventure of Link. Nadia Oxford of USGamer also compared Gaiden to Zelda II due to its short-lived gameplay changes, in addition to the similar case of Castlevania II: Simon's Quest.

While the majority of Gaiden's new gameplay elements would be discarded in later entries, the concept of class evolution was retained throughout following entries. The concept of a navigable overworld map and towns the player could visit was later explored in the Game Boy Advance entry Fire Emblem: The Sacred Stones in 2005. The story concept of the returning Pegasus Knights from Shadow Dragon and the Blade of Light was also revisited in the Nintendo 3DS title Fire Emblem Fates in 2015, with the inclusion of characters from its 2012 predecessor Fire Emblem Awakening.

== Remake ==
A full remake of the game, titled Fire Emblem Echoes: Shadows of Valentia, was released worldwide for the Nintendo 3DS in 2017. As Gaiden was released in Japan only, it marked the first time a form of the game was released overseas.
