= Spellcraft: Aspects of Valor =

1992 video game

- Developer(s): Asciiware
- Publisher(s): Broderbund
- Designer(s): Joseph Ybarra
- Platform(s): MS-DOS
- Release: 1992
- Genre(s): Role-playing, Strategy
- Mode(s): Single-player

Spellcraft: Aspects of Valor is a strategy game released for MS-DOS in 1992 by Asciiware. A Super Nintendo Entertainment System version was cancelled.

== Overview ==
This is a game about Robert, a simple man with a destiny. It begins with him receiving a letter from a relative in England, in which he is invited to meet at Stonehenge. When he arrives he is whisked away to Valoria. Valoria is a magical place with Orcs, Dragons, and Wizards. There he learns of his destiny.

Spellcraft consists of fighting in one of seven realms: Earth, Fire, Air, Water, Mind, Ether, and Death. Each realm can be morphed, damaged, and manipulated by magical spells that are cast by either the player or an enemy wizard. The player's character can attack with his sword and cast spells when in a realm. Spells consist of the following types: Attack, Defense, Terrain Modifier, Personal Modifier, Transformations, and Creature Summoning.

Magical spells are created through the use of spell components. Start with one Aspect. Mix in a specific ratio of Powders, Jewels, Stones, and Candles. Then say the magic word. This creates a base of a magic spell that can be duplicated and used in battle. If the wrong formula is used, the player will die in one of many horrific deaths. The key is to solve the formulas by information both gathered in game and in the game's manual. The manual contains a mostly empty table where players can write-in all the spells they make in the game. Later, the player can modify his spells to customize them by slightly altering their formula to enhance one or many attributes.

Also the player can speak and trade with a variety of NPCs located across Earth. They provide hints to formulas and provide tidbits of story.

== Reception ==
The game was reviewed in 1993 in Dragon #190 by Hartley, Patricia, and Kirk Lesser in "The Role of Computers" column. The reviewers gave the game 4 out of 5 stars. Electronic Gaming Monthly gave the SNES version a 6 out of 10, praising the use of real time combat and concluding that "RPG fans will definitely want to check this one out."
