= Smart Ball =

1991 video game

Smart Ball (Jerry Boy)
- North American cover art
- Developers: Game Freak; System Sacom
- Publishers: JP: Epic/Sony Records; NA: Sony Imagesoft
- Director: Satoshi Tajiri
- Designers: Satoshi Tajiri; Ken Sugimori; Akihito Tomisawa
- Programmer: Mark Flint
- Artists: Ken Sugimori; Mucho Tanaka
- Writers: Satoshi Tajiri; Ken Sugimori
- Composers: Yasuhiko Fukuda; Akira Yamaoka; Manabu Saito
- Platform: Super NES
- Release: JP: September 13, 1991; NA: March 1992
- Genre: Action-adventure
- Mode: Single-player

Smart Ball (Note: Known in Japan as Jerry Boy (Japanese: ジェリーボーイ)) is a platform game developed by Game Freak and System Sacom. It was published by Epic/Sony Records and Sony Imagesoft for the Super Nintendo Entertainment System in 1991. A sequel titled Jerry Boy 2 (Note: Japanese: ジェリーボーイ2) was in production, but was not released.

== Gameplay ==
Gameplay screenshot.

In that incarnation, the player plays as a little jelly bean with eyes, named Jerry, traveling across a grassy landscape. The game has graphics and terrain that are characterized as cartoony and cute, which attracts younger players.

The player is able to defend Jerry or attack enemies by controlling certain physical characteristics of Jerry, such as flattening or stretching his body in order to hit enemies, or by finding objects, such as balls, to throw at enemies. The player can also run by pressing the Y button on the controller. Jerry has the ability to stick to walls and ceilings which is activated by holding down the Y button as he jumps towards them, adding an advantage over Jerry's enemies. The player advances through each level along a filmstrip map, and can revisit previously completed levels by "rewinding" the filmstrip. Each level is a romp up and down hills, jumping between platforms, and squeezing through pipes. Scattered around each level are a number of plants that open up to reveal balls, power-ups, 1-ups, seeds and jumping enhancers. Similar to Donkey Kong Country, the player must collect letters that spell "JERRY" in each level. Collecting them all will give the player two extra lives.

== Plot ==
A young boy named Jerry was a prince and ruler of a kingdom but has been transformed into a blob by a mysterious witch at the behest of his jealous brother, Tom, who has a crush on the young princess Emi.

== Development and release ==
Smart Ball was co-developed by Game Freak and System Sacom.

The entire storyline from the game, as well as all the towns in levels, were removed in the North American version. However, there is an English fan-made translation patch that can be applied on a Japanese ROM and played on an emulator.

== Reception ==
Reception

Review scores
Publication	Score
ACE	890/1000
AllGame	3/5
Computer and Video Games	85/100
Famitsu	6/10, 7/10, 7/10, 5/10
Games-X	4.5/5
Super Play	6/10
Control	64%
Game Boy	3/5, 2/5, 2/5, 3/5
Hippon Super!	7/10
N-Force	91%
SNES Force	(JP) 86%, (NA) 87%
Super Action	89%
Super Gamer	43%
The Super Famicom	B−
Super Pro	43%

According to Famitsu, Smart Ball sold 3,345 copies in its first week on the market and 33,283 copies during its lifetime in Japan. The game received a 21.33/30 score in a 1993 readers' poll conducted by Super Famicom Magazine, ranking among Super Famicom titles at the number 112 spot. It also received generally favorable reception from critics. Super Play stated that the game is a "run-of-the-mill platform game with only its blob-shaped hero to distinguish it from the crowd. We reckon it seems pretty average". The game won the Digital Content Association's AVA Multimedia Grand Prix Award for character design.

== Legacy ==
=== Adaptation ===
Smart Ball is one of the video games featured in the manga titled Rock'n Game Boy, by Shigeto Ikehara and published by Comic BomBom from October 1989 to December 1991.

=== Canceled sequel ===
Sony Music Entertainment Japan planned to release the sequel in 1994, however it was canceled. The developer was Game Freak: Satoshi Tajiri was the supervisor, Ken Sugimori the character designer, and Yoshinori Sunahara the music composer.

The game was to be released about three years later and was slated for a Japan-only release, but it was cancelled at the last minute. Sony may have been responsible for the cancelation. The company were to help publish the game as well as having helped publish the original, but due to a strain between Nintendo and Sony around the time of the game's release and Sony moving on to their own system at the time, the PlayStation, the game was cancelled as a result.

In the proposed sequel, the player would take control of one of six different playable characters, each with a unique special ability. The game would have also featured an updated engine allowing for larger gameplay and enemy variety. Despite the cancellation, Smart Ball was not the last Game Freak game to be published by Sony. The last Game Freak game published by Sony was Click Medic for PlayStation, which was published in 1999.
