= Mendel Palace =

1989 video game

- North American cover art
- Developer: Game Freak
- Publishers: JP: Namco; NA: Hudson Soft
- Director: Satoshi Tajiri
- Producer: Satoshi Tajiri
- Designer: Satoshi Tajiri
- Programmer: Yuji Shinkai
- Artist: Ken Sugimori
- Composer: Junichi Masuda
- Platform: Nintendo Entertainment System
- Release: JP: June 27, 1989; NA: October 1990
- Genres: Action, puzzle
- Modes: Single-player, multiplayer

Mendel Palace (Note: Known in Japan as Quinty (クインティ, Kuinti)) is a 1989 puzzle video game developed by Game Freak for the Nintendo Entertainment System. It was published in Japan by Namco and in North America by Hudson Soft. Mendel Palace is the debut game of Satoshi Tajiri and his company Game Freak. This success inspired him to create the Pokémon series. It was released for the Nintendo Switch as a part of the Nintendo Classics service.

== Plot ==
The player's character must save his girlfriend, who was kidnapped by a young girl. The backstory differs slightly between the Japanese and American versions, although the in-game presentation is the same regardless. In the American version, the player's character is named Bon-Bon and the girl he must rescue is named Candy, who is trapped in her own dream. In the Japanese version, the main character is named Carton, and his girlfriend Jenny has been kidnapped by Carton's younger sister Quinty (the titular character in the Japanese version), who is jealous of the attention that Jenny gets.

== Gameplay ==
The game can be played by a single player, or by two players cooperatively. The players' characters are a blue- and a green-colored boy in a vest and cap. Each level consists of a single room composed of a 5 by 7 grid of floor tiles surrounded by a boundary wall. At the beginning of each level a number of enemy dolls appear and start to wander around, attempting to collide with the player. The characters have the ability to "flip" the floor tile they are standing on or adjacent to in order to propel enemy dolls away, as well as revealing new floor tiles underneath. Enemies can be destroyed by flipping them into a wall or impassable block. The player(s) must destroy every doll to complete the level and move to the next one. It is also possible to win certain levels by making a "stalemate" in which all the tiles are unflippable like the bolted metal tiles or the graffiti tiles from the Artist dolls.

Each doll does a simple action that varies from each world. They vary from the basic walking motion to swimming and even aggressive tile flippers who have the same abilities to flip random tiles as the player. The level select screen shows each palace along with the enemy dolls that occupy it. Enemy dolls can be destroyed by flipping them into a wall or block, or by slamming into them from a Spinner tile. Touching an enemy causes the player to instantly lose a life. Each world has ten levels which is accompanied by a boss and a scene showing the player's girlfriend being whisked off to another part of the realm.

Stars and lives for each player are tracked separately on the screen. Some rooms are in darkness where players must anticipate useful tiles and enemies well in advance. If one player loses all of his lives, then the other player must continue to play until he also loses all of his lives.

There are a variety of patterns on the floor tiles that can be collected or affect gameplay. Each particular tile can hide many patterns underneath that can be revealed after multiple flippings.

== Development ==
Satoshi Tajiri had initially used Nintendo's Family BASIC (1984) as a gateway to build his understanding of the internal operation of the Famicom. This inspired him to create his own handmade Famicom game development hardware from spare electronics parts, spend two years learning programming, and spend one year making Game Freak's debut game Quinty. Tajiri had already written entire issues of his magazine called Game Freak solely about his favorite arcade game, Xevious (1983), so he wanted Quinty to be published in Japan by Namco, which had made Xevious and several other cute, colorful arcade games.

Tajiri marketed Quinty to American NES licensees by driving a rental car "all over the West Coast". It was rejected by most as "too cute" until Hudson Soft accepted while altering the title and the package art to reduce cuteness.

== Reception ==
Reception

Review score
Publication	Score
GamePro	18/25

The game sold 67,938 units in Japan and about 60,000 copies in the United States, adding up to about 127,938 units sold worldwide.

Chris Kohler called Quinty "a fond look back at the classic arcade game style that Tajiri and [Game Freak magazine co-author Ken Sugimori] loved, with simple, easy-to-learn game play and beautifully animated graphics". In 2003, the Tokyo Metropolitan Museum of Photography made an exhibit for the Famicom game library, spotlighting Quinty with the label of "The End Result of the Otaku Culture of the '80s" and calling its simple controls upon a single screen "decidedly old school".

== Legacy ==
The publishing process and commercial success of Quinty and Mendel Palace honed Tajiri's inspiration and skills to create the Pokémon video game series on Game Boy, which grew to become the highest-grossing media franchise of all time. A remake was planned for the Super Famicom, to be distributed via the Nintendo Power service and later Virtual Console for Wii, but was never released. Bandai Namco Entertainment and B.B. Studio included the game as part of Namcot Collection under license from Game Freak. The game was added to the Nintendo Classics library on April 9, 2026.
