= Super Scope =

SNES light gun peripheral

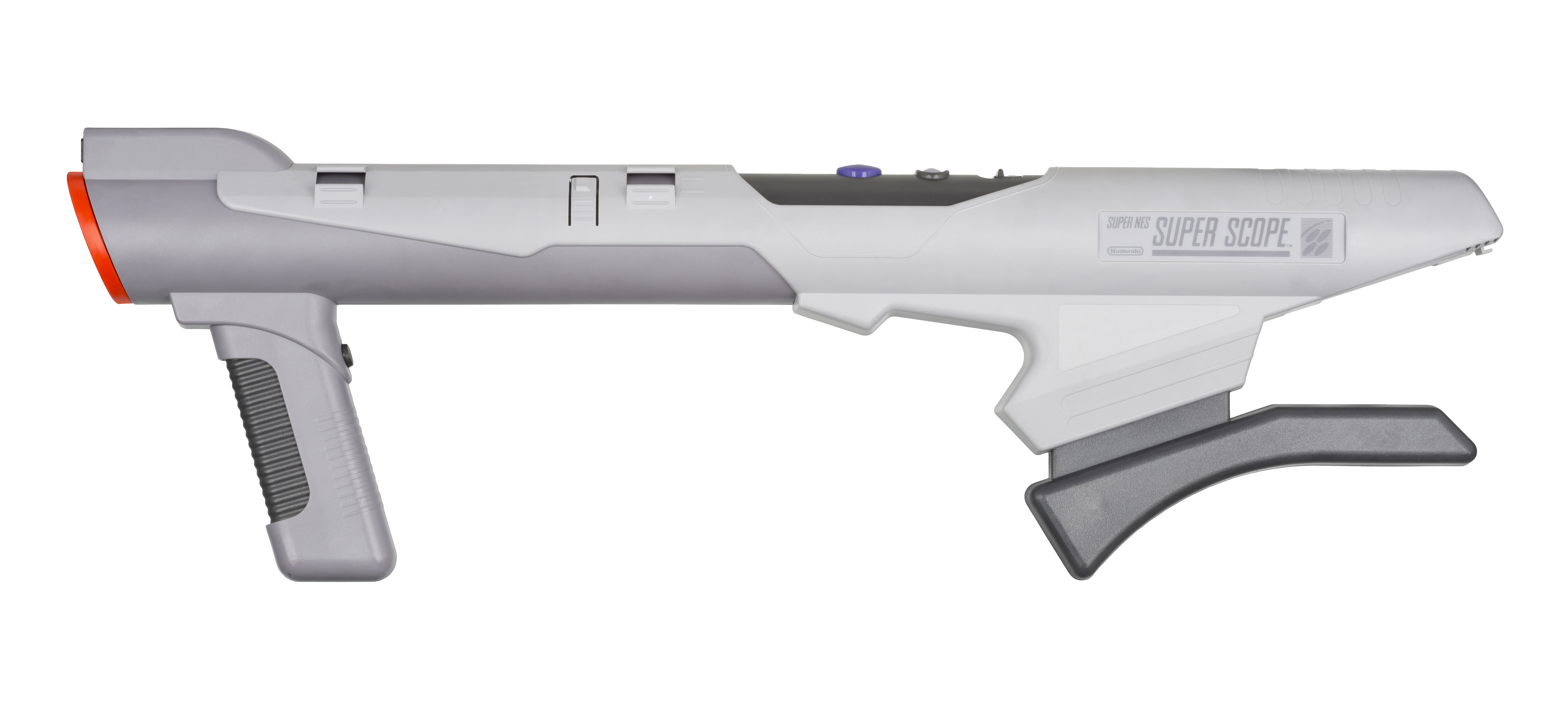
- The Nintendo Super Scope (without its sight)
- Also known as: Nintendo Scope
- Developer: Nintendo
- Manufacturer: Nintendo
- Type: Video game console peripheral
- Generation: Fourth generation
- Released: NA: February 1992; JP: June 21, 1993; EU: August 27, 1993
- Discontinued: 1997
- Media: Input device

The Super Scope, (Note: Japanese: スーパースコープ, Hepburn: Sūpā Sukōpu) known as the Nintendo Scope in Europe and Australia, is a light gun peripheral created by Nintendo for the Super Nintendo Entertainment System. It is able to aim and fire at targets on a screen by connecting to a small infrared receiver module placed on top of the television. The peripheral was first released in 1992 and packaged with the video game Super Scope 6. Only twelve total games were compatible with the device, all released between 1992 and 1994.

== Overview ==
=== Design ===
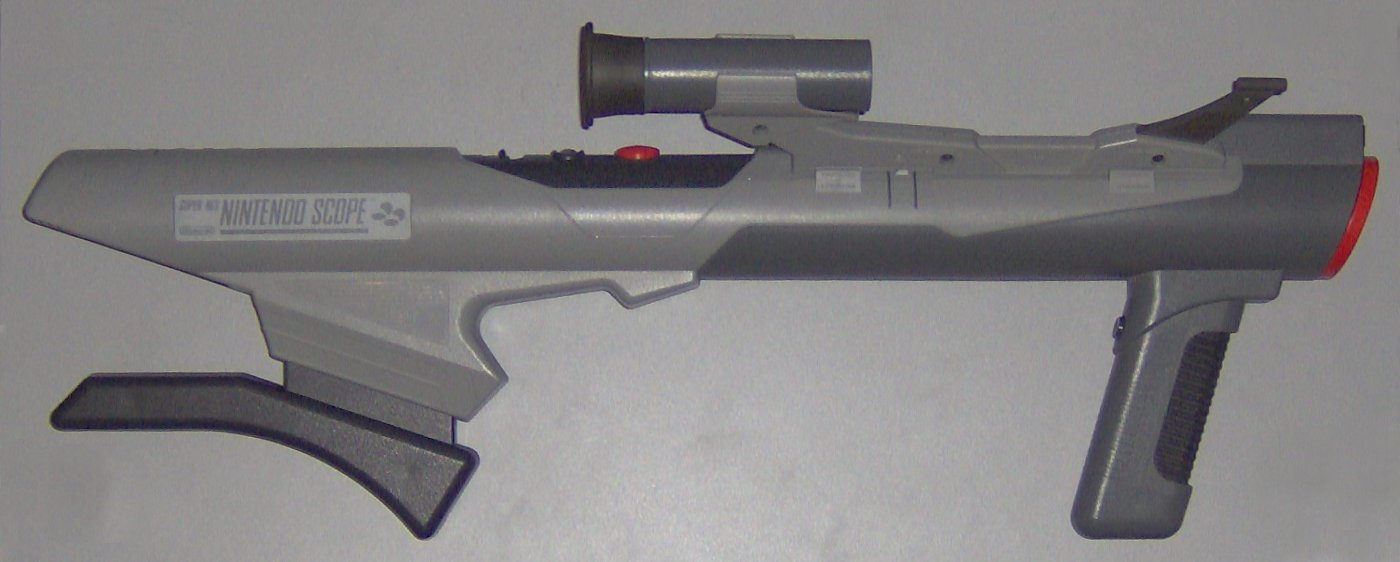
European model with orange firing button

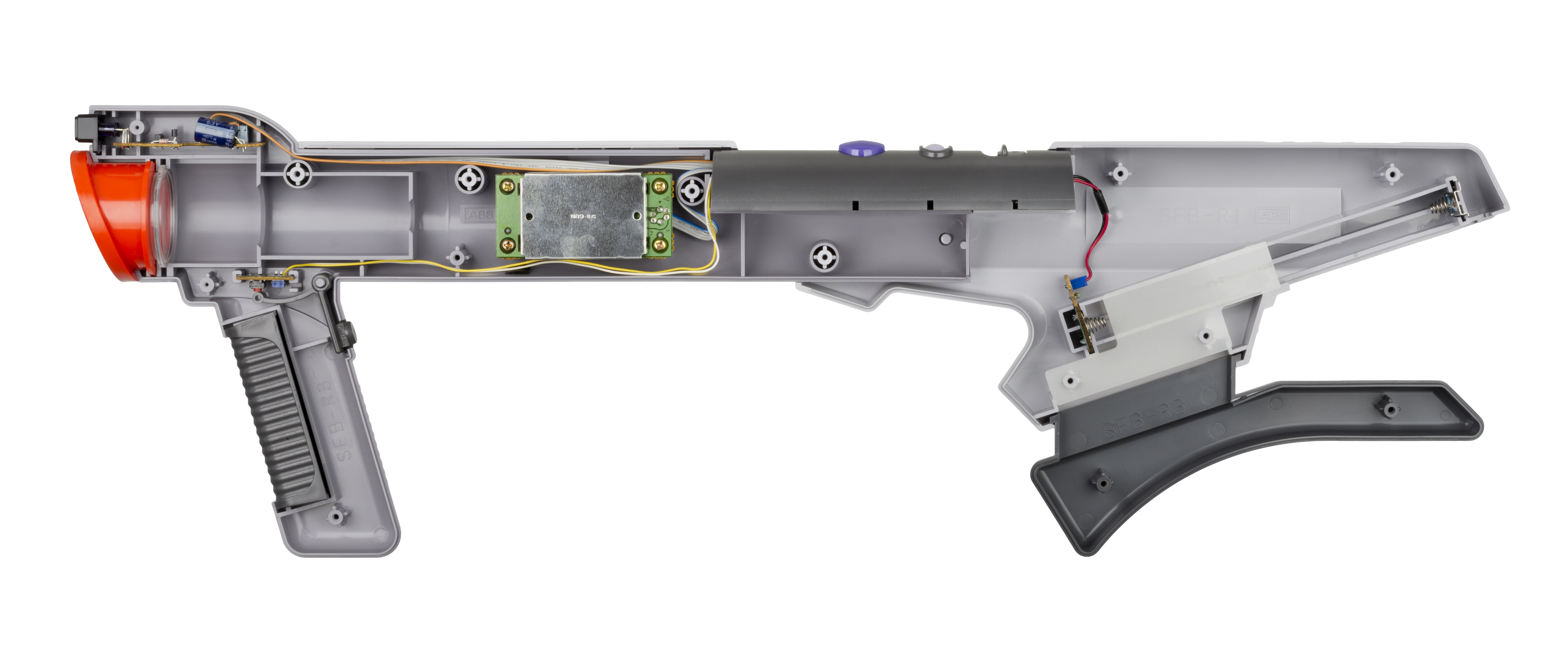
The inside of the Super Scope

The Super Scope is a bazooka-shaped device, just under 2 ft (61 cm) long. Unlike its predecessor for the Nintendo Entertainment System, the Zapper, the Super Scope does not use a wired connection to the system and instead requires six AA batteries for power. Located about midway on top of the barrel are the "Fire" button, the "Pause" button, and the device's power switch, which can also be used to activate turbo fire. In the middle on either side are two clips for attaching the sight. At the far end of the gun, on the bottom, is a 6 in (15 cm) grip with another button labeled "Cursor"; holding this button and pressing "Fire" twice will reset any game to the title screen.

On the end is the infrared receiver lens, approximately 1 inch (25 mm) in diameter, which picks up the light from a TV. The sight mount is shaped like a wide, very shallow "U", about five inches long. The end that faces toward the shoulder mount end of the Super Scope has a round open cylinder holder, where the eyepiece goes. The other end has a short, narrow tube, which forms the sight when one looks through the eyepiece that is in-line across from it. The end of the eyepiece is very simple: it is a cylinder with the diameter of a quarter, with a removable rubber piece through which the shooter looks. The sight is designed so that the aim will be correct at a distance of 3 metres (10 ft). The sight can be positioned on the left or right side of the barrel to accommodate left or right handed play.

The Super Scope comes packaged with a small infrared receiver module, 2.5 in × 2.5 in × 1 in (6.4 cm × 6.4 cm × 2.5 cm) in size, with a standard Super NES controller cord attached. On the front is an oval-shaped black area, receding back from the two sides to an infrared transmitter about the size of a dime. The receiver must be placed above the screen and connected to the system's second controller port for play.

=== Functionality ===
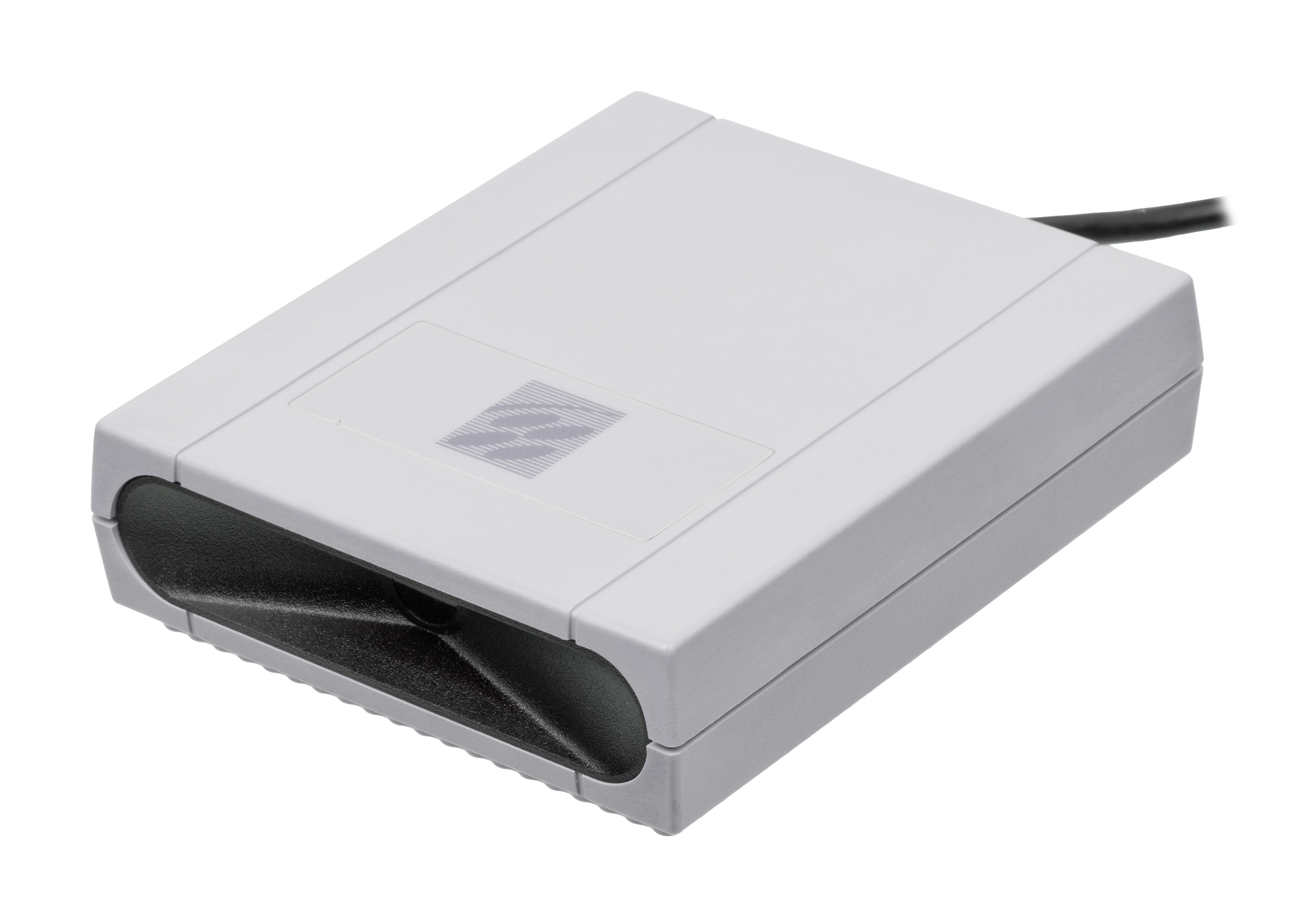
The receiver module that plugs into the second controller port, meant to sit on top of the TV

The Super Scope makes use of the scanning process used in cathode-ray-tube monitors, as CRTs were the only widely used TV monitors until the early 2000s. On a CRT, the screen is drawn by a scanning electron beam that travels horizontally across each line of the screen from top to bottom. A fast photodiode will see any particular area of the screen illuminated only briefly as that point is scanned, while the human eye will see a consistent image due to persistence of vision.

The Super Scope interprets this by outputting a 0 signal when it sees the television raster scan and a 1 signal when it does not. Inside the console, this signal is delivered to the PPU, which notes which screen pixel it is outputting at the moment the signal transitions from 1 to 0. At the end of the frame, the game software can retrieve this stored position to determine where on the screen the gun was aimed. Most licensed Super Scope games include a calibration mode to account for both electrical delays and maladjustment of the gunsight.

The Super Scope ignores red light, as do many guns of this type because red phosphors have a much slower rate of decay than green or blue phosphors. Since the Super Scope depends on the short persistence and scan pattern of CRT pixels, it will not function with modern displays (such as plasma screens or LCDs) that continuously light each pixel.

== History ==
The Super Scope was released in North America in 1992, followed by releases in Japan and the PAL region in 1993. The peripheral came bundled with the video game Super Scope 6, which was created to demonstrate the device's functionality.

=== Compatible games ===
Only 12 games were released that feature Super Scope compatibility, half of which require the accessory for play. Certain games released after the Super Scope—such as Yoshi's Island and Kirby Super Star—display a warning message indicating that the game is incompatible if it detects the receiver is plugged in.

Super Scope compatible games
Title	Year	Publisher	Required	Note
Battle Clash	1992	Nintendo	Yes	
Bazooka Blitzkrieg	1992	Bandai	Yes	
The Hunt for Red October	1993	Hi-Tech Expressions, Inc.	No	Only used for bonus games
Lamborghini American Challenge	1993	Titus France	No	Features an optional Super Scope-exclusive mode
Lemmings 2: The Tribes	1994	Psygnosis	No	A secret Easter egg allows the Super Scope to destroy lemmings
Metal Combat: Falcon's Revenge	1993	Nintendo	Yes	
Operation Thunderbolt	1994	Taito	No	Also compatible with a standard controller or the Super NES Mouse
Super Scope 6	1992	Nintendo	Yes	Packaged with the Super Scope
T2: The Arcade Game	1993	Acclaim Entertainment	No	Also compatible with a standard controller or the Super NES Mouse
Tin Star	1994	Nintendo	No	Also compatible with a standard controller or the Super NES Mouse
X-Zone	1993	Kemco	Yes	
Yoshi's Safari	1993	Nintendo	Yes	

Mario & Wario was also planned to support the accessory, but this was dropped before release.

== Legacy ==
In response to the Super Scope, Sega would release their own light gun peripheral for the Sega Genesis, the Menacer, later the same year. Konami opted not to make the SNES version of Lethal Enforcers (1992) compatible with the Super Scope, instead releasing their own SNES light gun peripheral, the Justifier, in 1994.

During the 1993–94 United States Senate hearings on video games, Senator Joe Lieberman used the Super Scope as evidence of video games promoting violence among children, citing the peripheral's resemblance to a real assault weapon.

The Super Scope has made cameo appearances in other Nintendo games, including as a recurring item in the Super Smash Bros. series beginning with Super Smash Bros. Melee (2001), as a microgame element in the WarioWare series, and as the visual inspiration for the S-BLAST weapons in Splatoon 3 (2022).

A Super Scope was used as a prop in the live-action Super Mario Bros. film (1993), representing King Koopa's "Devo gun", which causes creatures to de-evolve. Images from the film were used to promote the Super Scope's 1993 release in Japan. In the 2026 animated film The Super Mario Galaxy Movie, Bowser Jr. wields a blue Super Scope capable of altering targets' ages.

In 2020, a hobbyist developer created a hardware mod to allow the Super Scope to be used with modern televisions.
