= Kempf (surname) =

Kempf is a surname. Notable persons with that name include:

- Anastasia Kempf (born 1997), German rhythmic gymnast
- Andreas Kempf (born 1967), German curler
- Cecil J. Kempf (1927–2017), United States Navy vice-admiral
- Christopher Kempf (born 1985), American writer and scholar
- Cody Kempf (born 1992), ice hockey player
- Dieter Kempf (born 1953), German economist
- Edward J. Kempf (1862–1947), American politician from Wisconsin
- Florian Kempf (born 1956), American football placekicker
- Franz Kempf (1926–2020), Australian printmaker
- Freddy Kempf (born 1977), British pianist in Berlin
- George Kempf (1944–2002), American mathematician
- Hippolyt Kempf (born 1965), Swiss skier
- Jack Joseph Kempf (1935–2003), Canadian politician from British Columbia
- Jean-Baptiste Kempf (born 1983), French computer engineer
- John J. Kempf (born 1857), American businessman and politician from Wisconsin
- Julije Kempf (1864–1934), Croatian historian and writer
- Karl Kempf (1920–1944), German fighter ace
- Lucien Kempf (1905–1998), American football coach
- Marc-Oliver Kempf (born 1995), German footballer
- Martina Kempf (born 1964), German politician
- Martine Kempf, French computer scientist
- Nicholas Kempf (born 2006), American ice hockey goaltender
- Nikolaus Kempf (c.1414–1497), German theologian
- Paul Kempf (astronomer) (1856–1920), German astronomer
- Paul Kempf (musician) (born 1977), Croatian keyboardist
- Peter Kempf (born 1939), Canadian football player
- Roger Kempf (1927–2014), French philosopher and ethnologist
- Starr Kempf (1917–1995), American artist
- Walter Wolfgang Kempf (1920–1976), German entomologist
- Werner Kempf (1886–1964), German general
- Wilhelm Kempf (bishop) (1906–1982), German Catholic theologian and bishop
- Wilhelm Kempf (psychologist) (born 1947), Austrian psychologist

== See also ==
- Kempf (disambiguation)
- Kempff
- Kampf (surname)
- Kampf (disambiguation)
- Kemp (surname)
