= Fire Emblem: Genealogy of the Holy War =

1996 video game

- Japanese box art featuring Sigurd (top) and his son, Seliph (bottom)
- Developer: Intelligent Systems
- Publisher: Nintendo
- Director: Shouzou Kaga
- Producer: Gunpei Yokoi
- Designer: Shouzou Kaga
- Programmer: Toru Narihiro
- Artists: Katsuyoshi Koya; Mayumi Hirota
- Writer: Shouzou Kaga
- Composer: Yuka Tsujiyoko
- Series: Fire Emblem
- Platform: Super Famicom
- Release: JP: May 14, 1996
- Genre: Tactical role-playing
- Mode: Single-player

Fire Emblem: Genealogy of the Holy War (Note: Japanese: ファイアーエムブレム聖戦の系譜, Hepburn: Faiā Emuburemu: Seisen no Keifu) is a 1996 tactical role-playing game developed by Intelligent Systems and published by Nintendo for the Super Famicom. It is the fourth installment of the Fire Emblem series, and the second to be developed for the platform. Genealogy of the Holy War takes place on the continent of Jugdral, split between eight countries founded by the Twelve Crusaders, an ancient group of soldiers who ended the rule of the ancient dragon Loptous with divine aid. In the present, a cult working to revive Loptous stirs up war among the countries. The story is told over two generations—the first generation follows the Grannvalian prince Sigurd, while the second follows his son Seliph as he works to defeat the cult and avenge his father. Gameplay follows the traditional Fire Emblem system of tactical battles taking place on grid-based maps, while adding the Weapon Triangle and Support systems, which directly impacted both gameplay and story.

Development began after the completion of Fire Emblem: Mystery of the Emblem. Returning staff included director, designer and scenario writer Shouzou Kaga, composer Yuka Tsujiyoko, character designer Katsuyoshi Koya, and producer Gunpei Yokoi; it would be the last Fire Emblem game produced by Yokoi. A greater focus was placed on the story compared to previous entries, although the gameplay also saw new additions. Production was turbulent due to staff moves and the unexpected addition of character romance and expanded storyline. First unveiled under the title Inheritors of Light, it was originally scheduled for a March release, before eventually releasing in May. It met with critical and commercial success. A follow-up title based within the game's storyline, Fire Emblem: Thracia 776, was released in 1999. Many elements introduced in Genealogy of the Holy War would reappear in later titles. As of 2026, the game has yet to be released outside of Japan, but is a choice import title through an English fan translation. The character and location names in the game were localized through the 2017 mobile game Fire Emblem Heroes.

== Gameplay ==
When selected during their turn, each player unit has their range of movement displayed.

Fire Emblem: Genealogy of the Holy War is a tactical role-playing game in which the player takes the roles of Sigurd and his son Seliph across a variety of story-driven missions on the continent of Jugdral. The story is divided into chapters, which are in turn divided between two generations of characters. Before and during missions, the player units may settle in a home base, where various actions can be taken such as repairing weapons, buying and selling items, and participating in arena battles. Castle towns within mission maps can also be visited for similar services.

Battles play out using a turn-based system where each unit on both sides is given their chance to move and act. Characters move and attack within the same turn, and in a few cases units can take two moves in a turn. A key part of combat is the Weapon Triangle, a new addition to the series which governs the opposing strengths and weaknesses of weapon types based on a rock–paper–scissors system - lances are stronger than swords, swords are stronger than axes, and axes are stronger than lances. A secondary system governs the magic system, where Fire, Lightning, and Wind spells have varying strengths and weaknesses against each other with Light and Dark magic existing outside of the magic triangle whilst having an advantage over the elemental magic types. Each unit has a character class which determines their weapons, movement, and which skills they possess. Weapon types also affect battle performance: for instance, axes deal more damage, but weigh characters down more than swords.

The actions taken in earlier parts of a map can affect later parts of that mission, triggering scripted changes in objectives and enemy behavior: for instance, when a castle is seized, the neighboring castle will deploy additional troops. After each battle, a player character gains experience points. When a unit gains 100 experience points, they receive random boosts to their statistics such as health, strength and speed. All characters, with the plot related exceptions, are subject to permanent death if they are defeated in battle, removing them from the rest of the game. If the army's leader is killed or the player's home castle is seized by the enemy, the map must be restarted from a save file, which can be written to at the start of every turn. Victory is achieved upon capturing a specific castle on the map.

Character relationships form a core part of gameplay, and include both optional conversations and story-driven character romances. Conversations see selected characters in the mission map talking with each other, and some romances are triggered by the story when certain characters have joined the party during the first generation storyline. The second generation units have their stat values and personal skills influenced by the assigned attributes of their parents. Second generation units can also form optional romantic attachments, but this only allows stat-increasing conversations. When siblings or married characters are next to each other, they grant a critical hit boost to each other. Married characters can also give their gold to each other if they're next to one another, while thieves can give their gold to any adjacent character, regardless of relationship status. In addition to normal stat growth, some high-ranking units on both sides have a separate "Leadership" rank, which grants stat boosts to all units within three tiles, with the boost increasing with that unit's Leadership rank.

== Synopsis ==
=== Setting ===
Genealogy of the Holy War takes place on the continent of Jugdral, which is divided between eight countries: the Kingdom of Grannvale, the Kingdom of Verdane, the Kingdom of Agustria, the Munster District, the Kingdom of Thracia, the Republic of Miletos, the Kingdom of Silesse, and the Kingdom of Isaach. According to staff, Jugdral is within the same world as Archanea, the continent featured in the original Fire Emblem and its sequels: the events of Genealogy of the Holy War are set hundreds of years prior to the time period of Archanea, with the latter being in a barely civilized state. It was during this time that the Dragon Tribes were debating how to treat humanity. In ancient times in the year Grann 440, the Earth Dragon Loptous made a pact with the priest Galle, who became his vessel for bringing ruin to humanity. By 632, the Divine Dragon Naga had discovered Loptous's part in the gradual conquest of Jugdral, so she chose twelve soldiers to defeat Loptous: this event became known as the Miracle of Darna. The Twelve Crusaders defeated Loptous and his cult, bringing peace to the land in a conflict dubbed the "Holy War"—these twelve would go on to establish Jugdral's countries. The events of Genealogy of the Holy War begin in the year 757.

=== Plot ===
In the year Grann 757, barbarians from the kingdom of Isaach besiege Darna Castle, and Prince Kurth of Grannvale and his friend Lord Byron of Chalphy set out on a punitive expedition. When the southwestern kingdom of Verdane takes advantage of Grannvale's weakened state to invade, Byron's son Sigurd repels them and launches a counter-invasion to rescue his childhood friend Edain, daughter of the Duke of Yngvi, who was kidnapped, and in the process, he rescues Shannan the prince of Isaach, who was used as a hostage to force his aunt Ayra to fight against Grannvale. During the campaign, Sigurd meets a mysterious girl named Deirdre. She is revealed to be of Naga blood, a long-lost member of the Grannvalian royal family, the House of Belhalla, and the descendant of the crusader with the power to defeat the evil dragon Loptous. Sigurd and Deirdre fall in love and marry, and their son Seliph is born in Agustria. At this point, Dukes Lombard and Reptor conspire to seize the throne of Grannvale, murder Kurth, and frame Sigurd and his father for the crime. Sigurd is forced into exile, while the archbishop Manfroy of the Loptr Church kidnaps Deirdre and erases her memories in order to use her to resurrect Loptous. His plan is to wed her to Lord Arvis of Velthomer — the two are, unbeknownst to them, half-siblings, and their union will produce a human vessel capable of hosting the consciousness of Loptous. During their exile, Sigurd and his allies are forced to hide Seliph and the rest of their children from the forces of Arvis and the cult. After a year in exile, Sigurd starts making his way back through Jugdral, killing the Dukes responsible for the false accusation. Apparently exonerated, Sigurd returns to Grannvale, only to learn that Arvis has married Deirdre to become Grannvale's king. Arvis orders Sigurd's allies to be executed and personally murders Sigurd.

Over the next fifteen years, Grannvale expands to hold dominion over the whole of Jugdral, and Arvis styles himself the emperor of Grannvale. He and Deirdre have twin children: Julius, the scion of Loptous, and Julia, the scion of Naga. Manfroy uses the Loptyr tome to corrupt Julius, turning him into Loptous's vessel, while Deirdre sacrifices herself to warp Julia away from Julius. Julius overthrows his father and turns the Empire into a tyrannical regime. At this point, Seliph comes out of hiding to protect a nearby village, revealing his long-hidden existence to Grannvale. Traveling across the lands of Jugdral, Seliph joins forces with the long-hidden children of Sigurd's companions, as well as Julia. Making his way through the countries of Jugdral, he gains support from the surviving powers, and gradually frees Grannvale's conquered territories. Arvis is powerless to subvert his son's rule, and is killed in battle against Seliph. During the course of these battles, Julia is captured and Manfroy and Julius attempt to sacrifice her, as her powers could banish Loptous for good. Seliph manages to save her, and after defeating Manfroy and Julius in battle, Julia successfully banishes Loptous, finally ending his rule and allowing Jugdral to recover from the recent conflicts. Seliph takes his rightful place on the throne as the emperor of Grannvale, and restores power to the surrounding countries with their respective heirs.

== Development ==
Production on Genealogy of the Holy War began after the completion of Fire Emblem: Mystery of the Emblem in 1994. Returning staff included series creator Shouzou Kaga, who acted as director, designer and scenario writer; composer Yuka Tsujiyoko, who had handled all previous entries in the series; and Nintendo producer Gunpei Yokoi. Genealogy of the Holy War would be the last Fire Emblem game produced by Yokoi. Character design was handled primarily by Katsuyoshi Koya, who had previously worked on Mystery of the Emblem: it would be Koya's last work on the series, as both he and Kaga were unsatisfied with the quality of his illustrations. Additional work was done by Mayumi Hirota. This was later blamed upon severe time constraints when compared to the development of Mystery of the Emblem. In contrast, Kaga was enthusiastic about Hirota's work, praising how she managed to capture his visions for the characters. The overall development was turbulent due to a general staff changeover between Mystery of the Emblem and Genealogy of the Holy War, in addition to most of the production team moving offices. According to future series producer Masahiro Higuchi, the initial concept for Genealogy of the Holy War was so different from the typical Fire Emblem game that it was instead dubbed "Holy Sword Emblem Kaiser". This name had to be dropped due to space limitations and other unspecified issues, and as its content was coming more in line with the Fire Emblem series, its title was changed to "Sword Emblem". It was eventually given the Fire Emblem title when its mechanics settled into their current form.

While the last three Fire Emblem titles had used a similar setting, with Shadow Dragon and the Blade of Light and Mystery of the Emblem both being set on the continent of Archanea, Kaga wanted to create something new for his next title. This was for two reasons: he wanted to move beyond the confines of Archanea, and also wanted to try his hand at a large-scale historical drama. Similar to other Fire Emblem titles, the setting drew inspiration from Medieval Europe. The story's inspiration changed, drawing from Norse and Celtic mythology as opposed to the elements from Classical mythology used by earlier titles. Similar to Mystery of the Emblem, the story was split into two halves, with the first half acting as an introduction for Seliph's quest. The story's main theme was how the stupidity of humans could forge history. The focus shifted away from the characters to the overall world of Jugdral, intended to show the scale of the conflict and make it seem like history in the making. While the backstory of Jugdral featured a clearly defined battle between good and evil, the main story's distinction between good and evil was blurred, exemplified by the descendants of the Twelve Crusaders being on opposing sides rather than united. A stated example was Arvis, whose conquests were driven by a wish to end discrimination against members of the Loptous bloodline. Due to this, Kaga did not create a storyline focused on poetic justice and morality, instead aiming for a more realistic scenario. This realism also prompted the inclusion of elements such as patricide and incest, which had occurred in history but were not typically included in gaming narratives at the time. The story originally had three acts rather than two. The missing act would have covered the period between the first and second act, which put a more overt focus on the themes of patricide and incest. Due to time constraints, this third act needed to be cut. In a later interview, Kaga felt that the focus on narrative weakened the gameplay.

The game's initial gameplay concept was for a squad-based tactical game that excluded role-playing elements, but it eventually settled back into the more traditional Fire Emblem style of single combat between units. Narihiro also noted that Kaga kept on pushing for more role-playing elements, to the point that the team felt it was being turned into a full-fledged role-playing video game. The scale of maps was greatly increased due to Kaga's wish for a story that was epic in scope. Adjustments were made to the money, character class and ranking systems to help with balancing, while some unit movements were adjusted to lend greater realism to battles. The "Leadership" leveling system was intended to properly convey the impression of certain characters as leaders without resorting to relying on stat growth. A home base that could be freely explored between missions was initially planned, but most of its features needed to be cut due to hardware limitations, although the base concept remained in the game. The differences between the first prototype and the final build were described by Narihito as "huge", and he estimated that the game had been remade two or three times during development. The Support system, introduced in Mystery of the Emblem, was greatly expanded based on fan feedback, such as conversations between units being triggered depending on various factors to give more backstory to them. The romance system was suggested by Kaga, partly as an expansion of the Support system and partly due to his wish to create an epic story. Some elements needed to be removed, such as how giving gifts affected a relationship, due to space restrictions. According to Toru Narihiro, one of the game's staff, the romance mechanics were inspired in Kaga's mind by the breeding of pedigree race horses. When he asked for the feature, all of the staff were shocked, and it was estimated that an entire year's development was dedicated to making the feature work. Romance also fell in with a popular gaming trend at the time. The systems governing children were intended to reward players through certain character parings, but were also open so players would not need to engage in the romance system at all while still getting enjoyment from the experience.

== Release ==
When first revealed, it was known under the tentative title of Fire Emblem: Inheritors of Light. It was originally scheduled for a release in March 1996. Genealogy of the Holy War was released on May 14, 1996. It is the second title to be released for the Super Famicom. Its Japanese title, Seisen no Keifu, has been alternately translated as "Descent of Jihad" and "Genealogy of the Holy War"; the latter has become the more common translation. It was subsequently ported to other platforms through Nintendo's Virtual Console. It was released for the Wii on January 30, 2007; for the Wii U on April 27, 2013; and August 27, 2016, for the New Nintendo 3DS. The game was not localized for Western release, remaining exclusive to Japan. An English fan translation was developed and released.

== Reception ==
Reception

Review scores
Publication	Score
Famitsu	9/10, 6/10, 8/10, 8/10
RPGamer	7/10
RPGFan	90/100
Super Game Power	4.2/5
Marukatsu Game Shōnen	6/10, 8/10, 8/10

As of 2002, the game had sold a total of 494,216 units during its original print run, becoming the second best-selling Fire Emblem title to that date. In Famicom Tsūshin, the four reviewers each gave the game a score of nine, six, and two eights out of ten. It was the lowest-scoring average score for a Fire Emblem title for the system.

RPGamer's Tony Green praised the streamlined and simple-to-learn gameplay, in addition to its emotional story, customization, and the vivid graphics. His main criticism was laid against the difficulty spike after the first two chapters. He felt that the biggest barrier for players was that of language, due to the lack of an official localization. Nintendo Power, in an import preview of the game, was highly positive: saying that players should "forget about everything [they] know about RPGs and strategy games" when referring to the gameplay, the writer also praised the music, complex storyline and graphics. The editor concluded by calling Genealogy of the Holy War "truly a game of epic proportions".

In a feature on the five best Fire Emblem titles up until 2013, Chris Carter of Destructoid included Genealogy of the Holy War among them due to the many lasting features it introduced to the series. In a retrospective feature about games not released in the United Kingdom, Digital Spy's Damian McFerren referred to it as the best game in the series, decrying its exclusivity to Japan. In a feature for RPGamer, writer Cassandra Ramos called the game the entry she most wished to see released overseas due to its scale and quality when compared to other entries from the period. Both noted that Genealogy of the Holy War was a suitable subject for a remake in the wake of the international success of more recent titles in the series.

== Legacy ==
Following the completion of Genealogy of the Holy War, work on what was originally a side project began in 1998. Titled Fire Emblem: Thracia 776, it was set within the storyline of Genealogy of the Holy War. Kaga, Hirota and Tsujiyoko returning to their staff roles from Genealogy of the Holy War. Thracia 776 was originally released for the Nintendo Power flash cartridge in 1999, then through a standard ROM Cartridge in 2000. It would be the last Fire Emblem title developed by Kaga, as he left to establish developer Tirnanog once Thracia 776 was completed, developing Tear Ring Saga for the PlayStation. Many of the features used in Genealogy of the Holy War would appear in later games: the Weapons Triangle and expanded Support conversations became a staple of the series, while romance and playable characters from different generations became a core part of Fire Emblem Awakening. The concept of an explorable home base was later used in Fire Emblem Fates, under the title of "My Castle", as well as Fire Emblem: Three Houses and Fire Emblem Engage.
