= Kampf (surname) =

- Language: German

Origin
- Meaning: 'Fight' or 'struggle'. An occupational name for a fighter.

Kampf or Kaempf may refer to:

- Arthur Kampf (1864–1950), German painter; (de)
- David Kämpf (born 1995), Czech ice hockey player;
- Dietrich Kampf (born 1953), former East German ski jumper;
- Edward S. Kampf (1900–1971), American federal judge;
- Johannes Kaempf (1842–1918), German politician banker; (de)
- Lars Kampf (born 1978), German football player; (de)
- Laura Kampf (born 1983), German YouTuber, designer, and craftswoman;
- Max Kämpf (1912–1982), Swiss painter;
- Paul Kämpf (1885–1953), German publicist; (de)
- Paul Müller-Kaempff (1861–1941), German painter and lithographer;
- Saul Isaac Kaempf (1818–1892), Austrian rabbi and orientalist;
- Serge Kampf (1934–2016), French businessman;
- Sieghard-Carsten Kampf (born 1942), German politician; (de)
- Warren Kampf (born 1967), American politician and attorney.

== See also ==
- Kampf (disambiguation)
- Kempf (surname)
- Kempf (disambiguation)
