= List of Wagner Seahawks head football coaches =

The Wagner Seahawks college football team represents Wagner College in the Northeast Conference. The Seahawks compete as part of the NCAA Division I Football Championship Subdivision. The program has had 12 head coaches since it began play during the 1927 season. Since December 2019, Tom Masella has served as head coach at Wagner.

== Key ==
Key to symbols in coaches list
General		Overall		Conference		Postseason (Note: Although the first Rose Bowl Game was played in 1902, it has been continuously played since the 1916 game, and is recognized as the oldest bowl game by the NCAA. "—" indicates any season prior to 1916 when postseason games were not played.)	
No.	Order of coaches (Note: A running total of the number of head coaches, with coaches who served separate tenures being counted only once. Interim head coaches are represented with "Int" and are not counted in the running total. "—" indicates the team played but either without a coach or no coach is on record. "X" indicates an interim year without play.)	GC	Games coached	CW	Conference wins	PW	Postseason wins
DC	Division championships	OW	Overall wins	CL	Conference losses	PL	Postseason losses
CC	Conference championships	OL	Overall losses	CT	Conference ties	PT	Postseason ties
NC	National championships	OT	Overall ties (Note: Overtime rules in college football were introduced in 1996, making ties impossible in the period since.)	C%	Conference winning percentage		
†	Elected to the College Football Hall of Fame	O%	Overall winning percentage (Note: When computing the win–loss percentage, a tie counts as half a win and half a loss.)				

== Coaches ==
List of head football coaches showing season(s) coached, overall records, conference records, postseason records, championships and selected awards (Note: Statistics correct as of the end of the 2025 NCAA Division I FCS football season.)
No.	Name	Term	GC	OW	OL	OT	O%	CW	CL	CT	C%	PW	PL	CCs	NCs
1	Randolph Faries	1927	4	1	3	0	0.250	—	—	—	—	—	—	—	0
1	Lucien Kempf	1927	4	1	3	0	0.250	—	—	—	—	—	—	—	0
2; 4	Ray Kirchmeyer	1928–1932; 1937–1941; 1946	72	29	39	4	0.431	1	6	1	0.188	—	—	0	0
3	Frank Spotts	1933–1936	18	1	14	3	0.139	—	—	—	—	—	—	—	0
5	Jim Lee Howell	1947–1953	57	24	30	3	0.447	—	—	—	—	—	—	—	0
6	Bunny Barbes	1954–1956	24	2	21	1	0.104	—	—	—	—	—	—	—	0
7	Mickey Sullivan	1957–1961	42	26	16	0	0.619	18	6	0	0.750	—	—	1	0
8	Robert C. Hicks	1962–1977	147	77	64	6	0.544	41	31	1	0.568	—	—	2	0
9	Bill Russo	1978–1980	30	15	15	0	0.500	—	—	—	—	0	1	—	0
10	Walt Hameline	1981–2014	365	224	139	2	0.616	69	62	0	0.527	5	3	3	1
11	Jason Houghtaling	2015–2019	56	16	40	—	0.286	11	20	—	0.355	0	0	0	0
12	Tom Masella	2020–present	59	14	45	—	0.237	10	26	—	0.278	0	0	0	0
