= Tokyo Mirage Sessions ♯FE =

2015 video game

- Developer: Atlus
- Publisher: Nintendo
- Directors: Mitsuru Hirata; Eiji Ishida; Kaori Ando
- Producers: Shinjiro Takata; Hitoshi Yamagami
- Designer: Mitsuru Hirata
- Programmer: Masanori Kinoshita
- Artists: Fumitaka Yano; toi8; Hideo Minaba
- Writers: Yoh Haduki; Makoto Miyauchi; Aoi Akashiro
- Composer: Yoshiaki Fujisawa
- Series: Shin Megami Tensei; Fire Emblem
- Platforms: Wii U; Nintendo Switch
- Release: Wii U: JP: December 26, 2015; NA/EU: June 24, 2016; AU: June 25, 2016; Nintendo Switch: WW: January 17, 2020
- Genre: Role-playing
- Mode: Single-player

Tokyo Mirage Sessions ♯FE (Note: Known in Japan as Genei Ibunroku ♯FE (幻影異聞録シャープエフイー, Genei Ibunroku Shāpu Efu Ī; lit. 'Illusory Revelations ♯FE'); ♯ is pronounced as "sharp".) is a 2015 role-playing video game developed by Atlus and published by Nintendo for the Wii U. The game is a crossover that combines gameplay, narrative, and aesthetic elements from Atlus's Shin Megami Tensei and Nintendo's Fire Emblem series. It was released in Japan in December 2015 and worldwide in June 2016. An enhanced port for the Nintendo Switch, Tokyo Mirage Sessions ♯FE Encore, (Note: Known in Japan as Genei Ibunroku ♯FE Encore (幻影異聞録シャープエフイー Encore, Genei Ibunroku Shāpu Efu Ī Encore; lit. 'Illusory Revelations ♯FE Encore'); ♯ is pronounced as "sharp".) was released on January 17, 2020.

Taking place in modern-day Tokyo and featuring real-life locations such as Shibuya and Harajuku, the game centers around hostile beings known as Mirages who seek to harvest energy known as Performa from humans and are responsible for several disappearances. The story follows a group of teenagers who become allied with friendly Mirages, based on characters from the Fire Emblem series, and merge with them to become Mirage Masters. Under the guise of the Fortuna Entertainment talent agency, the Mirage Masters fight to protect innocent people from the Mirages and find out who is behind the attacks.

The game was first proposed by Nintendo producer Kaori Ando, who envisioned a crossover between the Fire Emblem and the Shin Megami Tensei series. Although initially reluctant due to their workload, Atlus agreed to the collaboration, and much of the early work went into deciding what genre of game it was going to be and how best to incorporate both series while creating an original game. The production period lasted five years. A notable feature was musical numbers produced by Japanese entertainment company Avex Group.

The game was announced in early 2013, two months after full development began. Its Western release retains the Japanese voice track with subtitles rather than an English dub. Reception of the game was generally positive; many praised the battle system, reactions to the story were mixed, and other elements such as dungeon designs and a lack of Fire Emblem-related elements were criticized along with technical problems. The game was later chosen by critics as one of the best games for the Wii U.

== Gameplay ==
Tokyo Mirage Sessions ♯FE is a role-playing video game (RPG), and a crossover between the Shin Megami Tensei and Fire Emblem series. Set in modern-day Tokyo, the game follows the members of a talent agency during their conflicts with hostile beings from another world called Mirages. To help them, the main cast are allied with friendly Mirages inspired by characters from multiple Fire Emblem games. The game's story is split up into several chapters, with the player also able to participate inside stories for various playable and supporting characters, as well as take quests from non-playable characters (NPCs) in Tokyo. The game alternates between real-world Tokyo and the Idolaspheres—alternate dimensions where enemy Mirages roam.

Players control the main protagonist Itsuki as he explores both worlds, interacting with various characters. Players can spend money earned from battles to purchase restorative items that replenish health points (HP) and energy points (EP). Players can also purchase protective accessories, with shops offering lottery tickets allowing players to win additional items. Players can also find various items in the Idolospheres, either by finding hidden treasure chests or defeating enemies in battle. The Wii U GamePad displays an in-game social app known as Topic where players can receive messages from other characters, keep updated on available Unity fusions, and view a map of each area.

=== Unity system ===
By utilizing a place called the Bloom Palace, players can perform two kinds of Unity ritual to strengthen their party: Carnage Unity and Radiant Unity. Carnage Unity uses Performa, which are obtained in battle by defeating monsters and performing crowd-pleasing techniques, to create new weapons for each character. Each weapon carries four skills which a party member can inherit by earning experience in battle. These include Command Skills, which allow the party member to perform various attacks and spells, Passive Skills, which offer passive stat boosts and effects, and Session Skills, which are used to chain together Session Attacks. Each character can only hold six skills of each type, but if they inherit a skill they already have, it is stacked on top and becomes more effective. Radiant Unity uses Performa that is born from within each party member, either through plot progression and clearing side stories, or by increasing a character's Star Ranking in a battle to grant them Radiant Skills. These are permanent skills separate from those inherited from weapons, and include passive effects such as increased health or extended Session Attacks as well as skills that can be performed in battle.

=== Battle system ===
A battle from Tokyo Mirage Sessions ♯FE, showing the battle arena, main characters, current enemies, and HUD display

The party's activities alternate between events in the real world and exploration through dungeons in the Idolaspheres, each designed around a specific theme. Unlocked by progressing through the story, the party navigates through multiple floors, activating switches and devices to solve puzzles and advance while avoiding traps and encountering or avoiding enemies represented by sprites on the field. The dungeon map is displayed on the GamePad. Once cleared, dungeons can be replayed at any time. Friendly NPC mirages also act as merchants within dungeons. Battles are triggered when an enemy touches the party touched. The player can attack a Mirage on the field to stun it, allowing them to perform a pre-emptive attack or avoid battle.

The game features a turn-based combat system in which party members and enemy Mirages take turns to perform actions such as attacking, casting spells, and using items. The player's party consists of three main characters which, except main character Itsuki, can be swapped out both inside and outside of battle. Similar to both Fire Emblem and Shin Megami Tensei's battle systems, party members and enemies each have strengths and weaknesses against certain types of physical attacks, such as swords and arrows, and elemental attacks, such as fire and ice. The affinities of each party member change depending on the weapon they have equipped.

Session Attacks are combination attacks that can be triggered by targeting an enemy's weakness. If another party member possesses a Session Skill linking to the type of attack used, they will automatically perform a pursuit attack, which may then trigger another attack and so on. For example, if one party member attacks with an ice attack, another party member with an Ice-Elec skill will follow up with an electrical attack. Session Attacks may also be carried out by the enemy if they target a party member's weakness. By building up a special meter through attacks, players can earn SP which can be used to trigger Performance attacks, which can be earned through Unity and by completing side-stories. These are called Duo Attacks which are performed by a partner's Mirage. Dual Attacks, on the other hand, can be triggered during a Session Attack to extend the combo at random times. Additionally, party members can learn Ad-lib Performances which may randomly activate while performing certain skills.

Along with items and money earned from battles, winning battles earn experience points which increase each party member's level and allows them to learn skills from their weapons. Performing well in battles, such as achieving quick victories or successful Session Attacks, increases party members' Stage Level, which unlock Performa for Radiant Skills and opens up new side stories. The game ends, sending the player back to the title screen, if all party members are knocked unconscious by running out of HP.

== Synopsis ==
=== Setting and characters ===
Tokyo Mirage Sessions ♯FE is set in modern-day Tokyo. The story moves between multiple well-known city districts, such as Shibuya and Harajuku. In the universe of Tokyo Mirage Sessions ♯FE, everyone holds energy called Performa that enables them to pursue their dreams. Performa attracts beings called Mirages, who hail from an alternate dimension called the Idolasphere: while some Mirages harvest Performa for malicious motives, others form alliances with humans to protect the real world. Those who form alliances with friendly Mirages are referred to as Mirage Masters. The main casts are employees and associates of Fortuna Entertainment, a talent agency that secretly acts as a hub and recruiting organization for Mirage Masters.

The main protagonist is Itsuki Aoi, (Note: 蒼井樹 (Aoi Itsuki)) a high schooler who by chance becomes involved with Fortuna Entertainment, and is initially uninterested in the business. The other human main characters are Tsubasa Oribe, (Note: 織部つばさ (Oribe Tsubasa)) an optimistic and hard-working classmate of Itsuki who seeks to become a pop idol; Touma Akagi, (Note: 赤城斗馬 (Akagi Touma)) an impulsive friend of Itsuki and Tsubasa working to become an actor in a tokusatsu show; Kiria Kurono, (Note: 黒乃霧亜 (Kurono Kiria)) a famous idol and veteran Mirage Master; Eleonora Yumizuru, (Note: 弓弦 エレオノーラ (Yumizuru Eleonora)) a successful half-Scandinavian actress; Mamori Minamoto, (Note: 源 まもり (Minamoto Mamori)) a cooking show host with a taste for Shōwa period clothing and music; and Yashiro Tsurugi, (Note: 剣弥代 (Tsurugi Yashiro)) a superstar male idol who is initially hostile towards the party and their ambitions. The group is aided by Maiko Shimazaki, (Note: 志摩崎 舞子 (Shimazaki Maiko)) a former model who is the head of Fortuna Entertainment; (Note: Maiko is a former Gravure idol in the Japanese version.) and Barry Goodman, (Note: バリィ・グッドマン (Barī Guddoman)) a strict instructor from overseas with a love of otaku culture. The Mirages who ally with the cast are Chrom, Virion and Tharja from Fire Emblem Awakening, and Caeda, Cain, Draug, and Navarre from Fire Emblem: Shadow Dragon and the Blade of Light. A different Mirage is Tiki, who provides assistance to the Mirage Masters and is portrayed in the real world as a popular "utauloid".

=== Plot ===
In modern-day Tokyo, Itsuki accompanies Tsubasa to a talent audition. Hostile Mirages attack, and the two end up in the Idolasphere where they are attacked by Chrom and Caeda. Itsuki uses his Performa energy to cleanse the Mirages, prompting Chrom and Caeda to join them. With help from Touma and Kiria, respectively partnered with the Mirages Cain and Tharja, they defeat the Mirage's leader. Itsuki and Tsubasa are then enrolled in Fortuna Entertainment at Maiko's suggestion. They are aided by Tiki, who suffers from amnesia similar to the other allied Mirages. Further attacks follow at multiple locations throughout Tokyo, each focusing on leading entertainment and media figureheads being possessed by hostile Mirages: these Mirages are revealed to be servants of a greater power. During one mission, the group rescues producer Yatsufusa Hatanaka, who later keeps a close watch on them. They also gather new allies in the form of Elenora and her partner Virion; and Mamori and her partner Draug, the former partner of and initially possessed Barry. On many missions, Yashiro and his partner Navarre watch and sometimes act as an antagonistic force, before Itsuki persuades Yashiro that he can help him avenge his father, who vanished from an opera performance five years earlier in a Mirage attack that only Tsubasa and Yashiro survived.

Investigating a large Idolasphere portal, Hatanaka reveals himself as a partner to the malevolent Mirage Gharnef, both seeking to revive the Shadow Dragon Medeus through a ceremony dubbed the Opera of Shadows, which will destroy the world's creative energy. Using items called Dragonstones, Tiki recovers her memories, revealing she and the other Mirages failed to prevent the summoning of Medeus into their world. Tiki was banished to the Idolasphere and saved Yashiro and Tsubasa from an attempted performance of the Opera of Shadows five years earlier at the cost of her memory. They further learn that Gharnef and Medeus were defeated in ancient times by the Hero-King Marth using five gems dubbed the Fire Emblem. The group defeats Hatanaka and Gharnef, but their sacrifice, coupled with the offering of Marth's soul, completes the Opera of Shadows and summons Medeus. Traveling to the final Idolasphere realm, Itsuki is fatally injured by Medeus, but the Fire Emblem frees Marth's soul, which saves Itsuki and allows the group to perform the Divine Dragon Naga's Opera of Light and defeat Medeus. The Mirages, with their memories restored and Medeus gone forever, return with Tiki to their native realm.

Alongside the main narrative are side stories involving various members of Fortuna Entertainment, whom Itsuki can help as he learns from working in various sectors of the agency's business. These quests' storylines include Tsubasa working to create her idol persona; Touma's wish to become an inspirational actor; Kiria's discomfort with her softer side, which clashes with her professional identity; Eleanora's attempts to polish her abilities as an actress in preparation for a hoped-for Hollywood career; Mamori pushing to expand her professional range beyond her cooking host role; Yashiro breaking out of his self-imposed personal and professional isolation, culminating in a battle with his father's spirit; the often-tipsy Maiko's efforts to maintain Fortuna's public and private functions; Barry's antics and his growing insecurity after losing his Mirage Master abilities; and Tiki wanting the chance to experience the real world. If all the side stories are completed, a post-credits scene is unlocked where Maiko returns to modeling, and Itsuki is unanimously chosen as the new manager of Fortuna Entertainment.

== Development ==
Tokyo Mirage Sessions ♯FE was the brainchild of Nintendo producer Kaori Ando, who voiced her wish to make a Fire Emblem crossover to fellow producer Hitoshi Yamagami in 2010. Ando's initial vision was for a collaboration between the Fire Emblem and Pokémon series, but this was rejected as a similar collaboration was being developed in the form of Pokémon Conquest. Ando redrafted her proposal and submitted it a week later as a crossover between Fire Emblem and Shin Megami Tensei. Atlus, the developer of the Shin Megami Tensei series, had previously worked with Nintendo on a game titled Itsumo Purikura ☆ Kuradeko Premium for the Nintendo DSi and 3DS. When the project was originally pitched to Atlus in 2010, it was assumed that they were not interested after their unenthusiastic response and later said they were too busy to undertake the collaboration. Over a year later, Atlus inquired as to whether the subject was still open for discussion, and it transpired that they had been highly enthusiastic while still being too busy with other projects. Shinjiro Takada, who was also working on Shin Megami Tensei: Devil Survivor 2, was appointed as a producer. While he had viewed Fire Emblem as a rival and quality goal for his work, he was honored to be given the chance to develop a title related to Fire Emblem. The game's directors were Mitsuru Hirata, who was supporting director on Shin Megami Tensei: Strange Journey, and Eiji Ishida, who worked on both Strange Journey and Shin Megami Tensei IV. Hirata was originally the project's sole director, but seven months after the game's public announcement, Ishida was brought on to co-direct so the amount of work needed for the title could be managed. According to Ishida, it was the company's first original game for eighth-generation consoles. Full development began in 2013. From conception to release, production on Tokyo Mirage Sessions ♯FE lasted five years.

During its early production, what type of game it would become relied on whether Atlus or Fire Emblem developer Intelligent Systems would develop it. One of the problems that needed to be overcome was the form of the initial proposal, which was for a simulation game similar to Fire Emblem developed by Atlus. Atlus, who was better known for making traditional role-playing games, was unsure which series to emulate. The decision was eventually made to create something along the lines of a traditional RPG, so Atlus took on primary development. Their first concept turned out to be a grid-based strategy game with strategic positioning elements similar to Fire Emblem, but they were eventually convinced by Yamagami and staff from Intelligent Systems to keep within their skill set rather than attempting anything radically different. The final product was visualized as a game only Atlus could make, incorporating elements from both series while standing as an original title that could be enjoyed by fans of both Shin Megami Tensei and Fire Emblem. The game's platform was chosen based on the recent successful Fire Emblem entries for the 3DS: as Fire Emblem had appeared on the 3DS, Tokyo Mirage Sessions ♯FE was to be a different "expression" designed for the Wii U. During these early stages, proposals were also made for a 3DS version, but this never materialized. Despite the final product, some of the conceptual ideas were taken from early plans for Fire Emblem Awakening to take place in a modern-day setting. The inclusion of a sharp symbol in the title, which represents a semitone increase in the pitch of a note in musical notation, denoted the game's status as a unique hybrid of the two series. The inclination of the logo was also designed to represent the game's altered perspective on the Fire Emblem series. The game's cutscenes were created by Studio Anima, who handled the animated cutscenes for Fire Emblem Awakening and Fire Emblem Fates, and Studio 4°C.

=== Scenario and design ===
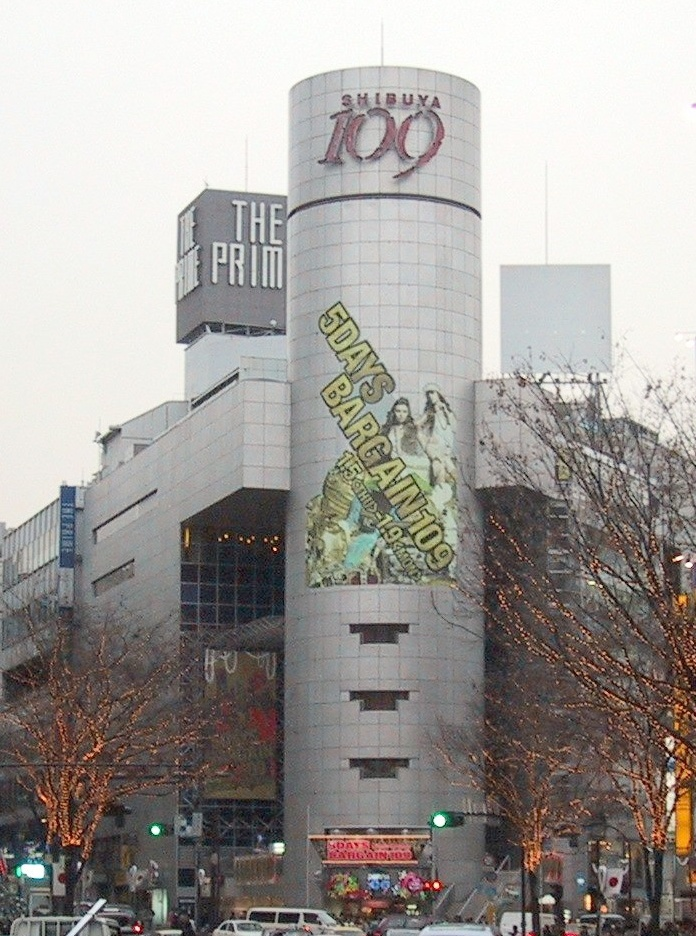
Tokyo Mirage Sessions ♯FE's setting makes use of contemporary locations in Tokyo, such as the Shibuya 109 department store, which was used as the thematic inspiration for a dungeon.

The scenario was written by Yoh Haduki and Makoto Miyauchi. Haduki was in charge of the main narrative, while Miyauchi handled the side stories for the main cast. During the early scenario development, it was thought that the main characters would be reincarnations of Fire Emblem characters, but this was dismissed as it would link it too strongly to the Fire Emblem series. When going through how to help incorporate Fire Emblem characters within the "Atlus mythos", they decided to use a concept from Japanese Shamanism called the "kami oroshi", which stands for a deity possessing and communicating through a priest or ritual dancer. A further extension of this was the incorporation of the kagura ritual dance, which in turn led to the inclusion of the entertainment theme. Inspiration was also from traditional Noh theater. The character of Itsuki Aoi, who is not directly associated with any branch of Japanese media and entertainment, was created to introduce the setting and characters from an outsider's point of view. Itsuki was also a rarity among Atlus protagonists in that he took an active role in conversations with other characters rather than being a silent protagonist.

The side stories were created so the player could better understand and empathize with the struggles of entertainers in the industry and their private lives. Part of the team's struggle was balancing the main story and side missions and making both appealing to players. During an earlier stage, there was no divide between these two mission types, which ended up clashing with major story events and prompting players to ignore the side stories. To counter this, "Intermission" periods were created where side story chapters could be accessed. In the end, the side stories became a large part of the game's thematic base, causing Yamagami to consider them something more. The general infusion of Japanese pop idol culture and the performing arts into the title was Atlus's take on traditions within Japanese Shamanism where the dancing of priestesses brought them closer to the gods they worshiped: in the game, it is through their performances that the main characters draw the attention of the Mirages and summon them into the real world. Also working on the scenario was Aoi Akashiro, a writer whose resume included anime and video games.

Aesthetically, the game used Fire Emblem elements as motifs, but took its setting and premise of a clash between worlds from Shin Megami Tensei. The battle system was originally going to be similar to a Fire Emblem game, but while it did incorporate elements such as the Weapon Triangle, it ultimately became a turn-based RPG battle system. After Atlus was made primary developer, the story was set in modern-day Tokyo and written around a group of young people facing challenges together. Its upbeat focus on character drama was a deliberate shift away from the dark scenarios of the Megami Tensei series. The game takes place in multiple locations around Tokyo, including Shibuya and Harajuku. The modern setting provided challenges for incorporating Fire Emblem characters, as characters in medieval armor just dropping into a modern setting would have looked strange. Among the considered possibilities were introducing Fire Emblem characters as human party members. In the end, it was decided to make them summoned helpers similar to the demons of Shin Megami Tensei, drawn into the real world from their Idolosphere dimension.

To make real-world locations as realistic as possible, the team went on multiple scouting trips, taking photographs of locations like the Shibuya 109 department store. They originally wanted to mimic the chosen areas of Tokyo very closely, but they needed to consider how this might make travel times between locations overly long for players: this was done by incrementally reducing the scale of environments while keeping the scenery and aesthetic intact. According to Hirata, the process of designing Shibuya alone took between one and two years. Battles were designed around the concept of a stage, with an audience made up of Mirages raised into excitement by the party's performance. In-battle rewards of money were designed to be "ohineri" (paper-wrapped offerings) rewarded to the party for their performance. An early version of the battle transition screen was an "assistant director" using a clapperboard, then offering in-battle commentary. These elements were completely cut from the game. Other elements that were cut included a high amount of camera movement during battles and booing from the audience when the party made mistakes.

The game's art director was Fumitaka Yano of Atlus. The main aesthetic chosen for the game revolved around bright colors, a noted shift from the majority of Atlus's previous games. The bright colors were designed to emulate the focus on the entertainment industry, with various shades and effects portraying a colorful world. In contrast, the dungeons were designed around fantasy motifs and meant to embody the Mirages having been robbed of "expression". The game's dungeons were based around real-world locations within Tokyo, and had gimmicks inspired by a chosen location: for instance, one dungeon inspired by Shibuya 109 was themed around fashion. The main characters were designed by toi8, (Note: Pronounced "toi-Hachi".) a Japanese artist noted for his work on .hack//The Movie. When he was approached, he was finishing work on the cover of a light novel and wondering what he would be doing next. While his previous work used a low color saturation, for Tokyo Mirage Sessions ♯FE he used high color saturation suited to its setting. According to Takada, the team asked toi8 to design the world in this way to create "a feeling of both friendliness and splendor". The Mirage characters were designed by Hideo Minaba of Japanese design company CyDesignation, and were based on characters from Shadow Dragon and the Blade of Light and Awakening. They were designed to contrast with toi8's character designs with the deliberate exception of Tiki, having a machine-like appearance. This was due to the long battle the characters had been facing: their armor reflected the dark events they had faced, and parts of themselves unneeded for survival have degenerated. Minaba had been a fan of the Fire Emblem series and encountered difficulties designing the characters. His main aim was to remain true to the original characters while emulating the sharp and dark character style of Atlus games.

=== Audio ===
==== Music ====
From an early stage, Atlus wanted to have Avex Group cooperating on musical numbers. The planned style, which would have vocal themes performed like music videos or sample trailers, needed a level of professionalism the team felt only Avex could provide. The in-game music was composed by Yoshiaki Fujisawa, who was famous for his work on the Japanese multimedia project Love Live!. Fujisawa was contacted in late 2013 by George Aburai, an in-house composer who also worked with multiple well-known entertainers at Avex Group. Fujisawa found the composition difficult as he was more used to composing for television series rather than video games. To help him, Atlus's sound team gave him advice about aspects such as the timing, feel, and emotive elements of tracks. Ultimately, he found the working environment fun and was pleased when he first saw a test video featuring one of his songs. As a central story theme was the entertainment industry, the soundtrack was filled with vocal tunes and "groovy" tracks. The game features stage performances involving the main characters, which were produced and choreographed by Aburai for Avex Group. The performances made use of full-motion capture, and the 3D animation for the choreographed performances was handled by Studio Anima.

Aburai formed a group from various areas of Avex Group to work on production. After forming his team, Aburai worked to analyze the personalities and traits of the main cast to determine how their performances would play out, in addition to other factors such as their professions' impact on their portrayal. The only vocal theme composed by Fujisawa was "Fire Emblem ~Drama of Light~", which used an arranged version of the Fire Emblem theme composed by Yuka Tsujiyoko. The remaining vocal themes each handled by different composers, many either working with or with previous ties to Avex Group. A prominent theme was "Reincarnation", which was the first song to be created and gave Aburai the most trouble as it would set the standard of the game's music. Two notable songs not performed by the main cast were "Distance between you and me" by the fictional idol group Emotional Key, performed by Karin Nanami, Yumi Wakatsuki and Mina Nakazawa; and the in-game anime theme "Dia Sweet Witch" performed by former Idoling!!! singer Mayu Sekiya.

A commercial CD release featuring all the game's vocal themes, Genei Ibunroku ♯FE Vocal Collection, was released on February 10, 2016 by Avex Group's music label Avex Trax. The CD included eighteen songs, all full versions mainly not heard in the game itself. A full soundtrack album, Genei Ibunroku ♯FE Encore Best Sound Collection, was released by Avex Trax on January 17, 2020. The 3-CD album included all the original vocal themes, official versions of the in-game music, and new music and the song "She Is..." from Encore.

==== Casting ====
Due to the performing aspect of the game, the team were faced with the difficulty of finding voice actors and actresses who could both act and sing. Voice actor Ryōhei Kimura was given the role of Itsuki, which he played so Itsuki would lack a strong personality as he was essentially the player's avatar. Itsuki's only two songs were "Fire Emblem (Drama of Light)" and "Smile Smile", which both focused on strong bonds with the other cast members. Actress and singer Inori Minase voiced Tsubasa; Minase played Tsubasa as the opposite of her normal persona, and encountered difficulties portraying her as "normal". Touma was voiced by actor Yūki Ono, who called the role "straight and refreshing". Ono also sang Touma's theme "Jump! Ōga!". Kiria's actress Yoshino Nanjō strove to portray her character in a "cool" way without her coming off as cold, reflecting the character's inner softness. Nanjō found recording the songs strenuous as she was unused to character-based singles. Nanjō's performance of Kiria's song "Reincarnation" needed to be redone around ten times until it fitted properly with the character's personality. Ayane Sakura voices Eleanora, who despite being nervous made an effort to portray the character in a bullish yet clumsy way, pushing to balance her forward manner with making her appealing for players.

Kaori Fukuhara, the actress for Mamori, portrayed her role so the character would sound childlike without being overly childish in her manner and tone. Yashiro's voice actor Yoshimasa Hosoya found singing for the role difficult as he lacked a natural sense of rhythm. Yashiro's main song was made deliberately complex, as the character singing it on stage would emphasise his skills. Tiki's voice actress Sumire Morohoshi found the role difficult due to Tiki's role as an explanatory figure, together with the dramatic elements of her amnesia and wish to experience the real world. Tiki's first song "Beastie Game" drew from multiple musical genres to reflect her status as a Vocaloid. When recording "Beastie Game", Morohoshi was surprised upon hearing her voice processed to sound like a vocaloid. For her second song, "Not A Phantom World", Morohoshi had to record multiple chorus elements which were then layered as backing for the main song, encountering difficulties making all her harmonies work together properly. Yuichi Nakamura portrayed Barry as the group's mood maker, while Maiko's actress Ami Koshimizu worked to make her character both aloof and charming. During voice and song recording, Aburai actively talked with the cast about their vocal nuances and interpretations of each song.

== Release ==
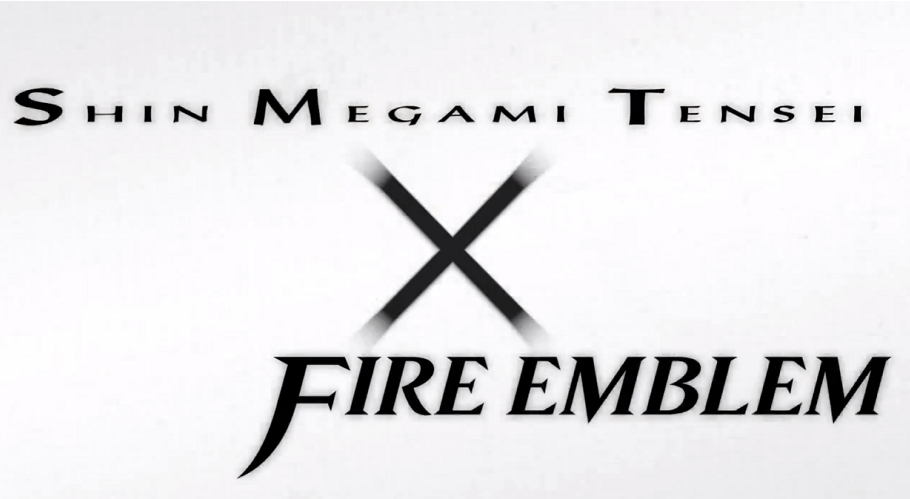
The game was announced under the title Shin Megami Tensei X Fire Emblem.

The game was announced in January 2013 as part of a Nintendo Direct presentation under the English working title Shin Megami Tensei X Fire Emblem, and as one of many planned collaboration projects with third-party developers for the Wii U. The trailer featured artwork of characters from the Shin Megami Tensei and Fire Emblem series, and concluded with the message "Development in Progress". There was much initial speculation by journalists as to the game's genre due to the trailer's vague nature. Atlus confirmed the following day that the game was an RPG, and that it would be developed by Atlus and produced by Nintendo. At the time of its announcement, many parts of the game had yet to be developed and finalized, as it had only been two months since the beginning of development.

The lack of reports after the initial announcement raised concerns that the game had been cancelled. During an interview at E3 2014 concerning Code Name: S.T.E.A.M. and whether its development was affecting Tokyo Mirage Sessions ♯FE, Yamagami confirmed that the game was still in development and on schedule. In April 2015, a gameplay trailer was released during a Nintendo Direct broadcast, which also confirmed the game's Japanese title and release window. The Japanese title, Genei Ibunroku ♯FE, translates to "Illusory Revelations ♯FE". First-print runs of the Japanese release included codes for special costumes inspired by other Atlus games. In addition, Atlus produced a "Fortissimo Edition", containing a special box, an original artbook, a six-track CD release including "Reincarnation", and downloadable content (DLC) outfits for the playable characters. A Wii U bundle was also created, featuring similar content in addition to special stickers and special lyric cards. Between its original reveal and the retail release, Kiria's stage costume for her number "Reincarnation" was altered to be less revealing. DLC was created for the title as both promotional material and post-release content, which included downloadable scenarios including a "Hot Spring" scenario.

An English version was announced at E3 2015, with the release date being revealed in a Nintendo Direct presentation the following year in March. It was released in North America and Europe on June 24, 2016, and in Australia the following day. A limited edition similar to Japan's "Fortissimo Edition" was made available as an online exclusive through Amazon.com and GameStop: it is titled the "Special Edition" in North America and "Fortissimo Edition" in Europe. Aside from the Hot Springs scenario and its associated swimwear outfits, all Japanese DLC was released in the West for the game's launch.

=== Localization ===
Due to the game's Japanese setting and focus, in addition to many people preferring overseas songs in their original languages, the Western version of the game features Japanese audio with subtitles rather than an English dub. Finding English actors to perform the game's songs would also have lengthened the estimated localization time by a whole year. Its localization was handled by Atlus staff rather than Nintendo's internal localization division Nintendo Treehouse. Atlus was chosen over Nintendo due to fan expectation of the type of localization common to an Atlus-published title, and the wish to make the game appeal to long-term fans of the company's work. This placed the game in contrast with the majority of other Nintendo titles localized for the West, where Nintendo's attitude was described as "very hands-on".

Some aspects of the game were changed for its Western release: these changes included the removal or alteration of several revealing costumes, the removal of visual and dialogue references to Gravure modelling, and changes to the ages of certain characters. Multiple sections of dialogue were re-recorded to match these changes. The game's Hot Springs scenario and associated costumes also went unreleased. The removed outfits were replaced with Western-exclusive outfits. Changes to content were attributed to Nintendo's varying content requirements and regulations for the regions the game was released in. Staff later defended these changes as necessary adjustments based on the regions they would be releasing the game in, while working on keeping the core identity intact. After the game's Western release, staff were divided on the issue: Yamagami was positive about the game's adaption for a Western audience, while Hirata was initially disappointed with the alterations before seeing positive responses to the game from Western fans. Following the game's Western release, a fan-developed patch was released that reverted all the localization changes, ranging from cosmetic alteration to script changes.

=== Tokyo Mirage Sessions ♯FE Encore ===
An expanded port for the Nintendo Switch, titled Tokyo Mirage Sessions ♯FE Encore, was released worldwide on January 17, 2020. The port includes new story content and additional party members along with new music. Some new content was also incorporated from more recent Fire Emblem and Atlus titles such as unlockable costumes based on Persona 5, Etrian Odyssey Nexus and Fire Emblem: Three Houses. Previous DLC was incorporated into the base game. As Nintendo were aiming for a simultaneous worldwide release, they decided to use the Western version as their base. Nintendo later issued a formal apology and offered pre-order cancellation options to Japanese buyers for failing to provide information regarding the changes ahead of time. A live concert organised by Avex Group, where the voice actors will perform their songs in front of a live audience, was originally scheduled to take place on June 27, 2020, but was cancelled due to the COVID-19 pandemic.

== Reception ==
Tokyo Mirage Sessions ♯FE (and Encore)

Aggregate scores
Aggregator	Score	
Aggregator	NS	Wii U
Metacritic	81/100	80/100
OpenCritic	82% recommend	N/A

Review scores
Publication	Score	
Publication	NS	Wii U
4Players	84/100	84/100
Destructoid	N/A	8/10
Edge	N/A	7/10
Electronic Gaming Monthly	N/A	7/10
Eurogamer	N/A	Recommended
Famitsu	N/A	34/40
Game Informer	N/A	8.25/10
GameRevolution	N/A	4/5
GameSpot	N/A	8/10
GamesRadar+	N/A	4/5
GamesTM	N/A	7/10
Hardcore Gamer	4/5	3/5
IGN	N/A	7.6/10
Jeuxvideo.com	15/20	14/20
Nintendo Life	8/10	8/10
Nintendo World Report	9.5/10	9/10
Polygon	N/A	9.5/10
RPGamer	3.5/5	3/5
The Guardian	4/5	N/A
USgamer	4/5	4/5

Japanese gaming magazine Famitsu found the story's premise entertaining and interesting, and praised the side stories' focus on the supporting cast. Chris Carter of Destructoid noted that its focus on Japanese culture and similarity to fringe anime such as Revolutionary Girl Utena might put some people off, while Game Informer's Kimberley Wallace called the narrative both amusing and predictable. Cassandra Khaw of Eurogamer praised the character portrayals and the story's inclusion of the entertainment industry's darker elements. GameRevolution's James Kozanitis praised the game's over-the-top display and tone, enjoying the story despite its slow start, feeling that the pace was better suited to players who enjoyed anime. Alexa Ray Corriea, writing for GameSpot, found the story to be "a bit of a cheesy mess", but positively compared side stories to the Social Link systems from the Persona series. David Roberts, writing for GamesRadar, noted the story's lighthearted tone compared to other Atlus projects despite its dark opening premise, and Meghan Sullivan of IGN found the characters bland and the narrative poor compared to other aspects of the game. Nintendo Life's Conor McMahon noted the story's blatant use of its contemporary setting and entertainment theme, praised the side stories and praised the way the personalities of Fire Emblem characters were preserved. Daan Koopman of Nintendo World Report enjoyed the narrative due to its brisk pace and highlights of the Japanese entertainment industry, while Polygon's Janine Hawkins positively compared the story to magical girl anime, calling it "a co-ed version of Sailor Moon for the Love Live! age". Multiple reviewers noted a lack of Fire Emblem references, with several expressing disappointment with this imbalance.

Famitsu praised the aesthetics and user interface design, while Cartar enjoyed the art design despite clear technical limitations. Khaw praised the animated cutscenes, and Wallace praised the character and monster designs despite finding the graphics dated and environments lacking detail. McMahon positively referred to the visuals as "undoubtedly one of its greatest strengths, with every aspect of its visual design firmly planted in the vibrant world of idol culture". Koopman also praised the visuals despite criticizing long load times. The music received praise from multiple reviewers, with several praising both environmental tracks and the musical numbers.

Famitsu generally praised the gameplay, comparing it favorably to the Persona series while also commenting upon its unique elements. Carter greatly enjoyed the combat systems, saying they made up for more formulaic aspects such as general progression, Wallace praised the controls and combat, finding satisfying depth in its systems despite a need to grind for experience points. Khaw enjoyed the mechanics and style of the combat system, and praised the game for its relaxed pace. Kozanitis praised the blending of elements from both series, praising the combo mechanics and character growth systems. Corriea found the overall experience entertaining and engaging, but found boss fights brought down the experience due to becoming endurance tests rather than requiring any strategy. Despite criticizing the limit on skills, Roberts enjoyed the complexity and strategy of combat, praising it for removing the more tedious elements of its parent series. Sullivan praised the combat, calling the Session attacks its best feature and enjoying the overall spectacle and customization systems. McMahon praised the game's unique systems along with its blend of series elements, but found the GamePad difficult to use. Koopman said the battle system "[hit] the sweet spot" between Persona and Fire Emblem in its use of gameplay elements from both series in combination with its unique features. Hawkins also enjoyed the Session attacks, and praised the combat system and growth systems. Several reviewers found dungeon progression difficult due to backtracking or bland puzzles.

=== Sales ===
According to Famitsu, the game debuted at #13 with 23,806 units, having a moderate sell-through rate. At release, the game ranked as #8 in Nintendo's weekly download charts. The following week, it dropped to #16, selling another 9,094 units, bringing total sales up to just under 33,000 units. By mid-January, it had dropped to #27, but its sell-through rate had increased. According to Media Create, the game reached #14 on their charts, with all versions selling 26,340 units. By the following week, it had dropped out of the top twenty. According to Dengeki Online, the game had sold 32,896 units by January 2016. In its first week on sale in North America, the game sold 50,000 units. Upon its UK debut, the game reached #18 in the all-format charts and #16 in single-format.

The Nintendo Switch version, Tokyo Mirage Sessions ♯FE Encore, debuted at #6 in Japan with 18,797 units sold according to Famitsu, while Media Create reports the game debuted at #5 in Japan. In the UK, the game debuted at #17 in the all-format chart, and launch sales are reported to be 17% stronger than the original Wii U release.

=== Awards and accolades ===
Critics were generally positive. The game scored an 80 out of 100 on aggregate site Metacritic based on 62 critic reviews. It was ranked by the site as the sixth best Wii U game of the year. Tokyo Mirage Sessions ♯FE was awarded the Dengeki Online Award 2015: Dengeki referred to the game as a "masterpiece", calling it one of the best recent role-playing game and applauding the evolved Megami Tensei battle system and lighter-toned story. Destructoid awarded it as their best Wii U game of 2016, while RPGamer awarded it for Wii U RPG of the year. It was also nominated for and was the runner-up for IGN's "Wii U Game of the Year" in their "Best of 2016" awards. In Nintendo Life's 2016 Game of the Year awards, the game came third in the "Readers Votes Wii U Retail Game of the Year" category behind Paper Mario: Color Splash (#2) and The Legend of Zelda: Twilight Princess HD (#1). GameSpot ranked it among the best Wii U games of 2016. It has been ranked by Kotaku, USGamer, Polygon and GamesRadar as one of the best video games for the console.
