= Kure Software Koubou =

Japanese video game development company

Kure Software Koubou (呉ソフトウェア工房), or KSK, is a Japanese game development company founded in 1985 that creates games for many platforms, but focusing mostly on home computers. KSK's games are well known for the "Gochyakyara" (ゴチャキャラ "Multiple Character") system which KSK invented, which was a unique hybrid between the real-time strategy, action role-playing game and tactical role-playing game genres. Some of their games also used a European art style in addition to a Japanese anime style. KSK is also famous for having most of the cover art for their games created by renowned artist Yoshitaka Amano.

== History ==
One year after being founded, KSK released their first game Argo for the NEC PC-88. It was a first-person view role-playing video game. Two years later in 1988, KSK released two games, Silver Ghost and First Queen, for the PC-88. These games established the new style of RPG that KSK would then use as the basis of most of their further productions, this was the concept of the 'Gochyakyara' system (Multiple Character System). This was basically an action role-playing game system, but it let the player have a huge amount of party members and allowed for enormous battles as well as strategy video game elements, such as army formations and real-time tactics. This system was very simple yet highly dynamic, and gained such popularity that by 1995, KSK released a further seven titles using this system (Duel98, First Queen 2, Kawanakajima Izuroku, Early Kingdom, First Queen 3, First Queen 4 and Dark Seraphim).

In 1996 KSK then released a game called Duel Succession. This incorporated many elements from the 'Gochyakyara' system, but removed the RPG and action elements making it strictly a war strategy game. In the same year, a PlayStation version of First Queen 4 was released featuring enhanced graphics and sound.

After this KSK then released a new First Queen game in 1999 called First Queen: The New World. This brought the 'Gochyakyara' system into 3D but was not very popular and fans preferred the old style. This resulted in KSK's next game being a remake of First Queen, which was released in 2001. This featured the original game completely redone with new 2D graphics and sound. A year after this in 2002, KSK released a Windows version of First Queen 2, but was just the original First Queen 2 updated to work in Windows, and did not feature remade graphics and sound. Two years later in 2004, a compilation pack of First Queen 3 and 4 was released. This pack included First Queen 3 updated to work in Windows, as well as First Queen 4 updated to work in Windows and featuring the updated graphics from the PlayStation version of First Queen 4 released in 1996.

Also released in 2004 was a game very different from anything KSK had done before. It was a game called Tennis, which was just a tennis game. However, it was not released as a boxed game available in stores, instead it was only available to buy over the internet as a download for a small price. KSK followed this up with a Golf game released in 2005, which is also only available over the internet.

The president of Kure has noted recently in a diary on the KSK website that they were working on a new RPG using the "Gochyakyara" system. This would mean it would be KSK's first proper original game since First Queen: The New World in 1999 (considering everything since then has just been the remakes/updates of the four First Queen games and the Tennis and Golf games were not properly boxed full priced games, just small internet downloads at a cheap price).

First Queen IV (ファーストクイーンIV) was released on the PlayStation Network in Japan on February 9, 2011 and in North America on March 12, 2013.

== Notable games ==
=== Silver Ghost ===
Silver Ghost was an early example of the tactical role-playing game genre, released in 1988 for the NEC PC-8801 computer. Unlike later tactical RPGs, Silver Ghost was not turn-based, but instead used real-time strategy and action role-playing game elements. It also featured a point-and-click interface, to control the characters using a cursor.

The game was later cited by Camelot Software Planning's Hiroyuki Takahashi as inspiration for his Shining Force series of tactical RPGs. According to Takahashi, Silver Ghost was "a simulation action type of game where you had to direct, oversee and command multiple characters".

=== First Queen ===
First Queen (ファーストクイーン, Fāsuto Kuīn) is a real-time strategy role-playing game first released on the X68000 and PC-98 in Japan in 1988, and then for the Super Famicom as First Queen: Ornic Senki in 1994 and Windows as First Queen 1 in 2001. It includes art work by Yoshitaka Amano. The game was also cited by Shouzou Kaga as an influence for his Fire Emblem series. There are three sequels.

== List of works ==
PC-88

- Argo (1986)
- Silver Ghost (1988)
- Duel (1989)

X68000

- First Queen (1988)
- First Queen II (1990)

X1

- Silver Ghost (1988)

PC-98

- Argo (1986)
- First Queen (1988)
- Duel98 (1989)
- First Queen II (1990)
- Kawanakajima Ibunroku (1992, 川中島異聞録)
- Early Kingdom (1992) (with help from C's World)
- First Queen III (1993)
- First Queen IV (1994)
- Dark Seraphim (1995)
- Duel Succession (1996)

Super Famicom

- First Queen: Ornic Senki (1993) (developed by Culture Brain under license from KSK)

IBM AT

- First Queen IV (1994)

PlayStation

- First Queen IV (1996)

Windows

- First Queen: The New World (1999)
- First Queen I (2001)
- First Queen II (2002)
- First Queen III・IV (2004)
- Tennis (2004)
- Golf (2005)
