= Kampf =

Kampf (the German word for "battle", "struggle" or "fight") may refer to:

- Kampf (surname)
- Der Kampf, Austrian socialist journal from 1907 and 1938
- Der Kampf, Luxembourg Communist newspaper from 1920 and 1922
- Mein Kampf, autobiographical manifesto by Nazi Party leader Adolf Hitler
- Contest (1932 film), known in German as Kampf

== See also ==
- Kampfgruppe, a German combat formation
- In Kampf, Polish Yiddish-language weekly newspaper
- Kempf (disambiguation)
- Kämpfer, 2006 Japanese light novel series
