= Kempf =

Kempf may refer to:

- German Army Detachment Kempf, a Wehrmacht formation on World War II Eastern Front
- Kempf's disease or Homosexual panic
- Panzer Division Kempf
- George J. Kempf House
- Kempf (surname)
- Kempf, a character in Fire Emblem: Thracia 776

== See also ==
- Wilhelm Kempff (1895–1991), German pianist and composer
- Noel Kempff Mercado National Park
- Kampf (disambiguation)
