= Fire Emblem: Thracia 776 =

1999 video game

- Developer: Intelligent Systems
- Publisher: Nintendo
- Producer: Takehiro Izushi
- Designer: Shouzou Kaga
- Programmers: Toru Narihiro; Takafumi Kaneko
- Artists: Masahiro Higuchi; Mayumi Hirota
- Writers: Shouzou Kaga; Masayuki Horikawa
- Composer: Yuka Tsujiyoko
- Series: Fire Emblem
- Platform: Super Famicom
- Release: Nintendo Power: JP: September 1, 1999; Super Famicom: JP: January 21, 2000
- Genre: Tactical role-playing
- Mode: Single-player

Fire Emblem: Thracia 776 (Note: Japanese: ファイアーエムブレム トラキア776, Hepburn: Faiā Emuburemu: Torakia Nana Nana Roku) is a tactical role-playing game developed by Intelligent Systems and published by Nintendo for the Super Famicom; it was originally released through the Nintendo Power flash cartridge in 1999, then on a ROM cartridge the following year. It is the fifth installment in the Fire Emblem series, (Note: Sources disagree on the exact numbering: it is variously called the 5th or 6th entry in the series.) the third and last title to be developed for the Super Famicom, and the last home console Fire Emblem until the release of Fire Emblem: Path of Radiance in 2005.

Thracia 776 takes place on the continent of Jugdral. Set in the generational gap within Fire Emblem: Genealogy of the Holy War, the story follows main protagonist Leif as he rallies a private army in an attempt to defeat the ruling Grannvale Empire and restore his lost kingdom of Thracia. Gameplay follows the traditional Fire Emblem system of tactical battles taking place on grid-based maps, but with added elements such as a fatigue system where characters lose energy with each performed action.

Development began in 1998 as a compact side project to Genealogy of the Holy War, although it eventually grew considerably in scale. Series creator Shouzou Kaga acted as designer and scenario writer, the characters were designed by Mayumi Hirota, while the music was composed by Yuka Tsujiyoko. Kaga, Hirota and Tsujiyoko would later leave Intelligent Systems to pursue independent careers, with only Tsujiyoko returning to work on future games. The game was commercially successful upon release, although it was one of the poorer selling titles in the series as a whole. It also received positive reviews from critics. No version has been released outside Japan.

== Gameplay ==
A mission within Fire Emblem: Thracia 776: displayed is a player unit's range of movement during their turn.

Fire Emblem: Thracia 776 is a tactical role-playing game in which the player takes command of a group of units and goes on story-based missions with varying objectives, from defeating specific enemies and rescuing targets to escaping unharmed from engagements. Maps hold a variety of different terrains, from flat plains to mountains; combined with a unit's own abilities, the environment affects movement. There are also locations such as towns and churches where items, in-game currency or health may be granted if a unit uses a specific action there. In addition, a "Fog of War" effect is present in some maps, where the map is obscured to players until a unit advances and reveals the portion of map within their movement and attack range.

Thracia 776 uses a turn-based battle system, where each side acts within their turn to move selected units across a map using a grid-based layout. Units and their alignment or status are represented through colors, with blue units being playable and red units being enemies among others. After a certain point in the game, advance planning for units becomes available, allowing players to pick a group of units to take into a battle. When two units engage, the scene transitions to a separate battle screen where the fight plays out automatically, with each units' stats being displayed below the battle. The battle is won when the map objective is completed: objectives vary from defeating all enemies to defeating specific units or rescuing particular units, or even escaping unharmed from battle. Specific actions such as attacking or opening chests add "fatigue" to a character: should they become too fatigued, they will not be playable in the following chapter. Actions in battle reward player units with experience points (EXP): when one hundred EXP are gathered, the character will level up and their stats will be randomly raised. Each stat is capped at 20 points: stats are divided into health and magic, and passive abilities such as agility, speed and critical hit likelihood.

Each unit is assigned a character class, which affects their assigned weapon, strengths and weaknesses, and range and speed of movement on the battlefield. These classes range from axemen and swordsmen to thieves, to mounted units and magic users such as healers. Some characters, such as main protagonist Leif, have unique classes. Classes also naturally evolve during the course of the story. Mounted units have the option of dismounting their steeds to fight on-foot, and must dismount when inside buildings. Weapons within a unit's selected character class can be freely swapped out for more powerful versions: when mounted units dismount, they swap lances or axes for swords, and they also receive penalties to their stats when dismounted. Weapon effectiveness is governed by the Weapon Triangle: swords are strong against axes, axes against lances, and lances against swords.

== Synopsis ==
Thracia 776 is set within the second generation storyline of Genealogy of the Holy War, while the exiled prince Seliph is still in hiding and preparing to battle Arvis's hold on the continent. Seliph's cousin Leif is the deposed heir to the Republic of Munster, who was rescued from an attack by the forces of Thracia by Finn, a friend of Leif's deceased parents Quan and Ethlyn. Spending most of his life on the run, Leif eventually finds shelter in the village of Fiana. One day, the villager's protectors are routing bandits when Raydrik, the new Duke of Munster, attacks the village in search of Leif, kidnapping Leif's friends Nanna and Mareeta. Devastated by the town's destruction and his friends' abductions, Leif decides to face the forces of Thracia and retake Munster. Aided by Finn and a growing band of rebels, he rescues both Nanna and the enemy-controlled Mareeta, and defeating the forces of both Raydrik and Veld, a high-ranking priest of the Loptous Sect, as they retake Munster and liberate northern Thracia. Leif's forces finally face Raydrik in battle, but upon his defeat Veld transforms him into an undead monster called Deadlord Mus. Leif destroys Mus, kills Veld, and cements his forces defending Munster and northern Thracia from the Grannvale army.

== Development ==
Thracia 776 was created by Fire Emblem series developer Intelligent Systems, designed and written by series creator Shouzou Kaga, and produced by Takehiro Izushi. The music was composed by Yuka Tsujiyoko, who had worked on every Fire Emblem title since the original game in 1990. The characters were designed by Mayumi Hirota, an artist who had worked on Genealogy of the Holy War and took over as character designer from Koya Katsuyoshi after the latter left Nintendo. Kaga chose her after being favorably impressed by her drawing abilities, and brought her on board for both Genealogy of the Holy War and Thracia 776. Kaga came to refer to Thracia 776 as one of the two best titles in the series to that point alongside Genealogy of the Holy War. It would be the last time Kaga and Hirota worked on the series, as both left Intelligent Systems after the completion of Thracia 776, and would go on to develop Tear Ring Saga for the PlayStation. Tsujiyoko also left to pursue a freelance career, but she would return to create and supervise music for future Fire Emblem games including The Binding Blade and Fire Emblem Fates.

Development of Thracia 776 started around the beginning of 1998, with the initial plan being for a compact side project to Genealogy of the Holy War. Development was also supposed to end a considerable time prior to its eventual release date, but as the game evolved, the staff felt the need to keep going and create a full Fire Emblem title. This in turn caused difficulties with keeping the game within the world of Genealogy of the Holy War, with Kaga commenting that it would have been simpler to create a completely original title if they had known how big the project would become. Characters were intentionally given little buildup or backstory, leaving their individual personalities for players to imagine. As the strategic war simulation elements of Genealogy of the Holy War had suffered due to the goal of creating an intricate story, Kaga this time switched his focus to the gameplay. The basic structure was taken from Mystery of the Emblem, with additional elements such as branching pathways within maps and variations in unit movement. This was achieved by giving each map a different algorithm to work with. The fatigue system was introduced to challenge players further.

== Release ==
Thracia 776 was first released through the Nintendo Power flash cartridge system. The original version was released on September 1, 1999. In addition to its standard release, a pre-written cartridge as part of a "DX Pack" was made available. A version for the Super Famicom's standard ROM Cartridge was announced in December 1999, three months after the initial release. This version was released on January 21, 2000. It was the third and final Fire Emblem title to be developed for the Super Famicom, following Mystery of the Emblem and Genealogy of the Holy War. Thracia 776 was the last Fire Emblem game to be developed for home consoles until Fire Emblem: Path of Radiance in 2005, and was purportedly one of the last original Super Famicom games to be developed. Thracia 776 has never been released outside Japan, but an English fan translation that translated crucial story elements was released in 2007. A more complete fan translation with translated menus and improved dialogue and title translations, Project Exile, was completed and released on May 31, 2019. The title was re-released digitally through Nintendo's Virtual Console service in Japan, for the Wii on July 15, 2008, and for Wii U on July 10, 2013.

== Reception and legacy ==
Reception

Review scores
Publication	Score
Famitsu	8/10, 9/10, 8/10, 10/10
Nintendojo	9.9/10

Upon release, the Nintendo Power version proved highly popular, with people coming in high numbers to stores supplying it. This was attributed to the popularity of the Fire Emblem series. It was the best-selling Super Famicom game of September. By November the following year, it was reported to be the most popular Nintendo Power title within that period. Combined sales of its Nintendo Power and ROM Cartridge releases reached 106,108 units as of 2002, making Thracia 776 the worst-selling Fire Emblem game at the time. An alternate estimate by Famitsu at the end of 1999 put total sales at 145,600 units, ranking as the 103rd best-selling game title of the year. According to Famitsu, it was the highest-selling Super Famicom release of that year.

Four reviewers from Famitsu magazine reviewewd the game. The reviewers were both positive about its further refinements and additions to the Fire Emblem gameplay formula, and surprised by the greatly increased difficulty level when compared to the previous entry. Kerry Brunskill of Nintendo Life again noted the steep difficulty even when compared to other Fire Emblem entries, but also positively noted its sound gameplay base and praised its "well thought out" story. Nintendojo's Desmond Gaben gave Thracia 776 a score of 9.9/10 in his review: he praised the graphics as some of the best on the system, generally approved of the gameplay improvements despite its high difficulty, and called it a "must-have" for fans of the genre. The game was noted by website RacketBoy as both a rarity due to its release media and recognized alongside the other Super Famicom Fire Emblem titles as a quality game. TechnologyTell included among their lists of the top Super Famicom games that had not been released overseas.
