= Tear Ring Saga =

2001 tactical role-playing video game

- Developer: Tirnanog
- Publisher: Enterbrain
- Director: Takashi Suzuki
- Producers: Akira Yamazaki; Ichiro Sugiyama
- Designer: Shouzou Kaga
- Artist: Mayumi Hirota
- Writer: Shouzou Kaga
- Composers: Minako Seki; Yoshio Ueno; Hitomi Tachibana; Seiichi Kyoda
- Platform: PlayStation
- Release: JP: May 24, 2001
- Genre: Tactical role-playing
- Mode: Single-player

Tear Ring Saga: Chronicles of War Hero Yutona (Note: Japanese: ティアリングサーガ ユトナ英雄戦記, Hepburn: Tia Ringu Sāga Yutona Eiyū Senki) is a tactical role-playing game developed by Tirnanog, a development studio started by Shouzou Kaga, the creator of the Fire Emblem series, after he left Intelligent Systems' development team in 1999. The game featured a complicated development and initial release period, with the company receiving legal pressure multiple times from Nintendo, who felt that the game's very similar gameplay and presentation, which also featured the art of Fire Emblem: Thracia 776 artist Mayumi Hirota, infringed on their copyrights on their Fire Emblem intellectual property. Direct ties to Fire Emblem were dropped, and its original title, Emblem Saga, was changed to its final title as to not sound so similar to Fire Emblem, and the game was released in Japan on May 24, 2001, by Enterbrain, for Nintendo's competitor, Sony, on their PlayStation console. Three months after release, Nintendo took them to court over the game, and while Enterbrain was ordered to pay a fee, they ultimately retained the right to sell the game.

The game was viewed as a success, selling over 345,000 copies in its first three months of sale in Japan. Kaga and Tirnanog went on to release a vastly overhauled sequel, Tear Ring Saga: Berwick Saga, in 2005 for the PlayStation 2, though the title sold less and was ultimately the last game for the company and series.

== Gameplay ==
Gameplay screenshot.

Tear Ring Saga is a tactical RPG with gameplay very similar to the gameplay found in the Fire Emblem series of video games. The game was created as a spiritual sequel to Fire Emblem by the game's creator, Shouzou Kaga, who no longer had the rights to the Fire Emblem intellectual property upon leaving Intelligent Systems and Nintendo. The game shares the same interface, graphical and music style, and overall gameflow. The game involves the player moving characters in a turn based fashion across a large grid from a top-down perspective. The player is tasked with certain objectives, commonly fighting and defeating an entire opposing faction, or a particular member or leader of a faction.

There are two protagonists in the game, Runan and Holmes, each with their own army to command. Though the two armies travel separately for the majority of the game, they cross paths at several points of the story, allowing the player to switch allocations of fighters and items amongst the two groups. Runan's story follows a strict set of scenarios where he battles against an enemy empire, while Holmes' scenario allows for more freedom, allowing the player to ignore the main scenarios in favor of gathering treasure and increase the army's strength.

== Plot ==
The game takes place on an island continent called Riberia, which had long been divided and ruled under four kingdoms. However, these kingdoms were destroyed by the evil Zoa Empire and its devil-worshipping ruler, and the island was starting to regress into a period of instability and darkness. The Rīve Kingdom was one of the four kingdoms of Riberia, and the first protagonist, Runan (リュナン, Ryunan), is the prince of Razelia; one of the principalities within the kingdom. After the fall of his father's principality, he escaped and went into hiding in a nearby port-town. This town also fell into the hands of the Empire, and Runan and Holmes (ホームズ, Hōmuzu), the prince of another one of the kingdom's principalities, retreat to the newly created Uelt Kingdom with a small contingent of troops. The two receive assistance from the Uelt king, and begin a long journey to destroy the evil empire.

== Development and release ==
The origins of the game's development traces back to the creation of Nintendo and Intelligent Systems's Fire Emblem. The series was first created by Shouzou Kaga, who worked on the first five titles in the series, from 1990's Fire Emblem: Shadow Dragon and the Blade of Light to 1999's Fire Emblem: Thracia 776. Upon the completion of the fifth title, Kaga decided to leave Intelligent Systems in order to work on games on his own. He founded a new company, Tirnanog in 2000, and shortly after announced their first title, the similarly titled Emblem Saga, for Nintendo's market rival Sony on their PlayStation console. The game was initially announced for a March 2001 release, though the game was later delayed to May 24 in order to polish up the gameplay and add some new content. Prior to the game's release, Tirnanog began receiving legal pressure from Nintendo, who were unhappy about making such an extremely similar game, in both name and concept, for their direct competitor, stating they felt that it "was used deliberately for promotional purposes...bringing false recognition to users". This led to the team changing the name of the title to Tear Ring Saga and removing any direct references to Fire Emblem a month and a half prior to release.

While these initial changes allowed the game to be released as scheduled on May 24, 2001, Nintendo sued Tirnanog and publisher Enterbrain for still infringing on game licenses and copyrights shortly after release in July. Nintendo sought for over 258.3 million yen in damages, (roughly equivalent to 2 million dollars at the time) and to prohibit sale and distribution of the game. The first trial ended in November 2002, where the Tokyo District Court turned down Nintendo's claims. Nintendo filed a second lawsuit on appeal, and the second trial began three months after the first, this time under the Tokyo High Court. The second trial ended in November 2004, and Enterbrain was ordered to pay a fine of 76 million yen to Nintendo. However, the game was not ruled as a breach of copyright, and copies remained in stores. Nintendo and Intelligent Systems made another appeal to the Japanese Supreme Court, where the second ruling was upheld.

The game was released on May 24, 2001 in Japan. Two official game guides were released in June and July 2001, both by Enterbrain. A novelized version of the game has also been released by Famitsu Bunko in 4 volumes between 2001 and 2006 (the release of the final volume was prolonged for over a year due to the lawsuit by Nintendo). The game's soundtrack was released in a two disc set by Scitron on June 20, 2001.

== Reception ==
Reception

Review score
Publication	Score
Famitsu	32/40

On release, Famitsu magazine scored the game a 32 out of 40. Hardcore Gaming 101 praised the game for successfully emulating the Fire Emblem formula, stating that "for a clone, it's exceptionally well done, and the 32-bit graphics of the PlayStation look significantly better than any of the 2D entries in the Fire Emblem series". RPGFan praised the game's soundtrack, favorably comparing it to Hitoshi Sakimoto's music for Final Fantasy Tactics, though conceding that they thought a game released so late in the PlayStation's life cycle would take better advantage of the system's sound system, nor did they approve of the game's vocal theme song.

The game was viewed as a success, selling more than 345,000 copies by July 2001.

== Legacy ==
Kaga and Tirnanog's legal victory allowing them the release of the game despite its obvious similarities to Nintendo's Fire Emblem, was seen as setting a precedent for it being acceptable for original creators to make very similar spiritual sequels without the consent or involvement from their original parent companies. USGamer cited the victory as reason as to why future similar situations were allowed, such as Bungie leaving Microsoft and the Halo series behind in order to release the similar Destiny, and Keiji Inafune leaving Capcom and the Mega Man series in order to create the similar Mighty No. 9. Nintendo Life similarly compared the situation to Koji Igarashi creating a Castlevania spiritual sequel with Bloodstained after leaving Konami. The legal proceedings with the game is also suspected to be the reason for why Nintendo's proposed entry to the series around the time, Fire Emblem 64, was eventually cancelled.

== Sequel ==
Four years after the original release, the series received a second Japanese-only entry, a sequel titled Tear Ring Saga: Berwick Saga (ティアリングサーガーシリーズ ベルウィックサーガ, Tia Ringu Sāga Shirīzu Beruwikku Sāga). The sequel was released for the PlayStation 2 on May 26, 2005. While it still largely played as a tactical RPG, the game featured fundamental differences from the first game, including character movement operating on a hexagonal layout instead of a square grid, being able to temporarily recruit mercenaries by interacting with them, and being able to recruit them permanently if certain criteria are met. Berwick Saga debuted at no. 2 on the Japanese weekly charts, but sold far less than its predecessor, selling only 84,000 copies at the end of its first week. Analysts suggest the dip in sales was due to launching at the same week as a number of other Japanese titles, including Namco X Capcom, SD Gundam G Generation DS and Hanjuku Hero IV. The game was well received, with Tim Rogers of Kotaku listing it as an honorable mention in their list of the best PlayStation 2 games of all time, stating that it was "probably the best tactical strategy RPG [he] ever had the pleasure of playing". Despite this, it would be the last game in the series. Kaga took a hiatus after the release of the game, lasting a decade until the production and release of Vestaria Saga in 2016, the first game in a new series of tactical RPGs.
