= Wilhelm Kempf =

Austrian psychologist (born 1947)

Wilhelm Kempf (born 1 June 1947) is an Austrian born psychologist and peace researcher who has made significant contributions to theoretical psychology, psychological methodology and peace research. Alongside of Johan Galtung, Kempf is one of the founders of the concept of peace journalism, which he, in contrast to Galtung, however, does not conceive of as a form of advocacy journalism, but rather understands as a trans-disciplinary research program which has as its object the possibilities of and limits to maintaining journalistic quality norms during war and crisis situations, and to overcome the communication barriers between the conflict parties.

Kempf graduated in sociology from the Institute of Advanced Studies (Vienna) (Diploma, 1970), earned a PhD in psychology, philosophy and statistics at the University of Vienna (Dr. phil, 1970) and achieved his postdoctoral qualification for a professorship in psychology (Habilitation) at the University of Erlangen-Nuremberg, Germany (Dr. phil. habil., 1977). Immediately upon completing his Habilitation he was called to a chair in psychological methodology by the University of Konstanz, Germany, where he founded the Peace Research Group Konstanz, which he has directed up until today. Since 2002 he has edited the trans-disciplinary peace research journal conflict & communication online.

Kempf studied under Hubert Rohracher, whose concept of psychology as a science of man’s subjective world has lastingly stamped his scientific work, as well as under Gerhard H. Fischer, who awakened his interest in psychometrics. Under the influence of Hans Werbik and Paul Lorenzen, however, he soon also began to do research on the epistemology of social science and developed a constructivist foundation for psychological peace research that later grew into a comprehensive empirical and experimental research activity which focuses on the cognitive-emotional representation of conflicts and their influence on the escalation dynamic of conflicts. Placing the principles of quantitative and qualitative social research on a common methodological basis, and combining competing research paradigms into a homogeneous whole, the methods for a social-psychological reconstruction of subjective reality, which Kempf developed in this context, have implications beyond the disciplinary boundaries of psychology, and found applications in other disciplines as well, e.g. in pedagogy and media research.

== Bibliography (selection) ==
- 1977. Mathematical Models for Social Psychology. New York, Wiley (with B. Repp).
- 1978. Konfliktlösung und Aggression. Zu den Grundlagen einer psychologischen Friedensforschung. Bern, Huber.
- 1982. Aggression. Naturwissenschaftliche und kulturwissenschaftliche Perspektiven der Aggressionsforschung. Bern, Huber (with R. Hilke).
- 1990. Medienkrieg oder »Der Fall Nicaragua« Politisch-psychologische Analysen über US-Propaganda und psychologische Kriegsführung. Hamburg, Argument.
- 1994. Manipulierte Wirklichkeiten. Medienpsychologische Untersuchungen der bundesdeutschen Presseberichterstattung im Golfkrieg. Münster, LIT.
- 1997. Psychologie. Eine Einführung. Grundlagen, Methoden, Forschungsfelder. München, dtv (with J. Straub and H. Werbik).
- 1998. Krieg, Nationalismus, Rassismus und die Medien. Münster, LIT (with I. Schmidt-Regener).
- 2000. Konflikt und Gewalt. Münster, agenda.
- 2001. Los Medios y la Cultura de Paz. Berlin, regener (with S. Gutiérrez Villalobos).
- 2002. Journalism and the New World Order. Vol. II. Studying War and the Media. Göteborg, Nordicom (with H. Luostarinen).
- 2003. Constructive Conflict Coverage – A Social Psychological Approach. Berlin, regener.
- 2003-2009. Forschungsmethoden der Psychologie. Zwischen naturwissenschaftlichem Experiment und sozialwissenschaftlicher Hermeneutik. Berlin, regener.

- Band 1: Theorie und Empirie (2003).

- Band 2: Quantität und Qualität (2008).

- Band 3: Natur und Kultur (2009, with M. Kiefer).

- 2008. The Peace Journalism Controversy. Berlin, regener.
- 2010. Readings in Peace Journalism. Foundations – Studies – Perspectives. Berlin, regener.
- 2012. Item-Response-Modelle in der sozialwissenschaftlichen Forschung. Berlin, regener (with R. Langeheine).
- 2014. The Israeli-Palestinian Conflict: War Coverage and Peace Journalism. Berlin, regener (with D. Shinar).
- 2015. Israelkritik zwischen Antisemitismus und Menschenrechtsidee. Eine Spurensuche. Berlin, regener.
- 2021. Friedensjournalismus. Grundlagen, Forschungsergebnisse und Persperktiven. Baden-Baden, Nomos.
