= Max Kämpf =

Swiss painter

- Born: 15 May 1912; Basel, Switzerland
- Died: 26 September 1982 (aged 70); Basel, Switzerland
- Known for: Painting, drawing, murals, fresco painting

Max Kämpf (15 May 1912 – 26 September 1982) was a Swiss painter. Active in Basel from the 1930s onward, he worked in painting, drawing and fresco and was a founding member of the Basel artists' group Kreis 48.

== Biography ==
Max Kämpf was born in Basel on 15 May 1912. After training as a decorative painter between 1927 and 1930, he studied at the Basel School of Applied Arts in 1937 and 1938 before working as a freelance artist. During his apprenticeship, Kämpf copied paintings by Old Masters, and in the early 1930s he produced his first important independent works.

In 1948, Kämpf became a founding member of the Basel artists' group Kreis 48, which placed the representation of the human figure at the centre of its artistic programme. He died in Basel on 26 September 1982.

== Work ==
In the 1930s, Kämpf was influenced by the muted palette of the older Basel generation. His works from this period explored the lives of disadvantaged people and fundamental human situations, expressed through a restrained use of colour.

During the late 1930s and 1940s, Kämpf repeatedly returned to subjects including self-portraits, children, families, landscapes, architecture and masked figures. Allegorical themes also appeared in depictions of flying people, biblical figures and symbolic landscapes. Memory was a recurring theme in his work, which depicted subjects including beggars, emigrants, Native Americans and boys between childhood and adulthood, while works such as Hölle addressed memories of war.

Kämpf worked in fresco as well as oil painting. After 1960, he frequently painted on roof tiles, and in the final decades of his career drawing became increasingly important within his work.

== Exhibitions ==
In 2012, Kunstmuseum Basel marked the centenary of Kämpf's birth with Fokus: Max Kämpf, an exhibition of paintings and drawings from its collection, supplemented by sculpture and prints.

In 2023, works by Kämpf were included in Kreis 48, a Kunstmuseum Basel exhibition marking the 75th anniversary of the Basel artists' group.

== Legacy ==
In 2019, Max Kämpf-Platz, a public square in Basel's Erlenmatt district, was officially opened and named in his honour.
