= Fire Emblem: Mystery of the Emblem =

1994 video game

- Developer: Intelligent Systems
- Publisher: Nintendo
- Director: Shouzou Kaga
- Producer: Gunpei Yokoi
- Designer: Shouzou Kaga
- Programmer: Toru Narihiro
- Artist: Katsuyoshi Koya
- Writer: Shouzou Kaga
- Composer: Yuka Tsujiyoko
- Series: Fire Emblem
- Platform: Super Famicom
- Release: JP: January 21, 1994
- Genre: Tactical role-playing
- Mode: Single-player

Fire Emblem: Mystery of the Emblem (Note: Japanese: ファイアーエムブレム 紋章の謎, Hepburn: Faiā Emuburemu: Monshō no Nazo), known in Japan as Fire Emblem: Monshō no Nazo, is a 1994 tactical role-playing video game developed by Intelligent Systems and published by Nintendo for the Super Famicom. It is the third installment of the Fire Emblem series, and the first to be developed for the Super Famicom. The story is divided into two parts: the first is a retelling of Fire Emblem: Shadow Dragon and the Blade of Light, while the second is an original story acting as a sequel to the first game. After defeating the sorcerer Gharnef and the Dark Dragon Medeus, peace is restored to Archanea and Marth restores his kingdom. His ally Hardin ascends to the throne of Archanea, but begins hostile military expansion across the continent, forcing Marth to confront his old friend and the force driving him. Gameplay follows the traditional Fire Emblem system of tactical battles taking place on grid-based maps.

Mystery of the Emblem began development in 1992 during the production of Fire Emblem Gaiden. The staff from previous entries, including series creator Shouzou Kaga and composer Yuka Tsujiyoko, returned to their respective roles. While originally conceived as two separate projects, the team eventually merged the proposed remake of Shadow Dragon and the Blade of Light with the original story content of Mystery of the Emblem. The gameplay returned to the formula of the original Fire Emblem game, which the more experimental Gaiden had veered away from in many regards. The difficulty was also lowered to encourage new players to try the series.

The game has been positively received by video game journalists; much praise went to its gameplay refinements and technical quality. It also set the best first-week sales for the series until Fire Emblem Awakening in 2012, and with 776,338 units by 2002 was the best-selling title in the series to that date. A derivative title for the Satellaview, BS Fire Emblem, was released during 1997. A full remake for the Nintendo DS, Fire Emblem: New Mystery of the Emblem, was released in 2010. In 2017, it was rereleased in Japan as part of the Japanese retailer versions of Classic SNES Edition.

== Gameplay ==
A battle in Mystery of the Emblem: during the player turn, a character is being moved across the battle map to attack an enemy unit.

Fire Emblem: Mystery of the Emblem is a tactical role-playing video game where players take control of Marth's army and Marth himself, the main protagonist of Fire Emblem: Shadow Dragon and the Blade of Light, across story-driven missions on the continent of Archanea. In between battles, characters engage in conversations with each other in cutscenes, which advances the story.

Battles are turn-based and take place on grid-based maps. Victory is achieved when an enemy base is captured or all enemies are defeated. Each character holds four weapons and four items, and each has an assigned character class, which affects their movement range, damage and what weapons can be used. Mounted units also have the option to dismount, which changes their abilities and stats while reducing movement range.

When combat is initiated, a separate screen shows the battle play out: attack power is based on the strength of weapons and their units, while damage is calculated based on both the type of attack used and the opposing unit's physical and magical defense. Critical hits triple the damage of normal attacks. Each battle awards experience points, which raise a unit's experience level: their level and statistics cap at 20. When a character changes class, their experience level returns to 1 while their stats increase slightly. Unit abilities can be influenced through a Support system: when two characters have a story-based relationship such as being lovers or friends, they boost stats such as attack power or dodging ability.

== Plot ==
Mystery of the Emblem is set on the continent of Archanea, and is split into two halves dubbed "Books". "Book 1" is a retelling of the events of Shadow Dragon and the Blade of Light: Marth, the prince of Altea, is forced into exile when his homeland is attacked by the neighboring kingdom of Gra. With his father killed and his sister Elice captive, Marth must muster a force to defeat the will driving the invasion: the dark dragon Medeus and his ally Gharnef. Marth's allies include the princess and Pegasus knight Caeda, Marth's mentor Jagen, Prince Hardin of Aurelis, kindly Princess Nyna of Archanea's Royal Family, and the Archsage Gotoh. His quest leads him to recovering Falchion, a magical sword which can defeat Medeus and which only Marth can wield due to his ancient heritage as a descendant of Anri, the warrior who defeated Medeus. Having recovered both Falchion and the magical Fire Emblem shield, Marth confronts Gharnef and Medeus, the latter of whom is leader of the last surviving tribe of Manakete, an ancient tribe which could shapeshift into dragons. In the end, Marth defeats Medeus and restores peace, surrendering the Fire Emblem to Archanea for safekeeping. Hardin marries Nyna and becomes the king of Archanea.

"Book 2" takes place two years after Book 1. Hardin begins the forceful military occupation of neighboring countries, with Marth's army being used as part of the conquests. When Marth grows suspicious of his role in Hardin's plans, he is branded as a traitor to Archanea and is relentlessly hunted down by Hardin's forces. Receiving the Fire Emblem from Nyna by way of a courier, Marth and his army escapes to the desert of Khadein and meets with Gotoh. He explains that Hardin has become possessed by the evil power of the Darksphere, which Gharnef secretly gave to him, and that only the Lightsphere can counter its power and save Hardin. Marth is also tasked with locating three other magical spheres in his quest: the Lifesphere, the Geosphere, and the Starsphere (the latter of which must be reassembled through the collection of Starshards). Marth and his allies journey through the icy mountains to obtain the Lightsphere, then stage a final assault on Archanea to liberate the continent from Hardin's madness. Though the Lightsphere nullifies the Darksphere's power, Hardin is critically wounded in his battle and can only apologize to Marth for his actions before he dies. If the player has not collected the five spheres, the game ends prematurely at this point; Marth is duped into believing Gharnef has been defeated, and soon has to fight another war against Medeus. If the player did collect the spheres, Marth inserts all five into the Fire Emblem and unlocks its full power as the Binding Shield.

Gotoh then arrives to inform Marth that Gharnef has kidnapped several female clerics, including Princess Nyna and his own sister Elice, to serve as sacrifices for the revival of Medeus. Marth leads his army to an ancient temple where Gharnef holds the ceremony. After killing Gharnef, retrieving Falchion, and rescuing the clerics, Marth confronts Medeus, who has taken the form of an enormous dark dragon. Using the Falchion and Binding Shield, Marth slays Medeus. With peace restored to the land, Marth and Caeda, now married, become the rulers of all Archanea.

== Development and release ==
Mystery of the Emblem was developed by Intelligent Systems, the original creators of the Fire Emblem series, under supervision from publisher and studio owner Nintendo. Development began in 1992 during the development of Fire Emblem Gaiden, with production lasting almost three years. Shouzou Kaga returned as designer and writer. Keisuke Terasaki acted as director, while Gunpei Yokoi returned as producer. The characters were designed by Katsuyoshi Koya, who would go on to work on Fire Emblem: Genealogy of the Holy War. The music was composed by Yuka Tsujiyoko, who worked on the soundtrack with sound designer Masaya Kuzume. She would later refer to the game as her favorite title out of the Fire Emblem games she had worked on.

Due to the increased hardware capabilities, the team were able to increase both the content and graphical quality. With the aim of encouraging new players to buy the game, the overall difficulty was reduced compared to previous entries. After the unconventional gameplay of Gaiden, Mystery of the Emblem returned to the traditional gameplay used for Shadow Dragon and the Blade of Light, in addition to continuing the story of Marth after focusing on different characters for Gaiden. Mystery of the Emblem was initially only going to include original story content, but after consideration, it was decided to include an upgraded version of Shadow Dragon and the Blade of Light for those who had not played the original. Another proposed plan was to split the release into two parts: a remake of Shadow Dragon and the Blade of Light and Mystery of the Emblem. Due to space limitations, some characters featured in the original version of Shadow Dragon and the Blade of Light needed to be cut. The romance between Marth and Caeda was introduced as a refined version of a similar plot featured in Gaiden. As with previous games set in Archanea, the series' titular Fire Emblem took the form of a shield inset with five magical gems. According to Kaga, Mystery of the Emblem was intended as the last major title to be set on the continent of Archanea. However, Archenea later provided the setting for Fire Emblem Awakening. Released overseas in 2013, Awakening is set over a thousand years after the events of Shadow Dragon and the Blade of Light.

Mystery of the Emblem was released for the Super Famicom on January 21, 1994. It was the first Fire Emblem title for the system, and the first to use a 24-megabit cartridge. It would later receive multiple releases on Nintendo's digital Virtual Console platform: the version for the Wii released on December 26, 2006; the version for the Wii U on April 27, 2014; and the version for the Nintendo 3DS on June 22, 2016. Like other early Fire Emblem titles, it did not receive a Western release, though a full fan translation was released in 2008.

== Reception ==
Reception

Review scores
Publication	Score
Famitsu	9/10, 8/10, 9/10, 10/10
Nintendo Life	8/10
RPGamer	3.5/5
RPGFan	80/100

While no exact figure is available, Mystery of the Emblem stood as the best first-week debut for the series until the Nintendo 3DS title Fire Emblem Awakening in 2012. As of 2002, Mystery of the Emblem had sold 776,338 units. This made Mystery of the Emblem the best-selling title in the Fire Emblem series to that date.

Famitsu was generally positive about Mystery of the Emblem, citing both its overall quality and the improvements made to the gameplay and presentation of content from Shadow Dragon and the Blade of Light. Mike Moehnke of RPGamer felt that the story was "fine without being great", especially as it was a partial remake of the first game. While he enjoyed the gameplay, he noted that it felt like a precursor to the more refined and expanded mechanics of later titles in the series, despite praising the dismounting mechanic. The graphics he found unimpressive for the platform, while he found the audio a mixed effect with a lack of tunes in the first half and more variety and strength for the second half. He finished that the game was worth seeking out for series and genre fans, but that the language barrier and advances of subsequent Fire Emblem titles made it less appealing.

Nintendo Life's Gonçalo Lopes praised the general narrative, technical improvements and overall gameplay. He generally called it one of the best entries for the system and the series as a whole. In a retrospective on the game for its 20th anniversary, Dengeki Online called it both one of the best entries in the series, the genre and the system. Destructoid later ranked Mystery of the Emblem among the five best titles in the Fire Emblem series.

== Legacy ==
=== Anime ===
- Fire Emblem: Mystery of the Emblem

ファイアーエムブレム 紋章の謎 (Faiā Emuburemu Monshō no Nazo)
- Genre: Adventure, Fantasy
- Original video animation
- Directed by: Shin Misawa
- Produced by: Ayumi Enomoto; Masao Mochizuki
- Written by: Yōsuke Kuroda
- Music by: Hiroyuki Kōzu
- Studio: Studio Fantasia
- Released: January 26, 1996 – April 26, 1996
- Runtime: 30 minutes
- Episodes: 2

Mystery of the Emblem was adapted into an original video animation (OVA): two episodes were produced by KSS and released in 1996, but no further episodes have been produced following poor sales, leaving the OVA series unfinished. Marth's Japanese voice actor, Hikaru Midorikawa, would go on to voice the character in subsequent appearances in spin-off and crossover media. These episodes were dubbed into English by A.D. Vision and released in North America on April 14, 1998, five years before Fire Emblem: The Blazing Blade was localized.

=== BS Fire Emblem ===
The title screen for BS Fire Emblem

BS Fire Emblem: Archanea Senki-hen (Note: Japanese: BS ファイアーエムブレム アカネイア戦記編, Hepburn: BS Faiā Emuburemu: Akaneia Senki-hen; lit. BS Fire Emblem: Archanea War Chronicles) commonly referred to as BS Fire Emblem, is an episodic tactical role-playing game developed by Intelligent Systems and released in 1997 following the release of Genealogy of the Holy War. It acts as a prequel to the events of the first Fire Emblem title and Mystery of the Emblem. The four episodes of BS Fire Emblem were broadcast between September and October 1997 on the Satellaview peripheral service, a system where short games were downloaded via satellite at given times of day. While it employs the same tactical gameplay as the mainline titles, it throws waves of enemies at the main party during a three-hour time limit.

BS Fire Emblem was directed and designed by Kaga, while the music was composed by Tsujiyoko in her role as composer and sound director. The character artwork was done by Rika Suzuki, a newcomer to the Fire Emblem series who would later go on to create character illustrations for Fire Emblem Awakening. It was the first title in the Fire Emblem series to include voice acting, created using livestreaming during the original broadcast. The game used the technology created for Mystery of the Emblem.

The first episode, "Episode 1: Fall of the Palace", (Note: Dai Isshi-wa: Paresu Kanraku (Japanese: 第1話・パレス陥落)) was broadcast on September 28; "Episode 2: Crimson Dragoon Knight" (Note: Dai Nishi-wa: Akai Ryū Kishi (Japanese: 第2話・赤い竜騎士)) released on October 5; "Episode 3: Thieves of Justice" (Note: Dai Sanshi-wa: Seigi no Tōzoku-dan (Japanese: 第3話・正義の盗賊団)) released on October 12; and the finale, "Episode 4: Time of Beginning", (Note: Dai Yonsh-wa: Hajimari no Toki (Japanese: 第4話・始まりのとき)) released on October 19. Since broadcast, the original game became very rare due to the method of release and the discontinuation of Satellaview service, requiring a cartridge with the game installed to be available. Even then, the original streamed voice acting is unavailable. While forming part of the Fire Emblem series and technically the fifth entry, BS Fire Emblem is frequently not counted among the main entries. Instead, it is seen as an extension of Mystery of the Emblem. Despite being included in the official timeline of its fictional setting and having characters from it being included within the main campaign of Fire Emblem: New Mystery of the Emblem, it is considered an "unofficial" part of the series.

=== Remake ===
Mystery of the Emblem was remade and released in 2010 for the Nintendo DS titled Fire Emblem: New Mystery of the Emblem, it was built upon the gameplay systems of the first game's DS remake Fire Emblem: Shadow Dragon, and incorporated a customizable avatar as the main character alongside Marth. The story content of BS Fire Emblem was eventually re-released as additional content for New Mystery of the Emblem, dubbed "New Archanea Chronicles". It was the first time a Satellaview title has been re-released in any form by Nintendo.
