= Shouzou Kaga =

Japanese video game designer (born 1955)

- 加賀昭三
- Born: 1955 (age 70–71); Japan
- Occupations: Video game designer, director, scenario writer
- Years active: 1990–2005, 2015–present

Shouzou Kaga (加賀昭三, Kaga Shōzō; born 1955) is a Japanese video game designer and scenario writer best known as the creator of the Fire Emblem series. During his career at Intelligent Systems, he would lead the development of Fire Emblem from its inception until the release of Fire Emblem: Thracia 776. In addition to being development lead, he was a major creative contributor to each game's setting, story, and presentation.

Following his departure from Intelligent Systems in 1999, he continued work in game design by founding the independent studio Tirnanog and going on to develop the Tear Ring Saga series, initially under the name Emblem Saga. In 2001, the company would be sued by Nintendo on the grounds of copyright infringement against the Fire Emblem series. This incident increased the negative impression of Kaga among Japanese Fire Emblem fans at the time, and caused friction between those who supported Kaga and those who did not. Following the release of Berwick Saga in 2005, Kaga took an apparent hiatus from video game production, lasting a decade until the production and release of Vestaria Saga in 2016. Regarding this hiatus, Kaga said that he retired as a game creator in 2005.

== Ludography ==
Year	Title	Role
1990	Fire Emblem: Shadow Dragon and the Blade of Light	Game design, scenario
1992	Fire Emblem Gaiden	Director, game design, scenario
1994	Fire Emblem: Mystery of the Emblem	Director, game design, scenario
1996	Fire Emblem: Genealogy of the Holy War	Director, game design, scenario
1997	BS Fire Emblem: Akaneia Senki	Director, game design, scenario
1998	Super Famicom Wars	Game design
1999	Fire Emblem: Thracia 776	Game design, scenario
2000	Trade & Battle: Card Hero	Advisor
2001	Tear Ring Saga	Game design, scenario
2005	Berwick Saga	Game design, scenario
2016	Vestaria Saga	Game design, scenario
2019	Vestaria Saga 外伝「シルヴァビルヒの聖なる剣」	Game design, scenario
2019	Vestaria Saga 外伝「ルッカの英雄」	Game design, scenario
2019	Vestaria Saga I (Remake)	Game design, scenario
2022	Vestaria Saga II	Game design, scenario
