= In Kampf =

Former Yiddish newspaper in Poland

- Type: Weekly newspaper
- Political alignment: Labour Zionism
- Language: Yiddish
- Headquarters: Warsaw
- Country: Poland

In Kampf (Yiddish: אין קאמף, "In Struggle") was a Yiddish-language weekly newspaper published from Warsaw, Poland. In Kampf was an organ of the Labour Zionist Poalei Zion Right.
