= Martine Kempf =

French computer scientist

Martine Kempf is a French computer scientist who is known for inventing the Katalavox in 1985, a computer-based voice activation system.

Martine Kempf was born to Jean-Pierre Kempf and Brigitte Maguerite Klockenbring Kempf in 1951 in Dossenheim-Kochersberg, France. Kempf's academic journey led her to Friedrich Wilhelm University, also known as the University of Bonn, where she pursued her studies in astronomy during the period of 1981 to 1983. Throughout her time at the university, she developed a profound interest in electronic design, hardware, and software. During her years as a student, Kempf was deeply moved by the challenges faced by German teenagers who were born without arms due to their mother's use of thalidomide during their pregnancies. Kempf reasoned that a voice activation system would allow those affected with physical difficulties to drive cars. This voice activation device also helps with microsurgery, as surgeons can use voice commands to focus magnifying devices and has the potential to be used as a mobile phone to control a car by spoken commands.

== Career and Innovations ==
Martine Kempf's father, Jean-Pierre Kempf, was a paraplegic, who lost the use of his legs due to polio at the age of two. Passionate about mechanics, Jean-Pierre assembled his own car to adapt it to be able to drive it himself. His design became popularized by a car magazine and was in high demand from paraplegics and amputees who also wanted to drive. Jean-Pierre established his own company to manufacture cars for them and the company became the leading driving aids manufacturer in France, also being popularized in other European countries. His inventions, the digital accelerator ring and main hand brake became the current standard hand controls in France. Designing several innovative driving solutions, Kempf continually advanced his driving solutions for people with disabilities and had the capacity to adapt to almost every vehicle in his lifetime until his death on April 10, 2002.

Desiring to create her own company in France, Martine Kempf was not granted her loan from the socialist French government in 1985, leading to her leaving for Silicon Valley to establish her company that adapted surgical microscopes. Becoming her father's supplier in the mid-1990s, she restarted his company in France and led KEMPF SAS. Establishing KEMPF Inc. and managing KEMPF SAS, Martine Kempf took over her father's legacy in gifting the ability to drive to people with disabilities. Martine Kempf is currently the CEO of KEMPF Inc., president of KEMPF SAS, and the founder of Kempf Beijing Technology Co Ltd. KEMPF Inc. adapts vehicles for drivers with a disability, like trucks, vans, minivans, SUVs, cars, and sports cars. KEMPF SAS and Kempf Beijing Technology Co Ltd. are KEMPF Inc.'s counterparts in Europe and China, respectively.

After teaching herself electronics with books and magazines in university, Martine Kempf designed a cutting-edge speech recognition system. Martine Kempf's innovation, the breakthrough voice recognition microcomputer named Katalavox, allowed surgeons to guide and operate surgical microscopes with ease using basic spoken instructions. Handicapped people may even communicate with their electric wheelchairs to control them. Kempf's Katalavox, shaped like a small box, weighs approximately five pounds and responds to commands, like "right," "left," "zoom in," or "zoom out, in 0.008 of a second. The Katalavox stores the user's voice in its memory even when turned off. Currently, in use by Moscow's Institute of Eye Microsurgery, Paris' Rothschild Clinic, Stanford University Hospital, and the Mayo Clinic, the Katalavox was created by Kempf transforming the human voice's analog signaling into the computer's digital signals. This invention is also recognized by NASA, which is testing the Katalavox in space shuttles to control cameras.
