= Fire Emblem =

Tactical role-playing video game franchise published by Nintendo

- Logo since 2013
- Genre: Tactical role-playing
- Developers: Intelligent Systems; Koei Tecmo (2019); Atlus; Omega Force; Team Ninja
- Publisher: Nintendo
- Creator: Shouzou Kaga
- Composer: Yuka Tsujiyoko
- Platforms: Family Computer; Super Famicom; Game Boy Advance; GameCube; Wii; Nintendo DS; Nintendo 3DS; Wii U; Android; iOS; Nintendo Switch; Nintendo Switch 2
- First release: Fire Emblem: Shadow Dragon and the Blade of Light; April 20, 1990
- Latest release: Fire Emblem: Fortune's Weave; September 17, 2026
- Spin-offs: Fire Emblem Heroes; Fire Emblem Warriors; Tokyo Mirage Sessions ♯FE

Fire Emblem (Note: Japanese: ファイアーエムブレム, Hepburn: Faiā Emuburemu) is a Japanese fantasy tactical role-playing video game franchise developed by Intelligent Systems and published by Nintendo. First produced and published for the Nintendo Entertainment System in 1990, the series currently consists of eighteen core entries and five spinoffs.

The core gameplay revolves around discrete battles between the player's team of characters and enemy non-player characters across grid-based maps. The player and enemy each take turns moving their characters across the map and having them perform combat-based actions. The games also feature a story and characters similar to traditional role-playing video games, and occasionally social simulation aspects as well. A notable aspect of gameplay is the permanent death of characters in battle, rendering them unusable upon being defeated, although this aspect of the game can be turned off starting from Fire Emblem: New Mystery of the Emblem onwards.

The series' title refers to the "Fire Emblem", a recurring element usually portrayed as a royal weapon or shield representing the power of war and dragons. The development of the first game began as a dōjin project by Shouzou Kaga and three other developers, and its success prompted the development of further games in the series. Kaga headed the development of each entry until the release of Thracia 776, when he left Intelligent Systems. He went on to found his own game studio, Tirnanog, who developed Tear Ring Saga.

The series debuted in the West with the seventh game The Blazing Blade in 2003, under the title Fire Emblem. According to the game's director, this was because of the international success of the similarly turn-based Advance Wars. The inclusion of Marth and Roy in the 2001 fighting game Super Smash Bros. Melee as playable characters is also cited as a reason for the series' international release. Many games in the series sold well, although sales suffered a decline during the late 2000s. This downturn resulted in the series' near-cancellation until the critical and commercial successes of Fire Emblem Awakening (2012) and Fire Emblem: Three Houses (2019).

The series has been lauded for its gameplay and is frequently cited as the seminal series in the tactical role-playing genre, codifying various gameplay elements that would come to define the genre. Characters from across the series have been included in crossovers with other video game franchises, including the Super Smash Bros. series.

== Common elements ==
=== Gameplay ===
Fire Emblem's developers have described it as an "RPG simulation" that combines tactical simulation gameplay with the plot and character development of a role-playing game, creating a sense of connection with characters not present in previous tactical games. Battles in the Fire Emblem series take place on a grid-based map, with the player controlling a set number of characters across maps tied to the game's story and optional side stories. Each character has a specific character class which gives them set abilities and affects how far they can move across the field; some classes have innate skills unique to them. Depending on the installment, a character's class can be changed or upgraded, sometimes by using special items. During a battle, a character gains experience points by performing actions, such as attacking an enemy, healing an ally, or slaying a foe, which typically offers the most experience points. Each character has their own stats, and once a certain level is reached they level up and new skill points are awarded randomly to their attributes, such as health, agility, or strength. A character gains more experience the more they are used in battle.

A key element present in combat since Genealogy of the Holy War is the Weapon Triangle, a system governing the strengths and weaknesses that certain weapons and types of magic have against each other in a rock–paper–scissors fashion. For weapons, lances have an advantage against swords, swords have an advantage against axes, and axes have an advantage against lances. In the magic system, fire is stronger than wind, wind is stronger than thunder, and thunder is stronger than fire. From The Binding Blade through Radiant Dawn, these three elements are collectively known as anima magic. Anima is stronger than light, light is stronger than darkness, and darkness is stronger than anima. In Fates, the Weapon Triangle relationships add other weapons: swords and tomes are stronger than axes and bows, axes and bows are stronger than lances and shurikens, and lances and shurikens are stronger than swords and tomes. Most games use a Weapon Durability system: after being used a certain number of times, a character's weapon will break. Different installments have various systems related to weapons: in Genealogy of the Holy War, weapons can be repaired at special shops; in Path of Radiance and future games, weapons can be bought and upgraded. Fates replaces the durability system with a system where more powerful weapons weaken some of their wielder's stats.

Character relationships can be developed through support affinity both inside and outside of battle, which increases certain battle abilities. A feature introduced in Genealogy of the Holy War and used in later installments is that characters who fall in love can have a child who inherits certain skills and stats from them. One of the recurring features in the series is permanent death, in which units defeated in battle are permanently removed from the party, with very few exceptions, one being the main character, whose death results in a game over instead. Fire Emblem: New Mystery of the Emblem introduced Casual Mode, in which dead characters are revived at the end of a battle. Fates added Phoenix Mode, in which defeated characters are revived on the player's next turn. Another inclusion from Fates is 'My Castle', a customizable castle serving as the player's base of operations throughout the game.

=== Story and themes ===
The Fire Emblem games take place across unrelated settings within a medieval or Renaissance-themed time period. The main protagonist, who is usually either royalty or a mercenary, is caught in the conflict of two or more countries across a continent and fighting for their cause. The continents of Archanea and Valentia are the settings of Shadow Dragon and the Blade of Light, Gaiden, Mystery of the Emblem, and Awakening, and were the planned setting for Fire Emblem 64. Genealogy of the Holy War and Thracia 776 are set in Jugdral, which is distantly connected with Archanea and Valentia, while The Blazing Blade and The Binding Blade take place in Elibe. The Sacred Stones is set in Magvel, and Path of Radiance and Radiant Dawn are set on the continent Tellius. Fates is set on an unnamed continent, with the story instead focusing on the two powers fighting over its territory. Three Houses takes place on the continent of Fódlan. Engage is set in the continent of Elyos.

A recurring element in the series is the titular artifact known as the "Fire Emblem". In Shadow Dragon and the Blade of Light and other games set in Archanea, it is a shield inset with five magical gems named after its connection to dragons and weapons of war, being the "emblem of flame". It also appears as a family crest in Genealogy of the Holy War, a family seal in The Binding Blade, a magic gemstone in The Sacred Stones, a bronze medallion holding a goddess of chaos in Path of Radiance and Radiant Dawn, a sword in Fates, and hereditary magical sigils in Three Houses. Other magical elements, including feuding gods and mystical species such as dragons and shapeshifters, are also recurring elements in the series.

== Development and history ==
The first Fire Emblem game, Shadow Dragon and the Blade of Light, was originally never intended as a commercial game, defined by creator Shouzou Kaga as a dōjin project with three other job-holding students. However, the game's unexpected commercial success prompted the development of more games in the series. The game was developed at Intelligent Systems, whose previous notable game was the strategy game Famicom Wars. Kaga worked on the Fire Emblem series until Thracia 776, when he left Intelligent Systems and began development on Tear Ring Saga for the PlayStation. After Thracia 776, the Fire Emblem series had several releases on portable devices. In 2001, Marth and Roy, from Shadow Dragon and the Blade of Light and The Binding Blade respectively, appeared as playable characters in Super Smash Bros. Melee. This, alongside the international success of Advance Wars, is cited as what led to Nintendo localizing The Blazing Blade for Western regions under the title Fire Emblem. Due to its success overseas, it was decided to return the series to home consoles for Path of Radiance for the GameCube. Despite it arriving late in the GameCube's life cycle, it provided a late boost to sales, reaffirming Nintendo's faith in the series. By 2010, the series was suffering from declining sales and Nintendo told Intelligent Systems that if their next Fire Emblem failed to sell above 250,000 units, the series would be canceled. This prompted Intelligent Systems to include many features new to the series in Awakening, with the intention of making it the culmination of the entire series up to that point. The game's reception and sales ended up saving the series from cancellation, convincing Nintendo to continue production.

The series' original music was composed by Yuka Tsujiyoko. As the only music composer at Intelligent Systems when Shadow Dragon and the Blade of Light was in production, she acted as both composer and sound director, up until Thracia 776, when she left the company to become a freelancer after completing the score for Paper Mario. She has worked on later Fire Emblem games, alongside other composers including Saki Kasuga, Hiroki Morishita, and Rei Kondoh. The series includes several other notable staff members: Tohru Narihiro, who was involved in every Fire Emblem since the original; Masahiro Higuchi, who began as a graphics designer for Genealogy of the Holy War; and Kouhei Maeda, who wrote the scenarios for every game since The Blazing Blade and became a director for Awakening.

Multiple artists are associated with the series. The characters of Mystery of the Emblem and Genealogy of the Holy War were designed by Katsuyoshi Koya, who later worked on designs for the Fire Emblem Trading Card Game. Katsuyoshi, who was unsatisfied with his work on the series, stepped down for Thracia 776. The designer for Thracia 776 was Mayumi Hirota, whose brief tenure with the series ended when she left Intelligent Systems with Kaga after the game's completion. Nevertheless, her art for the series was described by Kaga as his favorite up to that point. Other artists involved in later games are Eiji Kaneda (The Binding Blade), Sachiko Wada (The Sacred Stones) and Senri Kita (Path of Radiance, Radiant Dawn). For Shadow Dragon, the character artwork was remade by Ghost in the Shell artist Masamune Shirow. The in-game portraits were instead designed by longtime contributor Daisuke Izuka, who returned as character designer for the remake of Mystery of the Emblem. For Awakening, art director Toshiyuki Kusakihara worked with character designer Yūsuke Kozaki, who was brought in to give a new look to the series. Kozaki later returned as character designer for Fates and Heroes. For Echoes: Shadows of Valentia, illustrator Hidari was hired to revise classic Gaiden designs in addition to creating new ones. To depict a "glamorous, aristocratic society" in Three Houses, Intelligent Systems contracted character designer Chinatsu Kurahana, best known for her work on otome games such as Uta no Prince-sama, while freelance artist Kazuma Koda provided the concept art. Kurahana returned to design protagonist Shez, Arval, and the house leaders in its spin-off, Warriors: Three Hopes, with Kusakihara filling in for the rest of the cast.

== Games ==
Release timeline
1990	Shadow Dragon and the Blade of Light
1991
1992	Gaiden
1993
1994	Mystery of the Emblem
1995
1996	Genealogy of the Holy War
1997	Archanean War Chronicles
1998
1999	Thracia 776
2000–2001
2002	The Binding Blade
2003	The Blazing Blade
2004	The Sacred Stones
2005	Path of Radiance
2006
2007	Radiant Dawn
2008	Shadow Dragon
2009
2010	New Mystery of the Emblem
2011
2012	Awakening
2013–2014
2015	Fates
2015	Tokyo Mirage Sessions ♯FE
2016
2017	Heroes
2017	Echoes: Shadows of Valentia
2017	Warriors
2018
2019	Three Houses
2020	Tokyo Mirage Sessions ♯FE Encore
2021
2022	Warriors: Three Hopes
2023	Engage
2024
2025	Shadows
2026	Fortune's Weave

There are currently eighteen games in the core Fire Emblem series, of which fifteen have been original games and three have been remakes.

=== Main series ===
The first entry in the series, Shadow Dragon and the Blade of Light, was released in 1990 for the Japanese Famicom. A second game for the Famicom, Fire Emblem Gaiden, was released in 1992. It is known for having unusual mechanics compared to the rest of the series, such as dungeon exploration. It takes place in a similar timeframe as Shadow Dragon and the Blade of Light, but on a different continent. In 1994, Mystery of the Emblem was released for the Super Famicom, containing both a remake of Shadow Dragon and the Blade of Light and a sequel of the first game. Two more games were released for the Super Famicom in 1996 and 1999 respectively: Genealogy of the Holy War and Thracia 776.

The next entry released was The Binding Blade in 2002 for the Game Boy Advance. A prequel to The Binding Blade, The Blazing Blade, was released for the Game Boy Advance the following year. It was released overseas under the title Fire Emblem in 2003 in North America and 2004 in Europe, becoming the first official release of the Fire Emblem series in these regions. This is due in part to the inclusion of Marth and Roy in Super Smash Bros. Melee for the GameCube in 2001, and the earlier release (and success) of Advance Wars in the West, prompting Intelligent Systems and Nintendo to finally release Fire Emblem in the West. The final entry for the Game Boy Advance, The Sacred Stones, was released in 2004 in Japan, and in 2005 in North America and Europe.

The ninth installment in the series, Path of Radiance, was released worldwide on the GameCube in 2005. It was the first Fire Emblem game to feature 3D graphics, voice acting, and full-motion animated cutscenes. A direct sequel to Path of Radiance, Radiant Dawn was released for the Wii in 2007 in Japan and North America, and 2008 in Europe.

In 2008, the series returned to handheld systems with two releases for the Nintendo DS. Fire Emblem: Shadow Dragon, an expanded remake of the first game, was released in 2008 in Japan and Europe, and 2009 in North America. Shadow Dragon makes use of unique DS features unavailable to the Famicom and introduced new characters, added additional story elements, revamped mechanics, and modernized graphics. A Japanese-only entry, New Mystery of the Emblem, was released in 2010 for the DS as an expanded remake of Mystery of the Emblem.

The series moved to the Nintendo 3DS with Fire Emblem Awakening, the thirteenth game in the series, released in 2012 in Japan and 2013 in North America and Europe. Awakening was a major critical and commercial success, and is credited for revitalizing the franchise. The second entry for the Nintendo 3DS, Fates, was released in June 2015 in Japan, February 2016 in North America, and in May 2016 for Europe and Australia. Fates comes in three versions: two physical versions titled Birthright and Conquest, and a third route titled Revelation released as downloadable content. Fates was later re-released as a special version with all three versions included. A third entry, Fire Emblem Echoes: Shadows of Valentia, was released on the Nintendo 3DS in April 2017 in Japan and in North America and Europe the following month. Echoes is an enhanced remake of Gaiden, maintaining many of the unique features of Gaiden while revamping the graphics and script, and adding several ease-of-play improvements.

A Fire Emblem game was announced for the Nintendo Switch during a Fire Emblem focused Nintendo Direct in January 2017. The game was officially revealed as Fire Emblem: Three Houses during the Nintendo Direct presentation at E3 2018, and was released in July 2019. Fire Emblem Engage, a second entry for Nintendo Switch, was announced during a September 2022 Nintendo Direct and released in January 2023. Fire Emblem: Fortune's Weave, an entry for the Nintendo Switch 2, was announced in September 2025 and was released on September 17, 2026.

=== Spin-offs and cameos ===
In 1997, an episodic prequel to Mystery of the Emblem titled BS Fire Emblem: Archanea Senki-hen was released through Satellaview. The events of Archanea Senki were included in the remake of Mystery of the Emblem. BS Fire Emblem is considered an official part of the series by some developers, but not generally by fans. A crossover with the Shin Megami Tensei series, Tokyo Mirage Sessions ♯FE, was released in December 2015 in Japan and worldwide in June 2016 for the Wii U. Tokyo Mirage Sessions ♯FE was developed by Atlus rather than Intelligent Systems and combines gameplay, narrative, and aesthetic elements from both the Fire Emblem and Shin Megami Tensei series. On January 17, 2020, an enhanced version titled Tokyo Mirage Sessions ♯FE Encore was released on Nintendo Switch. Fire Emblem Heroes is a spin-off gacha game for Android and iOS, and was released in February 2017 for mobile devices. Heroes is a crossover of characters from across the Fire Emblem series, rather than with another series, and also introduced original characters not seen in any other Fire Emblem game. A crossover with the Dynasty Warriors series, Fire Emblem Warriors, was released for the New Nintendo 3DS and Nintendo Switch in 2017. It was developed by Omega Force and Team Ninja. A second Warriors game, based on Three Houses, and titled Fire Emblem Warriors: Three Hopes was announced in a Nintendo Direct on February 9, 2022, and released on June 24, 2022. Fire Emblem Shadows, the second mobile game in the series was announced and released on September 25, 2025, as a social deduction strategy game.

Characters from the Fire Emblem series have appeared in a number of other games as cameos or as part of crossovers. This includes multiple entries in the Super Smash Bros. series, beginning with protagonists Marth and Roy in Super Smash Bros. Melee. Characters from the series also appeared in Intelligent Systems' strategy game Code Name: S.T.E.A.M. as optional characters unlocked via amiibo.

=== Cancelled games ===
A Fire Emblem game was initially in development for the Nintendo 64 and its peripheral 64DD. Originally codenamed Fire Emblem 64, it was first revealed by Shigeru Miyamoto in 1997. Ultimately, due to poor sales for the 64DD and internal structural changes at Intelligent Systems, Fire Emblem 64 was cancelled in 2000 and development shifted to what would become Fire Emblem: The Binding Blade, with work done for Fire Emblem 64 being incorporated into the title.

An additional RTS-based game for the Wii was planned and would have been released after Fire Emblem: Radiant Dawn, but after trial and error and an unfocused development schedule, the project was cancelled. Intelligent Systems never planned a Fire Emblem game for the Wii U. Nintendo producer Hitoshi Yamagami said such a game would need to sell 700,000 copies to be profitable. A rumored Fire Emblem remake for the Nintendo 3DS had been in development following the success of Echoes. According to the reports, it was one of many video games that had been in development for the platform late in its life but were ultimately scrapped, with many speculating those projects could be moved to the Nintendo Switch.

== Reception ==
Sales and aggregate review scores As of December 31, 2021.
Game	Year	Units sold (in millions)	GameRankings	Metacritic
Shadow Dragon and the Blade of Light	1990	0.33	-	-
Gaiden	1992	0.32	-	-
Mystery of the Emblem	1994	0.78	-	-
Genealogy of the Holy War	1996	0.50	-	-
Thracia 776	1999	0.11	99%	-
The Binding Blade	2002	0.35	-	-
The Blazing Blade	2003	-	89%	88
The Sacred Stones	2004	-	85%	85
Path of Radiance	2005	-	86%	85
Radiant Dawn	2007	-	79%	78
Shadow Dragon	2008	-	81%	81
New Mystery of the Emblem	2010	-	-	-
Awakening	2012	2.37	93%	92
Fates	2015	3.09	89%	88 (Note: Birthright: 86, Conquest: 87, Revelation: 88)
Echoes: Shadows of Valentia	2017	1.00	83%	81
Three Houses	2019	4.12	89%	89
Engage	2023	1.61	-	80

Sales in Japan were the highest with Shadow Dragon and the Blade of Light but progressively declined with future games, which sold 329,087; 324,699; 776,338; 498,216 and 106,108 copies respectively. As of 2002, total sales had reached over two million copies. Awakening topped the total sales of both Radiant Dawn and the Mystery of the Emblem remake in its first week. It went on to sell 2.35 million copies worldwide and become the best-selling Fire Emblem game in Western territories at the time.

In 2007, a Japanese public poll named Mystery of the Emblem as one of the country's All Time Top 100 video games. Speaking to USGamer, Massive Chalice creator Brad Muir commented on how Fire Emblem had influenced the game, referring to it as "[a] venerable strategy series", making positive reference to its gameplay and character relationships. In her review of Awakening, IGN's Audrey Drake said that "Far too few people have played the Fire Emblem series", calling it "[a] darling of the hardcore strategy RPG crowd - and one of the shining gems of the genre".

Several journalistic sites have cited its low notoriety in the west as an effect of Nintendo's sporadic localization efforts, along with its place in a niche game genre. At the same time, they have praised the series' gameplay, regularly noting its high difficulty and relationship mechanics. The series has been cited as an inspiration for later tactical role-playing games, with Gamasutra naming Tactics Ogre: Let Us Cling Together, Final Fantasy Tactics and the Disgaea series as being influenced by its design. In 2014, Destructoid writer Chris Carter praised the series' mechanics, and at the same time chose Mystery of the Emblem, Path of Radiance, and Awakening in his list of the five best games in the series. Awakening is generally cited as having brought the series more publicity and player attention outside of Japan.

== Legacy ==
=== Tear Ring Saga lawsuit ===
After Kaga left Intelligent Systems, he founded a studio called Tirnanog and began development on a game titled Emblem Saga, a strategy role-playing game for the PlayStation. The game bore multiple similarities to the Fire Emblem series, and Nintendo filed a lawsuit against Tirnanog for copyright infringement. The first suit failed, and the court ruled in Tirnanog's favor. Nintendo filed a second lawsuit, and this time was awarded a cash settlement of ¥76 million. Nevertheless, Tirnanog and publisher Enterbrain were still allowed to publish the entry, though they changed its name to "Tear Ring Saga", and eventually developed a sequel. Nintendo attempted taking a third lawsuit to the Japanese Supreme Court in 2005, but the second ruling was upheld.

=== In other media ===
A short, two episode original video animation series based on Mystery of the Emblem released in 1996. These anime episodes were released in North America in 1998, five years before The Blazing Blade was localized, making them the first official Fire Emblem media to be released in the region. Nintendo produced Amiibo figures of several Fire Emblem characters; they are compatible with Fates, Echoes: Shadows of Valentia, Three Houses, Code Name: S.T.E.A.M., Super Smash Bros. for Nintendo 3DS and Wii U, and Super Smash Bros. Ultimate. Manga based on the games have also been produced, including The Binding Blade, Awakening, and Engage. Two trading card games have been made with the Fire Emblem franchise: Fire Emblem: Trading Card Game, which was released from 2001–2006, and Fire Emblem 0 (Cipher), which was released in 2015 and was discontinued in late 2020 with the twenty second expansion pack being the last one.

== See also ==
- Wars series, a modern military strategy series also developed by Intelligent Systems
