= Fire Emblem: Shadow Dragon and the Blade of Light =

1990 video game

- Japanese box art
- Developers: Intelligent Systems; Nintendo R&D1
- Publisher: Nintendo
- Director: Keisuke Terasaki
- Producer: Gunpei Yokoi
- Designer: Shouzou Kaga
- Programmer: Toru Narihiro
- Artists: Toru Osawa; Naotaka Ohnishi; Satoshi Machida; Toshitaka Muramatsu
- Writer: Shouzou Kaga
- Composer: Yuka Tsujiyoko
- Series: Fire Emblem
- Platforms: Family Computer; Nintendo Switch
- Release: Family Computer: JP: April 20, 1990; Nintendo Switch: WW: December 4, 2020
- Genre: Tactical role-playing
- Mode: Single-player

Fire Emblem: Shadow Dragon and the Blade of Light, (Note: Japanese: ファイアーエムブレム 暗黒竜と光の剣, Hepburn: Faiā Emuburemu: Ankoku Ryū to Hikari no Tsurugi; or alternatively Ankoku Ryū to Hikari no Ken, lit. 'Fire Emblem: Dark Dragon and the Sword of Light') originally promoted simply as Fire Emblem, is a 1990 tactical role-playing video game developed by Intelligent Systems and Nintendo and published by Nintendo for the Family Computer. It is the first installment in the Fire Emblem series and was originally released in Japan. Set on the fictional continent of Archanea, the story follows the tale of Marth, prince of the kingdom of Altea, who is sent on a quest to reclaim his throne after being forced into exile by the evil sorcerer Gharnef and his dark master Medeus, the titular Shadow Dragon. Forming new alliances with neighboring kingdoms, Marth must gather a new army to help him retrieve the sacred sword Falchion and the Fire Emblem shield in order to defeat Gharnef and Medeus and save his kingdom. The gameplay revolves around turn-based battles on grid-based maps, with defeated units being subject to permanent death.

Beginning development in 1987, it was conceived by designer and writer Shouzou Kaga: influenced by Kure Software Koubou's First Queen (1988), Kaga wanted to combine the strategic elements of Intelligent Systems's previous simulation project, Famicom Wars, with the story, characters, and world of a traditional role-playing video game. Keisuke Terasaki acted as director and Gunpei Yokoi produced, while the music was composed by Yuka Tsujiyoko. The scale of the game meant that the team needed to find ways around memory storage problems, and make compromises with the graphics and storyline. While initial sales and critical reception were lackluster, it later became popular, launching the Fire Emblem series. The game would later be credited with codifying and popularizing the tactical role-playing genre as a whole.

The game was officially localized and released outside of Japan for the first time on the Nintendo Switch on December 4, 2020 in commemoration of the franchise's 30th anniversary. This updated version features new quality-of-life improvements such as fast-forwarding and rewinding through player and enemy turns, and the ability to create save states in the middle of gameplay. It was available digitally for a limited time until the end of March 2021.

== Gameplay ==
A battle in Fire Emblem: Shadow Dragon and the Blade of Light: shown is the army of Marth during the player's turn.

Fire Emblem: Shadow Dragon and the Blade of Light is a tactical role-playing game where players take on the role of Marth and his growing army during their campaign across the continent of Archanea. The game progresses in a linear fashion, with maps being unlocked and played as dictated by the storyline. Each playable character is assigned to unique character classes that have various functions in battle, such as being mounted or having access to magic. A unit's class affects their range of movement and strength on the battlefield: mounted or flying units have greater mobility, archers have a greater attack range, while heavily armored characters have more defense. Each character has a set character class, and each time a unit raises its experience level its various stats increase randomly. There are a total of 52 characters that can be recruited over the course of the game.

Battles use a turn-based battle system, with a limited number of player units and enemy units each taking turns and moving across a grid-based battlefield: battles are won by the player defeating key enemy units such as commanders and other boss characters. In battle, the game transitions to a dedicated battle arena, where the battle plays out in real-time. Each action yields experience points (EXP), and when the character earns 100 EXP, they level up, their health increases, and their class-specified statistics are randomly raised. During missions, towns and secret vendors can be visited, where new items such as healing potions and weapons can be purchased. Weapons are specific to different characters, and each weapon has a limited lifespan before breaking when it reaches its limit. Currency is limited to certain scripted or player-driven events, or wagering on arena battles. If a character falls in battle, they are subjected to permanent death, removing them from subsequent missions and the rest of the storyline. The game ends if Marth falls in battle.

== Synopsis ==
Long ago, the continent of Archanea was invaded by the Dolhr Empire, led by the Shadow Dragon Medeus. Anri, a youth from Altea, defeated the Shadow Dragon using the divine sword Falchion. The Kingdom of Archanea was restored and the world entered an era of peace. However, 100 years later, Medeus has revived and joined forces with the evil wizard Gharnef, who has conquered the mage-state of Khadein. The two form an alliance with the kingdoms of Macedon and Grust in order to conquer the world. Cornelius, the king of Altea and successor of Anri, takes up Falchion and leaves to battle them, leaving his son Prince Marth and daughter Princess Elice in the care of his castle manned by Altea's ally, Gra. However, Gra betrays Altea to Dolhr; Cornelius is killed, Falchion is stolen, and Elice sacrifices herself so Marth can escape. Accompanied by a handful of knights, he takes refuge in the island nation of Talys.

Several years later, Marth repels a pirate invasion of Talys, leading its king to conclude that he is ready to battle Dolhr; he sends Marth out with several of his most trusted men and his daughter, Princess Caeda. Marth first rescues the kingdom of Aurelis and enlists the aid of its king's younger brother, Duke Hardin and his retainers. He meets Princess Nyna, the last survivor of the Archanean royal family and leader of the resistance against Dolhr. She gives him the Fire Emblem, a legendary treasure given to the hero destined to save the world. The two march to Archanea and free it from Grust's grasp. After briefly invading Khadein in search of Falchion, Marth retakes Altea. He learns that his mother was killed in the invasion and that Gharnef is holding Elice prisoner. Marth next battles Grust and their top general, Camus, who rescued Nyna from execution at Dohlrian hands; he chooses to uphold his honor as a knight of Grust, and Marth is forced to defeat him.

Marth is contacted by Gotoh, a wise old sage, who informs him that Gharnef wields the tome Imhullu, making him invincible; the only thing capable of defeating him is the magic of Starlight. Gotoh sends Marth to the Fane of Raman to find the materials needed to create Starlight; he also rescues the divine dragon, Tiki. Marth then invades Macedon and deposes the tyrannical King Michalis with the aid of Michalis' sister Princess Minerva. There, Gotoh reforges Starlight. Marth invades Khadein once more, defeats Gharnef, reclaims Falchion, and rescues Elice. He then makes his way to Dolhr, battles, and defeats Medeus, returning peace to the land. If Caeda has survived the events of the game, she and Marth declare their love for one another.

== Development ==
Shadow Dragon and the Blade of Light was co-developed by Intelligent Systems and Nintendo Research & Development 1. It began after Intelligent Systems turned its attention away from developing hardware for the Famicom towards creating what they called "simulation games". It was directed by Keisuke Terasaki and produced by Gunpei Yokoi. The initial concept was created by Shouzou Kaga, who acted as scenario writer and designer. The graphics and character art was cooperatively handled by Tohru Ohsawa, Naotaka Ohnishi, Satoshi Machida and Toshitaka Muramatsu. The music was composed by Yuka Tsujiyoko, with technical guidance from Hirokazu Tanaka. Tsujiyoko, who would become a recurring composer for the series, became involved as she was the only composer then employed by Intelligent Systems. The initial development team was not very large, and several staff members undertook multiple tasks.

Conceptual development for Shadow Dragon and the Blade of Light began in 1987, three years prior to its release. The concept was first decided upon after the completion of Famicom Wars, as the team wanted to move away from the war-based setting of Famicom Wars and create a role-playing experience. The project was first proposed to Nintendo by Kaga with a design document. The document included all the basic elements, including the story, main character and gameplay mechanics. At this stage, the project was called "Battle Fantasy Fire Emblem". Kaga cited Kure Software Koubou's First Queen (1988) as an influence for the game. The staff never considered the game as a commercial product, being defined by Kaga as a dōjin project that was made on a whim. To make the game accessible to a wide audience, Kaga did his best to avoid emphasizing stats and other numerical data. The game's genre necessitated the extensive use of the Famicom cartridge's memory. Shadow Dragon and the Blade of Light exceeded these limits, so Intelligent Systems used a portion of memory dedicated to saving games to get around this limitation. With Nintendo's help, they created a new chip for the cartridge that could process and display Japanese text.

Kaga wanted to create a scenario where players would care about the characters in a similar way to a role-playing video game. According to Kaga, while role-playing games had strong stories but limited protagonists, tactical games had multiple characters but a weak story: Fire Emblem was his solution, combining the two to create a fun gameplay experience with relatable characters. This lack of emphasis on a single character was intentional, to the point that even Marth was not considered by Kaga to be the main character. The setting and characters drew inspiration from Classical mythology. During the early story draft, there were two dragons that acted as bosses: the Earth Dragon Gaia and the Water Dragon Neptune. While Neptune was scrapped due to hardware limitations, Gaia would evolve into the character of Medeus. The series' titular "Fire Emblem" appears in its first and most recognizable form as a shield with mystical power. The artifact's title made reference to war and the power of dragons, which would form a key part of future entries. The use of such an extensive story approach was a rarity in Famicom games at the time, which were still beset by memory storage problems. Multiple scenarios were also planned by Kaga to alleviate the linear feel of the campaign, but this could not be managed.

The initial plan was to create setpiece graphics for key story moments, similar to simulation titles on PC games. Among the scenes initially planned were Marth kneeling next to the character Jagen in a pool of blood, and two characters escaping from an ambush. To try and accommodate the advanced graphics, the team opted to use an MMC3 memory chip. The adoption of the MMC3 was influenced by memory space difficulties experienced by the team during the development of Famicom Wars. When it was discovered that the chip only had one megabyte of memory, the team were forced to streamline the graphics and visuals, resulting in the setpiece graphics being cut. The reduced emphasis on graphics meant that the game was not visually impressive, which was later regretted by Kaga and other team members.

== Release ==
During its early advertising, the game was dubbed Honō no Monshō (炎の紋章, lit. Emblem of Fire), and used character and narrative concepts that did not appear in the final product. The graphics also underwent changes, being particularly noticeable with Marth's hair color and style. The game was advertised on television with a live-action commercial featuring a version of the Fire Emblem theme. Filming the commercial proved troublesome: the actors overheated due to their heavy costumes, and the light and sound effects made the actor horse skittish. The commercial required twenty retakes. The game released on April 20, 1990.

In Japan, an emulated version of the game was released via Virtual Console. It was released for Wii on October 20, 2009; for Nintendo 3DS on August 1, 2012; and for Wii U on June 4, 2014. The game was added to the Nintendo Classics service in Japan on March 13, 2019.

To commemorate the franchise's 30th anniversary in 2020, the game was officially localized for the first time and released as a standalone title for the Nintendo Switch in the Americas, Europe, Oceania, and South Korea. This version of the game featured various built-in emulation features, such as save states, fast-forwarding, and rewind features. A special edition Fire Emblem 30th Anniversary Edition bundle was available exclusively in North America, which includes a download code for the game as well as various physical items, including a replica NES Game Pak with its own packaging and instruction manual. This release was a limited time offer, being available from December 4, 2020 up until the end of March 2021.

== Reception ==
According to Kaga, upon release Shadow Dragon and the Blade of Light received extensive criticism from Japanese publications. Many of them noted that it was difficult to understand and had fairly poor graphics, awarding it low scores. In contrast, popular opinion was more positive: in a poll taken by Family Computer Magazine, the game scored 23.48 points out of 30. Likewise, sales of the game were flat for the first two months of sales, but improved after word of mouth had spread. According to Kaga, a notable journalist devoted a Famitsu column to the game, and this prompted sales to pick up around half a year after release. As of 2002, Shadow Dragon and the Blade of Light had sold 329,087 units, being the third best-selling title in the series to that date.

According to Metacritic, the Nintendo Switch version received "mixed or average reviews", based on a weighted average score of 62 out of 100 from 29 critics. The website also stated that the game "understandably failed to impress modern critics." In 2023, Time Extension included the game on their "Best JRPGs of All Time" list.

=== Legacy ===
Despite the slow start, Shadow Dragon and the Blade of Light proved enough of a success that a sequel was commissioned. This would become Fire Emblem Gaiden, which was released in 1992. Shadow Dragon and the Blade of Light was partially remade as part of the third installment, Fire Emblem: Mystery of the Emblem, which also continued the story of Marth. A full remake for the Nintendo DS was released internationally under the title Fire Emblem: Shadow Dragon, marking the first time the content of the first Fire Emblem was made available outside Japan. The setting of Archanea would be used again for the remake of Fire Emblem: Mystery of the Emblem, Fire Emblem: New Mystery of the Emblem and the thirteenth entry, Fire Emblem Awakening.

Shadow Dragon and the Blade of Light not only launched the wider Fire Emblem series, but is also seen as the reason tactical role-playing genre became popular in Japan. It has thus been credited with indirectly influencing the creation of other notable games within the genre, including Tactics Ogre: Let Us Cling Together, Final Fantasy Tactics, and the Disgaea series. The basic mechanics within Shadow Dragon and the Blade of Light would form the basis for the gameplay of nearly all subsequent Fire Emblem titles. In addition to helping popularize the genre, it is also credited with pioneering multimedia advertising through its use of a live-action television commercial in addition to magazine previews, which would later be used for series such as The Legend of Zelda. Its combination of battle and story segments also provided inspiration for the gameplay of the Sakura Wars series.
