= Lucien Kempf =

American football coach (1905–1998)

Biographical details
- Born: December 26, 1905
- Died: September 10, 1998 (aged 92)

Coaching career (HC unless noted)
- 1927: Wagner

Head coaching record
- Overall: 1–3

Lucien Stephen Kempf Sr. (December 26, 1905 – September 10, 1998) was an American football coach. He served as the first head football coach in the history of Wagner College in Staten Island, New York.

== Head coaching record ==
| Year | Team | Overall | Conference | Standing | Bowl/playoffs |
|---|---|---|---|---|---|
Wagner Seahawks (Independent) (1927)
| 1927 | Wagner | 1–3 | | | |
| Wagner: | | 1–3 | | | |
| Total: | | 1–3 | | | |
