= List of Fire Emblem video games =

Fire Emblem series logo

Fire Emblem is a series of tactical role-playing video games developed by Intelligent Systems and published by Nintendo. Its first game released in Japan in 1990, and is credited with both originating and popularizing its genre. Counting original mainline games and remakes, seventeen titles have been released as of 2023. Since the release of the seventh game in the series, Nintendo has localized all but four Fire Emblem titles: Mystery of the Emblem, Genealogy of the Holy War, Thracia 776, and The Binding Blade for the West. Traditionally a hardcore series, incorporating permanent character death for units who fall in battle, the series has trended towards opening up to casual gamers with an optional casual mode, beginning with New Mystery of the Emblem in 2010.

== Main series ==
Title	Original release date		
Title	Japan	North America	PAL region
Fire Emblem: Shadow Dragon and the Blade of Light	April 20, 1990	December 4, 2020	December 4, 2020
Notes: Released on Famicom; Known in Japan as Fire Emblem: Ankoku Ryu to Hikari no Tsurugi (ファイアーエムブレム 暗黒竜と光の剣).; Also available on Virtual Console.; Remade as Fire Emblem: Shadow Dragon (Nintendo DS) - JP/EU (2008) NA/AU (2009).; Fan translation patch for the original game was released in 2011.; A limited-time Nintendo Switch digital port was announced on October 22, 2020, and was released on December 4, 2020.
Fire Emblem Gaiden	March 14, 1992	-	-
Notes: Released on Famicom.; Also available on Virtual Console.; Remade as Fire Emblem Echoes: Shadows of Valentia (Nintendo 3DS) - JP/NA/EU/AU (2017).; Fan translation patch for the original game was released in 2009.
Fire Emblem: Mystery of the Emblem	January 21, 1994	-	-
Notes: Released on Super Famicom.; Known in Japan as Fire Emblem: Monshō no Nazo (ファイアーエムブレム 紋章の謎).; Also available on Virtual Console.; Remade as Fire Emblem: New Mystery of the Emblem (Nintendo DS) - JP only (2010). Fan translation patch released in 2012.; Fan translation patch for the original game was released in 2009.
Fire Emblem: Genealogy of the Holy War	May 14, 1996	-	-
Notes: Released on Super Famicom.; Known in Japan as Fire Emblem: Seisen no Keifu (ファイアーエムブレム聖戦の系譜).; Also available on Virtual Console.; Never released outside of Japan. Working fan translation patch released in 2016.
Fire Emblem: Thracia 776	September 1, 1999	-	-
Notes: Released on Super Famicom through both Nintendo Power flash cartridge and standard ROM cartridge.; Also available on Virtual Console.; Never released outside of Japan. Full fan translation released in 2019.
Fire Emblem: The Binding Blade	March 29, 2002	-	-
Notes: Released on Game Boy Advance.; Known in Japan as Fire Emblem: Fūin no Tsurugi (ファイアーエムブレム封印の剣); Alternately translated as The Sword of Seals, but more frequently translated as The Binding Blade.; Also available on Virtual Console.; Never released outside of Japan. Full fan translation released in 2013.
Fire Emblem: The Blazing Blade	April 25, 2003	November 3, 2003	July 16, 2004
Notes: Released on Game Boy Advance.; Known in Japan as Fire Emblem: Rekka no Ken (ファイアーエムブレム 烈火の剣; lit Fire Emblem: The Sword of Flame).; Now officially known internationally as Fire Emblem: The Blazing Blade.; First entry in the series released worldwide.; Also released in Australia on February 20, 2004.; Also available on Virtual Console.
Fire Emblem: The Sacred Stones	October 7, 2004	May 23, 2005	November 4, 2005
Notes: Released on Game Boy Advance.; Known in Japan as Fire Emblem: Seima no Kōseki (ファイアーエムブレム 聖魔の光石; lit Fire Emblem: Holy Stones of Light and Darkness); Also available on Virtual Console.
Fire Emblem: Path of Radiance	April 20, 2005	October 17, 2005	November 4, 2005
Notes: Released on GameCube.; Known in Japan as Fire Emblem: Sōen no Kiseki (ファイアーエムブレム 蒼炎の軌跡; lit. Fire Emblem: Trail of the Blue Flame); Also released in Australia on December 1, 2005.
Fire Emblem: Radiant Dawn	February 22, 2007	November 11, 2007	March 14, 2008
Notes: Released on Wii.; Known in Japan as Fire Emblem: Akatsuki no Megami (ファイアーエムブレム 暁の女神; lit. Fire Emblem: The Goddess of Dawn).; Also released in Australia on April 10, 2008.
Fire Emblem Awakening	April 19, 2012	February 4, 2013	April 19, 2013
Notes: Released on Nintendo 3DS.; Also released in Australia on April 20, 2013.
Fire Emblem Fates	June 25, 2015	February 19, 2016	May 20, 2016
Notes: Released on Nintendo 3DS.; Known in Japan as Fire Emblem if.; Released across three versions: Birthright and Conquest released as physical copies, while Revelation released later as downloadable content.; In Japan, Birthright and Conquest released on June 25, 2015; Revelation released on July 9, 2015.; In North America, Birthright and Conquest released on February 19, 2016; Revelation released on March 10, 2016.; In Europe, Birthright and Conquest released on May 20, 2016; Revelation released on June 9, 2016.; In Australia, Birthright and Conquest released on May 21, 2016; Revelation released on June 10, 2016.
Fire Emblem: Three Houses	July 26, 2019	July 26, 2019	July 26, 2019
Notes: Released on Nintendo Switch; Released on July 26, 2019
Fire Emblem Engage	January 20, 2023	January 20, 2023	January 20, 2023
Notes: Released on Nintendo Switch; Released on January 20, 2023
Fire Emblem: Fortune's Weave	September 17, 2026	September 17, 2026	September 17, 2026
Notes: Released on Nintendo Switch 2; Released on September 17, 2026

== Remakes ==
Title	Original release date		
Title	Japan	North America	PAL region
Fire Emblem: Shadow Dragon	August 7, 2008	February 16, 2009	December 5, 2008
Notes: Released on Nintendo DS; Full remake of Fire Emblem: Shadow Dragon and the Blade of Light; Also released in Australia on February 26, 2009; Also available on Virtual Console.
Fire Emblem: New Mystery of the Emblem	July 15, 2010	-	-
Notes: Released on Nintendo DS.; The Japanese title is Faiā Emuburemu: Shin Monshō no Nazo ~Hikari to Kage no Eiyū~, literally Fire Emblem: New Mystery of the Emblem ~Heroes of Light and Shadow~; Full remake of Fire Emblem: Mystery of the Emblem.; First game in the series to remain exclusive to Japan since The Binding Blade.; Also includes BS Fire Emblem story content as "New Archanea Chronicles".; Fan translation patch for the game was released in 2012.
Fire Emblem Echoes: Shadows of Valentia	April 20, 2017	May 19, 2017	May 19, 2017
Notes: Released on Nintendo 3DS.; Known in Japan as Fire Emblem Echoes: Mō Hitori no Eiyū-ō (ファイアーエムブレム エコーズ もうひとりの英雄王; lit. Another Hero King).; Full remake of Fire Emblem Gaiden.; Also released in Australia on May 20.

== Spin-offs ==
Title	Original release date		
Title	Japan	North America	PAL region
BS Fire Emblem	September 28, 1997 - October 19, 1997	-	-
Notes: Released on Super Famicom for Satellaview broadcast service.; Set before Shadow Dragon and the Blade of Light, and forming an official part of the timeline of Shadow Dragon and the Blade of Light and Mystery of the Emblem; Technically the fifth entry in the series; originally treated as a spin-off outside the official mainline games, then later inducted into them by Nintendo from 2010 onward
Tokyo Mirage Sessions ♯FE	December 26, 2015	June 24, 2016	June 24, 2016
Notes: Released on Wii U; Crossover with Atlus's Shin Megami Tensei series; Developed by Atlus under supervision by Nintendo; Originally announced as Shin Megami Tensei X Fire Emblem; Also released in Australia on June 25, 2016; Released for Nintendo Switch as Tokyo Mirage Sessions ♯FE Encore on January 17, 2020
Fire Emblem Heroes	February 2, 2017	February 2, 2017	February 2, 2017
Notes: Released on iOS and Android.; Crossover title featuring characters from multiple Fire Emblem entries.; Features freemium gacha style gameplay.; Released worldwide on February 2, 2017.
Fire Emblem Warriors	September 28, 2017	October 20, 2017	October 20, 2017
Notes: Released for Nintendo Switch and New Nintendo 3DS.; Crossover title featuring characters from multiple Fire Emblem entries (mainly from Shadow Dragon, Awakening and Fates).; Co-developed with Koei Tecmo, featuring gameplay of the Dynasty Warriors series.
Fire Emblem Warriors: Three Hopes	June 24, 2022	June 24, 2022	June 24, 2022
Notes: Released for Nintendo Switch.; Crossover title featuring characters from the Three Houses game; Co-developed with Koei Tecmo, featuring gameplay of the Dynasty Warriors series.
Fire Emblem Shadows	September 25, 2025	September 25, 2025	September 25, 2025
Notes: Released for Android and iOS devices.; Social deduction strategy video game developed by Intelligent Systems
