= Fire Emblem Engage =

2023 video game

- Developer: Intelligent Systems
- Publisher: Nintendo
- Directors: Tsutomu Tei; Kenta Nakanishi
- Producers: Masahiro Higuchi; Genki Yokota; Toyokazu Nonaka
- Artists: Mika Pikazo; Takafumi Teraoka; Hiromi Tanaka
- Writer: Nami Komuro
- Composers: Yasuhisa Baba; Kazuki Komai; Hiroki Morishita; Takeru Kanazaki; Fumihiro Isobe; Takafumi Wada
- Series: Fire Emblem
- Engine: Unity
- Platform: Nintendo Switch
- Release: January 20, 2023
- Genre: Tactical role-playing
- Mode: Single player

Fire Emblem Engage (Note: Japanese: ファイアーエムブレム エンゲージ, Hepburn: Faiā Emuburemu Engēji) is a 2023 tactical role-playing game developed by Intelligent Systems and published by Nintendo for the Nintendo Switch. It is the seventeenth installment in the Fire Emblem series and follows Alear, a dragon in human form, who awakens from a thousand-year slumber and quickly becomes embroiled in a conflict with the forces of the Fell Dragon Sombron. Alear travels the land of Elyos gaining allies while fighting against the armies of the rival Kingdom of Elusia and Sombron's resurrected undead forces; the player controls and maneuvers Alear's army in these battles. One of the core parts of both the setting and the gameplay are twelve magic rings that contain phantasmal copies of characters from previous Fire Emblem games. Characters wearing these "Emblem Rings" can "Engage" to gain vast power from summoning and merging with these phantoms. Both Alear and Sombron seek to gain control of the rings; possession of all twelve will allow a feat of immense magic to be performed.

Intelligent Systems designed the game to have a fresh new art style, with colorful characters and 3D animation models, in comparison to earlier games in the series that would often show 2D still portraits for dialogue and other scenes. It was intended to be a heroic fantasy quest that followed a protagonist growing and maturing into a heroic role to save the world. As with previous Fire Emblem entries, the turn-based gameplay consists of maneuvering characters within an army across grid-based maps, who then battle foes.

Fire Emblem Engage received generally positive reviews from critics. However, it was not as well-received as its predecessor, Fire Emblem: Three Houses. Reviewers had positive sentiment toward the main gameplay of Engage, considering it both strategically deep and enjoyable. While its gameplay innovations, music, and visuals were praised, critics felt that the story, characters, and worldbuilding were lackluster and unmemorable. The game received a downloadable content (DLC) season pass, including a full new side story. The game sold over 1.6 million copies in the three months after its release.

== Gameplay ==
A preview showing the potential result of combat, with the map in the background, in Chapter 14

Fire Emblem Engage is a tactical role-playing game. Players control the main character whose name and gender can be specified at the start of the game; by default, the main character's name is Alear. The player controls Alear and their allies through a series of battles as the plot advances; there are also optional "skirmish" battles and "Paralogue" side missions if the player wants to further strengthen their team. In-between these story battles, the player can have their characters relax and engage in social activities with each other. New characters will regularly join Alear's team as the game progresses; these characters have their own personal starting statistics (stats), stat growth rates, and unique personal skill. Each character has a specific set of other characters they can gain "support levels" with. As their support level increases, units unlock conversations and increased bonuses when fighting nearby in battle.

The battles feature a grid map, similar to a large chessboard, where both the characters under player control and enemy units are laid out. The flow of the game is turn-based, with the game alternating between a player phase where player units move and act and an enemy phase where hostile units move and act. The maps feature a variety of pathways and obstructions. As an example, rivers are impassable to ground-based units and only traversable by flying units. Other terrain grants defensive bonuses; for example, fortresses give an occupying unit an evasion boost and regenerate a portion of the unit's health at the start of the turn.

Units have a character class which determines their available weapon types, movement capabilities, and affects the growth of their personal stats. For example, an armored class might have low movement and slow speed, but have a high defense stat allowing them to take little damage from enemy physical attacks. Characters are equipped with weapons, magical tomes, and other items by the player which the characters use to attack hostile units or heal friendly units. Magical staves allow characters who can use them to perform other utility actions such as creating temporary obstructions on the map or warping units across long distances. When a unit is commanded to engage in combat, the stats of both the attacker and defender are compared to determine how powerful and accurate the attacks are. The game features a "weapon triangle" seen in earlier games of the series: swords have advantage over axes, lances have advantage over swords, and axes have advantage over lances. Additionally, brawling attacks have advantage over bows, daggers, and magical tomes. If a unit attacks with weapon triangle advantage and hits their target, the defender is inflicted with a "Break" status that stops them from counterattacking both in the current combat and their next combat. Two new mechanics are Chain Attacks, which allow certain classes to chip in and help an ally's attack on a nearby foe, and Chain Guards, which allow certain support classes to completely nullify an attack on an adjoining ally. In addition to three difficulty levels, Engage has both a "Classic" and a "Casual" mode the player selects from. In Classic mode, if a character falls to 0 HP and is defeated, they are lost forever, never to be deployed again. In Casual mode, defeated characters are only unavailable for the remainder of the map, but will be restored for later chapters of the story.

A core mechanic unique to Engage is equipping characters with powerful Emblem Rings which allow the character to fight alongside the heroes of previous Fire Emblem games. Emblem Rings allow the character to learn new weapon proficiencies and inherit skills related to the Emblem, even if the ring is later moved to another character. While a ring is equipped, the character gains stat bonuses and new skills. Additionally, characters can "Engage" with their Emblem to transform into a fused state for a limited number of turns. Engaging unlocks additional passive skills; access to the Emblem's weapon(s); and a single-use Engage action, usually a powerful attack. After the Engage expires, characters refill an Engage meter by partaking in regular combat. When the meter is full, the character can Engage again. In addition to the main Emblem Rings, there is a system of "Bond Rings" where characters who don't have access to an Emblem Ring can be given weaker rings. Characters featured as Emblems in Engage include Marth from Fire Emblem: Shadow Dragon and the Blade of Light and its sequels; Celica from Gaiden and its remake Echoes; Sigurd from Genealogy of the Holy War; Leif from Thracia 776; Roy from The Binding Blade; Lyn from The Blazing Blade; Eirika and Ephraim from The Sacred Stones; Ike from Path of Radiance; Micaiah from Radiant Dawn; Lucina from Awakening; Corrin from Fates; and Byleth from Three Houses. Just as characters can gain support conversations and bonuses with each other, characters and Emblems can increase a bond level between them, which unlocks conversations and grants bonuses in battle.

After battles are completed, the characters can return to the Somniel, a floating refuge that acts as a hub location. It is somewhat similar to the role of Garreg Mach Monastery in Three Houses. On the Somniel, the player can shop for new equipment, forge their weapons to be stronger, play minigames, have Alear talk with both human allies and Emblems, and interact with social simulation elements. For example, in the Somniel cafe, the player can arrange meals via previously collecting ingredients, having the chef cook them into a dish, and picking units to share the resulting meal with. Other minigames include working out, fishing, polishing Emblem Rings, riding a flying wyvern through an obstacle course, battling in an arena, and more.

While the main game is single-player, there are two optional quasi-multiplayer modes available with a Nintendo Switch Online account at the Somniel: cooperative Relay Trials and competitive Outrealm Trials. The computer AI still controls enemies rather than another player directly, however.

== Plot ==
Alear, the Divine Dragon and main character, in both male and female forms; they were the first character created for Engage. Alear's striking appearance, with the bright red and blue hair, eyes, and outfit, attracted attention and commentary.

=== Setting ===
Engage is set on the continent of Elyos, a land divided into five regions: Lythos, Firene, Brodia, Elusia, and Solm. Lythos is a central holy land reserved for the Divine Dragon and their attendants. The realms of Firene, Brodia, and Solm largely cooperate with each other, while the kingdoms of Brodia and Elusia are on hostile terms, fighting frequent skirmishes over their borderlands. Most citizens of Firene, Brodia, and Solm revere the Divine Dragon as their deity, while most Elusians worship the Fell Dragon. Dragons live in human form the vast majority of their long lifespans, with only a select few capable of transforming into a classic draconic form, and even then doing so only rarely, an aspect similar to other games in the Fire Emblem series.

One thousand years prior to the events of the plot, a great war was fought between Lumera, the Divine Dragon and Sombron, the Fell Dragon. Sombron was gravely wounded, and the country he had ruled, Gradlon, was sunk beneath the ocean. The most important weapons of the ancient war were the Emblem Rings, twelve magic rings that gave their wielders incredible power. To prevent any one person from easily gathering and misusing their power, the rings were spread across Elyos, with six of the rings entrusted to the human countries, and Lythos keeping the remaining six rings under the personal watch of Lumera and her stewards.

=== Story ===
Alear, a dragon, is awoken from a one-thousand-year slumber. They have amnesia, and only vague memories of fighting against Sombron one thousand years ago with the aid of Emblem Marth, and are told they were wounded in the struggle. It quickly becomes apparent that Sombron is recovering, too, as his allies enter Lythos to capture its Emblem Rings: undead known as Corrupted and an army from the Kingdom of Elusia. An unknown young woman working with the invasion force kills the Divine Dragon, Lumera, leaving only her child Alear to take on her mantle as the Divine Dragon. While others are surprised to learn that the supposedly childless Lumera had a successor, adherents quickly accept Alear as the new Divine Dragon.

Alear and their allies decide to set out on a quest to gather the scattered Emblem Rings and use them to defeat Sombron, while Corrupted undead wreak havoc and Elusia's armies vie with Alear in the struggle to take control of the Emblem Rings. Alear visits both Firene and Brodia, gathering rings and recruiting allies. Alear also meets and befriends Veyle, a mysterious, naive young woman who is searching for her lost sibling. Alear attacks Elusia in a bid to prevent the restoration of Sombron's full power, but fails to arrive in time, as King Hyacinth of Elusia had already successfully performed the sacrificial ritual to revive Sombron. Sombron devours Hyacinth for even more power, and takes personal control of Elusia. Worse, it is revealed that Alear's friend Veyle and the unknown enemy commander who killed Lumera are the same person. Veyle, saying she is Sombron's daughter, steals the six Emblem Rings that Alear has gathered so far, meaning their associated Emblems will serve Sombron. Defeated, Alear and their allies flee from an army of Corrupted, Veyle, and a team of Sombron's most trusted generals called the Four Hounds.

The heroes gain renewed hope when Ivy, Hyacinth's daughter, and her personal retainers come to Alear's aid, bringing two of the Emblem Rings that Elusia had controlled. Alear starts a new quest to gain Emblem Rings with which to challenge Elusia's armies and travels to Solm, the desert queendom; returns to Firene; and invades Elusia a second time, all while fighting against Veyle and the Hounds. It becomes apparent that Veyle has two personalities: one innocent and trusting, and another cruel and loyal to Sombron. The Hounds and Alear come to the realization that Alear, too, is a child of Sombron and the lost sibling that the innocent Veyle had been seeking. Lumera had adopted Alear after they defected from Sombron's forces during the ancient war.

In a climactic struggle back at the ruined castle of Lythos, the evil Veyle is defeated, allowing the innocent Veyle to break the magical mind control placed on her. However, Sombron kills Alear, who dies protecting Veyle, and collects all twelve rings. Sombron uses the power of the Emblems to raise the fallen land of Gradlon and open the way into the broader multiverse. Veyle uses her fell powers to temporarily resurrect Alear as a Corrupted, and the two recover the twelve rings discarded by Sombron, although Corrupted Alear soon begins disintegrating. The Emblems unleash a secret power to resurrect a person and revive Alear as the new thirteenth Emblem, the Fire Emblem. After defeating Sombron's minions and disabling a magical barrier, Emblem Alear and the party chase after Sombron, who has left for a gateway to the multiverse. There, they learn that Sombron was originally from another universe, and had been exiled to Elyos along with an Emblem known as the Emblem of Foundations. After seemingly being abandoned by this "Zero Emblem", he sought to find it again, and had arranged his wars to gain power sufficient to leave his exile. Emblem Alear is unwilling to let him escape from his crimes, and kills Sombron in a final battle. Alear becomes the new Divine Dragon Monarch, while Veyle becomes the ruler of Gradlon. The Emblems are seemingly lost forever with the closing of the multiverse gate, but a post-credits scene suggests that they may yet still function.

=== Fell Xenologue ===
"Fell Xenologue" is a downloadable content (DLC) side-story that runs parallel to Engage's main story. In it, Alear visits a parallel version of Elyos where most everything is inverted: the royalty of the four nations have opposite personalities to the main game and are hostile foes to defeat, while the parallel versions of the Four Hounds are heroic allies known as the Four Winds. In this world, Alear and Sombron are both dead, having killed each other in a prior struggle. Seven Emblem Bracelets containing the Emblems added as DLC are the point of contention.

Dragon twins Nel and Nil pray for aid in reclaiming the seven Emblem Bracelets. With the help of the Four Winds, the party defeats the armies of these parallel versions of Firene, Brodia, Elusia, and Solm and takes their bracelets. Nel reveals that all of the armies and royals they've encountered were actually Corrupted, their living selves long dead. A suddenly hostile Nil takes the bracelets collected so far. The group follows him to an alternate version of the Somniel that has fallen from the sky. Nil, driven insane by a corrupted dragonstone of Sombron's, demands Alear use their power to break the seal on the final bracelet by threatening Nel's life. Alear cooperates and Nil obtains the ultimate power of the seven bracelets, transforming him into a powerful fell dragon form. Nel, Alear, and the Four Winds battle and defeat Nil.

After the battle, Nil reveals that his real name is Rafal and that the original Nil, Nel's twin, died in the war a thousand years prior. Rafal had taken the role at the original Nil's request. Nel stabs herself in the stomach with her blade. Rafal is overcome with grief and vows to spend the next thousand years reviving her. With no one left in their ruined version of Elyos, the Four Winds agree to accompany Alear back to their world, and are eventually followed by a revived Nel and the repentant Rafal.

== Development ==
Engage was developed by Intelligent Systems, the company responsible for most of the main entries of the Fire Emblem series. Intelligent Systems (IS) has a long history of working closely with Nintendo, with the vast majority of their games exclusive for Nintendo consoles, and Engage was a collaboration between IS and Nintendo EPD Group No. 2. Both Fire Emblem: Three Houses and Engage started development around the same time with work proceeding in parallel; Three Houses was mostly created by a separate team from Koei Tecmo working in collaboration with IS. One of the goals behind Engage was to do something different from Three Houses, which has a more epic and adult war story, and to hearken back to Awakening as a work with appeal to a broad audience.

According to Kenta Nakanishi, director from Nintendo EPD Group No. 2, a goal was for Engage to be thought of as a traditional heroic fantasy game by the playerbase. This manifested in placing Alear very prominently in the artwork and making their personal growth and development as they grew into their heroic role a core part of the game. Tsutomu Tei, the director of Engage from Intelligent Systems, thought that the original Fire Emblem: Shadow Dragon and the Blade of Light as well as the three Game Boy Advance Fire Emblem games had been such heroic quests, and were a large part of why they resonated with audiences. Tei also said that the decision for Engage to have a single path, rather than the branching paths in Three Houses and Fates, was made early. Genki Yokota, producer from Nintendo, said that some players were intimidated by too many branching paths and would assume they had to play all of them. Tei felt that a simplified story structure would allow players to put all their focus on the tactical gameplay.

The idea of the Emblem system, according to Nakanishi, came up when the developers were discussing the marriage system from the previous titles Fire Emblem: Genealogy of the Holy War, Awakening, and Fates. Those games allowed customized children to be recruited whose skills and stats would vary based on their parents, but experimenting with different combinations would essentially require restarting the game. Swappable Emblem Rings would allow similar customization where characters could be given Emblem Rings that improved and modified their fighting style, but in a flexible way that encouraged experimentation. The staff wanted to make it so that the Emblems would have different effects when used by different characters while still being comprehensible to the player, and came up with the subdivision of classes into eight types. Emblems would then have unique effects based on the class type using the ring. One of the key moments of the game is when the Emblem Rings are taken from the heroes; one gameplay reason was to give the player an explicit moment to reconsider who should have which ring, rather than statically never switching the rings around and missing out on the possibilities.

The game's art style was largely driven by Mika Pikazo, an illustrator new to the Fire Emblem series. The team at Intelligent Systems was impressed with her vivid and colorful drawings that "popped". This perfectly matched their goal of appealing to a broad audience, including younger players. Pikazo was already a fan of the franchise, and she was brought on as the main character designer. It was felt that significantly changing the art style from Three Houses with a new illustrator would implicitly communicate that the world and mechanics would be a fresh new experience. Pikazo's art was made with the intention of the designs functioning well as 3D models. The graphics programmers set a goal for themselves to adapt Pikazo's detailed designs in full in the 3D models, which allowed them to avoid use of 2D artwork in-game almost entirely. Pikazo said that her favorite character to make was Alear, the first character she worked on.

Intelligent Systems moved away from proprietary internal game engines for Engage and opted to use the Unity framework instead. Character models were created using Maya, with Adobe Substance 3D for texturing; ZBrush for normal baking; and Shuriken, an internal Unity particle system, for effects.

A team of multiple composers were involved in making the soundtrack to Engage. Each major region of the game was assigned to a different composer with the goal of ensuring each country had its own musical feel and style. Tei also strongly themed each region to make them easy to recognize, including giving a characteristic color to each region: white and black for the lands of the Divine and Fell Dragon, blue for Firene, red for Brodia, green for Elusia, and yellow for Solm.

For the DLC "Fell Xenologue" chapter, the developers wanted to give a different atmosphere from the main story and explore a reality where usually friendly allies were hostile, leading to the creation of such an inverted parallel world.

== Release ==
The game was publicly announced in a September 2022 Nintendo Direct. On November 16, a story trailer was released, showing Alear's promise to their dying mother, and an evil version of Marth. The following week, Nintendo uploaded a gameplay trailer showcasing new characters and returning protagonists from the series.

The game released on January 20, 2023, exclusively for the Nintendo Switch. A premium "Divine Edition" packaged version of the game was released in addition to the basic version; the Divine Edition includes an artbook, poster, steelbook case, and art cards depicting the characters of earlier Fire Emblem games featured as Emblems. The release was concurrent with an Expansion Pass, purchase of which would grant access to DLC to be released across four waves. The first wave was available on release and included two new Emblem Bracelets (equivalent of Emblem Rings): one with a combination of Edelgard, Dimitri, and Claude from Fire Emblem: Three Houses, and another with Tiki from Fire Emblem: Shadow Dragon and the Blade of Light and its direct sequels. The second wave was released on February 8, 2023, immediately following a Nintendo Direct. The second wave included three new Emblem Bracelets: Hector from Fire Emblem: The Blazing Blade, Soren from Fire Emblem: Path of Radiance, and Camilla from Fire Emblem Fates. Wave 3 of the expansion pass was made available on March 8. It included a combination of Chrom and Robin from Fire Emblem Awakening and Veronica from Fire Emblem Heroes. Most of the DLC Emblems also include a "Divine Paralogue" chapter to go with them, where Alear's team faces a special challenge map before acquiring the Emblem Bracelet. Wave 4 of the expansion pass was released on April 4 and included a new "Fell Xenologue" side story. Completion of the "Fell Xenologue" allows five new characters to be recruited: three of them alternate heroic versions of the Four Hounds in the main game, and two new dragons named Nel and Nil. Two new classes are also unlocked for use.

The patches released with the DLC included some free updates to the base game, largely to the Somniel. These included making accessing a skill inheritance menu more convenient, adding new recreation activities that built support levels between units, and a wishing well where unneeded items can be traded in for randomized new items.

Like other games in the Fire Emblem series, Engage has had promotional tie-in events and characters featured in the series crossover mobile game Fire Emblem Heroes.

A manga adaptation of Engage was created by Kazurō Kyō and published in Shueisha's Saikyō Jump magazine and Shōnen Jump+ website. The prologue was released in February 2023 and the first main chapter released on March 3.

An official CD/DVD version of the soundtrack was released in March 2024.

== Reception ==
Reception

Aggregate scores
Aggregator	Score
Metacritic	80/100
OpenCritic	84% recommend

Review scores
Publication	Score
Destructoid	9/10
Digital Trends	4/5
Famitsu	36/40
Game Informer	9/10
GameSpot	7/10
GamesRadar+	2.5/5
IGN	9/10
Nintendo Life	9/10
Nintendo World Report	9/10
PCMag	3.5/5
Video Games Chronicle	3/5
Siliconera	10/10

=== Critical reception ===
Fire Emblem Engage received "generally favorable" reviews according to the review aggregator Metacritic, where it has an aggregate score of 80/100 based on 129 reviews. Fellow review aggregator OpenCritic assessed that the game received strong approval, being recommended by 84% of critics. Reviewers generally considered the gameplay of Engage excellent. PJ O'Reilly of Nintendo Life wrote that the gameplay was not merely the best in the series, but was of the finest quality of turn-based tactical RPGs in general. Even reviewers who ultimately disliked the game tended to grant this; Hirun Cryer of GamesRadar+ called the work as a whole a missed opportunity, but still acknowledged it as one of the most absorbing turn-based games in years judged by its gameplay. Exceptions to this gameplay praise were mostly in the Somniel: the optional minigames there were considered repetitive and uninteresting, although at least skippable. The optional quasi-multiplayer modes were generally considered best skipped by reviewers; Will Greenwald of PCMag called these modes underwhelming. Reviewers generally thought that the graphics and soundtrack were outstanding, with impressive cutscenes, exciting combat animations, and fitting music for each region.

Opinions were mixed on the game's story and characters. Most reviewers agreed that the plot was weak, although they differed in their views on how much it detracted from the game. Mike Mahardy of Polygon called the plot "nothing short of terrible", but admired the pacing and the sharp focus on gameplay: the player can quickly speed through the brief cutscenes and go from battle to battle. Chris Carter of Destructoid similarly wrote that the plot had a lot of energy and kept moving forward. Melanie Zawodniak of Nintendo World Report, while acknowledging the plot was thinner than previous entries, had a more positive view of the characters of Engage and considered them one of her favorite casts in the franchise. Other reviewers were outright hostile to the cast, calling the support conversations between characters boring and the game's writing terrible.

The fanservice in the game's callbacks to the past Fire Emblem heroes as Emblems also received mixed critical opinions. Brendan Graeber of IGN admired the result and the reverence Engage showed for previous Fire Emblem characters, while others thought that the Emblems took away limited screen time from the human characters. Ash Parrish of The Verge criticized the support conversations between characters and Emblems; rather than letting the player learn more about heroes of earlier Fire Emblem games, the conversations were instead shallow, short, and uninteresting. The Emblems hardly ever talked with each other, either. More positively, the design on the "Paralogue" missions was praised; the late-game Paralogues are themed around a specific Emblem and feature a battle based on a chapter from that Emblem's original game.

Reviewers frequently compared the game with previous series entry Fire Emblem: Three Houses, in particular the change from a heartbreaking conflict between former friends to a more classic good vs. evil plotline. Jordan Middler of Video Games Chronicle lamented that Engage threw away so many of the strengths of Three Houses that made it such a huge hit, and called it a missed opportunity. Sisi Jiang of Kotaku wrote that Engage "took ten steps back" in terms of story from Three Houses. Renata Price of Waypoint also said that Engage puzzlingly failed at all of the most notable strengths of Three Houses, such as in its far blander characters and unambitious setting, but that the excellently designed missions and deep tactical RPG gameplay of Engage surpassed the gameplay experience of Three Houses.

=== Sales ===
Fire Emblem Engage was the best-selling retail game during its first week of release in Japan, selling around 145,000 physical copies across the country. By March 31, 2023, Engage had sold 1.61 million copies worldwide. According to Nintendo's list of games with the best digital sales on the Nintendo Switch eShop in Japan, Engage had the second-highest digital sales during the first half of 2023, behind The Legend of Zelda: Tears of the Kingdom; and the tenth-highest digital sales over all of 2023.

=== Accolades ===
Fire Emblem Engage was nominated for "Nintendo Game of the Year" at the Golden Joystick Awards and "Best Sim/Strategy Game" at The Game Awards 2023, losing to The Legend of Zelda: Tears of the Kingdom and Pikmin 4, respectively.
