= Marth (Fire Emblem) =

Video game character

- Fire Emblem character
- Marth in the Fire Emblem Fates 4koma book
- First game: Fire Emblem: Shadow Dragon and the Blade of Light (1990)
- Created by: Shouzou Kaga
- Voiced by: English: Spike Spencer (OVA); Yuri Lowenthal (2015–present); Japanese: Hikaru Midorikawa; Ai Orikasa (young; OVA); Yū Kobayashi (young; Fire Emblem Heroes)

In-universe information
- Significant other: Princess Caeda (spouse)
- Origin: Archanea

Marth (Japanese: マルス, Hepburn: Marusu) is a character from the Fire Emblem franchise, developed by Intelligent Systems and owned by Nintendo. He is the protagonist in the first and the third games in the series, Fire Emblem: Shadow Dragon and the Blade of Light, and Fire Emblem: Mystery of the Emblem, as well as their respective remakes, Fire Emblem: Shadow Dragon and Fire Emblem: New Mystery of the Emblem.

Marth's first appearance outside of Japan was in the Fire Emblem: Mystery of the Emblem OVA. Marth and Roy's inclusions in Nintendo's Super Smash Bros. series is cited as a reason Nintendo started releasing the games internationally, starting with Fire Emblem: The Blazing Blade. In December 2020, Marth's original Famicom game and the first installment in the Fire Emblem series was localized and released outside of Japan for the first time to commemorate the franchise's 30th anniversary.

== Creation and development ==
Marth was one of the characters created for Fire Emblem: Shadow Dragon and the Blade of Light by the game's designer and writer Shouzou Kaga. According to Kaga, though Marth takes a prominent role in the story, he is not technically the main protagonist, beyond being required to survive in battle. He stated that it was fine for people to see the story as revolving around any characters the player is partial to. During early development, a scene would have depicted Marth kneeling in grief next to the body of his retainer Jagen in a pool of Jagen's blood: this was designed to be a symbolic moment of Marth violently coming of age by losing a father figure. Due to hardware limitations, this and other similar scenes needed to be cut. Marth's character designer is currently unknown, though the graphics and character art for Shadow Dragon and the Blade of Light was cooperatively handled by Tohru Ohsawa, Naotaka Ohnishi, Saotshi Machida and Toshitaka Muramatsu. Marth's appearance underwent alterations for promotional posters, having a slightly different hairstyle and an altered shade of blue for his hair.

Marth was redesigned for Fire Emblem: Mystery of the Emblem by the game's character artist Katsuyoshi Koya. For the first game's remake, Fire Emblem: Shadow Dragon, Marth underwent a redesign. The staff's main aim for the redesign was to make the character look and feel fresh while not straying too far from what fans had come to expect. His redesign was handled by Ghost in the Shell artist Masamune Shirow. He was redesigned once again for the third game's remake, New Mystery of the Emblem, by Daisuke Izuka. Marth's design for his appearance in downloadable content for Fire Emblem Awakening was by Senri Kita, the character artist for Fire Emblem: Radiant Dawn. This, along with other character redesigns featured in the game's DLC, was dubbed an "underworld" design. When designing Marth for Fire Emblem Warriors, the designers took input from female staff members involved in the game's development in order to make him more appealing to women. Director Usuda Hiroya noted that he was portrayed as a gentle character in Fire Emblem Awakening and Fire Emblem Fates, but adjusted his face and appearance to make him more manly. An interviewer remarked that male fans of the series viewed him as boyish. When adding past characters to Fire Emblem Engage, the designers decided to include Marth first due to him being the first protagonist in the series.

Super Smash Bros. developer Masahiro Sakurai initially wanted Marth to be part of the roster for the original game due to a desire for Fire Emblem to appear in the series and to have another sword fighter, but time constraints prevented this. Sakurai felt that Marth contrasted well with fellow Super Smash Bros. fighter Link, arguing that Marth was more technique-based while Link was strength-based. He later added Roy, the protagonist of Fire Emblem: Binding Blade, who was based on Marth's moveset. The developers of Super Smash Bros. Melee originally intended to make Marth playable only in the Japanese version of the game, but when he garnered favorable attention during the game's North American localization, they decided to keep both him and fellow Fire Emblem protagonist Roy in the North American and European versions. Sakurai redesigned the character for Super Smash Bros. Brawl, where he was included as a playable character alongside other Fire Emblem protagonists. By this time, Marth had also been redesigned for Shadow Dragon, with Sakurai being shocked when he saw it. He commented that, if he had known earlier, he would have incorporated the new design into the game rather than his own. Marth's later appearances in the Super Smash Bros. series were brought in line with his design from New Mystery of the Emblem.

In the original video animation adaptation of Mystery of the Emblem, Marth was voiced by Hikaru Midorikawa, with Ai Orikasa voicing him as a child. Midorikawa reprised the role in Super Smash Bros. Melee, and his voice lines recorded for the game were reused in Super Smash Bros. Brawl and Super Smash Bros. for Nintendo 3DS and Wii U. Sakurai explained that these lines were reused due to liking his voice lines in Super Smash Bros. Melee so much. Due to not being contracted to voice Marth in Super Smash Bros. for Nintendo 3DS and Wii U, Midorikawa believed Marth would not appear in it, and remarked that he wished to record lines for Marth in the Super Smash Bros. series again due to his voice being less young and wanting to reflect Marth looking cooler. In the OVA's English dub, Marth was voiced by Spike Spencer. His name was localized as "Mars", which was put down to the vague pronunciation of the katakana of Marth's name. Since Code Name: S.T.E.A.M., Marth has been voiced in all of his video game appearances by Yuri Lowenthal in English (except Tokyo Mirage Sessions ♯FE) and Hikaru Midorikawa in Japanese.

== Game appearances ==
Marth debuted in 1990 with the release of Fire Emblem: Shadow Dragon and the Blade of Light in Japan. He is portrayed as a well-liked figure in the game's story, gaining more allies as he progresses through the story. He is a Lord, a class unique to him in this game. Marth is forced to flee his home kingdom of Altea after it is invaded by a military alliance of humans and Dragons led by the Shadow Dragon, Medeus and the Sorcerer Gharnef. He then goes on a quest to form a rebellion against Medeus, gathering allies from throughout the continent of Archanea such as his childhood friend, Princess Caeda, Jagen, his retainer, Nyna, the last survivor of Archanea's royal family and Hardin of Aurelis whom becomes co-leader of the league Marth forms. He eventually obtains the legendary items, the Falchion Sword and Fire Emblem Shield, both of which later appear in other Fire Emblem titles.

In the game's sequel, Fire Emblem: Mystery of the Emblem, released on January 21, 1994, and in the 2010 extended remake, Fire Emblem: New Mystery of the Emblem, Marth returns to his role as the story's protagonist. Whilst on an expedition for his friend, Hardin, Marth is suddenly betrayed and his kingdom is invaded. Marth works together with his allies, finding out why Hardin changed, breaking the Curse of the Fire Emblem and facing a revived Gharnef and Shadow Dragon Medeus. In the game's ending, Marth marries Caeda and unites the Kingdoms of the continent.

Marth is a significant figure in the Fire Emblem series. Though Marth kills many people as part of warfare, he is known merciful and empathetic even to his foes. Marth's good nature often helps him win over former enemies and turn them into allies.

In Fire Emblem Awakening, Marth is referenced when Lucina, his distant descendant disguises herself as Marth. Marth is available as both a paid downloadable content character in the "Champions of Yore 1" DLC expansion, and as two different characters available through the "SpotPass" feature. Marth additionally appears in Fire Emblem Heroes in multiple different costumes and variations. Marth took second place among male Fire Emblem characters in the "Choose Your Legend" contest in Heroes, behind the Gatekeeper from Fire Emblem: Three Houses, resulting in him receiving a special "Brave" variant. He had narrowly missed out on entering the top two multiple times beforehand.

Marth returns in Fire Emblem Engage, as a partner to the game's protagonist Alear. Along with other previous protagonists of the series, Marth is summoned as an "Emblem", a replica of the original Marth. He fights alongside Alear to defeat the Fell Dragon Sombron.

Marth debuted in the Super Smash Bros. series in Super Smash Bros. Melee, where he is an unlockable character alongside fellow Fire Emblem protagonist Roy. He is an agile character and fights with his Falchion, with the most power being concentrated in the tip of his blade. He has a technique that allows him to charge a sword slash, as well as a counterattack that deals damage back to opponents if they attack him during this technique. He also has a Sword Dance attack that requires specific input in order to have Marth execute each sword slash. Marth reappears in the 2008 Wii title Super Smash Bros. Brawl, where his moveset was largely unchanged, with the exception of an easier Sword Dance execution and a shortening of his sword. He also gets a Final Smash, an extra powerful attack, called Critical Hit, where he dashes forth and deals a powerful sword blow. This attack is accompanied by a health meter from the Fire Emblem games and is the only Final Smash in Brawl that instantly knocks out its targets. In the game's story mode, the "Subspace Emissary", he teams up with Ike from Fire Emblem: Path of Radiance and Fire Emblem: Radiant Dawn and Meta Knight from the Kirby series. Marth is also playable in Super Smash Bros. for Nintendo 3DS and Wii U, using his character design from New Mystery of the Emblem. Like all other playable characters in these games, he received an Amiibo figure. Lucina was also added to these games, featuring nearly identical moves, with the only difference being that the tip of Marth's sword does the most damage, while Lucina's sword is more balanced. Marth returned in Super Smash Bros. Ultimate for the Nintendo Switch. Lucina was also included, being given the label of an Echo Fighter, a character closely based on another.

By using Marth's respective Amiibo figure, Marth can be unlocked as a playable character in the games Code Name: S.T.E.A.M. and Fire Emblem Fates using the New Nintendo 3DS' Near Field Communication function. Marth also appears in a crossover between Fire Emblem Heroes and Dragalia Lost.

=== In other media ===
An anime under the title Fire Emblem was released in 1996, adapting a part of the first game's plot. Marth's name is romanized as 'Mars' and he is given the surname of 'Lowell'. The anime ended production after only two episodes were finished. The OVA was released in the United States in April 1998. Marth is featured as a card in both of the final expansion sets for the Fire Emblem Trading Card Game along with other characters from Fire Emblem: Mystery of the Emblem, and also appears as a promotional card.

== Reception ==
Marth has received generally positive reception, identified as the most famous character in the series by Official Nintendo Magazine and a popular character by GamesRadar and IGN. A Fire Emblem: Awakening poll conducted by Nintendo of America found that Marth was the most popular character among participants. In North American Fire Emblem character popularity polls running up to the release of Fire Emblem Heroes, Marth was ranked number 6th out of all Fire Emblem male characters. Inside Games writer Gawai Strings felt that Marth was a particularly important character in the series due to him being the first protagonist of a Fire Emblem remake and the first of a Fire Emblem two-parter. They argued that he was the face of the series and among the most frequently appearing.

Marth's inclusion in the Super Smash Bros. series of video games popularized both him and Fire Emblem in the West; it is cited as a reason Nintendo began releasing the games internationally, beginning with The Blazing Blade. Series producer Toru Narihiro attributed an increase in reputation for both Marth and fellow Fire Emblem character Ike to their appearances in Super Smash Bros. Brawl, adding that their reputations grew beyond the staff's expectations. Die Hard Game Fan writer Aileen Coe stated that, at the time of the release of the 2003 Fire Emblem: The Blazing Blade, American fans were expecting to see Marth in the game, believing a character to be Marth due to having blue hair. GamesRadar+ writer Henry Gilbert noted that Marth's use of a sword and his blue hair served as an inspiration for future Fire Emblem protagonists, including Ike, Hector, and Ephraim. RPGFan writer Josh Louis stated that he first learned of Marth's existence from Super Smash Bros. Melee, remarking how excited he was to play as him in a Fire Emblem game with the announcement of Fire Emblem: Shadow Dragon. Marth's Amiibo figure became a rare collectible, fetching prices several times higher than the list price on second-hand markets. This rarity was attributed to its low stock when compared to figures for characters like Mario and Link. Shack News writer David Craddock felt that the "mystery" surrounding Marth and Roy in Super Smash Bros. made them more appealing to players. He also felt that there was excitement among fans over discovering a new series, giving them the opportunity to experience new characters, stories, and gameplay.
