= Roy (Fire Emblem) =

Fire Emblem character

- Fire Emblem character
- Roy in Fire Emblem: The Binding Blade
- First appearance: Super Smash Bros. Melee (2001)
- First game: Fire Emblem: The Binding Blade (2002)
- Designed by: Eiji Kaneda
- Voiced by: EN: Ray Chase; JP: Jun Fukuyama

Roy (Japanese: ロイ, Hepburn: Roi) is a character from Nintendo and Intelligent Systems' Fire Emblem video game series, who first appeared in the 2001 crossover fighting game Super Smash Bros. Melee, along with fellow Fire Emblem character Marth. He is the lead character of Fire Emblem: The Binding Blade, the son of Eliwood and heir presumptive of Pherae who eventually becomes a major military leader. He has also appeared in other Fire Emblem games. The inclusion of Roy and Marth in Melee is cited as one of the reasons Nintendo started localizing the series for international distribution.

Roy was designed by Eiji Kaneda and voiced by Jun Fukuyama in Japanese and by Ray Chase in English. The designers intended Roy to be a free-spirited character who would appeal to younger players, which they felt contrasted with earlier titles' protagonists. His personality differs from his appearance in Melee, where Super Smash Bros. creator Masahiro Sakurai believed that he was an energetic and internally strong character, only to discover that this was not the case after playing the game.

Roy received negative reception for his appearance in The Binding Blade, with critics noting his poor gameplay attributes. His inclusion in Super Smash Bros. was also criticized due to his similarity to other Fire Emblem characters also included, as well as his similarity to them in terms of gameplay.

== Appearances ==
Roy is the lead character of Fire Emblem: The Binding Blade. The story begins when King Zephiel, ruler of the kingdom of Bern, begins invading neighboring nations, added by the Dark Priestess Idunn. Roy, the son of Pherae's ruling marquess Eliwood, returns home, becoming assigned to defend against Zephiel in his father's place due to illness. Along his quest, he is joined by several allies, including princess Lilina and his retainers, Marcus and Merlinus. He later learns that Idunn was forced to fight to destroy humanity by Zephiel. The player can find legendary weapons and the titular Binding Blade in optional chapters. If all are obtained, Roy is able to defeat Idunn without killing her, freeing her from being under control. The next installment after The Binding Blade, Fire Emblem: The Blazing Blade, is a prequel featuring a younger Eliwood as one of its protagonists. Roy appears during the game's epilogue, where Eliwood reunites with his comrade Hector and their respective children are introduced to each other. Roy is available as a playable character in Fire Emblem Awakening as DLC. Roy also appears in Fire Emblem Heroes. In North American Fire Emblem character popularity polls running up to the release of Fire Emblem Heroes, Roy was ranked the second favorite male character behind Ike . He later appears as an Emblem character in Fire Emblem Engage.

Roy's first video game appearance was in 2001's Super Smash Bros. Melee, where his gameplay was based on Marth's, another Fire Emblem character featured in the game. He is more powerful and slower than Marth. He was later reintroduced into the series as downloadable content (DLC) for Super Smash Bros. for Nintendo 3DS and Wii U after being absent from Super Smash Bros. Brawl. His inclusion in the Wii U and Nintendo 3DS entries was reportedly leaked, alongside Ryu. He also appears as part of the base roster in the series' 2018 entry, Super Smash Bros. Ultimate. To promote his appearance in Super Smash Bros. for Nintendo 3DS and Wii U, an amiibo figure of Roy was featured as an exclusive release at GameStop. In 2019, plushies depicting Roy and other Fire Emblem characters were released.

Roy appears in the Fire Emblem: The Champion's Blade manga, which was first published prior to the release of The Binding Blade and takes place concurrently with the events of the game.

== Concept and design ==
Roy was created for the cancelled Nintendo 64 entry in the Fire Emblem series, which had a long development cycle. He was originally named Ike, and was one of only two characters kept when what became Binding Blade restarted development in 2000, the other being Karel. Roy's character was designed to be free-spirited and emphatic to appeal to younger players and a wider audience, which they believed contrasted earlier titles' protagonists. The renamed Roy was first revealed at Nintendo Space World 2001, where a demo of Binding Blade was being shown. His final design for Binding Blade was created by Eiji Kaneda. At 15, Roy is the youngest Fire Emblem protagonist.

Despite Binding Blade intending to be released first, delays caused his game to release after Super Smash Bros. Melee, which featured Roy as a playable character. When developing Super Smash Bros. Melee, Masahiro Sakurai wanted to include more characters who could cross blades with Link from The Legend of Zelda due to his personal preference for sword-fighting characters and campaigned for Roy's inclusion. He was added as a character based on fellow Fire Emblem protagonist Marth. Sakurai explained that he viewed Roy as an energetic and internally strong character compared to Marth, leading him to designing Roy's sword to do more damage at the base as opposed to Marth's, where more damage was done at the tip. He remarked that, despite his initial impression of Roy from a description of the character, he found that he was nothing like that after playing Binding Blade, exclaiming that his characterization of Roy was not due to a misunderstanding of his character.

Due to the Fire Emblem series being only available in Japan, whether they should be included in the English release of Super Smash Bros. Melee was called into question, with Sakurai noting how unusual it was to have characters speak Japanese in English releases at the time. Sakurai stated that there were difficulties getting Marth to remain in the English version, but he pushed hard for his inclusion due to believing he would be fun. He added that there was more dispute over Roy, with Sakurai discussing removal of him with Nintendo of America, though they stated that he would be fun, so he should remain. Their popularity in Super Smash Bros. Melee led to Nintendo releasing future Fire Emblem games outside of Japan. The first of these was Fire Emblem: The Blazing Blade, which has a younger Roy designed by Sachiko Wada.

Roy is voiced in Japanese by Jun Fukuyama, three years after Fukuyama's voice acting debut. Sakurai noted that his vocal performance had changed slightly from Super Smash Bros. Melee to his recording session for Super Smash Bros. for Nintendo 3DS and Wii U, with him having more difficulty doing higher-pitched sounds.

== Reception ==
Roy's appearance in Melee alongside Marth brought further exposure to the Fire Emblem series outside of Japan, and was cited as a reason Nintendo began to localize and release Fire Emblem games internationally, beginning with the seventh title in the series. Due to popular demand from Japanese fans, Roy was added in Super Smash Bros. for Nintendo 3DS and Wii U as a DLC character. Chris Carter from Destructoid welcomed Nintendo's decision to reintroduce Roy and considered him his "personal favorite", although he found that the character played quite differently in Super Smash Bros. for Nintendo 3DS and Wii U compared to his previous iteration in Melee or to other Fire Emblem characters. Lucas M. Thomas from IGN felt his moveset in Melee was too similar to Marth's, preferring Ike replacing him in Super Smash Bros. Brawl. Roy was criticized alongside other Fire Emblem characters in the Super Smash Bros. series by Kotaku writer Cecilia D'Anastasio along Lucina, Marth and Chrom, mainly due to D'Anastasio believing they all fit the same sword fighter archetype. Die Hard Game Fan writer Aileen Coe stated that, with the release of Fire Emblem: Blazing Sword, fans of Marth and Roy in Super Smash Bros. were confused by their absence, assuming that the character Eliwood was Roy.

Roy was the subject of criticism for his low strength in Binding Blade, with Hardcore Gaming 101 writer Kurt Kalata feeling that all of his popularity was from Super Smash Bros. Melee due to his lack of appearances and his comparative weakness to characters like Ike, Hector, and Sigurd. Real Sound writer Kensuke Sakata noted that he had poor growth rates for his stats, including strength and speed, causing him to be used less, especially during the middle of the game where enemies and allies grow more powerful. Mike Moehnke of RPGamer criticized his weak in-game attributes for the majority of the game, feeling that this detracted from an otherwise satisfactory gameplay experience. Fellow RPGamer writer Sam Wachter felt that his late promotion in the game was a contributing factor to his issues. Other critics agreed, with Marianne Penn of TheGamer calling him among the series' weakest and felt that was a contrast to his role in the Super Smash Bros. series. Despite these gameplay criticisms, Penn felt that Roy is a decent character in terms of personality, and that his popularity is "rightfully warranted" in spite of his glaring flaws.
