= Fire Emblem: The Blazing Blade =

2003 video game

- North American cover art featuring the three main protagonists. From left to right: Eliwood, Lyn, and Hector.
- Developer: Intelligent Systems
- Publisher: Nintendo
- Directors: Taeko Kaneda; Kentarou Nishimura
- Producers: Toru Narihiro; Takehiro Izushi
- Programmers: Makoto Katayama; Susumu Ishihara
- Artists: Sachiko Wada; Masahiro Higuchi; Daisuke Izuka
- Writers: Ken Yokoyama; Kouhei Maeda
- Composers: Yuka Tsujiyoko; Saki Haruyama
- Series: Fire Emblem
- Platform: Game Boy Advance
- Release: JP: April 25, 2003; NA: November 3, 2003; AU: February 20, 2004; EU: July 16, 2004
- Genre: Tactical role-playing
- Modes: Single-player, multiplayer

Fire Emblem: The Blazing Blade, (Note: Known in Japan as Fire Emblem: Rekka no Ken (Japanese: ファイアーエムブレム 烈火の剣, Hepburn: Faiā Emuburemu: Rekka no Ken; lit. Fire Emblem: The Sword of Flame or The Blazing Blade)) also known simply as Fire Emblem, is a 2003 tactical role-playing game developed by Intelligent Systems and published by Nintendo for the Game Boy Advance. It is the seventh installment in the Fire Emblem series, (Note: Sources disagree on the exact numbering: it is variously called the 7th, and 8th entry in the series.) the second to be released for the platform after Fire Emblem: The Binding Blade, and the first to be localized for international audiences. It was released in Japan and North America in 2003, and in Europe and Australia in 2004.

The game is a prequel to The Binding Blade, set on the fictional continent of Elibe. It tells the story of Lyn, Eliwood, and Hector, three young lords who band together on a journey to find Eliwood's missing father, Elbert, while thwarting a larger conspiracy threatening the stability of Elibe. The gameplay, which draws from earlier Fire Emblem entries, features tactical combat between armies on a grid-based map. Characters are assigned different character classes that affect abilities and are subjected to permanent death if defeated in battle.

Development began in 2002 as a companion title to The Binding Blade, but it was prolonged from its initial seven-month window as new features were added. While the Fire Emblem series remained exclusive to Japan due to concerns about its difficulty, the success of Advance Wars and popular demand following the inclusion of Marth and Roy in Super Smash Bros. Melee prompted the game's localization. The game was released to international critical acclaim and commercial success. Critics praised the game for its graphics, gameplay, characters, and story, and it established the Fire Emblem series in Western markets; its overseas success caused all subsequent games (except for Fire Emblem: New Mystery of the Emblem) to be released outside of Japan.

== Gameplay ==
Two characters on the combat screen in Fire Emblem: a cavalier attacks a brigand. Displayed are the respective characters' names, health, and battle statistics (hit rate, damage, and critical rate from top to bottom).

Fire Emblem is a tactical role-playing game in which players take the role of story protagonists Lyn, Eliwood, and Hector as they navigate story-driven missions across the fictional continent of Elibe. The player takes on the role of a mostly unseen tactician directing their army. The single-player campaign is divided into chapters which generally begin with story elements presented through the use of scenes animated with still images of the main characters, then followed by a battle with an enemy; after each battle, the player is allowed to save their progress. In-game currency is gained either through battles in the game's various arenas or through other means, rather than from defeating units. Currency can be used to buy new items and weapons from merchants at specific locations within maps. Items can also be exchanged between units before and during battles.

Battles in the main plotline occur on maps organized into square grids. Battle actions are governed by a turn-based system in which every unit on both sides is allotted a chance to move and act. During gameplay, weather and terrain effects appear, such as fog of war or other environmental elements that can be manipulated to any side's advantage, affecting the progress of battle. Units are split among player, enemy and allied non-player character (NPC) factions. Each unit's movement, range, and attack range are displayed when selected. The player must clear a map or achieve specified conditions to advance the campaign: these objectives vary between defeating all enemies (or just their leader), defending positions for some time, capturing strongholds, or rescuing/defending NPCs. When engaging a targeted unit with the player's selected unit, the battle map scene transitions into an aiding transaction or direct combat between the player's current unit and their target, depending on whether that target is friend/ally or foe, respectively, with animations playing out appropriately. When hit with an attack, a character loses health points (HP). For player characters, HP can be restored with items or by units with healing magic; it can also be regained by standing in forts, gates or castles, or using a special spell that replenishes health based on damage dealt to an enemy.

Each unit is governed by a character class system that determines their types of actions, and what weapons and tools they can use. A unit will gain experience points (EXP) after each action in combat. Units level up upon reaching 100 EXP and their attributes, such as attack power and defense, are randomly improved, while their weapon ranks naturally increase when using associated weapon types. Upon reaching Level 10 and using a special item, a unit's class can be upgraded to a more powerful version with access to new items and weapons. If a unit is defeated in battle, they are subject to permanent death, thus removed from all future encounters and the overall storyline (with a few exceptions for some characters at certain points). If the main characters (Lyn, Eliwood, or Hector) or others of critical importance should fall, then the game ends, and the player must restart their current level.

Weapon strengths and weaknesses are governed by the series' Weapons Triangle system; axes are strong against lances, lances are strong against swords, and swords are strong against axes. Bows are independent of the system, being effective against airborne units. A similar system, dubbed the Magic Trinity in-game, governs how different types of spells react; elemental magic (anima) is strong against light, light against dark, and dark against elemental (anima). The strength of weapon types assigned to a particular unit is raised through usage, with its rank ranging from E to S, with S being the greatest possible affinity with a promoted character. Characters also have a Support system, where talking in battle strengthens two characters' relationship, and consequently provides stat boosts. The greater the Support rank, which ranges from "C" to "A", the better the boost.

Outside of the main campaign, players can battle against the game's artificial intelligence (AI) in the Link Arena: after building a team, the player fights a battle against their own units controlled by the game AI. Fire Emblem also features a Link Arena multiplayer option in which up to four players can link up and do battle with teams of characters from the single-player save file. Players choose up to five characters and equip them like in the main campaign. During battle, each player takes turns to attack with one character unit. Weapons are selected automatically for each battle. Victory is determined by either surviving for a period of time or accumulating the most points.

== Synopsis ==
Several characters from the game; left to right, Eliwood, Sain, Dorcas, Lyn, Rebecca, Hector, and Serra

The events of Fire Emblem take place on the fictional continent of Elibe, 20 years before the events of Fire Emblem: The Binding Blade. In ancient times, dragons lived in peace with humans, but were later banished in a devastating war: the Scouring. Throughout the game, the player travels through the countries of Sacae, a land of nomads and tribes; Lycia, an alliance of marquisates including Pherae and Ostia; and Bern, a militaristic kingdom ruled by a single ruler.

The player assumes the role of a tactician discovered by Lyn, a Sacean girl who was left the last of her tribe after a surprise bandit attack a few years prior. Lyn learns from a pair of knights named Sain and Kent that she is actually Lady Lyndis, and her mother was the estranged daughter of the Marquess of Caelin, Hausen, who seeks to reconcile with his daughter's family. She begins a journey to Caelin to reunite with her grandfather, obtaining the sacred sword Mani Katti soon after, but comes under attack from Hausen's avaricious younger brother Lundgren, who wants to kill both her and Hausen to seize power in Caelin. During her quest, Lyn protects Nils, a traveling bard, from the guild of assassins known as the Black Fang, while his sister Ninian is rescued by Lord Eliwood, son of Marquess Elbert of Pherae. Finally defeating Lundgren, Lyn reunites with her grandfather.

One year later, Elbert disappears, prompting Eliwood and his friend Lord Hector, younger brother of Marquess Uther of Ostia, to investigate. The pair discovers that the Black Fang has incited Marquess Darin of Laus to rebel against Lycia, and Elbert was captured when he refused to cooperate. After rescuing Lyn from Darin's troops, the three pursue him to the Dread Isle. There, they reunite with Ninian and Nils and learn that the Black Fang is being manipulated by Nergal, a dark sorcerer who seeks to provoke all-out war in Elibe, providing him with an enormous amount of "quintessence", or life-force, from fallen warriors. By forcing the siblings to open the Dragon's Gate, he can summon dragons to Elibe. The party kills Darin, but Elbert dies delivering a grave wound to Nergal. The party returns to Ostia to report recent events to Uther, who directs them to the western desert of Nabata. There, they meet Archsage Athos, who sends them to Bern to find the Shrine of Seals. In Bern, the heroes save Prince Zephiel from an assassination attempt orchestrated by his jealous father, King Desmond. Out of gratitude, the queen of Bern gives them directions to the Shrine of Seals. At the Shrine, the party meets the ancient hero Bramimond, who unseals the Blazing Blade Durandal and the Thunder Axe Armads so they can oppose Nergal. However, Nergal returns and captures Ninian. The heroes collect the legendary weapons, but Nergal tricks Eliwood into killing Ninian, who, along with Nils, is revealed to be a half-dragon. The group returns to Ostia, where Hector learns that Uther has died of an illness. The party and Athos return to the Dread Isle and defeat Nergal, who summons three dragons with the last of his strength. Bramimond arrives and resurrects Ninian, who banishes two of the dragons; the heroes slay the last dragon in battle.

In the aftermath, Athos expends the last of his energy and predicts a future conflict originating in Bern before dying; Bramimond also passes, having used the last of his power to resurrect Ninian. Nils returns through the Dragon's Gate and seals it, while Ninian follows him, or, if she has fallen in love with Eliwood, chooses to remain in Elibe as his wife despite a far shorter lifespan. Eliwood becomes the Marquess of Pherae, while Hector inherits his elder brother's title as Marquess of Ostia, and Lyn (if she does not marry Hector or Eliwood) abdicates her claim over Caelin and returns to Sacae. Fifteen years later, Eliwood and Hector reunite, introduce their respective children Roy and Lilina to each other, and discuss the recent assassination of Desmond. Meanwhile, the embittered Zephiel is confronted by a robed man (Jahn) who accuses him of awakening a demon dragon, a prelude to the events of Fire Emblem: The Binding Blade.

== Development ==
Fire Emblem, known in Japan as Fire Emblem: Rekka no Ken, was created by series developer Intelligent Systems. Toru Narihiro and Takehiro Izushi from Intelligent Systems acted as producers, Hitoshi Yamagami from Nintendo supervised with Taeko Kaneda and Kentarou Nishimura as directors. The script was written by Ken Yokoyama and Kouhei Maeda. Character designs were done by Sachiko Wada, who would reprise her role for Fire Emblem: The Sacred Stones. A second artist on the project was Ryo Hirata, who had previously done illustration work for Production I.G and would go on to work on The Sacred Stones. Eiji Kaneda, who worked on The Binding Blade, did uncredited illustration work. Background graphics, particularly those for the Fire Dragons, were done by Daisuke Izuka. Music was composed by Yuka Tsujiyoko, who had worked on every game since the series' inception, although Fire Emblem would be her last work on the series as a composer. She was helped by Saki Haruyama.

Development of Fire Emblem began in 2002 after the release of The Binding Blade. Intended as a companion title built upon the foundation of The Binding Blade, development time was initially estimated at seven months. The storyline was built around three main characters; Lyn's story acts as an introduction to the gameplay, Eliwood's story is the bulk of the main plot, and Hector's story is an alternate perspective of the main plot with steeper gameplay challenges. As with The Binding Blade, the titular "Fire Emblem" was represented as a family crest. The gameplay, initially identical to The Binding Blade, underwent multiple changes including expansions on the role of the player in the storyline through the unseen strategist character, and the added tutorial stages helped introduce the mechanics to new players. Due to the multiple extra features, development ultimately lasted over a year. The tutorial was included because the game's steep difficulty was proving off-putting to new players; an inclusion made to make Fire Emblem a major series for Nintendo. Additional items and music could be unlocked in Japan via "Monthly Nintendo" demo kiosks, and in North America by connecting the game to the Mario Kart: Double Dash!! Bonus Disc via a GameCube – Game Boy Advance link cable.

== Release ==
Fire Emblem was first announced in early 2003. It was the second title in the Fire Emblem series to have been developed for the Game Boy Advance while also being compatible with the newly released Game Boy Advance SP, an upgraded version of the GBA. It was released on April 25, 2003. Prior to 2017, the game's Japanese subtitle was translated as The Sword of Flame. In 2017, the subtitle was officially translated by Nintendo as The Blazing Blade. The game was later released on the Virtual Console for Wii U on May 14, 2014, and was released for the Nintendo Switch as part of the Nintendo Classics service on June 23, 2023.

=== Localization ===
The concept of localizing a Fire Emblem game in the West had been around for some time, but the combined elements of extensive use of text and a view that tactical RPGs would be met with low sales overseas had kept the series exclusive to Japan. Another major factor was the appearance of Roy from The Binding Blade and Marth from the first Fire Emblem in the 2001 fighting game Super Smash Bros. Melee. The director of Melee, Masahiro Sakurai, had wanted to include Marth since the original Super Smash Bros., and included him as part of a push for more sword-wielding characters. Gameplay-wise, Roy was included to act as a clone of Marth, and his inclusion was partially to advertise the upcoming release of Binding Blade in Japan (three months after the release of Melee). There were difficulties including both Marth and Roy, as the Fire Emblem series had not seen an overseas release at that point. Sakurai, with support from Nintendo of America, managed to keep Marth and Roy in the game. The growing base of tactical role-playing games including Advance Wars, in addition to the interest garnered by the appearance of Roy and Marth in Melee, meant Nintendo was more willing to bring Fire Emblem overseas. Speaking in a later interview, localization producer Tim O'Leary said that localizing the title was more difficult than its successor The Sacred Stones, but was smaller in scale than Fire Emblem: Path of Radiance.

A Western release was first hinted at in mid-2003, when it was listed on a leaked release list from Nintendo of America. It was first shown at the 2003 Electronic Entertainment Expo, along with a playable demo. For its Western release, the subtitle was removed, with it simply being dubbed "Fire Emblem". The game released in North America on November 3, 2003; in Australia on February 20, 2004; and in Europe on July 16. It was later re-released on Virtual Console for Wii U on August 21, 2014, in Europe; and in North America on December 4 of that year.

== Reception ==
Reception

Aggregate score
Aggregator	Score
Metacritic	88/100 (31 reviews)

Review scores
Publication	Score
Eurogamer	9/10
Famitsu	34/40
GamePro	4.5/5
GameSpot	8.9/10
GameSpy	4/5
IGN	9.5/10
PALGN	9/10

Fire Emblem met with generally positive reviews from critics. On aggregate site Metacritic, Fire Emblem garnered a score of 88/100 based on 31 reviews. It was the 6th best-reviewed GBA title of 2003.

Japanese magazine Famitsu praised the characters and felt it was a suitable addition to the Fire Emblem series, while Eurogamer's Tom Bramwell cited the storyline as being similar to better examples within the Japanese role-playing genre and its near-seamless integration with gameplay mechanics. GamePro reviewer Star Dingo called the narrative "a complex (but not convoluted) classic fantasy yarn", while GameSpot's Bethany Massimilla called the story standard while praising the writing and character development. Christian Nutt of GameSpy praised the writing as highly enjoyable for both the Japanese and Western releases, and IGN's Craig Harris believed that the game was superior to Advance Wars through its portrayal of characters despite some minor complaints about characters that remained alive for story reasons despite falling in battle. PALGN reviewer Andrew Burns commented that the story gained a serious edge once Lyn's opening story arc was completed.

Speaking about the gameplay, Famitsu was slightly mixed about some aspects; one critic praised the added tutorial for allowing new players to ease into the series gameplay, while another compared the tutorial to a nagging mother and said it and the unseen Tactician representing the player might grate with series fans. Bramwell praised the integration of RPG elements and tactical gameplay, in addition to finding the permanent death of characters a suitable fit for the game's world. Dingo was positive about the level design and controls, but warned that it was quite short and lacking in depth when compared to Final Fantasy Tactics Advance. Massimilla found the gameplay both accessible and challenging as she made her way through the game, while Nutt was skeptical about the permanent death system and critical of the in-game economy despite generally enjoying the experience. Harris again compared it to Advance Wars, but said that Fire Emblem had enough unique elements to make it its own product, and generally praised the title's accomplishments. Burns, who had experience of earlier Fire Emblem titles, praised the game as a worthy entry in the series and a good entry for the West to experience.

=== Sales ===
In its debut week, Rekka no Ken entered Japanese gaming charts at #2 with sales of 93,880 units. The following week it had dropped to #4, selling a further 47,550 and bringing total sales to 141,430 units. The following week it had reached #3 with further sales of 23,296 units. The game continued to steadily into July, reaching #21 in the top 100 best-selling games for that half of 2003 with total sales of 223,575 units. As of 2012, Rekka no Ken has sold 272,000 units in Japan. While no exact sales figure are available for Western territories, developers later stated that Fire Emblem was a commercial success overseas, and prompted the development of Path of Radiance for the GameCube home console.

=== Accolades ===
Fire Emblem was named "Editor's Choice" by both IGN and GameSpy as part of their reviews. During the 7th Annual Interactive Achievement Awards, the Academy of Interactive Arts & Sciences nominated Fire Emblem for "Handheld Game of the Year". In the same year, the International Game Developers Association awarded the game for "Excellence in Writing" alongside titles including Beyond Good & Evil and Star Wars: Knights of the Old Republic. In lists compiled by IGN, GamesRadar and Game Informer, Fire Emblem was ranked among the best games for the GBA.
