= Fire Emblem: The Binding Blade =

2002 video game

- Developer: Intelligent Systems
- Publisher: Nintendo
- Directors: Tōru Narihiro; Masayuki Horikawa
- Producer: Takehiro Izushi
- Designer: Masayuki Horikawa
- Programmer: Takafumi Kaneko
- Artists: Taeko Kaneda; Masahiro Higuchi; Sachiko Wada; Eiji Kaneda
- Writers: Masayuki Horikawa; Kouhei Maeda
- Composer: Yuka Tsujiyoko
- Series: Fire Emblem
- Platform: Game Boy Advance
- Release: JP: March 29, 2002
- Genre: Tactical role-playing
- Mode: Single-player

Fire Emblem: The Binding Blade (Note: Known in Japan as Fire Emblem: Fūin no Tsurugi (Japanese: ファイアーエムブレム封印の剣, Hepburn: Faiā Emuburemu: Fūin no Tsurugi; alternatively translated as The Sword of Seals)) is a 2002 tactical role-playing game developed by Intelligent Systems and published by Nintendo for the Game Boy Advance (GBA). It is the sixth mainline entry in the Fire Emblem series, (Note: Sources disagree on the exact numbering: it is variously called the 6th and 7th entry in the series.) the first title produced for the system, and the first title to appear on a handheld console.

The Binding Blade is set on the fictional continent of Elibe, which has been dominated by humans for centuries following an ancient war between humanity and dragons. The story follows Roy, a young nobleman from the small independent nation of Pherae as he leads a growing army against the forces of King Zephiel of the kingdom of Bern, who is gradually taking over Elibe with the aid of a mysterious power. As with other Fire Emblem games, battles take place on a grid-based map, with player units assigned character classes taking part in single combat with enemies and being subject to permanent death if defeated.

The Binding Blade began development as a Nintendo 64 title called Fire Emblem: Maiden of Darkness, but internal changes caused the project to change its platform to the GBA, scrapping nearly all of its original content in the process. One of Intelligent Systems' main goals was to make the game more forgiving to newcomers than the notoriously difficult Fire Emblem: Thracia 776. Upon release, it was praised by critics and sold over 345,000 units. Despite never releasing overseas, Roy's appearance in Super Smash Bros. Melee contributed to the localization of its 2003 prequel, The Blazing Blade, released overseas as Fire Emblem.

== Gameplay ==
A battle between Lance (player unit, right) and an enemy Soldier (left) in The Binding Blade

Fire Emblem: The Binding Blade is a tactical role-playing game in which players control main protagonist Roy and his growing army as they take part in battle across the land of Elibe. Gameplay is broken up into maps bookended by story sequences, with the completion of each map advancing the storyline. When the game is completed for the first time, a new difficulty level - Hard Mode - is unlocked.

Battles take place on grid-based self-contained maps and are governed by a turn-based system where units on both sides are given their chance to move and act. Once a unit has moved, depending on their position relative to allied units and enemies, they may perform actions such as attacking or supporting allied characters through statistic-enhancing abilities, or they can wait until the next turn. When attacking, the game transitions from the top-down view of the map to a side-view battlefield, where a cinematic battle plays between the player and enemy units. Each unit has access to different weapons and items, but these will break after a number of uses and must be repaired in between missions. The effectiveness of melee weapons is dictated with the series' recurring Weapons Triangle mechanic: axes are strong against lances, lances are strong against swords, and swords are strong against axes. Villages found during map battles will be attacked; if defended by the player, non-player characters within the village will give hints about future objectives or provide a reward. A map is cleared when the boss is defeated and Roy seizes the boss's location. If characters fall in battle, they are subjected to permanent death, removing them from the rest of the game. If Roy dies, the game ends and the map must be restarted.

Each unit has their own character class, with that class determining a unit's range of movement, weapon, and strengths and weaknesses. Classes range from on-foot units like swordsmen and knights, mounted units such as the series' recurring Pegasus Knights, and magic-wielding units such as Mages. Each class also has its own battle animation. Upon performing an action in battle, characters are awarded experience points (EXP). Upon gathering enough EXP, the character levels up, and their statistics such as attack, defense, and maximum hit points are raised randomly. Using special items, a unit can be promoted into an Advanced Class, changing their class and increasing their statistics. A Support system exists where characters who remain next to each other for a number of turns talk to each other, gaining Support Points and earning stat boosts. A limit is placed on the number of Support Points that can be earned when completing a single map.

== Synopsis ==
The Binding Blade is set on the continent of Elibe, a setting shared with its pre-sequel Fire Emblem. Elibe was engulfed a thousand years before in a conflict between humanity and dragons called the Scouring: begun by humanity, the dragons were defeated and banished from the world. Victory was achieved using the eight Divine Weapons, which were subsequently scattered across Elibe. The story begins when King Zephiel, ruler of the kingdom of Bern, finishes the brutal conquest of Ilia and Sacae and sets his sights on Lycia. In a small region called Pherae, Roy, the son of Pherae's ruling marquess Eliwood, is forced to return home when Bern begins its invasion. As Eliwood is unable to battle due to illness, Roy is assigned command of Lycia's army. Roy leads his forces to Ostia, another region of Lycia ruled by Eliwood's friend Hector and his daughter Lilina. He is unable to save Hector from death, but rescues Lilina from Bern's occupation and sees to the protection of Guinivere, Zephiel's sister who opposes his war and has fled Bern with its royal treasure, the Fire Emblem. They also discover a small cave on the outskirts of Ostia where they obtain a Divine Weapon, Durandal. Over the course of the journey, Roy and the Lycian Army locate six other Divine Weapons, although the player must fulfill certain objectives on each map to obtain them.

The kingdom of Etruria contacts Roy and assigns his army to travel to the Western Isles, where heavy bandit activity is being reported. Though the Lycian Army repels the bandits, they discover from either a royal-in-hiding named Elffin or a dancer Larum that Etruria's nobility have allied with Bern and are enslaving the people on the Western Isles to work the mines. They also learn that Bern has recruited Manaketes, powerful dragons who hide their might in human forms. To learn more about them, the Lycian Army travels to Arcadia, a city hidden in a vast desert where humans and dragons live in peace, and gain stronger insight from the elders. A child Manakete named Fae also befriends Roy during his stay and tags along with him. Roy and his forces later return to Etruria and remove the corrupt nobility, allowing the kingdom's rightful rulers to restore order and the Lycian Army to merge with Etruria's. Depending on the player's actions (Note: After Chapter 16 or 16x, the game checks the experience of the player's units; if Shannaシャニー (Thany) and Theaティト (Thite) have gained more experience than Sueスー (Sue) and Sinシン (Sin), then the player will take the Ilian route; otherwise, the player will take the Sacae route.), the newly reformed Etrurian Army then continues through either the snowy tundras of Ilia and its many mercenary groups on Bern's contract, or through the plains of Sacae where nomad tribes have allied with Bern.

Roy beseeches Guinevere to tell him the reason why Zephiel started this war. Guinevere reveals that Zephiel's and her father, King Desmond, was envious of Zephiel's natural ability and charisma. She tells Roy that King Desmond, under the guise of a reconciliatory gesture, poisoned Zephiel's chalice. Zephiel was nursed back to health by his guard, General Murdoch, and faked his own death. When King Desmond stood over Zephiel's open casket during his funeral, Zephiel sprang up, and impaled King Desmond with a sword he had concealed in his coffin. Guinevere tells Roy that King Desmond's betrayal caused her brother to become bitter, and led to his decision to resurrect the dragons in order to return the world to them.

The Etrurian Army attacks Bern's borders and defeats Murdoch. Afterwards, Roy discovers a shrine housing the Binding Blade, a powerful weapon that rules over the other eight Divine Weapons. Combined with the Fire Emblem, Roy is granted its incredible power and wields the Binding Blade in the final assault on Bern's capital. Zephiel is eventually killed by the Etrurian Army and his Divine Weapon is taken from him. If the player has not collected the eight Divine Weapons, the game ends prematurely at this point. If the player has collected them and they are unbroken, Roy learns that Zephiel ordered his remaining forces to gather elsewhere in Elibe and continue his plans. The Divine Weapons suddenly emit a light that leads the Etrurian Army to this location: an ancient temple that had long ago been built by the dragons.

Once inside, Roy is shown the true history of the Scouring. The dragons, despite their power, were unable to maintain their numbers due to how slowly they reproduced compared to humans. As the war came to a close, the surviving Fire Dragons captured a Divine Dragon named Idunn and sealed away her soul. Enslaved to their will, Idunn reproduced dragons at an incredible rate and became known as the Demon Dragon, but she was defeated by a warrior wielding the Binding Blade. Her power was locked away until Zephiel, blinded by a deep misanthropy towards humanity, released her out of his insane desire to return Elibe to the dragons. As she has no emotion or free will, Idunn continues to follow Zephiel's orders even after his death and threatens to raise a dragon army that will destroy everything on the continent. On the topmost floor of the temple, the Etrurian Army battles and defeats Idunn and her endlessly spawning dragons. In the war's wake, Elibe begins to rebuild itself. Guinivere is named the new ruler of Bern, while Elffin returns to Etruria after his long absence. Roy and Lilina, assuming the latter is still alive, become the new marquesses of Pherae and Ostia respectively. If Roy delivered the final blow on Idunn with the Binding Blade and if Fae is still alive, Idunn survives and is taken to Arcadia to live with Fae while her soul slowly returns to her.

== Development ==
The Binding Blade was developed by Intelligent Systems. It was directed by Tōru Narihiro, and produced by Takehiro Izushi. The designer was Masayuki Horikawa, while programming was handled by Takafumi Kaneko. The scenario was written by Masayuki Horikawa and series newcomer Kouhei Maeda. The character designs were handled by Eiji Kaneda. The music was composed by Yuka Tsujiyoko, who had worked on every title in the series up to that point. The Binding Blade began development as Fire Emblem: Maiden of Darkness, a Fire Emblem title intended for the Nintendo 64 and its peripheral 64DD. This version was revealed in 1997 by Shigeru Miyamoto under the working title Fire Emblem 64. When they were well into the development of Maiden of Darkness, the internal development structure at Intelligent Systems was changed, which combined with the poor sales of the 64DD resulted in the game's development being restarted in 2000 for the Game Boy Advance (GBA). Very little of the original Nintendo 64 game concept survived the transition. Aside from the characters Roy and Karel, most of the original game's characters were scrapped. The subtitle Maiden of Darkness remained in use as a working title up until 2001, when it became The Binding Blade. Production on the final version of The Binding Blade took approximately one year.

The game was the first title in the Fire Emblem series on a portable console. While development of a handheld Fire Emblem title had been considered for earlier games, the team felt available hardware lacked the expression to realize their vision. The GBA offered technical capacities superior to the Super Famicom, the release platform of the last Fire Emblem title Thracia 776, while also offering portability, making it more appealing to players. The platform was also chosen due to estimated development time and budget considerations. Developing for the new hardware proved challenging in some respects, and easy in others such as creating basic software. During development, two different versions were developed while the team were getting used to the new hardware. One of the main issues they faced was the limited resolution and screen size of the GBA. The game's combat animations were intended to evoke scenes from high fantasy, such as Record of Lodoss War and Slayers, contrasting with the equivalent styles of fantasy fighting in Japanese stories.

Compared to earlier titles in the series, the story for The Binding Blade was made deliberately simple, with clear heroes and villains, and an obvious objective for the player to complete. It was the first time the Fire Emblem series employed a branching narrative, with different characters opening up different story routes. The titular "Fire Emblem" is represented as a family crest. The character of Roy was designed to appeal to younger players, and was also given a strong character in contrast to earlier recent titles. He was also made to be a free-spirited and emphatic character so he appealed to as wide an audience as possible. Also in contrast to earlier entries, particularly the notoriously difficult Thracia 776, the difficulty of The Binding Blade was intentionally lowered: the game was initially planned with three difficulties, with the final "Normal" mode being intended as "Easy" mode. Another new element included was counters for elements such as turn numbers.

== Release ==
The Binding Blade was officially announced at Space World 2000 under its original title Maiden of Darkness, as one of the early titles for the GBA. According to later comments from the staff, the game's official title was already under consideration at the time. The game was announced under its official title at the 2001 Space World event. To promote the game in Japan, a live action television commercial was created: standard 30 second versions mixed gameplay footage with the live action sequence, while the 40 second director's cut featured the full commercial without gameplay. The latter version was only available through the game's official website. The commercial was based upon the operatic commercial created for the first Fire Emblem title Shadow Dragon and the Blade of Light. The game released in Japan on March 29, 2002. The game's Japanese title, Fūin no Tsurugi, has been alternately translated as The Binding Blade and The Sword of Seals. The Binding Blade became the more common modern translation, and in 2017 it was used by Nintendo when detailing Roy's series origins for his character profile on the website for Fire Emblem Heroes. The game was later re-released in Japan on Virtual Console for Wii U on September 2, 2015, and on the Nintendo Classics service on June 23, 2023.

== Reception ==
Reception

Review scores
Publication	Score
Famitsu	9/10, 9/10, 8/10, 10/10
Jeuxvideo.com	17/20
RPGamer	3.5/5
RPGFan	87%

During its debut week in Japan, The Binding Blade reached #4 in the sales charts, with over 101,000 units. It was still in the charts in May, having dropped to #17 and reached total sales of over 220,000 units. By the end of 2002 the game sold over 345,000 units, ranking at #29 in the 300 best-selling video games of the year.

Famitsu was positive about the game. One reviewer noted the slight alterations to the series formula with the shift onto the GBA, but said that it was still unmistakably a Fire Emblem title. A second reviewer praised the game's pacing and the eased difficulty of missions allowed by the "rescue" function. A third reviewer praised the drop in difficulty from Thracia 776 despite preserving some challenge, and positively noted the fast reactions of the game AI, enabling a low-stress experience for players.

RPGFan's Woojin Lee praised the game's animation as some of the best on the system, positively noted the added features when compared to earlier entries in the series, and actively praised the game's ability to attach players to characters and the resultant impact when those characters were felled in battle. In concluding his review, he said: "While I'm not sure if the average American gamer is up to the challenge that playing an unforgiving game like [The Binding Blade], I think everyone who tries the game will be pleasantly surprised by how deep and engrossing it is".

Mike Moehnke of RPGamer, writing a retrospective review for the site, praised the game's tactical gameplay and the difficulty being noticeable without being overwhelming. He also positively noted the links to its 2003 prequel Rekka no Ken. His main criticisms of the title were intuitive item management between battles, an underdeveloped and restrictive Support system, and the fact that Roy was a very weak character for the majority of the game. He also negatively noted its continued exclusivity to Japan, although he noted that fan translations were readily available. He concluded by saying that The Binding Blade was "not the best game in the series, but neither [was] it the worst".

== Legacy ==
The Binding Blade would have a profound effect upon subsequent entries in the series. Main protagonist Roy, together with Marth from Shadow Dragon and the Blade of Light and its sequels, was included in Super Smash Bros. Melee for the GameCube: the characters were not removed for the Western release, giving audiences their first wider look at the Fire Emblem series through the characters. Combined with the positive reception and sales of Advance Wars, which altered Nintendo's view that tactical role-playing games would be unsuccessful in the West, this resulted in the next Fire Emblem title being localized. This game, titled Fire Emblem: The Blazing Blade, is a prequel to The Binding Blade set twenty years prior and following Roy's father Eliwood. While Nintendo of America was willing to localize The Binding Blade, the workload of localizing Fire Emblem: The Sacred Stones meant that the idea needed to be scrapped, leaving The Binding Blade exclusive to Japan. All subsequent Fire Emblem titles to date, except Fire Emblem: New Mystery of the Emblem for the Nintendo DS in 2010, have been released overseas.
