= Fire Emblem: Shadow Dragon =

2008 tactical role-playing game

- European packaging artwork
- Developer: Intelligent Systems (Note: Additional graphic development by Alvion)
- Publisher: Nintendo
- Directors: Masayuki Horikawa; Masaki Tawara
- Producers: Toru Narihiro; Hitoshi Yamagami
- Programmers: Yuji Ohashi; Takafumi Kaneko
- Artists: Masamune Shirow; Daisuke Izuka; Masahiro Higuchi
- Writers: Koji Kawasaki; Toshiyuki Kusakihara; Kouhei Maeda
- Composers: Yuka Tsujiyoko; Saki Kasuga
- Series: Fire Emblem
- Platform: Nintendo DS
- Release: JP: August 7, 2008; EU: December 5, 2008; NA: February 16, 2009; AU: February 26, 2009
- Genre: Tactical role-playing
- Modes: Single-player, multiplayer

Fire Emblem: Shadow Dragon (Note: Known in Japan as Fire Emblem: Shin Ankoku Ryū to Hikari no Ken (Japanese: ファイアーエムブレム 新・暗黒竜と光の剣, Hepburn: Faiā Emuburemu: Shin Ankoku Ryū to Hikari no Ken; lit. Fire Emblem: New Dark Dragon and the Sword of Light)) is a tactical role-playing video game developed by Intelligent Systems and published by Nintendo for the Nintendo DS. It is the eleventh installment in the Fire Emblem series (Note: Sources disagree on the exact numbering: it is variously called the eleventh and twelfth installment in the series.) and a remake of the Famicom title Fire Emblem: Shadow Dragon and the Blade of Light, the first entry in the series. It released in 2008 in Japan and Europe, and 2009 in North America and Australia.

Shadow Dragon retells and expands on the events of Shadow Dragon and the Blade of Light. Set on the continent of Archanea, the story follows the tale of Marth, prince of the kingdom of Altea, who is sent on a quest to reclaim his throne after being forced into exile by the evil sorcerer Gharnef and his dark master Medeus, the titular Shadow Dragon. Forming new alliances with neighboring kingdoms, Marth must gather a new army to help him retrieve the sacred sword Falchion and the Fire Emblem shield in order to defeat Gharnef and Medeus and save his kingdom. The gameplay follows the established Fire Emblem formula of turn-based battles played out on grid-based maps. Returning features include a character class system which evolves based on character usage, and permanent death for units defeated in battle.

Development began in 2007, overlapping with the final months of production on Fire Emblem: Radiant Dawn. Many staff from earlier entries returned, including director Tohru Narihiro and original composer Yuka Tsujiyoko, who handled the remixed and expanded soundtrack with Saki Kasuga. Character artwork was redrawn by character designer Daisuke Izuka, with special contributions by Masamune Shirow. First announced in late 2007, it was released internationally the following year and localized by external company 8-4. The game features many gameplay additions and alterations to the original Famicom version, including colored tiles for movement and attack range, the Weapon Triangle, a new class swap feature, and online multiplayer, a first for the franchise. Upon release, critical reception was generally positive, with common points of praise going to the gameplay balance and multiplayer functionality. However, sales remained low for a good while after launch, despite Intelligent Systems saying they were satisfied with the game's sales in Japan.

== Gameplay ==
A battle in Shadow Dragon: two units engage in a battle during the player's turn.

Fire Emblem: Shadow Dragon is a tactical role-playing game where players take control of main protagonist Marth and his army on missions across the continent of Archanea. The gameplay and general game information is separated between the two screens of the Nintendo DS: the map is located on the bottom screen, while the top screen features story sequences, unit statistics (stats) and battle animations. The game is divided into chapters, with each chapter being the stage for a single large-scale battle that advances the story and can lead to the recruitment of new units. "Gaiden" (side story) chapters are progressively unlocked depending on how many units have been lost in battles. Prior to each chapter, players can prepare for battle, including changing a unit's currently assigned weapons, forging new weapons, and managing the inventory. The game also features limited multiplayer functionality. Using the DS' Wi-Fi Connection or normal local wireless, players can engage in voice chat with other players, engage multiplayer matches with groups of five units each, and loan units to use in the campaign.

Battles take place on a grid-based battlefield, with objectives which range from clearing enemy groups to capturing points of importance. Each map has unique terrain to be negotiated in battle ranging from mountains to rivers and flat plains. Viewed from an overhead perspective, there are castles and locations such as shops that the player can visit, the latter of which provides a means for obtaining items. Each chapter has a different set of victory conditions, which can be related to the number of turns taken or how the enemy force is dealt with. Battles play out using a turn-based system where each unit on both sides is given their chance to move and act. During battle, the combat screen appears, showing the fight from a sidelong perspective. Both sides move at least once, after which the combat screen fades. Battles between individual units are governed by the series' recurring Weapons Triangle, a rock–paper–scissors system where certain weapons have advantages over others – lances are stronger than swords, swords are stronger than axes, and axes are stronger than lances. As they participate in battles, each unit gains experience points (EXP) from their actions: they raise their experience level by one when they have accumulated 100 EXP. EXP can be earned in both normal battles and challenge fights in special arenas. Players can save at the end of each chapter or outside battle. They also have mid-chapter saves available at certain points. All units are subject to permanent death: If a unit dies in battle, they are removed from the rest of the campaign.

Units each have a character class which determines their weapon, skill set, movement and attack range, how much effect they have on other units, and whether they use passive or aggressive skills. There are thirty classes available to choose from: these include mounted units such as the Pegasus Knight, Sorcerers and Healers that wield magic for attack and healing respectively, soldiers who wield swords and axes, and archers who specialize in long-distance attacks. The only class that is character exclusive is the Lord class, which is used by Marth. When a unit has reached Level 10, their class can be evolved using an item called a Master Seal. Units can also be re-classed, changing to a completely different class or back to their original class at the player's discretion: the re-class option has limits as there are only a limited number of available classes for a unit to change into, and limitations are placed on how many of one class can be used at a time. If a class change is reversed, all the unit's previous stats will be retained. Each unit's weapon rank, which is directly associated with its class, has its level raised based on the amount of weapon usage, while also decreasing weapon durability — unless merged with another identical item, a weapon will break after its maximum number of uses.

== Synopsis ==
Shadow Dragon follows the events of the original game. In ancient times, the Shadow Dragon Medeus led a reign of terror over the continent of Archanea, before a young man named Anri used the divine sword Falchion and the mystical Fire Emblem shield to defeat Medeus and restore peace to the continent. One century later, Medeus is resurrected by the evil sorcerer Gharnef, reestablishing his empire and reclaiming his former territories. The kingdom of Altea, the original home of Anri and the birthplace of protagonist Marth, comes under attack from Gharnef's forces. Marth is forced into exile in the neighboring kingdom of Talys. Several years later, together with the king's daughter Caeda and a small band of soldiers, Marth returns to the mainland to reclaim his kingdom and defeat Medeus once again.

== Development ==
The original version of Shadow Dragon and the Blade of Light was released in 1990 for the Famicom by Intelligent Systems, who had previously created the military strategy game Famicom Wars. It was designed and written by series creator Shouzou Kaga, who envisioned a new type of role-playing experience unknown at the time. The success of Shadow Dragon and the Blade of Light launched the Fire Emblem series, of which he parted ways with after the release of the fifth installment. According to co-director Masayuki Horikawa, development started on Shadow Dragon during the development of Fire Emblem: Radiant Dawn, which released in 2007. The development period was estimated at "one and a bit years", although full development lasted ten months as the first part of development overlapped with Radiant Dawn. It was decided by Intelligent Systems to remake Shadow Dragon and the Blade of Light so more players could experience software from their early days. They also wanted players outside Japan to experience the game for the first time. The core staff included producer Tohru Narihiro and director Masayuki Horikawa from Intelligent Systems, and producer Hitoshi Yamagami and director Masaki Tawara from Nintendo.

When developing Shadow Dragon, the team did not see it as a simple remake, but rather a "renewal" of the original on a new platform with new and updated mechanics. The most difficult part was balancing this with maintaining the original version's atmosphere. Numerous features were added to the experience, such as displays for movement and attack range, the ability to change classes and unit recruitment if too many of the original army fell in battle. Expanded difficulty options and tutorials were also added to help ease newcomers into the series. The by-then well-established Weapon Triangle was also introduced, replacing the unbalanced systems from the original. The addition of a single mid-battle save was intended to help ease newcomers into the series, so they would not need to restart the entire battle if a key unit fell. The dual-screen display of both map and unit placement and status was indirectly inspired by the original version, which allowed players to view character stats without dropping out of the map.

The story and script were handled by Kouhei Maeda, Koji Kawasaki and Toshiyuki Kusakihara. Minimal additions were made to the story, as the team felt it was already a well-told narrative and did not want to complicate things for players by adding "fluff". Rather, the story content was cut down as much as possible from the original, in contrast to the expanding content and stories of later entries. Despite this, gaiden chapters were added so players could gain new characters to help them beat the game. Redesigns for main characters Marth and Caeda, along with other leading characters and some promotional artwork, was handled by Ghost in the Shell artist Masamune Shirow. Other redesigns were handled by Daisuke Izuka. The staff's aim with Marth's redesign was to update his appearance while keeping him true to expectations from the fan base. The graphics and character models for battle animations were handled by external company Alvion. The music was supervised by Yuka Tsujiyoko, the composer for multiple Fire Emblem titles including the original version. Together with new composer Saki Kasuga, Tsujiyoko both remixed music from the original version and added a large number of new and original tracks.

== Release ==
Shadow Dragon was first announced in October 2007 at a Nintendo conference, where it had yet to be given an official title. While a remake, Nintendo has included it in lists of Fire Emblem titles, variously calling it the eleventh or twelfth entry. It was confirmed for a Western release at a press summit in October 2008 for a North American release the following year, with the European release being planned for 2008. The game was localized for the West by external company 8-4; this was due to the large volume of text present in the story, which made localizing it internally difficult for Nintendo. Shadow Dragon was released in Japan on August 7, 2008; in Europe on December 5; in North America on February 16, 2009; and in Australia on February 26. The release of Shadow Dragon marked the first time any form of the first Fire Emblem game had been released outside Japan.

== Reception ==
Reception

Aggregate score
Aggregator	Score
Metacritic	81/100 (42 reviews)

Review scores
Publication	Score
1Up.com	B+
Eurogamer	8/10
Famitsu	34/40
GameSpot	7.5/10
IGN	8.5/10
Nintendo Life	8/10
Official Nintendo Magazine	86%

The gameplay was generally well received by reviewers. Famitsu generally praised the gameplay elements. One reviewer found the dual screen and mid-battle save features convenient, even though the latter diluted the tension of battle. Another felt that Shadow Dragon was the best Fire Emblem title to that date. 1UP.com's Kurtis Seid enjoyed the gameplay and strategic elements surrounding character management, but said that the multiplayer options risked upsetting the balance; he also noted that the inclusion of features for newcomers might alienate hardcore fans. Tom Bramwell, writing for Eurogamer, praised the overall feel of the game, from the dual screen functionality to the battle and character class systems, although noted nothing that elevated the game to new heights, and said that the inclusion of newcomer-friendly mechanics clashed with the permanent death mechanic. Shiva Stella of GameSpot enjoyed the tactical elements, openness to newcomers and multiplayer elements; but found the weakness of new recruits and map restrictions detracted from the experience. IGN's Daemon Hatfield, while again noting a lack of innovation, found it one of the most balanced strategy games available at the time. Stuart Reddick of Nintendo Life greatly enjoyed the gameplay experience and praised the developer's efforts at balancing the various elements, but noted that it felt dated compared to both later Fire Emblem titles and other recent titles within the genre. Fred Dutton of Official Nintendo Magazine was highly positive, praising the classic gameplay, new features, and multiplayer functions. His one major complaint was a lack of innovation.

The story received mixed opinions. Seid said that, due to the story being taken directly from the original, it was overly short and simple by modern standards. Bramwell felt the story was not as nuanced as other entries, and noted the lower number of "lovable" characters. Stella said that while the plot could get confusing, the prologue and "sophisticated" translation helped explain events. Hatfield also praised the translation, and while agreeing that the story was simpler than other Fire Emblem games, he found the scope impressive for its origins as a Famicom game. Reddick, in contrast to his praise for the gameplay, called the story fairly standard for the genre, with most of its key moments being "dull and forgettable". Dutton, while not touching the overall story, found the dialogue overly "cheesy".

Multiple critics also mentioned its presentation. Stella praised the visuals and enjoyed the music despite it sounding dated, while Hatfield praised the music but criticized the graphics as uninspired. Reddick praised the visual overhaul, despite limited animation for sprites outside battle. Dutton echoed Hatfield's sentiments about the visuals, finding them one of his main criticisms of the presentation alongside the dialogue.

During the 13th Annual Interactive Achievement Awards, the Academy of Interactive Arts & Sciences nominated Shadow Dragon for "Strategy/Simulation Game of the Year".

=== Sales ===
According to Famitsu, Shadow Dragon sold 180,697 units during its debut week in Japan, coming in at No. 2 on their charts with a 90% sell-through rate. Media Create had a slightly different assessment, placing it at No. 2 with sales of 145,000 units. By the following week, it had dropped to No. 6 with further sales of 35,000 units. According to Horikawa, Intelligent Systems were satisfied with their sales in Japan: buyers included series veterans, players who had come to know Marth through the Super Smash Bros. series, and series newcomers. In Japan, the game has sold 274,000 units in total as of 2012. Upon its release in North America, the game reached No. 2 in the dedicated Nintendo DS charts. As of 2013, the game has sold over 250,000 units in the region.
