= Fire Emblem: New Mystery of the Emblem =

2010 video game

- Cover art for New Mystery of the Emblem, featuring Marth (left) and the default male Avatar (right)
- Developer: Intelligent Systems
- Publisher: Nintendo
- Directors: Kouhei Maeda; Hideaki Araki
- Producers: Toru Narihiro; Hitoshi Yamagami
- Designers: Yuji Ohashi; Ryuichiro Koguchi
- Programmers: Yuji Ohashi; Takafumi Kaneko
- Artists: Daisuke Izuka; Takako Sakai
- Writers: Kouhei Maeda; Naohiro Yasuhara; Hiromi Tanaka; Sou Mayumi; Yuichiro Kitaoka
- Composers: Hiroki Morishita; Takeru Kanazaki; Shoh Murakami
- Series: Fire Emblem
- Platform: Nintendo DS
- Release: JP: July 15, 2010
- Genre: Tactical role-playing
- Modes: Single player, multiplayer

Fire Emblem: New Mystery of the Emblem (Note: Japanese: ファイアーエムブレム 新・紋章の謎 ～光と影の英雄～, Hepburn: Faiā Emuburemu: Shin Monshō no Nazo ~Hikari to Kage no Eiyū~; lit. Fire Emblem: New Mystery of the Emblem ~Heroes of Light and Shadow~) is a 2010 tactical role-playing game developed by Intelligent Systems and published by Nintendo for the Nintendo DS. Released in Japan only in July 2010, It is the twelfth entry in the Fire Emblem series, (Note: Sources disagree on the exact numbering: it is variously called the 12th, and 13th entry in the series.) and a remake of the Super Famicom title Fire Emblem: Mystery of the Emblem. The story is based on the original content from Mystery of the Emblem, while including a customizable Avatar as the main character alongside Marth, the protagonist of Shadow Dragon and the Blade of Light. New Mystery of the Emblem also adapts the story content from the Satellaview title BS Fire Emblem into four additional story episodes dubbed the "New Archanea Chronicles".

Preparations for New Mystery of the Emblem began during development of the 2008 DS remake of Shadow Dragon and the Blade of Light. Instead of building on Shadow Dragon for New Mystery of the Emblem, the staff started over and used the original Mystery of the Emblem as their starting point. Staff included producer Tohru Narihiro, co-director and writer Kouhei Maeda, co-director Masayuki Horikawa, and character designer Daisuke Izuka. Two of the major new elements were the customizable Avatar character and the "Casual Mode", in which units defeated in missions are revived: the latter element was a point of fierce contention between staff due to the series' long-standing tradition of permanent death for characters. It is the last Fire Emblem game to remain exclusive to Japan, as the next installment, Fire Emblem Awakening, would lead to a surge in popularity of the series worldwide and led to international releases of future games. Upon release, it received generally positive reviews and went on to sell over 274,000 units.

== Gameplay ==
A battle in New Mystery of the Emblem: on the top screen is a battle between two units, while on the bottom is the battlefield and unit placements.

Fire Emblem: New Mystery of the Emblem is a tactical role-playing game which puts players in the role of a customizable Avatar: their gender, appearance, character class and statistics can be tailored by the player. Missions are split between story-based chapters and optional side chapters: side chapters give access to new playable characters outside the main narrative. Players can save at any time during battles, with the game opening offering a save at the end of each chapter. Outside battles, the player can visit towns to buy supplies and items such as weapons. Characters recruited by the player can also engage in support conversations accessed through the battle menu: these raise a character's support rank and grant boons during battle. How characters connect through supports is documented using a relationship chart.

Battles take place on a grid-based map, with the battle system employing a turn-based system for the player, enemy units and allied units. The movement and attack ranges of enemies can be optionally displayed to players. While seventy-four units are accessible in-game by completing its chapters, only twelve can be taken into battle at any one time. When two units engage, a separate battle screen activates, and the battle plays out automatically. Enemy resistances to weapons are covered by the Weapon Triangle: lances are strong against swords, swords are strong against axes, and axes are strong against lances. Each unit gains experience points with each action, and when they accumulate 100 points, they level up and their stats are randomly raised. Each unit has a class, which affects their weaponry and movement range: these classes, when at level 10, can be promoted to a stronger class using a Master Seal item.

In addition to the single-player campaign, limited multiplayer functions are available through the Nintendo DS' Wi-Fi functionality. When the connection is active, players can battle each other in dedicated maps. Units can also be loaned between players, and an online shop is available to purchase new items and weapons with in-game currency. The game also has a time-based function where, when the game is left idle while characters are in the "unit barracks", a meter will fill up and the characters will perform limited autonomous actions: these actions can involve leveling up, or crafting new items and weapons. The game can be played with two modes: Classic Mode, which enables permanent death for characters defeated in battle, and the new Casual Mode, which revives fallen units for the next battle. In addition to this are four difficulty levels: "normal", "hard", "maniac" and "lunatic".

== Synopsis ==
The story of New Mystery of the Emblem remains from the original version. The game is set on the continent of Archanea, one year after the events of the original Fire Emblem title Fire Emblem: Shadow Dragon and the Blade of Light and its remake Fire Emblem: Shadow Dragon. In Shadow Dragon and the Blade of Light, the land was threatened by the sorcerer Gharnef, who summoned the dark dragon Medeus into the world. After fleeing an attack on his kingdom of Altea, Archanean prince Marth went on a quest to reclaim his rightful land and defeat Gharnef and Medeus. By the events of New Mystery of the Emblem, Marth's old ally Hardin has ascended the throne, expanding the military and dominating the other regions of Archanea. Marth and his allies are made to invade and conquer the regions in Hardin's name, but he eventually protests against his role and is branded a traitor to Archanea. While escaping Hardin's wrath, Marth discovers that Gharnef is still alive, and Hardin has been corrupted by his evil will as he prepares to revive Medeus.

A new sub-plot introduced in New Mystery of the Emblem involves the inclusion of a customizable Avatar, whose default name is Kris, and a group of assassins sent by Gharnef to kill Marth and his allies. The assassins initially send a spy named Katarina to infiltrate Altea as a new recruit, where she befriends Kris and the other members of her squad before revealing her true purpose and launching an attack on Marth. The recruits prevent the attack while Katarina escapes. Kris is appointed as Marth's personal bodyguard to protect him from future assassinations, and accompanies him during the war against Archanea as "The Hero of Shadow". As the main storyline unfolds, the assassins continue to attack Marth's army and attempt to kill off Marth's old allies from his previous campaign, but they are foiled and killed while Katarina can be convinced by Kris to defect and join Marth instead.

== Development and release ==
The original version of Fire Emblem: Mystery of the Emblem was released in 1994 for the Super Famicom: it was in part a remake of Shadow Dragon and the Blade of Light. Preparations for development of New Mystery of the Emblem began while development was still ongoing for Fire Emblem: Shadow Dragon, the 2008 DS remake of Shadow Dragon and the Blade of Light. The original plan was to release New Mystery of the Emblem close to Shadow Dragon, but the staff decided that they could not make New Mystery of the Emblem using the systems of Shadow Dragon, instead using the original Mystery of the Emblem as a starting point. The staff included producer Tohru Narihiro, co-director Masayuki Horikawa, co-director and scenario writer Kouhei Maeda, and composers Hiroki Morishita, Takeshi Kanezaki, Shoh Murakami. Character artwork was done by Daisuke Izuka, who had worked on revamped character art for Shadow Dragon. The team added to the original narrative with new elements such as support conversations that expanded the personalities of some characters. The game's subtitle, "Heroes of Light and Shadow" made reference to the player being a "shadow hero", hidden behind the exploits of the main characters.

The biggest point of contention among the developers was including options allowing for the revival of fallen units in "Casual Mode", a recurring discussion stretching back to the development of Fire Emblem: Genealogy of the Holy War (1996). The dispute between Intelligent Systems and Nintendo staff was fierce, but positive comments from playtests with the feature included helped those opposed come round to its inclusion. The four difficulty levels were made separate from the two modes of play, so players could adjust the experience to suit their needs. Another new element was the Avatar character, who was created so players would have an easier introduction, as the developers realized that they might end up creating the game assuming players would know about main protagonist Marth when that might not be the case. Alongside the Avatar was a new tutorial, which the developers needed to balance so it was enjoyable for series veterans while easing new players into the experience. Also new was the element of time passing when the system was turned off and the cartridge still in place. The content grew to the point that the developers contemplated dividing New Mystery of the Emblem itself into two releases.

New Mystery of the Emblem was announced by series publisher Nintendo in May 2010. Its announcement formed part of the company's 20th anniversary celebrations for the franchise. Its release date of July 15, 2010 was announced the following month. While a remake, Nintendo has it in lists of Fire Emblem titles, variously calling it twelfth and thirteenth entry. New Mystery of the Emblem did not receive a Western release, making it the first title in the series to remain exclusive to Japan since Fire Emblem: The Binding Blade in 2002. In addition to the original narrative of Mystery of the Emblem, the team remade story episodes from BS Fire Emblem, a prequel to the original game and Mystery of the Emblem originally released in 1997 for the Satellaview. The remade episodes were dubbed "New Archanea Chronicles". This was the first time content from a Satellaview title had been re-released in any form.

== Reception ==
Reception

Review scores
Publication	Score
Famitsu	34/40
RPGamer	3.5/5

Upon release, the game topped Japanese gaming charts, with initial sales of 136,000 units. Its debut sales were notably lower than its predecessor Shadow Dragon. In the following weeks, its position and sales varied, going from fourth to tenth to seventh place in the charts. As of 2012, the game has sold a total of 274,000.

Famitsu was positive on how the new narrative elements and support conversations were incorporated into the existing narrative. RPGamer's Mike Moehnke felt the additional dialogue unnecessary, as the story's complexity had not noticeably increased over the original version. He also positively noted how the Avatar was incorporated into the story, with the added chapters revolving around them making them "far more than a throwaway". 4Gamer.net's Kojiro Nishioka likewise praised the inclusion of the BS Fire Emblem chapters and the new prologue and side chapters, but felt that those who had not played Shadow Dragon would be unable to understand some of the characters.

Commenting on the gameplay, Famitsu noted that it was rather simple, but approved of the inclusion of Casual Mode and praised the content of each chapter for being just the right size. Moehnke praised the alterations made from the original version, such as not needing to dismount steeds when indoors, but also noted that some elements such as mechanics surrounding Marth showed the game's age. Nishioka generally enjoyed the gameplay experience, praising the inclusion of user-friendly options, but felt that these same new additions would divide fans.
