= Fire Emblem: The Sacred Stones =

2004 video game

- North American box art
- Developer: Intelligent Systems (Note: Co-produced and supervised by Nintendo Software Planning & Development.)
- Publisher: Nintendo
- Directors: Sachiko Wada; Taiki Ubukata; Kentaro Nishimura
- Producers: Toru Narihiro; Hitoshi Yamagami
- Programmer: Hiroyuki Fujiwara
- Artists: Sachiko Wada; Ryo Hirata
- Writer: Kouhei Maeda
- Composers: Yoshihiko Kitamura; Saki Haruyama; Yoshito Hirano
- Series: Fire Emblem
- Platform: Game Boy Advance
- Release: JP: October 7, 2004; NA: May 23, 2005; AU: November 3, 2005; EU: November 4, 2005
- Genre: Tactical role playing
- Modes: Single-player, multiplayer

Fire Emblem: The Sacred Stones (Note: Known in Japan as Fire Emblem: Seima no Kōseki (Japanese: ファイアーエムブレム 聖魔の光石, Hepburn: Faiā Emuburemu: Seima no Kōseki; lit. Fire Emblem: Light Stones of Saints and Demons)) is a tactical role-playing game developed by Intelligent Systems, and published by Nintendo for the Game Boy Advance handheld video game console in 2004 for Japan and 2005 in the West. It is the eighth entry in the Fire Emblem series, (Note: Sources disagree on the exact numbering: it is variously treated as the 8th and 9th entry in the series.) the second to be released outside Japan, and the third and final title to be developed for the Game Boy Advance after The Binding Blade and its prequel The Blazing Blade.

Set in a separate continuity to earlier Fire Emblem titles, The Sacred Stones takes place on the fictional continent of Magvel, which is divided into six nations, built around five magical stones said to be linked to the imprisonment of an ancient demon. When one of the six nations, the Grado Empire, invades its neighbors and begins destroying the stones, protagonists Eirika and Ephraim of the royal family of Renais set out to gather allies and halt Grado's conquest, while also trying to uncover the reasons for the war. The gameplay is similar to previous Fire Emblem games, focusing on turn-based, tactical movement of units across a grid-based battlefield. Core features of the game include permanent death for characters defeated in battle and support conversations that grant advantages to certain units in battle.

The Sacred Stones began development alongside Fire Emblem: Path of Radiance as a side project, sharing much of its visual design and mechanics with The Blazing Blade while incorporating elements from earlier entries such as Fire Emblem Gaiden. First announced in mid-2004, it was heavily promoted in Japan. When released, it sold over 230,000 units during 2004, with a further 90,000 being sold upon its North American debut. Reception was positive overall for its story, characters and gameplay, although many critics cited it as being too similar to its predecessor. The Sacred Stones would be the last original handheld Fire Emblem title until Fire Emblem Awakening for the Nintendo 3DS in 2012.

== Gameplay ==
A battle in The Sacred Stones: shown are Eirika and an enemy soldier during the player's turn.

Fire Emblem: The Sacred Stones is a tactical role-playing game where players take the role of royal siblings Eirika and Ephraim during separate campaigns as they fight hostile forces invading their homeland, along with allies acquired on their journey. The world's setting of Magvel is navigated using an overworld map, with routes going to different battle maps unlocked as the story progresses. In addition to story-related maps and dungeons, optional dungeons exist where chosen units can freely battle enemies, earning experience points. Each time a unit earns 100 experience points, that unit will gain a level and some of their stats will randomly increase. All characters can progress up to the 20-level cap. After a character has leveled up to 10, they have the option to be evolved using a class-specific item. A notable change from earlier games is that multiple options are available for class evolution: for instance, a Cavalier can evolve into either a Paladin or a Great Knight.

Battles use a turn-based system, with player, allied, and enemy units each taking turns to moving across a grid-based battlefield. Players can end their turn at any time, at which point the allied or enemy units can move. In each battle, the player is given command of a limited number of units and an objective to complete. Each unit's character class determines their abilities, available weapons, strength, and range of movement. For example, mounted characters can move within the remainder of their movement range if they traded with or assisted another player unit in a shorter range. Other units have the ability to "rescue" units, lowering their own stats while removing the rescued unit from harm. Depending on a unit's class and stats, items can be used heal or inflict status ailments such as "Poison" (a unit loses health each turn), "Berserk" (a unit attacks nearby units regardless of association), and immobilization ailments such as "Sleep" and "Petrify".

A key element of battle is the Weapon Triangle, a rock-paper-scissors mechanic governing which type of weapon is more effective against another. Weapon types vary from close-range melee weapons like swords and axes to long-range weapons such as bows and magical staves. Various items gathered during missions, such as healing items and weapons, can be traded with other units within the army, or sold at vendors found on the world map. All items degrade with use and will break after a certain number of uses. Different weapons also feature a minimum skill level for use, requiring units to train with that weapon type to earn the proper rank, which ranges from E to A, and then to S, the highest rank. When a unit reaches S rank with one weapon, all other weapon skills are locked at A rank.

Certain units which share a particular affinity stat can benefit from mid-battle Support Conversations. After spending a certain number of turns within a few spaces of each other, they gain the option to engage in a Support Conversation when occupying adjacent spaces. Each pair of units can have up to three Support Conversations, with each successive Support granting both units better stat bonuses in future battles if they are within three spaces of each other.

When a unit falls in battle, they are subjected to permanent death, removing them from the rest of the campaign unless the player restarts the game from a previous save file. Some character deaths, such as those of Eirika and Ephraim, end the game and require a restart from a save file.

In addition to the single-player, the game includes a local multiplayer option where four players can take chosen units into the Link Arena. Victory goes to the last group standing or to the party with the highest score depending on the match conditions. Permanent death is disabled in the Link Arena.

== Synopsis ==
The Sacred Stones is set on the continent of Magvel, which is divided into six nations. Long ago, five of these nations were each given charge of one of five magical gemstones called the Sacred Stones. The Stones were used to seal away the soul of the Demon King Fomortiis at the end of a conflict between humans and monsters over 800 years ago. The game begins when the Grado Empire, largest of the five founding nations, launches an unexpected assault on the neighboring nation of Renais, home of the royal siblings Eirika and Ephraim. Taken by surprise, Renais is defeated and the two siblings are separated: Eirika escapes to the northern nation of Frelia with the king's general Seth, while Ephraim goes underground to mount a resistance against the Grado Empire to the south. As Eirika seeks aid from the other nations and gathers allies, the land becomes plagued with undead monsters, a sign of Fomortiis's return. She is eventually reunited with Ephraim, and the two discover that Grado plans to destroy the Sacred Stones and unleash Fomortiis once more. After failed attempts to contact Grado's Prince Lyon, the twins' closest friend, they are forced to mobilize against their former ally as the Empire turns its attention to the other nations' Sacred Stones, successfully destroying the Stone of Frelia.

The siblings part ways once again, each on a mission to preserve the Stones. Eirika is forced to reach the allied nation of Rausten by passing through the new republic of Carcino, the sixth nation, and secret ally of Grado. Her forces escape Carcino by passing through the desert nation of Jehanna, where the Stone of Jehanna is destroyed and Eirika is cornered by two legions of Grado's army. Meanwhile, Ephraim is joined by allies from the nations of Frelia and within Grado itself, and they fight their way into the heart of the empire, to the very throne of Grado's emperor, Vigarde. After defeating Vigarde in battle, Prince Lyon appears and reveals that the Emperor was merely a resurrected puppet, and that he had started the war. When Vigarde died of illness months before, Lyon had feared his inability to rule Grado and became desperate to bring his father back. Lyon sacrificed his nation's Sacred Stone to revive the Emperor's body, but inadvertently absorbed the fragment of the Demon King's shattered soul sealed within. Lyon became a slave to the Fomortiis the Demon King's will, and both Lyon and Vigarde became puppets of the previously defeated Fomortiis. Lyon under the influence of the Demon King, declares that he will once more rule Magvel once the Stones are destroyed. With this revealed, he vanishes. Burdened with this knowledge, Ephraim heads to Jehanna and rescues Eirika.

Once reunited, the siblings gather their forces and liberate Renais, retrieving its true Sacred Stone, which had been replaced by a decoy when Grado invaded. After gathering reinforcements from Frelia, the twins head east to Rausten, hoping to protect its Sacred Stone. On the way, the twins are confronted by Lyon, who bests the twins and finally destroys Renais' true Sacred Stone. The twins manage to escape and retrieve the last intact Sacred Stone from Rausten. The siblings pursue Lyon to the Darkling Woods, where he is performing a ritual which will resurrect the Demon King. The twins do battle with Lyon and finally kill their former friend. This inadvertently supplies the final sacrifice that resurrects the true mastermind behind Grado's invasion of Magvel, Lyon's turn to evil, and the War of the Stones: the Demon King Fomortiis. Eirika and Ephraim use the Sacred Stone of Rausten to seal the Demon King's soul, and then their forces destroy its body. The siblings' allies from the other nations return home, while they themselves seal the final Sacred Stone away and set about restoring their nation.

== Development and release ==
The Sacred Stones was produced by long-time developer Intelligent Systems, running parallel to the development of Fire Emblem: Path of Radiance, an entry for the GameCube. According to staff, development began unexpectedly in 2003 alongside Path of Radiance: the staff thought they would not be developing another entry for the Game Boy Advance. Production on the two titles ran parallel to each other. In addition to Intelligent Systems staff, freelance staff were brought in to help with development, including former Capcom developers. Character designs were done by Sachiko Wada, who had previously worked on The Binding Blade and The Blazing Blade, the latter localized as Fire Emblem. She also acted as the game's director. A second character designer was Ryo Hirata, a designer who had worked on The Blazing Blade, in addition to projects for animation studio Production I.G. The scenario was written by Kouhei Maeda. The majority of the gameplay systems designed for Fire Emblem were carried over into The Sacred Stones, barring some minor additions. Some of its gameplay mechanics were borrowed from the 1992 entry Fire Emblem Gaiden, along with other unspecified mechanics from the Super Famicom entries. It was later stated that the inclusion of these elements was a deliberate tribute to Gaiden by the staff. The series' titular "Fire Emblem", which takes different forms across each Fire Emblem universe, appears in The Sacred Stones as the gemstone kept by the Grado Empire, which was used to seal the Demon King's soul. Its setting of Magvel is the only setting within the Fire Emblem series to date which remains unconnected to another title. The Sacred Stones would be the last Fire Emblem game to be developed for the Game Boy Advance, along with being the last original Fire Emblem on handheld devices until Fire Emblem Awakening in 2012 for Nintendo 3DS.

The Sacred Stones was first announced in Japan in June 2004, scheduled for release in Autumn that year. It released in Japan on October 7, 2004. To promote its release, a special commercial was created for broadcast in September of that year: it involved a girl playing on a Game Boy Advance being drawn into the worlds of the Fire Emblem series. Two guidebooks were also published focusing on the game, the first on October 21 and the second on November 17. A Western release was first hinted at in a Nintendo report, revealing its prospective release of both Path of Radiance and what would turn out to be The Sacred Stones. It was released in 2005 in North America, Australia, and Europe on May 23, November 3, and November 4, respectively. The Sacred Stones was the second Fire Emblem to be released in both North America and Europe. According to Nintendo Treehouse staff members Tim O'Leary and Alan Averill, The Sacred Stones was an easier game to localize for as it had less text content than its predecessor. The move from the first Western game to The Sacred Stones and Path of Radiance meant that any work on localizing The Binding Blade could not be managed. The title was later re-released as part of Nintendo's promotional "3DS Ambassador Program" as a free download on December 16, 2011. It was later re-released on the Wii U Virtual Console: it was released in Japan on August 6, 2014, the PAL regions on January 1, 2015, and in North America on June 18 the same year. It was re-released onto the Nintendo Classics service for Nintendo Switch on April 22, 2025.

== Reception ==
Reception

Aggregate scores
Aggregator	Score
GameRankings	84% (49 reviews)
Metacritic	85/100 (38 reviews)

Review scores
Publication	Score
1Up.com	B+
Eurogamer	8/10
Famitsu	35/40
GameSpot	8.8/10
GameSpy	4.5/5
IGN	8.5/10
NGC Magazine	4/5
PALGN	9/10
RPGamer	4/5
RPGFan	82%

Upon its day of release in Japan, The Sacred Stones sold 97,842 units, achieving a sell-through rate of just over 64%. By the end of 2004, the game had sold 233,280 units, reaching #48 in Famitsu's annual video game sales rankings. In North America, The Sacred Stones was among the top 20 games in the Nintendo hardware charts, with sales of 96,000 units. Although no exact total sales figures have been published, Nintendo cited the game as being among its successful Game Boy Advance titles for 2005.

Famitsu praised the story, with one reviewer saying the characters had a tasteful charm. Karen Chu of 1UP.com said the story shone through, keeping players from burning out after the battle segments. IGN's Craig Harris called the storytelling "absolutely top-notch, if just a little wordy for comfort", praising the writing for making him care about his characters. David Chapman of GameSpy noted the storyline being rich. GameSpot's Greg Kasavin said that The Sacred Stones had "a well-written, surprisingly sophisticated narrative featuring plenty of endearing heroes and villains". Eurogamer's Tom Bramwell called the storytelling "wonderful", positively noting the more exotic narrative when compared to its predecessor. Simon Parkin, writing for NGC Magazine, praised the game's "delightful, uncurling narrative", and positively noted the translation quality as it helped him understand the workings of the game's world and characters. PALGN reviewer Mark Marrow said the story was a step above its predecessor, calling it "a beautiful narrative featuring plenty of action from villains and heroes, and even some comic relief in-between all of this". Matthew Foster of RPGamer, while noting the quality of the translation, said that the story was the game's weakest point due to its clichéd nature. RPGFan's Alan Knight called the plot "light and fairly easy-going", noting its eccentric characters eased players along.

Speaking about the gameplay, Famitsu enjoyed the tactical gameplay and new elements, along with appreciating the thrill induced by permadeath. A minor criticism was issues with the pacing. Harris enjoyed the gameplay despite noting that little had changed since the release of Fire Emblem, saying that players would not find any notable changes from their original experience. Chapman positively noted the improvements made since the release of Fire Emblem, along with positively noting the multiplayer options. Kasavin praised the deep strategy gameplay, and positively noted that it was geared towards players of various ages and skill levels. Foster called the gameplay the game's biggest feature and greatest strength despite not having changed much since the previous game. Knight enjoyed the gameplay experience, but was mixed about the lack of true innovations, feeling that it was an overly similar experience to earlier Fire Emblem games. Bramwell enjoyed the gameplay despite getting frustrated with permadeath and positively noted the nuances in character customization. Parkin stated that it was quite easy to spend large amounts of time creating the perfect strategy, and that restarting a level after a character died or going to one of the EXP maps to boost character levels was extremely tempting. In the latter case, he noted it might upset the game's intended difficulty. Marrow enjoyed his time with the game, and praised the additional features that made playing easier for newcomers.
