= Crimea (disambiguation) =

Crimea, or the Crimean Peninsula, historically also known as the Tauric Chersonese (Tauric Peninsula, Tauric, Taurica, or Tauris), is a major peninsula in the north of the Black Sea.

Crimea may also refer to:

== Places ==
=== Crimean Peninsula ===
==== Republic of Crimea ====
- Republic of Crimea (1992–1995), the government of Crimea after the dissolution of the Soviet Union
- Autonomous Republic of Crimea, within Ukraine, occupied by Russia since 2014
- Republic of Crimea (Russia) (2014–present), a claimed federal subject of Russia (partially recognized)

==== Historical ====
- Roman Crimea (47 BCE–c. 340 CE and 6th–13th century)
- Theme of Cherson – Byzantine theme located in southern Crimea (833/840–1204 CE)
- Principality of Theodoro (1204–1475), in the beginning as Perateia, part of the Trapezuntine Empire (1204–1261)
- Crimean Khanate (1441–1783)
- Taurida Governorate (1802–1917), in the Russian Empire
- During the Russian Civil War:
  - Crimean People's Republic, a short-lived secular Muslim state (December 1917–January 1918)
  - Taurida Soviet Socialist Republic (1918)
  - Crimean Regional Government (1918–1919)
- Crimean Socialist Soviet Republic (1919)
- Crimean Autonomous Soviet Socialist Republic (1921–1945), in the RSFSR
- Crimean Autonomous Soviet Socialist Republic (1921–1945), within the Russian SFSR, in the Soviet Union; see Crimea in the Soviet Union
- Crimea-Taurida, part of the Reichskommissariat Ukraine when Nazi Germany occupied the country in WWII
- Crimean Oblast (1945–1991) within the Soviet Union
- Crimean Autonomous Soviet Socialist Republic (1991–1992), within the Ukrainian SSR, in the Soviet Union
- Crimean Federal District (2014–2016), a federal district of Russia

=== Elsewhere ===
- Crimea, Louisiana, an unincorporated community in Tensas Parish, Louisiana, United States
- Crimea, Virginia, an unincorporated community in Dinwiddie County, Virginia, United States
- Crimea, Queensland, a locality in Australia
- 1140 Crimea, a main-belt asteroid
- Crimea Pass, a mountain pass in north Wales

== Other uses ==
- Crimea, a fictional country in the video games Fire Emblem: Path of Radiance and Fire Emblem: Radiant Dawn
- Crimea Air, a defunct airline
- History of Crimea, the recorded history of the Crimean Peninsula, begins around the 5th century BC when several Greek colonies were established along its coast
- Crimea: The Dawn of Modern Warfare, a 1975 board wargame that simulates the Crimean War 1853–1856
- Crimea (WWII game), a 1977 board wargame that simulates the Crimean Campaign during WWII

== See also ==
- Crimea Medal (disambiguation)
- Crimean War (disambiguation)
- Russian Crimea (disambiguation)
- Cimmeria (disambiguation)
- Chimera (disambiguation)
- Krim (disambiguation)
- Krym (disambiguation)
- Krymsky (disambiguation)
- Stary Krym, the city eponymous of the name of the peninsula
- Crimean (disambiguation)
