= Crimean campaign (disambiguation) =

Crimean campaign can refer to:

- The Russian Crimean campaigns of 1687 and 1689
- The main campaign of the Crimean War, 1853–1855
- The German Crimean Campaign, 1941–1942
- The Soviet Crimean Offensive, 1944

== See also ==
- Crimean War (disambiguation)
