= Crimean War (disambiguation) =

The Crimean War was fought between the Russian Empire and the Ottoman Empire (plus Ottoman allies France, Britain, and Sardinia) from October 1853 to March 1856.

Crimean War may also refer to:

- Genoese–Mongol Wars (13th–15th centuries), part of the Mongol invasion of Europe
- Crimean–Nogai slave raids in Eastern Europe (1441–1774), led by the Ottoman-backed Crimean Khanate against Russia and other European polities
- Crimean campaign (1475), led by the Ottoman Empire to Turkify and Islamize the Crimean Peninsula
- Russo-Crimean Wars (16th–17th centuries), between Russia and the Crimean Khanate
  - Crimean campaign of 1646
  - Crimean campaigns of 1687 and 1689
- Polish–Ottoman Wars (15th–17th centuries), including battles over Crimea
- Crimea Operation (1918), led by Germany and Ukraine against Soviet Russia during World War I
- Crimean campaign (1941–1942), led by Germany against the Soviet Union during World War II
- Crimean offensive (1944), conducted by the Soviet Union against Germany during World War II
- Russian occupation of Crimea (2014–present), part of the Russo-Ukrainian war
  - 2014 Russian annexation of Crimea
- Battle of Crimea (2022–present), following the Russian invasion of Ukraine during the Russo-Ukrainian war.

== See also ==
- Crimea (disambiguation)
