= Krims =

Krims is a surname. Notable people with the surname include:

- Les Krims (born 1942), American photographer
- Milton Krims (1904–1988), American screenwriter, journalist, and novelist

== See also ==
- Krim (disambiguation)
- Crim (surname)
