= The Crimea =

The Crimea may refer to:

- Crimea (disambiguation), several geographic entities in Eastern Europe
- The Crimean War of 1854 to 1856
- The Crimea (band), a British band
