= Crim =

Crim may refer to:

- CRIM, the revenue service of the municipalities of Puerto Rico
- Crim (surname)
- Crim Festival of Races, a set of races including 'The Crim' held in August
- A character from .Hack//Sign

== See also ==
- Crims, a British comedy television series
- Krim (disambiguation)
- Crime (disambiguation)
- Criminal (disambiguation)
