= Battle of Sudbischi =

Battle between Russia and Crimean Khanate

- Part of Russo-Crimean Wars
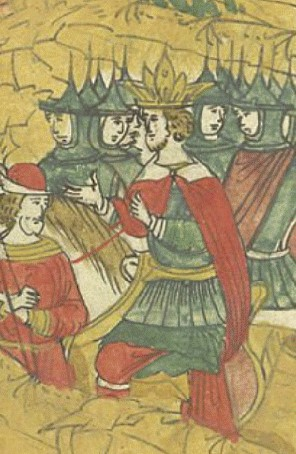
- Devlet Giray I and his army on the campaign of Tula
Date	24–25 June [O.S. 11–12 June] 1555
Location	Sudbischi village, Russian Tsardom (modern Russia, Oryol region)
Result	Russian victory

Belligerents
Crimean Khanate; Ottoman Empire	Russian Tsardom

Commanders and leaders
Devlet I Giray	Ivan Sheremetyev (WIA)

Strength
40,000 to 60,000	4,000 to 7,000

Casualties and losses
Extremely heavy	Heavy

The Battle of Sudbischi (Russian: Судбищенская битва) was a battle that took place between the troops of the Crimean Khanate led by Devlet Giray and the Russian army led by Ivan Sheremetyev. The battle ended with the retreat of the Crimean troops and a Russian victory.

== Background ==
After the failure of the Tatar campaign against Tula in 1552, A correspondence began between the Russian Tsar and the Crimean Khan, in which Devlet I Giray offered friendship to the Russians, but in return demanded tribute, which the Russian Tsar refused.
In 1555, the Crimean Khan went to war in the land of the Pyatigorsk Circassians, after which Ivan the Terrible sent the commander Ivan Sheremetyev, with an army of thirteen thousand, to meet the Khan.

== The number of the army ==
Old sources cite party figures of 60,000 for Tatars and 13,000 for Russians. (Note: Russian chronicle defines the forces directly during the battle at 7,000 Russians and 60,000 tatars, most likely Karamzin takes into account all the troops, including those who did not participate in the battle.) In modern historiography, this seems to be overstated for both sides. The historian Vitaly Penskoi gives the number of the Tatar army at 40,000 and the Russian force at 4,000. Another source takes the figure of 60,000 for the Tatars as accurate. It is also noted that the Russians did not have artillery, while the Crimeans did—with support from Ottoman artillery and Janissaries.

== Battle ==
Khan hoped for a quick success, having an almost 10-fold advantage. Left with an army of seven thousand, Sheremetev did not shy away from the battle and broke the advanced regiment of the Tatars, took the banner of the Shirin princes, and he was seriously wounded. The small Russian army still could not withstand the pressure, got mixed up and ran. But Alexey Basmanov and Stefan Sidorov managed to stop the fleeing and settled down with two thousand in an oak grove and in a gully (on a slope), where the wagon train stood, turned into a fortress on wheels. They cut down trees so that their tops fell towards the enemy. The stumps were left high so that the archers and archers had something to hide behind. Some of the trees were taken out into the field, where a large number of anti-window "thorns" were scattered. The wounded were dragged there, including Sheremetyev. Khan carried out an assault three times, but, unable to quickly defeat the Russians and fearing the approach of the tsar's army, he went into the steppes. Turkish chronicle sources of the XVI century report: "Someone godless, an infidel, who, by his boar bravery, is dog-mad" Russian elite units "Boyar's children" lost 1,100 people and an unknown number of Cossacks, only a few remained intact, the losses of the Crimeans are unknown, but many more than Russians, most likely extremely high.

== Aftermath ==
The Tsar, having received news that Sheremetev had allegedly been defeated, moved forward, but met Sheremetev and the rest of the commanders. After the battle, the Crimeans retreated to their lands.
