= Ike (Fire Emblem) =

Video game character

- Fire Emblem character
- Ike as he appears in Fire Emblem: Path of Radiance
- First game: Fire Emblem: Path of Radiance (2005)
- Designed by: Senri Kita
- Voiced by: English; Jason Adkins (2005–2016); Greg Chun (2017–present); Japanese; Michihiko Hagi

Ike (Japanese: アイク, Hepburn: Aiku) is a character from the Fire Emblem series of video games. He is the central protagonist and Lord-class character of the ninth game in the series, Fire Emblem: Path of Radiance, and one of the central characters in Fire Emblem: Radiant Dawn. Ike is one of the most popular characters in the Fire Emblem series, and has appeared in other media, most notably the Super Smash Bros. fighting game series.

== Development ==
The character designs were done by Senri Kita in Fire Emblem: Path of Radiance, an artist new to the series. In contrast to several other Fire Emblem games, where the protagonist was raised as a royal, the main character Ike, despite being of Knightly lineage, was raised as a mercenary who only becomes involved in royal politics and conflict during the events of the story. Ike was born from the many ideas for new directions being suggested for the new 3D game, with many people wanting the protagonist everyone could empathize with. His status as a mercenary was a highly requested character trait by male staff.

In Fire Emblem: Radiant Dawn, the character movements in cutscenes were mapped using motion capture, with between 100 and 150 animations per character to implement. The dialogue for characters was also made slightly rougher based on feedback from Path of Radiance.

Ike's personality and blue hair are derived from Hector, the protagonist of Fire Emblem: The Blazing Blade; the game's release in Europe and North America led Ike's creators to discover that he was one of the most popular characters in the series.

== Appearances ==
Ike is the primary protagonist of Fire Emblem: Path of Radiance, the plot of which centers around his efforts to repel an invasion and avenge the murder of his father. He also serves as one of the two main protagonists of Fire Emblem: Radiant Dawn, where he battles the forces of a corrupt goddess. He is also featured as a bonus character in Fire Emblem Fates and Code Name S.T.E.A.M., both of which make him playable upon the player linking their Amiibo with the game. He is also a playable character in Fire Emblem Heroes, being available in five variations based on his appearances in Path of Radiance and Radiant Dawn. Ike later reappears in Fire Emblem Engage as an Emblem.

Outside of the Fire Emblem series, Ike was also included in a number of other Nintendo related games, including the Super Smash Bros. series. Ike was a playable character in Nintendo's 2008 cross-over fighting game Super Smash Bros. Brawl as part of the game's core fighting cast. One of his special moves in the game is "Aether", which is a unique skill in Path of Radiance that only he can learn. He uses the weapon Ragnell, a two handed-sword which he wields with one hand. He later appeared in the follow-up title, 2014's Super Smash Bros. for Nintendo 3DS and Wii U, redesigned to match his Radiant Dawn appearance. Coinciding with the game's release, Ike received an amiibo figure. He once again appeared in 2018's Super Smash Bros. Ultimate, where players can choose between his appearances from Path of Radiance and Radiant Dawn.

== Reception ==
Ike has generally been a well-received character, and is known as one of the more popular Fire Emblem characters. In Nintendo's character polls for Fire Emblem Heroes, Ike was voted most popular male character and had received the most overall votes in total, split between his incarnations. Polygon noted that Ike was one of the most famous Fire Emblem characters, something they cited as being due to his inclusion in the Smash Bros games. Series producer Toru Narihiro attributed an increase in popularity for both Ike and fellow Fire Emblem character Marth to their appearances in Super Smash Bros. Brawl, adding that it grew beyond the staff's expectations. As a fighter in Super Smash Bros. for Nintendo 3DS and WiiU specifically, his inclusion was generally well-received, although Kotaku reported that Japanese fans mocked and criticized his more muscular redesign, with some alleging that he looked more gorilla-like than before. The top four characters in the polls received new in-game costumes; Heather Alexandra of Kotaku has praised Ike's original costume by stating that "Ike's always been a bit blunt and rugged, and this costume really gets to the heart of that. He trades the heavy blue and red tones of his original outfit to trade them in for some earthier colors". There are seven total Fire Emblem characters appearing in Super Smash Bros. Ultimate, complaints again arose that he played too similar to other characters. Masahiro Sakurai noted to everyone that people don't need to blame him for the addition of sword fighters and saying that "even if it is another sword fighter, it will be fine as long as we balance them properly". Jeremy Parish of Polygon ranked 73 fighters from Super Smash Bros. Ultimate "from garbage to glorious", placing Ike at 66th, and stated that "a cloned version of fan-favorite Marth, Ike has no reason to exist in Smash". Gavin Jasper of Den of Geek ranked the Ike 44th on his list of Super Smash Bros. Ultimate characters: "After Marth and Roy introduced the sword-swinging style of Fire Emblem to Smash, Ike spruced it up with some snazzier animations and attacks".

Ike's relationship with Soren has been discussed by critics, with Paste Magazine writer Substitute Thapliyal citing their interactions as an example of perceived homoerotic subtext in the series that ultimately remained unconfirmed, which the article described as part of a broader pattern of queerbaiting within the franchise.
