= Crimean (disambiguation) =

Crimean means pertaining to Crimea.

Crimean may also refer to:

- Crimean Tatar language
- Crimean Tatars

== See also ==
- Crimea (disambiguation)
