= Russian Crimea =

Russian Crimea may refer to:

- Republic of Crimea, occupied Ukraine and federal subject of Russia since 2014
- Taurida Oblast, province of the Russian Empire from 1784 until 1796
- Taurida Governorate, governorate of the Russian Empire from 1802 until 1921
- Crimean People's Republic, autonomy of the Russian DFR between 1917 and 1918
- Taurida Soviet Socialist Republic, federal subject of the Russian SFSR in 1918

== See also ==
- Russian (disambiguation)
- Russia (disambiguation)
- Crimea (disambiguation)
