= Krym =

Krym may refer to:

- Crimea, in Ukrainian and Russian
- Port Krym, a port in Crimea

== See also ==
- Crimea (disambiguation)
- Krim (disambiguation)
