= Crimean campaign of Tula =

Campaign of Tula
- Part of Russo-Crimean Wars
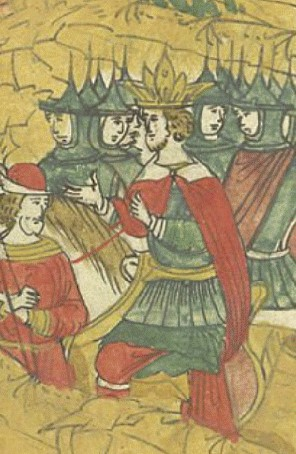
- Devlet I Giray before the march to Tula with his army
Date	June 1552
Location	Ryazan and Tula lands, Russian Tsardom (modern Russia)
Result	Russian victory

Belligerents
Crimean Khanate; Ottoman Empire	Russia

Commanders and leaders
Devlet I Giray; Cambirday †	Ivan IV Vasilyevich; Andrey Kurbsky (WIA); Mikhail Vorotynsky; Ivan Sheremetev

Strength
30,000	15,000

Crimean campaign of Tula was a campaign of Crimean khan Devlet I Giray against the Russian Tsardom to stop the Russian offensive against Kazan. The result of the campaign was the retreat of the Crimean troops and the successful campaign of Russian troops against the Kazan Khanate

== Background ==
In 1552, the Russian tsar Ivan the Terrible, was going to destroy the Kazan Khanate and began to prepare for a campaign of Kazan. Mikhail Vorotynsky and the main army went to Kolomna, and Ivan IV, along with Andrei Kurbsky and Ivan Sheremetev, set off on June 16. Arriving in Kolomna, the tsar received news that the Crimeans had moved towards Ryazan.

== The forces of the parties ==
Russian historian Nikolai Karamzin estimates the Russian army at 15,000 men, while the Crimean army at 30,00.
In the book by Vitaly Penskoi, it is claimed that the Russian tsar complained that only 15,000 people gathered with him on a campaign against Kazan. According to him, the Crimean army was numerically superior to the Russian

== Campaign of Devlet Giray ==
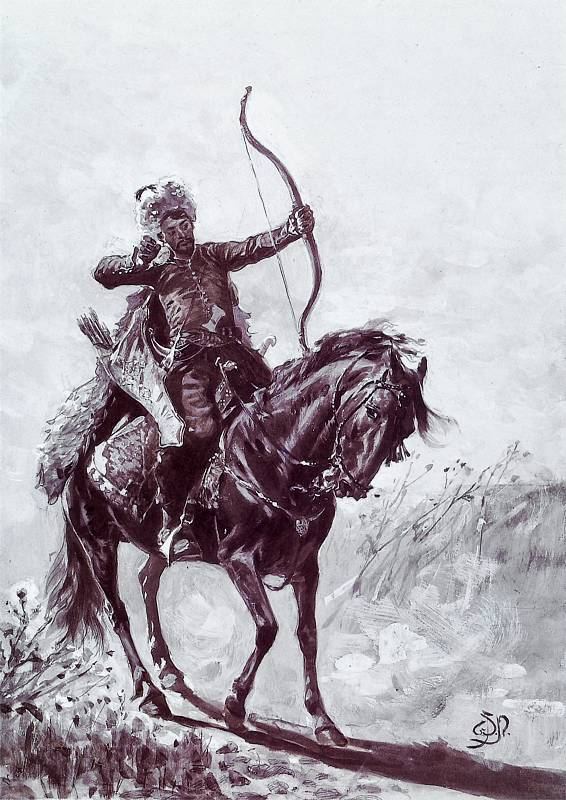
Crimean horse archer

The day after the Russian tsar received the news that the Crimean army was moving towards them, he hastily deployed his troops on the banks of the Oka. At that time, the Crimeans captured several Russian people near Ryazan and learned from them that the tsar had deployed troops on the banks of the Oka. This came as a surprise to the Crimean Khan, because he hoped that the Russian troops would march on Kazan, and recalling the experience of 1541, he decided to abandon the campaign, but it was impossible to retreat without doing anything, so Devlet I Giray convened a council of princes, at which he was advised to go to Tula, disobey them he could not, because they had recently brought him to power and the Crimean Khan turned his army on Tula
On June 21, news came that a small Crimean army appeared near Tula, but they robbed several villages and hastily disappeared.
The Russians did not know the goals of the Crimeans, nor whether the Khan himself led the army. However, on June 22, the main Crimean army, led by Devlet I Giray, reappeared at Tula. Having set up camp, the Crimean army began a siege.

== Siege of Tula ==
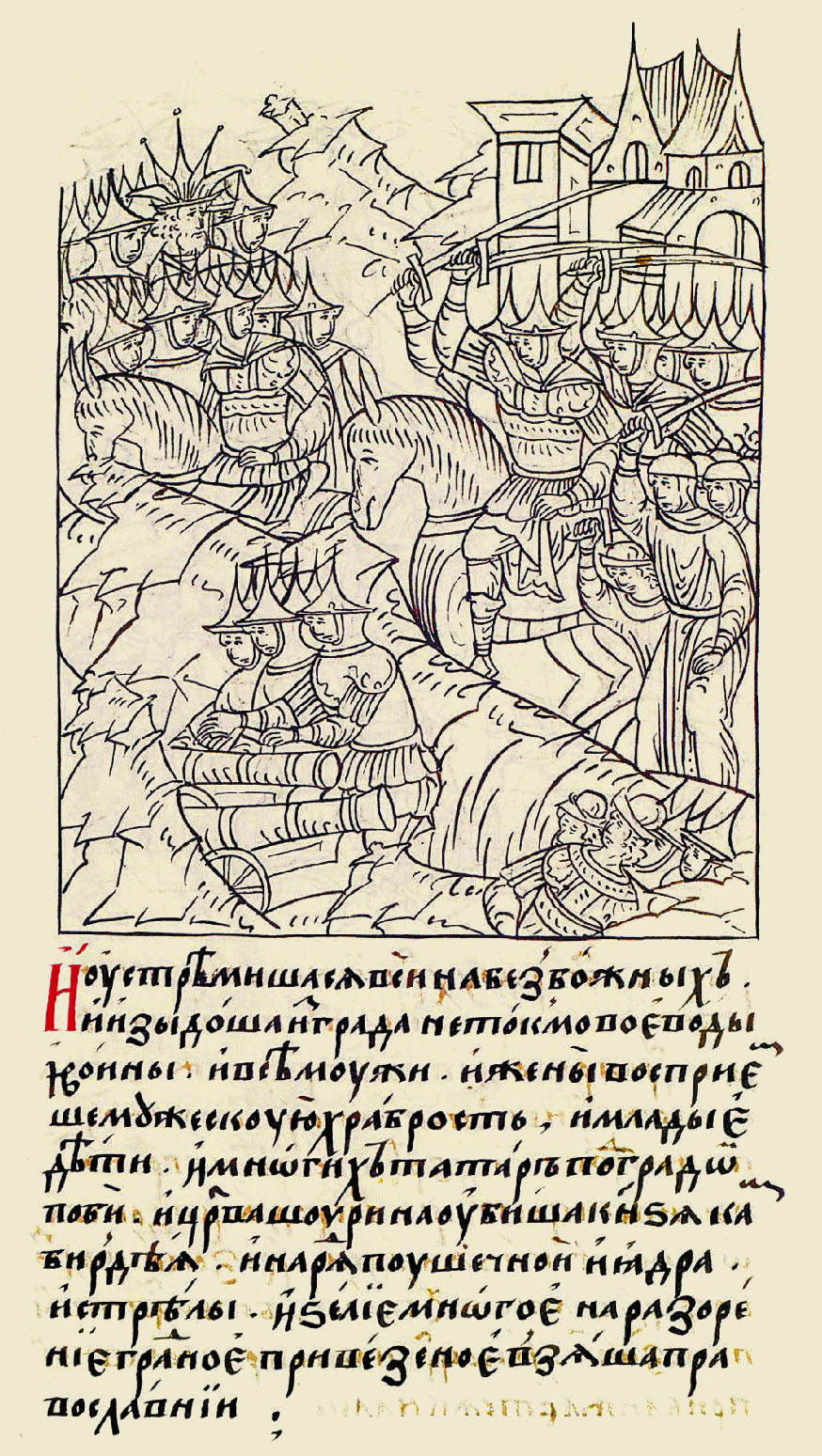
A miniature from the front chronicle about the siege of Tula

On the same day, the Crimean troops began shelling the city and trying to capture it. However, despite all their efforts, the Tula garrison was not only able to successfully defend the fortress, the Russian troops managed to conduct a successful sortie. At this time, the Russian tsar sent his army to Tula. Upon learning of the approach of Russian troops, the Crimean Khan hastily retreated, abandoning the wagons and a small part of his army. By morning, the Crimean army was 40 km from Tula

== Battles near Tula and on Shivron river ==
The ongoing siege of Tula worried Ivan, he decided to carry out a false maneuver in order to gain time for the city, he pretended that his entire army was going to Tula, which forced the khan to temporarily retreat, in fact, only a fast detachment of Prince Vorotynsky and went to the Tatars. The main actions took place between June 22 and 23, on the first day 15,000 Russian troops attacked 30,000 Crimean troops directly near Tula and held the victory, the persecution was organized only by advanced detachments. In the battle, Prince Kurbsky received several severe wounds. On the second day, the Russians were successful again in the rearguard action on Shivron, they captured the Khan's convoy, freeing all the prisoners captured earlier in the vicinity of Tula. Two heavy defeats forced the Crimeans to completely abandon their plans for Kazan, the skillful actions of a weaker Russian detachment allowed the main forces to prepare for a heavy and long siege, which ended with the capture of the city on October 2.

== Aftermath ==
Ivan returned to Kolomna, informed everyone about the victory over the enemy, sent trophies to Moscow and ordered a campaign against Kazan. After an unsuccessful campaign, the Crimean Khan abandoned all attempts to help the Kazan Khanate and retreated to the Crimea. In the same year, the Russian Tsardom captured Kazan.
In 1553, the city of Dedilov was restored, destroyed during the Tatar invasion, and later turned into a fortress
