= Krymsky =

Krymsky (masculine), Krymskaya (feminine), or Krymskoye (neuter) may refer to:

Places

- Crimean Peninsula (Krymsky poluostrov), a peninsula in Ukraine on the northern coast of the Black Sea
- Krymsky District, a district of Krasnodar Krai, Russia
- Krymskoye Urban Settlement, a municipal formation in Krymsky Municipal District of Krasnodar Krai, Russia
- Krymsky (rural locality) (Krymskaya, Krymskoye), several rural localities in Russia
- Krymskaya (Moscow Central Circle), a Moscow Metro station in Moscow, Russia
- Krymsky Bridge, a steel suspension bridge in Moscow, Russia
- Krymsky Val, a street, in Moscow, Russia

People

- Ahatanhel Krymsky, academician of the early National Academy of Sciences of Ukraine
- Vasily Dolgorukov-Krymsky, original owner of the building in Moscow, Russia which is now the House of the Unions
