= Krymsky (rural locality) =

Krymsky (Russian: Крымский; masculine), Krymskaya (Крымская; feminine), or Krymskoye (Крымское; neuter) is the name of several rural localities in Russia.

Modern localities

- Krymsky, Republic of Bashkortostan, a selo in Abdrashitovsky Selsoviet of Alsheyevsky District of the Republic of Bashkortostan
- Krymsky, Semikarakorsky District, Rostov Oblast, a settlement in Zadono-Kagalnitskoye Rural Settlement of Semikarakorsky District of Rostov Oblast
- Krymsky, Ust-Donetsky District, Rostov Oblast, a khutor in Krymskoye Rural Settlement of Ust-Donetsky District of Rostov Oblast
- Krymskoye, Kaliningrad Oblast, a settlement under the administrative jurisdiction of the urban-type settlement of district significance of Zheleznodorozhny in Pravdinsky District, Kaliningrad Oblast
- Krymskoye, Moscow Oblast, a selo under the administrative jurisdiction of the Town of Kubinka in Odintsovsky District of Moscow Oblast

Renamed localities

- Krymskaya, name of a stanitsa in Krasnodar Krai until 1953, when it was transformed into a town and renamed Krymsk
