= Battle of Molodi =

Battle in 1572 between Russians and Crimeans

Coordinates: 55°30′N 37°32′E

- Part of the Russo-Crimean Wars and Russo-Turkish wars
Date	29 July – 2 August 1572
Location	Molodi, c. 50 km (31 mi) south of Moscow
Result	Russian victory

Belligerents
Tsardom of Russia; Don Cossacks; Zaporozhian Sich	Crimean Khanate; Nogai Horde

Commanders and leaders
Mikhail Vorotynsky (army commander); Dmitry Khvorostinin (key figure); Mikhail Cherkashenin	Devlet I Giray; Divey Murza (POW)

Strength
20,000 to 70,000 men (Note: 20,000, 35,000 (Note: See § Order of Battle), 70,000)	30,000 cavalrymen (Note: Contemporary Russian sources and later modern Russian historians drawing on these claims, claimed the Tatar army numbered around 60,000 to 120,000 men. However, its been argued that these figures reflect wartime propaganda rather than a reliable count. V.V. Penskoy's dedicated study of the 1572 campaign directly addresses and rejects the 120,000 figure as inflated. He traces it back to 16th century diplomatic correspondence and propaganda rather than a reliable count. He also explicitly argues that even the 100,000 figure supposedly supplied by Devlet Giray to the Ottoman court, and reported by Muscovite envoy I.P. Novosiltsev as also inflated. The total population of the Crimean Khanate in the mid 17th century, which was around 187,000 as recorded by Evliya Celebi, couldn't physically sustain such a gargantuan army.)

Casualties and losses
Unknown	Unknown (Note: Russian sources that also claim the Crimean army numbered around 120,000 men, claim that the Tatar army suffered 15,000 dead or wounded and 12,000 drowned. They also claim that 40–100,000 men perished during the retreat to Crimea. So much so that Spencer Tucker claimed that out of this 120,000 men army, only 20,000 men made it back home.. However, these sources that claim the fighting-age male population of Crimea was essentially wiped out isnt supported anywhere in any specialist literature. The historiographical article "Mythology and the Realities of the Battle of Molodi" that directly addresses this claim and argues that contemporary Russian sources attributed the khan's retreat to fear of additional Russian reinforcements rather than the massive catastrophic losses later chroniclers claimed, and that prosopographical study of the Crimean aristocracy shows no such demographic collapse in 1572.)

The Battle of Molodi (Russian: Би́тва при Мóлодях) was one of the key battles of Ivan the Terrible's reign. It was fought near the village of Molodi, circa 50 km (31 mi) south of Moscow, in July–August 1572 between the army of Crimea led by Khan Devlet I Giray and the army of Russians and Cossacks led by Prince Mikhail Vorotynsky. The Crimeans had defeated the Russian army and burned Moscow the previous year.

== Background ==
While the Tsardom of Russia was involved in the Livonian War, the Crimean khan hoped to make profit from the weakness of its southern borders. In the course of three expeditions, Devlet I Giray devastated South Russia, defeated the Russian army and set Moscow on fire in 1571. On 26 July 1572, the Crimean army, numbering around 30,000 cavalrymen, marched towards Russia. Spencer Tucker also claimed that the Tatar army was also equipped with cannons and reinforced by janissaries. He also claimed that while crossing the Oka River near Serpukhov, the Tatars decimated the Russian vanguard.

== Battle ==
The Russian forces, variously estimated at between 20,000 and 70,000 men, were placed under the supreme command of Prince Mikhail Vorotynsky. Prince Repnin led the left flank, while the right flank was commanded by Prince Odoevsky. On 30 July the armies clashed near the Lopasnya River without much prior reconnaissance. The fighting continued for several days, reaching its peak on 8 August. The large amount of close melee fighting made the Tatars' famed skill in archery quite useless: The battle was fought primarily with sabers and spears. Artillery and arquebuses were also used by the Russians to great effect.

The Tatars could not break through the fortified Russian defenses due to their lack of gunpowder weaponry, nor could they force the Russians into a pitched battle in the open field, so they had to call off the campaign as another Russian army was on the way to reinforce Vorotynsky's force. The Tatars marched back to Crimea without suffering much harm along the way.

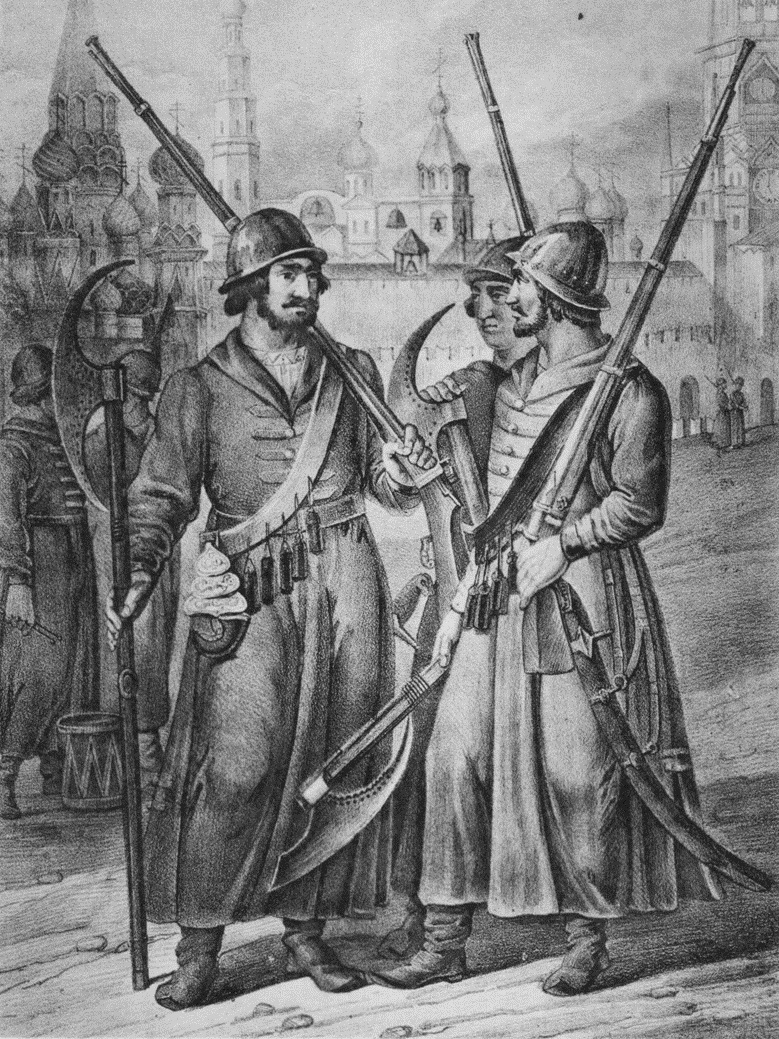
Moscow streltsy

Crimean Tatar light cavalrymen crossing a river in Hungary.

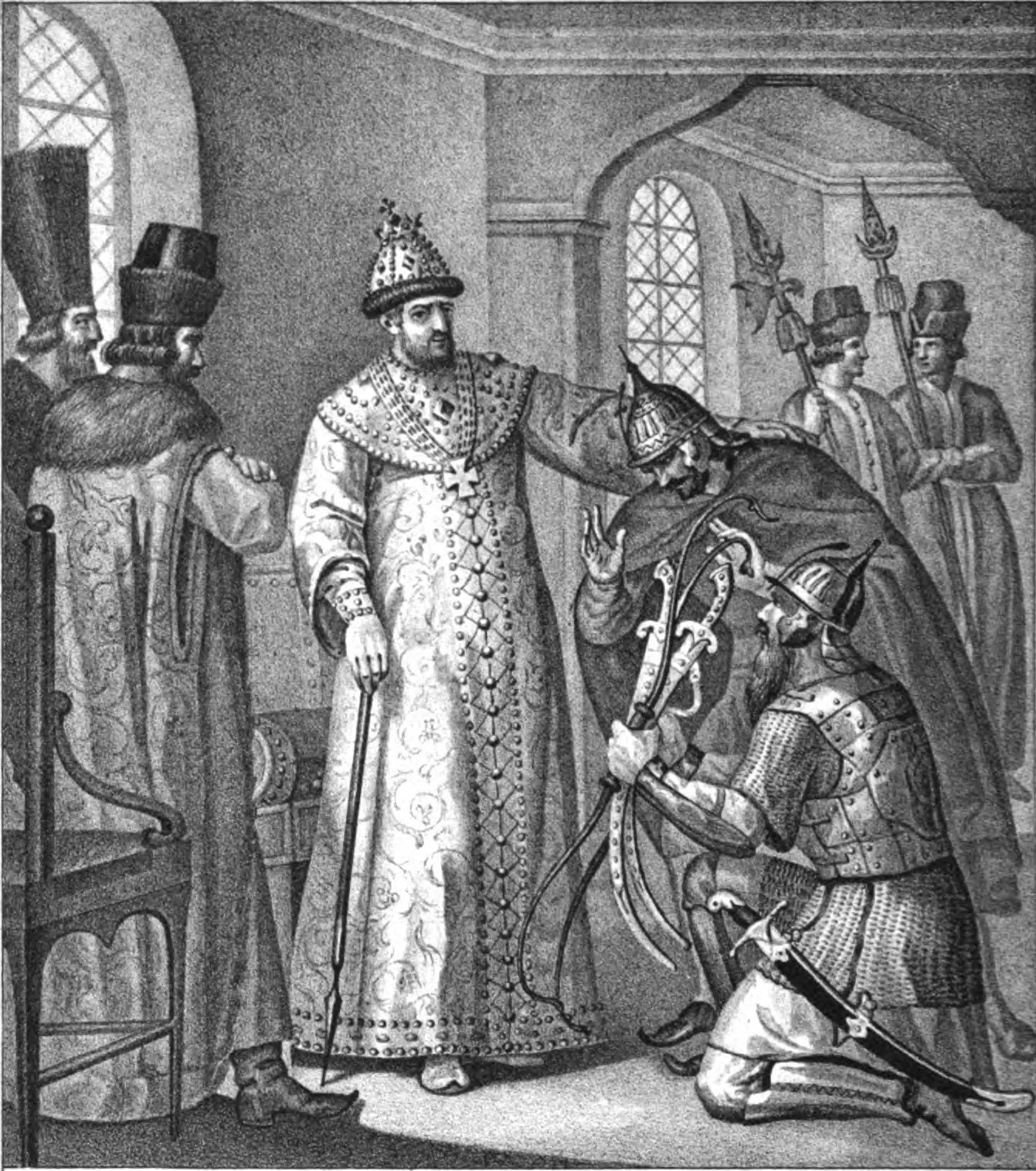
Ivan IV is presented with trophies taken from Devlet Giray by Vorotynsky after the battle. By Boris Chorikov

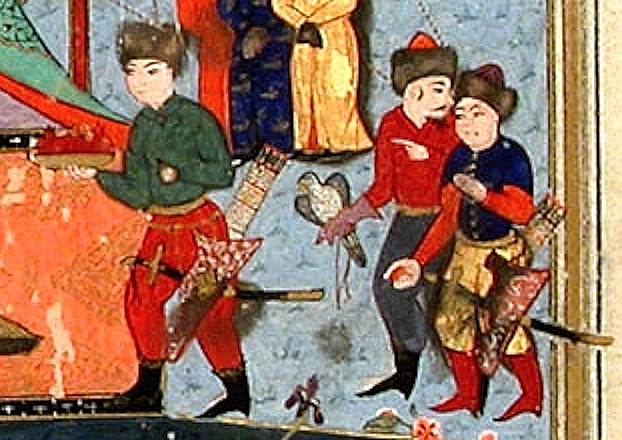
Depiction of Crimean Tatar horsemen at the camp of Adil Giray in 1578

Devlet I Giray's son, Ğazı II Giray, slaying an enemy soldier in combat

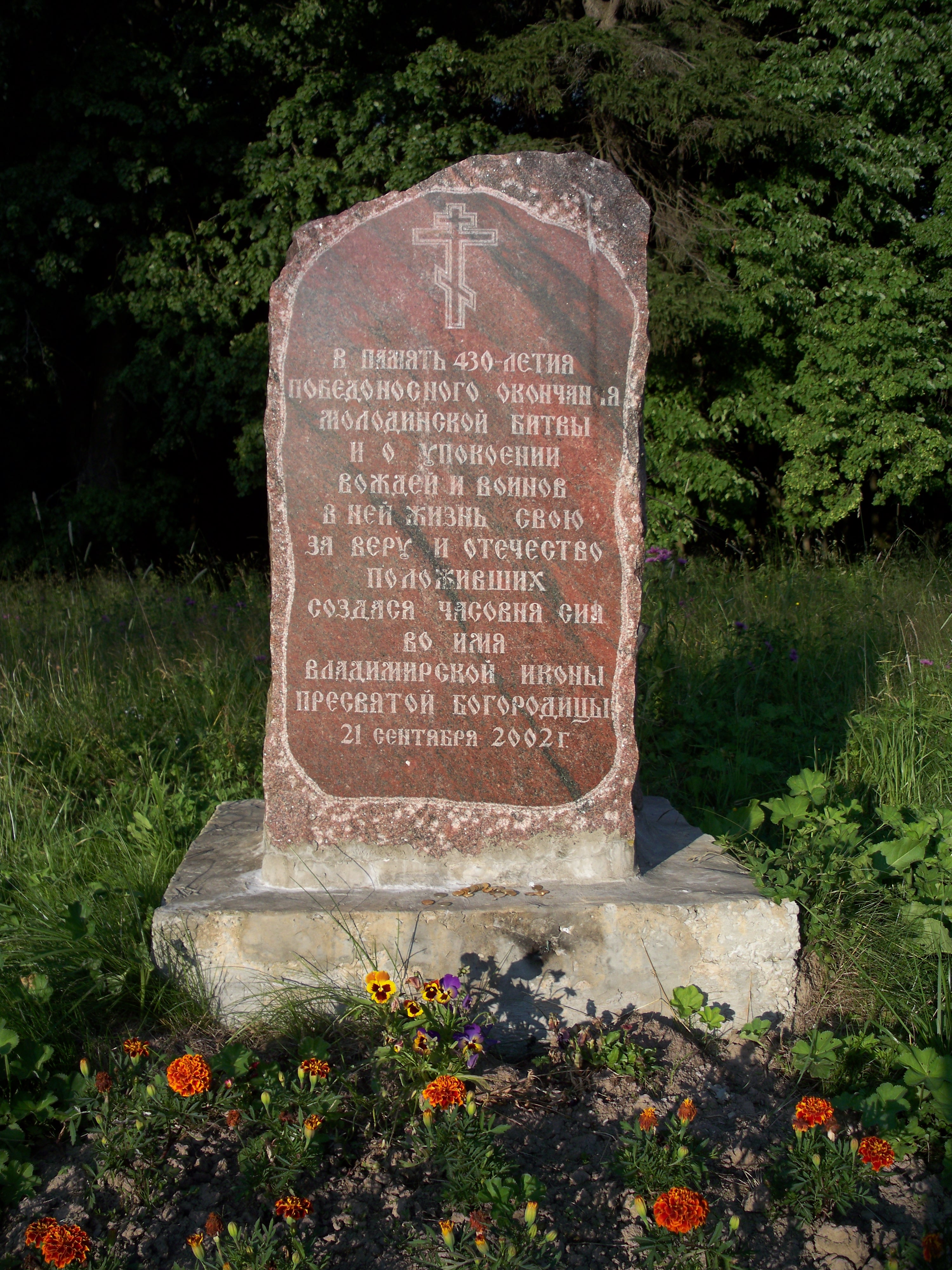
A foundation stone to commemorate the victory in the Battle of Molodi in 1572

== Order of battle ==
Based on contemporary documents, the Russian forces were as follows:

Group	Composition	Number
Main:	Regiment of Prince Mikhail Vorotynsky; Regiment of Ivan Vasilievich Sheremetev; Regiment of Prince Andrey Paletsky from Dedilov; Regiment of Prince Yuri Kurlyatev from Donkov; Regiments of Galician, Koryak, Kostroma and Balakhon; Strelets of the regiments of Osip Isupov and Mikhail Rzhevsky; Hired Cossacks of the regiments of Yuri Bulgakov and Ivan Fustov; German and Cossack mercenary regiments of Yuri Frantsbek, Yuryev and Rugodiv, Atalyk Kvashnin, the "Onikey children", Ignatiy Kobyakov and Yuri Tutolminus	1,840; 1,065; 350; 200; 1,430; 1,000; 1,000; 1,300
		Total: 8,255
Right Hand:	Regiment of Prince Nikita Romanovich Odoevsky; Regiment of Fyodor Vasilyevich Sheremetev; Regiment of Prince Grigory Dolgorukov; Strelets; Cossacks	1,225; 1,015; 350; 500; 500
		Total: 3,590
Forward:	Regiment of Prince Andrey Petrovich Khovansky; Regiment of Prince Dmitry Ivanovich Khvorostinin; Regiment of Prince Mikhail Lykov; Smolensk, Ryazan and Epifan archers; Cossacks; Vyatchane in strugs on the rivers	1,095; 2,040; 350; 535; 650; 900
		Total: 4,475
Guard:	Regiment of Prince Ivan Petrovich Shuisky; Regiment of Vasily Ivanovich Umnoy-Kolychev; Regiment of Prince Andrey Vasilyevich Repnin; Regiment of Peter Ivanovich Khvorostinin; Cossacks	956; 1,713; 766; 585; 650
		Total: 4,670
		Total: 20,034 and Mikhail Cherkashenin's Cossacks (3,000—5,000)

Contemporary chronicles give very large and unreliable figures when talking about the Tatar army. The Novgorod Second Chronicle gives its strength as 120,000 and the Moscow Chronicle about 150,000. According to modern Russian historians, the khan's army most likely numbered 40,000–60,000, of which two-thirds were the Crimean army proper, and the rest Nogai, Circassians and janissaries sent by the Ottoman Sultan.

The Russian historian Vitaly Pensky estimates the total size of the Moscow army at 35,000, considering that the remaining estimates are overstated.

== Sources ==
- Tucker, Spencer C., ed. (2010). "July 30-August 2, 1572: Eastern Europe: Russia: Battle of Molodi". A Global Chronology of Conflict: From the Ancient World to the Modern Middle East. Vol. II. ABC-CLIO.
- Roşu, Felicia (2021). Slavery In The Black Sea Region, C. 900– 1900. Chapter 8 (Maryna Kravets & Victor Ostapchuk). Brill. ISBN 978-9004470712.
