= Fire Emblem: Path of Radiance =

2005 video game

- North American cover art
- Developer: Intelligent Systems (Note: Co-produced and supervised by Nintendo Software Planning & Development)
- Publisher: Nintendo
- Director: Masayuki Horikawa
- Producers: Toru Narihiro; Hitoshi Yamagami
- Designers: Taeko Kaneda; Masahiro Higuchi
- Programmers: Takafumi Kaneko; Susumu Ishihara
- Artist: Senri Kita
- Writer: Ken Yokoyama
- Composers: Yoshito Hirano; Saki Haruyama; Naoko Mitome; Atsushi Yoshida; Kanako Teramae
- Series: Fire Emblem
- Platform: GameCube
- Release: JP: April 20, 2005; NA: October 17, 2005; EU: November 4, 2005; AU: December 1, 2005
- Genre: Tactical role-playing
- Mode: Single-player

Fire Emblem: Path of Radiance (Note: Known in Japan as Fire Emblem: Sōen no Kiseki (Japanese: ファイアーエムブレム 蒼炎の軌跡, Hepburn: Faiā Emuburemu: Sōen no Kiseki; lit. Fire Emblem: Trail of the Blue Flame)) is a 2005 tactical role-playing game developed by Intelligent Systems and Nintendo SPD, and published by Nintendo for the GameCube. It is the ninth main installment in the Fire Emblem series, (Note: Sources disagree on the exact numbering: it is variously called the 9th, and 10th entry in the series.) and the third to be released in the west. As with previous installments, gameplay revolves around positioning characters on a battlefield to defeat an opposing force. If characters are defeated in battle, they are removed from the rest of the game.

The story takes place on the fictional continent of Tellius, inhabited by the human Beorc and the shapeshifting Laguz. The game begins when the Beorc nation of Daein invades its neighbor, the kingdom of Crimea. The mercenary Ike and his companions set off to restore Crimea's heir, Princess Elincia, to the throne. The group travels across Tellius, allying with other countries to free Crimea from Daein's control and confronting racial tensions and long-standing resentment between the Beorc and the Laguz along the way.

Path of Radiance began development for the GameCube after the overseas success of the Game Boy Advance game Fire Emblem: The Blazing Blade, becoming the first home console entry in the series since Fire Emblem: Thracia 776. The game is the first entry in the series to feature 3D graphics, full motion cutscenes, and voice acting. The series' transition to 3D caused multiple difficulties for the developers. The localization team worked closely with Intelligent Systems to ensure the localization was as true to the original Japanese version as possible. Upon release, the game received generally positive reviews from critics for its gameplay and story, but it also received criticism for its graphics. A direct sequel for the Wii, Fire Emblem: Radiant Dawn, was released in 2007 in North America and Japan, and 2008 in Europe and Australia. Path of Radiance was later re-released for the Nintendo Classics service on January 9, 2026.

== Gameplay ==
A battle in Path of Radiance, with Ike and other characters confronting a group of enemies

Fire Emblem: Path of Radiance is a tactical role-playing video game in which players control protagonist Ike and a group of characters across multiple battle scenarios. At the game's opening, multiple difficulty settings can be chosen: in the Japanese version, the options are Normal, Hard, and Maniac modes, while the western version has Easy, Normal, and Hard modes. In all modes, characters who fall in battle are permanently dead and removed from the rest of the game. If Ike falls in battle, the game will end and the stage must be restarted.

Before entering battle, players can choose a certain number of characters to use from a roster of up to 46 characters. The roster grows as the game progresses and more characters are recruited, and the number of characters able to be used varied between battles. During battle, players have access to two species: the human Beorc and the shape-shifting Laguz. Beorc use weapons and magic, while Laguz use close-quarters melee attacks. Laguz have a gauge which fills up during battle, filling at varying speed depending on their status and whether they are under attack. When the gauge is full, they transform into their animal form for a set number of turns, becoming far more powerful than Beorc characters. However, they are unable to attack while in humanoid form, and are vulnerable until they transform again. The time between transformations can be shortened using special items. They are also weak to a certain type of magic: Beast Laguz are weak to fire, Dragon Laguz and classes with wyverns are weak to thunder and Bird Laguz are weak to wind, much like pegasi. Playable Beorc characters are each assigned a character class. These classes affect a character's skills and how far they can move on the battlefield. Some classes are exclusive to certain characters: for example, the Ranger class and its skills are exclusive to Ike. Laguz characters also have different movement speeds and strengths depending on their transformed form.

Character skills are additional abilities each character possesses. These classes can be tailored to a degree, with some skills available to award to any character, but skills inherent to a particular character cannot be removed or changed, and the amount of skills able to be awarded is restricted by the character's skill limit.

Characters used in battle gain experience points, with larger amounts of experience being awarded depending on a character's performance in battle. Bonus experience is awarded by fulfilling secondary requirements outlined at the beginning of the level. Once a character earns 100 experience points, they automatically level up. At level 21, a character's class is automatically upgraded. This upgrade can also happen at level 10 if the player uses an item called a Master Seal. Once the class changes, the character receives set stat bonuses, and their level is reset to level 1, while carrying over all the random stat increases aggregated up to that point. After promotion, the level-cap is 20, and no character can earn experience points after achieving this level.

Between battles, characters can be managed at a Base. In this location, skills can be assigned, weapons can be traded, purchased, and forged, and bonus experience points earned in battle can be given to characters. There is also a Support system accessible through the Base where player characters can talk with each other and improve their relationships. These conversations improve affinity between characters and grant stat boots in battle. Supports are ranked from C to A, with A being the highest rank and granting the best bonuses.

Battles take place on a grid-based map with multiple teams: the player team, the enemy team, allied characters, and neutral characters. A character's class (animal form for the Laguz) and the map's terrain can affect how far they can move and the range of their attacks. Gameplay is turn-based, with the player moving their characters during the player phase. Once the player's turn ends, the enemy phase begins. If allied or neutral characters are present, their phases will follow. During each phase, a character can move once and follow one command. Once this is done, the unit turns gray and cannot be moved or commanded until the next turn. Each turn can be ended manually by the player, or automatically when all characters are given their orders. The standard commands for characters include attacking characters, using items, rescuing characters (temporarily removing wounded characters from play at the cost of a stat-drain for the rescuing character), trading items with other allied characters, 'shoving' characters to an adjacent space, and waiting until a later turn to receive a command. Special commands include talking to characters in battle, opening chests, visiting buildings on the map, stealing items, and in some cases having characters escape from the map. If each character is not given a command, Ike has the exclusive ability to command all free characters, giving general orders to characters who have already moved for the next turn, or to unmoved characters for the current turn. If the level involves escaping the battle, Ike's escape will end the level.

The Fire Emblem series' Weapon Triangle mechanic is featured again, in which the three main close-combat weapons are strong or weak against each other: axes are strong against lances, lances are strong against swords, and swords are strong against axes. Other similar mechanics exist, such as fire magic being more damaging to some beasts, and arrows being more effective against airborne enemies. Weapon durability decreases over time, with weapons eventually breaking when used a certain number of times. Weapons have different levels of strength, with its assigned letter (E to A or S) denoting the level of skill required to wield it. Weapons forged at Base can also be customized with a unique name. Magic is governed by a similar system to the Weapons Triangle; fire is weak to wind, wind is weak to thunder, and thunder is weak to fire, while light magic, which is exclusive to bishops, is neutral.

== Synopsis ==
=== Setting and characters ===
As with previous Fire Emblem games, Path of Radiance takes place in a continuity and setting separate from the rest of the series. The game's setting is the continent of Tellius, inhabited by two species: the human Beorc, and the shape-shifting Laguz. According to legend, the goddess who made the world created Beorc in her image, and created the Laguz to fill the gap between herself and beasts. The two races have struggled to coexist, leading to racial tensions and conflict on both sides. By the events of Path of Radiance, Tellius is divided into seven nations which remain at peace. A key item in Tellius is Lehran's Medallion, the world's incarnation of the recurring Fire Emblem. It is a bronze medallion said to contain a dark deity who brought chaos to the world 800 years before and caused all the world but Tellius to be engulfed by the sea. To prevent the dark god from being freed, war must be prevented in Tellius.

There are 46 characters encountered through the story that can be recruited, each offering their own contribution to the story. Most of the main cast comes from the Greil Mercenaries group, led by its eponymous founder, Greil (Stephan Weyte/Takashi Nagasako). The protagonist is Ike (Jason Adkins/Michihiko Hagi), Greil's son. He is accompanied on his travels by Mist (Elsbeth Nathanson/Atsuko Enomoto), his sister, and Elincia (Erica Evans/Juri Takita), the lost heir to the Crimean throne. Other Beorc characters include Titania, a former knight of Crimea, Shinon, a master sniper, and Soren, a mage and tactician serving under Greil. The Laguz characters include Lethe, a cat Laguz with a strong hatred of Beorc; and Caineghis, the lion king of the beast Laguz who wishes for peaceful co-existence with the Beorc. The main antagonists are Daein generals called the Four Riders, which include the enigmatic Black Knight (Mark Dias/Junji Majima) and their master King Ashnard, the ruler of Daein.

=== Plot ===
Ike, a rookie mercenary, is allowed by his father Greil to fight in his band of mercenaries. While on a mission near the Crimean border, Ike rescues a woman named Elincia Ridell Crimea, the crown princess of Crimea who narrowly escaped being killed with her family after Daein launched a sudden invasion. Daein attacks the mercenaries shortly afterward, and they are forced to flee over the border into Gallia, a laguz nation. They are pursued by the Black Knight, who kills Greil in single combat before being driven off by the Gallians. Ike and Elincia decide to work together to drive the forces of Daein from Crimea. Gallia's king Caineghis is unable to help Elincia further, but directs them to seek aid from the powerful Begnion Empire. In Begnion, the empress Sanaki enlists Ike's aid in investigating and dismantling the illegal laguz slave trade. Ike's efforts lead to him rescuing the siblings Reyson and Leanne of the heron laguz clan, which was nearly annihilated in an act of genocide known as the Serenes Massacre perpetrated in retaliation for the assassination of the previous empress. Afterwards, Ike is knighted by Elincia and placed in command of the army opposed to Ashnard. Ike invades Daein, where he discovers that the medallion his sister Mist carries is in fact Lehran's Medallion. A dark deity was sealed inside the medallion eight hundred years prior, and Ashnard is provoking the war to try and release this deity using Daein's invasion as a template for his plan in the hopes of creating a social Darwinist meritocracy; Ike concludes that Ashnard orchestrated the Serenes Massacre in service to this goal. After conquering Daein, Ike and his mercenaries invade Crimea. Ike defeats the Black Knight in single combat, then slays Ashnard in a final assault on Crimea's capital, thwarting his scheme. With Ashnard defeated and the Daein occupation ended, Elincia is crowned as Crimea's new queen, who works to make the land a place where beorc and laguz can live in peace.

== Development ==
Development on Path of Radiance began at Intelligent Systems after the international success of the first localized game in the series, released overseas under the title Fire Emblem. Due to high development costs, the team had been unwilling to develop a title for the GameCube, but after Fire Emblem's success overseas, they decided to return from portable to home consoles for its next release. Nintendo SPD was also involved in development. Path of Radiance was the first Fire Emblem game to have 3D in-game graphics, full-motion video cutscenes and voice acting. It was also the first home console game since Fire Emblem: Thracia 776 for the Super Famicom. Transitioning from 2D graphics to 3D graphics was one of the biggest challenges during development, especially the transition from the tilted overhead view to a character-to-character battle in third-person. One of the features left out due to this process was a dedicated battle arena. At the same time, they introduced the base as members of the development team wanted a place where characters could interact separate from the battlefield. As there was no combat gameplay involved, other types of activity were created, such as special support conversations. To make moves in battle and cutscenes realistic, the team used motion capture, then made sure it appeared a little over the top so the fantasy feeling of the Fire Emblem series remained intact. By the end of development, Narihiro had some regrets about the quality of the game, saying in an interview that he considered it to be only 70% complete when released.

The character designs were done by Senri Kita, an artist new to the series. In contrast to previous Fire Emblem games, where the protagonist was of royal blood, the main character Ike was intended to be of lower social rank, a mercenary who becomes involved in royal politics and conflict rather than being born into it. Ike was born from the many ideas for new directions being suggested for the new 3D game, with many people wanting the protagonist everyone could empathize with. His status as a mercenary was a highly requested character trait by male staff. A character archetype that returned from previous games was Jeigan, who was this time designed as a female character named Titania. Designing all the characters to be unique under the new conditions proved a challenge. This also resulted in higher-quality character artwork being produced during the initial design stages. The full-motion videos were created by Japanese animation studio Digital Frontier. Introducing the cutscenes into the game proved challenging for the team. The game's subtitle does not refer to a specific object or place, but instead acts as a metaphor for the journeys of Ike and other characters.

== Release ==
A new Fire Emblem title was first announced in April 2004, with the full reveal coming in an issue of Weekly Shōnen Jump. The game's title, story details and chosen platform were announced in Weekly Shōnen Jump, with a release date announced as some time during 2004. The game was first shown publicly by Nintendo at their Nintendo World Touch DS event in early 2005. The version of the game displayed there was an early model, and between its reveal and release, it underwent some changes to improve the usability and quality. As a pre-order bonus, Nintendo created a special CD containing selected tracks from the game, and a special calendar commemorating the series' 15th anniversary. The game released in Japan on April 20, 2005.

The first western demonstration of the title was at E3 2005. It was the third Fire Emblem title to be localized, after Fire Emblem and The Sacred Stones. Players with save data from the Game Boy Advance Fire Emblem games are able to connect with Path of Radiance and access concept art and special maps revolving around characters from those games. Path of Radiance released in North America on October 17. It was subsequently released in Europe on November 4; and in Australia on December 1.

=== Localization ===
The localization of Path of Radiance was handled by Nintendo of America's localization branch Nintendo Treehouse. During the process, the team worked closely with Intelligent Systems staff members. The biggest challenge for the team was translating from Japanese to English, which required staff from Japan to come over and check their work. When translating the dialogue, the localization team wanted to preserve the story's depth and serious tone, despite often having a limited text and character space for interaction and expression. While they had the option to add extra text boxes, this would potentially have made going through conversations tedious for players, so they worked to match the number of text boxes used in the Japanese version. The western version's difficulty was also toned down: the Japanese version's Maniac setting was removed, Hard Mode was toned down, and a new Easy was introduced. These adjustments were based on both western test player feedback, and feedback from Japanese players complaining about the game's high difficulty.

The amount of dialogue and text that needed translating was estimated at less than that in Animal Crossing, but still enough to take several months to complete. Due to its serious nature, the team needed to take a different approach to its localization than other Nintendo titles. As far as possible, the team remained faithful to the original script, aside from pieces like jokes which would not have made sense to people unfamiliar with Japanese humor. While most of the time they refrained from putting out-of-context remarks in character dialogue, an exception was Anna, a recurring Fire Emblem character who featured in optional tutorial missions. As she existed outside the game to a degree, they had more freedom to have her make pop culture references.

== Reception ==
Reception

Aggregate score
Aggregator	Score
Metacritic	85/100 (42 reviews)

Review scores
Publication	Score
1Up.com	B+
Eurogamer	8/10
Famitsu	34/40
GameSpot	8.6/10
IGN	8.7/10
Nintendo World Report	9.5/10
RPGamer	4.5/5
RPGFan	85%

In Japan during its opening week, Path of Radiance sold 100,357 copies, selling through 64.16% of its initial shipment. By the end of 2005, the game had sold 156,413 copies. In its UK debut, it reached the top of the GameCube charts. Although no exact sales figures have been published, Nintendo identified the game as being among its successful GameCube titles for 2005. According to the developers, the fact that it was released near the end of the GameCube's lifespan affected sales, but it still managed to help sell the hardware and convinced Nintendo that the Fire Emblem series had selling power on home consoles.

Reception of the game was generally positive: on aggregate site Metacritic, it received a score of 85/100 based upon 42 critic reviews. In IGN's GamerMetrics List for 2005 and GameSpot's 2005 Readers' Choice award, Path of Radiance was at #2 in their respective lists behind Resident Evil 4. The game was among those nominated at the 2006 Golden Joystick Awards in the "Nintendo Game of the Year" category. The game was named by GamesRadar was one of the best GameCube games of all time in 2014, and Destructoid listed it among the five best Fire Emblem games in the series in 2013. During the 9th Annual Interactive Achievement Awards, the Academy of Interactive Arts & Sciences nominated Path of Radiance for "Role-Playing Game of the Year", which was ultimately awarded to Jade Empire.

Famitsu's reviewers each praised the gameplay, story, and the introduction of full-motion movies. One reviewer cited it as the series' new exemplar, while another pointed out rough edges in the graphical redesign and that the new 3D perspective made seeing some parts of the map difficult. 1UP.com's Shane Betternhausen was positive overall, saying "[Path of Radiance] delivers a superbly paced and rewarding adventure". RPGamer's Chris Privitere said "While Fire Emblem: Path of Radiance doesn't necessarily add anything new to the tactical genre, it does everything very well", recommending it to players while stressing the need for patience. Peer Schneider of IGN called the game "yet another worthy installment in Intelligent Systems' venerable strategy RPG series". RPGFan reviewer Mark Tjan said that while not the best Fire Emblem game he had played, "it's certainly a good game and worth picking up if you're searching for an SRPG worth your time and money". Nintendo World Report's Karl Castaneda was also highly positive, though commenting that its graphical quality were more suited to the early days of the GameCube's life and that it might have been a great success if released during that period. Eurogamer's Tom Bramwell, despite feeling that the game was flawed by inherent problems in the Fire Emblem formula, enjoyed the game and was willing to replay once he had finished. Greg Kasavin, writing for GameSpot, saying that "by replacing the traditional random battles that typify most Japanese role-playing games with a fun and exciting turn-based combat system, and by going out of its way to deliver a memorable and genuinely emotional story, Fire Emblem: Path of Radiance accomplishes what all role-playing games attempt, but very few actually manage to do". The majority of praise went to the game's story and gameplay, while criticism was focused on the graphical quality.

== Legacy ==
The team's successful return to a home console convinced them to carry on the story of Tellius in another home console release. The next entry, Fire Emblem: Radiant Dawn, began development in May 2005 for the Wii. It was released in 2007 in Japan and North America, and 2008 in Europe and Australia. The protagonist Ike has also appeared as a playable fighter in all installments of the Super Smash Bros. series since Super Smash Bros. Brawl.
