= Crimea (WWII game) =

1977 WWII board wargame

Cover of the rulebook, 1977

Crimea is a board wargame published by Excalibre Games in 1977 that simulates the Crimean Campaign during World War II.

== Background ==
In the summer of 1941, during Germany's surprise invasion of the Soviet Union, Axis forces attempted to invade the Crimean Peninsula and take Sevastopol, but were stopped by stiff Soviet resistance. The subsequent campaign would take eight months and result in thousands of casualties on both sides.

== Description ==
Crimea is a two-player board wargame where one player controls the Axis invaders and the other player controls the Soviet defenders. With only six pages of rules and 100 counters, the game has been characterized as "a short, simple treatment."

=== Gameplay ===
The game uses an alternating "I Go, You Go" system where one player moves and attacks, then the other player moves and attacks. This completes one game turn.

Axis units are subject to step-reduction (each unit takes several "hits" before it is eliminated), but Soviet units are eliminated on the first "hit". Russian units can make amphibious assaults, but Axis units are solely land-based. Artillery has a range of two hexes. Armored units are stronger than infantry units, but otherwise operate identically in terms of movement. Units must stop when entering an enemy zone of control, but combat is not mandatory.

== Publication history ==
Excalibre Games published a number of relatively uncomplicated ziplock bag games in their World War II series "Panzer Battles and Sieges." One of these was Crimea, designed by R. J. Hlavnicka and Dennis O'Leary, and published in 1977.

== Reception ==
In Issue 50 of Moves, Steve List noted "The rules seem adequately written, but are distressingly casual in places."

In The Guide to Simulations/Games for Education and Training, Martin Campion evaluated this game as an educational aid for students in Grade 8 and up, calling it "a good game for take-home assignments since it has few complexities to confuse beginning players and is at least suggestive of the actual campaign."

== Other reviews and commentary ==
- Campaign #82
