= Crimea Medal (disambiguation) =

Crimea medal may refer to:

- Crimea Medal (1854), a British campaign medal
- Turkish Crimea Medal (1856), an Ottoman campaign medal
- Medal for the Return of Crimea (2014), a Russian campaign medal

== See also ==
- Crimea (disambiguation)
- Medal (disambiguation)
