= John Michael Crim =

Maltese businessman

John Michael "Red" Crim is a Maltese businessman who, in 2008, was convicted in Philadelphia with two associates of a plot to cheat the American Internal Revenue Service out of approximately $10m in tax revenue.

Crim resides in Malta. He was convicted of providing others with a tool to use in cheating the US government out of tax money. The corporations that Crim created was used by others to commit unlawful acts. Crim had no direct involvement with clients' taxes. Read the story in book called "From Here to Malta".

== See also ==
- Wesley Snipes
