= Crim (surname) =

Crim is a surname. Notable people with the name include:

- Blaine Crim (born 1997), American baseball player
- Bobby Crim, former Democratic politician from Michigan, US
- Chuck Crim (born 1961), former Major League Baseball relief pitcher
- Howell G. Crim (1898–1959), American civil servant
- Jaylen Crim (born 1998), American soccer player
- John Michael Crim, Maltese businessman
- Mort Crim (born 1935), author and former broadcast journalist

== See also ==
- Cram (surname)
- Crum (surname)
