= Crimean campaign (1646) =

Military campaign against the Crimean Khanate by the Tsardom of Russia

- Part of Russo-Crimean Wars and Russo-Turkish Wars
Date	June–September 1646
Location	Rostov Oblast, Russia
Result	Crimean–Ottoman victory

Belligerents
Crimean Khanate; Ottoman Empire	Tsardom of Russia; Don Cossacks

Commanders and leaders
Nuraddin Gazi Giray	(Russia) Z. V. Kondyrev (Russia) Semeon Romanovich Pozharskii

Strength
10,000 men	3,000 Cossack volunteers 1,700 Russians; 2,000 Nogais; 10,000 additional volunteers

Casualties and losses
Unknown	Heavy

The Crimean campaign of 1646 was a military campaign launched by the Tsardom of Russia against the Crimean Khanate that took place in the summer of 1646 and ended in failure.

== Prelude ==
In the year 1646, the Russians prepared a military expedition to attack the Crimean Khanate. Two armies were dispatched: one was led by Z. V. Kondyrev, consisting of 3,000 Cossack volunteers who were recruited from Voronezh, and a second force was led by Semeon Romanovich Pozharskii, consisting of 1,700 Russians and 2,000 Nogais. The former commander was given command of the expedition and gave orders to his men not to attack the Ottoman fortress of Azov and to obey his and Pozharskii's orders. Before the expedition was launched, Kondyrev recruited an additional 10,000 men, mainly peasants and garrison deserters seeking to join the Cossacks.

== Campaign ==
As the campaign was marching against the Crimeans, the additional force began disrupting the farms and the supplies provided by garrison, which led to the Russian government to dispatch a supply flotilla so that they can feed the army, but this proved not enough. To make matters worse, a Starshina decided to desert Kondyrev's army in June and recruited a force of 500 men to attack Azov. They attacked the fort at night, but they were repulsed. While also attacking Ottoman ships, the Russians planned to raid the coasts of Crimea, but due to storms and shortages of supplies, nothing came of these plans. The second army, led by Pozharskii, achieved some success by attacking Crimean encampments; however, in August, they met a Crimean force of 10,000 men led by the Nuraddin Gazi Giray and were defeated near Kagal'nik. In September, Kondyrev's men began deserting due to hunger and demoralization, by then he had a remaining force of 2,000 men until he was recalled back to Moscow.

== Bibliography ==
- Brian Davies, Warfare, State and Society on the Black Sea Steppe, 1500 1700 (Warfare and History).
- Сергей Михайлович Соловьев, History of Russia, Vol XVIII, p. 114
