= Krymsky, Republic of Bashkortostan =

Krymsky Крымский
- Selo
- Location within Bashkortostan Location within Russia
- Coordinates: 54°03′N 55°13′E
- Country: Russia
- Region: Bashkortostan
- District: Alsheyevsky District
- Time zone: UTC+5:00

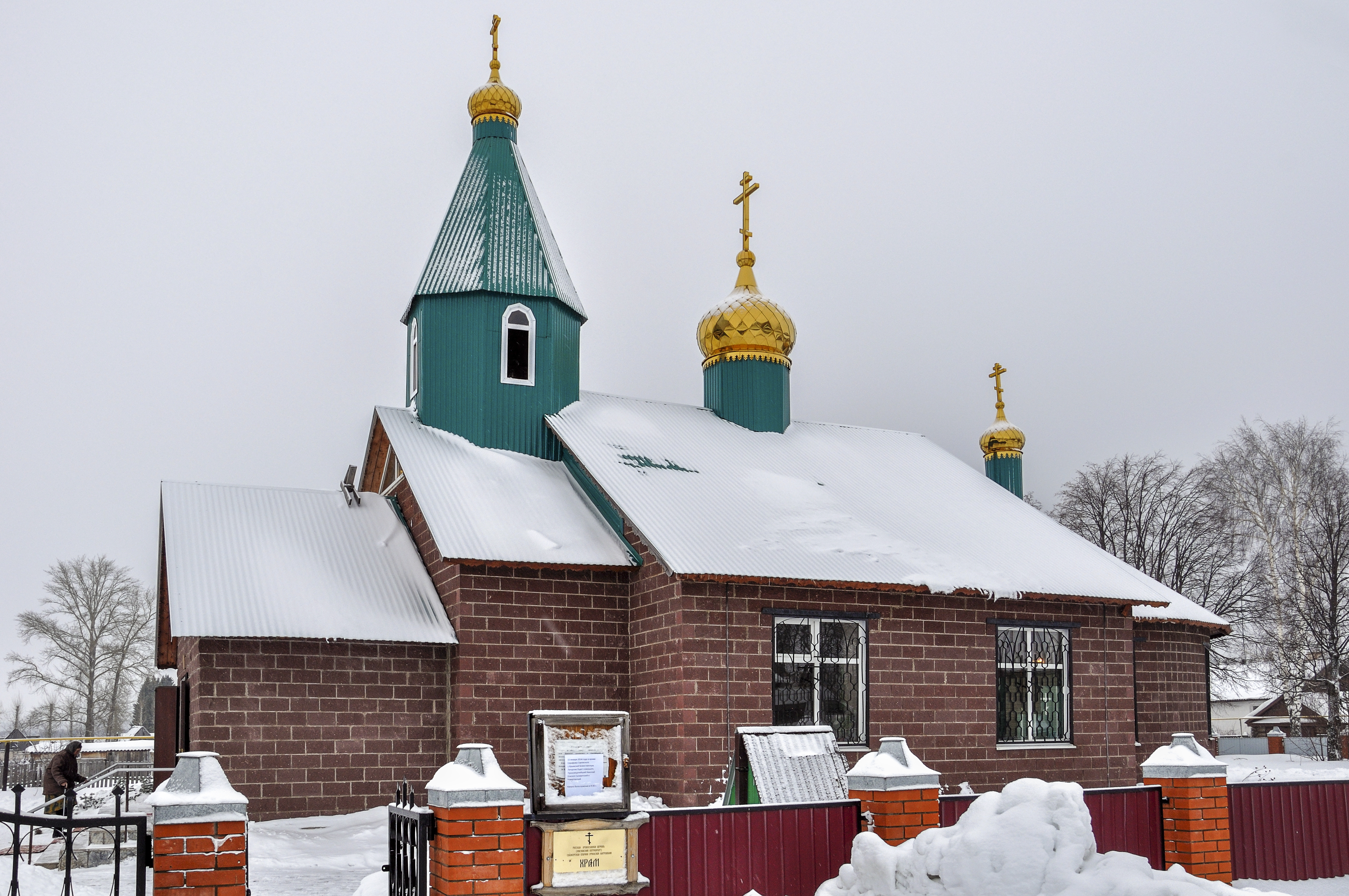
Temple in the village of Krymskoye, Alsheevsky district of the Republic of Bashkortostan

Krymsky (Russian: Крымский; Bashkir: Ҡырым, Qırım) is a rural locality (a selo) in Abdrashitovsky Selsoviet, Alsheyevsky District, Bashkortostan, Russia. The population was 529 as of 2010. There are 8 streets.

== Geography ==
Krymsky is located 24 km east of Rayevsky (the district's administrative centre) by road. Maloabdrashitovo is the nearest rural locality.
