= Russo-Crimean Wars =

Conflicts between the Tsardom of Russia and the Crimean Khanate in the 16th century

The Russo-Crimean Wars were fought between the forces of the Tsardom of Russia and the Crimean Khanate during the 16th century over the region around the Volga River.

In the 16th century, the Wild Steppes in Russia were exposed to the Khanate. During the wars, the Crimean Khanate (supported by the Ottoman army) invaded central Russia, devastated Ryazan, and burned Moscow. However, the next year they were defeated in the Battle of Molodi. Despite the defeat, the raids continued. As a result, the Crimean Khanate was invaded several times, and conquered in the late 18th century. The Tatars eventually lost their influence in the regions.

The raids began shortly after the establishment of the Russian buffer state, Qasim Khanate, and the domination of Russia in the Russo-Kazan Wars of the late 15th century.

== History ==
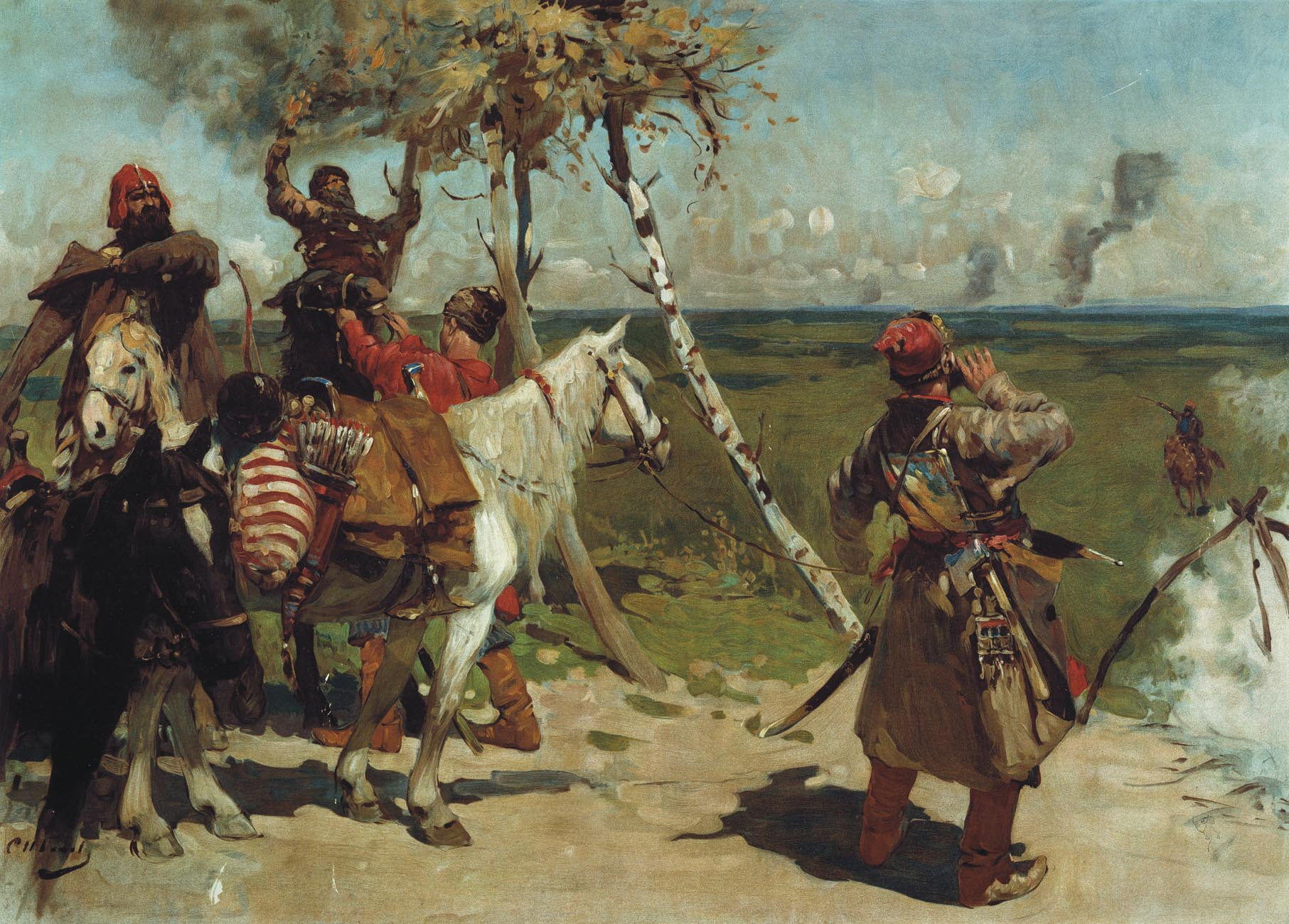
At the guarding border of the Moscow state. Painting by Sergey Vasilievich Ivanov.

The Crimean invasions of Russia began in 1507, after the death of Moscow's grand duke Ivan III, with the Crimean Khanate attacking the Russian towns of Belev and Kozelsk.

Over the course of the 16th century, the outer border of the Wild Steppes was near the city of Ryazan, outside the Oka River. The main path for the invading forces to Moscow was the Muravsky Trail, running from the Crimean Isthmus of Perekop, between the basins of the Dnieper and Seversky Donets rivers, and finally up to Tula. The Tatars would turn back only after extensive looting and kidnapping, the Tartars usually managed to penetrate 100–200 kilometers into Russian territory. Captives were subsequently sent to the Crimean city of Caffa to be sold into the Crimean slave trade. As a result, the Russian population in the border regions suffered heavily.

Each spring, Russia mobilized up to several thousand soldiers for border service. The defensive lines consisted of a circuit of fortresses and cities.

To protect from invasions by the Nogai Horde in the region between the Volga and Ural rivers, the Volga cities of Samara (1586), Tsaritsyn (1589), and Saratov (1590) were founded.

The most damaging invasions occurred in 1517, 1521 (supported by the Khanate of Kazan), 1537 (supported by the Khanate of Kazan, the Lithuanians, and the Ottoman Empire), 1552, 1555, 1570–72 (supported by Sweden and the Ottoman Empire), 1589, 1593, 1640, 1666–67 (supported by Poland–Lithuania), 1671, and 1688.

== Russo-Crimean wars of 1571–1572 ==
=== Fire of Moscow (1571) ===
In May 1571, the 60,000-strong Crimean and Ottoman army (40,000 Tatars, 13,000 irregular Turks, and 7,000 janissaries) led by the khan of Crimea Devlet I Giray, and Big and Small Nogai hordes and troops of Circassians, bypassed the Serpukhov defensive fortifications on the Oka River, crossed the Ugra River, and rounded the flank of the 6,000-man Russian army. The sentry troops of Russians were crushed by the Crimeans. Not having forces to stop the invasion, the Russian army retreated to Moscow. The rural Russian population also fled to the capital.

The Crimean army devastated unprotected towns and villages around Moscow, and then set fire to suburbs of the capital. Due to a strong wind, the fire quickly expanded. The townspeople, chased by a fire and refugees, rushed to the northern gate of the capital. At the gate and in the narrow streets, there was a crush, people "went in three lines went on heads one of another, and top pressed those who were under them". The army, having mixed up with refugees, lost order, and general prince Belsky died in a fire.

Within three hours, Moscow burnt completely. In one more day, the Crimean army, sated with its pillage, left on the Ryazan road to the steppes. Contemporaries counted up to 80,000 victims of the invasion in 1571, with 150,000 Russian taken as captives. Papal ambassador Possevin testified of the devastation: he counted in 1580 no more than 30,000 inhabitants of Moscow, although in 1520 the Moscow population was about 100,000.

=== Battle of Molodi (1572) ===
After the burning of Moscow, Devlet Giray Khan, supported by the Ottoman Empire, invaded Russia again in 1572. On 26 July 1572 the huge horde of the khan, equipped with cannons and reinforced by janissaries, crossed the Oka River near Serpukhov, decimated the Russian vanguard of 200 men, and advanced towards Moscow in order to pillage it once again. Little did they know, however, that the Russians had prepared for the second invasion, setting up innovative fortifications just beyond the Oka river. The Cirmean Tatars were this time repelled. After the battle, only 20,000 Tatar horsemen returned to the Crimea, while the khan left his tent and banner on the battlefield and barely managed to escape alive.

== After 1572 ==
Despite the defeat of the Crimean Tatars at Molodi, the raids against Russia continued until the Russo-Turkish War of 1768–1774. The Russian expansion turned to the Black Sea region and the Crimean Khanate was invaded several times in the 18th century and finally annexed in 1783.

== Incomplete list of Tatar raids ==
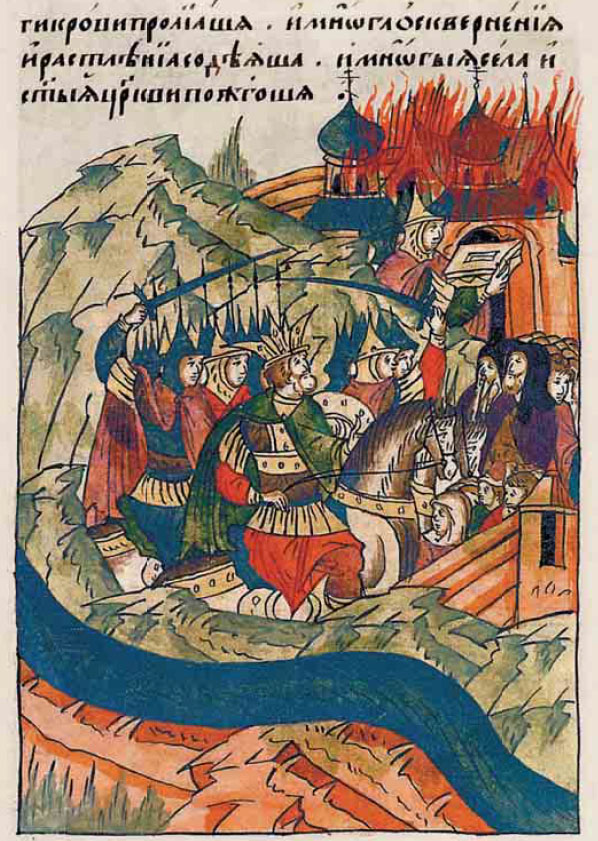
Tatar invasion of Russia in 1521

This list does not include raids into Poland-Lithuania (75 raids during 1474–1569)

- 1507: defeat of the Crimeans who marched on Moscow.
- 1507 and 1514: the raids led by Tatar nobles, avoiding a peace agreement held by the Khan.
- 1517: unsuccessful Crimean raid into Russia, upon arrival, the Crimeans lose 15,000 people.
- 1521: Khan and 50,000 men cross the Oka at Kolomna and ravage outskirts of Moscow for 2 weeks.
- 1521: the unsuccessful Siege of Pereyaslavl-Ryazansky by the Crimean troops; after the defeat at Pereyaslavl-Ryazansky (Ryazan), the Crimean troops leave Russia.
- c. 1533: Abatis defense line about 100 km south of the Oka.
- 1533–1547 (regency for Ivan IV): some 20 large raids on the frontiers.
- 1541: Crimean Khan crosses the Oka river on rafts under covering fire from Turkish guns.
- 1552: Crimean campaign of Tula.
- 1555: the defeat of 60,000 troops of the Crimean Khanate in Battle of Sudbischi.
- 1562, 1564, 1565: the khan lead a large army into Muscovy.
- 1559: the Russians are ravaging the north of the Crimean Khanate and they are being released those who were taken into slavery.
- 1556–1559: the Russians and Zaporozhians raid the Black Sea coast four times.
- 1564: the city of Ryazan posad was burned.
- 1570: Russo-Turkish War (1568–1570)
- 1571: Russo-Crimean War (1571)
- 1572: Battle of Molodi
- 1575: Ivan IV requests Zaporozhian Ataman Ruzhynsky to launch Crimean Campaign.
- 1591: the defeat of the Crimean troops near Moscow, this was the last campaign in which the Crimean troops reached Moscow.
- 1598: the Crimeans stopped by Bank Line, withdraw and sue for peace.
- 1614: Nogai raids within sight of Moscow. During the Time of Troubles so many captives were taken that the price of a slave at Kaffa dropped to fifteen or twenty gold pieces.
- 1618: Nogais release 15,000 captives in peace treaty with Moscow.
- 1632: force from Livny ambushed by Tatars and Janissaries (sic). 300 killed and the rest enslaved.
- 1632: 20,000 Tatars raid the south, as troops were shifted north for the Smolensk War.
- 1633: 30,000 Tatars cross Abatis and Bank lines. Thousands were captured from Oka region. This was the last deep raid into Russia.
- 1635: many small war parties invaded Russia south of Ryazan.
- 1637, 1641–1643: several raids were led by Nogais and Crimean nobles without permission of Khan.
- 1643: 600 Tatars and 200 Zaporozhian Cossacks (sic) raid Kozlov. 19 were killed, and 262 were captured.
- 1644: 20,000 Tatars raid southern Russia, 10,000 captives.
- 1645: a raid captures 6,000 captives. It is claimed that the Turks encouraged these raids to obtain galley slaves for a war with Venice.
- 1646: the Russians invade Crimean peninsula.
- c. 1650: the Belgorod Line pushes Russian forts 300 km south of the Abatis Line.
- 1663: Siege of Perekop.
- 1675: 1675 Crimean Campaign.
- c. 1680: Izium line: Russian forts were built within 150 kilometers of the Black Sea.
- 1687, 1689: Crimean campaigns: attempt to invade Crimea fails.
- 1691–92: several thousand captured near the Izium Line.
- 1769: a winter raid into New Serbia; several thousand were captured.
- 1774: Crimea became a Russian vassal.
- 1783: Crimea annexed by Russia.

== Sources ==
- Vasily Klyuchevsky, The Course of Russian History, Vol. 2.
- http://www.kulichki.com/moshkow/HISTORY/ANDREEW_A_R/krym_history.txt
- The Full Collection of Russian Annals. The Patriarchal Annals, vol.13, Moscow. 1965
