= Fire Emblem: Radiant Dawn =

2007 video game

- North American version cover art
- Developer: Intelligent Systems
- Publisher: Nintendo
- Director: Taeko Kaneda
- Producers: Toru Narihiro; Hitoshi Yamagami
- Designers: Sachiko Wada; Toyohisa Tanabe; Yoshimasa Arita; Ryuichiro Koguchi; Yoshihisa Isa; Shingo Igata
- Programmer: Takashi Akiyama
- Artists: Senri Kita; Masahiro Higuchi
- Writer: Ken Yokoyama
- Composers: Yoshito Hirano; Chika Sekigawa; Naoko Mitome
- Series: Fire Emblem
- Platform: Wii
- Release: JP: February 22, 2007; NA: November 5, 2007; EU: March 14, 2008; AU: April 10, 2008
- Genre: Tactical role-playing game
- Mode: Single-player

Fire Emblem: Radiant Dawn (Note: Known in Japan as Fire Emblem: Akatsuki no Megami (Japanese: ファイアーエムブレム 暁の女神, Hepburn: Faiā Emuburemu: Akatsuki no Megami; lit. Fire Emblem: The Goddess of Dawn)) is a tactical role-playing game developed by Intelligent Systems and published by Nintendo for the Wii home console. It is the tenth entry in the Fire Emblem series, (Note: Sources disagree on the exact numbering: it is variously called the 10th, and 11th entry in the series.) and acts as a direct sequel to the 2005 GameCube title Fire Emblem: Path of Radiance. It was released in 2007 in Japan and North America, and 2008 in Europe and Australia.

Radiant Dawn's plot begins in the war-torn nation of Daein with the main character Micaiah and her allies, the Dawn Brigade, rebelling against the oppressive Begnion Occupational Army. The story is divided into four parts, and changes perspective between different factions within the continent of Tellius. The gameplay is similar to Path of Radiance and previous Fire Emblem titles, with units moving across a grid-based map in turn-based battles, and characters unrelated to the core plot being subject to permanent death if defeated.

Radiant Dawn began development in 2005 for the Wii after the success of Path of Radiance. Continuing the trend of developing for home consoles after a period on portable devices, it was intended to be released close to the Wii hardware's release so as to boost sales for both game and hardware. Radiant Dawn received generally positive reviews, with critics praising the core gameplay, although its lack of motion controls, high difficulty, and changes to support conversations were criticized.

== Gameplay ==
A battle in Radiant Dawn

Radiant Dawn retains the gameplay mechanics of Fire Emblem: Path of Radiance, with turn-based battles taking place on a square-based grid. Most of the Path of Radiance cast returns, including all of its playable characters (except Largo), as well as figures new to Tellius. Data from a completed Path of Radiance save file can be transferred to Radiant Dawn via a Nintendo GameCube memory card, which can lead to characters obtaining statistical gains. Support conversations from Path of Radiance can also be accessed and viewed using this method. In Radiant Dawn, the "support" system has been altered so that a unit can support any other unit, although units can only have one support relationship each. A secondary support known as a "bond" is also available, which is active by default or obtained when two units have attained an "A" support level in Path of Radiance.

Radiant Dawn's multifaceted plot and lack of a permanent main character leads to the player controlling different factions in the game. In the later stages of the game, the player's units will battle against a previously playable set of enemy units; despite the "permanent death" feature common to the Fire Emblem series, some partner units and previously playable enemy units defeated in battle will still be playable later in the game. Radiant Dawn introduced new features relating to unit development, such as double promotion for beorcs, which grants the unit a special skill dependent on the unit's class. New features have also been added to the laguz units, including a maximum level increased to 40, the ability to fight untransformed, and the presence of the wolf laguz.

There are also modifications to combat, including an elevation advantage which grants units at a greater altitude with more power and accuracy. Radiant Dawn introduces the highest level of weaponry, known as "SS", which requires a unit to have used a particular weapon type many times. In previous Fire Emblem games, archers could not attack adjacent units, but the crossbow, as well as a few other bows, allows such units to attack both adjacent and distant units. Dark magic, omitted from Path of Radiance but present in earlier games, was reintroduced to form a second magical trinity (akin to the rock-paper-scissors system) alongside the one in Path of Radiance: Dark magic is strong against Anima magic (fire, lightning, and wind), Anima is strong against Light magic, and Light magic is strong against Dark magic.

== Plot ==
Radiant Dawn is divided into four parts, each of which begins with a prologue chapter that introduces the situation, followed by a series of chapters that is resolved with an "Endgame" chapter.

Three years after the Mad King's War, (Note: As depicted in Fire Emblem: Path of Radiance (2005).) Daein, the war's instigator and eventual loser, and the victorious nation Crimea are still in the process of rebuilding. Although Crimea is ruled by Queen Elincia, Daein lacks a proper successor and is instead ruled by the corrupt and oppressive occupation forces of the Begnion Empire. A group of Daein rebels named the Dawn Brigade, headed by Micaiah and Sothe, act as vigilantes to provide some measure of hope against the oppressors. After being driven from the capital, the Dawn Brigade flees into the northern desert. There they encounter the heron prince Rafiel and the wolf laguz queen Nailah, whose people have not been seen in Tellius for millennia. Soon after, the Dawn Brigade locates and allies with the late King Ashnard's orphan son Pelleas, his scheming and ruthless adviser Izuka, and the former general of Daein known as the Black Knight. The group launches a guerrilla war against the occupation army, liberating former soldiers of Daein from prison camps and gaining the loyalty of the people. Micaiah's efforts become legendary during these campaigns, with the people of Daein dubbing her the "Silver-Haired Maiden." Word of the plight of the Daein people eventually reaches Empress Sanaki of Begnion, who sends her trusted advisor Sephiran to Daein to rein in the occupation army. The senate disavows and scapegoats occupation leader General Jarod, who is overthrown and killed by the liberation army in an assault on the capital. Unbeknownst to them all, Izuka tricks Pelleas into signing a contract known as a blood pact with the head of the Begnion senate, Lekain, which will kill increasingly large numbers of Daein citizens when triggered.

Word of Pelleas' ascension reaches Crimea, and Queen Elincia's recognition of Pelleas as Daein's rightful ruler outrages the Crimean nobility. Fear that Crimea's hated enemy is rebuilding creates discontent throughout all levels of Crimean society. A Crimean noble named Ludveck takes advantage of the tension to organize a rebellion in order to claim Crimea for himself. Alerted to Ludveck's plan, the Crimean Royal Knights attack and capture Ludveck's castle. However, this is a diversion, and Ludveck's troops attack Elincia at Fort Alpea, but they are repelled and Ludveck is captured. He attempts to force Elincia to release him by holding her friend Lucia hostage, but she is rescued by Ike and the Greil Mercenaries. Before Ike leaves, Elincia reveals the Black Knight's return in Daein.

When Ike returns to his headquarters, he is hired by the Laguz Alliance, consisting of the hawk nation of Phoenicis, the raven nation of Kilvas, and the beast nation of Gallia. Their representative, Ranulf, explains that Rafiel has revealed that the Begnion senate was responsible for assassinating the previous apostle of Begnion and framing the heron clans for it, resulting in their near annihilation. This has led to the Laguz Alliance declaring war on Begnion. Ike leads the Alliance into battle against the Begnion forces, commanded by the veteran general Zelgius. The situation quickly escalates, threatening to become a world war that will awaken the god of chaos Yune who will supposedly destroy the world. Begnion coerces Daein into joining the war on their side with the blood pact and uses another blood pact to force Kilvas to betray the Laguz Alliance. Pelleas asks Micaiah to kill him to free Daein from the blood pact, but even if she does, it simply results in the blood pact transferring to her. Nailah and Prince Kurthnaga of the dragon nation of Goldoa learn of Daein's plight and also side with them. Meanwhile, Begnion begins raiding Crimean villages for supplies, drawing Crimea into the conflict on the Laguz Alliance's side, and Empress Sanaki escapes the senate's clutches and joins the Alliance along with the faction of Begnion soldiers loyal to her. A massive battle ensues, and the chaos begins to awaken Yune; Micaiah is forced to prematurely awaken her with the galdr of release. Yune's awakening also awakens the goddess of order Ashera.

As punishment for bringing the world into chaos, Ashera subsequently petrifies Tellius; only the most powerful warriors and human-laguz half-breeds survive. She decides that humankind is unworthy of survival and must be eradicated, and recruits the Begnion senate to this end. Guided by Yune, who sides with humanity, Ike, Micaiah, and King Tibarn of Phoenicis lead three groups in an assault on the Tower of Guidance where Ashera lies. Their journey brings about several revelations about the world and the previous conflicts. Ranulf reveals that the Black Knight's true identity is Zelgius; if Pelleas survived, Izuka reveals that he was not Ashnard's son, but an unwitting dupe used to place Daein further under Begnion's thumb (his real son is Soren, Ike’s tactician); Yune reveals that the old claim that human-laguz half-breeds are a crime against the goddess and the subsequent persecution against them are based on a lie. In the Tower of Guidance, the group kills the corrupt Begnion senators and frees Daein and Kilvas from the blood pacts while Ike defeats Zelgius in a duel to the death. At the entrance to Ashera's chambers, the group encounters Sephiran, who reveals himself to be the ancient heron Lehran. Sephiran admits that the massacre of the heron clans destroyed his faith in humanity, and that he has since engineered both the Mad King's War and the Laguz-Begnion conflict in order to destroy the world. After defeating him, Yune empowers Ike with godlike power, and he defeats Ashera and restores peace to Tellius.

In the aftermath, Micaiah learns that she is Sanaki's long-lost and presumed-dead older sister, but leaves to take the throne of Daein with the approval of Pelleas (if he survived) and the Daein citizenry. Ike departs the continent and is never seen again. Hundreds of years later, Yune and Ashera combine to again become the goddess Ashunera, creator of Tellius. On a second playthrough onward, Lehran can be spared and redeemed; in this case, he greets Ashunera and reveals that the continent is once again about to go to war, and Ashunera resolves to protect the people.

== Development ==
By 2005, when Radiant Dawn's predecessor Path of Radiance was released, the Fire Emblem series had successfully established itself overseas first with the release of Fire Emblem for the Game Boy Advance and then Path of Radiance for the GameCube. The developers at Intelligent Systems wanted to continue the story of Path of Radiance on home consoles, but they decided not to release it on the GameCube as it was becoming a redundant system. Instead, as they had seen the Fire Emblem series' ability to sell hardware, they chose to develop the next title for the then-in-development Wii. Development began in May 2005, the same time the Wii was first announced under its codename "Revolution". The reason development began so early was because they wanted to release Radiant Dawn as close as possible to the console's release, so it would boost both hardware and software sales: this was the first time in the series' history the developers had attempted anything like that. They also decided to make it a Wii exclusive rather than making versions for both Wii and GameCube. This in turn coincided with the decision to keep the series on home consoles rather than developing for the new portable Nintendo DS after its absence from them between the releases of Path of Radiance and Fire Emblem: Thracia 776. The Wii's motion controls options were not implemented into the gameplay as it felt unnecessary to the design. Wi-Fi compatibility had been considered, with features such as downloadable battle maps and units, although difficulties relating to balance and difficulty prevented the idea from developing. Radiant Dawn would be the last mainline Fire Emblem title released for a Nintendo home console until the release of Fire Emblem: Three Houses for the Nintendo Switch in 2019.

As with the previous game, the CGI cutscenes were created by Digital Frontier. The staff numbers, including those working on the cutscenes, went from around one hundred for Path of Radiance to around 200 for Radiant Dawn: half the staff worked on the game itself, while the other half worked on the cutscenes. For the cutscenes, Digital Frontier were asked to show a more epic scope rather than just focusing on the characters, a trend from Path of Radiance the developers felt was wrong. All of the character movements in cutscenes were mapped using motion capture, with between 100 and 150 animations per character to implement.

The scenario was a continuation of the narrative of Path of Radiance, even though that game was not given an intentional cliffhanger ending. So the story would be comprehensible for people who had not played Path of Radiance, the story was split up into four segments divided between the game's various factions. The team initially thought of a three-part structure, then settled on the current format. Their aim from the beginning was to create a large-scale, intricate world for players to enjoy. It was the first time the developers had incorporated such a structure into a Fire Emblem game. The dialogue for characters was made slightly rougher based on feedback from Path of Radiance, where character dialogue remained calm and cultured even in battle situations. The total number of characters increased by approximately 1.5 times compared to Path of Radiance. So players could keep track of how characters interacted with each other, the team introduced a character relationship flow chart. The game's Japanese subtitle made reference to both a key character and the way Tellius came to be. They also wanted to continue to portray the themes of conflict explored in Path of Radiance. The game's thematic color, expressed in its artwork and presentation, was red, as opposed to the use of blue in Path of Radiance. Senri Kita, the character designer for Path of Radiance, returned in that capacity for Radiant Dawn.

== Reception ==
Reception

Aggregate scores
| Aggregator | Score |
|---|---|
| GameRankings | 78.95% (Note: Based on 35 reviews) |
| Metacritic | 78/100 |

Review scores
| Publication | Score |
|---|---|
| 1Up.com | 9/10 |
| Electronic Gaming Monthly | 8.83/10 |
| Eurogamer | 7/10 |
| Game Informer | 7/10 |
| GameRevolution | B+ |
| GameSpot | 6/10 |
| GamesTM | 8/10 |
| GameTrailers | 7.3/10 |
| IGN | 8/10 |
| Nintendo Life | 8/10 |
| Nintendo Power | 9.5/10 |
| Official Nintendo Magazine | 78% |

Radiant Dawn holds a score of 78/100 on the review aggregator Metacritic, indicating generally favorable reviews. GameSpot's Lark Anderson noted that, although players can save mid-battle, the difficulty "will easily overwhelm even experienced tacticians." Eurogamer's Keza MacDonald appreciated the depth and refinement of the game, but proceeded to note a lack of accessibility due to greater complication and difficulty as Radiant Dawn progresses. Some reviewers were also critical of the developers' choice not to use the Wii's motion controls, although RPGamer's Bryan Boulette commented that "the game thankfully delivers a traditional experience that isn't changed just for the sake of changing it." In general, critics praised the gameplay system recognized in previous Fire Emblem games, but noted that the game felt too similar to its GameCube predecessor, with Official Nintendo Magazine's Chandra Nair commenting that Radiant Dawn has "refused to move forward." Hyper's Yuri Spadeface commends the game for its "deep strategy and for being hard". However, he criticises it for being "unforgiving", noting that it features "permanent death and is not really a Wii game".

Reviewers praised refinements of gameplay aspects present in Path of Radiance, such as the weapon forging system, which ONM thought was simpler to control in Radiant Dawn. Despite this, other changes, such as those to the support system, were not as welcome, with GameSpot commenting that support conversations "have been reduced to mere battlefield chatter." 1UP's Michael Donahoe praised the game's length and range of characters, but stated that the laguz "still aren't very useful." Although Fire Emblem games have been praised for their plot and characterisation in the past, GameSpot described the story as "laughable" and the game's villains as clichéd and "one-dimensional." Conversely, RPGamer lauded the alterations in perspective by use of different protagonists, which Boulette felt "makes the overall story feel so much broader and more expansive in scope."

The game's presentation received a mixed response, with IGN's Mark Bozon lauding the use of FMV and accompanying voice acting, although he commented that these were too infrequent, and that voice acting should have been used for the entirety of the game. The game's music received a positive response, with GameSpy crediting the work of series composer Yuka Tsujiyoko as "Remarkably good." However, multiple reviewers noted that the game's visuals were very similar to its predecessor's, with GameSpot rating them as "little to no improvement graphically" from Path of Radiance. GameSpy noted that the game's visuals "aren't mindblowing," but welcomed Radiant Dawn's interface and camera, stating that "A strategy game should often focus on function before form, but Radiant Dawn nails both."
