= Crimea Air =

Ukrainian regional airline

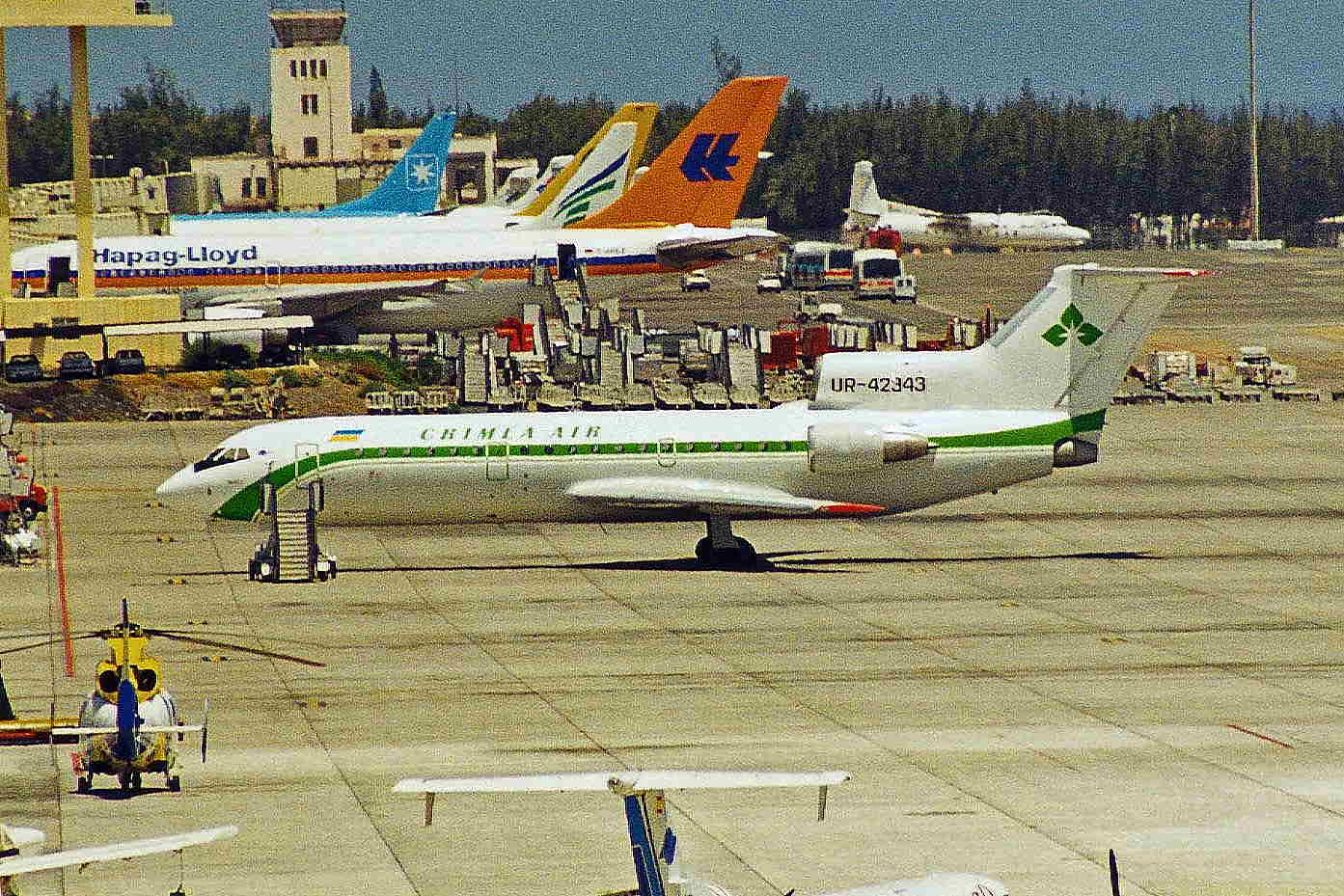
IATA	ICAO	Call sign
OR	KYM	CRIMEA AIR
- Founded: October 4, 1996
- Ceased operations: 2007
- Hubs: Simferopol International Airport
- Fleet size: 3
- Headquarters: Simferopol International Airport; Simferopol

Crimea Air was an airline on the grounds of Simferopol International Airport in Simferopol, Crimea. It was established and started operations on 4 October 1996 and operated regional feeder services. Its main base was Simferopol International Airport. Crimea Air was liquidated in 2007.

Its IATA code has been since reassigned to Arkefly.

== Fleet ==
The Crimea Air fleet consisted of the following aircraft:

- 2 Yakovlev Yak-42
- 7 Antonov An-24
- 1 Antonov An-26
