= Krim =

Krim may refer to:

== Places ==
- Crimea, or Krim in Ukrainian, a peninsula in Eastern Europe
  - Port Krym
- De Krim, a village in Overijssel, Netherlands
- Mount Krim, a mountain in Slovenia

== People ==
- Arthur J. Krim, geographer and architectural historian
- Arthur B. Krim (1910–1994), American entertainment executive and Democratic Party official
- Donald Krim (1945–2011), American film distributor
- Jacqueline Krim, American physicist
- John Krim, German-Russian-American craftsman
- Lucia and Leo Krim, American siblings killed by their nanny in 2012 in New York City
- Mathilde Krim (1926 –2018), American medical researcher
- Norman Krim (1913–2011), American electronics engineer and engineering executive
- Seymour Krim (1922–1989), American author, editor and literary critic
- Tariq Krim (born 1972) French entrepreneur
- Krim Belkacem (1922–1970), Algerian revolutionary fighter

== Other uses ==
- Krim language, spoken in Sierra Leone
- NK Krim, a Slovenian football club
- RK Krim, a Slovenian handball club
- KRIM-LP (96.3 FM), a radio station in Payson, Arizona
- KRiMZ, in-game id of Freddy Johnson, Swedish professional Counter-Strike player
- Black Krim, a tomato cultivar

== See also ==
- Crim (disambiguation)
- Krym (disambiguation)
- Krim Krim, a sub-prefecture of Logone Occidental Region in Chad
- Karim, a given name and surname of Arabic origin
- Abd el-Krim (1882–1963), Moroccan political and military leader
- Krims, a surname
