= List of Linux games =

king

This is a list of specific PC titles. For a list of all PC titles, see List of PC games.

The following is a list of games released on the Linux operating system. Games do not need to be exclusive to Linux, but they do need to be natively playable on Linux to be listed here.

== List ==
The following list has 27 segments in total, a numerical section followed by sections ranging from A to Z.

=== 0–9 ===
| Name | Developer | Publisher | Genres | Date released |
|---|---|---|---|---|
| 0 A.D. | Wildfire Games | | Real-time strategy | 2014/10/12 |
| 10,000,000 | EightyEight Games LTD | | Puzzle, RPG | 2012/08/29 |
| 1001 Spikes | Nicalis, Inc. | | Platform, Adventure | 2014/06/03 |
| 140 | Carlsen Games | | Action, Indie | 2013/10/16 |
| 1942: The Pacific Air War | MicroProse | Night Dive Studios | Simulation, Strategy | 2015/04/01 |
| 2064: Read Only Memories | MidBoss, LLC. | | Adventure | 2015/10/06 |
| 6180 the moon | Turtle Cream, PokPoong Games | Turtle Cream | Action, Indie | 2014/09/19 |
| 7 Billion Humans | Tomorrow Corporation | Tomorrow Corporation | Puzzle | 2018/08/23 |
| 7 Days to Die | The Fun Pimps | The Fun Pimps Entertainment LLC | Action, Adventure, Indie | 2013/12/13 |
| The 7th Guest | Trilobyte | Nightdive Studios | Interactive movie, Puzzle adventure | 2013/10/19 |
| 7 Mages | Napoleon Games, s.r.o. | | RPG | 2016/03/15 |
| 8BitMMO | Archive Entertainment | | Action, Adventure, RPG, Indie | 2015/01/26 |
| 911 Operator | Jutsu Games | PlayWay S.A. | Simulation, Strategy, Indie | 2017/02/24 |
| 9 Monkeys of Shaolin | Sobaka Studio | ESDigital | Beat 'em up | 2020/10/16 |
| 99 Levels to Hell | Zaxis Games | | Side-scrolling | 2013/02/26 |
| 99Vidas | QUByte Interactive | | Action, Indie | 2016/12/22 |

=== A ===
| Name | Developer | Publisher | Genres | Date released |
|---|---|---|---|---|
| A Bird Story | Freebird Games | | Adventure, RPG, Indie | November 7, 2014 |
| A Boy and His Blob | Abstraction Games | Midnight City | Adventure | January 19, 2016 |
| A Day in the Woods | RetroEpic Software | | Casual, Indie, Strategy | September 24, 2011 |
| A Druid's Duel | Thoughtshelter Games | Surprise Attack | Strategy, Indie | February 25, 2015 |
| A Game of Changes | Nuno Donato | | Casual, Indie | June 2, 2016 |
| A Golden Wake | Grundislav Games | Wadjet Eye Games | Adventure, Indie | October 9, 2014 |
| A Good Snowman Is Hard To Build | Alan Hazelden | Draknek | Indie | February 25, 2015 |
| A Hole New World | MadGearGames | | Adventure | Spring 2017 |
| A Kiss for the Petals - Remembering How We Met | St. Michael's Girls School | MangaGamer | Adventure | September 25, 2015 |
| A Little Lily Princess | Hanabira | Hanako Games | Simulation, Indie | May 19, 2016 |
| A Long Way Home | Jonathan Mulcahy | | Adventure, Casual, Indie | May 27, 2016 |
| A Mass of Dead | Dev Arc | | Action, Indie | July 15, 2015 |
| A Midsummer Night's Choice | Choice of Games | | Adventure, RPG, Indie | August 25, 2016 |
| A More Beautiful World - A Visual Novel | Afterthought Studios | Sekai Project | Simulation, Indie, RPG, Casual | 2017 |
| A Normal Lost Phone | Accidental Queens | Plug In Digital | Casual, Indie | January 26, 2017 |
| A Quiver of Crows | Sheado.net | | Action, Indie | October 19, 2016 |
| A Short Hike | adamgryu | | Adventure, Indie | July 30, 2019 |
| A Study in Steampunk: Choice by Gaslight | Hosted Games | | RPG, Indie | November 20, 2015 |
| A Tale of Two Kingdoms | Crystal Shard | | Adventure, Indie | Spring 2017 |
| A Trip to Yugoslavia: Director's Cut | Piotr Bunkowski | Sometimes You | Action, Adventure, Casual, Indie | February 22, 2017 |
| A Valley Without Wind | Arcen Games | Arcen Games, LLC | Action, Adventure, Indie | April 24, 2012 |
| A Valley Without Wind 2 | Arcen Games | Arcen Games, LLC | Action, Adventure, Indie, Strategy | February 18, 2013 |
| A Virus Named TOM | Misfits Attic | | Action, Indie, Strategy | August 1, 2012 |
| A Wild Catgirl Appears! | NewWestGames | | Adventure | January 5, 2016 |
| A Wise Use of Time | Choice of Games | | RPG, Indie | September 4, 2015 |
| A Wizard's Lizard | Lost Decade Games | | Action, Indie, RPG | June 16, 2014 |
| A-Gents | phime studio LLC | | Action, Indie | April 17, 2016 |
| A.V. | FirstForever Studios | MAGIC Spell Studios | Adventure, Indie | February 13, 2015 |
| AaaaaAAaaaAAAaaAAAAaAAAAA!!! for the Awesome | Dejobaan Games, LLC | | Action, Indie, Sports | November 23, 2011 |
| Aaru's Awakening | Lumenox ehf | | Action, Adventure, Indie | February 23, 2015 |
| Aberoth | Jarbit | | Action, Adventure, Indie | July 17, 2015 |
| Abomination Tower | Amethyst Quarter | | Action, Indie | February 13, 2015 |
| About Love, Hate and the other ones | Black Pants Studio | | Casual, Indie | December 12, 2014 |
| Absolute Drift | Funselektor Labs Inc. | | Action, Racing, Simulation | July 29, 2015 |
| Abyss: The Wraiths of Eden | Artifex Mundi sp. z o.o. | | Adventure, Casual | October 12, 2012 |
| ACE Academy | PixelFade Inc | | Action, Adventure, Indie, RPG | August 22, 2016 |
| Ace of Protectors | xPathfinder | | Action, Adventure, Indie, RPG | June 27, 2016 |
| Achron | Hazardous Software | Hazardous Software | Real-time strategy | August 29, 2011 |
| Across The Rhine | MicroProse | Retroism | Strategy | July 1, 1995 |
| Action Henk | RageSquid | | Action, Racing, Indie | May 11, 2015 |
| Action Legion | Aeonic Entertainment | | Action, Indie | April 19, 2016 |
| Adam and Eve: The Game - Chapter 1 | Religious Studios | | Action, Adventure, Casual, Indie | February 26, 2016 |
| Adele: Following the Signs | Unosquare | | Adventure, Indie | June 2, 2016 |
| ADOM (Ancient Domains Of Mystery) | Thomas Biskup | | Adventure, Indie, RPG, Strategy | November 16, 2015 |
| Adorables | White Rabbit Games | | Casual, Indie, Sports, Strategy | March 30, 2016 |
| AdVenture Capitalist | Hyper Hippo Games | | Casual, Indie, Free to Play | March 30, 2015 |
| Adventure in the Tower of Flight | Pixel Barrage Entertainment, Inc. | | Action, Adventure, Indie | July 3, 2015 |
| ADventure Lib | Fancy Fish Games | | Adventure, Indie | August 4, 2015 |
| Adventures of Shuggy | Smudged Cat Games Ltd | | Indie | June 13, 2012 |
| Adventurezator: When Pigs Fly | Pigasus Games | Degica | Adventure, Indie | July 23, 2014 |
| AdvertCity | VoxelStorm | | Tycoon game, Indie | April 17, 2015 |
| Aeon Command | Bat Country Games, LLC | | Casual, Indie, Strategy | July 3, 2014 |
| Affairs of the Court: Choice of Romance | Choice of Games | | Adventure, RPG, Indie | August 16, 2013 |
| After Reset RPG | Black Cloud Studios | | Adventure, RPG, Indie | March 9, 2015 |
| Agatha Christie - The ABC Murders | Artefacts Studios | Microids | Adventure | February 4, 2016 |
| Age of Conquest IV | Noble Master LLC | | Indie, Strategy | April 5, 2016 |
| Age of Defense | Battlecruiser Games | | Indie, Strategy | Fall 2017 |
| Age of Fear 2: The Chaos Lord | Leszek Sliwko | KISS Ltd | Adventure, RPG, Indie | March 27, 2015 |
| Age of Fear: The Undead King | Leszek Sliwko | KISS Ltd | Adventure, RPG, Indie | June 26, 2015 |
| Age of Wonders III | Triumph Studios | | Turn-based strategy | March 31, 2014 |
| Agenda | Exordium Games | | Indie, Simulation, Strategy | September 21, 2016 |
| Agent Walker: Secret Journey | Brave Giant LTD | Artifex Mundi | Adventure, Casual | September 1, 2016 |
| Agricola: All Creatures Big and Small | DIGIDICED | | Indie, Strategy | February 14, 2017 |
| AI War: Fleet Command | Arcen Games | | Strategy, Indie | October 21, 2009 |
| Aiball | HFM Games | | Action, Adventure, Indie | June 19, 2016 |
| Air Brawl | Landfall Games | N/A | Action, Indie | June 2, 2015 |
| Air Conflicts: Pacific Carriers | Games Farm | | Action, Simulation | September 21, 2012 |
| Air Conflicts: Vietnam | Games Farm | | Action, Simulation | October 2, 2013 |
| Airline Tycoon Deluxe | Spellbound AG | Black Forest Games | Simulation | August 1, 1998 |
| Airscape: The Fall of Gravity | Cross-Product | | Indie | August 11, 2015 |
| Airships: Conquer the Skies | David Stark | | Action, Strategy, Indie | February 25, 2015 |
| Akaneiro: Demon Hunters | Spicy Horse | | Action, RPG, Indie | November 24, 2014 |
| Al Emmo and the Lost Dutchman's Mine | Himalaya Studios | | Adventure, Indie | September 5, 2006 |
| Alarameth TD™ | Matt Gadient | Steam | Strategy | June 23, 2015 |
| Alchemist's Awakening | Osaris Games | | Action, Indie | March 21, 2016 |
| Alchemy Mysteries: Prague Legends | Jetdogs Studios | | Adventure, Casual, Indie | December 22, 2014 |
| ALICE VR | Carbon Studio | Klabater | Adventure, Indie | October 27, 2016 |
| Alien Blitz | Jean-Baptiste Simillon | | Action, Indie | May 9, 2016 |
| Alien Robot Monsters | Kraftix Games | | Action, Indie, Strategy | September 9, 2015 |
| Alien: Isolation | Creative Assembly, Feral Interactive | Sega, 20th Century Fox | Action-adventure, FPS, Stealth, Survival Horror | October 27, 2015 |
| Almightree: The Last Dreamer | Chocoarts | Digital Tribe | Action, Indie, Strategy | September 7, 2015 |
| ALONE IN SPACE | Butterflyware | | Adventure | February 27, 2016 |
| ALONE? | Deceptive Games Ltd. | | Action, Adventure, Indie, Simulation | October 10, 2016 |
| Along the Edge | Nova-box | | Indie | October 12, 2016 |
| Alpacapaca Dash | Synnergy Circle Games | | Casual, Indie | January 23, 2017 |
| ALPAGES : THE FIVE BOOKS | BERNARD Nicolas | GenomGames | Action, Adventure, Indie | October 14, 2015 |
| Alphabeats: Master Edition | Rad Dragon | | Action, Indie | March 7, 2016 |
| Alter World | Giorgi Abelashvili | | Indie | May 29, 2015 |
| Altitude | Nimbly Games | | Action, Indie | December 4, 2009 |
| Alum | Crashable Studios | N/A | Adventure, Indie, RPG | May 15, 2015 |
| Alwa's Awakening | Elden Pixels | | Adventure, Indie | February 2, 2017 |
| Alwa's Legacy | Elden Pixels | | Adventure, Indie | June 17, 2020 |
| Always Remember Me | Winter Wolves | | Casual, Indie, Simulation | April 17, 2011 |
| Always Sometimes Monsters | Vagabond Dog | Devolver Digital | RPG, Indie | May 21, 2014 |
| Always The Same Blue Sky... | Crimson Night | Flying Interactive | Adventure, Casual, Indie | |
| Amaranthine | Roman Kozhukhov | | Action, Indie | April 6, 2016 |
| Amazing Frog? | Fayju | | Adventure, Indie | November 20, 2014 |
| American Truck Simulator | SCS Software | | Simulation, Indie | February 2, 2016 |
| Amnesia: A Machine for Pigs | The Chinese Room | Frictional Games | Survival Horror | September 10, 2013 |
| Amnesia: The Dark Descent | Frictional Games | | Survival Horror | September 8, 2010 |
| Among Ripples | Eat Create Sleep | | Casual, Indie, Simulation | January 22, 2015 |
| Among the Heavens | Jetdogs Studios | | Simulation | November 6, 2015 |
| Among the Sleep | Krillbite Studio | | Action, Adventure, Indie | May 29, 2014 |
| Amygdala | MachineSpirit | | Action, Adventure, Indie | July 15, 2015 |
| An Alien with a Magnet | Rejected Games | | Adventure, Casual, Indie | March 28, 2017 |
| An Assassin in Orlandes | Tin Man Games | | Adventure, Indie, RPG | May 12, 2015 |
| An Octave Higher | Kidalang | AGM PLAYISM | Adventure, Indie | March 27, 2015 |
| Analogue: A Hate Story | Love Conquers All Games | | Indie | April 27, 2012 |
| Ancients of Fasaria: Chess Club | New Source Entertainment | | Strategy, Indie | November 1, 2015 |
| And So It Was | VolumeUp Studios | | Action, Adventure, Indie | February 29, 2016 |
| And Yet It Moves | Broken Rules | Broken Rules | Platform, Puzzle | April 2, 2009 |
| Angeldust | Frank Lucas | Metagaming B.V. | Action, Indie, MMORPG | November 18, 2016 |
| Angels That Kill | Rising Sun Interactive | | Adventure, Indie | November 20, 2015 |
| Angels with Scaly Wings | Radical Phi | | Adventure, Indie, RPG, Simulation | January 31, 2017 |
| Angry Video Game Nerd II: ASSimilation | FreakZone Games | ScrewAttack Games | Action, Adventure, Indie | March 29, 2016 |
| Anima Gate of Memories | Anima Project | Badland Games | Action, Adventure, RPG | June 2, 2016 |
| Animal Gods | Still Games | | Action, Adventure, Indie | October 12, 2015 |
| Animated Puzzles | Mexond | | Casual, Indie | December 16, 2016 |
| Anime Studio Simulator | Visualnoveler | | Indie, Simulation | November 2, 2016 |
| Anna - Extended Edition | Dreampainters | Kalypso Media Digital | Adventure, Indie | April 12, 2013 |
| Anna's Quest | Daedalic Entertainment | | Adventure, Indie | July 2, 2015 |
| Anno Online | Blue Byte | Ubisoft | Simulation, Strategy | January 31, 2013 |
| Anode | Kittehface Software | | Action, Indie | October 5, 2015 |
| Anodyne | Melos Han-Tani and Marina Kittaka | Analgesic Productions | Action, Adventure, Indie | March 22, 2013 |
| Anomaly 2 | 11 bit studios | | Action, Strategy, Indie | May 15, 2013 |
| Anomaly Defenders | 11 bit studios | | Action, Strategy, Indie | May 29, 2014 |
| Anomaly Korea | 11 bit studios | | Action, Strategy | November 6, 2013 |
| Anomaly Warzone Earth Mobile Campaign | 11 bit studios | | Action, Strategy | November 6, 2013 |
| Anomaly: Warzone Earth | 11 bit studios | | Action, Strategy, Indie | April 8, 2011 |
| Another Bar Game | Arik Games | | Action, Indie | October 25, 2023 |
| Another Star | Vision Riders Entertainment | | RPG, Indie | March 20, 2014 |
| Another World – 20th Anniversary Edition | Eric Chahi | Focus Home Interactive | Action, Adventure | April 4, 2013 |
| Anoxemia | BSK Games | | Adventure, Indie | January 16, 2015 |
| Ant War: Domination | Anarchy Enterprises | | Simulation, Strategy, Indie | October 2, 2015 |
| Antichamber | Alexander Bruce | Demruth | Puzzle Platformer | January 31, 2013 |
| Antisquad | InsGames | INSGAMES LIMITED | Action, Adventure, Strategy | October 31, 2014 |
| AoF Chess Club 2.0 | NSE Circuit | | MMO, Strategy, Indie | November 4, 2015 |
| Aozora Meikyuu | Yume Creations | | Adventure, Indie | January 27, 2016 |
| Apotheon | Alientrap | | Action, Adventure, RPG, Indie | February 3, 2015 |
| Appointment With FEAR | Tin Man Games | | Adventure, Indie | August 26, 2014 |
| Aquaria | Bit Blot, LLC | | Indie | December 7, 2007 |
| Approaching Blocks | Dymchick1 | | Casual, Indie | June 3, 2016 |
| Aqua Panic! | Eko Software | | Casual, Indie | November 9, 2015 |
| AR-K | Gato Salvaje S.L. | | Adventure | July 21, 2014 |
| AR-K: The Great Escape | Gato Salvaje S.L. | | Adventure, Indie | July 14, 2015 |
| Aragami | Lince Works | | Action, Adventure, Indie | |
| Arctic alive | Dima Kiva | | Action, Adventure, Simulation, Indie | January 29, 2016 |
| ARK: Survival Evolved | Studio Wildcard | | Action, Adventure, RPG, Indie | June 2, 2015 |
| ARK: Survival Of The Fittest | Studio Wildcard | | Action, Adventure, MMO, Indie | March 15, 2016 |
| Arkshot | Code Avarice | Digerati Distribution | Action, Indie | May 19, 2016 |
| Arma Tactics | Bohemia Interactive | | Strategy, Indie | October 1, 2013 |
| Armed and Gelatinous | Three Flip Studios | | Action, Indie, Strategy | March 1, 2016 |
| ARMED SEVEN | ASTRO PORT | Nyu Media | Action, Indie | March 6, 2015 |
| Armello | League of Geeks | | Adventure, RPG, Strategy, Indie | September 1, 2015 |
| Armikrog | Pencil Test Studios | Versus Evil | Adventure, Indie | September 30, 2015 |
| Army of Tentacles: (Not) A Cthulhu Dating Sim | Stegalosaurus Game Development | | Adventure, RPG, Indie | February 15, 2016 |
| ASA: A Space Adventure - Remastered Edition | Simon Says: Watch! Play! | N/A | Adventure | March 4, 2015 |
| Ascendant | Hapa Games | | Action, Adventure, RPG, Indie | May 13, 2014 |
| Asphyxia | ebi-hime | Sekai Project | Simulation, Indie | August 4, 2015 |
| Assault Android Cactus | Witch Beam | N/A | Action, Indie | August 28, 2013 |
| AssaultCube (AC) | Rabid Viper Productions | N/A | First-person shooter | November 18, 2006 |
| AssaultCube Reloaded (ACR) | AssaultCube Reloaded Task Force | N/A | First-person shooter | December 24, 2010 |
| Asteroid Bounty Hunter | Just1337 Studio | KupiKey | Action, Adventure, Indie | February 17, 2016 |
| Astral Breakers | Intropy Games | | Action, Indie | February 4, 2016 |
| Astral Gun | Thomas Moon Kang | | Action, Indie | February 2, 2016 |
| Astro Emporia | Squirrelbot Games | | Casual, Strategy, Indie | February 2, 2015 |
| Atari Vault | Code Mystics | Atari | Action, Adventure, Racing, Sports, Strategy | March 24, 2016 |
| ATOM GRRRL!! | Cosmillica | Sekai Project | Casual, Indie | March 1, 2016 |
| Atriage | Batu Games LLC | | Indie, Strategy | April 7, 2016 |
| Attractio | GameCoder Studios | Bandai Namco Entertainment | Action | January 18, 2016 |
| Audiosurf 2 | Dylan Fitterer | | Music, Indie | May 26, 2015 |
| AuroraRL | Sun Dogs | Siberian Digital | Action, Adventure, Indie, Strategy | April 8, 2016 |
| Auto Dealership Tycoon | Diggidy.net, LLC | | Indie, Simulation | October 23, 2015 |
| Automata Empire | Nonadecimal Creative | | Indie, Simulation, Strategy | April 8, 2016 |
| Autumn | Nuno Donato | | Casual, Strategy, Indie | September 23, 2014 |
| Avadon: The Black Fortress | Spiderweb Software | | RPG, Indie | August 17, 2011 |
| Avalon Lords: Dawn Rises | Animus Interactive Inc | | Strategy, Indie | April 28, 2016 |
| Awesomenauts | Ronimo Games | | Action, Strategy, Indie | August 1, 2012 |
| Axe, Bow & Staff | Clewcat Games | | Action, Indie, RPG | May 20, 2016 |
| Axes and Acres | BrainGoodGames | | Strategy, Indie | April 7, 2016 |
| Axiom Verge | Thomas Happ Games | | Metroidvania | May 14, 2015 |
| Axis Football 2015 | Axis Games | | Sports | July 15, 2015 |
| Axis Football 2023 | Axis Games | | Sports | September 7, 2022 |
| Axis Football 2024 | Axis Games | | Sports | September 13, 2023 |

=== B ===
| Name | Developer | Publisher | Genres | Date released |
|---|---|---|---|---|
| Baba Is You | Hempuli | | Puzzle, Indie | 13 March 2019 |
| Back to Bed | Bedtime Digital Games | | Casual, Indie | August 6, 2014 |
| Backstage Pass | sakevisual | | Simulation, Indie | May 30, 2014 |
| Bacteria | Sometimes You | | Casual, Indie | March 23, 2016 |
| Bad Hotel | Lucky Frame | | Casual, Indie | October 16, 2013 |
| Badland Bandits | Wild Wolf Std | | Action, Racing, RPG, Simulation | July 16, 2015 |
| BADLAND: Game of the Year Edition | Frogmind | | Action, Adventure, Indie | May 26, 2015 |
| Baldur's Gate II: Enhanced Edition | Overhaul Games | Atari | RPG | December 16, 2014 |
| Baldur's Gate: Enhanced Edition | Overhaul Games | Atari | RPG | November 27, 2014 |
| Ballpoint Universe - Infinite | Arachnid Games | | Action, Indie | December 17, 2013 |
| Balrum | Balcony Team | | Adventure, Indie, RPG, Strategy | February 29, 2016 |
| Bard to the Future | Battlebard Games | | Action, Adventure, Indie | February 27, 2015 |
| Bard's Gold | Erdem Sen | | Indie | August 14, 2015 |
| Barony | Turning Wheel LLC | | Action, Adventure, RPG, Indie | June 23, 2015 |
| Basement | Halfbus | | Simulation, Strategy, Indie | April 30, 2015 |
| Bastion | Supergiant Games | Warner Bros. Interactive Entertainment | Action RPG | July 20, 2011 |
| Batla | [geim].pro | Abyss Lights Studio LLP | Action, Free to Play | May 14, 2015 |
| Battle for Blood | YFC games | | Casual, Free to Play, Strategy | July 8, 2015 |
| Battle For The Sun | Appsolutely Studios | | Action, Indie | July 22, 2015 |
| Battle Group 2 | Bane Games | Merge Games | Action, Indie, Strategy | June 13, 2014 |
| Battle of Empires : 1914-1918 | Great War Team | Best Way Soft | Action, Indie, Strategy | July 22, 2015 |
| Battle Ranch | Playboom | | Action, Indie, Strategy, Casual | February 2, 2015 |
| Battle Worlds: Kronos | King Art Games | | Strategy | November 4, 2013 |
| BattleBlock Theater | The Behemoth | Microsoft Studios, The Behemoth | Platformer | May 15, 2014 |
| BattleSpace | Funnel Inc. | Gravity Europe | Free to Play, Strategy | September 27, 2013 |
| Beach Bounce | AJTilley.com | | Adventure, Casual, Indie | August 14, 2015 |
| BeamNG.drive | BeamNG | | Vehicle simulation | May 29, 2015 |
| Bear Haven Nights | SunRay Games | | Action, Adventure, Indie, Strategy | January 29, 2016 |
| Bear Simulator | Farjay.com | | Action, Adventure, Indie, Simulation | February 26, 2016 |
| Beasts of Prey | Octagon Interactive | | Action, Indie, Adventure | June 5, 2014 |
| Beat Hazard | Cold Beam Games | | Action, Indie, Casual | April 15, 2010 |
| BeatBlasters III | Chainsawesome Games | | Action, Indie | February 21, 2014 |
| Beatbuddy: Tale of the Guardians | Threaks | Reverb Publishing | Adventure, Casual, Indie, Action | August 6, 2013 |
| Before the Echo | Iridium Studios | N/A | Indie, RPG | October 20, 2011 |
| Bermuda | InvertMouse | | Indie, Adventure | March 17, 2015 |
| Bernie Needs Love | Protomni Multimedia | | Action, Indie, Casual, Indie, Adventure | August 21, 2015 |
| Besiege | Spiderling Studios | | Indie, Simulation | January 28, 2015 |
| Best of Us | Hosted Games | | Adventure, Indie, RPG | April 22, 2016 |
| Beyond Eyes | Tiger and Squid | Team17 | Indie, Adventure | August 11, 2015 |
| Beyond Gravity | Qwiboo Ltd | | Action, Casual | September 24, 2014 |
| Bibou | Andre Bertaglia | OtakuMaker.com | Action, Indie, Adventure | April 29, 2016 |
| Big Journey to Home | The Light Sword Team | | Indie, RPG, Strategy | August 20, 2015 |
| Big Pharma | Twice Circled | Positech Games | Indie, Simulation, Strategy | August 27, 2015 |
| Big Thinkers 1st Grade | Humongous Entertainment | | Casual | August 18, 2015 |
| Big Thinkers Kindergarten | Humongous Entertainment | | Casual | August 18, 2015 |
| Bik - A Space Adventure | Zotnip | | Indie, Adventure | October 14, 2014 |
| Binaries | Ant Workshop Ltd | | Action, Indie | April 4, 2016 |
| Biodrone Battle | voodoosoft | | Action, Indie, Casual | July 17, 2015 |
| Bionic Dues | Arcen Games | | Indie, Turn-based strategy | April 18, 2014 |
| Bionic Heart | Winter Wolves | | Indie, Adventure | July 7, 2009 |
| Bionic Heart 2 | Winter Wolves | | Indie, Adventure | April 1, 2013 |
| BioShock Infinite | Irrational Games | 2K Games | First-person shooter | March 26, 2013 |
| Bit Blaster XL | Nickervision Studios | | Action, Indie, Casual | January 22, 2016 |
| Bit Shifter | Plastic Games | | Action, Indie, Strategy | November 2, 2015 |
| BIT.TRIP Presents... Runner2: Future Legend of Rhythm Alien | Gaijin Games | | Action, Indie | February 26, 2013 |
| Bitardia | varlamov5264 | | Action, Indie, Adventure | November 20, 2015 |
| Bitardia Cards: Memes of 2ch | varlamov5264 | | Casual, Free to Play, Strategy | May 19, 2016 |
| Bitweb | practicing01 | | Casual, Free to Play | June 3, 2015 |
| Black Closet | Hanako Games | | Indie, RPG, Simulation, Strategy | September 16, 2015 |
| Black Ice | Super Duper Garrett Cooper | | Action, Indie, Strategy | July 9, 2014 |
| Black the Fall | Sand Sailor Studio | | Action, Indie, Adventure | July 4, 2014 |
| BLACKHOLE | FiolaSoft Studio | | Action, Indie, Adventure | February 28, 2015 |
| Blacksea Odyssey | Blacksea Odyssey | | Action, Indie | June 1, 2016 |
| Blackwell Convergence | Wadjet Eye Games | | Indie, Adventure | January 13, 2012 |
| Blackwell Unbound | Wadjet Eye Games | | Indie, Adventure | January 13, 2012 |
| BlazeRush | Targem Games | | Action, Indie, Racing | October 28, 2014 |
| BLEAK: Welcome to Glimmer | Tenwall Creatives, Inc. | | Action, Indie | April 8, 2016 |
| Bleed | Ian Campbell | | Action, Indie | July 3, 2013 |
| Blinding Dark | Games Hut | BulkyPix | Action, Adventure | August 12, 2014 |
| Block Legend DX | Dot Warrior Games | | Adventure, RPG | February 24, 2015 |
| Blocks That Matter | Swing Swing Submarine | N/A | Casual, Indie | August 20, 2011 |
| Blockstorm | GhostShark | IndieGala | Action, Indie | May 21, 2015 |
| Blockwick 2 | Kieffer Bros. | | Casual, Indie | June 21, 2015 |
| Blood Code | WeShare Games | | Indie, Simulation, Strategy, Casual | December 29, 2015 |
| Bloodbath Kavkaz | Dagestan Technology | | Action, Indie, Adventure | April 21, 2015 |
| BloodGate | Outsmart | | Action, Indie, Adventure | June 2, 2016 |
| BloodNet | MicroProse | Retroism | Adventure | January 1, 1993 |
| Blue Libra | Orator Games | | Action, Indie, Strategy | October 13, 2011 |
| Blue Rose | White Cat | | Adventure, Indie, Simulation | August 17, 2013 |
| Blue Sheep | Noetic Games | | Action, Indie, Adventure | March 31, 2016 |
| Blueberry Garden | Erik Svedäng | | Indie, Adventure | June, 2009 |
| Blueprint Tycoon | Endless Loop Studios | | Casual, Indie, Simulation | May 13, 2016 |
| Blues and Bullets | A Crowd of Monsters | | Adventure | July 23, 2015 |
| Bolt Riley, A Reggae Adventure | Adventure Mob | | Adventure, Casual, Indie | April 20, 2016 |
| BOMB: Who let the dogfight? | La Moustache Studio | | Action, Indie, Adventure, Simulation | August 1, 2015 |
| Bombernauts | Eyebrow Interactive | | Action, Indie | July 31, 2015 |
| BomberZone | Dracula Bytes | exosyphen studios | Action, Casual, Indie | May 27, 2016 |
| Bombing Bastards | Sanuk Games | | Action, Indie | December 5, 2014 |
| BoneBone | Vladis Fire | | Action, Indie, Strategy | June 17, 2016 |
| Bonsai | Rooted Concepts | Rooted Concepts | Casual, Indie, Simulation | February 18, 2016 |
| Borderlands 2 | Gearbox Software | 2K Games | Action RPG, FPS | September 18, 2012 |
| Borderlands: The Pre-Sequel | Gearbox Software | 2K Games | Action RPG, FPS | October 14, 2014 |
| Borstal | The Secret Pie | | Adventure, Indie, RPG | March 22, 2016 |
| Boson X | Ian MacLarty | | Action, Indie | September 15, 2014 |
| BossConstructor | Mirko Seithe | | Action, Indie, Simulation, RPG | November 4, 2014 |
| Bot Vice | DYA Games | | Action, Adventure, Indie | July 11, 2016 |
| Bouboum | Atelier 801 | | Indie, Strategy, Casual | November 20, 2013 |
| Bound By Flame | Spiders | Focus Home Interactive | Action RPG | May 8, 2014 |
| boxlife | tequibo | | Indie | January 14, 2016 |
| Braid | Number None | | Indie, Strategy, Casual | April 11, 2009 |
| BrainBread 2 | Reperio Studios | | Action, Adventure, Indie | July 20, 2016 |
| Bravada | Interbellum team | | Indie, Strategy, RPG | August 22, 2014 |
| Braveland | Tortuga Team | | Indie, Strategy, Casual | March 17, 2014 |
| Braveland Pirate | Tortuga Team | | Indie, Strategy, Casual, RPG | September 15, 2015 |
| Braveland Wizard | Tortuga Team | | Indie, Strategy, Casual, RPG | December 4, 2014 |
| Brawl | Bloober Team | | Action, Indie | August 13, 2015 |
| Breach & Clear | Mighty Rabbit Studios | Gambitious Digital Entertainment | Action, Simulation, RPG, Strategy | March 22, 2014 |
| Breach & Clear: Deadline | Mighty Rabbit Studios | Gambitious Digital Entertainment | Action, Indie, Strategy, RPG | July 21, 2015 |
| Break Chance Memento | Cyanide Tea | | Adventure, Indie | February 12, 2016 |
| Breezeblox | Pugsley LLC | | Indie, Strategy, Casual | May 15, 2015 |
| Bridge Constructor | ClockStone | Headup Games | Casual, Indie, Simulation | October 16, 2013 |
| Bridge Constructor Medieval | ClockStone | Headup Games | Casual, Indie, Simulation | September 15, 2014 |
| Bridge Constructor Playground | ClockStone | Headup Games | Casual, Indie, RPG, Simulation | July 2, 2014 |
| Bridge Constructor Stunts | ClockStone | Headup Games | Simulation | February 23, 2016 |
| Bridge! 2 | toxtronyx interactive GmbH | Aerosoft GmbH | Simulation, Strategy | April 21, 2016 |
| Brigador | Stellar Jockeys | | Action, Indie | June 2, 2016 |
| Brilliant Shadows - Part One of the Book of Gray Magic | Ithaqua Labs | | Adventure, Casual, Simulation | October 30, 2015 |
| Broadside | Duct Tape Games | | Action, Adventure, Indie | September 18, 2015 |
| Broforce | Free Lives | Devolver Digital | Action, Adventure, Casual, Indie | October 15, 2015 |
| Broken Age | Double Fine Productions | | Adventure | January 28, 2014 |
| Broken Bots | Bunnycopter | | Action, Indie | June 7, 2016 |
| Broken Dreams | Mihai Moroșanu | New Reality Games | Casual, Indie | February 19, 2016 |
| Broken Sword 1 - Shadow of the Templars: Director's Cut | Revolution Software Ltd | | Adventure | September 2, 2010 |
| Broken Sword 2 - the Smoking Mirror: Remastered | Revolution Software Ltd | | Adventure | December 2, 2009 |
| Broken Sword 5 - the Serpent's Curse | Revolution Software Ltd | | Adventure | December 4, 2013 |
| Brushwood Buddies | Steven Colling | | Casual, Indie | February 17, 2016 |
| Brütal Legend | Double Fine Productions | | Action, Adventure, Strategy | February 26, 2013 |
| Bullshot | Gato Salvaje S.L. | | Action, Indie | April 7, 2016 |
| Bunny Bash | DarkArts Studios | | Action, Casual, Indie | April 28, 2016 |
| Buried: An Interactive Story | Bromoco Games | | Adventure, Indie | January 21, 2016 |
| Burokku Girls | Silver Cow Studio | | Adventure, Indie, Simulation | February 17, 2016 |
| Butsbal | Xtase Studios | | Action, Indie | June 2, 2015 |

=== C ===
| Name | Developer | Publisher | Genres | Date released |
|---|---|---|---|---|
| C. Kane | Paul Harrington | Super Walrus Games | RPG | January 22, 2016 |
| C14 Dating | Winter Wolves | Winter Wolves | Adventure, Casual, Indie | April 27, 2016 |
| CaesarIA | rdt.32 | rdt.32 | Indie, Strategy | January 20, 2015 |
| CAFE 0 ~The Drowned Mermaid~ | ROSEVERTE | ROSEVERTE | Adventure, Casual, Indie | October 11, 2011 |
| Caffeine | Incandescent Imaging | Incandescent Imaging | Adventure, Indie | October 12, 2015 |
| Can't Drive This | Pixel Maniacs | Pixel Maniacs | Action, Indie, Racing | October 14, 2016 |
| Canabalt | Finji | Finji | Action, Indie | April 30, 2015 |
| Candice DeBébé's Incredibly Trick Lifestyle | Havishamone Games | Havishamone Games | Adventure, Indie, RPG | March 22, 2016 |
| Cannon Brawl | N/A | Turtle Sandbox | Action, Adventure, Indie, Strategy | September 19, 2014 |
| Capsized | Alientrap | Alientrap | Action, Indie | April 29, 2011 |
| Capsule Force | klobit LLC | Iron Galaxy Studios, LLC | Action, Indie | August 25, 2015 |
| Captain Forever Remix | Pixelsaurus Games | Pixelsaurus Games | Action, Indie | June 3, 2016 |
| Caravanserail | Jerome Bodin | Jerome Bodin | Indie, Simulation | February 26, 2016 |
| Card City Nights | Ludosity | Ludosity | Adventure, Casual, Indie | February 14, 2014 |
| Cardinal Quest 2 | Randomnine Ltd | Randomnine Ltd | Indie, RPG | November 23, 2015 |
| Cargo Commander | Serious Brew | Missing Link Games | Action, Indie | November 1, 2012 |
| Carnivore Land | dwCrew | dwCrew | Action, Indie | September 15, 2015 |
| Carpe Diem | Eyzi | Moonlit Studios | Casual, Indie | November 30, 2015 |
| Carrotting Brain | Raving Bots | Raving Bots | Action, Indie | October 23, 2015 |
| Cassette Beasts | Bytten Studio | Raw Fury | Role-playing | April 26, 2023 |
| Castle Chaos | Odd Comet Games | Odd Comet Games | Action, Indie, Strategy | December 8, 2015 |
| Castle Story | Sauropod Studio | Sauropod Studio | Indie, Strategy | September 23, 2013 |
| Catacomb Kids | FourbitFriday | FourbitFriday | Action, Indie, RPG | February 20, 2015 |
| Catacombs of the Undercity | Tin Man Games | Tin Man Games | Adventure, Indie, RPG | January 19, 2015 |
| Catlateral Damage | Chris Chung | Chris Chung | Action, Casual, Indie | May 27, 2015 |
| Catmouth Island | Colonthree Enterprises | Colonthree Enterprises | Adventure, Casual, Indie | December 31, 2014 |
| Cats are Liquid | Last Quarter Studios | Last Quarter Studios | Adventure, Indie | July 25, 2016 |
| Cave Story+ | Nicalis, Inc. | Nicalis, Inc. | Action, Adventure, Indie | November 22, 2011 |
| Caveman World: Mountains of Unga Boonga | GrabTheGames Studios | GrabTheGames | Adventure, Casual, Indie | April 26, 2013 |
| Caverns of the Snow Witch | Tin Man Games | Tin Man Games | Adventure, Indie, RPG | August 3, 2015 |
| Caves of Qud | Freehold Games | Freehold Games | Adventure, Indie, RPG, Strategy | July 15, 2015 |
| Celeste | Extremely OK Games | Extremely OK Games | Platform, Indie | January 25, 2018 |
| Celestial Command | Romenics | Romenics | Action, Adventure, Indie, RPG, Strategy | November 20, 2014 |
| Celestian Tales: Old North | Ekuator Games | Digital Tribe | Indie, RPG | August 10, 2015 |
| Cellar | Vertical Skull Games | Vertical Skull Games | Action, Adventure, Casual, Indie | March 23, 2016 |
| Centauri Sector | George Neguceanu | LW Games | Action, Indie, Strategy | June 24, 2015 |
| Ceres | Jötunn Games | Iceberg Interactive | Action, Indie, RPG, Simulation, Strategy | October 16, 2015 |
| Chainsaw Warrior | Auroch Digital | Auroch Digital | Adventure, Indie, RPG, Strategy | October 7, 2013 |
| Chainsaw Warrior: Lords of the Night | Auroch Digital | Auroch Digital | Action, Adventure, Indie, RPG, Strategy | February 17, 2015 |
| Challenge of the Five Realms | MicroProse | Retroism | Adventure, RPG | January 1, 1992 |
| Champion of the Gods | Choice of Games | Choice of Games | Indie, RPG | July 17, 2015 |
| Champions of Breakfast | Pirate Software | Pirate Software | Action, Indie | June 23, 2016 |
| Champions of Regnum | NGD Studios | NGD Studios | Indie, MMO, RPG | February 27, 2013 |
| Chaos on Deponia | Daedalic Entertainment | Daedalic Entertainment | Adventure, Indie | November 6, 2012 |
| Chaos Reborn | Snapshot Games Inc. | Snapshot Games Inc. | Indie, RPG, Strategy | October 26, 2015 |
| Chasing Dead | 2020 Venture | 2020 Venture | Action, Adventure, Indie | March 3, 2016 |
| Cheaters Blackjack 21 | BlackOpzFX | BlackOpzFX Labs | Casual, Simulation, Strategy | June 7, 2016 |
| Cheats 4 Hire | Travian Games GmbH | Travian Games GmbH | Strategy | June 25, 2015 |
| Chesster | Team Chesster | Surprise Attack | Indie, Simulation | March 17, 2016 |
| Chicken Invaders 2 | InterAction studios | InterAction studios | Action, Casual, Indie | March 4, 2016 |
| Chicken Invaders 3 | InterAction studios | InterAction studios | Action, Casual, Indie | June 8, 2015 |
| Chicken Invaders 4 | InterAction studios | InterAction studios | Action, Casual, Indie | June 6, 2014 |
| Chicken Invaders 5 | InterAction studios | InterAction studios | Action, Casual, Indie | March 13, 2015 |
| Children of Liberty | Lantana Games | Lantana Games | Action, Indie | April 18, 2014 |
| Chill the Piro | Sergey Marchenko | Sergey Marchenko | Action, Indie | April 28, 2016 |
| Chime Sharp | Ste Curran | Chilled Mouse | Casual | July 19, 2016 |
| Chivalry: Medieval Warfare | Torn Banner Studios | Torn Banner Studios | Action, Indie | October 16, 2012 |
| CHKN | Katapult | Katapult | Adventure, Casual, Indie | April 1, 2016 |
| Choice of Alexandria | Choice of Games | Choice of Games | Adventure, Indie, RPG | June 10, 2016 |
| Choice of Kung Fu | Choice of Games | Choice of Games | Indie, RPG | December 19, 2012 |
| Choice of Robots | Choice of Games | Choice of Games | Indie, RPG | December 19, 2014 |
| Choice of the Deathless | Choice of Games | Choice of Games | Indie, RPG | December 20, 2013 |
| Choice of the Petal Throne | Choice of Games | Choice of Games | Indie, RPG | April 10, 2015 |
| Choice of the Pirate | Choice of Games | Choice of Games | Adventure, Indie, RPG | May 20, 2016 |
| Chroma Squad | Behold Studios | Behold Studios | Indie, RPG, Strategy | April 30, 2015 |
| ChromaGun | Pixel Maniacs | Pixel Maniacs | Action, Adventure, Indie | February 16, 2016 |
| Chronoclysm | Zed-ex | Zed-ex | Action, Indie | November 12, 2015 |
| Chuck's Challenge 3D | Niffler Ltd. | Nkidu Games Inc. | Indie | February 28, 2014 |
| Circa Infinity | Kenny Sun | Kenny Sun | Action, Indie | September 9, 2015 |
| Circuit Breakers | Triverske | Triverske | Action | November 17, 2015 |
| Circuits | Digital Tentacle | Digital Tentacle | Casual, Indie | April 17, 2014 |
| Cities in Motion | Colossal Order Ltd. | Paradox Interactive | Simulation | February 22, 2011 |
| Cities in Motion 2 | Colossal Order Ltd. | Paradox Interactive | Simulation, Strategy | April 2, 2013 |
| Cities: Skylines | Colossal Order | Paradox Interactive | City-building | March 10, 2015 |
| City Quest | Stone Monkey Studios | Stone Monkey Studios | Adventure, Indie | August 20, 2015 |
| City Z | Little Cloud Games | Little Cloud Games | Action, Indie | April 29, 2016 |
| Civilization V | Firaxis Games | 2K Games, Aspyr | Turn-based strategy | September 21, 2010 |
| Civilization V: Brave New World | Firaxis Games | 2K Games, Aspyr | Turn-based strategy | March 15, 2013 |
| Civilization V: Gods & Kings | Firaxis Games | 2K Games, Aspyr | Turn-based strategy | February 16, 2012 |
| Civilization VI | Firaxis Games | 2K Games, Aspyr | Turn-based strategy | February 9, 2017 |
| Civilization VI: Rise and Fall | Firaxis Games | 2K Games, Aspyr | Turn-based strategy | February 8, 2018 |
| Civilization VII | Firaxis Games | 2K Games | Turn-based strategy | February 11, 2025 |
| Clock Simulator | Kool2Play | Kool2Play | Indie | July 20, 2016 |
| Clockwork Tales: Of Glass and Ink | Artifex Mundi | Artifex Mundi | Adventure, Casual | August 8, 2013 |
| Cloney | dotBunny | dotBunny | Casual, Indie | March 15, 2014 |
| Closure | Eyebrow Interactive | Eyebrow Interactive | Indie | September 7, 2012 |
| Clown House (Palyaço Evi) | gord10 | Aslan Game Studio | Action, Indie | July 14, 2015 |
| Club Life | Dharker Studio | Dharker Studio | Adventure, Casual, Indie | April 13, 2016 |
| Cluck Yegger in Escape From The Planet of the Poultroid | Guys From Andromeda LLC | Guys From Andromeda LLC | Action, Casual, Strategy | November 9, 2015 |
| ClusterPuck 99 | PHL Collective | PHL Collective | Indie, Sports | January 23, 2015 |
| CO-OP : Decrypted | Pixelz Games | Pixelz Games | Adventure, Indie | April 6, 2015 |
| Coated | mamoniem | Owlnight | Indie | August 25, 2015 |
| Codename CURE | Hoobalugalar X | Hoobalugalar_X | Action | July 17, 2015 |
| Coffee Pot Terrarium | Brothers Flint | Brothers Flint | Indie, Strategy | June 1, 2016 |
| Coffin Dodgers | Milky Tea Studios | Milky Tea Studios | Action, Casual, Indie | July 8, 2015 |
| Cogs | Lazy 8 Studios | N/A | Indie, Casual | April 14, 2009 |
| Collider | Binary Cocoa | Binary Cocoa | Action, Casual, Indie | March 1, 2016 |
| Color By | Team Polykroma | Polykroma Games | Indie | January 21, 2016 |
| Color Symphony 2 | REMIMORY | REMIMORY | Action, Indie | October 16, 2015 |
| Color Syndrome | Thrill Pill Games | Thrill Pill Games | Casual, Indie, Strategy | June 20, 2016 |
| Colortone | Kirill Belman | Kirill Belman | Adventure, Indie | October 29, 2015 |
| Command HQ | Ozark Softscape | Retroism | Strategy | January 1, 1990 |
| Commander Cool 2 | Orlyapps | Orlyapps | Action, Indie | December 17, 2015 |
| Community College Hero: Trial by Fire | Hosted Games | Hosted Games | Indie, RPG | December 4, 2015 |
| Company of Heroes 2 | Relic Entertainment | Sega | Strategy | June 25, 2013 |
| Conan the mighty pig | Mihai Moroșanu | Mihai Moroșanu | Action, Adventure | June 28, 2016 |
| Concrete and Steel | Matterhorn Software LTD | Matterhorn Software LTD | Indie, Simulation | May 27, 2016 |
| Conflicks - Revolutionary Space Battles | Artifice Studio | Artifice Studio | Action, Casual, Indie | November 5, 2015 |
| Conquest of Elysium 3 | Illwinter Game Design | Illwinter Game Design | Indie, Strategy | October 24, 2012 |
| Conquest of Elysium 4 | Illwinter Game Design | Illwinter Game Design | Indie, Strategy | November 16, 2015 |
| Costume Quest | Double Fine Productions | Double Fine Productions | Role-playing | May 8, 2013 |
| Counter-Strike | Valve | Valve | FPS | June 19, 1999 |
| Counter-Strike: Condition Zero | Valve, Gearbox Software, Ritual Entertainment, Turtle Rock Studios | Valve | FPS | March 23, 2004 |
| Counter-Strike: Source | Valve | Valve | FPS | November 1, 2004 |
| Counter-Strike: Global Offensive | Valve | Valve | FPS | August 21, 2012 |
| Counter-Strike 2 | Valve | Valve | FPS | September 27, 2023 |
| Crusader Kings II | Paradox Development Studio | Paradox Interactive | Grand Strategy | February 14, 2012 |
| Crusader Kings III | Paradox Development Studio | Paradox Interactive | Grand Strategy | September 1, 2020 |

=== D ===
| Name | Developer | Publisher | Genres | Date released |
|---|---|---|---|---|
| Dead Island | Techland | Deep Silver | Action role-playing, survival horror | September 6, 2011 |
| Dead Maze | Atelier 801 | Atelier 801 | Massively multiplayer online, survival | February 13, 2018 |
| DEFCON | Introversion Software | Introversion Software | Strategy | September 29, 2006 |
| Delver | Priority Interrupt | Priority Interrupt | Roguelike | February 1, 2018 |
| Democracy 3 | Positech Games | Positech Games | Strategy, Simulation | October 24, 2013 |
| Divinity: Original Sin (Enhanced Edition) | Larian Studios | Larian Studios | Role-playing | December 23, 2015 |
| Don't Starve | Klei Entertainment | Klei Entertainment | Action-adventure, Survival, Roguelike | April 23, 2013 |
| Deus Ex: Mankind Divided | Eidos-Montréal | Feral Interactive | Action role-playing, First-person shooter, Stealth | November 3, 2016 |
| Doom 3 | id Software | Activision | FPS, survival horror | October 1, 2004 |
| Dota 2 | Valve | Valve | ARTS | July 9, 2013 |
| Dude, Where Is My Beer? | Arik Games | | Point-and-click, Indie | November 5, 2020 |
| Duke Nukem 3D | 3D Realms | GT Interactive, Devolver Digital | FPS | September 4, 2013 (Linux) |
| Dustforce | Hitbox Team | Digerati Distribution | Platform | September 18, 2012 (Linux) |
| Dwarf Fortress | Tarn Adams | Bay 12 Games | City-building game, Roguelike | August 8, 2006 |
| Dying Light | Techland | Warner Bros. Interactive Entertainment | Survival Horror, Action role-playing | January 27, 2015 |

=== E ===
| Name | Developer | Publisher | Genres | Date released |
|---|---|---|---|---|
| Eulora | Ministry of Games | S.MG | Bitcoin-VE, MMO | August 3, 2016 |
| Endgame: Singularity | Emhsoft | | RTS | May 9, 2005 |
| Empire: Total War | The Creative Assembly, Feral Interactive | Sega, Feral Interactive | RTS | March 3, 2009 |
| Enemy Territory: Quake Wars | Splash Damage | Activision | First-person shooter | September 28, 2007 |
| Euro Truck Simulator 2 | SCS Software | SCS Software | Simulation | January 16, 2013 |
| Europa Universalis IV | Paradox Development Studio | Paradox Interactive | Grand Strategy, Historical | August 13, 2013 |
| Expeditions: Conquistador | Logic Artists | BitComposer | Tactical role-playing game | May 30, 2013 |
| Extreme Tux Racer | ETR Team | ETR Team | Racing | October 7, 2000 |

=== F ===
| Name | Developer | Publisher | Genres | Date released |
|---|---|---|---|---|
| F1 2015 | Feral Interactive | Feral Interactive | Racing | July 2015 |
| Factorio | Wube Software | Wube Software | Action, Indie, Real-time strategy, Survival | 14 August 2020 |
| Fall of Gyes | Black Cloud Studios | Black Cloud Studios | Visual novel | March 18, 2016 |
| Firewatch | Campo Santo | Panic | Adventure | Feb 9, 2016 |
| Fistful of Frags | Fistful of Frags Team | Fistful of Frags Team | FPS, Indie, Western | May 9, 2014 |
| Fortoresse | Atelier 801 | Atelier 801 | Indie | March 14, 2014 |
| Fruit Man Adventures | Clikin Games | Clikin Games | Platformer, Indie | June 24, 2019 |
| FTL: Faster Than Light | Subset Games | Subset Games | Real-time strategy | September 14, 2012 |

=== G ===
| Name | Developer | Publisher | Genres | Date released |
|---|---|---|---|---|
| Gang Beasts | Boneloaf | Double Fine Productions | Beat 'em up, Party | December 12, 2017 |
| Garry's Mod | Facepunch Studios | Valve | Sandbox, Physics | December 24, 2004 |
| Ghost Blade HD | HUCAST | HUCAST | Action | March 8, 2017 |
| Ghost Control Inc. | Bumblebee | Bumblebee | Turn-based strategy, Indie | December 13, 2013 |
| "Glow Ball" - The billiard puzzle game | WTFOMGames | WTFOMGames | Sports, Indie | February 19, 2014 |
| Goat Simulator | Coffee Stain Studios | Coffee Stain Studios | Action | April 1, 2014 |
| Golf With Your Friends | Blacklight Interactive | Team17 | Sports | May 19, 2020 |
| Gone Home | The Fullbright Company | The Fullbright Company | Walking simulator | August 15, 2013 |
| GRID Autosport | Codemasters | Codemasters | Racing | June 24, 2014 (Linux: December 10, 2015) |
| Grim Fandango Remastered | Double Fine Productions | Double Fine Productions | Adventure, Point-and-click | January 27, 2015 |

=== H ===
| Name | Developer | Publisher | Genres | Date released |
|---|---|---|---|---|
| Half-Life | Valve, Gearbox Software | Sierra Entertainment | FPS | November 8, 1998 |
| Half-Life 2 | Valve | Valve | FPS | November 16, 2004 |
| Hatoful Boyfriend | PigeoNation Inc., Mediatonic (remake) | Devolver Digital | Visual novel | September 4, 2014 |
| Hearts of Iron IV | Paradox Development Studio | Paradox Interactive | Grand strategy wargame | June 6, 2016 |
| Heroes of Newerth | S2 Games | S2 Games | Multiplayer online battle arena | May 12, 2010 |
| Hitman | IO Interactive | Feral Interactive | Stealth | February 16, 2017 |
| Hollow Knight | Team Cherry | Team Cherry | Action-adventure | February 24, 2017 |
| Hollow Knight: Silksong | Team Cherry | Team Cherry | Action-adventure | September 4, 2025 |
| Hotline Miami | Dennaton Games | Devolver Digital | Top-down, Action | October 23, 2012 |
| Hotline Miami 2: Wrong Number | Dennaton Games, Abstraction Games | Devolver Digital | Top-down, Action | March 10, 2015 |
| Human Resource Machine | Tomorrow Corporation | Tomorrow Corporation | Puzzle | March 29, 2016 |
| HuniePop | HuniePot | HuniePot | Dating sim, tile-matching | January 19, 2015 |
| Hypnospace Outlaw | Tendershoot | No More Robots | Simulation, Puzzle | March 12, 2019 |

=== I ===
| Name | Developer | Publisher | Genres | Date released |
|---|---|---|---|---|
| Intrusion 2 | Aleksey Abramenko | Aleksey Abramenko | Platformer | September 11, 2012 |

=== J ===
| Name | Developer | Publisher | Genres | Date released |
|---|---|---|---|---|
| Jagged Alliance: Back in Action | Bigmoon Studios | bitComposer, Kalypso Media | Turn-based tactics | February 14, 2014 |
| Jagged Alliance: Flashback | Full Control | Full Control | Turn-based tactics | October 21, 2014 |
| Joe Danger 2: The Movie | Hello Games | Hello Games | Action | June 24, 2013 |

=== K ===
| Name | Developer | Publisher | Genres | Date released |
|---|---|---|---|---|
| Kerbal Space Program | Squad | Squad | Space flight simulator | April 27, 2015 |
| Katawa Shoujo | Four Leaf Studios | Four Leaf Studios | Visual novel | January 4, 2012 |
| Kona | Parabole | Parabole | Action-adventure | March 24, 2016 |
| Kindergarten | Con Man Games, Sean Young | SmashGames | Puzzle, adventure | July 2017 |
| Kingdom Draw | Eternal Technics | Eternal Technics | Turn Based Strategy | August 2, 2022 |

=== L ===
| Name | Developer | Publisher | Genres | Date released |
|---|---|---|---|---|
| Left 4 Dead 2 | Valve | Valve (Steam), Electronic Arts (retail) | FPS | November 16, 2009 |
| Legend of Grimrock | Almost Human Ltd. | Almost Human Ltd. | Action role-playing | December 19, 2012 |
| Life Is Strange | Feral Interactive | Feral Interactive | Graphic adventure | July 21, 2016 |
| Limbo | Playdead | Playdead, Microsoft Game Studios | Puzzle, Platform | July 21, 2010 |
| Linux Air Combat | Robert Bosen | AskMisterWizard.com | Flight Simulator | Nov 21, 2019 |
| Lovers in a Dangerous Spacetime | Asteroid Base | Asteroid Base | Action, Platform | September 9, 2015 |

=== M ===
| Name | Developer | Publisher | Genres | Date released |
|---|---|---|---|---|
| Mad Max | Feral Interactive | Feral Interactive | Action-adventure, open world | October 20, 2016 |
| Magicite | SmashGames | SmashGames | Action, adventure, indie, rpg | June 9, 2014 |
| Maelstrom | Ambrosia Software | Ambrosia Software | Shooter | November 1992 |
| Magic Circle | Question | Question | Sandbox game, fps | July 9, 2015 |
| Maldita Castilla | Locomalito | Locomalito | Platformer, action | December 12, 2012 |
| Marvel Cosmic Invasion | Tribute Games | Dotemu | Beat 'em up | December 1, 2025 |
| Metro: 2033 Redux | 4A Games | Deep Silver | FPS | March 16, 2010 |
| Metro: Last Light Redux | 4A Games | Deep Silver | FPS | May 14, 2013 |
| Mighty No. 9 | Deep Silver | Comcept | Action, platform | August 24, 2016 |
| Minecraft: Java Edition | Mojang | Mojang | Sandbox, survival | November 18, 2011 |
| Minit | Jan Willem Nijman, Kitty Calis, Jukio Kallio, Dominik Johann | Devolver Digital | Adventure | April 3, 2018 |
| Middle-earth: Shadow of Mordor | Monolith Productions | Feral Interactive, Warner Bros. Interactive Entertainment | Action-adventure | September 30, 2014 |
| MirrorMoon EP | Santa Ragione | Santa Ragione | Adventure | September 4, 2013 |
| Missed Messages | Angela He | Angela He | Visual novel | May 1, 2019 |
| Momodora: Reverie Under The Moonlight | Bombservice | Playism | Metroidvania | February 16, 2018 |
| Mount and Blade: Warband | TaleWorlds Entertainment | TaleWorlds Entertainment | Action-RPG, Strategy, Simulation | March 30, 2010 |
| Mountain | David O'Reily | Double Fine Productions | Casual | July 1, 2014 |

=== N ===
| Name | Developer | Publisher | Genres | Date released |
|---|---|---|---|---|
| Natural Selection 2 | Unknown Worlds Entertainment | Unknown Worlds Entertainment | FPS, RTS | October 31, 2012 |
| Nebuchadnezzar | Nepos Games | Nepos Games | City-building | February 17, 2021 |
| Nekodancer | Atelier 801 | Atelier 801 | | July 24, 2014 |
| Nexuiz | Alientrap | Alientrap | FPS | May 31, 2005 |
| Night in the Woods | Infinite Fall | Finji | Adventure | February 21, 2017 |
| Nuclear Dawn | InterWave Studios, GameConnect | Iceberg Interactive | FPS, RTS | September 26, 2011 |

=== O ===
| Name | Developer | Publisher | Genres | Date released |
|---|---|---|---|---|
| Oil Rush | Unigine Corp | Iceberg Interactive | Strategy, Tower Defense | January 25, 2012 |
| OlliOlli | Roll7 | Roll7 | Sports | July 22, 2014 |
| OlliOlli2: Welcome to Olliwood | Roll7 | Roll7, Devolver Digital | Sports | August 11, 2015 |
| OneShot | Little Cat Feet | Degica | Adventure, Puzzle | December 9, 2016 |
| osu! | osu! development team | self-published | Rhythm game | September 16, 2007 |
| Outlast | Red Barrels | Red Barrels | Survival horror | September 4, 2013 |
| OpenArena | Free software community | Free software community | FPS | August 19, 2005 |
| OpenTTD | OpenTTD Team | OpenTTD Team | Business simulation game | October 22, 2014 |
| Open Trial | VVPix | VVPix | Sport | May 18, 2019 |
| Octodad: Dadliest Catch | Young Horses | Young Horses | Action, Adventure, Indie | January 30, 2014 |

=== P ===
| Name | Developer | Publisher | Genres | Date released |
|---|---|---|---|---|
| Painkiller: Hell & Damnation | The Farm 51 | Nordic Games | First-person shooter | October 31, 2012 |
| Paleo Pines | Italic Pig | Modus Games | Farm life sim | September 23, 2023 |
| Parkitect | Texel Raptor | Texel Raptor | Construction and management simulation | May 5, 2016 (Steam Early Access) |
| Pikuniku | Sectordub | Devolver Digital | Puzzle, Adventure | January 24, 2019 |
| Pillars of Eternity | Obsidian Entertainment | Paradox Interactive | Role-playing | March 26, 2015 |
| Pioneer | | | Space flight simulation game | 2006 |
| Planetary Annihilation | Uber Entertainment | Uber Entertainment | Real-time strategy | September 5, 2014 |
| Portal | Valve | Valve | Puzzle, First Person | October 10, 2007 |
| Portal 2 | Valve | Valve | Puzzle, Co-op, First Person | April 18, 2011 |
| Postal | Running with Scissors | Ripcord Games | Isometric, Third-person shooter | September 30, 1997 |
| Postal 2 | Running with Scissors | Running with Scissors | First-person shooter | April 13, 2003 |
| Postal Redux | Running with Scissors | Running with Scissors | Isometric, Third-person shooter | May 20, 2016 |
| Prison Architect | Introversion Software | Introversion Software | Construction and management simulation | October 6, 2015 |
| Psychonauts | Double Fine Productions | Double Fine Productions | Platform, Action-adventure | June 12, 2012 |
| Psychonauts 2 | Double Fine Productions | Microsoft | Platform, Action-adventure | May 4, 2022 |
| PULSAR: Lost Colony | Leafy Games | Leafy Games | First-person shooter | June 23, 2021 |

=== Q ===
| Name | Developer | Publisher | Genres | Date released |
|---|---|---|---|---|
| Quake | id Software | GT Interactive | FPS | June 22, 1996 |

=== R ===
| Name | Developer | Publisher | Genres | Date released |
|---|---|---|---|---|
| Reassembly | Arthur Danskin | Anisoptera Games | Open world, Strategy, Shooter, Simulation | February 19, 2015 |
| Return to Monkey Island | Terrible Toybox | Devolver Digital | Graphic adventure | October 25, 2022 |
| RimWorld | Ludeon Studios | Ludeon Studios | City-building game, Roguelike | January 14, 2014 |
| Rise of Industry | Dapper Penguin Studios | Kasedo Games | Business simulation game | May 2, 2019 |
| Rise of the Tomb Raider | Crystal Dynamics | Feral Interactive | Action-adventure | August 19, 2018 |
| Road Redemption | EQ Games, Pixel Dash Studios | EQ Games, Pixel Dash Studios | Vehicular combat, Racing | October 4, 2017 |
| Rochard | Recoil Games | Recoil Games | Action, Casual, Indie | November 15, 2011 |
| Ruffy and the Riverside | Zockrates Laboratories UG | Phiphen Games | Platformer, Action, Puzzle | June 26, 2025 |

=== S ===
| Name | Developer | Publisher | Genres | Date released |
|---|---|---|---|---|
| S&box | Facepunch Studios | Facepunch Studios | Sandbox | September 1, 2026 |
| Serious Sam 3: BFE | Croteam | Devolver Digital | First-person shooter | December 20, 2012 |
| Shadow of the Tomb Raider | Eidos Montréal | Square Enix Europe | Action-adventure | November 5, 2019 |
| Shadowrun Returns | Harebrained Schemes | Harebrained Schemes | Tactical role-playing game | October 30, 2013 |
| Shadow Warrior | Flying Wild Hog | Devolver Digital | First-person shooter | September 26, 2013 |
| Shank 2 | Klei Entertainment | Klei Entertainment | Action, Adventure, Indie | February 2, 2012 |
| Shift Happens | Klonk Games | Deck13 | Jump'n'Run, Puzzle, Co-op | February 22, 2017 |
| Shovel Knight | Yacht Club Games | Yacht Club Games | Action, Adventure, Indie | June 26, 2014 |
| Sid Meier's Civilization: Beyond Earth | Firaxis Games | 2K Games, Aspyr Media | 4X | October 23, 2014 (for Linux/SteamOS) |
| Sid Meier's Civilization V | Firaxis Games | 2K Games, Aspyr Media | 4X | June 10, 2014 (for Linux/SteamOS) |
| SimCity 3000 | Maxis | Electronic Arts | Construction and Management Simulation, City-building game | January 31, 1999 |
| SiN | Hyperion Entertainment | Activision | First-person shooter | November 2000 |
| Slay the Spire | Mega Crit | Mega Crit | Roguelike deck-building | January 23, 2019 |
| Slime Rancher | Monomi Park | Monomi Park | Farm life sim | August 1, 2017 |
| Smokin' Guns | Iron Claw Interactive, Smokin' Guns Productions | Iron Claw Interactive, Smokin' Guns Productions | FPS, Western | June 8, 2012 (standalone) |
| SOMA | Frictional Games | Frictional Games | Survival Horror, FPS | September 22, 2015 |
| Space Hulk | Full Control | Full Control | Turn-based tactics | January 29, 2014 |
| Space Hulk: Ascension | Full Control | Full Control | Turn-based tactics | November 12, 2014 |
| Spec Ops: The Line | Yager Development | 2K Games | Third-person shooter | June 26, 2012 |
| Starbound | Chucklefish | Chucklefish | Adventure | December 4, 2013 (beta) |
| Stardew Valley | ConcernedApe | ConcernedApe | Simulation, Role-playing | February 26, 2016 |
| Star Wars Knights of the Old Republic II: The Sith Lords | Obsidian Entertainment | LucasArts | Role-playing | February 8, 2005 |
| Stellaris | Obsidian Entertainment | LucasArts | 4X, Grand strategy | May 9, 2016 |
| Streets of Rage 4 | Dotemu, Lizardcube, Guard Crush Games | Dotemu | Beat 'em up | November 12, 2020 |
| Super Meat Boy | Team Meat | Team Meat | Platform | December 13, 2011 |
| SuperTux | Bill Kendrick, SuperTux development team | SuperTux development team | Platform | April 11, 2000 |
| Surgeon Simulator 2013 | Bossa Studios | Bossa Studios | Simulation | April 19, 2013 |
| Steno Arcade | For All To Play | For All To Play | Casual, Free to Play, Indie, Early Access | March 30, 2016 |
| Super Woden GP | ViJuDa | ViJuDa | Racing | September 1, 2021 |

=== T ===
| Name | Developer | Publisher | Genres | Date released |
|---|---|---|---|---|
| Tallowmere | Chris McFarland | Chris McFarland | Action, Platformer, Rogue-lite | March 3, 2015 |
| Tibia | CipSoft | CipSoft | MMORPG | January 1997 |
| The Dark Mod | Broken Glass Studios | Broken Glass Studios | Stealth | October 8, 2013 (standalone) |
| The Talos Principle | Croteam | Devolver Digital | Puzzle | December 11, 2014 |
| They Bleed Pixels | Spooky Squid Games | Spooky Squid Games | Platform, Beat 'em up | August 29, 2012 |
| Team Fortress Classic | Valve | Valve | FPS | April 7, 1999 |
| Team Fortress 2 | Valve | Valve | FPS | October 10, 2007 |
| Teenage Mutant Ninja Turtles: Shredder's Revenge | Tribute Games | Dotemu | Beat 'em up | June 16, 2022 |
| Terraria | Re-Logic | Re-Logic | Action-adventure, Survival | May 16, 2011 |
| Terroid | Digital Nightmares | Schenk & Horn | Action | June 1997 |
| The Battle for Wesnoth | David White and others | David White and others | Turn-based strategy | October 2005 |
| The Binding of Isaac: Rebirth | Nicalis, Inc., Edmund McMillen | Nicalis, Inc. | Action-adventure, Dungeon crawler, Roguelike | November 4, 2014 |
| Titan Attacks | Puppy Games | Puppy Games | Action, Casual, Indie | February 3, 2012 |
| Tomb Raider | Crystal Dynamics, Feral Interactive | Feral Interactive | Action, Adventure | April 29, 2016 |
| Tomb Rumble | Atelier 801 | Atelier 801 | Massively multiplayer online, Platform | September 15, 2021 |
| Torchlight | Runic Games | Runic Games | Action RPG, Hack and Slash | October 27, 2009 |
| Torchlight 2 | Runic Games | Runic Games | Action RPG, Hack and Slash | September 20, 2012 |
| Transformice | Atelier 801 | Atelier 801 | Massively multiplayer online, Platform | May 1, 2010 |
| Tremulous | Dark Legion Development | Dark Legion Development | FPS, RTS | August 11, 2006 (standalone) |
| Trine | Frozenbyte | Frozenbyte | Action, Adventure | June 6, 2009 |
| Trine 2 | Frozenbyte | Frozenbyte | Action, Adventure | July 2, 2013 |
| TripleA | Kevin Comcowich (ComradeKev), Mark Christopher Duncan (Veqryn), Wisconsin | | Wargame, Strategy | January 21, 2017 |
| Tropico 5 | Haemimont Games | Kalypso Media | Construction and management simulation, Political simulation game | September 19, 2014 |

=== U ===
| Name | Developer | Publisher | Genres | Date released |
|---|---|---|---|---|
| Ultratron | Puppy Games | Puppy Games | Action, Indie | March 18, 2013 |
| Undertale | Toby Fox | Toby Fox | RPG, Indie | July 17, 2016 |
| UnderMine | Thorium | Fandom | Action-adventure | August 20, 2019 |
| Unity Of Command | 2x2 Games | 2x2 Games, Dvaput | Turn Based Strategy, Second World War | November 15, 2011 |
| UnityStation | UnityStation Community | UnityStation Org | RPG, Multiplayer, Simulation | February 2020 |
| Unreal Tournament | Epic Games, Digital Extremes | GT Interactive | FPS | November 30, 1999 |
| Unvanquished | Unvanquished Development | Unvanquished Development | FPS, RTS | February 29, 2012 |

=== V ===
| Name | Developer | Publisher | Genres | Date released |
|---|---|---|---|---|
| VVVVVV | Terry Cavanagh | Terry Cavanagh | Puzzle platformer | September 7, 2010 |
| Vertex Steve | Marko Krsic | Marko Krsic | 2D Platform Shooter | September 21, 2021 |
| VCMI (Heroes 3 engine rewrite) | many contributors | self-published | TBS | 2022, still updates |

=== W ===
| Name | Developer | Publisher | Genres | Date released |
|---|---|---|---|---|
| Warhammer 40,000: Dawn of War II | Feral Interactive | Feral Interactive | Tactical role-playing, Real-time tactics, RTS | September 29, 2016 |
| Warhammer 40,000: Dawn of War II - Chaos Rising | Feral Interactive | Feral Interactive | Tactical role-playing, Real-time tactics, RTS | September 29, 2016 |
| Warhammer 40,000: Dawn of War II - Retribution | Feral Interactive | Feral Interactive | Tactical role-playing, Real-time tactics, RTS | September 29, 2016 |
| Warhammer 40,000: Gladius – Relics of War | Proxy Studios | Slitherine Software | Turn-based strategy, 4X | July 12, 2018 |
| Warhammer 40,000: Mechanicus | Bulwark Studios | Kasedo Games | Turn-based tactics | November 15, 2018 |
| Warhammer Quest | Chilled Mouse | Games Workshop | RPG, Strategy, Board Game | January 7, 2015 |
| War Thunder | Gaijin Entertainment | Gaijin Entertainment | MMO, Flight Simulator | November 6, 2014 |
| Warzone 2100 | Pumpkin Studios | Eidos Interactive | Real-time strategy | January 30, 2012 |
| Wasteland 2 | inXile Entertainment, Obsidian Entertainment | inXile Entertainment | Role-playing | September 19, 2014 |
| Wheels of Aurelia | Santa Ragione S.r.l. | Santa Ragione S.r.l. | Visual Novel | September 20, 2016 |
| Widelands | Widelands Development Team | Widelands Development Team | Widelands | May 2, 2019 |
| The Witcher 2: Assassins of Kings | CD Projekt Red | CyberFront | Action role-playing | May 17, 2011 |
| Wonder Boy: The Dragon's Trap | Lizardcube | Dotemu | Platform, Action-adventure | July 18, 2017 |
| World of Goo | 2D Boy | 2D Boy | Puzzle | February 12, 2009 |
| World of Goo 2 | 2D Boy | 2D Boy | Puzzle | August 2, 2024 |
| Worms Reloaded | Team17 | Team17 | Artillery, Strategy | October 15, 2013 |
| Worms W.M.D | Team17 | Team17 | Artillery, Strategy | August 23, 2016 |

=== X ===
| Name | Developer | Publisher | Genres | Date released |
|---|---|---|---|---|
| XBill | Brian Wellington, Matías Duarte | Brian Wellington, Matías Duarte | Arcade | July 21, 1994 |
| XCOM: Enemy Unknown | Firaxis, Feral Interactive | 2K | Turn-based Strategy | October 11, 2012 |
| XCOM: Enemy Within | Firaxis, Feral Interactive | 2K | Turn-based Strategy | June 19, 2014 |
| XCOM 2 | Firaxis, Feral Interactive | 2K | Turn-based Strategy | February 5, 2016 |
| Xenonauts | Goldhawk Interactive | Goldhawk Interactive | Turn-based Strategy | June 17, 2014 |
| Xonotic | Team Xonotic | Team Xonotic | FPS | September 8, 2011 |
| X-Plane (simulator) | Austin Meyers | Laminar Research | Flight Sim/Physic Engine | September 16, 2022 |

=== Y ===
| Name | Developer | Publisher | Genres | Date released |
|---|---|---|---|---|
| Yooka-Laylee | Playtonic Games | Team17 | Platform-adventure | April 11, 2017 |

=== Z ===
| Name | Developer | Publisher | Genres | Date released |
|---|---|---|---|---|
| Zero-K | 0K Development Team | 0K Development Team | Real-time strategy | December 20, 2010 |
| Zoria: Age of Shattering | Tiny Trinket Games | Anshar Publishing | Role-playing | March 7, 2024 |

== See also ==
- List of PC games
- List of freeware
- Lists of video games
