= Caffeine (disambiguation) =

Caffeine is an alkaloid present in certain plants, such as coffee and tea.

Caffeine may also refer to:

== Music ==
- Caffeine (album), by the eponymous free improvisation trio
- Caféine, a 2009 album by Christophe Willem
- Caffeine, a 2023 EP by Jack Kays
- "Caffeine", a song by Patty Larkin on her 1987 album I'm Fine
- "Caffeine", a song by Faith No More on their 1992 album Angel Dust
- "Caffeine", a song by The Dillinger Escape Plan on their debut EP The Dillinger Escape Plan
- "Caffeine", a song by Jeff Williams & Casey Lee Williams on their album RWBY: Volume 2 Soundtrack
- "Caffeine", a song by Psychostick on their 2006 album, Sandwich
- "Caffeine", a song by Yang Yo-seob on his first EP The First Collage

== Other uses ==
- Caffeine (coffeehouse chain), a European cafe chain
- Caffeine (film)
- Caffeine (service), a livestreaming service
- Caffeine (video game)
- Google Caffeine, a redesigned Google search architecture

== See also ==
- Cathine, a psychoactive drug
- Kaffeine, media player software for KDE
