= Attractio =

2016 video game

- Developers: GameCoder Studios; Renderfarm Studios
- Publisher: Bandai Namco Entertainment
- Engine: Custom
- Platforms: Windows, Mac, Linux, PlayStation 4, Vita
- Release: 19 January 2016
- Genre: Puzzle-platform
- Mode: Single-player

Attractio is a puzzle-platform game by Mexican developers GameCoder Studios, Renderfarm Studios and publisher Bandai Namco Entertainment. Attractio takes place in the Entertainment Space Station (ESS), an artificial satellite orbiting Mars where players will solve deadly physics-based puzzles using gadgets that manipulate gravity. This futuristic puzzle platformer draws its gameplay inspiration from games like Portal, while also being inspired by futuristic stories like those similar to Running Man. The game received mixed reviews. It was the first video game developed in Latin America to be published globally by Bandai Namco Entertainment,

== Development ==
The game was first announced for Steam Greenlight in 2013, and successfully "Greenlit" the following year. Shortly after, the developers announced the game was now being published (after improvements) by Bandai Namco Entertainment, an early access of Attractio, supporting Windows and already with plans for the Oculus Rift, was available: "GameCoder Studios has announced that its indie first-person puzzle title, Attractio, will be launching via early access on Thursday, 20th March."

The music was composed by Novelli Jurado. He mixed electronic music with classical and tribal textures gathering a variety range of emotions. With this work he is the first latinamerican composer whose work was distributed worldwide by Japanese renown company Bandai-Namco for PlayStation 4, PlayStation Vita, and Steam.

=== Attractio and Bandai Namco partnership (2015–2016) ===
In 2015, GameCoder Studios presented a prototype of Attractio at a Sony industry event. The game's mechanics, based on gravity manipulation, secured a publishing deal with Bandai Namco Entertainment. This agreement marked a milestone for the regional industry, as Attractio became the first Latin American video game to be distributed globally by the Japanese publisher for PlayStation 4, PlayStation Vita, and PC.

The game was released in January 2016. Critical reception was mixed; while outlets like Hardcore Gamer praised the complexity of its puzzles, other publications such as Destructoid criticized the narrative and production values.

== Reception ==
Reception

Review scores
Publication	Score
Hardcore Gamer	3.5/5
The Escapist	3/5
Push Square	5/10
GameRevolution	4/10

Attractio has received mixed reviews from critics.

Thomas Ella of Hardcore Gamer gave the game a 3.5 out of 5 saying, "There's not a lot about Attractio to pull you in from a distance. It doesn't look, sound or even feel that great. Its story is obvious and uninteresting. Everything about it screams “knockoff” like a “ROLAX” watch, but don't be fooled: if you're a fiend for devious puzzles, Attractio is the real deal." Mitchell Saltzman from The Escapist rated the game a 3/5 saying, "Die-hard puzzle fans that are always on the lookout for ways to give their brain a workout may want to give Attractio a shot. Others may not be willing to look past the game's glaring surface flaws."

== Awards ==
Concurso Nacional de Videojuegos MX (2015): 2nd Place for Attractio.

== GameCoder Studios ==
GameCoder Studios
- Type: Private
- Industry: Video game industry
- Founded: November 20, 2012; 12 years ago
- Founder: Marcel Stockli; Alberto Ramírez; Luis Vargas
- Headquarters: Guanajuato City, Guanajuato, Mexico
- Products: Attractio; Sophie's Guardian
- Services: Video game development, Porting, Co-development
- Website: gamecoderstudios.com

GameCoder Studios (registered as GC Studios S.A. de C.V.) is a Mexican video game developer based in Guanajuato City, Mexico, and best known for developing Attractio. Founded in 2012, the company specializes in the creation of original intellectual property, virtual reality (VR) experiences, and provides co-development and porting services for consoles and PC. It is also known for its technical contributions to franchises such as Nickelodeon All-Star Brawl and PBA Pro Bowling 2026.

=== History ===
GameCoder Studios was founded on November 20, 2012, in Guanajuato by Marcel Stockli, Alberto Ramírez, and Luis Vargas. The founders, engineers with previous experience in the technology sector, established the studio in the Bajio region with the aim of fostering local software development. During its early years, the team focused on low-level engineering, developing a proprietary game engine initially known as GC Engine, which was later registered as the Lodestone Engine.

Following the release of Attractio, the studio expanded into virtual reality (VR) development. In October 2016, they released Sophie's Guardian, a wave shooter survival horror game. The title was recognized as one of the first Virtual Reality video games developed in Mexico released on the Steam platform.

From 2018 onwards, GameCoder transitioned to a hybrid business model, providing "work-for-hire" and co-development services for international publishers such as GameMill Entertainment and Maximum Entertainment. The studio has contributed engineering, porting, and art assets to established franchises, including the Maximum Football expansions and character modeling for Nickelodeon All-Star Brawl.

=== Original intellectual property ===
Year	Title	Platform	Notes
2016	Attractio	PS4 & PS Vita	First LATAM game distributed globally by the publisher.
2016	Sophie's Guardian	Steam VR	First Mexican VR game in Steam.

=== Co-development and/or Work For Hire ===
Year	Title	Platform	Type
2015	Agent Awesome	Steam	Support on launch
2015	Kerbal Space Program	Steam	Support on launch
2021	Open Country	Steam	Game Development & Art Development
2021	Cris Tales	Steam, Epic Games Store, GoGG.com, and Microsoft Store	Support on launch
2021	In Sound Mind	PS5, Xbox Series X|S, and Nintendo Switch	Porting & Post-launch support
2021	Stranded Deep	Steam, PS5, and Xbox Series X|S	Game Development and Cooperative mode
2021	Nickelodeon All-Star Brawl	PS5, PS4, Xbox Series X|S, Xbox One, Nintendo Switch, and Microsoft Store	Full Art Development
2021	Nerf Legends	PS5, PS4, Xbox Series X|S, Xbox One, and Nintendo Switch	Game & AI Development
2021	Super Animal Royale	PS5, PS4, Xbox Series X|S, Xbox One, Nintendo Switch, PC and Facebook Gaming	Porting & Post-launch support
2022	Them's Fightin' Herds	PS5, PS4, Xbox Series X|S, Xbox One, and Nintendo Switch	Porting & Post-launch support
2023	Echoes of Empire	PC	Game, 2D Art, 3D Art Development
2024	Lil' Guardsman	PS5, PS4, Xbox Series X|S, Xbox One, and Nintendo Switch	Console Porting & Quality Assurance
2024	Smalland	PS5 & Xbox Series X|S	Console Porting & Crossplay programming
2024	Forgotten Runiverse	Browser	Full Development
2024	Kena: Bridge of Spirits	PS5, Xbox Series X|S, and Xbox One	Console Porting
2024	Squirrel with a Gun	PS5, and Xbox Series X|S	Console Porting
2024	Maximum Football	PS5, Xbox Series X|S, and PC	Gameplay programming & backend services
2025	PixelShire	PS5, Xbox Series X|S, and PC	Porting, Bug Fixing & Implementation
2025	Nicktoons & The Dice of Destiny	PS5, Xbox Series X|S, and PC	Porting and UI Support
2025	Pro Bowling	PS5, Xbox Series X|S, and PC	Console Porting
