= They Bleed Pixels =

2012 video game

- Developer: Spooky Squid Games
- Publisher: Spooky Squid Games
- Designers: Miguel Sternberg; Andrij Pilkiw
- Composer: Shaun Hatton
- Engine: Microsoft XNA
- Platforms: Windows, Mac OS X, Linux, Switch
- Release: Steam; August 29, 2012; Nintendo Switch; October 22, 2020
- Genre: Platform
- Mode: Single-player

They Bleed Pixels is a beat'em up platform game developed and released by Canadian indie studio Spooky Squid Games in August 2012 for Microsoft Windows via Steam. The art style is dark with gothic Lovecraftian themes.

== Gameplay ==
The player controls a young girl that must fight her way through violent nightmares

Gameplay in They Bleed Pixels focuses on platforming and combat of a notably high difficulty, comparable to games such as N+ and Super Meat Boy, in which death is common and overcoming obstacles is mostly accomplished through trial and error. Respawn points are created when the player accumulates enough blood collected from slain enemies or in-level blood pickups, and idles a certain distance away from immediate level hazards.

== Plot ==
The plot follows the events of an unnamed young girl's arrival at the Lafcadio Academy Troubled Young Ladies. She is affected by her subsequent nightmares, where she transforms into a clawed creature and traverses hostile dreamscapes full of monsters, always waking with a grimoire on her bedside table. As the game progresses, she wakes from these nightmares sporting more and more aspects of her dream-self's monstrous form in reality, and repeatedly attempts to rid herself of the book, only for it to reappear next to her the following morning.

Her nightmares are representative of the ways she tries to rid herself of the book - burying it, tossing it in a river and trying to burn it in a furnace lead to nightmares revolving around earth, water and fire respectively.

Once her fire related nightmare is over, she awakens fully transformed to a dark ritual being performed by the Headmaster of the academy, surrounded by similarly transformed girls, presumably the other students of the academy. After plunging her claws through the book and fighting through a final nightmare where she eventually shreds the 'heart' of the book, she awakens fully human and departs from the academy. However, back in the academy's library—where she originally picked up the grimoire—the remaining books continue to glow ominously...

== Development and release ==
They Bleed Pixels was the second game to be developed by the two-man team of Spooky Squid Games Inc. Originally slated to be released on XBLA, the team decided to release it on the Steam platform, hoping to reach a wider audience. It was released on August 29, 2012, on the Steam store.

A port for the Nintendo Switch was released on the eShop in October 2020.

== Reception ==
They Bleed Pixels has been generally well-received; it has been given an averaged review score of 74/100 from Metacritic. Tony Ponce of Destructoid concluded that it was "a solid game that definitely has an audience." The game has been criticized for its difficulty and awkward controls.
