= Squirrel with a Gun =

2024 video game

- Developer: Dee Dee Creations LLC
- Publisher: Maximum Entertainment
- Director: Daniel DeEntremont
- Producers: Kosmas Stocking; Mélodie Maitreheu
- Designer: Simon Jones
- Composer: Scott DeEntremont
- Engine: Unreal Engine 5
- Platforms: Windows; PlayStation 5; Xbox Series X/S; Nintendo Switch 2
- Release: Windows; August 29, 2024; PS5, Xbox Series X/S; October 15, 2024; Nintendo Switch 2 November 18, 2025
- Genre: Action-adventure
- Mode: Single-player

Squirrel with a Gun is a 2024 indie action-adventure game developed by Dee Dee Creations and published by Maximum Entertainment. It was released on August 29, 2024, on Windows, and on October 15, 2024, for the Xbox Series X/S and PlayStation 5. The player controls a squirrel that wields a gun as it escapes a secret underground facility and pesters the residents of a neighborhood. The game takes inspiration from the Yakuza franchise and Shadow of the Colossus and has been compared to games such as Untitled Goose Game and Goat Simulator.

== Gameplay ==
In Squirrel with a Gun, players take control of an ordinary squirrel that wields various firearms to navigate a suburban environment. The game is primarily a sandbox experience, where players can explore the world, interact with objects, and engage in combat with NPCs, including local residents and agents attempting to capture the squirrel. The squirrel's primary ability is using guns, of which it has a multitude of weapons that it can use ranging from pistols, shotguns, sniper rifles, and a RPG. These weapons can be used to kill the enemy "agents" that pursue the squirrel throughout the game or can be used to clear platforming puzzles that reward a collectable item, a golden acorn.

In addition to fighting enemies, players can engage in non-violent activities such as stealing food from residents or helping NPCs complete tasks. While the game's tone is humorous and chaotic, it also includes stealth elements, allowing the squirrel to sneak past enemies or set up ambushes. The squirrel also has a range of costumes it can wear.

== Plot ==
A gray squirrel breaks into a top-secret lab and mistakenly eats a special hard drive that is shaped like an acorn, enhancing its intelligence. This triggers a lockdown, prompting agents to pursue it. Upon seeing a handgun dropped nearby it, the squirrel takes it and uses it to escape the secret underground facility and cause havoc in a residential neighborhood.

As the squirrel wreaks destructive chaos, it battles against the endless agents attempting to capture it, including their leaders, Father and Mother.

== Reception ==
Reception

Aggregate scores
Aggregator	Score
Metacritic	(PC) 63/100 (Xbox) 70/100 (PS5) 64/100
OpenCritic	36% recommend

Review scores
Publication	Score
GameSpot	4/10
IGN	6/10
Push Square	7/10

The PC, Xbox Series X, and PlayStation 5 version of Squirrel with a Gun all received "mixed or average" reviews from critics, according to the review aggregation website Metacritic. Fellow review aggregator OpenCritic assessed that the game received weak approval, being recommended by only 33% of critics.

Travis Northup for IGN rated the game 6/10, praising the gameplay as a squirrel, but condemns a few technical issues faced when played. He also stated that the squirrel is "like a furry John Wick."
