= Chicken Invaders =

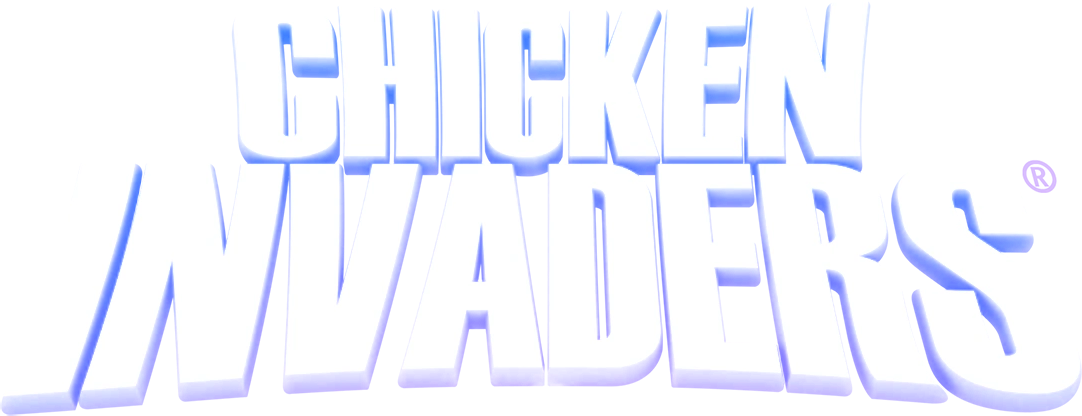
- Chicken Invaders series logo
- Genre: Shoot 'em up
- Developer: InterAction studios
- Publishers: InterAction studios; Betacom (mobile)
- Creator: Konstantinos Prouskas
- Platforms: Microsoft Windows; OS X; Linux; iOS; Android; Windows Phone; Xbox One; Xbox Series X/S
- First release: Chicken Invaders; July 24 1999; 27 years ago
- Latest release: Chicken Invaders Collection: Xbox Port; 6 November 2026; 13 days ago
- Spin-offs: Chicken Invaders Universe

Chicken Invaders is a series of shoot 'em up video games created by Greek indie developer Konstantinos Prouskas. With the release of the first game Chicken Invaders in 1999, the games are one of the longest running series of video games developed in Greece. All six main entries in the series have been developed by Prouskas' InterAction studios, and have been released for Microsoft Windows, OS X, Linux, iOS, Windows Phone, Android, and Xbox platforms.

The main theme of the games is a battle between a lone combat spacecraft and a technologically advanced race of space-faring chickens, who are intent on subjugating (and later destroying) Earth. The games make heavy use of humor, especially in the form of parodies of Galaxian, Star Wars, Space Invaders and Star Trek.

== Games ==
Release timeline
1999	Chicken Invaders
2000
2001
2002	Chicken Invaders: The Next Wave
2003	Chicken Invaders: The Next Wave - Christmas Edition
2004
2005
2006	Chicken Invaders: Revenge of the Yolk - Christmas Edition
2007	Chicken Invaders: Revenge of the Yolk
2008
2009
2010	Chicken Invaders: Revenge of the Yolk - Easter Edition
2010	Chicken Invaders: Ultimate Omelette
2011	Chicken Invaders: The Next Wave - Christmas Edition - Remastered
2011	Chicken Invaders: Ultimate Omelette - Christmas Edition
2012	Chicken Invaders: The Next Wave - Remastered
2012	Chicken Invaders: Ultimate Omelette - Easter Edition
2013	Chicken Invaders: Ultimate Omelette - Thanksgiving Edition
2014	Chicken Invaders: Cluck of the Dark Side
2015	Chicken Invaders: Cluck of the Dark Side - Halloween Edition
2016	Chicken Invaders: Cluck of the Dark Side - Christmas Edition
2017
2018	Chicken Invaders Universe (Early Access)
2019
2020
2021
2022	Chicken Invaders Universe
2023	Chicken Invaders - Remastered
2024
2025	Chicken Invaders Episode 1
2026	Chicken Invaders Collection: Xbox Port

=== Main series ===
==== Chicken Invaders ====
Chicken Invaders is the first game of the Chicken Invaders franchise, released on 24 July 1999. It is a fixed shooter, reminiscent of the original Space Invaders (of which the game is a parody), in which the player controls a lone spacecraft by moving it horizontally across the bottom of the screen and firing at swarms of invading extraterrestrial chickens. The game features both single player and two-player game modes. Known also as the DX Edition, it is a reimagined, 3D version of an earlier, unfinished DOS version made in 1997.

Chicken Invaders features weapon power-ups that resemble gift boxes, used by the player to upgrade their weapons. Enemy chickens drop eggs as projectile weapons, which the player needs to avoid. When chickens are defeated, they drop drumsticks, which the player can collect to earn a missile, a special weapon used to clear the screen of enemies. The game features an infinite amount of levels. Each level features 10 waves, and at the end of each level players fight a boss, which must be defeated in order to advance (or warp) to a new system. The gameplay is endless, bringing in wave after wave, until the player has finally lost all of their lives, in which case the game is over. The difficulty increases each time players advance to a new chapter; the enemies move or fall faster, and objects like asteroids will also move faster.

Chicken Invaders is the only game in the franchise to not feature "holiday editions", a trend which would become a staple of the franchise. It is also the only game in the series to be an exclusive Microsoft Windows title, and as such the only game to not have been ported to other platforms.

Chicken Invaders received a remastered version with the beta released on 20 January 2023 and the full release on 31 January 2023. Similar to the original, the remastered version is also an exclusive Microsoft Windows title. The version features a main menu, HD graphics, the anniversary song from Chicken Invaders Universe, a remastered cutscene, support for mouse and controllers and DirectX 11 support for better compatibility with newer versions of Windows, being Windows 8, 8.1, 10 and 11.

On 21 February 2025, the game was published on Steam under the name Chicken Invaders 1, and was officially released on 7 March 2025. This is a bundle which includes the original version of Chicken Invaders from 1999, Chicken Invaders Remastered from 2023, and a brand new version of the game titled Chicken Invaders Episode 1: The Saga Begins. This particular version was made using a new engine and has many changes backported from Chicken Invaders Universe, ranging from quality-of-life features to extra gimmick. It is also possible to import the purchase of this game into Chicken Invaders Universe as a DLC, allowing the user to play Episode 1 from within it.

==== Chicken Invaders: The Next Wave ====
Chicken Invaders: The Next Wave (known also as Chicken Invaders 2) is the second game in the main Chicken Invaders series, released on 22 December 2002. The player again takes command of the same lone spacecraft of the previous installment and must eliminate the chicken infestation of the Solar System. The game is considered a major improvement over its predecessor, featuring a variety of unique waves of chickens with different types of enemies and bosses, as well as allowing the player to move their ship in both the horizontal and vertical directions. It is also the first game in the franchise to introduce multiple weapons. The game departs from the "endless" format, instead featuring a final boss confrontation and an ending. As in the previous entry in the series, The Next Wave can be played by one or two players.

The Next Wave features eleven chapters, each one corresponding to a gravitationally rounded object of the Solar System. Players start the campaign moving inwards from Pluto, with the final chapter of the game taking place on the Sun, where players confront the Mother-Hen Ship. Each Chapter consists of 10 waves of attacking hostiles, resulting in a total of 110 different levels. In all the waves, chickens attack the player's ship by dropping eggs, which the player needs to avoid. Players can collect different items to help them in-game, such as new primary weapons which players earn by collecting parcels, and power-ups, which can be used to upgrade the current primary weapon. Weapons can be upgraded up to eleven levels. As in Chicken Invaders, players can collect chicken drumsticks and roasts to receive missiles, powerful weapons that can wipe out an entire wave of enemies. Incentives are given however for not using the missiles, as players may receive special bonuses (e.g. new weapons or extra firepower) if they opt to take on the wave head on.

The Next Wave was the first game in the franchise to feature a special version of the game (an edition) based around certain holidays. Chicken Invaders: The Next Wave - Christmas Edition was released on 25 November 2003, and was initially intended to be available during the months leading up to Christmas, however, its popularity caused InterAction studios to release this, and all subsequent Editions as standalone games. The Christmas Edition of The Next Wave replaces game graphics, sounds and music with festive versions and elements related to the Christmas holiday.

Both versions of the game received Remastered versions, which were released on 20 December 2011 (the Christmas Edition) and on 26 January 2012 (the regular edition). These versions feature HD graphics, orchestral high-quality music, automatic fire function, progress saving, new languages, etc.

The game and its Christmas Edition were initially released for Microsoft Windows, and have since been ported to MacOS, Linux, iOS, Android and Windows Phone.

==== Chicken Invaders: Revenge of the Yolk ====
Chicken Invaders: Revenge of the Yolk (known also as Chicken Invaders 3) is the third game in the Chicken Invaders main series, released on 11 November 2006 as a Christmas Edition, with the regular version releasing on 20 January 2007. The game is similar to The Next Wave in many respects, with the addition of new game mechanics and featuring 4-player cooperative play. It was intended as the final game in a planned Chicken Invaders trilogy, until the release of Ultimate Omelette in 2010.

Revenge of the Yolk features a plot and cutscenes, while waves and enemies are more diverse than in the previous entries. The game has 120 waves, in 10 levels across 12 systems in the galaxy. New game mechanics added include unlockable content in the form of additional features which first have to be unlocked by finishing the game, that can either make the game easier or harder, as well as a variety of cosmetic changes. Furthermore, Revenge of the Yolk was the first game to introduce an overheating mechanic, designed to discourage players from holding down the fire button. The game features 30 bonuses, while weapons can be powered up to 12 power levels (the last one being a secret).

Revenge of the Yolk is the only game in the franchise to be preceded by an Edition version, with its Christmas Edition being released almost 1,5 month earlier. The game was also the first to spawn an Easter Edition, released on 12 February 2010.

==== Chicken Invaders: Ultimate Omelette ====
Cover art for Chicken Invaders: Ultimate Omelette

Chicken Invaders: Ultimate Omelette (known also as Chicken Invaders 4) is the fourth main installment in the Chicken Invaders series, released on 29 November 2010 as a demo, with the full version releasing a week later. It is the first game in the series to be released on Valve's Steam platform, and the first to receive an accolade, as it was included in the Adrenaline Vault's Top Casual PC games of 2010.

Ultimate Omelette further added game mechanics to the Revenge of the Yolk formula, most notably the ability to rotate the player's ship to face in any direction, depending on the level (instead of constantly facing 'up', as in the previous installments). The game further features a more 'cinematic' camera zooming in or out depending on the action (e.g. boss fights typically have the camera zoomed out to contain all the action). The game features a more intricate plot than its predecessors, new weapons, dockable ship upgrades (Satellites) to deal additional damage to the various enemies and bosses, and in-game currency (Keys), dropped by specific enemies (indicated by a golden halo) during the course of the game, which allow the player to purchase unlockable content. Ultimate Omelette contains 120 waves across 12 Chapters. As is the case with Revenge of the Yolk, the player's ship primary weapons can be upgraded through 11 power levels, plus a secret 12th.

Ultimate Omelette had a Christmas Edition released on 24 November 2011, an Easter Edition released on 11 March 2012, and a Thanksgiving Edition (the only Edition in the series to be themed around the Thanksgiving holiday), which was released on 15 November 2013.

==== Chicken Invaders: Cluck of the Dark Side ====
Chicken Invaders: Cluck of the Dark Side (known also as Chicken Invaders 5) is the fifth game in the main series released for Microsoft Windows, OS X, Linux, iOS, Android, and Windows Phone. The beta release of the game was announced on 26 July 2014 and was completed in October, with the game receiving a final release on 21 November 2014.

The game shares many similarities with its predecessors, with notable additions including a Spaceship Customization mode, which allows players to change the Hero's M-404 PI's color and paintjob, and the Artifact Recovery Mission chapters, where players explore various different Planets. Furthermore, new weapons were added, along with a Mission Progress screen which shows player progress.

Thematic Editions of the game include the Halloween Edition released on 2 October 2015, and the Christmas Edition released on 19 September 2016. All of the Chicken Invaders main series games received a remaster which is still in beta and it includes all contents from Chicken Invaders Universe (though half of the contents can be unlocked by purchasing the full game), new features and redesigned graphics. all of the games are free and is available for download on the Chicken Invaders Forum. However, after the release of CIU version 149 which added DLCs to the game, the beta servers shut down though can still be downloaded meaning that they can only be played as DLCs in chicken invaders universe

All of the Chicken Invaders main series games received an Episodic Format update, which is essentially a rework that was made using a new engine. The new format includes all contents from Chicken Invaders Universe, with new features and redesigned graphics, though half of which need to be unlocked by purchasing the full game. As of 15 March 2025, only Chicken Invaders Episode 1: The Saga Begins has an official release on Steam, while the other episodes remain in beta testing, both on Steam and the Google Play Store. None of the episodes are available for download on the Apple App Store.

=== Spin-off games ===
==== Chicken Invaders Universe ====
Chicken Invaders Universe is a spin-off game in the Chicken Invaders franchise released on 14 December 2018 in early access. The game is an MMO, in which players, as recruits fresh out of the Heroes Academy, join the ranks of the United Hero Force to fight against the fowl Henpire.

On 14 July 2018, InterAction studios released the first teaser for the game, while on 14 August 2018, the official website for the game was created. As of 14 October 2022, the release date was set to be with the games' anniversary on 15 December 2022, which might come with Stable and Beta branch.

On 20 November 2024, InterAction studios released an update for the game that introduced episodic DLC where the main games can be purchased as DLC contents to be played from within the game. However, the DLCs were not available for purchase yet and only supported exporting purchases of the games on Steam through a beta version of the new Episodes, or from the official website of InterAction studios.

On 6 February 2025, Chicken Invaders Universe was delisted from the Google Play Store and Apple App Store in Vietnam following their legislation regarding online games.

On 11 February 2025, with the release of Version 152, the option to purchase DLCs in Chicken Invaders Universe was made accessible to all players. Episodes 2, 3, 4 and 5 are available for purchase.

While Episode 1 remained unavailable for the time being until the release of Version 153 on 6 March 2025 to finally make Episode 1 purchasable in the game.

Chicken Invaders Collection

On 11 June 2026, a new collection for the franchise was announced publicly. The collection is meant to get released by the end of 2026 on Xbox. And later on the other consoles.

A day later the first build was released publicly, the beta was released on Steam and the way of accessing it was requesting a playtest in Chicken Invaders Universe Steam Page.

On 21 October 2026, the collection was announced to be released on 6 November 2026 and at the same time, the developer sent promotional codes for participant players to get the game early, however it's exclusive to console players only.

On 6 November 2026, the collection was released to the public on Xbox for both console and PC players.

== Reception ==
The Chicken Invaders series has been positively received. CNET gave the first Chicken Invaders 4 out of 5 stars, highlighting the graphics and sound but criticizing the game's lack of features, and repetitive gameplay. CNET also gave The Next Wave 4 out of 5 stars, again praising the graphics, but criticizing the lack of a windowed mode. The Next Wave was rated "mediocre" by GameSpot, criticizing the repetitive gameplay and indistinct enemy bullets. However, the colorful, cartoony graphics where highlighted, as were "flashes of understanding of what makes a good shooter".

Shortly after Ultimate Omelette's release, it was included in Adrenaline Vault's "Top Casual PC Games of 2010" list. The reviewer described it as "the most fun arcade space shooter in a very, very long time". The original orchestral soundtrack was also praised as rousing, invigorating, and "simply the absolute best".

Gamezebo gave Ultimate Omellete, a 4 out of 5 stars rating, stating that "Chicken Invaders 4 is fantastic for a first-timer to the series", but criticizing that "for veterans of the games, it will feel a little too samey. The action has improved somewhat over the course of the series, but it's still really the same ideas and premise that ran through the other games. Hence, those who are not new to the games may feel that paying full price for this latest release is a little too much."

Reception of the fifth game in the series, Cluck of the Dark Side has likewise been favorable. The game currently has "Overwhelmingly Positive" reviews on the Steam store, and was voted as "Greek Game of the Year" by Greek media and entertainment website GameWorld.gr users in its annual Game of the Year Awards 2015.
