= Kaffeine =

Free and open source media player

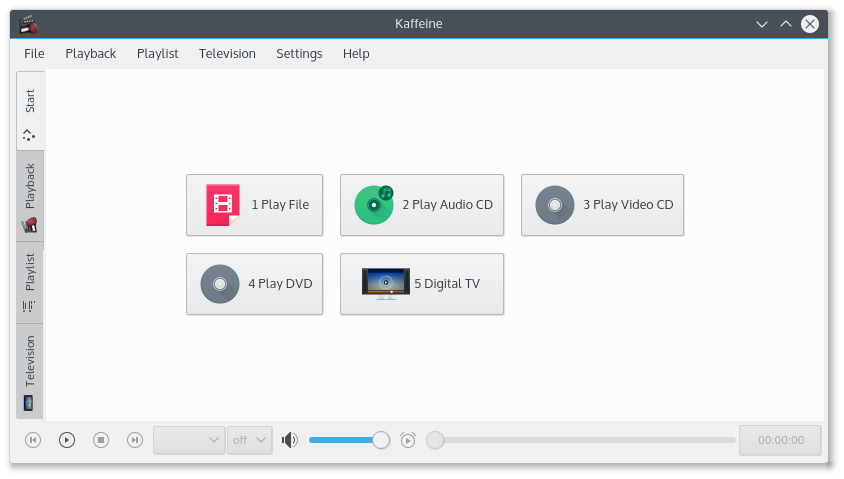
- Kaffeine title screen on Kubuntu
- Developer: KDE
- Preview release: — [±]
- Written in: C++ (Qt)
- Operating system: Unix-like
- Available in: Multilingual
- Type: Media player
- License: GPL-2.0-or-later
- Website: apps.kde.org/kaffeine/
- Repository: invent.kde.org/multimedia/kaffeine

Kaffeine is a media player for Unix-like operating systems by KDE.

By default it uses libVLC media framework but also supports GStreamer. It also supports the use of MPlayer project's binary codecs for proprietary formats.

Kaffeine developers have also produced a Mozilla plugin to start the player for streaming content over the web.

Features include streaming, DVD, Video CD and CD audio,and ever since version >0.5 also provides full DVB support,^{[4]} And, can simultaneously play and record multiple different channels within the same transponder.

Nicely handles multiple frontends on a single device.

DiSEqC 1.x switches, DiSEqC 1.2 rotors and USALS.

The most recent official stable version is 2.0.19, released in November 2024.

== Supported Features ==
- Digital TV and, Radio via digital TV
- Time shifting
- Recording, including unattended recording
- EPG, also EPG-driven timers,OSD And, EPG
- AC3
- DVB Subtitles
- HDTV^{[5]}

== Supported Multi Standards ==
- Cable Standards: DVB-C
- Terrestrial Standards: ATSC, ISDB-T, DVB-T, DVB-T2
- Satellital Standards: DVB-S, DVB-S2
