= Anomaly: Warzone Earth =

2011 video game

- Developer: 11 bit studios
- Publisher: Headup Games (Germany)
- Designer: Michał Drozdowski
- Programmer: Bartłomiej Walecki
- Artist: Przemek Marszał
- Composer: Piotr Musial
- Platforms: Windows, Mac OS X, Linux, iOS, Android, Xbox 360, PlayStation Network, Blackberry 10
- Release: Windows, OS X: WW: April 8, 2011; iOS: WW: August 11, 2011; Android: WW: November 29, 2011 (Amazon Appstore); WW: January 25, 2012; Xbox Live Arcade: WW: April 6, 2012; PlayStation Network: NA: September 11, 2012; EU: August 29, 2012; Blackberry 10: WW: February 20, 2013
- Genres: Real-time strategy, tower defense

Anomaly: Warzone Earth is a real-time strategy tower defense video game by 11-bit studios. The game was announced in late 2010 and released on April 8, 2011, for Windows and Mac OS X.

== Plot ==
The game is set in the near future, where sections of an alien spacecraft have crash-landed in several major cities around the world, including Baghdad and Tokyo.

The player assumes the role of the commander of an armor battalion (referred to as "14th Platoon" in the story) sent to investigate anomalies that have occurred in the vicinity of the wreckage and gather information on what is happening in the affected areas, as the anomalies are interfering with radar and satellite imagery - and to neutralize any threats that may exist within the anomalies' field of influence.

== Gameplay ==
Convoy has blue health bars while the tower is red

The style of the gameplay has been described as "reverse tower defense," "tower attack," and "tower offense." Players control a convoy of vehicles investigating anomalies around sections of a downed alien spacecraft, which are protected by various types of defensive towers that must be destroyed. Players do not directly control the vehicles in the convoy; instead, they set paths for the convoy to follow along city streets, while also dropping power-ups such as decoys or smoke-screens to aid the survival of the convoy. In addition, players can purchase and equip several different units with varying offensive and defensive attributes to make up the convoy.

In the Windows, Mac, Linux and XBLA versions, players directly control a soldier on foot (dubbed the Commander) who they use to pick up and drop the power-ups for the convoy. The iOS and Android versions omit the Commander in lieu of the player directly placing power using the touch-based interface. In addition, the iOS and Android versions do not feature the levels set in Tokyo.

== Release ==
Anomaly: Warzone Earth was released on PC and Mac on April 8, 2011, and on iOS on August 11, 2011, as separate apps for iPhone and iPad. An Android version followed, initially as an exclusive release on the Amazon Appstore on November 29, 2011, then as a general Android Market release on January 25, 2012. The game was released on Xbox Live Arcade in April 2012. A beta Linux version was created but quickly scrapped as it was too buggy.

== Reception ==
Reception

Aggregate score
| Aggregator | Score |
|---|---|
| Metacritic | PC: 80/100 iOS: 94/100 iOS (HD): 90/100; X360: 79/100; PS3: 78/100 |

Review score
| Publication | Score |
|---|---|
| TouchArcade | 5/5 |

Anomaly: Warzone Earth received strong reviews from critics. GamesBeat gave the game a score of 80/100, saying, "While it's hard to control, Anomaly is still playable and enjoyable as long as you take the time to master the interface first." Select Start Media awarded the game 7.9/10, praising the unique idea of "tower offence" and solid gameplay. As of November 14, 2011, the iOS version is one of the highest-rated iOS games of all time on Metacritic with a score of 94.

In June 2011, OS X version was awarded the Apple Design Award during the Apple Worldwide Developers Conference. At the end of 2011, Apple posted their annual iTunes and App Store rewind lists, where Anomaly: Warzone Earth was named Game of the Year Runner-Up.

iOS version was chosen Game of the Year Runner-Up by TouchArcade, and was named the "Best Strategy" iOS game of the year in TouchGen's Editor's Choice Awards. GameSpot also nominated the PC version for the Best Strategy Game of 2011.

== Sequel ==
In August 2012, 11-bit studios announced that a sequel titled Anomaly: Korea will be released. The game, set several months after the events of Anomaly: Warzone Earth, featured new units and new powers. On February 28, 2013, 11-bit studios announced on their social networks that Anomaly 2 would be coming out soon. The game was debuted at Boston's PAX East on March 22, 2013.
