= Zero-K =

2010 video game

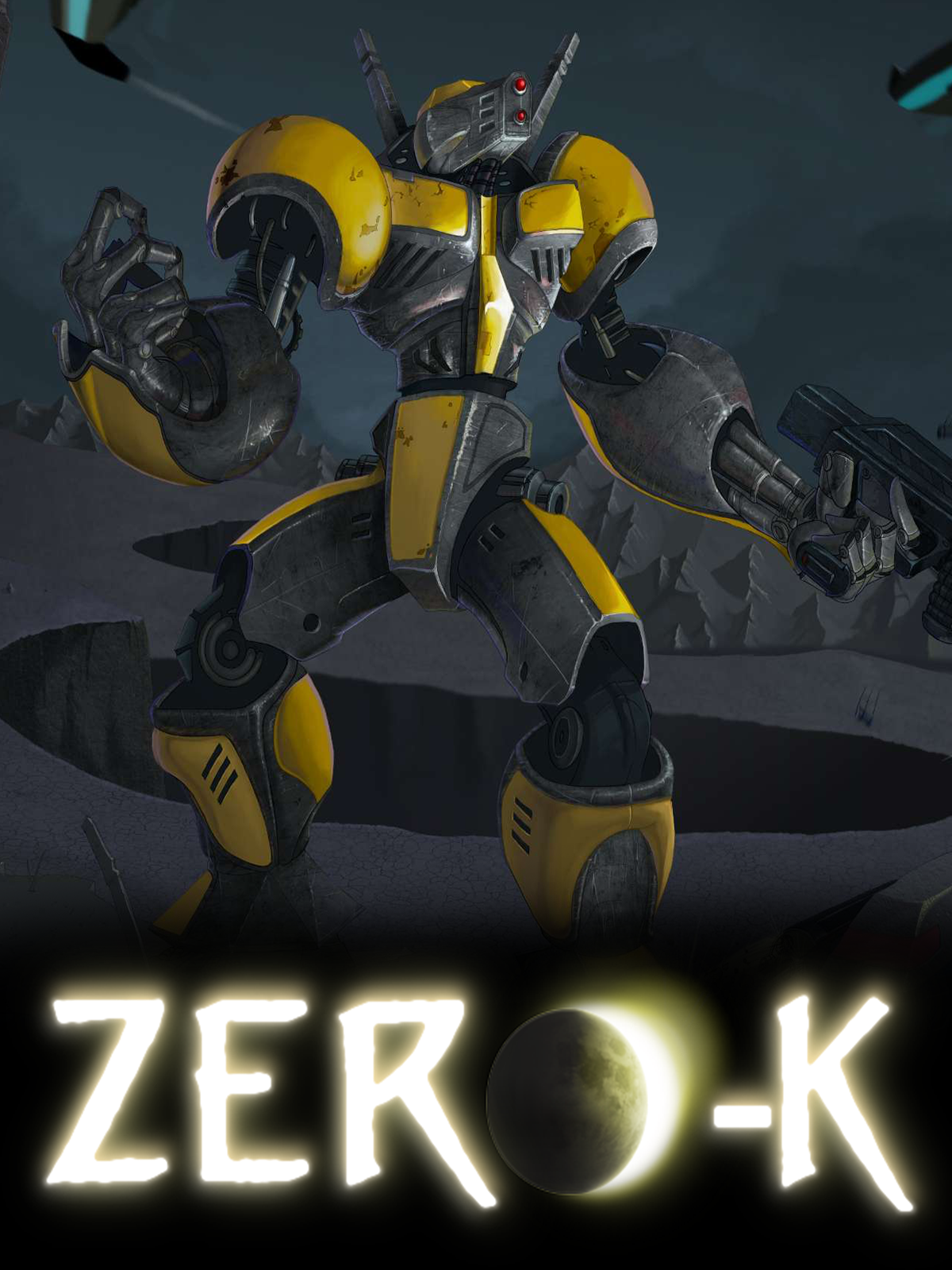
- Cover art for the video game Zero-K
- Developer: See Credits Supporters
- Platforms: Microsoft Windows, Linux, Mac
- Release: v1.0 - October 1, 2010; 15 years ago v1.12.9.0 - September 21, 2024; 20 months ago
- Genre: Real-time strategy
- Mode: Co-op mode; multiplayer; single-player

Zero-K is a free multi-platform open source real-time strategy video game. Initially based on content from Total Annihilation on the open source Spring Engine, it was forked and all proprietary content replaced, and evolved into a completely new game with unique features. Among the games powered by the Spring Engine, Zero-K makes extensive use of Lua scripting for interface and gameplay changes/enhancements, as well as unique real-time strategy concepts such as a flat technology tree.

== Gameplay ==
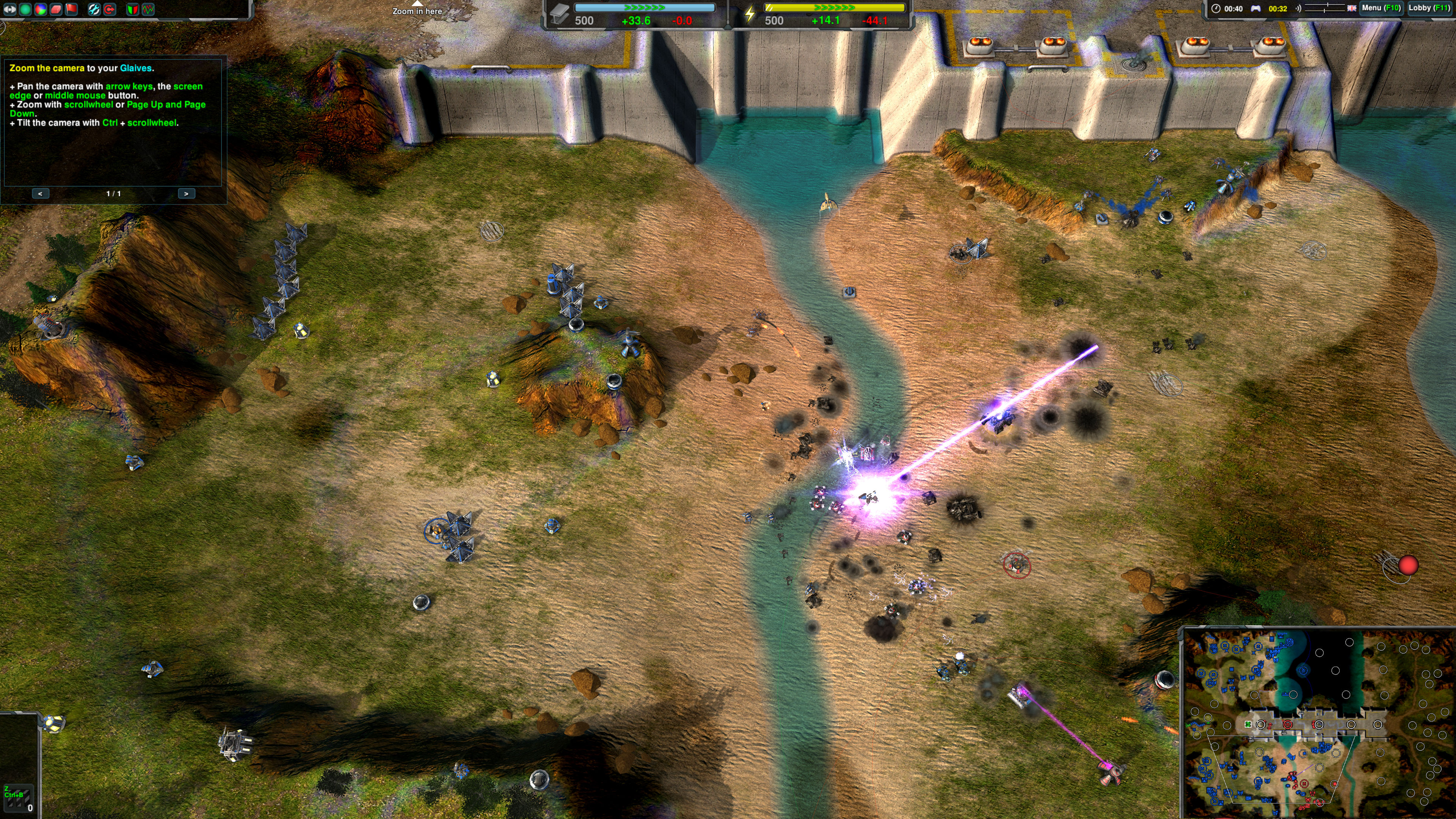
Zero-K gameplay

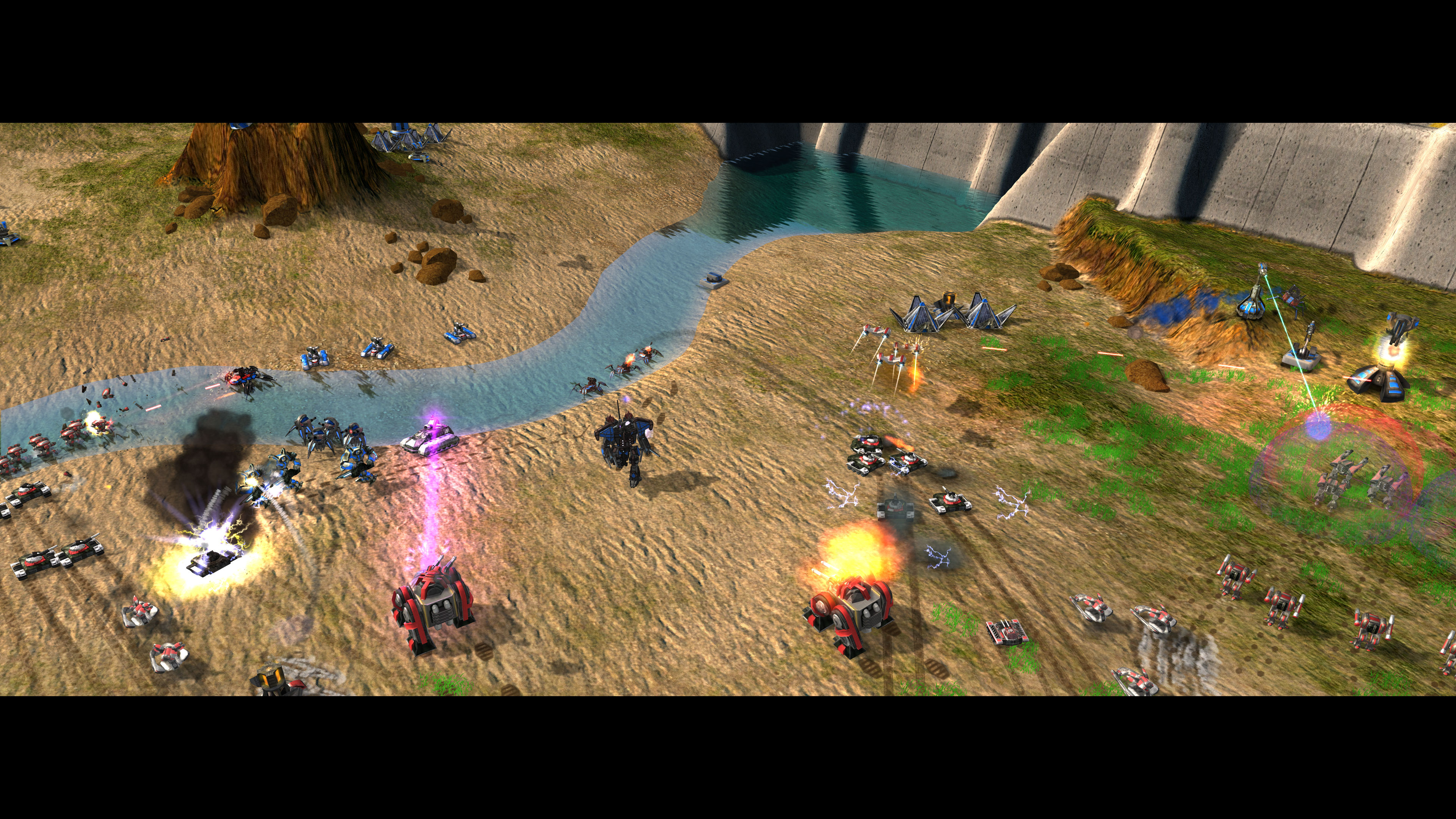
Zero-K in-game cinematic

Zero-K has similar gameplay to Total Annihilation. Players start out with a construction-capable bipedal mech known as the Commander which acts as the player's avatar. Players use their commander to construct a base of operations from which they can expand to fight and ultimately destroy opposing players. Players can upgrade their commander with new weapons and modules as the game progresses.

The economy in Zero-K, consists of two resources, Metal and Energy which are used to create and repair buildings and units.

There exists a single player campaign where players start with only their commander and a few basic units. Each mission unlocks a few more units to slowly introduce the player to the game. The missions do not have to be played in a fixed order so that the player can choose which units to unlock first. Depending on the player's performance, each mission yields a different number of experience points. The player can use these experience points to improve their commander.

The interface allows players to build up large armies and bases with ease so the player is free to concentrate on actual tactics and strategy. Executing sophisticated strategies is made as simple as possible, including queuing up any number of units, ordering a constructor to build many different buildings, or ordering a factory to build planes that would automatically patrol a route as they roll off the assembly line. Zero-K is almost unique in having this level of control.

=== Online play ===
Zero-K can be played online in 1v1, team, or free for all (FFA) style battles, as well as playing cooperatively against Chickens, bots or in the campaign. Planet Wars is an massively multiplayer online style strategy game tied to Zero-K where individual battles are fought against other players to gain "influence" on planets. Each player can either create or join a clan, and all the influence they earn will count toward the clan's. Planet Wars resets each time one clan achieves one or more of the three victory conditions - Conquest, Economy, Technology. However, ever since season 8, a new faction system has been implemented: Each clan and player is randomly assigned to a faction, and all the influence that person or clan makes will count toward the faction's.

=== Chickens ===
Zero-K includes a unique game mode called Chickens. Chicken games are essentially similar to tower defense games, except the player is free to build any units. The chickens will adapt to the player's strategies, deploying siege weaponry and special units if the player plays too defensively and deploying heavier defenses against offensive players. Chickens comes in various levels of difficulty, as well as the ability to set custom difficulty options. In a game of Chickens, the goal is to survive an onslaught of various semi-sentient alien creatures until their "Queen" attacks. The objective of a game of chickens is to survive, with a side objective being to destroy "Roosts" placed around the map - keeping the attacking chickens from becoming more powerful. The game ends with either annihilation of the players, or the death of the Chicken Queen.

== Development and release ==
Zero-K is released under "the GNU General Public License or Public Domain unless otherwise specified". The artwork is under various licenses, for instance the sound under a CC BY-NC-ND Creative Commons license.

Zero-K was released on Steam on 27 April 2018.

== Reception ==
PC Gamer named it 2017 "One of PC Gamers best free games of 2017".

== See also ==
- List of open source games
- Beyond All Reason
