= Caffeine (coffeehouse chain) =

Lithuanian coffeehouse chain

- Company type: Subsidiary
- Industry: Coffee shop
- Founded: 27 March 2007
- Headquarters: Vilnius, Lithuania
- Number of locations: 140+ (2025)
- Area served: Lithuania; Latvia; Estonia; Norway; Denmark
- Products: Coffee, tea and other beverages, pastries, light meals, packaged coffee beans
- Owner: Reitan AS
- Website: caffeine.lt

Caffeine (stylised CAFFEINE; formerly Coffee Inn and Caffeine Roasters) is a coffeehouse chain headquartered in Vilnius, Lithuania. Founded in 2007, it is the largest branded coffee chain in the Baltic states, operating more than 100 cafés in Lithuania and additional stores in Latvia, Estonia, Norway and Denmark.

== History ==
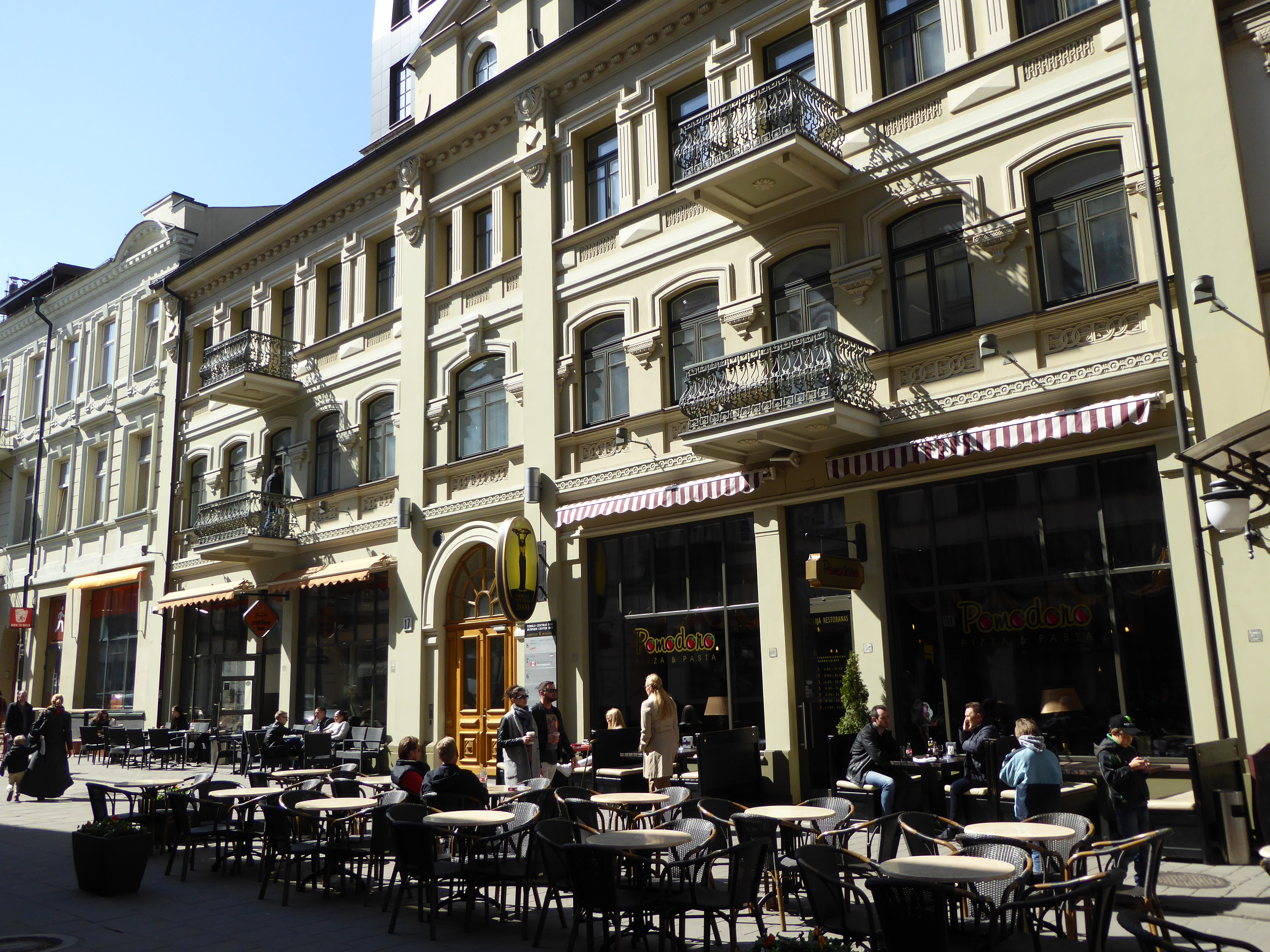
The inaugural Coffee Inn location at 17 Vilniaus Street (on the left, in 2015)

The chain began in 2007, when four Lithuanian entrepreneurs opened the first Coffee Inn café in Vilnius Old Town.

In 2012, 45.26 percent of the business was acquired by BaltCap venture capital. In 2014, it acquired additional shares upping the stake to controlling 59.07 percent.

Its bright orange branding and focus on takeaway espresso helped drive rapid growth, and by the mid-2010s Coffee Inn had become the largest coffee chain in the Baltics with around 60 cafés.

In 2017 the chain adopted the name Caffeine Roasters following a trademark dispute with an Estonian chain using a similar name.

In October 2018, Reitan Convenience, a division of Reitan AS, acquired the chain, with the founding team remaining in management. Soon after, the brand was shortened to Caffeine and integrated into the group's wider convenience formats. The concept expanded beyond the Baltics, with cafés opening in Oslo and Copenhagen. In 2022 the chain switched all Baltic outlets to serving only certified organic beans, becoming the first in the region to do so.

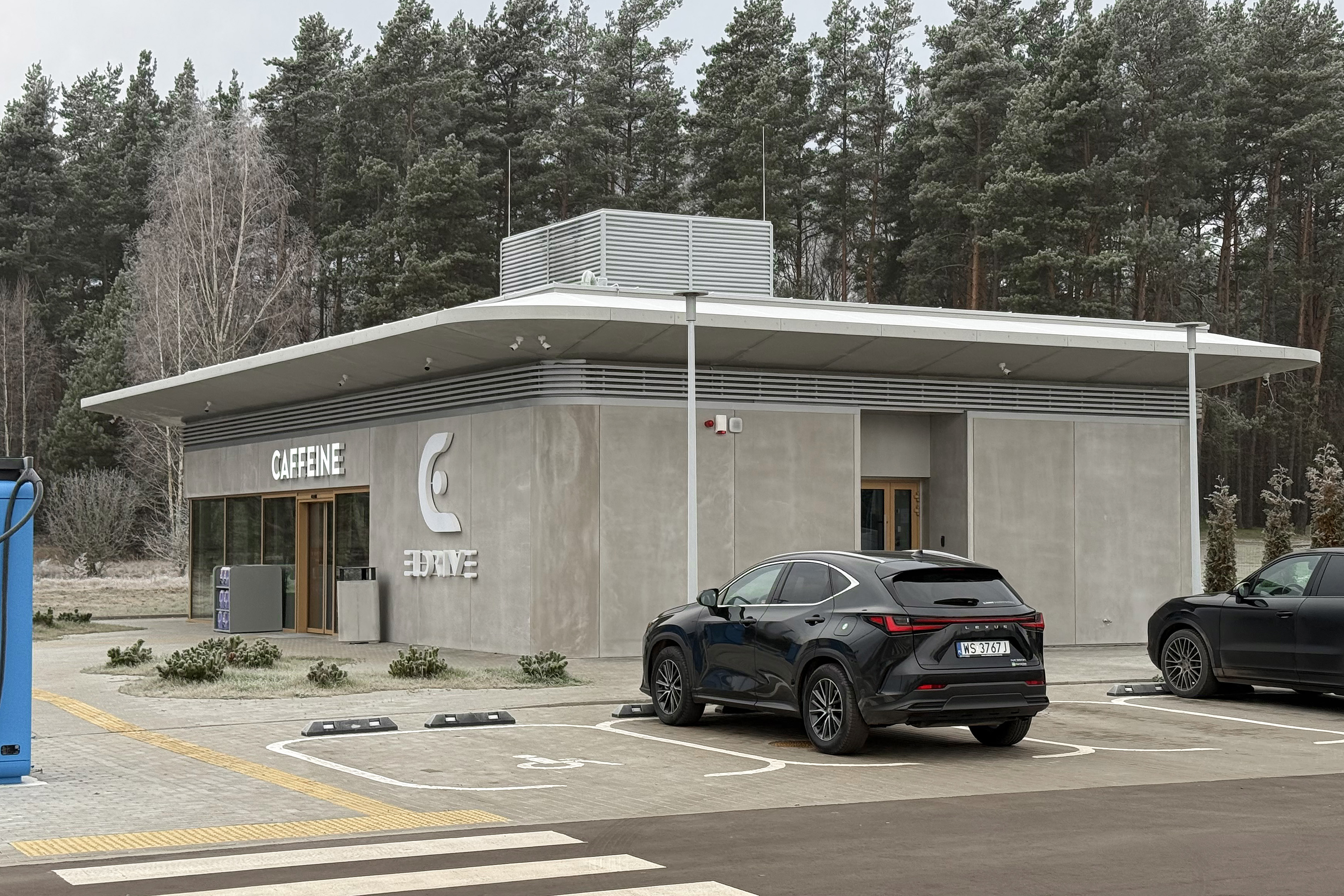
A Caffeine café in Senoji Varėna, Lithuania

By 2025 Caffeine operated more than 100 cafés in Lithuania, including a new drive-through and charging hub in Varėna. The chain also ran 27 cafés in Latvia and 12 in Estonia.

== Operations ==
Most cafés are company-owned and located in urban centres, shopping malls, business districts, and transport hubs, with some sites franchised. The chain serves espresso-based drinks, filter coffee, cold brew, tea, hot chocolate and seasonal beverages, alongside pastries and light food. Packaged coffee beans, including organic blends, are sold in cafés and online. A loyalty app provides discounts and pre-ordering options.

Caffeine is noted in local media for helping spread takeaway coffee and laptop-friendly café culture in cities such as Vilnius, Kaunas and Klaipėda. The company promotes sustainability through its organic-coffee policy, reusable-cup incentives and co-location of some sites with electric-vehicle charging hubs operated by Eldrive Lithuania.
