= Circa Infinity =

2015 puzzle-platform game

- Developer: Kenny Sun
- Publishers: Kenny Sun; RedDeerGames (consoles)
- Engine: GameMaker Studio
- Platforms: Windows; OS X; Linux; Nintendo Switch; Xbox One; Xbox Series X/S
- Release: Windows, OS X, Linux: WW: September 9, 2015; Nintendo Switch, Xbox One, Xbox Series X/S: WW: November 5, 2021
- Genre: Puzzle-platform
- Mode: Single-player

Circa Infinity is a puzzle-platform game developed and published by Kenny Sun. It was released on September 9, 2015 for Microsoft Windows, OS X, and Linux. Console versions for Nintendo Switch, Xbox One, and Xbox Series X and Series S were released by RedDeerGames on November 5, 2021. The game is set on recursive, concentric circles that alternate in color, on which a variety of enemies pose the player with numerous challenges.

== Gameplay ==
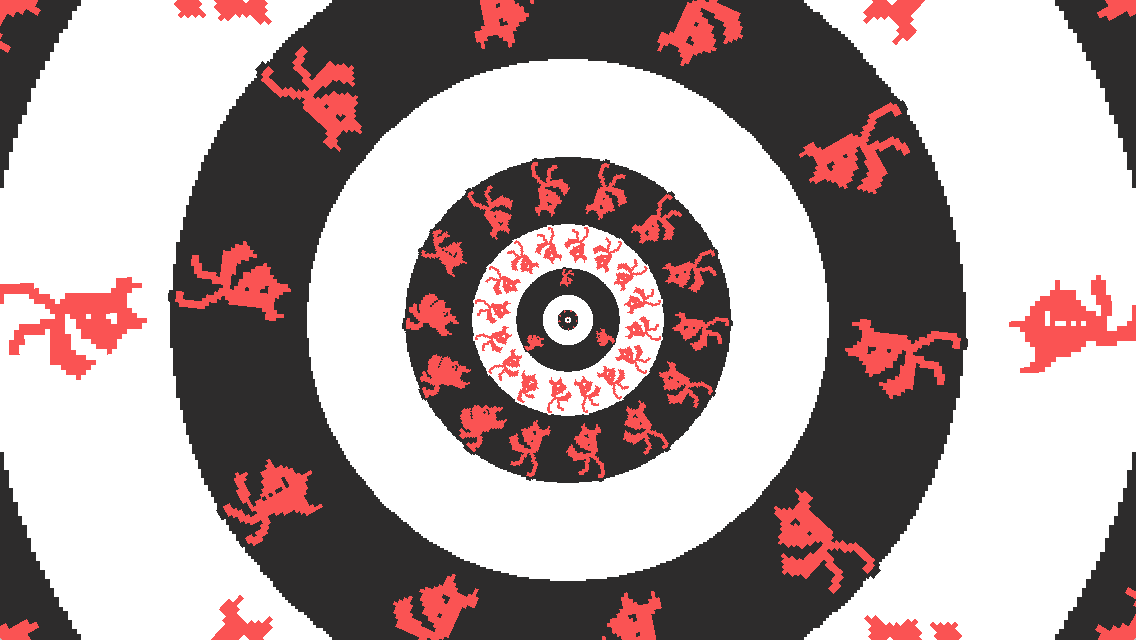
Gameplay screenshot

Circa Infinity contains 50 levels, which are divided into 5 parts. Each part adds a layer of complexity to the gameplay. The player controls their character (or characters) by running around the edge of a circle. The core flow of the game involves flipping inside the circle at specified areas, avoiding demons, and jumping to the next circle. Since the enemies from the previous few circles stay on screen, the level design additionally serves to create a hypnotizing visual effect.

== Soundtrack ==
The Circa Infinity Official Soundtrack was written and produced by brothers Jack Fay and Jim Fay under the name JACK+JIM.

== Reception ==
Reception

Aggregate scores
Aggregator	Score
GameRankings	(PC) 78.00%
Metacritic	(PC) 80/100

Review score
Publication	Score
Destructoid	9/10

Circa Infinity received generally positive reviews from critics. Aggregating review websites GameRankings and Metacritic gave the game 78.00% based on 5 reviews and 80/100 based on 6 reviews.

Destructoid's Ben Pack scored the game 9 out of 10, saying "Brilliant level design and a great aesthetic keep the game fresh from start to finish". Pack praised the game's progression, saying that the levels "all do a great job of slowly introducing new mechanics and folding them back into existing challenges".

Nathan Grayson of Kotaku called Circa Infinity "a game where each moment is unified yet singular", saying "the whole game has an almost musical cadence to it, a churning swirl of interlocking audio and visuals that lulls you into a purely reflexive state before jolting you awake with a section that requires serious forethought"
