= Back to Bed =

2011 video game

- Nintendo Switch cover art
- Developer: Bedtime Digital Games
- Publishers: Bedtime Digital Games; Loot Interactive (PS3/4/Vita); 2Awesome Studio (Switch)
- Director: William Jakob Reynish
- Designer: Jonas Byrresen
- Programmer: Henrik Ossipoff Hansen
- Artists: Jakob Witt, Henrik Christensen
- Engine: Unity
- Platforms: Android; Browser iOS; Linux macOS; Windows; Nintendo Switch; PlayStation 3 PlayStation 4 Vita; Wii U tvOS
- Release: Browser: WW: 2011; Linux, Mac, Windows: WW: August 6, 2014; Android, iOS: WW: August 28, 2014; PS3, PS4, Vita: WW: August 25, 2015; Wii U: EU: December 22, 2016; NA: February 16, 2017; Switch: WW: April 11, 2019
- Genre: Puzzle
- Mode: Single-player

Back to Bed is a puzzle video game developed and published by independent developer Bedtime Digital Studios. It was released as a browser game in 2011, then for Windows, OS X, and Linux on August 6, 2014; for the PlayStation 3, PlayStation 4, and PlayStation Vita on August 25, 2015; Android and iOS on August 28, 2014; Wii U on December 22, 2016; and Nintendo Switch on April 11, 2019.

== Gameplay ==
A still from the game where Subob (the player) is trying to guide Bob back to bed

In Back to Bed, the player is tasked with guiding a sleepwalker named Bob through a series of isometric levels representing surreal, dreamlike environments to ensure his safety. Players control Bob's apparent guardian angel, Subob, who must manipulate the environment to steer Bob safely back to bed. Subob's primary objective is to prevent Bob from falling off the edge of the level or colliding with hazards that would wake him up. To achieve this, players utilize various objects and structures within the environment, such as blocks, ramps, and platforms, to create a path for Bob to follow.

The game requires players to determine the most efficient route for Bob to traverse. Players must consider factors such as Bob's movement speed, the placement of obstacles, and the properties of interactive objects when devising their solutions. Throughout the game, players encounter increasingly difficult puzzles. As players progress, new gameplay elements and mechanics are introduced. These include rotating platforms, teleportation portals, and environmental hazards.

Back to Bed's art style was inspired by the surrealist works of artists like Salvador Dalí and M. C. Escher. The game's visuals are characterized by colors, designs, and landscapes that reflect the dreamlike nature of Bob's subconscious. The game allows players to progress through the game at their own pace without time limits or competitive elements. The focus is solely on puzzle-solving and exploration, encouraging players to use their creativity to find the optimal solution.

== Reception ==
Reception

Aggregate scores
Aggregator	Score				
Aggregator	iOS	PC	PS Vita	PS4	Wii U
Metacritic	63/100	57/100	60/100	62/100	56/100
OpenCritic	12% of critics recommend	12% of critics recommend	12% of critics recommend	12% of critics recommend	12% of critics recommend

Review scores
Publication	Score				
Publication	iOS	PC	PS Vita	PS4	Wii U
Eurogamer	N/A	6/10 (Note: This review was done by a reviewer for Eurogamer.it.)	N/A	N/A	N/A
GameRevolution	N/A	5/10	N/A	N/A	N/A
Gamezebo	80/100	N/A	N/A	N/A	N/A
Hardcore Gamer	N/A	3/5	2.5/5	2.5/5	N/A
IGN	6.5/10 (Note: This review was done by a reviewer for IGN Spain.)	5/10 (Note: This review was done by a reviewer for IGN Italia.)	N/A	N/A	N/A
Nintendo Life	N/A	N/A	N/A	N/A	3.5/5 stars
Nintendo World Report	N/A	N/A	N/A	N/A	6/10
Pocket Gamer	3/5 stars	N/A	N/A	N/A	N/A
Push Square	N/A	N/A	N/A	3/5 stars	N/A
TouchArcade	3.5/5 stars	N/A	N/A	N/A	N/A
148Apps	3.5/5 stars	N/A	N/A	N/A	N/A
CD-Action	N/A	6/10	N/A	N/A	N/A
Digitally Downloaded	N/A	3.5/5 stars	N/A	N/A	N/A
Game Rant	N/A	N/A	N/A	2/5 stars	N/A
Softpedia	N/A	3/5 stars	N/A	N/A	N/A

Back to Bed received "mixed or average" reviews according to review aggregator platform Metacritic. 12% of critics recommended the game on OpenCritic.

Eurogamer.it rated the game 6/10, stating that "What is missing most of all, however, is any element of interconnection that pushes us to proceed. The levels, taken individually, are interesting and fun but it is not clear what should push us to proceed. A flaw that is barely noticeable on mobile but which risks becoming tiring in a short time on desktop."

Paul Tamburro for GameRevolution rated the game 5/10, stating that "As it stands, Back to Bed occupies an odd middle-ground, in that it manages to be both endearingly quirky yet fundamentally dull."

Jillian Werner for Gamezebo rated the game 80/100, stating that "Almost everything about Back to Bed seems designed with the player in mind, from the quirky narration to its speed-up button to the minimal punishment for failure. The re-purposed Surrealist objects create a unique dreamscape that is a treat to wander, and Nightmare mode provides a surprising amount of replay value."

Alex Carlson for Hardcore Gamer rated the PC version of the game 3/5, stating that "Puzzle design is respectable and can be challenging, but more of the identifiable art design could've been integrated into the puzzles themselves. If you can overcome the control quirks, Back to Bed can be a fun little puzzle game, but one that uses its aesthetic uncreatively." Whereas Jason Bohn, also for Hardcore Gamer rated the PlayStation 4 and PlayStation Vita versions of the game 2.5/5, stating that "While Back To Bed is not a terrible puzzler by any stretch of the imagination, it is terribly underwhelming. There is simply so much more that could have been done to really make this a gem. The stylish look of the game is superlative, but that is really all there is to it."

Inés Barriocanal for IGN Spain rated the iOS version of the game 6.5/10, stating that "The problem is that the lack of resources leads to neglecting the duration due to the great effort required to bring a game to light. This is the case of Back to Bed, which despite its somewhat repetitive mechanics offers simple fun... until it's over. And that moment, unfortunately, does not take long to arrive." Whereas Lorenzo Baldo for IGN Italia rated the PC version of the game 5/10, stating that "Like a modern Icarus, or rather like the typical customer of a buffet, Bedtime Digital Games certainly has no shortage of inspiration, desire to do and aspirations for success. No, the problem is the never-too-esteemed sense of proportion, vital in separating victory... from nightmare."

Liam Doolin for Nintendo Life rated the Wii U version of the game 7 out of 10 stars, stating that "As simple as Back to Bed may seem, it's a satisfying puzzle game. Bob's dream sequences further enhance the experience with the inclusion of an appropriately fitting surreal art style. If you're in the mood for a fun and functional puzzle game, maybe consider this one."

Casey Gibson for Nintendo World Report rated the Wii U version of the game 6/10, stating that "Back to Bed offers a great look into the fascinating world of Bob's dreams, but sadly you'll only be there for about two hours. The Wii U version doesn't include any added content or features, but does support off screen play. While the game stands tall from a presentation aspect, where it lacks most is in the act of playing it."

Harry Slater for Pocket Gamer rated the game 3 out of 5 stars, stating that "There's a nice idea here, but the cumbersome controls mean Back to Bed gets tiring pretty quick." Joey Thurmond for Push Square rated the game 6 out of 10 stars, stating that "Back to Bed is something that we'd love to see again in the future. A sequel could build upon and flesh out its genius puzzle solving foundation, but as it stands, the game feels more like a well-developed prototype than a fully-fledged title."

Andrew Fretz for TouchArcade rated the game 3 and a half out of 5 stars, stating that "Back to Bed has a relatively small target audience with decisions that were made to emphasize visuals over gameplay, but for that audience there is a lot of appeal. At $3.99 I would have expected a little more innovation instead of rote gameplay. I would have liked to see the inspiration go beyond a handful of pieces of art and into a wider selection including more artists."

CD-Action rated the game 6/10 in their magazine, stating that "I wish the developers spiced up basic 30 challenges instead of putting their efforts into the additional game mode." Jennifer Allen for 148Apps also rated the game 3 and a half out of 5 stars, stating that "It's a lovely concept and its art style alone will draw some folks in, but Back to Bed isn't quite as special as it would like to be." Trent P. for Digitally Downloaded rated the game 3 and a half out of 5 stars, stating that "While this means in total the game offers 60 puzzles I felt while playing it that I could play it for much longer – there was a lot of room for the developers to come up with more puzzles." Game Rant rated the game 2 out of 5 stars, stating that "Really, Back to Bed is the worst kind of game: one that flirts with some good ideas, but never commits to doing anything with them. The core apple-dropping mechanic gets old fast, and while the graphics look great, they'd be better served in a different, more interesting game. It's not often that you see a game that takes something cool and completely misses the point - but if you're looking for one, Back to Bed is the game for you." Radu Haulica for Softpedia rated the game 3 out of 5 stars, stating that "Back to Bed is yet another indie video game that comes off as refreshing and brilliant at first, only to succumb a short while later at the hands of poor execution and limited overall vision."

=== Awards and accolades ===
List of awards and nominations
Year	Award	Category	Recipient	Result	Ref.
2012	Nordic Game Indie Night	Best Indie Game	Back to Bed	Nominated	
2012	Unity Awards	Best Student Project	Back to Bed	Nominated	
2012	Dutch Game Awards	Guts & Glory	Back to Bed	Won	
2013	IGF Awards	Student Showcase	Back to Bed	Nominated	
