= Caffeine (video game) =

2015 survival horror video game

- Developer: Incandescent Imaging
- Publisher: Incandescent Imaging
- Designer: Dylan Browne
- Engine: Unreal Engine 4
- Platforms: Microsoft Windows, OS X, Linux
- Release: WW: 5 October 2015
- Genres: Adventure game, action
- Mode: Single-player

Caffeine is an episodic first-person adventure puzzle video game created by Dylan Browne and developed by Incandescent Imaging. The creator posted the game on Indiegogo to help crowdfund the development. The game takes place on a derelict spaceship used to mine caffeine, and it is inspired by Condemned: Criminal Origins, F.E.A.R., and Doom 3. Five episodes of Caffeine were intended for release on Microsoft Windows, OS X, and Linux on 5 October 2015, though it has yet to release any episodes after the first.

== Story and gameplay ==
Caffeine is set in a universe where Earth has depleted its caffeine resources, prompting major corporations to invest in space mining expeditions for the substance. Players assume the role of a young boy with a severe caffeine addiction aboard one of these mining ships. Waking up with no recollection of his presence on the vessel, the protagonist begins exploring, running into multiple characters throughout his journey on the mostly abandoned ship.

Caffeine forgoes combat mechanics, focusing instead on the environments and scenery that the player must explore. The gameplay primarily involves navigating through empty corridors and solving puzzles to progress. These puzzles are predominantly environmental and memory-based, requiring players to explore and remember information to overcome obstacles. Caffeine includes lore scattered throughout the game, presented as sticky notes, audio logs, whiteboards, and more.

== Development and marketing ==
Caffeine was developed by Incandescent Imaging, an indie video game developer company. As of 2019, their only two releases are the first episode of Caffeine and a mobile game called Boxed In. The game was developed mostly by the head of the company, Dylan Browne. He is the creative mind behind most of the game. The composer, Adam Klingman, and sound designer, Jonathan Wachoru, were responsible for the game's sound and music. Over the years preceding its release, Caffeine made appearances on video game news sites, such as IGN and Kotaku. This culminated in excitement surrounding the release of the game, but it died out with a lackluster launch of the first episode, and no follow-up for further episodes.

== Release and reception ==
Caffeine was released on 5 October 2015, on Steam for PC players, as well as being playable on many virtual reality systems. The game was never released on any other systems. It can be bought on a per-episode basis, or players could purchase the season pass and receive all the episodes when they are released. As of 2024, there is no information on when the next episode of the game will be released.
