= List of Nekopara episodes =

Nekopara (Japanese: ネコぱら) is an anime series based on the visual novels developed by Neko Works and published by Sekai Project. Taking place in a world where humans live alongside adorable catgirls, the series follows Kashou Minaduki and Shigure Minaduki, siblings who have a family of catgirls named Chocola, Vanilla, Coconut, Azuki, Maple, Cinnamon and Cacao. It is centered around work life at Kashou's pâtisserie and home life at Shigure's family house.

An all-ages anime OVA adaptation was released on Steam in December 2017; it became one of the top earners in Steam in December 2017.

An anime television series adaptation by Felix Film premiered from January 9 to March 26, 2020. The anime is licensed in English-speaking regions by Funimation, which was renamed into Crunchyroll after its parent Sony Pictures Television acquired the streaming service of the same name from AT&T in 2021.

== Episode list ==
=== OVA ===
In July 2016, Sekai Project announced that it would be running a Kickstarter campaign to fund an all-ages Nekopara original video animation adaptation. The campaign launched in December 2016, and reached its US$100,000 funding goal "mere hours" after launching. The campaign ended on Kickstarter on February 11, 2017, and raised US$963,376 from 9,322 backers, however, was extended in order to reach the final stretch goal. In March 2017, the campaign formally ended on Sekai Project's "slacker backer" service, and raised a total of US$1,049,552. On December 4, 2017, Sekai Project announced that the OVA would be released on December 26, 2017, however, was later moved to December 22, 2017, due to a shipping error by Tokyo Otaku Mode, the company responsible for physical goods.

The opening theme for the OVA is "Baby→Lady LOVE" by Ray, while the ending theme is "▲MEW▲△MEW△CAKE" by Kotoko.

A second OVA, based on the Nekopara Extra visual novel, was released alongside the visual novel on July 27, 2018. The ending theme for Nekopara Extra is Symphony by Luce Twinkle Wink☆.

| No. | Title | Original release date |
|---|---|---|
| OVA–1 | "Nekopara"; Transliteration: "Nekopara OVA" (Japanese: ネコぱらOVA) | December 22, 2017 |
As Kashou Minaduki recently moves out of his family house in preparation of opening his own pâtisserie called "La Soleil", he discovers that two of his family catgirls named Chocola and Vanilla have stowed away in cardboard boxes just to stay with him. Although initially wanting Chocola and Vanilla to return to the family house, Kashou finally gets in contact with his younger sister Shigure Minaduki, who says that she will pick up Chocola and Vanilla if they want to come back. When Chocola and Vanilla sort out an error regarding an invoice order of tea sets, Kashou eventually has a change of heart, allowing Chocola and Vanilla to stay if they help him work at La Soleil. As Kashou officially opens La Soleil, Shigure terribly disguises herself as the first customer before the rest of the family catgirls (Coconut, Azuki, Maple and Cinnamon) also arrive and enjoy the pastries. Shigure informs Kashou that the catgirls must pass an exam and earn a cat bell as an "independent action permit" in order to avoid police custody and qualify for being employed and fitting into society. It is shown that Coconut, Azuki, Maple and Cinnamon have already earned their cat bells. Shigure prepares a crash course with the help of Coconut, Azuki, Maple and Cinnamon, though with some initial stumbles even with the help of Kashou. Chocola and Vanilla manage to pass the exam and earn their cat bells. Kashou rewards them with a trip to the amusement park and the aquarium. After being splashed during a dolphin show, Kashou unfortunately comes down with a fever and is consequently bedridden. Chocola and Vanilla worriedly rush to the clinic, but they forget to wear their cat bells and are stopped by two policewomen, who believe that Chocola and Vanilla are two stray catgirls. Kashou suddenly arrives with the cat bells and brings Chocola and Vanilla back home. Shigure appears with Coconut, Azuki, Maple and Cinnamon at La Soleil, offering to help Kashou, Chocola and Vanilla run the business as a family.
| OVA–2 | "Nekopara OVA Extra"; Transliteration: "Nekopara OVA Koneko no Hi no Yakusoku" (Japanese: ネコぱらOVA 仔ネコの日の約束) | July 27, 2018 |
This episode takes place six months before Kashou opened La Soleil. When Chocola and Vanilla were the latest addition to the Minaduki household, they take their monthly health exams. During breakfast, Chocola and Vanilla lap milk without holding their cups, though Shigure tells them not to be nervous. When food is served, Coconut, Azuki, Maple and Cinnamon use chopsticks. However, Kashou gives Chocola and Vanilla each a spoon and a bib. Late at night, Kashou finishes baking pastries, but finds Chocola and Vanilla huddled together in their bedroom. Kashou cuddles them as he reassures that they are part of the family. Chocola and Vanilla then wish to address Kashou as their "master". The next day, Chocola and Vanilla are embarrassed when they wet the bed from excitement. Two months later on Christmas Day, all six catgirls receive their various presents. After everyone enjoys the huge feast prepared by Kashou, they go outside in the snow. Chocola and Vanilla convince Kashou to have a party every year on Christmas Day.

=== Television anime ===
During the Comiket 95 event, it was announced that an anime television series adaptation was in production. The series is animated by Felix Film and directed by Yasutaka Yamamoto, with Gō Zappa handling series composition, Yuichi Hirano designing the characters, and Akiyuki Tateyama composing the music. The first episode of the television anime premiered at Anime Expo 2019 on July 6, 2019, and the first two episodes aired at a special event in Tokyo on December 24, 2019. The series premiered from January 9, 2020, until March 26, 2020, on AT-X, Tokyo MX, and BS11. The opening theme for the anime is "Shiny Happy Days" by Yuki Yagi, Iori Saeki, Shiori Izawa, Miku Itō, Yuri Noguchi, and Marin Mizutani. The series aired for 12 episodes. Funimation acquired the series for distribution in North America, the British Isles, and Australasia, streaming the series on FunimationNow, Wakanim and AnimeLab, and produced an English dub for the series.

| No. | Title (Note: All English titles are taken from Funimation.) | Original release date |
|---|---|---|
| 1 | "Welcome to La Soleil!"; Transliteration: "Yōkoso, Ra Soreiyu e!" (Japanese: ようこそ、ラ・ソレイユヘ！) | January 9, 2020 |
Chocola and Vanilla wake up in the morning and eat breakfast with chopsticks. Kashou Minaduki recalls when Chocola and Vanilla stowed away in cardboard boxes after he moved out of his family house in preparation of opening his pâtisserie La Soleil. Meanwhile, Kashou's younger sister Shigure Minaduki starts her morning routine at the family house with Coconut, Azuki, Maple and Cinnamon. While Coconut and Azuki end up in a tussle, Maple and Cinnamon head to La Soleil by train. As La Soleil officially opens, Chocola and Vanilla serve their first customers. When Maple and Cinnamon finally arrive, Chocola and Vanilla are relieved of their duties. After the work shift, Maple and Cinnamon leave seared tuna in the refrigerator for Kashou, Chocola and Vanilla to enjoy. Chocola decides to shop for ponzu vinegar in order for the seared tuna to be tastier. At a playground along the way, Chocola finds a young catgirl, who hides in the bushes after Chocola attempts to give her some chocolate candy. When Chocola returns to La Soleil with the ponzu vinegar, she is surprised that the young catgirl followed her all the way home.
| 2 | "A Lost Kitten?"; Transliteration: "Maigo no Koneko-chan?" (Japanese: 迷子の仔ネコちゃん？) | January 16, 2020 |
After realizing that the young catgirl is homeless, Chocola brings her inside. Chocola does her best to prevent the young catgirl from being seen by Kashou in the bathroom. However, Chocola is caught red-handed when Vanilla finds her feeding dried fish to the young catgirl in the bedroom. After Vanilla understands the situation, Chocola fears that Kashou would not allow the young catgirl to stay. Instead, Kashou contacts Shigure, who agrees to let the young catgirl stay with her while beginning a search for any possible owners. Coconut, Azuki, Maple and Cinnamon are curious about the young catgirl as their new houseguest. After dismissing Coconut, Azuki, Maple and Cinnamon, Shigure bathes the young catgirl and prepares her for bedtime. Meanwhile, Chocola and Vanilla also prepare for bedtime. Chocola is worried about the young catgirl, but Vanilla reassures that everything will be fine. Vanilla then says that she will always be with Chocola.
| 3 | "The One My Mind"; Transliteration: "Ki ni Naru Ano Ko" (Japanese: 気になるあの子) | January 23, 2020 |
The next morning, Shigure, Coconut, Azuki, Maple and Cinnamon learn that the young catgirl was sleeping in the bathroom on top of the toilet seat. Meanwhile, Vanilla notices Chocola constantly worrying about the young catgirl, which causes Chocola to do clumsy things during her morning routine. During breakfast, Shigure tells Coconut, Azuki, Maple and Cinnamon that the young catgirl cannot be named without permission, even though Azuki first came up with the name Sugarcane. Coconut and Azuki arrive at La Soleil in order to help out, but they try to outperform each other. Maple and Cinnamon attempt to have afternoon tea with the young catgirl, but the young catgirl chooses to eat dried fish instead. The young catgirl shows disinterest in other activities and opts to play with one of Chocola's old toys. Some time later, Shigure notifies Chocola that the young catgirl has gone missing. After tirelessly searching, Chocola goes to the playground and finds the young catgirl, who wants to stay with Chocola. When Chocola brings the young catgirl back to La Soleil, Kashou allows the young catgirl to stay with Chocola as long as Chocola takes good care of the young catgirl.
| 4 | "The First Time...!"; Transliteration: "Hajimete no...!" (Japanese: はじめての…！) | January 30, 2020 |
After breakfast, the young catgirl watches television while Chocola and Vanilla serve customers. After getting bored of watching television, the young catgirl wanders into the dining area, but Chocola tells her to play in the bedroom. Instead, the young catgirl move around under a cardboard box in the kitchen, but she is startled when Kashou drops a mixing bowl onto the floor. The young catgirl quickly eats a cacao cake that Kashou gives as a peace offering. Chocola and Vanilla use their free time in order to play with the young catgirl until she falls asleep. At the family house, Shigure takes the measurements and weights of Coconut, Azuki, Maple and Cinnamon. When Chocola and Vanilla bring the young catgirl to the family house for their measurements and weights, Vanilla suggests that the young catgirl should be named Cacao. Shigure tests all the catgirls on their kinetic vision, displaying various objects that zoom across the screen, in which Cacao is the only one who correctly identifies the final object. Afterwards, they all visit the beach until sunset, planning to return during swimming season and pack a picnic lunch.
| 5 | "Cacao's Adventure"; Transliteration: "Kakao no Bōken" (Japanese: カカオの冒険) | February 6, 2020 |
Chocola and Vanilla await for Kashou to greet them, but they are met with his cold reception. Chocola and Vanilla try to figure out why Kashou is despondent, and they end up believing that he is struggling financially. As Chocola and Vanilla distribute business cards outside La Soleil, they receive help from Maple and Cinnamon, who attract more customers by offering a free photo with every cake purchase. Cacao helps out by putting the business cards inside local mailboxes, but she gets lost along the way. She bumps into a young girl named Chiyo, who shares taiyaki in the playground. Chiyo offers to help Cacao find her way back to La Soleil, but they are soon chased by a murder of crows. After Cacao manages to scare off the crows, they return to the playground, where Chiyo finds a business card that was tucked inside Cacao's hat. Chocola and Vanilla learn that Kashou was trying to come up with a new cake for the summer season. Thanks to the map depicted on the back of the business card, Chiyo manages to help Cacao sneak back inside La Soleil without being detected.
| 6 | "Battles Without Honor and Cat-Humanity!"; Transliteration: "Jingi Nyaki Tatakai!" (Japanese: 仁義ニャき戦い！) | February 13, 2020 |
The frequent bickering of Coconut and Azuki at home and at work leads Shigure to host a sports competition with Chocola, Maple and Coconut versus Vanilla, Cinnamon and Azuki. Coconut and Azuki both break stance in a game of Twister during the first round. Chocola and Vanilla both show resilience in food resisting during the second round. Maple and Cinnamon both lack resilience with a mystery cardboard box containing bananas during the third round. In a spoon relay race during the fourth round, Coconut and Azuki are both disqualified after dropping their ping-pong balls from their spoons right before the finish line. Chocola, Vanilla and Maple win their respective sumo wrestling matches using only their hips against Cinnamon, Coconut and Azuki during the fifth round. Coconut and Azuki compete in a massive cat-themed obstacle course during the final round, which ends in a draw after Azuki prevents Coconut from falling off the climbing wall. The two reconcile after Coconut realizes that Azuki always looked after Coconut for her clumsiness.
| 7 | "House-Sitting Cats"; Transliteration: "Nekotachi no Orushuban" (Japanese: ネコたちのお留守番) | February 20, 2020 |
During a thunderstorm, Chocola, Vanilla, Coconut, Azuki, Maple, Cinnamon and Cacao house-sit for Kashou and Shigure, who are both away from home. Due to the severity of the thunderstorm, Kashou has to make an emergency stop on his way to a strawberry farm, while Shigure has to book a hotel room after enjoying an in-person gathering for her online group. As the catgirls fend for themselves at night, Vanilla tells a ghost story during a blackout in order to pass the time. When the electrical power restores, Chocola, Maple, Coconut and Azuki take turns telling fairy tales, including Hansel and Gretel, Aladdin and Sleeping Beauty. However, these reveal the flaws and habits of all the catgirls. As another blackout occurs, the catgirls hear footsteps approaching the front door. The catgirls are terrified upon seeing a drenched Shigure, who chose to walk all the way home in the rain.
| 8 | "The Melancholy of Shigure"; Transliteration: "Shigure no Yūutsu" (Japanese: 時雨の憂鬱) | February 27, 2020 |
One summer morning, Coconut, Azuki, Maple and Cinnamon become worried when Shigure wakes up feeling depressed and serves them an unsavory breakfast. Even when Coconut, Azuki, Maple and Cinnamon pitch in with housekeeping, Shigure has her mind distracted and her appetite lost. Believing that Shigure misses Kashou since he has not visited recently, Coconut, Azuki, Maple and Cinnamon send Shigure to work with Chocola and Vanilla for the day at La Soleil. However, Shigure does not do well with serving the customers. The catgirls recruit Kashou to console Shigure with a cup of chamomile tea and a plate of matcha green tea roll cake. Shigure reveals that she does not know the cause of her depression, but she still supports Kashou. Coconut, Azuki, Maple and Cinnamon later follow Shigure all the way to the edge of a cliff, where they declare their unending love for her. Shigure reverts to her cheerful self, inadvertently pulling Coconut, Azuki, Maple and Cinnamon with her into the ocean below. Back at the family house, Shigure tells them that she was depressed because they did not snuggle with her at night due to the summer heat.
| 9 | "True Feelings"; Transliteration: "Honto no Kokoro" (Japanese: ホントノココロ) | March 5, 2020 |
On their day off, Kashou and Shigure bring all seven catgirls to an amusement park. They visit the various amusement rides and even a haunted house. Afterwards, they attend a stage performance of Maple and Cinnamon's favorite anime series. When Cinnamon volunteers to participate as a hostage, she forcefully recruits Maple to participate as the singing hero, making the stage performance a success. Maple begins taking up a part-time job at a music store, but Cinnamon soon finds out about this. Because she dreams of becoming a professional singer, Maple plans on making money in order to buy a guitar. Thanks to Kashou, Maple learns about an upcoming singing contest, where the winner is prized with a white guitar. Over the next few days, Maple undergoes intense vocal training with the help of the others. On the day of the singing contest, Maple chickens out and nearly leaves the venue. However, Cinnamon finds Maple outside the venue and manages to snap her out of her funk. Regaining her confidence, Maple ends up winning the singing contest. She thanks the others for their support.
| 10 | "Oh No! Bell Renewal Exams"; Transliteration: "Nyagān! Suzu no Kōshin Shiken" (Japanese: ニャがーん！鈴の更新試験) | March 12, 2020 |
Kashou informs Chocola and Vanilla about their license renewal exams for their cat bells, which is proof that they adapted to human society. After Chocola has some mishaps at work, she fears that she might fail the license renewal exams. Chocola and Vanilla soon request Coconut, Azuki, Maple and Cinnamon to help them train for the renewal exams. Initially fooled into pitching in with housekeeping, Chocola and Vanilla prepare for the real training. Azuki teaches about outdoor safety, Coconut teaches about controlling feline instincts, Cinnamon teaches about natural human behavior and Maple teaches about outdoor activities, though they all have flaws in their subjects. Cacao is shown to excel in all areas during the training. Chocola and Vanilla take and pass their license renewal exams, later informing Shigure and Cacao about their achievement. As a reward, Shigure takes Chocola, Vanilla and Cacao to a temple festival, passing by a shrine, a gift shop and a sushi restaurant. They also visit many unique cafes as a learning experience.
| 11 | "Cacao Repays Her Debts"; Transliteration: "Kakao no Ongaeshi" (Japanese: カカオの恩返し) | March 19, 2020 |
Cacao is invited to a sleepover with Chiyo at her house. Shigure, Chocola and Vanilla drop off Cacao at Chiyo's house. Returning to work, Chocola and Vanilla become distracted by their constant worry over Cacao. As night rolls on, Cacao has fun with Chiyo, while Chocola and Vanilla think about Cacao during dinnertime, bathtime and bedtime. The next day, Cacao returns home, but she confuses Chocola and Vanilla when she instantly runs away and hides inside a cardboard box. Coconut smokes fish and Maple sings a song in a failed attempt to bring Cacao out of hiding. During dinner, Chocola and Vanilla share their soy sauce dried fish with Cacao, who soon emerges from the cardboard box. Cacao reads them a letter of thanks, looking back on all the adventures. When Cacao shows a picture of Chocola and Vanilla, they promise to be by her side. As the three of them go to sleep, the picture is shown to be framed on the bedroom wall.
| 12 | "Summer Beach Cat Paradise!"; Transliteration: "Natsu da! Umi da! Nekoparadaisu!" (Japanese: 夏だ！海だ！ネコぱらだいす！) | March 26, 2020 |
On another summer day, it is time again for the monthly health exams for all seven catgirls, including their improved measurements and kinetic vision. While enjoying a slice of watermelon and a cup of iced tea, the catgirls decide to return to the beach. Before then, the catgirls go shopping for new swimsuits. Chocola and Vanilla pick out a swimsuit and an inflatable tuna pool toy for Cacao. Kashou, Shigure, Chocola, Vanilla, Coconut, Azuki, Maple, Cinnamon and Cacao arrive at the beach. They relax after having fun in the sun. However, Cacao is shown drifting out to sea in her inflatable tuna pool toy. A local beach clubhouse owner quickly and easily rescues Cacao. In order to repay the debt, the family attracts customers to the beach clubhouse with their advertising, resulting in a booming business. After arranging for some local stray catgirls to live with the beach clubhouse owner, Shigure strongly believes that there is nothing better than a life with catgirls.
