= Studio Élan =

American video game developer and publisher

- Type: Private
- Industry: Video games
- Founded: 2017; 9 years ago
- Founders: Josh Kaplan
- Headquarters: U.S.
- Website: vnstudioelan.com

Studio Élan is an independent video game developer and publisher founded in 2017 by Josh Kaplan. They specialise in yuri-genre visual novels and are best known for their first two titles, Highway Blossoms and Heart of the Woods.

== History ==
Studio Élan first began as an amateur game development group under the name Alienworks. Between working on another project within Alienworks, Syon Santeria pitched fellow member Josh Kaplan on creating a yuri visual novel as a smaller side project. The idea interested Kaplan and the pair began development of Highway Blossoms. Sekai Project announced the game at Anime Weekend Atlanta on September 26, 2015, and in 2016 opened a Steam Greenlight page for the game. Highway Blossoms was initially released without any voice acting and its sound was limited to an acoustic soundtrack. An adult content patch was made freely available. The developer later released a remastered version of the game featuring voice-overs for the characters.

Highway Blossoms received positive reviews for its visuals, story, and soundtrack. Kaplan also noted that the game "ended up being unexpectedly successful," stating that "it found an audience of primarily LGBT readers who appreciated what they felt was a more realistic approach to same-sex relationships." Due to the game's success, Kaplan went on to found Studio Élan in February 2017. In October, Highway Blossoms's publisher Sekai Project announced that Élan would be working on two further visual novels. One of these was Heart of the Woods, which would be released in 2019. The studio's work would go on to garner a reputation for commonly featuring LGBTQ+ and sapphic themes. In a 2018 interview, the head of the studio stated that "the majority" of studio members are LGBT women.

In 2019, the studio announced Lock and Key, a magical girl yuri visual novel. In February 2020, Studio Élan announced that they would begin publishing visual novels under their newly formed "Bellhouse" label, with First Snow as their first title. They further released Highway Blossoms: Next Exit, downloadable content (DLC) for Highway Blossoms in 2020. Also in February, the release a trailer for Summer At the Edge of the Universe, which was set for release in 2021. In April 2021, Studio Elan announced plans for a console port of Highway Blossoms.

In October 2022, the studio merged with Studio Coattails. In November, the studio released Please Be Happy. In April 2023, Heart of the Woods received a limited physical release. Later in October, the studio published Twofold, a visual novel following non-binary college student Olive Penn.

== Games ==
=== Games developed ===
Title	Platform(s)	Publication date	Ref.
Highway Blossoms	Windows, MacOS, Linux	June 17, 2016	
The Waters Above: Prelude	Windows, MacOS, Linux	June 27, 2018	
Heart of the Woods	Windows, MacOS, Linux, PlayStation 4, PlayStation 5, Nintendo Switch, Xbox One, Xbox Series X/S	February 15, 2019	
Please Be Happy	Windows, MacOS, Linux, PlayStation 4, PlayStation 5, Nintendo Switch, Xbox One, Xbox Series X/S	November 21, 2022	
A Tithe in Blood	Windows, MacOS, Linux	June 16, 2025	
Upwards, Rain! The Post Office of Farewells	Windows, MacOS, Linux	July 1, 2025	
Lock and Key: A Magical Girl Mystery	Windows, MacOS, Linux	September 30, 2025	
Witch You Want	Windows, MacOS, Linux	February 14, 2026	
Our Home, My Keeper	Windows, MacOS, Linux	April 30, 2026	
Summer At the Edge of the Universe	Windows, MacOS, Linux	TBA	

=== Games published ===
Title	Developer	Platform(s)	Publication date	Ref.
National Park Girls	Studio Coattails	Windows, MacOS, Linux	March 14, 2019	
Without A Voice	L³	Windows, MacOS, Linux	March 20, 2020	
First Snow	Salty Salty Studios	Windows, MacOS, Linux	August 19, 2020	
Who Is The Red Queen?	4noki	Windows, MacOS, Linux	August 15, 2022	
Twofold	Salty Salty Studios	Windows, MacOS, Linux	October 27, 2023	
Love In a Bottle	lovelandisle	Windows	TBA	
