= Narcissu =

2005 video game

- Developer: Stage-nana
- Publishers: Insani (English version); Sekai Project
- Designer: Tomo Kataoka
- Engine: NScripter (JP); ONScripter (EN)
- Platforms: Mac OS X, Linux, Microsoft Windows
- Release: 2005
- Genre: Visual novel
- Mode: Single player

Narcissu (Japanese: ナルキッソス, Hepburn: Narukissosu) is a free visual novel video game developed by the dōjin group Stage-nana, telling the story of a terminally ill young man and woman. It was made with the NScripter engine.

The work was originally written in Japanese by Tomo Kataoka, and subsequently localized and translated into English, Chinese, French, Korean, Russian and Vietnamese by various fan translators. Unlike most fan translations, however, this was an authorised work. The author, however, was not actively involved in the translation process as it had been the case for True Remembrance. Both the original Japanese visual novel and its English version were released as free downloads over the Internet. The web edition of Narcissu has lower graphics and music quality, to conserve bandwidth.

Narcissu is an experimental work: it uses minimalist graphics in a very narrow window, and includes two full scripts, one accompanied by a voice track, and the other adapted to work without voices. In the English translation, different translators translated each version, to provide different perspectives on the story.

== Synopsis ==
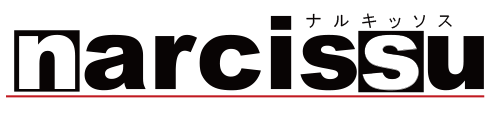
Narcissu logo

The anonymous protagonist is diagnosed with lung cancer shortly after his twentieth birthday, and is admitted to hospice care at a hospital in Mito, Ibaraki. There he meets Setsumi, a woman who is two years older than he is, who is also terminally ill. Finding that they both refuse to die in the hospital or at home with their families, they run away together in a silver Honda Integra belonging to the protagonist's father.

They travel west across Japan's many highways and prefectures, initially not knowing where to go, but later collectively decide on taking the narcissus fields of southern Awaji Island as a somewhat arbitrary destination.

== Characters ==
The Protagonist
A young man, 20 years of age. Your typical university student. Attends a technical institute, and has just taken (and passed) his driver's license examination. Lives with his family—a taciturn and unsupportive mother and father and a little sister who only ever has harsh words for him. Has never really been sick in his entire life. Has never really had much of an aim for his entire life, either.
The protagonist's name is never given in the first two games, but is revealed to be Yuu Atou (阿東 優, Atou Yuu) in various supplementary works.

Setsumi Sakura (佐倉 瀬津美, Sakura Setsumi)
Voiced by: Rino Ayakawa
A young woman, 22 years of age. Has a body physique like a child. She has a quiet personality. She loves cars and is knowledgeable about them. She expresses to the protagonist her desire to die neither at the seventh floor of the hospital nor at her home.

Himeko Shinohara is the protagonist of the 2nd Side prequel.

Yuka Akishima is the 23-year-old best friend of Himeko.

Chihiro Shinohara is the 21-year-old younger sister of Himeko. She is a devout Christian.

== Release history ==
The original Japanese version uses the NScripter engine; for the English localization, the open source clone ONScripter was used instead, as this has been modified to support English. Narcissu has also been ported to the Nintendo DS.

A second game and a prequel named Narcissu: Side 2nd was released on May 15, 2007 while the third game in the series named Narcissu 3rd - Die Dritte Welt - was released on April 27, 2009. The final game in the series named Narcissu - if there was a tomorrow - (ナルキッソス～もしも明日があるなら～, Narcissu - moshimo ashita ga aru nara -) was developed by Kadokawa Shoten playable on the PlayStation Portable. The final game is a compilation of all three games with some new extra content added. It was released on June 24, 2010.

A complete remake of the Narcissu series, published by Sekai Project has been announced. It will include all of the previous Narcissu games with updated graphics and audio, as well as a new 4th Narcissu game.

== Influences ==
Narcissu is both stylistically and thematically similar to the opening chapter of Gin'iro, a commercial title by the same writer; Tomo Kataoka himself describes it as essentially a modern-day version of Gin'iro, which is set in medieval Japan.

On a level more familiar to Western audiences, the work has much in common with road movies; the screen layout is even intended to evoke a cinema screen. Many of the scenes and events of the story are road-movie clichés, and the ending, in which the physical journey itself is explicitly linked with the metaphorical journeys the characters have undergone (their lives, their self-discovery), is typical of the movie genre.

== Soundtrack ==
Several of the music tracks in Narcissu are arrangements from other visual novels. 12 of the game's music tracks are accessible on-demand via the in-game jukebox, which is called the "Sound Mode".

The titles in the following list are based on the Sound Mode of Narcissu: Side 2nd, which contains updated and corrected titles; in the original release of Narcissu, Tracks 2, 3, 7, 8 and 12 had slightly different titles, while Tracks 4 and 9 were incorrectly listed as "Rather Than a Life of Finality" and "Eightmoon" respectively. However, Narcissu: Side 2nd still mislabels the source of Track 4 as "The World is Coming to an W/end", instead of "The world is drawing to an W/end".

No.	Title	Music	Length
1.	"The Emerald Sea"	MASA	2:18
2.	"The Silver Coupé"	Ebi	2:33
3.	"Narcissus (inst.)"	Ebi	2:01
4.	"From The world is drawing to an W/end" (Arranged by Kometto Nekono)	Masashi Yano	3:43
5.	"I'm Right Here (vocal ver.)" (Vocals by Mari Mizuta, lyrics by Tsukasa Umitomi)	Hirofumi Ishihashi	4:47
6.	"Lamune 79's" (From Lamune, arranged by Kometto Nekono)	Elements Garden	3:08
7.	"Route 1"	Sentive	2:37
8.	"The Seventh"	Sentive	2:15
9.	"Sakura" (From A ¥120 Spring, arranged by Shitoshi Fujimoto)	Ebi	2:16
10.	"The Emerald Sea (ver. 2)"	MASA	2:17
11.	"Scarlet" (From Mizuiro, arranged by Hirofumi Ishihashi)	Noriyasu Agematsu	3:07
12.	"Narcissus/Setsumi's Theme" (Vocals by REM, lyrics by Tomo Kataoka)	Ebi	2:25

== Print adaptations ==
On 25 July 2008, MF Bunko J released a light novel adaptation of Narcissu and Narcissu -side 2nd-, which was written by Tomo Kataoka himself and illustrated by GotoP. The novel is licensed in Chinese by Tong Li Publishing, and licensed in Korean by Haksan Culture Company.

A manga illustrated by Pochi Edoya started serialization in the seinen manga magazine Monthly Comic Alive on 27 November 2008. Two bound volumes have been released by Media Factory under their MF Comics label, and are licensed in Chinese by Sharp Point Press.
