= My Girlfriend Is Shobitch =

Japanese manga and anime series

- Cover of the first tankōbon volume, featuring Akiho Kosaka

僕の彼女がマジメ過ぎる処女ビッチな件 (Boku no Kanojo ga Majime Sugiru Shojo Bitchi na Ken)
- Genre: Romantic comedy; Slice of life
- Manga
- Written by: Namiru Matsumoto
- Published by: Kadokawa Shoten
- Imprint: Kadokawa Comics Ace
- Magazine: Niconico Seiga; Comic Walker; Comic Newtype
- Original run: July 20, 2015 – September 13, 2019
- Volumes: 8
- Anime television series
- Directed by: Nobuyoshi Nagayama
- Produced by: Jun'ichirō Tamura; Takashi Tachizaki
- Written by: Hideki Shirane
- Music by: Shunsuke Takizawa
- Studio: Diomedéa; Studio Blanc
- Licensed by: AUS: Madman Entertainment; NA: Sentai Filmworks; UK: MVM Films
- Original network: AT-X, Tokyo MX, KBS, Sun TV, MTV, TVQ, GBS, BS11
- Original run: October 12, 2017 – December 13, 2017
- Episodes: 10 + OVA
- icon

My Girlfriend Is Shobitch (僕の彼女がマジメ過ぎる処女ビッチな件, Boku no Kanojo ga Majime Sugiru Shojo Bitchi na Ken) (Note: Shobitch is a portmanteau of the words shojo and bitch, and is only used for the anime series. Shojo (処女) is a Japanese word meaning virgin, while in Japan the English word bitch—pronounced "bitchi" (ビッチ)—is used to mean slutty or promiscuous. Therefore, a more accurate translation of the title would be "My Girlfriend is a Slutty Virgin".) is a Japanese manga written and illustrated by Namiru Matsumoto. It was serialized online on Niconico Seiga from July 2015 to September 2019. An anime television series adaptation by Diomedéa and Studio Blanc aired from October to December 2017.

== Synopsis ==
With nothing left to lose, ordinary high school student Haruka Shinozaki confesses to beautiful, diligent class representative Akiho Kosaka and to his surprise she accepts. Akiho takes dating as seriously as she does everything else, but does not quite get it. She pragmatically suggests activities that are too sexual.

== Characters ==
Haruka Shinozaki (篠崎 遥, Shinozaki Haruka)
Voiced by: Mitsuhiro Ichiki (Japanese); Gareth West (English)
Haruka is a shy and gentle boy who is a second-year in high school. He is quite popular with the girls in his neighborhood, but remains unaware of, or is simply not interested in, their romantic inclinations towards him. He has sexual fantasies, but is too shy to express them. He has been in love with Akiho since he was a high school first-year, but once she agrees to become his girlfriend, he finds out some things about her which he has some trouble to getting used to.
Akiho Kosaka (香坂 秋穂, Kosaka Akiho)
Voiced by: Aoi Yūki (Japanese); Katelyn Barr (English)
Akiho is a beautiful, aloof-looking high school second-year model student and popular girl in her class, and Haruka's love interest. However, she has absolutely no experience with intimate relationships and thus tends to overanalyze this topic in her nervousness. She has the habit of approaching sexual topics in a straightforward manner, a trait which was ingrained into her by her mother at an early age, hence the name.
Shizuku Ariyama (有山 雫, Ariyama Shizuku)
Voiced by: Larissa Tago Takeda (Japanese); Christina Kelly (English)
Shizuku is a lively third-year high school student and childhood friend of Haruka, who merely sees her as an older sister and thus addresses her as such. However, she has recently become romantically interested in Haruka as well and makes several playful and obvious allusions towards him, even though she is too shy to take the initiative when things have a chance to get serious.
Rina Saijō (西城 梨奈, Saijō Rina)
Voiced by: Natsumi Yamada (Japanese); Amber Lee Connors (English)
Rina is a charismatic girl from a wealthy family who transferred to Haruka's school in search of a boyfriend. Like Akiho, she is very liberal in talking about sex-related matters, but since she previously attended an all-girl school and could only find romance with other girls, her experience in romancing males is practically non-existent. She owns two dogs, Butter and Margarine, whom she regards like human beings.
Kanata Shinozaki (篠崎 奏多, Shinozaki Kanata)
Voiced by: Yuki Yagi (Japanese); Brittany Lauda (English)
Kanata is Haruka's younger sister by one year, who adopts a cat-like behavior pattern and is seldom seen without her cat-ear hoodie jacket. She is very infatuated with her older brother and considers herself the only girl cute enough to be his girlfriend. One of her favorite interactions with him is to have him pet her on the head.
Saori Igarashi (五十嵐沙織, Igarashi Saori)
Voiced by: Juri Nagatsuma (Japanese); Joslin Johnson (English)
Saori is Haruka and Akiho's classmate, as well as the class president. She is a moralist and a prudish girl who tends to overreact, thereby driving herself hysterical for no plausible reason.
Sayo Shizumori (静森早夜, Suzumori Sayo)
Voiced by: Miki Hase (Japanese); Juliet Simmons (English)
Sayo is a girl who keeps her hair hanging in front of her eyes. She is very shy in personal relations, but likes to peep on romantic couples and excite herself on what she sees.
Misaki Aikawa (愛川美咲, Aikawa Misaki)
Voiced by: Marin Mizutani (Japanese); Margaret McDonald (English)
Misaki is a classmate and friend of Kanata who works part-time in an ice cream shop. Like Akiho, she tends to associate everyday occurrences with sex-related fantasies; but unlike Akiho, she is terribly shy about her puberal imaginations.
Seiya Hoshikawa (星川 聖夜, Hoshikawa Seiya)
Voiced by: Arthur Lounsbery (Japanese); Daman Mills (English)
Hoshikawa is Haruka's classmate and a handsome, if narcissistic boy who enjoys the romantic attention of nearly every girl in school. However, Hoshikawa is only interested in male-to-male relationships, especially with Haruka, who naturally fails to notice the deeper significance of Hoshikawa's allusions.
Ichika Omori (大森一華, Omori Ichika)
Voiced by: Megumi Nakamura (Japanese); Carolyn Johnson (English)
Haruka and Akiho's homeroom and physical education teacher, and a former schoolmate and friend of Aoi Koshimizu.
Aoi Koshimizu (小清水葵, Koshimizu Aoi)
Voiced by: Iori Nomizu (Japanese); Courtney Lomelo (English)
She is one of the teachers at Haruka's school, as well as the school nurse. She is quite lecherous and stays long after closing hours in the infirmary to receive and get "entertained" by selected male students.
Fuyumi Kosaka (香坂 冬美, Kosaka Fuyumi)
Voiced by: Aya Saitō (Japanese); Rachael Messer (English)
Fuyumi is Akiho's mother, who greatly resembles her daughter in both appearance and demeanor.
Natsuo Kosaka (香坂 夏雄, Kosaka Natsuo)
Voiced by: Jun Miyamoto (Japanese); Alan Brinks (English)
Natsuo is Akiho's father, who in personality and looks shares many similarities with Haruka and, despite the years they have spent together, is still taken by surprise by his wife's peculiarities.

== Media ==
=== Manga ===
My Girlfriend Is Shobitch is written and illustrated by Namiru Matsumoto. It was serialized online on Niconico Seiga on July 20, 2015 to September 13, 2019, and it was also serialized on Comic Walker and Comic Newtype. The individual chapters are collected into eight tankōbon volumes published by Kadokawa.

No.	Release date	ISBN
1	April 9, 2016	978-4-0410-4146-8
2	October 26, 2016	978-4-0410-4874-0
3	March 25, 2017	978-4-0410-5550-2
4	August 10, 2017	978-4-0410-5985-2
5	October 10, 2017	978-4-0410-5986-9
6	May 26, 2018	978-4-04-106421-4; 978-4-04-106422-1 (LE)
7	January 10, 2019	978-4-04-107714-6
8	December 10, 2019	978-4-04-108098-6

=== Anime ===
A 10-episode anime television series adaptation aired from October 12 to December 13, 2017. The anime was directed by Nobuyoshi Nagayama and was animated as a collaboration of Diomedéa and Studio Blanc. The scripts were written by Hideki Shirane and character designs are by Shōko Yasuda. Nippon Columbia produced the music. An original video animation episode was bundled with the manga's sixth volume. The opening theme is "Eien Labyrinth" (永遠ラビリンス, Eternal Labyrinth) by Aoi Yūki, and the ending theme is "Koi no Himitsu" (恋のヒミツ, The Secret of Love) by Pua:re. Sentai Filmworks has licensed the series and they streamed on Anime Strike in North America, on Hidive outside of the U.S., and on AnimeLab in Australia and New Zealand. Sentai Filmworks released the series for home video with an English dub on February 12, 2019.

No.	Title (Note: All English titles are taken from Anime Strike.)	Original air date
1	"No, Don't Open It So Wide Please..." "Ya, Sonna ni Hirogenaide Kudasai..." (やっ、そんなに広げないで下さい…)	October 12, 2017
After a year of secret pining, second-year high schooler Haruka Shinozaki gathers the courage to ask popular class girl Akiho Kosaka to become his girlfriend. However, since this is Akiho's first romantic relationship as well, she begins to ask Haruka pragmatic questions about his sexual desires, so that he is left in doubt that this budding relationship will undergo a development for the better all too soon.
2	""Just Whip it Out Now!" ...Can I say that?" "'Sonomama Dashite!' ...tte Ieba Ii no?" (「そのまま出して!」 …って言えばいいの?)	October 19, 2017
Kanata learns that her older brother has a girlfriend now, and she tries her best to "endear" herself to him once again. Later, Akiho leads her class into the weekly campus clean-up and gains a new sentimental appreciation for Haruka's private possessions, and in order to serve Haruka a proper bento, she becomes desperate enough to ask Shizuku for cooking lessons, while Shizuku uses the opportunity to flirt with Haruka once again.
3	"Ah, This is My First Time Having Two at Once..." "N, Nihon Dōji wa Hajimete...desu." (んっ、二本同時は初めて…です。)	October 26, 2017
Akiho has invited Haruka to her home to introduce her to her parents. While Akiho leaves to fetch dinner supplies and her father Natsuo takes a walk to shake off his nervousness, Haruka arrives ahead of schedule and is thus welcomed by Akiho's mother, Fuyumi, alone. As she entertains him, Haruka discovers to his mounting disconcertion where Akiho's casual approach to sexual topics originates from, but with his modest and gentle manner wins her father's approval when he and Akiho return home. However, when Akiho and Haruka go out on their first official date, Akiho over-analyzes the topic once again, leading her to miss the emotional side of the occasion. She collapses from the shock of her realization and her subsequent tireless efforts to make things better, but recovers with Haruka's support and begins to regain hope for their future together.
4	"S-So This is How it Goes, Huh...." "Ko, Konna Fū ni Narun desu no ne..." (こ、こんな風になるんですのね…。)	November 2, 2017
A pretty girl named Rina Saijō transfers from the prestigious all-girls Shirogane Academy to Haruka and Akiho's mixed-gender school in search of a romance with a man. Befriending Haruka and Akiho, she eagerly begins to collect any information about how to form a male-female relationship from them, and in order to deepen her information, she takes the two to the zoo, where - again to Haruka's shock - he finds himself confronted with all sorts of ambiguous allusions whilst observing the wildlife. Following the visit, Haruka and Akiho encounter Akiho's parents, who have also visited the zoo on their own, and the four incidentally conclude the day taking a rest at a love hotel.
5	"It Tore... What do I do?!" "Yabure te tatte? dō shiyo!?" (破れてたって… どうしよう!?)	November 9, 2017
This episode consists of a succession of minor everyday occurrences. Rina has gotten herself a new smartphone and promptly asks Haruka several delicate questions about how to use it. Akiho attempts to learn how to predict Haruka's feelings in order to become a more effective girlfriend, naturally overdoing things in the process. She also stirs up chaos during a class representatives' meeting by suggesting a stronger promotion of sex education at school, and attempts to get her hiccups cured. Lastly, while going shopping, Kanata mistakenly replaces a box of chocolate-flavored condoms on a sweets shelf, causing some embarrassing misunderstandings between Misaki Aikawa, her friend and the shop's clerk.
6	"D-Don't Show This to Anyone Else, Okay?" "Ho, Hoka no Hito ni wa Misenai de ne?" (ほ、他の人には見せないでね?)	November 16, 2017
To Akiho's horror, Haruka's male classmate Hoshikawa begins to take a rather unhealthy interest in her boyfriend, plunging her into a state of panic every time she sees them together. During their school's summer sports festival Haruka is determined to prove himself a cool guy to Akiho by participating in the baseball tournaments, only to accidentally hit Hoshikawa (to the latter's enjoyment) in a sensitive spot with one of his batting attempts, and to find out in the end that Akiho does not mind the result as long as it is done for her sake.
7	"Jeez...I Can't Get My Mind Off of It.." "Mō...Nanimo Kangaerarenai..." (もう…何も考えられない…)	November 23, 2017
Haruka, Akiho and the rest of their schoolmates embark on their annual school camping trip. However, with lewd allusions and attempts at illicit intimacies heavy in the air, in one way or another the trip turns into a rather nerve-wracking experience for all participants.
8	"I-I'm Not Saying You Can Take It That Far!" "So, Soko Made Shite Ii Nante Ittenai!" (そ、そこまでしていいなんて言ってないっ!)	November 30, 2017
By happenstance, class president Saori Igarashi catches Haruka and his younger sister Kanata in what appears to be an incestuous moment (while in reality it was only a slight accident with a milk carton), and henceforth tries to expose Haruka as the "pervert" she thinks he is. Haruka's desperate attempts to clarify the misunderstanding only adds fuel to Saori's hysteria, until Saori notes that after her last toilet session she has accidentally stuck her skirt in her panties, which Haruka tried to point out to her, and ends up recognizing Haruka's discretional nature. In the second part of the episode, Akiho has forgotten to bring her panties along to school and desperately does what she can to hide this embarrassing mistake from Haruka, just as he tries to bring their relationship to its next level. In the third part, Haruka, Akiho and Rina accidentally get locked in the school's gym shed, which leaves the three of them in a highly compromising situation when Rina's bodyguards bust them out shortly afterwards.
9	"I Told You, Not So Suddenly!!" "Ikinari wa Dame tte Itta no niii!!" (いきなりはダメって言ったのにぃぃ!!)	December 6, 2017
Just before a planned date, Akiho's father comes down with a sore hip, forcing Akiho to cancel as she accompanies her parents to the hospital. Shizuku immediately hits upon this lifetime chance to go on a date with Haruka, even luring him to her house and then handcuffing herself to have him look after her (at least until Haruka finds the key to the cuffs in her pocket). The next day, Akiho catches them both together when Shizuku proposes to make a bento box for Haruka, and becomes obsessed with pleasing her boyfriend with her own cooking - a pledge which turns into a stress test for her confidence.
10	"I Can't... Take It... Any Longer!" "Mō, Gaman Deki, masen!" (もう、我慢でき、ませんっ!)	December 13, 2017
Final exams are approaching, and Haruka begins to receive a lot of moral support from his friends and younger sister Kanata (though not without ulterior motives). On a particularly hot summer day, Misaki Aikawa's ice cream parlor is visited by a number of very strange customers whose orders stir her imagination and embarrassment. Akiho spontaneously joins Haruka after he has fallen asleep at his classroom table, and during an outdoor school sketching meet Haruka unwittingly runs afoul of his fellow schoolmates while looking for a model. Akiho finally offers him her services, and in the course of them examining each other, the two of them confess their love.
OVA	"What If Akiho and Shinozaki are Stuck in a Room Where They Can't Get Out Unless They Have Sex" "Moshi Akiho to Shinozaki ga Se*kusu Shinai to Derenai Heya ni Tojikomeraretara" (もし篠崎と秋穂がセ○クスしないと出れない部屋に閉じ込められたら)	March 26, 2018
In the aftermath of a date, Akiho and Shinozaki seek shelter from a rainstorm at a hotel, where they share a bed without engaging in any intimacies. As they prepare to leave the next morning, however, they find that the hotel is a virtual reality game parlor that won't let them leave until they have had an "exciting time" within the next sixty minutes, lest they will be violated. Akiho and Shinozaki reluctantly comply, but before it comes to the worst, two puppets they had purchased on their date end up in a missionary position, which satisfies the parlor's AI and nullifies their confinement. During their finals, Shinozaki, Kanata, Rina and Shizuku fail their Health exam, and in their review session Koshimizu makes Akiho coach her schoolmates with an extremely lewd variant of the King's Game, which begins to excite the girls and disquiet Shinozaki.

== Reception ==
In a review of the anime for NEO, Alex Jones believed the developing relationship between Haruka and Akiho to be what made the premise work. However, he felt the jokes got more low-brow and generic with the more characters the series added, and ultimately felt that the miscommunication between the lead couple wasn't enough to carry the whole show.
