= Fault Milestone Two =

- Side: Above cover art
- Developer: Alice in Dissonance
- Publisher: Sekai Project: JP: Alice in Dissonance
- Director: Munisix
- Artist: Hare Konatsu
- Writer: Munisix
- Engine: Ren'Py
- Platforms: Microsoft Windows, OS X, Linux, PlayStation 4, Nintendo Switch
- Release: Side: Above: JP: August 16, 2015; WW: September 8, 2015; Side: Below: WW: TBA
- Genre: Visual novel
- Mode: Single-player

Fault Milestone Two is a visual novel developed by Alice in Dissonance and published by Sekai Project for Microsoft Windows, OS X, and Linux. It is the second entry in the Fault series, and is set immediately after the events of Fault Milestone One. The game features no player choices, and follows the characters of Selphine and Ritona, who were transported across the world following an attack on their kingdom of Rughzenhaide. Together, with their newfound friend Rune, the game follows their attempt to return to Rughzenhaide to confront the forces that lead the attack.

The game is written and directed by Munisix, with artwork by Hare Konatsu. It was originally intended to be released as a single game, but was split into two episodes due to its length and how the developers did not want to raise its price to match. The first episode, Side: Above, was released in 2015, while the second, Side: Below, is in development. The episodes are designed to fit around the prequel game Fault: Silence the Pedant, which is under development. According to Munisix, the first episode was a commercial success.

== Synopsis ==
=== Structure, characters and setting ===
Fault Milestone Two is a linear visual novel without player choices. It is set in a world where magic exists, and takes place immediately after the events of its predecessor Fault Milestone One. It follows the characters of Selphine and Ritona, who have been transported far away following an attack on their homeland, the kingdom of Rughzenhaide. Together, with their newfound friend Rune, they attempt to return home to confront the forces that lead the attack.

== Development ==
The game was developed by the doujin group Alice in Dissonance as part of Project Written, the name of their operations. It was directed and written by Munisix, with character designs and other art by Hare Konatsu. Munisix had previously intended to localize Fault Milestone One himself, but Sekai Project ended up doing the localization following a crowdfunding campaign in 2014; because of this, Munisix was able to focus on the development of Fault Milestone Two. While the game had originally been intended to be released during Comiket in January 2015, it ended up being delayed. Alice in Dissonance stated that the game was playable from start to finish, but that several sections of the game required improvements before the game could be released.

In July 2015, they announced that the game would be broken up into the two episodes, known as Side: Above and Side: Below, as they thought the story had gotten too long to be sold for US$15, with Side: Above being roughly the same length as Fault Milestone One, and they wanted to avoid raising the price to match. Due to this split, they had to rein in some story elements, which Munisix later stated was a beneficial thing, as those elements could have otherwise gone out of control. Munisix briefly considered giving Side: Below the title of Milestone Three, but decided against it as they wanted each "milestone" to have its own consistent theme. For Fault Milestone Two, the theme is explored in different ways in each of the episodes. They were designed so that they could fit around the upcoming prequel game, Fault: Silence the Pedant. Like with Fault Milestone One, the developers wanted to include one player choice in Side: Above; they had one in mind, but eventually had to remove it as it broke the flow of the story. A new presentation system was added for the game, intended to make the experience more immersive and feel "larger than life".

== Release and localization ==
Fault Milestone Two is being released in two episodes: Side: Above and Side: Below. The first episode was released for Microsoft Windows, OS X and Linux on August 16, 2015, in Japanese, and in English on September 8, 2015. The second episode was originally planned to be released in 2017 before being pushed back to an unannounced date. Side: Above will also be released for the PlayStation 4 and Nintendo Switch in December 2020.

Work on the game's localization began in January 2015, when Sekai Project stated that they had started the planning phase of the localization, released a teaser trailer for it. A demo was released in April 2015. It was first only made available for people who had backed Fault Milestone One's crowdfunding campaign on Kickstarter, but was later released to the public.

== Reception ==
Reception

Review score
Publication	Score
Hardcore Gamer	3/5

According to Munisix, the game was a commercial success, with the series selling over 420,000 copies combined by March 2018. The Steam release of Side: Above had an estimated total of 50,000 players by July 2018. It was reviewed by Marcus Estrada at Hardcore Gamer, who said that the plot was less dramatic than that of Fault Milestone One, but still managed to be compelling and giving insight into the characters of Ritona, Rune, Selphine and Rhegan; he did however think that it felt like a detour from the main plot, and that the episode's ending felt "truncated". He criticized it for being short, and said that the lack of player choices meant that there was little reason to replay it. He said that the game's visuals looked "gorgeous" and worked well with the story, and that the art style was above the more "standardized anime art" used in other visual novels from the same time. He also enjoyed the music, saying that the soundtrack was "full of standouts" that emphasized the story well; one criticism he had was that there wasn't more music for some scenes that only use ambient sounds.
