= The Fruit of Grisaia =

Japanese visual novel and its franchise

- Original visual novel cover

グリザイアの果実 (Gurizaia no Kajitsu)
- Genre: Harem; Psychological drama
- Video game
- Developer: Frontwing
- Publisher: JP: Frontwing; JP: Prototype (PSP/PSV); WW: Sekai Project
- Genre: Eroge, Visual novel
- Platform: Windows, PlayStation Portable, PlayStation Vita, Nintendo Switch
- Released: Microsoft Windows: JP: February 25, 2011; WW: May 29, 2015; PlayStation Portable: JP: February 21, 2013; PlayStation Vita: JP: August 8, 2013
- Video game

The Labyrinth of Grisaia
- Developer: Frontwing
- Publisher: JP: Frontwing; JP: Prototype (PSP/PSV); WW: Sekai Project
- Genre: Eroge, Visual novel
- Platform: Windows, PlayStation Portable, PlayStation Vita
- Released: Microsoft Windows: JP: February 24, 2012; WW: June 22, 2016; PlayStation Portable: JP: October 30, 2014; PlayStation Vita: JP: October 30, 2014
- Manga

The Fruit of Grisaia: Sanctuary Fellows
- Written by: Eiji Narumi
- Illustrated by: Shū Hirose
- Published by: Akita Shoten
- Magazine: Champion Red Ichigo (2013–14); Champion Cross (2014)
- Original run: April 5, 2013 – November 18, 2014
- Volumes: 4
- Video game

The Eden of Grisaia
- Developer: Frontwing
- Publisher: JP: Frontwing; JP: Prototype (PSP/PSV); WW: Sekai Project
- Genre: Eroge, Visual novel
- Platform: Windows, PlayStation Portable, PlayStation Vita
- Released: Microsoft Windows: JP: May 24, 2013; WW: April 28, 2017; PlayStation Portable: JP: December 11, 2014; PlayStation Vita: JP: December 11, 2014
- Manga

The Fruit of Grisaia: L'Oiseau bleu
- Written by: Jun'ichi Fujisaku
- Illustrated by: Taka Himeno
- Published by: Mag Garden
- Magazine: Monthly Comic Blade; Monthly Comic Garden
- Original run: March 28, 2014 – September 5, 2015
- Volumes: 3
- Anime television series
- Directed by: Tensho
- Produced by: Asuka Yamazaki; Kazuhiro Kanemitsu; Mitsutoshi Ogura; Ryuichiro Yamakawa; Tatsuya Ueki
- Written by: Hideyuki Kurata
- Music by: Elements Garden
- Studio: Eight Bit
- Licensed by: AUS: Universal/Sony; NA: Sentai Filmworks
- Original network: AT-X, Tokyo MX, KBS, SUN, BS11
- Original run: October 5, 2014 – December 28, 2014
- Episodes: 13 + 6 specials
- Anime television film

The Labyrinth of Grisaia
- Directed by: Tensho
- Written by: Hideyuki Kurata
- Music by: Elements Garden
- Studio: Eight Bit
- Licensed by: AUS: Universal/Sony; NA: Sentai Filmworks
- Original network: AT-X, Tokyo MX, KBS, SUN, BS11
- Released: April 12, 2015
- Runtime: 47 minutes
- Anime television series

The Eden of Grisaia
- Directed by: Tensho
- Written by: Hideyuki Kurata
- Music by: Elements Garden
- Studio: Eight Bit
- Licensed by: AUS: Universal/Sony; NA: Sentai Filmworks
- Original network: AT-X, Tokyo MX, KBS, SUN, BS11
- Original run: April 19, 2015 – June 21, 2015
- Episodes: 10 + 5 specials
- Anime film

Grisaia: Phantom Trigger the Animation
- Directed by: Tensho
- Produced by: Ryuichiro Yamakawa
- Written by: Tensho
- Music by: Hitoshi Fujima; Fuminori Matsumoto
- Studio: Bibury Animation Studios
- Released: March 15, 2019
- Runtime: 90 minutes
- Anime film

Grisaia: Phantom Trigger the Animation Stargazer
- Directed by: Kousuke Murayama
- Produced by: Ryuichiro Yamakawa
- Written by: Tensho (series composition); Takashi Aoshima (screenplay)
- Music by: Hitoshi Fujima; Fuminori Matsumoto
- Studio: Bibury Animation Studios
- Released: November 27, 2020
- Runtime: 60 minutes
- Anime television series

Grisaia: Phantom Trigger the Animation
- Directed by: Kousuke Murayama
- Produced by: Kiyotaka Kobayashi; Hisato Usui; Yuusuke Oonuki; Manabu Jinguuji; Tatsuya Ueki; Takeshi Terui; Hiroyasu Oyama
- Written by: Tatsuya Takahashi
- Music by: Hitoshi Fujima; Yūsuke Takeda
- Studio: Bibury Animation Studios
- Licensed by: Crunchyroll
- Original network: Tokyo MX, BS NTV, SUN, TVA, HTB, SBS
- Original run: January 2, 2025 – March 27, 2025
- Episodes: 12

The Fruit of Grisaia (Japanese: グリザイアの果実, Hepburn: Gurizaia no Kajitsu) is a Japanese adult visual novel, the first in a series of visual novels by Frontwing, with character designs by Akio Watanabe and Fumio. It was released in February 2011 for Windows, and it was later ported to the PlayStation Portable and PlayStation Vita. Two sequel visual novels were also produced for Windows: The Labyrinth of Grisaia in February 2012 and The Eden of Grisaia in May 2013. The three games have been licensed in English and published worldwide by Sekai Project in 2015. There have been two manga adaptations published by Akita Shoten and Mag Garden. A 13-episode anime television series animated by Eight Bit and produced by NBCUniversal aired in Japan from October to December 2014. Subsequently, anime adaptations of the two sequel games aired between April and June 2015. An anime film adaptation of Grisaia: Phantom Trigger premiered on March 15, 2019. A sequel to the film titled Grisaia: Phantom Trigger the Animation Stargazer premiered on November 27, 2020. An anime television series adaptation of Grisaia: Phantom Trigger aired from January to March 2025.

== Gameplay ==
The Fruit of Grisaia is a romance visual novel in which the player assumes the role of Yūji Kazami. Throughout the game, the player encounters CG artwork at certain points in the story, which take the place of the background art and character sprites. The Fruit of Grisaia follows a branching plot line with multiple endings, and depending on the decisions that the player makes during the game, the plot will progress in a specific direction.

There are five main plot lines that the player will have the chance to experience, one for each heroine. Throughout gameplay, the player is given multiple options to choose from, and text progression pauses at these points until a choice is made. Some decisions can lead the game to end prematurely, which offer an alternative ending to the plot. To view all plot lines in their entirety, the player will have to replay the game multiple times and choose different choices to further the plot to an alternate direction. Throughout gameplay, there are scenes with sexual CGs depicting Yūji and a given heroine having sex.

== Plot ==
Yūji Kazami transfers to Mihama Academy, a school with only five female students and prison-like features. Every student in the school has their own "circumstances" for being there, but Yūji is not required to do anything about their situation as he asked for a normal student life. According to the decisions he makes while at Mihama Academy, however, he will eventually choose to become involved of his own accord.

== Characters ==
=== Main characters ===
Yūji Kazami (風見 雄二, Kazami Yūji)
Voiced by: Takahiro Sakurai (anime), Ayaka Suwa (child)
The protagonist of Grisaia. Ace number 9029, Yūji is a hit man working for a Japanese government agency, executing black ops missions. Tired of his aimless life, he wanted to live a normal school life. Cool, philosophical, and minimalist, Yūji is a realist with above average intelligence. Being very cautious, he always plans and scouts before action. Other than his occasional unorthodox military methods, he is just a fit young man. He disguises himself as an "exchange student from Canada". He seems to be very good at handling women which makes him very popular, shown by the fact that almost every female character seems to be attracted to him.

Yumiko Sakaki (榊 由美子, Sakaki Yumiko)
Voiced by: Ryōko Tanaka (PC, PSP & anime), credited as Hikaru Isshiki in the PC version
A second-year student of Mihama Academy, the daughter of "East Beach Railway Express Group" tycoon. Mihama Academy was established for her and she was the first student to enroll. Her defining feature is her waist-length black hair. Because of her bluntness and a hard-to-please personality, she often comes into conflict with the other characters. Due to her past, she tends to stay by herself and hardly tries to get along with others. She always carries a box cutter with her and uses it to threaten others, particularly Yūji, when she gets angry. She spends much of her free time reading, especially mystery novels, which has led the others to call her a bookworm. Although Yumiko typically acts as a lady, her favorite dishes are junk foods such as fried soba noodles. She later develops feelings for Yūji after he "saves" her from her family ties and depression making her more cheerful than before. She admits her feelings for Yūji quite later in the series unlike other girls who were honest from the start.

Amane Suou (周防 天音, Suō Amane)
Voiced by: Hiroko Taguchi (PC, PSP & anime), credited as Sora Yukimi in the PC version
A third-year student of Mihama Academy, the Onee-san type who always takes care of others. She is known as Makina's "mom". Due to her circumstances, she skipped a year of school at her previous school, so she is actually 2 years older than Yūji. She is tall and has a well-developed body with which she tries to seduce Yūji. Her family manages a long-established restaurant in Ginza, so she is good at cooking. Because of her mother is from Kyoto, whenever she gets excited, or when she panics, her speech takes on a Kansai dialect. She is deeply interested in cars and has acquired a motorcycle license. Amane also has a dirt bike which was remodeled to a cruiser called "Bobatarō" (ボバ太郎) and was put in the garage of the Academy. Amane develops feelings for Yūji out of the guilt that she left Yūji's sister back and ran away to save herself in the accident in which Yūji's sister was believed to be dead.

Michiru Matsushima (松嶋 みちる, Matsushima Michiru)
Voiced by: Kaori Mizuhashi (PC, PSP & anime), credited as Urara Hani in the PC version
A second-year student of Mihama Academy, Michiru is a fake tsundere with bleached blond twin tails and dissociative identity disorder. She has a deep interest in tsundere characters and tries to act like one. Her silly and energetic personality makes her the moodmaker of the class. Her grades are bad. She always carries a shark-shaped pouch with her which contains lemonade sweets. Despite having difficulty with sour foods, she still tries to drink 100% pure vitamin C in order to "improve her intelligence", as Michiru has said. She has encountered a lot of bad luck since her birth, but has always managed to get through in one way or another. Michiru also appears as the main character in the all-ages spin-off game titled Idol Mahō Shōjo Chiru Chiru Michiru. She develops feelings for Yūji after he gives her a new opportunity to relive her life.

Sachi Komine (小嶺 幸, Komine Sachi)
Voiced by: Ai Shimizu (PC, PSP & anime), credited as Mikasa Okamura in the PC version
A first-year student of Mihama Academy, Sachi is the maid of Mihama Academy. She always wears her maid outfit except when going to school, taking a bath or swimming. She does so because some people once told her to wear maid uniform as much as possible. Polite and with a strong sense of responsibility, there are only 3 words in her action dictionary, "receive", "confirm", and "execute". Because of this, she always tries to accomplish whatever has been asked of her, even if it was said as a joke, which has resulted in trouble. Her favorite animal is the shark and she made the shark-shaped pouch which Michiru carries around with her. She's also Yūji's childhood friend which Yūji remembers a bit later in the series. She falls in love with Yūji after he helps her get over her trauma which she had since childhood and was caused by her belief that she was the cause of her parents' death.

Makina Irisu (入巣 蒔菜, Irisu Makina)
Voiced by: Tomoe Tamiyasu (PC, PSP & anime)
A first-year student of Mihama Academy, Makina is an innocent and carefree girl with a hard to understand personality. In general, she can be explained in one word, "Fool", but sometimes her speech and behavior make people shed cold sweat. For those reasons, most of people who talk with her for five minutes will say "This girl is awful". She adores Yūji as a brother and Amane as a sister. She calls Yūji "Onii-chan". Although she has her own room in the dormitory, she always stays in Amane’s room. She always wears knee-socks with two different colors. Because of her parents' work, she stayed in foreign countries until she was six so she can speak English and other languages well. Her family is rumored to be a large financial clique which controls the underworld of Japan. People are unaware of the unhappiness which she suffered for being born in such a troublesome family. Makina used to be the successor of Irisu family but her inheritance was transferred to her younger sister, Irisu Sarina, after she suffered a mental shock in an accident. Despite all of that, she still has 70 million yen as her own property. She later uses that money to "buy" Yūji as her guardian/"papa". However after their little adventure in which she is almost assassinated she starts to develop feelings for him just like the other girls, although this is hinted at earlier in her arc when after "buying" him she kisses him saying it is a sign of affection.

=== Secondary characters ===
Chizuru Tachibana (橘 千鶴, Tachibana Chizuru)
Voiced by: Natsumi Yanase (PC, PSP & anime), credited as Izumi Maki in the PC version
The only daughter of a prefectural governor and the principal of Mihama Academy. Yūji saved her life, when she was taken as a hostage. Because of that, when Yūji told her that he wanted to have a normal school life, she offered him the chance to enroll to Mihama academy. Sometimes, she is mistaken for a junior school girl due to her young figure. She is about 30 and is still a virgin. She has a habit of speaking very quickly and stuttering when lying.

Yuria Harudera (春寺 由梨亜, Harudera Yuria; Julia Bardera; JB)
Voiced by: Erika Narumi (PC, PSP & anime), credited as Suzune Kusunoki in the PC version
Yūji's guardian and work boss. Her former name is Julia Bardera which is why Yūji calls her JB. She changed her name after moving to Japan. She is of mixed German and Italian descent. She has a yellow Ferrari. She is one of the few people aware of Yūji's past from the beginning as she was with Yūji's guardian and over the course of long time developed feelings for him. Although he seems to get irritated around her, Yūji is actually quite fond of her and is grateful to her for helping him out in many ways.

Kazuki Kazami (風見 一姫, Kazami Kazuki)
Voiced by: Akane Tomonaga (PC, PSP & anime), credited as Yukari Aoyama in the PC version
Yūji's elder sister. Despite her small stature, she has a genius-level intellect and an immense talent for art, which was exploited by her father as the main income of the household. Kazuki attended "Takizono Private Academy" with Amane and both of them were on the school basketball team. She 'died' in an accident which greatly influenced Yūji and Amane's future lives. Although she is Yūji's sister she has feelings for Yūji and has indulged in many incest relationships with him when they were younger such as taking intimate baths and sharing lip kisses. She was the only one who truly cared for and loved Yūji in her household which made her question every relation Yūji had with the outside world so as to protect him from any harm or ill activities and relationships with others.

Asako Kusakabe (日下部 麻子, Kusakabe Asako)
Voiced by: Kei Mizusawa (PC, PSP & anime), credited as Rino Kawashima in the PC version (Meikyū and Rakuen)
The woman whom Yūji called "Master". She took charge of raising Yūji after his parents died. Although quite older than Yūji and being his guardian she has indulged in sexual relationships with Yūji in the excuse of teaching him how to handle women. It was because of her influence that JB lost her virginity to Yūji. She had died one and a half years before Yūji enrolled to Mihama Academy. After her death, her friend, JB, became Yūji's guardian. Yūji once said "She had a rough personality". She is cremated and has her headstone in the mountains in Yamanashi Prefecture near where they used to live.

Michiaki Sakaki (榊 道昭, Sakaki Michiaki)
Voiced by: Kyōsuke Suzuki (PC), Matsuki Nobuhito (PSP), Eizo Tsuda (anime)
Yumiko's father, the leader of the "East Beach Electric Railway Group" financial zaibatsu and the chief director of Mihama Academy. He wanted Yumiko to return to his business firm and become the rightful heir although Yumiko was not interested in it. Yumiko with Yūji and his acquaintances played out an act which made Michiaki believe that Yumiko committed suicide.

Chiara Farrell (キアラ・ファレル, Kiara Fareru)
Voiced by: Chika Sakuragi (PC), Akane Tsukigase (PSP, anime)
A staff member of the information section of the "Company", JB's assistant and junior. She is very interested in Yūji. Apparently, she is two-thirds Japanese and one-third of African descent, hence her tanned complexion.

Kiyoka Irisu (入巣 きよか, Irisu Kiyoka)
The former head of Irisu clan and the main antagonist of Makina's route. Kiyoka is a part of a very corrupt and powerful family but her first truly evil act was having her daughter kidnapped and her husband murdered when he tried to save her. The murder happened right in front of her daughter (who she wanted disposed of as well). The reason she did this was because he was going to expose their corruption and she couldn't have that. The fact she cared so little about her husband or daughter and was going to replace her with a daughter she had during an affair showed her sociopathic nature right from the beginning. When asked about family, specifically about her mother, Makina told Yūji that her mother has hated her. When entering Makina's route, he learned that Kiyoka has given Makina a lifetime spending allowance of 70 million yen, to which she decided to spend on buying Yūji to become her father. Realising that her mother has never raised Makina properly, Yūji reluctantly accepted the money, as well as wholeheartedly accepted his new role as Makina's father-figure. When Irisu clan's main branch learned of Makina's survival of the kidnapping, they sabotaged Makina's half sister, Irisu Sarina, who is the current heir of the Irisu clan. The intent behind the sabotage is to bring Makina back as the heir, so they can maintain their power within the clan. Kiyoka claimed that it doesn't matter to her which of her daughters will succeed as the heir of the clan. However, it is strongly hinted that Kiyoka, wary of Makina's recent part-time job, had ordered the branch family to stalk Makina and/or sabotage the bakery if necessary, despite the young girl being strongly opposed to the idea of going back to the family.

Sarina Irisu (入巣 サリーナ, Irisu Sarina)
The current heir of the Irisu clan. She is a daughter of Kiyoka and a half-sister of Makina. She replaced Makina as the true heir of Irisu clan after Makina's father, Masataka Irisu, attempt to exposed the Irisu clan's fraud; During Makina's route, she was caught in an explosion incident. Though she survived, she came out with severe injuries. She does not make an appearance in other route. One could assumed that nothing major happened to her, and that she eventually placed as the clan's head later in her life; during Makina's afterstory, Kiyoka mentioned that Sarina recovery has been proceeding very well.

Masataka Irisu (入巣 正孝, Irisu Masataka)
Makina & Sarina's father and the adopted son of the Irisu house. Masataka is a man of a good nature. He's a caring and loving man, as well as possesses a strong sense of justice, but is somewhat naive. He's the only family member in Makina's childhood who truly loved and wanted to protect her; as a result, his daughter developed a very deep emotional bond to paternal love. After learning of the Irisu's shadow background, he made an attempt to push the clan into a better direction, after all of the attempts that failed, he decided to expose all the misdeeds that the Irisu clan had done over the years to the public, and taking Makina with him. In an attempt to protect the clan secret, the family had organised a kidnapping of Makina in an attempt to lure Masataka out. Due to his love for his daughter, as well as his naive personality, Masataka complies to the deal without objection. In front of his beloved daughter, he was shot multiple time and left to die, with his daughter forced to watch his corpse rot for six days; Masataka's death deeply hurt Makina, as she had stated continuously having nightmare about that day. After her recovery, she became desperate for a paternal love and actively seeking for a father figure. It was also revealed that she made her Tanabata wish based on the promise with her father, which was never fulfilled.

Satoko Kazami (風見 知子, Kazami Kazuki)
Voiced by: Tomoe Tamiyasu
Yūji and Kazuki's weak willed mother, who constantly suffered the verbal and physical abuse of her husband Ryouji. When Kazuki was still around she just ignored both her son in order to not get into trouble, but after Kazuki was gone and the domestic abuse from her husband worsened, she and her only son left their house and lived in peace for about a year, only for Ryouji to track them down and tried to rape her in front of Yūji. When Yūji killed his father, she told Yūji to wait at the train station, while she re-staged the crime scene to make it look like she killed him, then hung herself.

Ryouji Kazami (風見 涼二, Kazami Ryouji)
Voiced by: Gō Fujii
Yūji & Kazuki's father and the former husband of Satoko until they divorced. He had an interest in art and was an antique dealer. After Kazuki's "death", Yūji and his mother, Satoko, ran away from him as he had become an alcoholic and physically abused them. But one year later, he succeeded in finding them afterwards and attempts to rape his wife in front of Yūji, which leads Yūji to kill him in the process. Ryouji Kazami was born as a second son of a farmer in Chiba. By the time of his birth, his parents had already pass away. He was said to have a terrible judgement, which cost him greatly in his adulthood. He has a major in art history at a university. While he inherit a plot of land from his father, he was coaxed into selling the land to build a resort condominium. However, the business failed, and he was forced to sell of the newly built resort to recoup his debt. The debt eventually inflated into a 32 million yen, which he kept hidden from his family. He obtained a one-time settlement of 4.2 million yen by picking a fight with his elder brother, and become estranged from the family as a result. Ryouji use the money he obtained from the settlement to open an antique art store, which he used to arrange shady but technically legal deals to corrupt politicians. He met Satoko when a yakuza and regular customer, presumably one of his client, brought him to her club. One day while working at his store, he found his daughter Kazuki sketching a random painting in the store. However, on closer inspection, the detail in the sketching looks very much like the real painting. Out of the whim, he decided to let Kazuki play with a canvas and oil paints. Due to her talent as an artist, Ryouji regarded Kazuki as a genius. However, as for Yūji, who does not possess his sister’s talent, he regards his son as a disappointment and a complete failure constantly comparing him as an inferior child to Kazuki's skills as a genius.

Megumi Komori (小森 めぐみ, Komori Megumi)
A first year student of Takizono Private Academy and a member of the basketball team who was one of the victims that was killed during the disaster days after a bus accident. She has navy blue hair worn in two twin tails.

Haruna Ibuki (澪田 春奈, Ibuki Haruna)
A member of the basketball club and one of the victims who were killed in the days of disaster after a bus accident. After discovering her best friend was fatally-stabbed by Chiaki Sakashita, she snapped and attempted to kill Chiaki with a pair of scissors before a panicked Yoshihiko Ochi smashed a rock to Haruna's skull, killing her. She has short dark green hair.

Chiaki Sakashita (坂下千秋, Sakashita Chiaki)
A third year student at Takizono Private Academy who served as the director of the basketball club. She comes from a wealthy family; due to her coercive personality, she wasn't trusted much by other members. She was the first to witness the acts of cannibalism Yoshihiko committed. It is unknown how long she survived after her confrontation with Kazuki Kazami and Amane Suou when she was discovered having sex with the teacher Yoshihiko Ochi after going insane . She was bed-ridden after her injury caused by a fellow student; she and some of the remaining students died of an infection caused by consumption of disease-stricken human flesh; Hinted by a fellow classmate, she would have sex with Yoshihiko as her way of forgiving him of the heinous acts of cannibalism. It is implied she was weak-willed and arrogant because of her easily forgiving nature and her numerous arguments with her friend Kazuki. She has short light brown hair.

Yoshihiko Ochi (越智 善彦, Ochi Yoshihiko)
A young male teacher who served as the adviser of the basketball club. Later pursuing delirium-fueled sexual relations with Chiaki Sakashita.

Saaya Kaneda (金田 サヤ, Kaneda Saaya)
A member of the basketball club and one of the victims who was dead during the disaster days after the bus accident. She has red hair styled in a bob cut.

Mifuyu Sakurai (櫻井 みふゆ, Sakurai Mifuyu)
A member of the basketball team and one of the victims who was dead during the disaster days after the bus accident. She has lavender purple hair.

Minori Sakuma (さくま ミノリ, Sakuma Minori)
A third year student and a member of the basketball team and one of the victims who was dead in the disaster days after a bus accident. When they started the basketball team, Minori was offered team captain position but she turned it down and the position was given to Chiaki instead. She has neck length black hair

Tamaki Hirooka (ヒロカ タマキ, Hirooka Tamaki)
A first year student and another member of the basketball team. She was one of the victims who was dead during the disaster days after the bus accident. She has short chocolate cherry hair.

Ritsu Koide (小出 律, Koide Ritsu)
Another member of the basketball team and one of the victims who was found dead during the disaster days after the bus accident. Even though her parents are doctors, she doesn't know anything about the medical treatment.

Sachi's Father
Sachi's father. He worked together with his unnamed wife at the backstreet workshop. After realizing Sachi was lonely for the past years, he and his wife decided to make it up for Sachi on her birthday by transforming their workshop into a mural full of pictures dedicated to her. As he and Sachi's mother were about to make amends with their daughter, both parents were hit by a drunk driver in a truck after chasing Sachi, who ran out of the house after an argument between the three of them. This accident instantly killed Sachi's father and put her mother into a vegetative state/coma.

Sachi's Mother
Sachi's mother. She worked together with her unnamed husband at the backstreet workshop. After realizing that her daughter, Sachi, was lonely for the past few years, she and her husband decided to make amends to her. As she was about to reunite with her daughter however, she was hit by a drunk driver in a truck alongside Sachi's father. She was placed into a vegetative state/coma for years to come whereas her father was instantly killed.

=== Phantom Trigger characters ===
Rena Fukami (深見 玲奈, Fukami Rena)
Voiced by: Maaya Uchida (Japanese); Britney Karbowski (English)
A gunwoman from the Hollow House owned by Haruto who is charged to shoot things on his behalf, as well as a student at Mihama Academy. Sports an athletic build and a complex towards her owner Haruto. Her weapons of choice include the Ignis and Omen, both M1911-style pistols, a Taurus Judge and an AR-15-style rifle named the Lucanus (known as the Regius in the Japanese narration).
Tohka Shishigaya (獅子ヶ谷 桐花, Shishigaya Tōka)
Voiced by: Ayane Sakura (Japanese); Sarah Wiedenheft (English)
A student of Mihama Academy with American roots specializing as a sniper. Noted for her short stature and sharp tongue causing her to butt heads with practically anyone, particularly Rena. Her weapons of choice are a Remington Model 700, Heckler & Koch HK417D and a Smith & Wesson SD.
Christina Sakurako Kujirase (鯨瀬・クリスチィナ・桜子, Kujirase Kurisutina Sakurako)
Voiced by: Kaori Nazuka (Japanese); Suzie Yeung (English)
A student at Mihama Academy with British roots; she is a computer and explosives specialist. She excels academically and is noted for her excellent cooking. She is armed with a Smith & Wesson Bodyguard 380, but generally dislikes carrying it into battle. She is known as "Chris" to her peers.
Murasaki Ikoma (狗駒 邑沙季, Ikoma Murasaki)
Voiced by: Atsumi Tanezaki (Japanese); Lauren Conn (English)
A student at Mihama Academy who specializes in disguise and stealth operations. She is noted for her eccentricities and wears a pair of Reeboks as opposed to flat shoes. Her weapons of choice are a Gemtech Oasis Ruger Mark III and a Heckler & Koch MP7A1.
Maki Inohara (井ノ原 真紀, Inohara Maki)
Voiced by: Yoshino Nanjō (Japanese); Michelle Rojas (English)
A student at Mihama Academy as well as an assassin from the Hollow House along with Rena, whom the latter treats like her younger sister due to their childhoods. Sports an athletic build, generally unrivaled strength and a belligerent attitude, especially when Haruto is mentioned. Formerly owned by a Russian crime syndicate before she was taken in by Haruto on the request of Rena. Her weapons of choice are four Glock 26s aptly named Eenie, Meenie, Miney and Mo and a sawn-off Remington Model 870 named the Dragon-12.
Shiori Arisaka (有坂 秋桜里, Arisaka Shiori)
Voiced by: Mikako Izawa (Japanese); Kate Bristol (English)
A newly-employed teacher at Mihama Academy. Carries a notepad around to record notes and apologizes a lot. Is extremely timid and gets scared by even the slightest things.
Haruto Aoi (蒼井 春人, Aoi Haruto)
Voiced by: Tsubasa Yonaga (Japanese); Howard Wang (English)
Rena and Maki's owner who is both a student and instructor at Mihama Academy. He is noted for his androgynous figure, with numerous people confusing him for a lady; this appearance is explained later as he was apparently an experiment created by Ichiru, combining the DNA of two people who are heavily implied to be Yūji and Asako from the original novel line. He claims to be a poor shot, hence why he carries a katana-like longsword into firefights.
Ichiru Sengoku (仙石 一縷, Sengoku Ichiru)
Voiced by: Toa Yukinari (Japanese); Elizabeth Maxwell (English)
Headmaster of Mihama Academy noted for her casual manner of speech and her habit of smoking cigarettes. Former member of the previous generation of Phantom Triggers, specializing as a medic. A member of the highly affluent and influential Sengoku family.
Nogami Himeko (姫子 野上, Himeko Nogami)
Voiced by: Tomoe Ohmi (Japanese); Molly Searcy (English)
Ichiru's personal assistant. Often disapproves of Ichiru's and the other girls' antics. Former member of the previous generation of Phantom Triggers who specialized in close combat and martial arts.
Izumi Yamamoto (山本 イヅミ, Yamamoto Izumi)
Voiced by: Haruka Kitagaito (Japanese); Tia Ballard (English)
Master gunsmith handling all of the guns for the Phantom Triggers. Speaks with a heavy Kansai drawl. Rena affectionately nicknames her "Mocchan".
Choco & Vanilla Inagaki (稲垣 チョコ, 稲垣 バニラ, Inagaki Choko, Inagaki Banira)
Voiced by: Sarah Emi Bridcutt (Japanese); Kristi Rothrock (Choco), Emily Bauer (Vanilla) (English)
Twins hailing from Alaska who are members of SORD's other campus.
Chihiro Ukawa (宇川 千尋, Ukawa Chihiro)
Voiced by: Sho Sudo (Japanese); Daman Mills (English)
Choco and Vanilla's handler. Speaks in a laid-back tone and calls Haruto "Junior". Former member of the previous generation of Phantom Triggers.
Megumi Kumashiro (九真城 恵, Kumashiro Megumi)
Voiced by: Suzuko Mimori
A transfer student from St. Aile's International, a sister school to Mihama Academy with a religious theme; she is currently under the care of Tohka. Speaks in an extremely formal tone and is noted for her big appetite. She specializes as a sniper, with her weapons of choice being a Blaser R93 Tactical, Steyr AUG and a SIG Sauer P226. Nicknamed "Gumi" by most of her classmates; Maki gives her the rather unpleasant nickname of "Sgt. Gummer".
Taiga Sengoku (仙石 大雅, Sengoku Taiga)
Voiced by: Natsumi Takamori
First cousin of Ichiru and member of the highly influential Sengoku family. Despite her short stature, she is quick witted, highly intelligent and can be curt at times. She is currently under the care of Chris, working as a medic for the team. Her weapon of choice is an FN Five-seven.
Yūki Ikoma (狗駒 悠希, Ikoma Yūki)
Voiced by: Mikoi Sasaki
Older sister of Murasaki. Member of the previous generation of Phantom Triggers. Often noted for her ever-changing personality, with different personalities and "memories" each time she meets someone. Her weapons of choice include a Bulgarian Makarov and an AKS-74U.
Sylvia Hartnett (シルビア・ハートネット, Shirubia Hātonetto)
Voiced by: Juri Nagatsuma
An upperclassman part of St. Aile's International's SORD team. Speaks in an extremely refined tone and has always been seen with her eyes closed. Works together with Velvet in missions and both are rarely ever seen apart.
Velvet Kasai (ベルベット・カサイ, Berubetto Kasai)
Voiced by: Chiaki Omigawa
A Japanese American upperclassman part of St. Aile's International's SORD team. Nicknamed "Vel", she is extremely hot-blooded and speaks in an uncouth manner equivalent to that of a gangster when provoked. Works together with Sylvia in missions and both are rarely ever seen apart.
Ayame Sengoku (仙石 綾芽, Sengoku Ayame)
Voiced by: Naoto Kobayashi
Sylvia and Velvet's handler, younger brother of Ichiru and member of the highly influential Sengoku family. Former member of the previous generation of Phantom Triggers. He noticeably gains a pot belly after retiring from active duty and becomes a recluse, rarely showing his face in public. Noted for being brash and loud-mouthed, arguably even more so than his sister.
Aoi Aoi (蒼井 蒼, Aoī Aoi)
Voiced by: Ami Koshimizu
A hot-blooded former member of the previous generation of Phantom Triggers, serving as reserve student and a gunman from Hollow House, serving Ichiru. She was highly regarded as one of the best shooters of her day, as well as one of the most dangerous Hollow assassins. She died before the events of Volume 1, with her backstory explained in a later volume. It is due to her death that Ichiru uses smoking as a coping mechanism to deal with her death as the former smoked quite often herself. Her weapon of choice, prior to her death, was a Smith & Wesson Model 629; the weapon is currently in the possession of Yamamoto.
Enishi Urushihara (漆原 縁, Urushihara Enishi)
Voiced by: Kenji Hamada
Former member of the previous generation of Phantom Triggers, serving as the team's instructor and handler. He is regarded as one of Haruto's only, if not the only, father figure he has had. He has since defected from the organization to serve for a crime syndicate.
Kuroe Samejima (鮫島 黒江, Samejima Kuroe)
Voiced by: Ai Kakuma
Former member of the previous generation of Phantom Triggers, serving as Enishi's personal bodyguard and assistant. Noted as being a former member of Hollow House, having graduated in the same batch as Aoi; she is noted as being extremely quiet and reserved. She has since defected from the organization to serve for a crime syndicate along with her master.

== Release history ==
The game was first released for Windows on February 25, 2011. A PlayStation Portable version was released on February 21, 2013. The PSP version removes explicit sex scenes, but adds a new story, updated graphics, and additional voices. An upgraded PlayStation Vita version was released in August 2013 in Japan. Two sequels were released for Windows: The Labyrinth of Grisaia (グリザイアの迷宮, Gurizaia no Meikyū) released on February 24, 2012, and The Eden of Grisaia (グリザイアの楽園, Gurizaia no Rakuen) released on May 24, 2013. A spin-off parody game of Grisaia no Kajitsu, titled Grisaia no Kajitsu Spin-out!? Idol Magical Girl Chiruchiru Michiru (グリザイアの果実スピンアウト!? アイドル魔法少女ちるちる☆みちる, Grisaia no Kajitsu Supinauto!? Aidoru Mahō Shōjo Chiruchiru Michiru), was released for Windows in 2014 (part one released in August, and part two in December). It was ported to the PlayStation Vita on June 25, 2015, and features an original story on how Michiru becomes a magical girl tasked with the job of saving the world. Sekai Project acquired the rights to release an English version of the Grisaia trilogy as well as the spinoff game Idol Magical Girl Chiruchiru Michiru which they funded via Kickstarter in December 2014. An English port of the PlayStation Vita version of The Fruit of Grisaia was released on Steam on May 29, 2015. A collection named The Grisaia Trilogy containing the three main entries and side stories was released for the Nintendo Switch in November 2019.

== Related media ==
=== Manga ===
A manga adaptation titled The Fruit of Grisaia: Sanctuary Fellows (グリザイアの果実 サンクチュアリ フェローズ, Grisaia no Kajitsu: Sankuchuari Ferōzu), written by Eiji Narumi and illustrated by Shū Hirose, began serialization in Akita Shoten's Champion Red Ichigo magazine with volume 36 released on February 5, 2013. The first tankōbon volume was released on December 20, 2013; four volumes have been released. A second manga titled The Fruit of Grisaia: L'Oiseau bleu (グリザイアの果実 〜L'Oiseau bleu〜), written by Jun'ichi Fujisaku and illustrated by Taka Himeno, was serialized in Mag Garden's Monthly Comic Blade magazine between the May and September 2014 issues. Following the magazine's discontinuation, the manga continued serialization in Mag Garden's Comic Garden magazine with the October 2014 issue. The first tankōbon volume was released on September 10, 2014 and the third and last on December 10, 2015.

=== Anime ===
A 13-episode anime television series adaptation, animated by Eight Bit, produced by NBCUniversal, and directed by Tenshi, with screenplay by Hideyuki Kurata, character designs and chief animation direction by Akio Watanabe, and music composed by Elements Garden, aired from October 5 to December 28, 2014, on AT-X. Six anime shorts were released with the DVD and Blu-ray Disc compilation volumes released between December 25, 2014, and May 27, 2015. Sequentially, two follow-ups with a 47-minute anime television film adaptation of The Labyrinth of Grisaia aired on April 12, 2015, and a 10-episode anime adaptation of The Eden of Grisaia aired from April 19 to June 21, 2015. All 3 series have been licensed for digital and home video release by Sentai Filmworks in North America.

A 90-minute anime film adaptation based on Frontwing's Grisaia: Phantom Trigger episodic game series premiered on March 15, 2019. The film, which adapts the first 2 volumes of the game, was directed by Tensho at Bibury Animation Studios, with Akio Watanabe handling character designs and Ryuichiro Yamakawa handling production. Hitoshi Fujima and Fuminori Matsumoto are composing the music. The cast members reprised their roles from the game. Sequentially, a sequel to Grisaia: Phantom Trigger premiered on November 27, 2020. Titled Grisaia: Phantom Trigger the Animation - Stargazer, it adapts Volume 3 of the game, with the cast and staff reprising their roles from the first film.

A new anime television series adaptation based on Grisaia: Phantom Trigger was announced, with Bibury Animation Studios returning from the game's film adaptations to produce the series. It is directed by Kousuke Murayama, with character designs and chief animation direction by Akio Watanabe, and music composed by Hitoshi Fujima, Yūsuke Takeda, and Fuminori Matsumoto. The series, originally scheduled for 2024, was later delayed, and eventually aired from January 2 to March 27, 2025, on Tokyo MX and other networks. (Note: Tokyo MX lists the series premiere on January 1, 2025, at 25:00, which is effectively January 2 at 1:00 a.m. JST.) Crunchyroll streams the series.

=== Music ===
The Fruit of Grisaia has six pieces of theme music: one opening theme and five ending themes. The opening theme is "Shūmatsu no Fractal" (終末のフラクタル; "Fractal of the End") by Faylan. Each heroine has her own ending theme, starting with Yumiko's theme "Holograph" (ホログラフ) by Eufonius. Amane's theme is "Home" by Miyuki Hashimoto. Michiru's theme is "Skip" by Chata. Makina's theme is "Mayoi no Mori" (迷いの森; "Lost Forest") by Hiromi Satō. Sachi's theme is "Kono Hi no Mama de" (この日のままで) by Nana. The single for "Shūmatsu no Fractal", which also contains "Happy Soul Dance", was released on January 26, 2011.

The opening theme song is "Rakuen no Tsubasa" (楽園の翼; "Wing of Paradise"), performed by Maon Kurosaki, and the main ending theme song is "Anata no Aishita Sekai" (あなたの愛した世界; "The World That You Loved"), performed by Yoshino Nanjō. Additional ending theme songs include "Eden's Song" by Hana used in Episode 2; "Skip" used in Episode 5; and "Sōsei no Tanatosu" (創世のタナトス; "Thanatos of the Genesis"), performed by Faylan, used in Episode 13. Several ending themes from the game included as insert songs are also used in the anime such as "Holograph" in Episode 6, and "Lost Forest" in Episode 9. The opening theme song for The Eden of Grisaia is "Setsuna no Kajitsu" (刹那の果実), performed by Maon Kurosaki.

For the Grisaia: Phantom Trigger television series, the opening theme song is "Zero Ignition" performed by Mao Uesugi, while the ending theme song is "Dandelion" performed by Yoshino Nanjō.

== Reception ==
Reception

Review score
Publication	Score
Famitsu	8/10, 8/10, 7/10, 7/10

In the 2011 Moe Game Awards, The Fruit of Grisaia was awarded the Grand Prize, as well as the Gold Prizes for Scenario, User's Choice, Theme Song, and True Love. The judges highly praised the story for its balancing of seriousness with comedy. The PlayStation Portable version sold 3,700 units in the first week, making it the second best-selling PSP title in Japan that week.

Operation Rainfall rated The Fruit of Grisaia a score of 5/5, with reviewer Chris Melchin writing that "[if you] like visual novels and romance, I see no reason not to check out The Fruit of Grisaia if you haven’t already."
