= GotoP =

Japanese artist

GotoP (ごとP, Goto Pī, born June 12, 1969) is a male Japanese artist from Gifu Prefecture, Gifu, Japan, currently living in Saitama. He did the original character design for Wandaba Style and Close to: Inori no Oka, two visual novels. He is also notable for the illustration of the Official Another Story Clannad short story collection based on the visual novel Clannad.

== Works ==
=== Artbooks ===
- Nagomi Biyori (なごみ日和) (Media Works) - ISBN 4840225923
- Hidamari - GotoP Artworks (ひだまり-ごとPアートワークス) (Media Works) - ISBN 4840212899
- Moegi Iro (もえぎいろ)

=== Illustrations ===
- Angel Beats! -Track Zero- (monthly illustration of stories for related series at Dengeki G's Magazine)
- CLANNAD Official Another Story Hikari Mimamoru Sakamichi de (Media Works) - ISBN 4840232504

=== Original character design ===
==== Anime ====
- Wandaba Style

==== Video games ====
- Clannad: Hikari Mimamoru Sakamichi de - 2010
- Close to ~Inori no Oka~ - 2001
- D.C. II ~Da Capo II~ (Harimao's design) - 2006
- Narcissu: Side 2nd - 2007
- Tsugi no Giseisha wo Oshirase Shimasu - 2011
