= Sakura Spirit =

2014 visual novel

- Developer: Winged Cloud
- Publisher: Sekai Project
- Engine: Ren'Py
- Platforms: Windows, OS X, Linux, Nintendo Switch
- Release: 9 July 2014
- Genre: Visual novel
- Mode: Single-player

Sakura Spirit is a 2014 visual novel video game for personal computers developed by American indie studio Winged Cloud and published by Sekai Project. At the time of its release it was considered one of few visual novels that are developed outside Japan and aimed at the English-speaking market, and is also one of the first projects published by Sekai Project that is not a translation of a Japanese visual novel, but rather an original English language work. The game was released on 9 July 2014 on Steam and MangaGamer.

The game is a visual novel where the player reads text on the screen combined with anime-styled artwork. However, unlike some other visual novels, Sakura Spirit does not allow the player to make selections (except for one at the end), which normally allows the visual novel's plot to progress in the direction of the player's choice. The game was the first of the Sakura series and was followed up by Sakura Angels.

== Plot ==
Sakura Spirit gameplay screenshot

Sakura Spirit follows the story of Gushiken Takahiro, a 17-year-old boy who aspires to become the #1 judo contender to represent Japan. After growing up to be a standout, soon he is a few weeks before a tournament giving him the chance to represent Japan. Becoming nervous, Takahiro follows advice from his friends and finds a temple hidden in the woods rumoured to contain spiritual power. After he begins to pray for good luck in his upcoming match, he meets a spirit telling him that he is to play a vital part to the road ahead to improving himself as a warrior, and is transported to a different world, where he runs into several different fox girls. Takahiro soon realizes that he has been sent back to feudal Japan, that is also populated by spirits.

Takahiro soon learns that the fox girls are not trusted by the humans in the village, as a result of a dispute between the humans and the girls. The game's plot focuses on Takahiro helping to bridge the divide between the humans and the spirits, while spending some personal time with the girls and trying to find his way back home.

== Release and reception ==
Sakura Spirit was released on July 9, 2014. By 2015, Sakura Spirit was one of the games that is banned from being streamed on Twitch as it does not meet their content guidelines. The game was later released for the Nintendo Switch on June 23, 2022.

Bradly Storm of Hardcore Gamer wrote that "the problem with Sakura Spirit is not necessarily that it's a niche of a niche [...] It lacks narrative depth and compelling characters, and while its humor will be good for a few laughs, comedy without any type of golden thread to tie it altogether ultimately comes off as a disjointed project that plays more like a series of jokes than a coherent piece of storytelling. Its reliance on overused tropes can be eye-rolling for those familiar with the genre and its nice presentation can only make up for so much. Simply put, there are better visual novels out there." A reviewer on the Japanese website 4gamer.net was surprised to see as Western studio develop a galge and found they felt the developers had thoroughly studied Japanese anime and video games that feature cute girls and that art style in the game were of high quality and would appeal to Japanese tastes. They found the main story as sloppy and was disappointed by their being a lack of choices in the gameplay.

Cravis Bruno of Capsule Computers reviewed Sakura Spirit positively, writing "Sakura Spirit is a fun, albeit short, visual novel that takes a well-used storyline and makes it more enjoyable by putting its own spin on things and presenting players with a likable cast of girls. With plenty of humor and some very extremely suggestive dialogue at times, Sakura Spirit does have its faults but those faults only put a mild damper over an entertaining visual novel" and rating it a 7/10. The game's artwork and audio were praised, however, he found issues with spelling mistakes in the game's text and Sakura Spirit's inability for the player to influence the plot.

Jerimiah Mueller of TechnologyTell reviewed the game negatively, finding fault in its story, artwork, and gameplay choices, summarizing that "players get a bunch of pre-teen fantasies haphazardly strung together, featuring a cast of Baywatch rejects in cosplay [...] I have no choice but to outright fail Sakura Spirit", for a rating of "F". Brittany Vincent of Destructoid criticised the game's perceived juvenile plot and lack of central direction, finding it to be "pretty to look at, but utterly devoid of any redeeming value", awarding it a low score of 3/10.

== Further installments ==
A follow-up visual novel, titled Sakura Angels, was released in January 2015. Pitched as an "angelic love comedy", the game's plot has two girls, blessed with magical powers, tasked with saving the protagonist from the clutches of a mysterious witch and ancient evil. An update adding Japanese voice acting for the game was released on 8 September 2015.

A second follow-up, titled Sakura Fantasy, was later released in May 2015. Unlike the two previous Sakura games, Sakura Fantasy features a female protagonist and is also released in multiple chapters. Sakura Fantasy Chapter 1 was initially released as an all ages title on Steam. Two optional patches were later released that added adult content to the game. The first patch uncensored some of the existing CGs, making them more explicit. The second patch included the uncensored CGs from the first patch, and also added several new yuri sex scenes, with new CGs to accompany them. Sakura Fantasy Chapter 2 was originally planned to release in July 2015, but has since entered development hell.
