= Fault Milestone One =

2013 video game

- Cover art, featuring the characters Ritona (left) and Selphine (right)
- Developer: Alice in Dissonance
- Publisher: Sekai Project: JP: Alice in Dissonance
- Director: Munisix
- Artist: Hare Konatsu
- Writer: Munisix
- Composer: Luiza Carvalho
- Engine: Ren'Py (PC); Unity (consoles)
- Platforms: Windows, OS X, Linux, Nintendo Switch, PlayStation 4
- Release: Windows, OS X, Linux: JP: August 12, 2013; WW: December 15, 2014; Nintendo Switch: WW: October 3, 2019; PlayStation 4: WW: May 22, 2020
- Genre: Visual novel
- Mode: Single-player

Fault Milestone One is a visual novel video game developed by Alice in Dissonance and published by Sekai Project. It was first released in Japan for Windows, OS X, and Linux in 2013, with an English version localized and released by Sekai Project the following year. Versions for the Nintendo Switch and PlayStation 4 were later released in 2020.

Fault Milestone One follows the royal guardian Ritona, who uses magic to escape the kingdom of Rughzenhaide, along with princess Selphine, after it gets attacked by mercenaries. The two arrive in a strange country unfamiliar to them halfway across the world, and follows their attempt to return home. It is the first entry in the Fault series, and was followed by Fault Milestone Two in 2015. Considered a "kinetic novel", the game is mostly linear and features minimal gameplay interaction.

The game was directed and written by Munisix, with artwork by Hare Konatsu. The story was initially based on a pitch for a role-playing game delivered to Munisix; being underwhelmed with it, he reworked it until it according to him no longer resembled the original idea. When Alice in Dissonance were approached by Sekai Project about an English localization, they wanted to add some polish first. They financed the localization, as well as ports for other platforms through a crowdfunding campaign in 2014. The game was a commercial success and received positive reviews from critics.

== Overview ==
Fault Milestone One is a linear visual novel with no player interaction aside from one player decision early in the game that affects some dialogue. The game focuses on telling a story, with the player being an observer. The player has access to an in-game encyclopedia detailing concepts seen in the game. The game is set in a world where the art of using magic, called "manakravte", exists and is used in almost every aspect of life. However, not everywhere on the planet has high concentration of mana. These places, called the "Outer-Pole", have instead had advances in science and medicine. The story follows the manakravter Ritona, the royal guardian for princess Selphine of the kingdom of Rughzenhaide. Among other characters are Rune, a girl from the Outer-Pole, and her brother Rudo, the head of a major company.

== Development ==
Fault Milestone One was developed by Alice in Dissonance as the first work under Project Written, the name of their operations. It was directed and written by Munisix, with character designs and other art by Hare Konatsu. The "Milestone" in the title comes from how Alice in Dissonance wanted to do something different from the commonly used word "Episode"; as the story is about a journey, they found "Milestone" thematically fitting. While Munisix is a native speaker of English, he chose to write the game in Japanese, stating that his reason for this was that he had had more exposure to the visual novel medium in Japanese than in English, also saying that he would have used English if he were to write a movie script. According to him, the writing is the aspect that takes the most time during the production, with a lot of time spent on coming up with ideas and turning them into "something consistent". Describing himself as a disorganized person, he has said that they have had to delete whole segments due to him overlooking some aspect of the game's world.

The game's story originally began as a pitch for a role-playing game that was delivered to Munisix at some point in the 2000s. It included the premise of a princess defeating an enemy that had devastated her homeland, as well as character names and personalities, and asked Munisix to write a story. Munisix found the pitch underwhelming, but still worked on it, attempting to make it more interesting; while he was working on it, the person who had delivered the pitch stopped contacting him. Not wanting to abandon the work he had put into the project, Munisix continued with the project, making several changes to the point where it no longer resembled the original pitch. Among these were additions to the game world and cast, including the creation of Ritona and the Outer and Inner-Poles, the concept of the "path down", and a motivation for the game's antagonist. He also changed the structure of the story so that it could work as a manga or as "a better game than it was intended to be".

Munisix wrote the main characters to be strong women who can "more than adequately do" what male characters from shōnen manga can, intending for both male and female players to be able to look up to them. He did not consider the characters' sexual or affectionate attractiveness to be a primary goal, and intended for them to be "gritty and cool" rather than "cute and lovely". He based Rune's condition on psychopathy. He aimed to give each part of the game world its own feeling: Rughzenhaide and the Alliance were made similar to the Age of Enlightenment, but with an information technology (IT) revolution that did not require computers. According to Munisix, the names of characters and locations came about naturally, with no time spent on any naming scheme. He tried to write slice-of-life scenes for the game, but felt that they were not compelling or convincing, stating that the tense situations the main characters are in throughout the story leave little room for levity, as they need to get home alive and constantly have to consider potential dangers.

For the game's character design, Munisix initially gave Konatsu specifications of what each character would look like; as they kept working on the Fault series, they "found a rhythm", with Konatsu designing the characters according to their personality and function. They go through multiple prototypes, with some designs turning into other characters, and some clothes being reused on other characters. Due to misunderstandings, Konatsu initially designed Rune as a male character. Munisix had imagined Rune as looking "girly", wearing a skirt and having long, black hair. However, when Konatsu redid the design, elements of the original male design remained, with Rune being given pigtails and pants, which Munisix later said that he preferred over his original concept. Some locations that did not exist in the original draft, such as the Zhevitz family manor, were added to the story late during the game's production when Alice in Dissonance was low on money. Because of this, they had to resort to using stock background images.

== Release and localization ==
The game was originally released in Japan on August 12, 2013. The English video game publisher Sekai Project found out about it while looking for new groups in the Japanese video game market by reading Japanese news sites focusing on doujin games, and found Fault Milestone One to stand out from the rest. They contacted Alice in Dissonance and organized a meeting in Tokyo, where they discussed the licenses that would be needed to publish the game in the West; the only one required was for the music. As Alice in Dissonance felt that the game required some more polish before getting an international release, they decided to finance development of improved character sprites, new cutscenes and an English translation through the crowdfunding platform Kickstarter.

Sekai Project launched the campaign in June 2014, with the goal to raise $5,000 by July 18; by the end of the campaign, they had managed to raise US$34,662, allowing for the production of Android and PlayStation Vita ports, an artbook, and the prequel game Fault: Silence the Pedant. Originally, Munisix had planned to handle the localization himself, but due to the success of the crowdfunding campaign he was instead able to focus on developing the sequel Fault Milestone Two. By December 2014, the English translation was finished, with Sekai Project working on finishing the production. The director's cut version was released in Japan on August 17, 2014, and internationally in both English and Japanese on December 15, 2014. In July 2016, the game was updated with a new English translation intended to be "100% faithful" to the Japanese version of the game, and more consistent in tone with Fault Milestone Two due to them sharing the same translator.

While Sekai Project had initially begun work on porting the game to the Unity game engine themselves in order to release the game on the PlayStation Vita, they announced in February 2016 that they had instead decided to contract an outside company to do the PlayStation Vita port. The game was also released for the Nintendo Switch on October 3, 2019, and the PlayStation 4 on May 22, 2020. Both console versions are to get a limited physical release, done in a partnership with Limited Run Games. An update in March 2018 replaced most character and background art with higher quality ones, as well as a new score composed by Luiza Carvalho. These updates were also included in the console versions.

== Reception ==
Reception

Aggregate score
Aggregator	Score
GameRankings	55%

Review scores
Publication	Score
Hardcore Gamer	2/5
RPGFan	69%

According to Munisix, the game was a commercial success, with the series selling over 480,000 copies by September 2019. The Steam release had an estimated total of 108,000 players by July 2018. It was met by a wide range of reviews, with some critical and some positive. Jenni Lada at PC Gamer included the game on a list of "the best visual novels for beginners".

Geoff Thew at Hardcore Gamer was disappointed with the lack of player choices, saying that experimenting with various consequences is "the whole draw of visual novels"; for visual novels without branching stories, he thought that puzzle gameplay mechanics are required to keep the player interested, and that without either, it could have instead been a manga or light novel. Andrew Barker at RPGFan questioned why the single player choice was included, calling it pointless and "almost a tease for players wishing they had more control over the events". Thew called the artwork lackluster, with the world and characters looking "ugly and flat"; he liked the shading, but said that the proportions are off for most characters, particularly the men, and that perspective is handled incorrectly. Barker said that the presentation felt low-budget: he called the character design excellent, with elegant character artwork, but found the background art and music to be dull and lifeless. Thew liked the music, calling the atmospheric songs used in dramatic scenes "powerful and subtle", but found the music used in comedic scenes annoying. However, he was disappointed with the game's localization, calling it stiff and unnatural, and full of spelling mistakes and grammatical errors. He also found problems with the game's tense, as it switches between present and past, and how the narration sometimes switches from Ritona's perspective to a "detached, omniscient third person". Meanwhile, Barker thought that the translation was well done, and that the script was mostly free of errors; he did however find it to read awkwardly at times, with unnatural-sounding dialogue. Ethan thought that Sekai Project had done a good job with the game's presentation, calling it a "professional package". A writer for Impress Watch liked the presentation, praising the character art, the graphics and the user interface.

The game's story received mixed reception. Thew enjoyed the premise and Rune's history, calling it "interesting and thematically resonant", but found it too disconnected from the main story. Barker liked the story; he said that it, while poorly paced, is compelling as a standalone story, but that it does not work as a first episode, with the characters and setting not being established properly. Thew found the game world interesting, calling the detailed magic system fascinating, but felt that the exposition of it was overly long and clunky, and unnecessary due to the included encyclopedia that already explains it. Meanwhile, Barker felt that the world and setting was not explained enough, with the move from "swords and sorcery to medicine and robotics" not feeling believable due to being poorly explained. Impress Watch did however like the world building, calling it unique and believable, and commenting that it made use of magic without turning it into a miraculous power that can accomplish anything. Ethan at Siliconera felt that the story did not begin strongly, with the conflict in the beginning not being explained, but liked the main story arc about Rune, saying that it "hooked [him] something fierce". He liked the structure, with a full narrative that ties up at the end, comparing it favorably to the first episode of the visual novel World End Economica. Both Thew and Barker called the characters clichéd; Thew felt that it is acceptable to use archetypes, but that the game treats them as if they are unique and difficult to comprehend. Barker cited Rudo as an exception, who he felt was more interesting and had realistic motivations. Ethan commented on the lack of sexual content, saying that while he does not mind the existence of it, it was not needed in Fault Milestone One in his opinion, and that he appreciated how the developers had not felt the need to include it anyway.
