= Narcissu: Side 2nd =

2007 video game

Narcissu -Side 2nd-
- Developer: Stage-nana
- Publishers: Agilis (English version); Sekai Project
- Series: Narcissu
- Platform: Cross-platform
- Release: May 15, 2007
- Genre: Visual novel
- Mode: Single player

Screenshot of gameplay in Narcissu -Side 2nd-

Narcissu -Side 2nd- is the prequel to the visual novel Narcissu, produced by Stage-nana. A preview version was sold at Comiket 70 for ¥200, and has since been released for free download. On May 15, 2007, the entire game was released and made available for download on stage-nana's website. The English version was released on March 31, 2010, by Agilis, after "close to 3 years of blood, sweat, and hard work." Like the Japanese version, this release contains both the prequel and the original. The translation was done in Proportional ONscripter, a fork of ONscripter and a clone of Nscripter, which supports English text as opposed to Nscripter which in turn, doesn't. Additionally, Side 2nd includes both games' soundtracks accessible from the menu of the game.

The game has been released in English with both games included with the option of picking different translations (being from Agilis and Haeleth). The game is playable in either voiced or unvoiced with unvoiced being preferred by the creator. It has been expressed that there were inconsistencies within the original game such as Setsumi never mentioning Himeko but the original creator asks if the player could "think of that as her just not simply expressing it directly".

In-game illustration were drawn by Goto-P except for an image by Yuuki Tsukasa and an image of Yuka by Kyalme. The staff of Cotton-soft also provided help with the design, system and sound editing.

== Plot ==
The game serves as a prequel to the first game, the plot revolves around Setsumi, the female main character from the original visual novel, and the people and circumstances that formed the character presented in the first game.

Narcissu 2 is set about six or seven years before the events of the original Narcissu, while Setsumi was still just a regular outpatient living at home near the hospital. We meet Himeko, a former 7th floor helper at the hospital. Cheerful and full of energy, no one expected that she would one day be a patient in the same ward that she had spent so much time volunteering at. One summer day, while Setsumi was going to the hospital for an examination, Setsumi meets Himeko, and a long summer begins...

== Characters ==
Himeko Shinohara
Voiced by: Natsumi Yanase
A 23-year-old girl 7th-floor resident who loves cars and looking at maps. She calls herself a "pseudo-Catholic".

Setsumi Sakura
Voiced by: Rino Ayakawa
A quiet 15-year-old girl who befriends Himeko and calls her "Onee-san".

Chihiro Shinohara
Voiced by: Yuko Goto
Himeko's younger sister. A devout Christian believer with a kind personality and a 7th-floor volunteer.

Yuka Akishima
Voiced by: Yukiko Iwai
Himeko's best friend. She's slightly tsundere and girlish, as opposed to Himeko.

Little Girl
Voiced by: Mamiko Noto
A 7th-floor patient that Himeko was charged with. A pure and innocent girl who longs for her parents.

Setsumi's mother
A bright and cheerful person who works hard to pay for Setsumi's hospital fees.

== Gameplay ==
Narcissu: Side 2nd has minimal gameplay in the traditional sense. Player interaction is limited to clicking to advance the text, graphics and sound, although the game features an 'autoplay' mode that makes even this unnecessary.

Narcissu does not contain any decision points at all unlike a lot of visual novels, because it is a member sub category of visual novel known as kinetic novel.

The characters are portrayed by voice actors who recorded out of their schedules and spare time. Voices are optional however; the game is playable in either voiced or unvoiced mode.

== Soundtrack ==
Below is the soundtrack used in Narcissu: Side 2nd as taken from the game. Many different musicians provided music for the game, some being musicians used in the first game and entirely new musicians.

No.	Title	Length
1.	"Narcissus" (Lyrics by Riya, music by Hajime Kikuchi and vocals by Eufonius)
2.	"Rumbling Viaduct 2007" (Composed and arranged by Ebi - sound Union)
3.	"Himeko's Theme" (Composed and arranged by Ebi - sound Union)
4.	"Suppressed Lies" (Composed and arranged by Ryo Mizutsuki)
5.	"Pineapple Tree" (Composed and arranged by Barbarian On The Groove)
6.	"South-Facing Window" (Composed and arranged by Souten)
7.	"Roadster" (Composed and arranged by ONOKEN)
8.	"For Whose Sake" (Composed and arranged by SENTIVE)
9.	"Lamune '79" (Composed by Hitoshi Fujima - Elements Garden, arranged by Akira Kannai - TGZ)
10.	"Morning View" (Composed and arranged by Ryo Mizutsuki)
11.	"Narcissus Instrumental Version" (Composed and arranged by Hajime Kikuchi)
12.	"Showery Sky" (Composed and arranged by Ebi - Sound Union)
13.	"Evening Primrose" (Composed by 443, arranged by Nekono Kometto)
14.	"15cm" (Composed by Takashi - Σ-sigma-, music by sin - Σ-sigma-, Vocals by KAKO)
