= Highway Blossoms =

2016 video game

- Developer: Studio Élan (Note: The developer was known as AlienWorks at the game's release.)
- Publishers: Sekai Project; Studio Élan
- Director: Syon Santeria
- Designers: Myuto; Shiyun
- Programmer: Kevin Turner
- Writers: Josh Kaplan; Syon Santeria
- Composers: Able Kirby; BAGman; Jake Abernathie; Smoke Thief
- Platform: Windows
- Release: June 17, 2016
- Genre: Visual novel
- Mode: Single-player

Highway Blossoms is a 2016 yuri romance visual novel developed by Studio Élan.

Set in the American Southwest, the game follows Amber Golley and Marina Hale on their search for a hidden treasure. The game received positive reception.

== Plot ==
Highway Blossoms is set in the American Southwest and follows Amber Golley (voiced by Katie Dagnen in the remastered version) and Marina Hale (voiced by Jill Harris in the remastered version) after the former picks up the latter. The game begins in New Mexico where Amber, en route to California, comes across Marina, who just had her car run out of gas in the middle of the desert. Marina had been in search of a recently hidden treasure that attracted many other travelers; Amber had been unaware of this situation until the two are told about it at a gas station.

Marina shares with Amber that she had set out from nearby Carlsbad in search of the treasure. Skeptical about the situation, Amber chooses to help Marina in her search. The two come across a trio of treasure hunters who seek to find the treasure before Amber and Marina.

== Development and release ==
A few years out of high school, the game's writer Josh Kaplan sought more yuri games in the indie game space, and as a result went on to co-write Highway Blossoms. Kaplan stated "In 2016, there weren't a whole lot of yuri visual novels available in English, especially on Steam."

Sekai Project announced the game at Anime Weekend Atlanta on September 26, 2015, and in 2016 opened a Steam Greenlight page for the game. Highway Blossoms was initially released without any voice acting and its sound was limited to an acoustic soundtrack. An adult content patch was made freely available. The developer later released a remastered version of the game featuring voice-overs for the characters.

A sequel, Highway Blossoms: Next Exit, was released as DLC in 2020. In 2021, Studio Élan announced plans for a console port.

By June 2023, Highway Blossoms had sold over 150,000 copies.

== Reception ==
Reception

Review scores
Publication	Score
Hardcore Gamer	4/5
Okazu	8/10

Highway Blossoms received positive reviews for its visuals, story, and soundtrack. Kaplan also noted that the game "ended up being unexpectedly successful," stating that "it found an audience of primarily LGBT readers who appreciated what they felt was a more realistic approach to same-sex relationships." Due to the game's success, Kaplan went on to found Studio Élan.

Writing for Hardcore Gamer, Marcus Estrada rated the game 4/5 points, commenting on the high quality of the game's backdrops of natural landmarks and parks, saying they were awe-invoking. He further praised the game's CGs (cutscene graphics) and character sprites, but noted that there were multiple artists working on them, resulting in the game's visuals not feeling "entirely cohesive." With regards to the game's writing, Estrada stated that there was little to criticize, praising Amber and Marina's character development throughout the narrative. Mitch Jay Lineham of PCGamesN called Highway Blossoms "one of the finest yuri – and romance – visual novels on Steam", praising its "heartwarming story" and "stunning, atmospheric soundtrack." Jade King of TheGamer wrote that "Highway Blossoms is so soft and sweet, its narrative outfitted with minimal stakes as it hopes to take us on a journey that is equally warm and mysterious." King went on to praise the small cast, which allowed the writers to develop each character "with appropriate nuance and just the right amount of attention."

Erica Friedman of Okazu rated the game 8/10 points and generally praised it, saying that the writing of Amber and Marina kept her interested in the story and that she appreciated the game for its differences from other yuri visual novels, particularly the choice to set the story on a road trip rather than the more common setting of a high school. She also said that the romance was "touching," and that the sex scenes included in the adult patch, while unnecessary, "weren't terribly written". Friedman's only major criticisms were the writing of the supporting cast, and some lack of articulation in the 2D sprites. Tyler Terese of GameRevolution wrote that "while the backdrop is plenty interesting, the main draw is the relationship between the two main characters, Amber and Marina. The duo has an undeniable chemistry, and it becomes hard to stop playing as the game's story continues on."

== See also ==
- List of video games with LGBTQ characters: 2010s
