= Yuki Yagi =

Japanese voice actress and singer

- 八木 侑紀
- Born: 7 December
- Occupations: Voice actress; singer
- Years active: 2011–present
- Employer: Production Ace
- Notable work: My Girlfriend is Shobitch as Kanata Shinozaki; Kaiju Girls (Black) as Alien Pegassa; Kemono Michi: Rise Up as Hanako; Nekopara as Chocola

Yuki Yagi (八木 侑紀, Yagi Yuki; born 7 December) is a Japanese voice actress and singer from Osaka Prefecture, affiliated with Production Ace. She is known for starring as Kanata Shinozaki in My Girlfriend is Shobitch, Alien Pegassa in Kaiju Girls (Black), Hanako in Kemono Michi: Rise Up, and Chocola in Nekopara.

== Biography ==
Yuki Yagi, a native of Osaka Prefecture, was born on 7 December. She was inspired to go into voice acting by the anime Cardcaptor Sakura. She performed at the 2011 Osaka Castle Summer Festival stage play Naniwa no Yume: Jō o kizuku zo! Ore-tachi no and was the narrator of AT-X Anime Ranking 2014.

She starred as Kanata Shinozaki in My Girlfriend is Shobitch, and she sang its ending theme song "Ai no Himitsu" as part of the quartet Puare. She starred as Alien Pegassa in the 2018 film Kaiju Girls (Black) and did the opening theme "Honseisō Kōshinkyoku" as part of the tie-in unit Black Stars, and she later starred as Hanako in Kemono Michi: Rise Up. She also stars in the Nekopara franchise as Chocola, and she performed the 2020 anime's opening theme "Shiny Happy Days" alongside the cast.

Her special skills are baton twirling and piano. Yagi is a qualified librarian.

== Filmography ==
=== Television animation ===
Year	Title	Role	Ref.
2015	Anti-Magic Academy: The 35th Test Platoon		
2015	Sky Wizards Academy		
2017	My First Girlfriend Is a Gal		
2017	My Girlfriend Is Shobitch	Kanata Shinozaki	
2018	Chio's School Road		
2018	Magical Girl Ore	Yōma	
2019	Kemono Michi: Rise Up	Hanako	
2019	Wise Man's Grandchild	Test tube, etc.	
2020	Nekopara	Chocola	

=== Animated film ===
Year	Title	Role	Ref.
2018	Kaiju Girls (Black)	Alien Pegassa	

=== Video games ===
Year	Title	Role	Ref.
2019	Jinrui no Minasama e	Sukhaya Shuka	
201X	Nekopara Vol. 4: Neko to Patisserie no Noel	Chocola	
