= Heart of the Woods =

2019 video game

- Developer: Studio Élan
- Publisher: Studio Élan
- Director: Josh Kaplan
- Writers: Rachel Gruber, Josh Kaplan
- Composers: Esselfortium, Astartus
- Engine: Ren'Py
- Platforms: Linux macOS; Microsoft Windows; Nintendo Switch; PlayStation 4 PlayStation 5 Xbox One; Xbox Series X/S
- Release: Linux, macOS, Windows; February 15, 2019; Nintendo Switch; July 8, 2021; PlayStation 4, PlayStation 5 February 14, 2022; Xbox One, Xbox Series X/S; TBA
- Genre: Visual novel
- Mode: Single-player

Heart of the Woods is a 2019 yuri romance visual novel developed and published by Studio Élan. The game follows a pair of influencers as they travel to a remote village where ghosts are rumored to reside. The game launched on February 15, 2019, for Linux, macOS, and Microsoft Windows. A port for the Nintendo Switch released on July 8, 2021, and for PlayStation 4 and PlayStation 5 on February 14, 2022, with Xbox One and Xbox Series X/S versions being planned for release.

== Gameplay ==
The game is a typical visual novel, with the player's main form of interaction being clicking forward through text to progress between scenes. At certain moments, the player can make decisions that can lead to one of the three alternate endings (two of which are bad endings and the third is a good ending).

== Plot ==
Madison "Maddie" Raines plans to quit her job as manager of her best friend Tara Bryck's paranormal vlog, Taranormal. She agrees to take one last trip with Tara to the village of Eysenfeld at the request of its outcast, Morgan Fischer. Upon arriving, they meet Evelyn, Morgan's abusive mother, and the mayor of Eysenfeld. Maddie is skeptical of any supernatural forces in Eysenfeld, and her friendship with Tara strains further.

Tara and Morgan begin to fall in love, and Morgan reveals the true reason why she called Taranormal: Evelyn is an evil supernatural creature that plans to take Morgan's body as a vessel. Meanwhile, Maddie befriends a ghostly woman, Abigail, who has been in the forest for over 200 years. Evelyn lures Maddie into a savage blizzard with an illusion of Tara, where she freezes to death, but Abigail and her friend, the forest spirit, save her soul. Maddie is now like Abigail: an incorporeal being between life and death, sustained by the forest's magic. Abigail takes Maddie to the fairy grove. Here, Abigail reveals that Eysenfeld is cursed and the townsfolk have been performing sacrifices to stop the town from being destroyed by a curse, but they didn't know that their church's priest (who would eventually become Evelyn) is the one who is responsible for the curse and had manipulated the townsfolk. Abigail was going to be sacrificed, but the ritual failed, and she was saved by the forest spirit. She and Maddie begin to develop romantic feelings towards one another.

Morgan's cat, Geladura, reveals to Tara that she can talk, as she was once a fairy before Evelyn cursed her. Meanwhile, Maddie and Abigail encounter fairies, who are waiting for their queen to return. They ask Maddie to be their new queen, but she declines. Sometime later, Evelyn destroys an ancestral tree in the forest and forces Morgan to help her; this damages the forest's magic, causing Maddie to start fading. Abigail explains that the forest spirit's destiny is to become a new sacred tree, but it needs the missing fairy queen's help to do so. Out of options, they make a deal with the fairies to restore them to life in return for Maddie becoming their queen. If Maddie does not find someone to become the new queen and stop Evelyn before she can perform the ritual, Maddie will be their queen permanently. Maddie uses her new powers to revive herself and Abigail, and they reunite with Morgan and Tara. Maddie and Tara make amends while Morgan reveals that Abigail is actually her ancestor. Geladura reveals that she can speak to Abigail and Maddie, having refused to do so earlier as she was distrustful of them at first. They then travel to the fairy grove, where the fairies recognize Geladura as their real queen, who was forced to resign after Evelyn cursed her. They also learn that Evelyn was once a fairy, who eventually became a rogue.

That night, Tara is kidnapped by Evelyn, who decides to use her as the next vessel instead of Morgan. The women interrupt the ritual and battle Evelyn; the confrontation eventually moves to the fairy grove. The outcome will depend on the player's earlier choices, which will lead to one of the three endings:

- Sacrifice Ending: Morgan sacrifices herself to kill Evelyn and break Geladura's curse. Morgan's death devastates Tara, and she grows distant from Maddie, who blames herself. As they return home with Abigail, Maddie hopes that they will make amends in time.
- Freedom Ending: Geladura returns to her true form and sacrifices herself to kill Evelyn, breaking the curse. Without Geladura, Maddie must stay in the forest forever and become the new fairy queen. She and Abigail then disappear, leaving Tara and Morgan devastated. Later, Tara quits Taranormal while Morgan blames herself for what happened. She and Morgan marry sometime in the future, thanking Maddie, Abigail, and Geladura for their happiness.
- True Ending: Maddie uses all of her power to return Geladura to her true form; unlike the other endings, she doesn't appear as a silhouette. Geladura then kills Evelyn, but also mourns for who she once was. With the curse broken, Geladura retakes her position as the fairy queen, freeing Maddie from this role and permanently returning her and Abigail to life. She creates a new fairy based on Maddie's likeness and helps the forest spirit become the new ancestral tree. The women visit the fairy grove one last time before returning to the city with Abigail and Morgan, planning to teach Abigail more about the modern world and have Morgan take over Maddie's duties on Taranormal. During the summer, they visit a beach.

== Development ==
Earlier in development, the setting was completely different, with it being a time-travel story set in a small town. The developers said that they kept "running into plot holes or having trouble making certain parts interesting, so we decided to start from scratch." They maintained that one element kept from the earlier version was "love across time and boundaries". In terms of the soundtrack, the developers focused on using leitmotifs in order to represent certain elements of the game world, like snow, and also used silence to heighten the dramatic tension of scenes.

== Reception ==
Digitally Downloaded gave the game a positive review, liking how the mystery and romance elements blended, the reviewer did feel the game had a poor opening, writing that "Heart of the Woods does start slowly... This set-up is more than a little melodramatic, and it meanders its way to its conclusion."

PSX Brasil was positive overall, but described the game as a story that is divided between a romance that does not seem very believable and a mystery with a predictable outcome, not reaching its full potential, and it ends up leaving something to be desired.

Siliconera praised the writing of the lesbian characters and their relationships, but criticized the frequent crashes in the Nintendo Switch version.
