= Nekopara =

2014 visual novel series

- Nekopara Vol. 1 cover art

ネコぱら
- Genres: Eroge, Visual novel
- Developer: NEKO WORKs
- Publishers: Sekai Project (Windows); CFK (PS4, Switch)
- Creator: Sayori
- Platforms: Microsoft Windows; Nintendo Switch; PlayStation 4
- First release: Nekopara Vol. 1 December 29, 2014
- Latest release: Nekopara After: La Vraie Famille; June 12, 2025 (EU, USA); June 13, 2025 (Japan)
- Original video animation
- Directed by: Hayashi Hiroki
- Produced by: Ankou; Takashi Nakanishi
- Written by: Yūta Kikuchi
- Music by: Yūgo Maeda
- Studio: ixtl Felix Film
- Released: December 22, 2017
- Runtime: 58 minutes
- Manga
- Illustrated by: Tam-U
- Published by: ASCII Media Works
- English publisher: NA: Sekai Project
- Magazine: Dengeki G's Comic
- Original run: May 30, 2018 – present
- Original net animation

Nekopara Extra
- Directed by: Yasutaka Yamamoto
- Produced by: Ankou; Takashi Nakanishi
- Written by: Gō Zappa
- Music by: Yūgo Maeda
- Studio: anchor (Note: ixtl renamed to anchor in between productions.); Felix Film
- Released: July 27, 2018
- Runtime: 21 minutes
- Anime television series
- Directed by: Yasutaka Yamamoto
- Written by: Gō Zappa
- Music by: Akiyuki Tateyama
- Studio: Felix Film
- Licensed by: Crunchyroll: SA/SEA: Muse Communication
- Original network: AT-X, Tokyo MX, BS11
- English network: SEA: Aniplus Asia
- Original run: January 9, 2020 – March 26, 2020
- Episodes: 12

Nekopara (Japanese: ネコぱら), tag-lined Cats Paradise, is a series of slice-of-life eroge visual novels developed by NEKO WORKs and published by Sekai Project. The first release in the series, Nekopara Vol. 1, was released in December 2014, taking place in a world where humans live alongside catgirls. The series follows Minazuki siblings, Kashou and Shigure, who have created a found family of 6 catgirls over time named Chocola, Vanilla, Azuki, Maple, Coconut, and Cinnamon. It is centered around work life at Kashou's pâtisserie and home life at Shigure's family house, as well as the amusements and dramas of everyday life.

An all-ages anime OVA adaptation was released on Steam in December 2017. An anime original television series adaptation by Felix Film aired from January to March 2020. The anime is licensed in the United States, Canada, United Kingdom, Ireland, Australia, New Zealand, Mexico, Brazil, Chile, Peru and Colombia by Funimation. NEKO WORKs announced on November 29, 2021, that a new title for the series, After: La Vraie Famille was confirmed to be under development. It was eventually released on June 30, 2025, on Steam with physical copies released late summer of that same year through the developer's Pixiv Booth.

A gacha game subtitled Sekai Connect was released in April 2026 for Android and iOS, with a PC client expected later. The series is to be succeeded by the upcoming InuPara.

== Experience ==
As Nekopara is a kinetic visual novel, the majority of interactions consists of the player reading the game's story. Nekopara does not offer choices to the player throughout progression, and the user has no influence over the story, similar to a book with multimedia elements. The releases are fully all voiced (except for the protagonist) and utilize a system called "E-mote" that allows the characters to be animated, instead of stationary sprites. Nekopara Vol. 0 added a new feature where the player can click on characters mid-scene, to "pet" them. The girls will react in different ways depending on where the player pets them.

== Plot ==
=== Extra ===
Taking place six months before Vol 1, this game focuses on the Minaduki household back when Chocola and Vanilla were kittens struggling to adapt to the family.

=== Vol. 0 ===
This prequel to Vol. 1 provides a look at a day in the life of Shigure and the six catgirls in the family house. There is little to no involvement of the previous protagonist Kashou Minaduki.

=== Vol. 1 ===
Kashou Minaduki is an aspiring chef who moves away from home to open his own confection shop. While he is unpacking in his new shop, he discovers that two of his family catgirls, Chocola and Vanilla, came along with him by hiding in cardboard boxes. After the two catgirls convince Kashou to let them stay and live with him, the three of them work together to run his shop, La Soleil. During the story, Kashou receives a couple of visits from his younger sister Shigure and the other four catgirls owned by their family.

=== Vol. 2 ===
Shigure and the other four catgirls, Maple, Cinnamon, Coconut and Azuki, begin working at La Soleil. This volume focuses primarily on the contentious relationship between Coconut and Azuki, who struggle to find their place at the shop.

=== Vol. 3 ===
The story of La Soleil continues. This volume focuses primarily on the strong relationship between Maple and Cinnamon, as Maple tries to make a dream come true.

=== Vol. 4 ===
La Soleil and the Minaduki family prepare to enter the Christmas season. This volume focuses primarily on Kashou and figuring out what baking truly means to him so he can do his mentor proud and earn the approval of his father.

=== After ===
Taking place in the Summer Months, This volume focuses on the Minaduki household heading to Hawaii and the blooming of the relationship between brother Kashou and sister Shigure, as well as the rivalry of love between Shigure and Fraise.

== Characters ==
Kashou Minaduki (水無月 嘉祥, Minazuki Kashou)
Voiced by: Shinnosuke Tachibana (OVA, TV series), unvoiced in visual novels (Japanese); Seth Magill (TV series only) (English)
Kashou is the protagonist of most of the visual novel games in the series. Kashou comes from a family with a long line of chefs, and decides to move away from home and open his own pâtisserie (pastry shop) despite his parents' wishes. It is revealed that Kashou studied abroad in France and sought to honor his mentor by focusing his baking talents towards Western-style confections, naming his pâtisserie La Soleil after his mentor's own pâtisserie.

Shigure Minaduki (水無月 時雨, Minazuki Shigure)
Voiced by: Mai Nagai (credited as Emi Sakura in visual novels); M.A.O (TV series) (Japanese); Emily Fajardo (TV series only) (English)
Kashou's younger sister. She appears to have romantic feelings for Kashou in an incestuous way. She and her older brother are the owners of the Minaduki family catgirls.

Chocola (ショコラ, Shokora)
Voiced by: Maki Tomonaga (credited as Himari in visual novels); Yuki Yagi (TV series) (Japanese); Bryn Apprill (TV series only) (English)
Chocola is a cheerful and energetic brown-haired catgirl; she is often described as "happy go lucky" and always describes herself in the third person. She is Vanilla's twin sister and moved in with Kashou after he started his own business.

Vanilla (バニラ, Banira)
Voiced by: Yuka Inokuchi (credited as Amu Nakamura in visual novels); Iori Saeki (TV series) (Japanese); Natalie Hoover (TV series only) (English)
Vanilla is a calm and quiet white-haired catgirl. She rarely expresses her emotions, making her a somewhat of a kūdere character. She loves her twin sister Chocola, and often follows her anywhere she goes. She and Chocola are the youngest of the Minaduki family catgirls throughout most of the series.

Coconut (ココナツ, Kokonatsu)
Voiced by: Ryōko Tezuka (visual novels) (credited as Megumi Tateishi in the OVA); Marin Mizutani (TV series) (Japanese); Morgan Lauré (TV series only) (English)
Coconut is the third youngest of the Minaduki family catgirls. Other characters praise her for her "cool" personality, but she wishes she were cute rather than cool. She suffers from low self-esteem because of her klutziness and self-proclaimed lack of skills. She also tries to do more than she can to seem more like an older sister, as well as to not seem to burden Kashou and the other catgirls. She has heterochromia, with her right eye being yellow and left eye being blue. She is a Maine Coon, and thus looks much older than her age or personality would suggest.

Azuki (アズキ)
Voiced by: Mia Naruse; Shiori Izawa (TV series) (Japanese); Luci Christian (TV series only) (English)
Azuki is the oldest of the Minaduki family catgirls. Despite being the oldest, she is also the shortest and has a mischievous personality. However, she lives up to being the eldest catgirl by effortlessly managing and leading her sisters as they work in Kashou's pâtisserie. She also has a tsundere personality, acting sarcastic and tough to hide her real emotions towards everyone. She is a Munchkin cat, and thus retains a loli body-type despite her years lived.

Maple (メイプル, Meipuru)
Voiced by: Airi Ishihara (credited as Yui Ogura in visual novels); Miku Itō (TV series) (Japanese); Anastasia Muñoz, Jad Saxton (Young Maple) (TV series only) (English)
Maple is the second oldest of the Minaduki family catgirls. She has an independent/mature personality, as well as a hint of tsundere given that she is typically dishonest with herself. She enjoys visiting cafes to try different food and drinks. She aspires to be a singer but is held back by her own lack of self-confidence as well as the prospect that she will only ever make it big because she is a catgirl. She is an American Curl.

Cinnamon (シナモン, Shinamon)
Voiced by: Tae Okajima (OVA) (credited as Uyu Arisaka in the visual novels); Yuri Noguchi (TV series) (Japanese); Kristen McGuire (TV series only) (English)
Cinnamon is the third oldest of the Minaduki family catgirls. She frequently interprets things in a sexual manner and ends up becoming aroused. She has purple hair, and she has the largest bust size of all the catgirls. She is closest to Maple and thus aspires to be by her side to support her life decisions. She is a Scottish Fold.

Cacao (カカオ, Kakao)
Voiced by: Yuuka Morishima (TV series only) (Japanese); Tabitha Ray (TV series only) (English)
Cacao is the youngest of the Minaduki family catgirls. She is a character who debuted in the animated series. She has mint green hair and always wears a hat. She was formerly a homeless catgirl before being brought into the Minaduki household by Chocola.

Beignet (ベニエ, Benie)
First appearing in Volume 4, Beignet is a pastry chef who lives in France. She is the mentor of Kashou. She eventually closes her pâtisserie to travel the world and leaves Fraise in Kashou's care.

Fraise (フレーズ, Furēzu)
Voiced by: Nozomi Yamamoto
First appearing in Volume 4, Fraise lives with Beignet in France and helps manage her patisserie. After Beignet chooses to retire, Fraise was entrusted to Kashou to assist him in La Soleil, where she proves to be a very capable hand in the business and a quick learner to assist everyone in their duties, though she tends to downplay her feats and feels out of place as a new member of the Minaduki family. She has pink hair and is usually depicted wearing a light-blue dress with white stripes. She is a Chinchilla Persian.

== Release history ==
Release timeline
| 2014 | Vol. 1 |
| 2015 | Vol. 0 |
| 2016 | Vol. 2 |
| 2017 | Vol. 3 |
| 2018 | Extra |
2019
| 2020 | Vol. 4 |
2021
2022
2023
2024
| 2025 | After: La Vraie Famille |
| 2026 | Sekai Connect |

Nekopara Vol. 1, was released in two versions: an uncensored adult version that includes explicit sex scenes and nudity, and a censored all ages version where the explicit content is removed. Volume 1 received a release date of December 30, 2014. An all ages fan disc titled Nekopara Vol. 0 was released on August 17, 2015. Nekopara Vol. 2 was released on February 20, 2016. Nekopara Vol. 3 was originally scheduled to release on April 28, 2017, but it ended up being delayed to May 26, 2017. Shortly after Volume 3 was released, NEKO WORKs announced that Volume 4 was "coming soon". It was later revealed that Volume 4: Neko to Patisserie no Noel was scheduled for November 27, 2020.

Nekopara was ported and released on PlayStation 4 and Nintendo Switch in 2018.

A spin-off game, NEKOPALIVE, was released on Steam on June 1, 2016.

An otome game spin-off, Nekopara – Catboys Paradise, which originally began as an April Fools' joke in 2019, was released for PC, iOS, and Android devices on July 15, 2021. The visual novel features four fully-voiced male characters with multiple routes for each character, along with subtitles in Japanese, English, and both Traditional and Simplified Chinese.

A mini visual novel based on the childhood of Chocola and Vanilla and the other Minaduki catgirls was confirmed to be produced after reaching the $800 000 stretch goal on the Nekopara OVA Kickstarter. It was later announced that the title would be Nekopara Extra, and was released on July 27, 2018.

It was revealed in November 2021, that a new volume called After: La Vraie Famille was in development. It was then announced on 11 April 2025, that Nekopara After: La Vraie Famille was going to release on 23 May 2025, but was delayed till 13 June 2025 due to Steam's reviewing process being stonewalled.

=== Sales ===
As of May 2016, the Nekopara series had sold over 500,000 copies. By April 2017, that number had doubled, surpassing one million copies. One year later, in April 2018, the series had sold over 2 million copies. As of April 2020, the series has sold 3 million copies on Steam. NEKO WORKs announced on November 29, 2021, that franchise sales have exceeded 5 million. As of April 2024, the series has sold over 6 million units worldwide.

== Reception ==
Hardcore Gamer gave Nekopara Vol. 1 a positive review, stating that "Nekopara is a light and fluffy visual novel that fans of catgirls will enjoy," but noted that "some may be put off by the sexual storyline aspect."

In May 2021, Nekopara was one of five isekai-oriented anime titles (along with KonoSuba, That Time I Got Reincarnated as a Slime, Princess Lover!, and Zombie Land Saga) that were given a limited ban by the Russian government for their depiction of reincarnation, despite the series itself never dabbling in isekai tropes.

== Music ==
=== Background Music ===
Nekopara's background music was written by Mizuki Shinjin.

=== Opening and Ending Themes ===
- The opening theme for Vol. 1, "Taiyou Paradise," was sung by nao, and the ending theme, "Nekomanma Biyori," was sung by Haruka Shimotsuki.
- The opening theme for Vol. 2, "Doki Doki kokoro Flavor," as well as the ending theme, "100Nyan Power de Yumegokoti" were composed by Team-OZ and sung by Yui Sakakibara.
- The opening theme for Vol. 3, "Nekoichi," as well as the ending theme, "Growing" were composed by Peak A Soul+, written by Sinitiro Yamashita, and sung by Duca.
- The opening theme for Vol. 4, "SWEETxSWEET," as well as the ending theme, "NEGAIGOTO" were composed by Rei Kamiya and Eiji Kawai, and sung by Kotoko.
- The Opening theme for After, "Contrail" was composed by "Motokyio" and Sung by "Ceul".
- The Ending Theme for After, "Side by Side" was produced by popular music composer "Aiobahn +81" and sung by Hololive English's Fuwamoco (Fuwawa and Mococo), who are known fans of the Nekopara series and were former beta testers for Vol.1's release.

== Adaptations ==
=== Anime ===
==== OVA ====
In July 2016, Sekai Project announced that it would be running a Kickstarter campaign to fund an all-ages Nekopara original video animation adaptation. The campaign launched in December 2016, and reached its US$100,000 funding goal "mere hours" after launching. The campaign ended on Kickstarter on February 11, 2017, and raised US$963,376 from 9,322 backers, however, was extended in order to reach the final stretch goal. In March 2017, the campaign formally ended on Sekai Project's "slacker backer" service, and raised a total of US$1,049,552. On December 4, 2017, Sekai Project announced that the OVA would be released on December 26, 2017, however, was later moved to December 22, 2017, due to a shipping error by Tokyo Otaku Mode, the company responsible for physical goods.

The opening theme for the OVA is "Baby→Lady LOVE" by Ray, while the ending theme is "▲MEW▲△MEW△CAKE" by Kotoko.

A second OVA, based on the Nekopara Extra visual novel, was released alongside the visual novel on July 27, 2018. The ending theme for Nekopara Extra is Symphony by Luce Twinkle Wink☆.

==== Television anime ====
During the Comiket 95 event, it was announced that an anime television series adaptation was in production. The series is animated by Felix Film and directed by Yasutaka Yamamoto, with Gō Zappa handling series composition, Yuichi Hirano designing the characters, and Akiyuki Tateyama composing the music. The first episode of the television anime premiered at Anime Expo 2019 on July 6, 2019, and the first two episodes aired at a special event in Tokyo on December 24, 2019. The series premiered on January 9, 2020, through March 26, 2020 on AT-X, Tokyo MX, and BS11. The opening theme for the anime is "Shiny Happy Days" by Yuki Yagi, Iori Saeki, Shiori Izawa, Miku Itō, Yuri Noguchi, and Marin Mizutani, and the ending theme is "Yōdamari no Kaori" (陽だまりの香り) by Yagi and Saeki. The series has aired for 12 episodes. Funimation acquired the series for distribution in North America, the British Isles, and Australasia, streaming the series on FunimationNow, Wakanim and AnimeLab, and produced an English dub for the series. The series simulcasts in Southeast Asia on Aniplus Asia. The series released to Blu-Ray by Funimation on May 18, 2021.

=== Manga ===
A manga adaptation illustrated by Tam-U is currently being published in Dengeki G's Comic magazine. The manga began serialisation in the July issue of Dengeki G's Comic on May 30, 2018. During Anime Expo 2018, Sekai Project announced that they would release the manga in English digitally, with the first chapter scheduled for release in August 2018.

=== Mobile games ===
In 2019, a mobile game adaptation of the series, Nekoparaiten!, was announced, being developed by Yostar; its release was planned to take place in 2020, but the game was cancelled due to various reasons. Its creators described Nekoparaiten! as a "romance simulation" game.

In 2024, during the series’ 10th anniversary, it was confirmed that Nekoparaiten! was canceled and was renamed to Nekopara Sekai Connect, developed by Good Smile Company. The game was released worldwide on April 14, 2026.
