= Sekai Project =

American video game publisher

- Industry: Computer games
- Genre: Visual novels
- Founder: Raymond Qian
- Headquarters: Los Angeles, California, United States
- Website: sekaiproject.com

Sekai Project is an American video game publisher. They are best known for licensing and translating Japanese visual novels into English, but they have also published manga and other non-visual novel video games.

== History ==
Sekai Project originated in 2007 as a fan translation group translating the visual novel School Days. They later partnered with publisher JAST USA, turning their fan translation into the official English version of the game. Sekai Project began publishing games on Steam in 2014; their first title was World End Economica episode.01, released in June. Sekai Project has used the crowdfunding platform Kickstarter to fund many of their projects. In November 2014, they launched a Kickstarter campaign to fund an English release of the visual novel Clannad. The campaign exceeded its goal of US$140,000 and ended up raising over US$500,000. In July 2015, Sekai Project announced that they would be localizing manga in addition to video games, starting with Gate.

Since Steam does not typically allow adult games to be sold on their platform, Sekai Project releases their adult titles through their partner company Denpasoft. For titles like The Fruit of Grisaia, an all-ages version is available on Steam, while the adult version is sold directly through the Denpasoft website.

In 2017, the company partnered with Humble Bundle, an online marketplace where games are sold based on what other users paid for them. As is usual for the Humble Bundle site, users were also able to donate a portion of their payment to the charity of their choice.

In June 2018, Sekai Project provided a censored version of the adult game Maitetsu to Fakku to distribute, contrary to what Sekai Project had promised them and their customers.

In August 2018, Sekai Project laid off some or all of their permanent staff in their Los Angeles office. In a statement to the press, they said most of the staff let go were in marketing, but one of their employees posted to Twitter claiming that every employee in the LA office was laid off. Most of the translation and programming work for the company is freelance work that is done remotely. This has continued since the layoffs.

== Sekai Games ==
In 2018, Sekai Project opened Sekai Games, a console-focused division within the company structure. Since then, Sekai Games has handled all publishing and marketing for their console releases. On April 14, 2020, Sekai Games and Limited Run Games released a physical edition of Clannad for Nintendo Switch.

== Works ==
=== Published games ===
Title	Developer	Publication date	Ref
World End Economica episode.01	Spicy Tails	June 17, 2014	
Sunrider: Mask of Arcadius	Love in Space	July 9, 2014	
Sakura Spirit	Winged Cloud	July 9, 2014	
Planetarian: The Reverie of a Little Planet	Key	September 12, 2014	
Rising Angels: Reborn	IDHAS Studios	September 12, 2014	
Pyrite Heart	Winged Cloud	September 25, 2014	
Fault Milestone One	Alice in Dissonance	December 15, 2014	
Nekopara Vol. 1	Neko Works	December 29, 2014	
Sakura Angels	Winged Cloud	January 16, 2015	
The Way We All Go	ebi-hime	March 24, 2015	
Sunrider Academy	Love in Space	April 15, 2015	
Narcissu 1st & 2nd	stage-nana	April 24, 2015	
The Reject Demon: Toko Chapter 0 — Prelude	Lupiesoft	May 8, 2015	
Love at First Sight	Creepy Cute	May 18, 2015	
Tobari and the Night of the Curious Moon	Desunoya	May 26, 2015	
Sakura Fantasy Chapter 1	Winged Cloud	May 29, 2015	
The Fruit of Grisaia	Front Wing	May 29, 2015	
Raiders Sphere 4th	Rectangle	June 1, 2015	
Ame no Marginal	stage-nana	July 7, 2015	
World End Economica episode.02	Spicy Tails	July 21, 2015	
Machina of the Planet Tree -Planet Ruler-	Denneko Yuugi	July 28, 2015	
Idol Magical Girl Chiru Chiru Michiru Part 1	Front Wing	July 29, 2015	
Idol Magical Girl Chiru Chiru Michiru Part 2	Front Wing	July 29, 2015	
Sakura Clicker	Winged Cloud	July 29, 2015	
Asphyxia	ebi-hime	August 4, 2015	
Sakura Beach	Winged Cloud	August 14, 2015	
Nekopara Vol. 0	Neko Works	August 17, 2015	
Fault Milestone Two Side: Above	Alice in Dissonance	September 7, 2015	
Sakura Swim Club	Winged Cloud	September 11, 2015	
Sound of Drop: Fall Into Poison	aiueoKompany	October 30, 2015	
G-senjou no Maou - The Devil on G-String	Akabeisoft2	November 5, 2015	
Sakura Beach 2	Winged Cloud	November 6, 2015	
Written in the Sky	Unwonted Studios	November 9, 2015	
Yohjo Simulator	Deadfactory	November 17, 2015	
Clannad	Key	November 23, 2015	
Reverse x Reverse	Desunoya	December 10, 2015	
Was: The Hourglass of Lepidoptera (Note: This title has been discontinued, and is no longer available for purchase on Steam.)	SRL	December 15, 2015	
Sakura Santa	Winged Cloud	December 21, 2015	
Strawberry Vinegar	ebi-hime	January 5, 2016	
The Sad Story of Emmeline Burns	ebi-hime	January 5, 2016	
No One But You	Unwonted Studios	January 19, 2016	
Narcissu 10th Anniversary Anthology Project	stage-nana	January 27, 2016	
Rabi-Ribi	CreSpirit	January 28, 2016	
Nekopara Vol. 2	Neko Works	February 19, 2016	
Atom Grrrl!!	Cosmillica	March 1, 2016	
Sunrider: Liberation Day	Love in Space	March 4, 2016	
Rising Angels: Hope	IDHAS Studios	March 18, 2016	
Starlight Vega	Razzart Visual	April 14, 2016	
Lucid9: Inciting Incident	Fallen Snow Studios	April 14, 2016	
Root Double: Before Crime * After Days	Regista, Yeti	April 27, 2016	
Selenon Rising	Fastermind Games	April 29, 2016	
Resette's Prescription: Book of memory, Swaying scale	Liz-Arts	May 30, 2016	
Nekopalive	Neko Works	May 31, 2016	
Clannad Side Stories	Key	June 2, 2016	
Sakura Dungeon	Winged Cloud	June 3, 2016	
Cherry Tree High Girls' Fight	773	June 13, 2016	
Highway Blossoms	Studio Élan, Studio Coattails	June 17, 2016	
The Orchard of Stray Sheep	Namaage	June 20, 2016	
My Little Kitties	Cosen	June 21, 2016	
The Labyrinth of Grisaia	Front Wing	June 22, 2016	
Karakara	calme	June 27, 2016	
Empty Horizons	ebi-hime	July 19, 2016	
Just Deserts	Vifth Floor	July 25, 2016	
Sakura Shrine Girls	Winged Cloud	August 26, 2016	
This World Unknown	ebi-hime	September 2, 2016	
Sakura Space	Winged Cloud	October 10, 2016	
Catch Canvas	Unwonted Studios, Razzart Visual	October 14, 2016	
Sakura Nova	Winged Cloud	October 20, 2016	
Ne No Kami: The Two Princess Knights of Kyoto	Kuro Irodoru Yomiji	October 26, 2016	
Memory's Dogma CODE:01	Liz-Arts	November 4, 2016	
AL･FINE	CrimsonRabbit	November 11, 2016	
A Magical High School Girl	illuCollab	November 22, 2016	
Love, Guitars, and the Nashville Skyline	Cosmillica	November 22, 2016	
Magical x Spiral	Broken Desk	December 20, 2016	
World End Economica episode.03	Spicy Tails	December 21, 2016	
Chrono Clock	Purple software	February 28, 2017	
PacaPlus	PacoProject	March 30, 2017	
The Eden of Grisaia	Front Wing	April 28, 2017	
Hoshizora no Memoria	Favorite	December 18, 2017	
Nekopara Vol. 3	Neko Works	May 26, 2017	
Project LUX	Spicy Tails	February 2, 2018	
Mhakna Gramura and Fairy Bell	Alice in Dissonance	February 19, 2018	
Kokonoe Kokoro	Nostalgia	March 2, 2018	
Tropical Liquor	Tentacle Games	March 9, 2018	
Re;Lord 1: The witch of Herfort and stuffed animals	Escu:de, Element	March 9, 2018	
Fatal Twelve	aiueokompany	March 30, 2018	
Nekopara Extra	Neko Works	July 27, 2018	
The Ditzy Demons Are in Love With Me	SMILE	October 26, 2018	
9-nine	Palette	January 31, 2019—March 19, 2021	
Heart of the Woods	Studio Élan	February 15, 2019	
M.A.S.S. Builder	Vermillion Digital	September 13, 2019	
Nekopara Vol. 4	Neko Works	November 26, 2020	
Nekopara - Catboys Paradise	Neko Works	July 15, 2021	
Rewrite+	Key	December 17, 2021	
Nekopara After	Neko Works	June 12, 2025	
Rewrite Harvest festa!	Key	July 14, 2025	

=== Upcoming games ===
Title	Developer	Status	Ref
Eternal	Mawari Works	TBA	
Fault Milestone Two Side: Below	Alice in Dissonance	2019	
Fault - Silence the Pedant	Alice in Dissonance	TBA	
Moonshot	Fastermind Games	TBA	
NarKarma EngineA	Novectacle	TBA	
November Boy	Team ANAGO	TBA	
The Human Reignition Project	Alienworks	TBA	
Hoshizora no Memoria -Eternal Heart- (fandisk)	Favorite	TBA	

=== Other releases ===
Title	Media format	Developer	Publication date	Ref
2013 Moe Headphones Design	Book	Lunatic Joker	2014	
Gate: Where The JSDF Fought	Manga	AlphaPolis	December 2016	
Clannad Anthology	Manga		TBA	
MikuMikuDance	Freeware	Yu Higuchi	TBA	
Ne no Kami	Manga	Fenrir Vier	TBA	
