= Michelle Rojas =

American voice actress (born 1987)

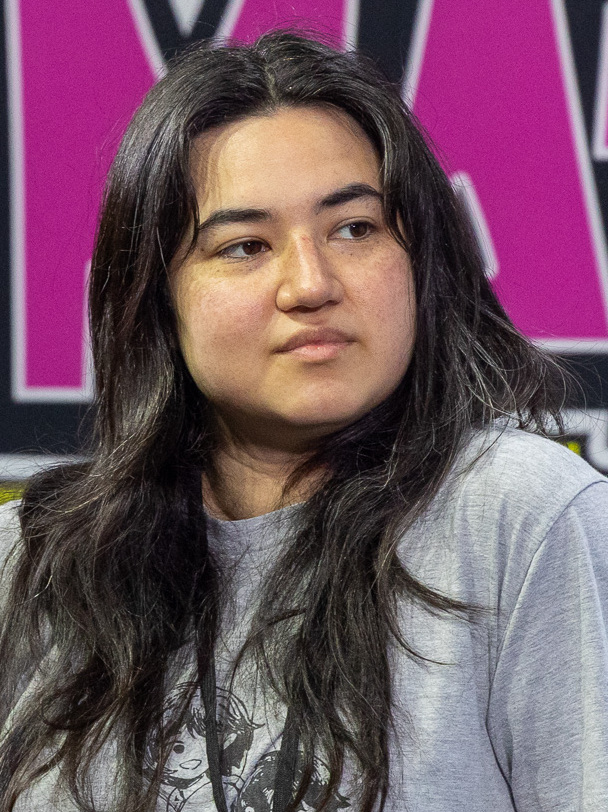
- Rojas at Animate! Columbus in 2025
- Born: Michelle Pennington; December 16, 1987 (age 38)
- Education: Navarro College; University of North Texas
- Occupations: Voice actress; ADR director
- Years active: 2009–present
- Spouse: Justin Rojas (div. 2018)
- Children: 1
- Website: www.michellerojas.com

Michelle Rojas (née Pennington; born December 16, 1987) is an American voice actress and director who is the founder and owner of Studio Nano. Some of her major roles are Tohka Yatogami in Date A Live, Zuikaku in Azur Lane, Kanade Sakurada in Castle Town Dandelion, Mikoto Sakuragawa in Gonna be the Twin-Tail!!, Kō Yagami in New Game!, Nashiro Yasuhisa in Tokyo Ghoul, Maya Sato in Classroom of the Elite, Toka Yada in Assassination Classroom, Shion in That Time I Got Reincarnated as a Slime, Roxy Migurdia in Mushoku Tensei: Jobless Reincarnation, and Yamato in One Piece.

== Personal life ==
Rojas married former Funimation social media manager Justin Rojas. Rojas has a son. She is non-binary and uses she/her and they/them pronouns.

== Filmography ==
=== Anime ===
List of dubbing performances in anime
Year	Series	Role	Notes	Source
2011	Fairy Tail	Mini (Gemini), Gogotora, Seilah		
2013	Good Luck Girl!	Akane Tenge		
2013	Guilty Crown	Brush	Ep. 15	
2013	Haganai	Mizuki, Hirasawa		
2013–present	One Piece	Gonbe, Nerine, Yamato	Funimation dub	
2013	Tenchi Muyo! War on Geminar	Wreda		
2014–present	Date A Live series	Tohka Yatogami		
2014	Kamisama Kiss	Megumi Tobita		
2014	Psycho-Pass	Kaori Minase		
2014	Red Data Girl	Hasegawa		
2015	Absolute Duo	Imari Nagakura		
2015	Assassination Classroom	Toka Yada	also Koro-sensei Q!	
2015	Nobunagun	Suguri		
2015	Noragami Aragoto	Aiha		
2015	Overlord	CZ2128 Delta		
2015	Riddle Story of Devil	Suzu Shuto		
2015	The Rolling Girls	Akaru		
2015	Tokyo Ghoul √A	Nashiro Yasuhisa		
2015	Tokyo Ravens	Dassai		
2015	World Break: Aria of Curse for a Holy Swordsman	Kyoko Takanashi		
2016	All Out!!	Kenji Gion (Young)		
2016	Divine Gate	Kay		
2016	Gonna be the Twin-Tail!!	Mikoto Sakuragawa		
2016	Keijo!!!!!!!!	Mio Kusakai		
2016	Kiss Him, Not Me	Shima Nishina		
2016	Love Live! Sunshine!!	Kanan Matsuura		
2016–17	New Game!	Kō Yagami		
2016	Servamp	Hugh the Dark Algernon III		
2016	Shōnen Maid	Chiyo Komiya		
2016	Show by Rock!!	Wendy		
2016	Sky Wizards Academy	Coela Viper		
2016	Three Leaves, Three Colors	Hiyori Ichiyanagi	Ep. 12	
2016	Tokyo ESP	Mami Izumi		
2016	The Vision of Escaflowne	Naria	Funimation dub	
2016	Castle Town Dandelion	Kanade Sakurada		
2016	Chaos Dragon	Lou Zhenhua		
2017	Aria the Scarlet Ammo AA	Tō Suimitsu		
2017	Chain Chronicle: The Light of Haecceitas	Fatima		
2017–present	Classroom of the Elite	Maya Sato		
2017	Code Geass: Akito the Exiled	Caretaker of Spacetime		
2017	ēlDLIVE	Mimi Kokonose		
2017	Hina Logi ~from Luck & Logic~	Karin Kiritani		
2017	In Another World With My Smartphone	Yae Kokonoe		
2017	Interviews with Monster Girls	Atsumi Imori		
2017	KanColle: Kantai Collection	Hiryū		
2017	Rio: Rainbow Gate!	Dana		
2017	Tsuredure Children	Kazuko Hosokawa		
2017	Gosick	Mildred Arbogast	Eps. 6-8, 14	
2018	Junji Ito Collection	Rina	Ep. 4	
2018	Yamada-kun and the Seven Witches	Meiko Ōtsuka		
2018	High School DxD: Hero	Misla Bael		
2018–present	That Time I Got Reincarnated as a Slime	Shion	Funimation dub	
2018	A Certain Magical Index III	Bayloupe		
2018	Cardcaptor Sakura: Clear Card	Sonomi Daidoji	Ep. 7	
2019	Boogiepop and Others	Boogiepop, Touka, Additional Voices	15 episodes	
2019	Azur Lane	Zuikaku		
2020	Grisaia: Phantom Trigger	Maki Inohara		
2020	Higurashi When They Cry	Mion Sonozaki, Shion Sonozaki	ADR Director	
2020	Fly Me to the Moon	Aurora		
2021	Wonder Egg Priority	Momoe		
2021	How a Realist Hero Rebuilt the Kingdom	Jeanne Euphoria		
2021	Takt Op. Destiny	Charlotte Schneider		
2021	Magatsu Wahrheit Zuerst		Assistant ADR Director/Co-Producer	
2021	Otherside Picnic	Natsumi Ichikawa	ADR Director, Producer	
2022	Seirei Gensouki: Spirit Chronicles	Dryas		
2022	Girls' Frontline	M16A1		
2022	The Genius Prince's Guide to Raising a Nation Out of Debt	Ninym Ralei		
2022	Trapped in a Dating Sim: The World of Otome Games Is Tough for Mobs	Luce		
2022	Shikimori's Not Just a Cutie	Kyou Nekozaki		
2022	Spy × Family	Ewen Egeburg		
2022	The Slime Diaries: That Time I Got Reincarnated as a Slime	Shion		
2022	Sing "Yesterday" for Me	Shinako Morinome		
2022	PuraOre! Pride of Orange		Producer	
2023	The Legendary Hero Is Dead!	Anri		
2023	Dr. Stone	Francois		
2024	Solo Leveling	Cha Hae-in		
2024	Natsume's Book of Friends	Kibune		
2026	In the Clear Moonlit Dusk	Yoi		

=== Animation ===
List of voice performances in animation
Year	Series	Role	Notes	Source
2021	Heaven Official's Blessing	Xuan Ji	Chinese donghua English dub	
2022	Link Click	Mr. Zhu's Girlfriend	Chinese donghua English dub	

=== Film ===
List of dubbing performances in anime Films
Year	Series	Role	Notes	Source
2015	Dragon Ball Z: Resurrection 'F'	Female Receptionist		
2016	Psycho-Pass: The Movie	Kaori Minase		
2019	City Hunter Shinjuku Private Eyes	Miki		
2021	My Hero Academia: World Heroes' Mission	Beros, Roro Soul		
2022	Sing a Bit of Harmony	Masuda		

=== Video games ===
List of voice performances in video games
Year	Title	Role	Notes	Source
2011	Planet Stronghold	Lisa Nelson		
2012	Loren The Amazon Princess	Chambara		
2012	Heroes of Newerth	Lust		
2013	Azada: Elementa	Air Mage		
2013	Princess Battles	Olivia		
2016	Dragon Ball Xenoverse 2	Time Patroller		
2021	Project Mikhail: A Muv-Luv War Story	Touko Kazama, Misae Munakata, Surface Pilot 3	Early Access release	
2025	Rune Factory: Guardians of Azuma	Zaza		

== Studio Nano ==
Rojas owns a recording studio, Studio Nano based in Irving with a branch based in Los Angeles. Studio Nano's major clients are Crunchyroll LLC, Rooster Teeth and Toei Animation Inc.

=== Works ===
- Girlfriend, Girlfriend (Crunchyroll)
- Higurashi: When They Cry – SOTSU (Funimation/Crunchyroll)
- Kaguya-sama: Love is War (Aniplex of America)
- Love Live! Superstar!! (Funimation/Crunchyroll)
- PuraOre! Pride of Orange (Crunchyroll)
