= Micah Solusod =

American voice actor

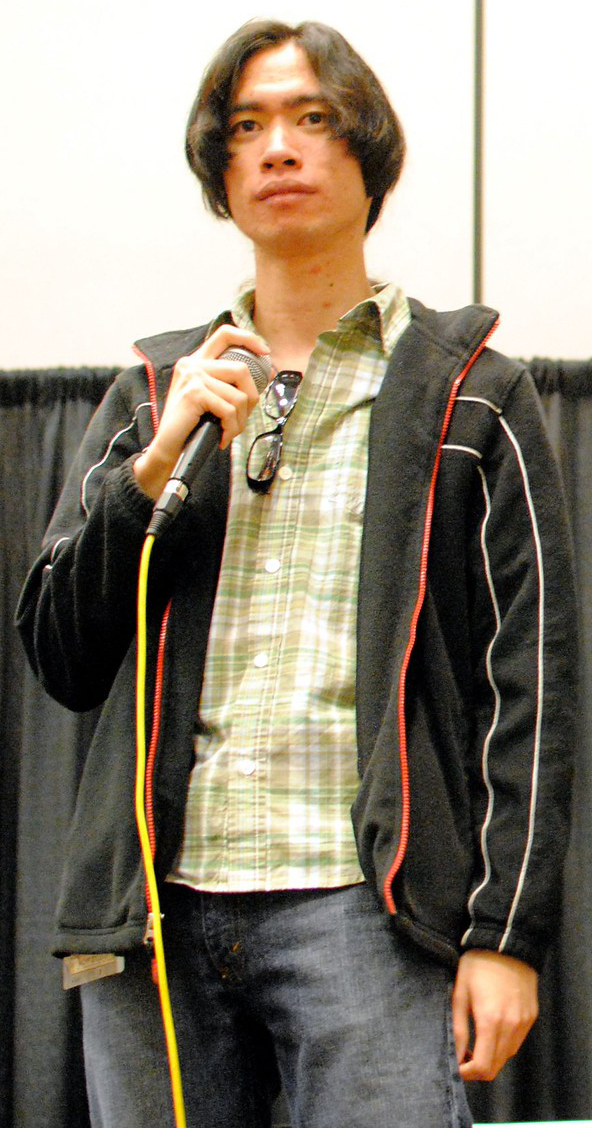
- Solusod in 2012
- Occupation: Voice actor
- Years active: 2009–present
- Spouse: Apphia Yu (m. 2016)
- Website: www.micahsolusod.com

Micah Solusod is an American voice actor. His best-known role in anime has been the title character Soul Evans in Soul Eater, which was broadcast on Adult Swim's programming block Toonami. He is also known for his role as Ao Fukai in the anime series Eureka Seven AO, alongside fellow voice actor Brandon Potter, who also plays Gazelle in the same series. He debuted as Malek Yildrim Werner in Blassreiter, and later went on to play Toma Kamijo in A Certain Magical Index, Yuichiro Hyakuya in Seraph of the End, Yuno Grinberryall in Black Clover, and Yuri Plisetsky in Yuri on Ice.

== Personal life ==
Outside of voice acting, Solusod is a freelance artist, where he posts on DeviantArt. He also works on original web comic series called Ties That Bind.

Solusod married voice actress Apphia Yu in 2016.

He is of Japanese and Filipino descent.

== Filmography ==
=== Anime ===
List of dubbing performances in anime
Year	Series	Role	Notes	Source
2008	Sands of Destruction	Reve Urshela		
2009	Blassreiter	Malek Werner		Resume
2009	Sgt. Frog	Chief, Minemine		Resume
2010–2015	Soul Eater	Soul Eater Evans	also Soul Eater Not!	
2010	Corpse Princess	Hiroshige Ushijima		Resume
2010	Birdy the Mighty: Decode	Tsutomu Senkawa		
2011	Tsubasa Tokyo Revelations	Kamui, Subaru		
2011	Chrome Shelled Regios	Loi Entorio		Resume
2011	Rideback	Haruki Hishida		
2011	Baka and Test series	Genji Hiraga		Resume
2011–2019	Fairy Tail	Midnight		Website
2012	Ōkami-san and her Seven Companions	List Kiriki		
2012	Black Butler II	Thomas Wallis		Resume
2012	The Legend of the Legendary Heroes	Tony		Resume
2012	Shiki	Takami		Resume
2012	Tales of Vesperia: The First Strike	Pete		Resume
2012	Shangri-La	Shion Imaki		Resume
2012	Level E	Yukitaka Tsutsui		
2012–2014; 2018–2019	A Certain Magical Index series	Toma Kamijo	also seasons 2-3	
2013–2014	A Certain Scientific Railgun series	Toma Kamijo		
2013	Darker than Black: Gemini of the Meteor	Nika Lobanov		Resume
2013	Eureka Seven AO	Ao Fukai		
2013	Guilty Crown	Gai Tsutsugami		
2014	Last Exile: Fam, the Silver Wing	Claus Valca		
2014	Space Dandy	Bea		
2014–2015	Kamisama Kiss series	Mizuki		Website
2014	Attack on Titan	Boris Feulner		
2014	Jormungand series	Jonah Mar		
2014	Red Data Girl	Miyuki Sagara		
2014	Code:Breaker	Rei Ogami		
2014	Laughing Under the Clouds	Hirari Abeno		
2015	Death Parade	Shigeru Miura		
2015	Assassination Classroom	Gakushu Asano	also Koro-sensei Q! in 2017	
2015	Yona of the Dawn	Su-Won		
2015	D-Frag!	Hachi Shio		
2015	Blood Blockade Battlefront	Black		Tweet
2015	Ninja Slayer From Animation	Albatross	Ep. 19	Tweet
2015	Show by Rock!! series	Riku		
2015	Mikagura School Suite	Yūto Akama		
2015	Ping Pong: The Animation	Makoto "Smile" Tsukimoto		
2015	Free! – Eternal Summer	Kazuki Minami		
2015	Noragami series	Yukine	2 seasons	
2015	Gangsta	Nico (Child)		Tweet
2015	Tokyo Ghoul series	Seido Takizawa	also root A	Tweet
2015	Heavy Object	Havia Winchell		
2015–2016	Seraph of the End	Yuichiro Hyakuya		
2015–2016	Selector Infected WIXOSS series	Kazuki Kurebayashi		
2016	Snow White with the Red Hair	Atri		
2016	Prince of Stride: Alternative	Ayumu Kadowaki		
2016	Divine Gate	Surtr		
2016	Brothers Conflict	Tsubaki Asahina		
2016	Rage of Bahamut: Genesis	Michael		Tweet
2016	Puzzle & Dragons X	Torlie		Tweet
2016	The Heroic Legend of Arslan: Dust Storm Dance	Jimsa	season 2	Tweet
2016	D.Gray-man Hallow	Kie, Wisely		
2016	The Disastrous Life of Saiki K.	Shun Kaidou		
2016	Handa-kun	Junichi Aizawa		
2016	Monster Hunter Stories: Ride On	Genie		Website
2016	Orange	Kakeru Naruse		
2016	Yuri!!! on Ice	Yuri "Yurio" Plisetsky		
2016	Drifters	Mills		Tweet
2016	The Vision of Escaflowne	Dallet	Funimation dub	
2017	Dragon Ball Super	Tagoma, Haru		Website
2017	WorldEnd: What are you doing at the end of the world? Are you busy? Will you save us?	Willem Kmetsch		
2017	The Royal Tutor	Heine Wittgenstein		
2017	Code Geass: Akito the Exiled	Akito Hyuga		
2017	Saiyuki Reload Blast	Cho Hakkai		
2017	Code: Realize − Guardian of Rebirth	Victor Frankenstein		
2017	ReLIFE	Arata Kaizaki		
2017	Black Clover	Yuno		
2017	Myriad Colors Phantom World	Haruhiko Ichijo		
2017–2025	My Hero Academia	Best Jeanist		
2017	Restaurant to Another World	Alexander	Ep. 5	
2018	Cardcaptor Sakura: Clear Card	Eriol Hiiragizawa		
2018	Double Decker: Doug and Kiril	Kiril Vrubell		
2019	Kochoki: Wakaki Nobunaga	Souon Takugen		
2019–2021	Fruits Basket	Naohito Sakuragi	Funimation dub	
2022	PuraOre! Pride of Orange	Ryoma Nakayama		
2024	That Time I Got Reincarnated as a Slime Season 3	Masayuki Honjou		
2025	Beyblade X	Cleo Cle		
2026	Fate/strange Fake	Faldeus Dioland		
2026	Dark Moon: The Blood Altar	Kamil		

=== Animation ===
List of voice performances in animation
Year	Series	Role	Notes	Source
2014	TOME: Terrain of Magical Expertise	Archy	3 episodes	

=== Films ===
List of voice performances in feature films
Year	Title	Role	Notes	Source
2015	Dragon Ball Z: Resurrection 'F'	Tagoma	limited theatrical release	
2017	Shin Godzilla	Yusuke Shimura		
2019	One Piece: Stampede	Koby	limited theatrical release	
2022	One Piece Film: Red	Koby	limited theatrical release	

List of voice performances in direct-to-video and television films
Year	Title	Role	Notes	Source
2012	Fafner: Heaven and Earth	Kazuki Makabe		
2013	Wolf Children	Ame		Website
2014	One Piece Film: Z	Koby		
2016	The Empire of Corpses	Nikolai Krasotkin		

=== Video games ===
List of voice performances in video games
Year	Title	Role	Notes	Source
2010	Jisei	Naoki Mizutani		Resume
2011	Kansei: The Second Turn	Naoki Mizutani		Resume
2011	Centipede: Infestation	Max		Resume
2014	Borderlands: The Pre-Sequel!	AK-5 Pilot, Dean the Hothead, Engineer Dockett		
2014	Loren The Amazon Princess	Draco		
2015	Dragon Ball Xenoverse	Time Patroller		
2016	Backstage Pass	Adam Eaton	visual novel by sakevisual	
2016	Dragon Ball Xenoverse 2	Time Patroller		
2018	Edge Of Eternity	Daryon		
2018	Dragon Ball Legends	Saiyan in Red/Giblet		
2021	Tales of Luminaria	Lucien Dufaure		
2023	Fire Emblem Engage	Alcryst		
2024	Ys X: Nordics	Cruz Carpent		
2024	Zenless Zone Zero	Asaba Harumasa		
