= Monster Hunter Stories: Ride On =

Japanese anime television series

- Main visual

モンスターハンター ストーリーズ RIDE ON(ライドオン) (Monsutā Hantā Sutōrīzu Raido On)
- Genre: Fantasy
- Anime television series
- Directed by: Mitsuru Hongo
- Produced by: Yuka Okayasu
- Written by: Natsuko Takahashi
- Music by: Masaru Yokoyama
- Studio: David Production
- Licensed by: NA: Crunchyroll
- Original network: FNS (Fuji TV)
- English network: US: Crunchyroll Channel
- Original run: October 2, 2016 – April 1, 2018
- Episodes: 75

Monster Hunter Stories: Ride On (Japanese: モンスターハンター ストーリーズ RIDE ON(ライドオン), Hepburn: Monsutā Hantā Sutōrīzu Raido On) is a 2016 Japanese anime television series based on Capcom's Monster Hunter action RPG series, specifically the spin-off entry Monster Hunter Stories. The series is produced by David Production, directed by Mitsuru Hongo and written by Natsuko Takahashi, featuring character designs by Takuya Saito and music by Masaru Yokoyama. It began airing on Fuji TV on October 2, 2016.

== Plot ==
Lute and his friends Cheval, Lilia, and Navirou live in Hakum Village, where chosen children learn to be Riders. Riders form a bond with friendly monsters called Monsties hatched from eggs, riding them as mounts for travel and combat. Due to monster riding being a taboo skill in a society filled with monster hunters, Hakum Village is isolated from the outside world and keeps its riding tradition a secret to all but a few privileged individuals. As Lute adventures with his friends and learns more about monster riding, a past threat remerges called the Dark Blight, infecting the nearby forest and leading to more aggressive monster attacks. A new generation of riders now has to find a way to stop the blighted monsters without having to destroy them outright.

== Characters ==
Lute (リュート, Ryūto)
Voiced by: Mutsumi Tamura (Japanese); Brittney Karbowski (English)
A young boy who aims to be the best monster rider who was brought to Hakum Village after his parents' death. Unlike the other riders, he formed kinship with a Rathalos he found himself instead of one given to him by the village.
Navirou (ナビルー, Nabirū)
Voiced by: M.A.O (Japanese); Trina Nishimura (English)
A peculiar and egotistical Airou who accidentally stumbled across Hakum Village one day and never left. He's known for his poor direction skills, odd behavior, and love of donuts.
Lilia (リリア, Riria)
Voiced by: Minami Takahashi (Japanese); Kate Oxley (English)
One of Lute's best friends known for her experimental item combinations. She originally intended to become a rider like Lute and Cheval but decided against it in favor of exploring the outside world in her future.
Cheval (シュヴァル, Shuvaru)
Voiced by: Ryōta Ōsaka (Japanese); Joel McDonald (English)
One of Lute's best friends, he's more quiet and reserved than Lute and Lilia. His Monsties are Rathian and Velocidrome.
Avinia (アユリア Ayuria)
Voiced by: Yui Makino (Japanese); Tia Ballard (English)
A mysterious loner Rider girl that Lute and Navirou come across after leaving Hakum Village. Her Monstie is a Barioth.
Mille (ミル, Miru)
Voiced by: Ayaka Asai (Japanese); Jad Saxton (English)
A rider with a direct attitude and the only girl in Lute's class. She often chides Hyoro.
Hyoro (ヒョロ)
Voiced by: Michiyo Murase (Japanese); Apphia Yu (English)
A less confident rider in Lute's class and the younger brother of Genie.
Chief Omna (オムナ村長, Omuna Sonchō)
Voiced by: Tetsuo Gotō (Japanese); Sonny Strait (English)
The chief of Hakum Village who also leads the kinship rite for riders.
Reverto (リヴェルト)
Voiced by: Tomokazu Sugita (Japanese); Robert McCollum (English)
A monster hunter that stumbles across Hakum Village.
Simone (シモーヌ, Shimōnu)
Voiced by: Nana Mizuki (Japanese); Colleen Clinkenbeard (English)
The captain of the Scriveners, a world-exploring research group.
Dan (ダン先輩, Dan-senpai)
Voiced by: Junichi Yanagita (Japanese); David Wald (English)
The teacher of the riders and trusted member of the Hakum Village community. He has an eager personality and a frequently used "top form" catchphrase. His monstie is Qurupeco.
Hyoro (ヒョロ)
Voiced by: Michiyo Murase (Japanese); Apphia Yu (English)
A less confident rider in Lute's class and the younger brother of Genie.
Genie (ジーニー, Jīnī)
Voiced by: Yuma Uchida (Japanese); Micah Solusod (English)
One of the older riders who assist Mr. Dan and Hyoro's older brother. His monstie is Yian Kut-Ku.
Stone (ストーン, Sutōn)
Voiced by: Itaru Yamamoto (Japanese); Cris George (English)
One of the older riders who assist Mr. Dan who helps lead teambuilding exercises.
Nole (ノール, Nōru)
Voiced by: Takanori Ōyama (Japanese); Ricco Fajardo (English)
One of the older riders who assist Mr. Dan. He's often seen protecting Hakum Village from outside monster threats. His monstie is Aptonoth.

== Broadcast ==
The series premiered on October 2, 2016, in Fuji TV's new daytime timeslot at 8:30 am, that runs on Sundays in Japan. It later premiered on UHB, OX, Tokai TV, KTV, OHK and TNC. The anime's first theme song, titled "Panorama", is performed by Kanjani∞. The series has been licensed in North America by Funimation. Crunchyroll is streaming a subtitled simulcast in some countries outside of Asia, while Funimation is streaming an English simuldub.

=== Season 1 ===
- Theme Song: Panorama
  - Artist: Kanjani∞
  - Episodes: 1-48

No.	Official English title (Note: All English titles are taken from Crunchyroll.) Original Japanese title	Original release date
1	"The Power of Bonds" "Kizuna no Chikara" (絆の力)	October 2, 2016
2	"A Monstie is Born!" / "A Companion Monster is Born!" "Otomon Tanjō!" (オトモン誕生！)	October 9, 2016
3	"Absolute Power" "Zettai Tsuwamono" (絶対強者)	October 16, 2016
4	"The Kinship Rite" "Kizuna Awase no Gishiki" (絆あわせの儀式)	October 23, 2016
5	"Off to the Monstie Races" / "The Companion Monster Race" "Otomon Rēsu" (オトモンレース)	October 30, 2016
6	"Quest for the Golden Egg" "Kin no Tamago Kuesuto" (金の卵クエスト)	November 6, 2016
7	"Like Mom Used to Make" "Dorinko wa Mama no Aji" (ドリンコはママの味)	November 13, 2016
8	"Navirou in Love" "Nabirū no Koi" (ナビルーの恋)	November 20, 2016
9	"DSZ (Dan and Silva's Zeal!)" "DSZ ~Dan to Shiruba no Zekkōchō!~" (DSZ～ダンとシルバのゼッコーチョー！～)	November 27, 2016
10	"Portent of Disaster" "Saiyaku no Yochō" (災厄の予兆)	December 4, 2016
11	"Before the Storm" "Arashi no Mae" (嵐の前)	December 11, 2016
12	"Invasion of the Nargacuga" "Narugakuruga Shūrai" (ナルガクルガ襲来)	December 18, 2016
13	"A Rathian is Born!" / "A Lioleia is Born!" "Rioreia Tanjō!" (リオレイア誕生！)	December 25, 2016
14	"Face the Black Blight!" "Tachimukae! Kuro no Kyōki!" (立ち向かえ！黒の凶気！)	January 8, 2017
15	"The Journey Begins" "Tabidachi no Hi" (旅立ちの日)	January 15, 2017
16	"Avinia's Secret" / "Ayuria's Secret" "Ayuria no Himitsu" (アユリアの秘密)	January 22, 2017
17	"Meet the Riddlemaster" "Nazonazo Jīsan Tōjō!" (なぞなぞじいさん登場！)	January 29, 2017
18	"Welcome to Gildegaran" "Tōchaku! Girudekaran" (到着！ギルデカラン)	February 5, 2017
19	"Nerscylla Blitz!" "Kyūshū! Nerusukyura" (急襲！ネルスキュラ)	February 12, 2017
20	"The Legend of Pawpad Place" "Nikukyū Mura no Densetsu" (ニクキュー村の伝説)	February 19, 2017
21	"Barroth, Landslide Wyvern" / "Bolboros, Landslide Wyvern" ""Dosha Ryū Boruborosu!!" (土砂竜ボルボロス!!)	February 26, 2017
22	"Desert Mayday" "Sabaku kara no Kyūen Irai" (砂漠からの救援依頼)	March 5, 2017
23	"The Horned Wyvern's Lament" "Tsunoryū Dōkoku" (角竜慟哭)	March 12, 2017
24	"Sky Wyvern, Land Wyvern" "Sora no Hiryū, Riku no Hiryū" (空の飛竜、陸の飛竜)	March 19, 2017
25	"Diabolical Diablos, Horned Wyvern" / "Death Battle! Diablos, Horned Wyvern" "Shitō! Tsunoryū Diaburosu!" (死闘！角竜ディアブロス！)	March 26, 2017
26	"The Mysterious White Dragon" "Nazo no Shiroi Ryū" (謎の白い竜)	April 2, 2017
27	"Dovan Volcano Memories" "Dovan Kazan no Kioku" (ドヴァン火山の記憶)	April 9, 2017
28	"Onward, Numbers!" "Susume! Nanbāzu!" (進め！ナンバーズ！)	April 16, 2017
29	"The Dragon in the Sea of Fire" "Hi no Umi ni Sumu Ryū" (火の海に棲む竜)	April 23, 2017
30	"Parting Ways" "Ketsubetsu no Toki" (決別の時)	April 30, 2017
31	"Be the Forest, Be the Beast" "Mori to Nari Kemono to Nare" (森となり獣となれ)	May 7, 2017
32	"All-Out Airborne Assault!" / "Lute Sinking? The Great Aerial Decisive Battle" "Ryūto Chinbotsu? Kūchū Daikessen!" (リュート沈没？空中大決戦！)	May 14, 2017
33	"The Wolf Raven Strikes Back" "Kokurōchō no Gyakushū" (黒狼鳥の逆襲)	May 21, 2017
34	"Rainbow Beach Blockade!" "Reinbō Bīchi o Fūsa Seyo!" (レインボービーチを封鎖せよ！)	May 28, 2017
35	"The White Dragon's Egg" "Shiroki Ryū no Tamago" (白き竜のタマゴ)	June 4, 2017
36	"The Great Manelger Chase" "Manerugā Hakase o Oe!" (マネルガー博士を追え！)	June 11, 2017
37	"Trouble Returns to Hakum" "Hakumu Mura no Kiki, Futatabi!" (ハクム村の危機、再び！)	June 18, 2017
38	"The Little Bouquet" "Chīsana Hanataba" (小さな花束)	June 25, 2017
39	"Tested at the Tower of Illusion" "Shiren! Shinkirō no Tō e" (試練！蜃気楼の塔へ)	July 2, 2017
40	"Brachydios the Destroyer" "Gekimetsu no Burakidiosu" (撃滅のブラキディオス)	July 9, 2017
41	"The Nargacuga Returns" "Narugakuruga Futatabi" (ナルガクルガ再び)	July 16, 2017
42	"Numbers, Assemble!" "Nanbāzu, Zenin Shūgō!" (ナンバーズ、全員集合！)	July 23, 2017
43	"Forest of Confusion" "Mayoi no Mori" (迷いの森)	July 30, 2017
44	"A Mystical Meeting with Kirin" "Makafushigi! Genjū Kirin to no Sōgū" (摩訶不思議！幻獣キリンとの遭遇)	August 6, 2017
45	"The Deviljho of Mt. Celion" / "The Violent Wyvern of Mt. Celion" "Serionzan no Kyōbōryū" (セリオン山の恐暴竜)	August 13, 2017
46	"The Legendary White Dragon Is Born!" "Tanjō! Densetsu no Shiroki Ryū" (誕生! 伝説の白き竜)	August 20, 2017
47	"This is it: The Black Dread" / "Decisive Battle! The Most-Evil Black" "Kessen! Saikyō no Kuro" (決戦! 最凶の黒)	August 27, 2017
48	"A Miracle in White" "Shiroi Kiseki" (白い奇跡)	September 3, 2017

=== Season 2 ===
- Theme Song: Bokura Kyou mo Ikiteiru
  - Artist: Johnny's West
  - Episodes: 49-75

No.	Official English title (Note: All English titles are taken from Crunchyroll.) Original Japanese title	Original release date
49	"Attack of the Ebon Riders!" "Shūrai! Burakku Raidāzu!" (襲来!ブラックライダーズ!)	September 17, 2017
50	"A Strong and Dangerous Man Shrouded in Mystery" "Tsuyokute abunai nazo no Yatsu" (強くて危ない謎の奴)	September 24, 2017
51	"The Biggest Narcissist Ever!? Mad Appears!" "Kūzenzetsugo no Narushisuto!? Maddo Kenzan!" (空前絶後のナルシスト!?マッド見参!)	October 1, 2017
52	"The Forest Ninja, Shadow Arrives!" "Mori no Ninja, Shadō Sanjō!" (森の忍者、シャドウ参上!)	October 8, 2017
53	"Hang in There, Velocidrome!" "Ganbare! Dosu Ranposu!" (がんばれ!ドスランポス)	October 15, 2017
54	"For Avinia!" "Ayuria no Tame ni!" (アユリアの為に!)	October 22, 2017
55	"The Bolt Rathalos" "Raikō no Reusu" (雷光のレウス)	October 29, 2017
56	"A Lukewarm Kinship" "Kūru de Hotto na Kizuna" (クールでホットな絆)	November 5, 2017
57	"It's Hard Being a Vice Captain" "Fukutaichō wa tsurai yo" (副隊長はつらいよ)	November 12, 2017
58	"Navirou's Great Fart Plan" "Nabirū Onara Daisakusen" (ナビルーおなら大作戦)	November 19, 2017
59	"Darkness and Kinship" "Yami to Kizuna to" (闇と絆と)	November 26, 2017
60	"Return of the Monstie Races!" "Otomon Rēsu, Futatabi!" (オトモンレース、再び!)	December 3, 2017
61	"The Revival of Doctor Manelger?" "Fukkatsu? Manerugā Hakasei!" (復活?マネルガー博士!)	December 10, 2017
62	"Lute vs. Gale Again!" "Ryūto VS Geiru Futatabi!" (リュートVSゲイル再び!)	December 17, 2017
63	"The Great Avinia Rescue Operation!" "Ayuria, Kyūshutsu Daisakusen!" (アユリア、救出大作戦!)	December 24, 2017
64	"New Year at Hakum Village" "Hakumu Mura no Shinnen" (ハクム村の新年)	January 7, 2018
65	"Bonds in Memories" "Kioku no naka no Kizuna" (記憶の中の絆)	January 14, 2018
66	"Two Shadows" "Ninnen no Shadou" (二人のシャドウ)	January 21, 2018
67	"Anvis' Plan" "Anvisu no Takurami" (アンヴィスの企み)	January 28, 2018
68	"Assault of the Steel Dragon!" "Kyōshū! Hagane no Ryū!" (強襲!鋼の龍)	February 4, 2018
69	"Debli the Spy" "Supai Deburi" (スパイデブリ)	February 11, 2018
70	"A Rider Called Anvis" "Anvisu toiu Raidā" (アンヴィスというライダー)	February 18, 2018
71	"Kushala Daora's Charge" "Kusharudaora no Shingeki" (クシャルダオラの進撃)	March 4, 2018
72	"Emergency Strategy Meeting" "Kotatsu bōei taisaku Kaigi" (古龍防衛対策会議)	March 11, 2018
73	"Arrival of the Steel Dragon" "Maioriru Kōryū" (舞い降りる鋼龍)	March 18, 2018
74	"Of Winds, Clouds, and a Song" "Kaze to kumo to uta to" (風と雲と歌と)	March 25, 2018
75	"Kinship" "Kizuna" (絆)	April 1, 2018
