= Heileen =

- Developer: Tycoon Games
- Publisher: Tycoon Games
- Engine: Ren'Py
- Platforms: iOS, Android, Linux, Mac OS, Windows
- Release: Heileen 1: October 21, 2008; Heileen 2; December 17, 2009; Voiced: March 19, 2010; Heileen 3; December 17, 2012
- Genre: Visual novel
- Mode: Single-player

Heileen is a visual novel video game series developed and published by the Italian studio Tycoon Games for the Android, Linux, MacOS, and Microsoft Windows. The first game Heileen: Sail Away (also known as Heileen: Sail to the New World or just Heileen) was released in 2008 and the sequel Heileen 2: The Hands of Fate in 2009. The final installment Heileen 3: New Horizons was released on December 17, 2012. A free online prequel with the title Heileen: A Trip to Bavaria was released in 2009.

== Gameplay ==
The player reads through the story and makes decisions at some points, which leads to different outcomes and one out of three possible endings. The player can also start a relationship with one of the other characters, including lesbian relationships. The game offers a quest system and gives them a score rating at the end of the game. The second game features 15 unique endings and an enhanced version of the original quest system in Heileen with 20 quests. The third game does not feature a quest system anymore and offers a new stat raising system instead.

== Heileen: A Trip To Bavaria ==
Heileen: A Trip To Bavaria tells the story of a trip Heileen did on her 16th birthday to a small village in Bavaria. There she met Magdalene and they became very good friends. Heileen's uncle Otto and Lora appear in the game, as well.

== Heileen: Sail Away ==
Heileen, a young 17th-century girl, goes on a voyage with her Uncle Otto to visit the new world, the Americas. She is accompanied by her best friend Marie and her Uncle's mistress, Lora. Based on the choices the player makes the game leads to one of three different endings. At the end, however, Heileen gets shipwrecked on a Caribbean island.

== Heileen 2: The Hands of Fate ==
Heileen 2: The Hands of Fate takes place on a mysterious Caribbean island where Heileen was shipwrecked at the end of the first game. Her ex-slave friends Robert and Ebele helped her survive, but when Heileen discovers a deck of tarot cards representing the seven deadly sins and the seven godly virtues, she realizes that the power of the cards can help her unlock the secrets of her past and shape her future. With the tarot cards, she can escape from the island, find her true love, meet pirates, or do nothing at all.

The voiced version of Heileen 2: The Hands of Fate was released in 2010. A team of seven voice actors worked on the game:

- Ayu Sakata – Ebele, Marie
- Steven Mane – Elias, Marco, Adam
- Lucien Dodge – Black, Morgan, Otto
- Morgan Barnhart – Lora, Juliet
- Erica Mendez – Magdalene, Marcus kid
- Dan Conlin – Robert, Jack, Additional Voices
- Mauri Majanoja – John, Jonathan

== Heileen 3: New Horizons ==
Heileen 3: New Horizons starts about five years after the events of the second game. It starts after Heileen and her friends are rescued by pirates and they offer their services to the pirates. The theme song New Horizons was written by Matthew Myers and is performed by Irulanne.

== Reception ==
On Steam, the three games in the series received mixed-to-positive user reviews. Heileen 1: Sail Away received mixed reception, with reviewers noting the short length and limited character development relative to other visual novels, while acknowledging its quest system as a distinguishing feature. Heileen 2: The Hands of Fate holds a Mixed rating based on 19 user reviews, with 57% positive. The third installment, Heileen 3: New Horizons, received the most positive reception of the trilogy, holding a Positive rating with 80% of 26 user reviews recommending it, with the Virtues/Sins stat-raising system praised as an improvement over the earlier quest format.
