= The Flower Shop =

- Developer: Winter Wolves
- Publisher: Winter Wolves
- Artist: M. Beatriz García
- Writer: Ayu Sakata
- Engine: Ren'Py
- Platforms: Android, iOS, Linux, Mac OS X, Microsoft Windows
- Release: February 1, 2010 & December 8, 2011
- Genre: Visual novel
- Mode: Single-player

The Flower Shop is a visual novel series by Winter Wolves. The first game The Flower Shop - Summer In Fairbrook was released on February 1, 2010, while the sequel The Flower Shop - Winter in Fairbrook was released on December 8, 2011. The games are for the Microsoft Windows, Mac OS X and Linux platforms. Both games were also released for Android and iOS.

== Gameplay ==
The game offers a mix of classic visual novel gameplay, with dialogues and many choices to make, with a farming minigame. In The Flower Shop - Summer in Fairbrook the player has to grow crops and sell them to get money. It is possible to use fertilizer to speed up the growing process. In The Flower Shop - Winter in Fairbrook the principle is the same, however, this time the player has to grow flowers. The games offer a gallery where the player can watch the achieved endings again. There are nine different endings in each of the games.

== Plot ==
=== The Flower Shop - Summer in Fairbrook ===
Steve, a college student, breaks up with his girlfriend and his dad is shipping him off to the farm of his uncle for the summer. There he has to take care of the farm and raise crops. The player can now decide how Steve should plan his week and start a romance with one of the four available girls. Depending on the choices the player makes, the ending will be different.

=== The Flower Shop - Winter in Fairbrook ===
Natalie just finished her first semester in college. Now her parents want her to get a job during her winter break. Natalie's roommate knows a job for her and she is sent to Fairbrook to work in a flower shop. The player can now decide how Natalie should plan her week and start a romance with one of the four available boys. Depending on the choices the player makes, the ending will be different.

== Characters ==
- Steve: The protagonist of Summer in Fairbrook. He is also one of the boys Natalie can date in Winter in Fairbrook. Steve is the stereotypical "city boy", and he is initially unused and estranged to the tranquil and lax lifestyle at the farm in Fairbrook. With the passing time though, he learns to adjust more. His character development from the first game is more evident in the sequel, though his attitude is roughly the same, minus the immaturity. It is shown in Winter that Steve still likes city foods such as pizza, but he can cook for himself now. There are some endings where Steve ends up with Clara should the player not pursue him as a love interest.
- Natalie: The protagonist of Winter in Fairbrook. She, like Steve from the first game, is a "city girl" who hates waking up early, is used to ordering pizza and take-outs for food, and is unused to rural life. However, she may even win over a love interest depending on the player's choices.
- Jill: Steve's ex-girlfriend. She is one of the girls Steve can date in Summer in Fairbrook. She wants to become a lawyer and strives hard for that goal. She feels that Steve needs to have some sense knocked into him, which is why she thinks Steve being sent to Fairbrook is a good idea. Jill is the only girl who does not appear in the sequel Winter in Fairbrook. Instead, it is implied that she pursued her studies abroad, therefore rendering her route as not canon to the sequel because Steve can be dated in Winter. It is also implied in certain endings of Winter in Fairbrook that she and Ryan meet abroad and gain an interest with one another.
- Clara: An athletic girl who loves the big city. She is one of the girls Steve can date in Summer in Fairbrook. She also appears briefly in the beginning of Winter in Fairbrook as Natalie's roommate. Clara is the one who suggests to Natalie that the latter work at Fairbrook over the winter break. In some endings, Clara is implied to be the one chosen by Steve (if Steve's path is not pursued) in Winter.
- Marian: The librarian. She is one of the girls Steve can date in Summer in Fairbrook. She aspires to become a great poet but her dwindling self-confidence more than often gets in the way. Her route in the first game focuses on Steve and Marian working together to help the librarian overcome her weakness. In Winter in Fairbrook, Marian is still a librarian at Fairbrook but is now also a recognized poet and distinguished judge at poem contests. Due to her busy schedule in the sequel, Trent (Susana's brother) is now her assistant at the library. If Trent is not chosen as a love interest in Winter, he and Marian will begin dating at the ending.
- Susana: She runs the titular Flower Shop. She is one of the girls Steve can date in Summer in Fairbrook. Susana is a kind and helpful soul, as evidenced by how kindly she treats not only the protagonists but also the entire village. She is the one who offers Natalie her job in Winter in Fairbrook. Though Susana is normally sweet and caring, she is easily riled by the mere mention of someone eating foods with preservatives or artificial additives due to (possibly) being a vegetarian. If Jacob is not chosen as a love interest in Winter, Susana will start noticing Jacob's affections for her at the ending.
- Trent: He is the older brother of Susana. He originally appears briefly in Summer as Susana's protective brother and as a helper in later parts of the first game. He is one of the boys Natalie can date in Winter in Fairbrook. He is loudmouthed and a little energetic, but he means very well. Trent has a not-so-secret crush on Marian, the librarian, who is the main reason why he helps out at the library. He, however, finds a kindred spirit in his enthusiasm with Natalie. If he is not chosen as a love interest in Winter, Trent and Marian will begin dating.
- Ryan: He runs the general store. He is one of the boys Natalie can date in Winter in Fairbrook. Exclusively in Winter, Ryan is a calculative person. He appears brooding and cold at first, but it becomes quickly apparent that his facade is a just a result of poor communication skills. His route begins when Natalie, who wants someone to tutor her in school, asks for Ryan's assistance (who is a professional tutor) in Math. In exchange for help at schoolwork, Natalie will help Ryan overcome his shyness and lack of social skills. If Ryan is not chosen as a love interest Winter, he will go abroad to study. Certain endings imply that he meets a girl studying law abroad (heavily implied to be Jill, Steve's ex-girlfriend) and they find an interest in each other.
- Jacob: He is helping out Clara's father. He is one of the boys Natalie can date in Winter in Fairbrook. In Summer in Fairbrook, Jacob is a young man helping out at Clara's family farm. In the first game, he has a one-sided crush on Clara, the farmer's daughter, which Steve immediately picks up on. He appears as the most childish of the cast, something which bothers him deeply. In Winter, his crush is transferred to Susana, the flower shop owner. Here, Jacob is more bothered about the fact that despite he tries his best at work, people around him still seem to treat him like a child. His route focuses on Natalie proving to Jacob that he doesn't have anything to worry about. If Jacob is not chosen as a love interest in Winter, Susana will begin to realize and return Jacob's affections for her.

== Development ==
The games were created with Ren'Py. Winter Wolves also released free demos of the games on their website. Winter Wolves and sakevisual hinted at the possibility that a crossover between the series and the Jisei series might be possible in the future; the working title is Jisei in Fairbrook.

== Reception ==
The first game received a score of 85/100 on Gamertell, with reviewer Jenni Lada writing "It moves at a good pace, has the farming aspect to add variety and keep it from only being about reading and picking choices and is pleasant to look at and listen to." Mac Games gave 3,5 of 5 stars to the first game and wrote: "It appears this game is aimed towards young girls, but I think you should try it even if you do not fall in that category. The music is muted and appropriate, and the anime characters well done." The sequel received a score of 83/100 on Gamertell, with reviewer Jenni Lada writing "It moves at a good pace, has the farming aspect to add variety and keep it from only being about reading and picking choices and is pleasant to look at and listen to."
