= Celso Riva =

Italian video game designer

Celso Riva (born c. 1974) is an Italian independent video game designer of several critically acclaimed games, including The Goalkeeper, Universal Boxing Manager, Magic Stones, the Heileen and Vera Blanc series, Bionic Heart, and the Loren the Amazon Princess.

== Life and game design career ==
At the age of twenty, Riva began his career, designing small-scale games for the Italian market. He took a seven-year sabbatical until 2003, when he discovered the shareware distribution model and created the sports management video game Universal Soccer Manager using BlitzBasic.

He moved to C/C++ language and published 10 more games under the Winter Wolves label, then opened a new company, Tycoon Games, on which he has published 6 games: the space war game Supernova 2: Spacewar, the dating sim game Summer Session, the visual novels Heileen and Bionic Heart, College Romance: Rise Of The Little Brother, and Spirited Heart. For the games Summer Session and Heileen, he moved away from C/C++ to embrace Python programming language and in particular the tool Ren'Py.

The stories of The Flower Shop: Summer In Fairbrook and The Flower Shop: Winter in Fairbrook were written by Ayu Sakata from sakevisual. Starting from 2020, some of his games were ported and published to consoles by Ratalaika Games.

== Awards ==
In 2004, both his games The Goalkeeper and Universal Boxing Manager were nominated among the 5 top Sports Games of the Year by the online magazine Gametunnel. In the 2011 Best Ofs from VNs Now!, Winter Wolves was named "Studio/EVN Circle of the Year".

== Games ==
| Release date | Title(s) | Genre(s) | Platform(s) |
|---|---|---|---|
| 2003 | Universal Soccer Manager | Sports management | Mac OS, Microsoft Windows |
| 2004 | Spin Around | Puzzle game | Mac OS, Microsoft Windows |
| 2004 | Ignazio The Frog | Pac-Man clone | Mac OS, Microsoft Windows |
| 2004 | Universal Boxing Manager | Sports management | Mac OS, Microsoft Windows |
| 2004 | Quizland | Quiz game | Mac OS, Microsoft Windows |
| 2004 | The Goalkeeper | Simulation video game | Mac OS, Microsoft Windows |
| 2004 | Supernova: Galactic Wars | Strategy video game | Mac OS, Microsoft Windows |
| 2005 | Magic Stones | Card game, Role-playing video game | Mac OS, Microsoft Windows |
| 2006 | Universal Soccer Manager 2 | Sports management | Mac OS, Microsoft Windows |
| 2007 | TV Station Manager | Simulation video game | Mac OS, Microsoft Windows |
| 2008 | Supernova 2: Spacewar | Strategy video game | Mac OS, Microsoft Windows |
| 2008 | Summer Session | Visual novel, dating sim | Linux, Mac OS, Microsoft Windows |
| 2008 | Heileen: Sail Away | Visual novel, dating sim | Android, iOS, Linux, Mac OS, Microsoft Windows |
| 2009 | College Romance: Rise Of The Little Brother | Visual novel, dating sim | Linux, Mac OS, Microsoft Windows |
| 2009 | Spirited Heart | Visual novel, dating sim | Android, iOS, Linux, Mac OS, Microsoft Windows |
| 2009 | Bionic Heart | Visual novel | Android, iOS, Linux, Mac OS, Microsoft Windows |
| 2009 | Heileen 2: The Hands of Fate | Visual novel, dating sim | Android, iOS, Linux, Mac OS, Microsoft Windows |
| 2010 | Card Sweethearts | Card game | Linux, Mac OS, Microsoft Windows |
| 2010 | The Flower Shop - Summer In Fairbrook | Visual novel, dating sim | Android, iOS, Linux, Mac OS, Microsoft Windows |
| 2010 | Vera Blanc: Full Moon | Visual novel, detective game | Android, iOS, Linux, Mac OS, Microsoft Windows, Nintendo Switch, PlayStation 4, Xbox One |
| 2010 | Vera Blanc: Ghost In The Castle | Visual novel, detective game | Android, iOS, Linux, Mac OS, Microsoft Windows, Nintendo Switch, PlayStation 4, Xbox One |
| 2011 | Love & Order with Christine Love | Visual novel, dating sim | Android, iOS, Linux, Mac OS, Microsoft Windows |
| 2011 | Planet Stronghold | Role-playing video game, visual novel | Android, iOS, Linux, Mac OS, Microsoft Windows |
| 2011 | Always Remember Me | Visual novel, dating sim | Android, iOS, Linux, Mac OS, Microsoft Windows |
| 2011 | Spirited Heart Girl's Love | Expansion | Android, iOS, Linux, Mac OS, Microsoft Windows |
| 2011 | The Flower Shop - Winter In Fairbrook | Visual novel, dating sim | Android, iOS, Linux, Mac OS, Microsoft Windows |
| 2012 | Loren The Amazon Princess | Role-playing video game, visual novel | Android, iOS, Linux, Mac OS, Microsoft Windows |
| 2012 | Loren The Amazon Princess: The Castle of N'mar | Expansion | Android, iOS, Linux, Mac OS, Microsoft Windows |
| 2012 | Heileen 3: New Horizons | Visual novel, dating sim | Android, iOS, Linux, Mac OS, Microsoft Windows |
| 2013 | Heileen 3: Sea Maidens | Expansion | Android, iOS, Linux, Mac OS, Microsoft Windows |
| 2013 | Bionic Heart 2 | Visual novel, dating sim | Android, iOS, Linux, Mac OS, Microsoft Windows |
| 2013 | Nicole | Visual novel, dating sim | Android, iOS, Linux, Mac OS, Microsoft Windows, Nintendo Switch, PlayStation 4, Xbox One |
| 2014 | Roommates | Visual novel, dating sim | Android, iOS, Linux, Mac OS, Microsoft Windows, Nintendo Switch, PlayStation 4, Xbox One |
| 2014 | Tales of Aravorn: Seasons of the Wolf | Role-playing-game, visual novel | Android, iOS, Linux, Mac OS, Microsoft Windows |
| 2015 | Bad Blood | Expansion | Android, iOS, Linux, Mac OS, Microsoft Windows |
| 2016 | Planet Stronghold: Colonial Defense | Visual novel, card game video game | Android, Linux, Mac OS, Microsoft Windows |
| 2016 | C14 Dating | Visual novel, dating sim | Android, iOS, Linux, Mac OS, Microsoft Windows, Nintendo Switch, PlayStation 4, PlayStation 5, Xbox One, Xbox Series X/S |
| 2016 | Heirs And Graces | Visual novel, dating sim | Android, iOS, Linux, Mac OS, Microsoft Windows |
| 2016 | Queen of Thieves | Visual novel, dating sim | Android, iOS, Linux, Mac OS, Microsoft Windows |
| 2016 | Never Forget Me | Visual novel, dating sim | Android, iOS, Linux, Mac OS, Microsoft Windows |
| 2017 | Amber's Magic Shop | Visual novel, dating sim | Android, iOS, Linux, Mac OS, Microsoft Windows |
| 2018 | Cursed Lands | Role-playing video game | Android, iOS, Linux, Mac OS, Microsoft Windows |
| 2018 | Love Bites | Visual novel, dating sim | Android, iOS, Linux, Mac OS, Microsoft Windows |
| 2019 | Corona Borealis | Visual novel, dating sim | Linux, Mac OS, Microsoft Windows |
| 2020 | Planet Stronghold 2 | Role-playing video game, visual novel | Linux, Microsoft Windows |
| 2020 | Volleyball Heaven | Visual novel, dating sim | Linux, Microsoft Windows |
| 2021 | Tales From The Under-Realm: Hazel | Visual novel | Linux, Microsoft Windows |
| 2021 | At Your Feet | Visual novel, dating sim | Linux, Microsoft Windows |
| 2021 | Summer In Trigue | Visual novel, dating sim | Linux, Microsoft Windows |
| 2021 | Love Notes | Visual novel, dating sim | Linux, Microsoft Windows |
| 2022 | The Curse Of Mantras | Card game, role-playing video game | Linux, Microsoft Windows |
| 2022 | Tales From The Under-Realm: After Midnight | Visual novel | Linux, Microsoft Windows |
| 2023 | The Beastmaster Princess | Visual novel | Linux, Microsoft Windows |
| 2023 | Save The World | Visual novel | Linux, Microsoft Windows |
| 2023 | Tales Of Aravorn: An Elven Marriage | Role-playing video game, visual novel | Linux, Microsoft Windows |
