= Tales of Aravorn: Seasons of the Wolf =

2014 video game

- Developer(s): Winter Wolves
- Publisher(s): Winter Wolves
- Composer(s): Matthew Myers
- Engine: Ren'Py
- Platform(s): Android, iOS, Linux, Mac OS, Microsoft Windows, Nintendo Switch
- Release: Android, iOS, Linux, Mac OS, Microsoft Windows; November 15, 2014; Nintendo Switch; June 17, 2022
- Genre(s): RPG, Visual Novel
- Mode(s): Single-player

Tales of Aravorn: Seasons of the Wolf is a role-playing visual novel by Italian studio Winter Wolves. The game was released on November 15, 2014, and is a spin-off of Loren The Amazon Princess, which is set in the same universe. The game works for the Android, iOS, Linux, Mac OS, Microsoft Windows, and Nintendo Switch platforms.

== Gameplay ==
Similar to Loren The Amazon Princess, the game offers a mix of classic visual novel gameplay, with role-playing elements. The player reads through the story and occasionally has to fight against monsters. At the beginning the player can choose between a male and a female elven protagonist. It offers a variety of romance options with the party members, including same-sex relationships, and has different endings, based on the choices of the player and the relationships.

Battles can take place between the player's party and a party of enemies, with a maximum of six characters on each side. Each party consists of a front row, that is typically occupied by warrior type characters and can be attacked by anyone, and a back row, which typically holds weaker ranged and magical characters, that melee characters can only attack if the front row is unoccupied, in which case all on the back row will be forced to the front. Characters are able to swap places with others, or can move into unoccupied spaces on their turn, and warriors can gain the ability to force a character to swap with the one behind them.

Characters take it in turns to attack, with their speed, as well as the moves they use, determining how long they must wait. When a character's turn comes up, they have the choice of either attacking an enemy with their equipped weapon or abilities, using an ability to support the party, using an item for either healing or offense, or switching places. Should everyone in the player's party be killed, the player can reload a previous save. The player does not have the option of fleeing a battle, but should they win, the health and MP of all characters will be completely refilled, except at certain points of the story. As the player gains more followers, exceeding the maximum number of people they can have in a battle, they can reorganise the battle group outside of battles.

== Plot ==
Following Althea and Shea, the game plays over the course of the four seasons. They travel along with others from the ice-shrouded town of Ninim to the desert-wrapped city of Dingirra to the storm-shrouded port of Shacklesplit.

== Development and release ==
Tales of Aravorn: Seasons of the Wolf was created with Ren'Py. It features a theme song by Boossara, composed by Matthew Myers. The original idea and the storyboard was invented by Celso Riva, while the writing was done by Götz Heinrich. The art was done by Shiver M., Slamet Mujono, Sheryn Ng, Stéphan Lemineur, Peter Petkov, and Therese M. Yucamco. Kevin Greenlee composed the original soundtrack, while Ayu Sakata was responsible for the battle voice production.

A downloadable content (DLC) expansion Bad Blood was released in 2015. It includes additional story content after the end of the base game and continues the plot. Furthermore, the DLC includes new scenes that are unlocked based on whom the player romanced.

== Reception ==
RPGamer gave a rating of 3.0 of 5 points to the game and wrote: "If forced to choose between Seasons of the Wolf and its predecessor, then Loren The Amazon Princess would get the nod purely for its more rewarding overall storyline and larger set of intriguing characters. However, Seasons of the Wolf provides a decent follow-up, and those who have enjoyed Winter Wolves' previous excursions or other visual novels should find it well worth the fifteen to twenty hours it takes to get through."
