= Shōnen Maid =

Japanese manga and anime series

- The cover of the first manga volume.

少年メイド (Shōnen Meido)
- Genre: Comedy
- Manga
- Written by: Ototachibana
- Published by: Enterbrain
- Magazine: B's-Log Comic
- Original run: 12 March 2008 – 1 March 2017
- Volumes: 10
- Anime television series
- Directed by: Yusuke Yamamoto
- Written by: Yoshiko Nakamura
- Music by: Tomohiro Yamada
- Studio: Eight Bit
- Licensed by: AUS: Madman Entertainment; NA: Funimation
- Original network: TBS, CBC, Sun TV, BS-TBS, TBS Channel 1
- Original run: 8 April 2016 – 1 July 2016
- Episodes: 12

Shōnen Maid (少年メイド, Shōnen Meido; lit. 'Boy Maid') is a Japanese manga series written and illustrated by Ototachibana. A 12-episode anime television series adaptation aired between April and July 2016.

== Plot ==
After the tragic death of his mother, Chihiro Komiya, an orphaned fourth grader in elementary school, is left with no close relatives or even a place to live. This all changes when he meets Madoka Takatori, a wealthy but eccentric young man who is revealed to be his long lost uncle from his mother's side of the family; when Madoka noticed that Chihiro has nowhere else to go, he decides to take in the young boy to live with him. However, when Chihiro first sees his uncle's large mansion all messed up and filled with nothing but garbage (since it's always like that) he decides to employ himself as Madoka's official housekeeper while wearing a frilly maid uniform and getting paid with allowance every month.

== Characters ==
Chihiro Komiya (小宮 千尋, Komiya Chihiro)
Voiced by: Houko Kuwashima (drama CD) Natsumi Fujiwara (anime) (Japanese); Apphia Yu (English)
An elementary school student who begins working as a maid at his wealthy uncle's home after his mother dies. He is a clean freak and a terrific cook and can be strict but caring to his uncle. He is mature for his age, having been taught by his mother that those who don't work don't eat; he is also friendly and extremely independent for his age. He can be stubborn and has a short temper but means well. He is the type of person who would restrain himself and not ask for things he wanted since he grew up poor but has grown to rely and depend on his uncle. He is very intelligent, getting straight A's and has aspirations to be a hotel baron.
Madoka Takatori (鷹取 円, Takatori Madoka)
Voiced by: Takahiro Mizushima (drama CD) Nobunaga Shimazaki (anime) (Japanese); Seth Magill (English)
Chihiro's eccentric uncle, who makes costumes and takes him in on the condition that he take over the cleaning of the house. He tends to be lazy, easygoing and makes a huge mess, but cares for his nephew and is a genuinely kind and gentle person. He loves cats but is allergic to them and dislikes dogs due to a past childhood trauma. He is not good with strangers and not up to date with popular culture, particularly since he doesn't own a TV (though they eventually buy one). He is not picky about food and is good at baking sweets. He particularly loves frills and frilly clothing. Though he doesn't get along with his mother, Kazusa Takatori, due to a childhood experience, he realizes there's more to her.
Keiichirō Shinozaki (篠崎 桂一郎, Shinozaki Keiichirō)
Voiced by: Yoshimasa Hosoya (drama CD) Tomoaki Maeno (anime) (Japanese); Todd Haberkorn (English)
He is Madoka's secretary who makes sure he makes his costumes and is on schedule. He is serious but kind and treats Chihiro amiably. He loves sushi and pudding and has been with Madoka (along with a young Chiyo and Miyako) since childhood. He dislikes Madoka's eccentricity and laziness and always scolds him for bringing in stray cats. He gets along well with Chihiro, acting like a second parent since they are both serious, hard-working, and rather mature (and makes sure Madoka gets his work done). He seems oblivious (or is feigning obliviousness) to Miyako's feelings for him.
Miyako Ōtori (凰 美耶子, Ōtori Miyako)
Voiced by: Madoka Yonezawa (drama CD) Yui Makino (anime) (Japanese); Leah Clark (English)
A kind cheerful young heiress formerly engaged to Madoka since her grandfather and the former head of the Ōtori family were friends before her father broke it off (due to Madoka's involvement). She feels bound by her father and wonders if she is being selfish and should live as her father tells her but Chihiro encourages her to follow her heart. She has romantic feelings for Keiichiro and is a terrific cook, specializing in western cooking and making pudding (basically since it is Keiichiro's favorite), but tends to make a mess when she cooks, since she learned to cook from Madoka and she is also bad at cleaning. She is currently under training from Chihiro, to learn to cook and clean. She owns a pet dog given to her by Chihiro. She named her dog, Antaro. She is good friends with Madoka and Chihiro.
Yūji Hino (日野祐司, Hino Yūji)
Voiced by: Yūki Kaji (drama CD) Mitsuki Saiga (anime) (Japanese); Morgan Berry (English)
One of Chihiro's three friends and his main best friend. He is the middle of six children in the Hino family and is concerned about Chihiro since his mother's death, proving to be a loyal friend. He has silver hair. His family owns three dogs and are carpenters. He likes spicy food and is good friends with Madoka (his family having worked as Madoka's gardeners for years). He loves horror films.
Ryūji (竜児)
Voiced by: Natsuki Hanae (Japanese); Brandon McInnis (English)
The youngest member of a boy band called Uchouten boys. He is young and friendly and can be somewhat childish, but dislikes being treated like a child. He went to Madoka to ask for a change in his design since he stopped wanting to look like a kid by wearing shorts but was refused. He realizes he is made to wear shorts since his legs are considered attractive and that he shouldn't be afraid to show them off (with a little help from Chihiro and Madoka). As an idol, he is not as talented as the other members, but is a hard worker. He can be forgetful, considering he forgot to report his lost wallet and phone to the police and even a little clumsy since he told his group mates where he went by mistake but he is caring.
Hayato (隼人)
Voiced by: Taku Yashiro (Japanese); Ivan Jasso (English)
One of the leader of the idol group Uchouten boys. He is tall with black hair, handsome and mature for his age and emits a dazzling aura. He looks out for Ryuji like a younger brother. When stressed, he plays with Ryuji's hair, which is a replacement for stroking the fur of a cat he owned when young.
Ibuki (伊吹)
Voiced by: Kazutomi Yamamoto (Japanese); Oscar Seung (English)
One of the members of Uchouten boys. He has a princely character that hides a fiery temper but is caring towards his group mates.
Chiyo Komiya (小宮千代, Komiya Chiyo)
Voiced by: Yukari Tamura (Japanese); Michelle Rojas (English)
Chihiro's eccentric mother whom he has a strong resemblance to. She cut off relations with her family after she disgraced her father by giving birth to a child with a man he opposed her marriage to. Her husband died shortly after Chihiro was born. She lived a poor but happy life with her son but died of a heart attack due to overwork. Her motto was "Those who don't work don't eat" and was bad at cooking except for tamagoyaki.
Kazusa Takatori (鷹取上総, Takatori Kazusa)
Voiced by: Yoshiko Sakakibara (Japanese); Linda Leonard (English)
The mother of Madoka and Chiyo and grandmother of Chihiro. According to Keiichiro, the two didn't get along, even before Chiyo left. When Chihiro watches her try to pet the cat, it embarrasses her.
Yukito Amahara (アマハラ ゆきと, Amahara Yukito)
Voiced by: Asuna Tomari (Japanese); Kristen McGuire (English)
A classmate and friend of Chihiro's from school. He has reddish brown hair and orange eyes.
Hiroshi Takei (武井 ヒロシ, Takei Hiroshi)
Voiced by: Kaede Hondo (Japanese); Kate Oxley (English)
Another classmate and friend of Chihiro's from school. He has dark green hair, olive green eyes, and wears glasses.
Yuu Nomura (野村 ゆう, Nomura Yuu)
Voiced by: Mikako Izawa (Japanese); Holly Franklin (English)
A female classmate of Chihiro from school; she has romantic feelings for Chihiro. She has dark purple hair that is usually worn in a ponytail.
Hanako Hino (日野 花子, Hino Hanako)
Voiced by: Akiko Yajima (Japanese); Natalie Hoover (English)
One of Yūji Hino's siblings. She is a happy and energetic little girl that is into princesses. She doesn't like anyone get into her personal stuff especially her brother.

== Media ==
=== Manga ===
Ototachibana launched the series in Enterbrain's B's-Log Comic magazine on 12 March 2008, and it concluded on 1 March 2017. An audio drama CD was included with the limited edition of the sixth volume in April 2013.

==== Volumes ====
No.	Japanese release date	Japanese ISBN
1	1 December 2008	978-4-7577-4599-5
2	1 June 2009	978-4-7577-4939-9
3	1 February 2010	978-4-04-726219-5
4	28 February 2011	978-4-04-727057-2
5	29 December 2011	978-4-04-727715-1
6	1 April 2013 (regular edition); 1 April 2013 (limited edition)	978-4-04-728846-1; ISBN 978-4-04-728847-8
7	1 February 2014	978-4-04-729430-1
8	1 November 2014	978-4-04-730025-5
9	1 April 2016	978-4-04-734026-8
10	1 April 2017	9784047345522

=== Anime ===
A 12-episode anime television series adaptation, directed by Yusuke Yamamoto and produced by Eight Bit, aired between 8 April (Note: The premiere is listed for 7 April at 25:58, which is the same as 1:58 on 8 April.) and 1 July 2016 on TBS, and also aired on CBC, Sun TV, and BS-TBS. The series is written by Yoshiko Nakamura, with character designs by Kana Ishida. The opening theme song is "Innocent promise" by Trustrick, and the ending theme song is "Zutto Only You" (ずっとOnly You) performed by Natsuki Hanae, Taku Yashiro, and Kazutomi Yamamoto.

A spin-off titled Uchōten Nicosei (有頂天☆ニコ生) focuses on the fictional Uchōten Boys idol group. The first episode first aired on Niconico on 14 March 2016, and was followed by regular episodes beginning on 11 April 2016.

==== Episodes ====
No.	Title	Original release date
1	"Those Who Don't Work Don't Eat" "Hatarakazaru Mono Kū Bekarazu" (はたらかざる者食うべからず)	8 April 2016
2	"Failure is the Mother of Success" "Shippai wa Seikō no Haha" (しっぱいは成功の母)	22 April 2016
3	"If You Feed a Dog for Three Days, It Will Be Grateful for Three Years" "Inu wa Mikka Kaeba Sannen On o Wasurenu" (いぬは三日飼えば三年恩を忘れぬ)	29 April 2016
4	"What You Like, You Will Do Well" "Suki Koso Mono no Jōzu Nare" (好きこそ物の上手なれ)	6 May 2016
5	"A Man Never Goes Back on His Word" "Danshi no Hitokoto Kintetsu no Gotoshi" (だんしの一言金鉄の如し)	13 May 2016
6	"Even a Chance Encounter is Preordained" "Sode Furiau mo Tashō no Enishi" (袖振り合うも多生の縁)	20 May 2016
7	"Learning Doesn't Happen in a Day" "Gakumon wa Ichinichi ni Shite Narazu" (学問は一日にしてならず)	27 May 2016
8	"The Devil Scoffs When You Talk of Next Year" "Rainen o Ieba Oni ga Warau" (来年を言えば鬼が笑う)	3 June 2016
9	"Charity Brings Its Own Reward" "Nasake wa Hito no Tame Narazu" (情けは人の為ならず)	10 June 2016
10	"No Heat or Cold Lasts Beyond the Equinox" "Atsusa Samusa mo Higan Made" (暑さ寒さも彼岸まで)	17 June 2016
11	"Boys, Be Ambitious" "Shōnen yo, Taishi o Dake" (少年よ、大志を抱け)	24 June 2016
12	"All's Well That Ends Well" "Owari Yokereba Subete Yoshi" (終わり良ければすべて良し)	1 July 2016
