= Vera Blanc =

- Logo from Vera Blanc: Full Moon.
- Developer(s): Winter Wolves
- Publisher(s): Winter Wolves, Ratalaika Games
- Engine: Ren'Py
- Platform(s): Android, iOS, Linux, Mac OS, Microsoft Windows, Nintendo Switch, PlayStation 4, Xbox One
- Release: Full Moon; June 30, 2010; Ghost In The Castle; September 1, 2010
- Genre(s): Visual Novel
- Mode(s): Single-player

Vera Blanc is an Italian mystery visual novel video game series for the Android, iOS, Linux, Mac OS, and Microsoft Windows platforms, with art in the comic style. The games were developed and published by Winter Wolves. The first game Vera Blanc: Full Moon was released on June 30, 2010 and the sequel Vera Blanc: Ghost In The Castle on September 1, 2010. There are currently no plans for another sequel of the series.

The first game was ported for iOS on October 13, 2010 and for Android on February 2, 2011. The second game was ported for iOS on November 30, 2010. The first game was ported and published to Nintendo Switch, PlayStation 4, and Xbox One by Ratalaika Games. The console versions were released in November 2020.

== Gameplay ==
The player reads through the story and makes decisions at some points. Furthermore, the player has to solve some mysteries with minigames; the protagonist, Vera, for example can sometimes read the minds of other characters, so the player has to guess letters in the style of Hangman to complete the thoughts of them. The player can also disable the minigames and just read the story without them.

== Plot ==
=== Vera Blanc: Full Moon ===
Vera Blanc, the daughter of Emmanuel Blanc, can read other people's minds. She leaves her life of luxury to use her powers to work alongside paranormal detective Brandon Mackey. Vera travels to a mysterious town in Germany deep in the Black Forest. A serial killer is on the loose, and all leads point to a werewolf as the culprit.

=== Vera Blanc: Ghost in the Castle ===
Vera travels to a small village in central Italy. The town's legendary ghost seems like nothing more than a quaint story, but a string of murders and suicides all point to the castle's ghost, and locals are getting scared.

== Reception ==
The first game got 4 out of 5 stars on Gamezebo with reviewer Mike Rose writing: "Vera Blanc: Full Moon is well worth a play, and will keep you hooked right through to the end."

It also got a score of 91/100 on Technologytell with reviewer Jenni Lada writing: "Overall, Vera Blanc: Full Moon is an appealing new mystery visual novel. It stands out due to its unorthodox presentation and its supernatural mystery. While the character of Vera may seem a bit too good to be true, the story that players get to investigate is quite intriguing, especially since your choices effect what kind of ending and result you’ll find."

The second game got 3,5 out of 5 stars on Gamezebo with reviewer Mike Rose writing: "Vera Blanc: Ghost in the Castle isn't as well produced as the original, but there's still plenty of fun to be had, and those who played Full Moon will no doubt want to see how Vera's story progresses."
