= Brandon McInnis =

American voice actor

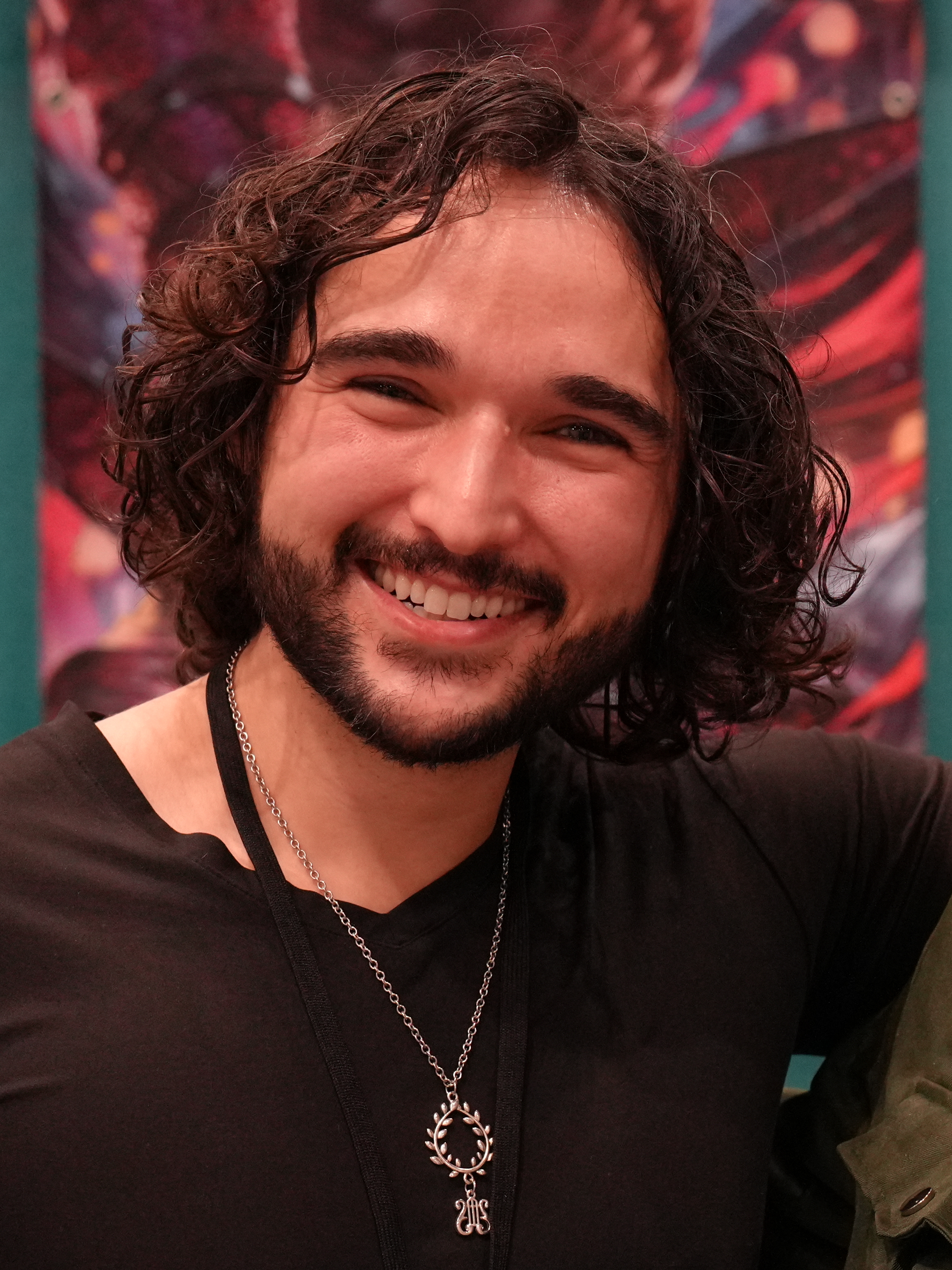
- McInnis at Animate! Raleigh in 2025
- Occupation: Voice actor
- Years active: 2014–present
- Spouse: J. Michael Tatum

Brandon McInnis is an American voice actor and translator. He previously worked as a software engineer before pursuing a career as an actor after being convinced by his brother to do so. Some of his noteworthy roles include Finral in Black Clover, Yūta Hibiki in SSSS.Gridman, Gen Asagiri in Dr. Stone, Sir Nighteye in My Hero Academia, Tsubasa Tanuma in Kaguya-sama: Love Is War, and Gyutaro in Demon Slayer: Kimetsu no Yaiba.

== Biography ==
In high school, Brandon McInnis did musical theater. However, at the time he did not pursue acting and instead graduated from college with a degree in Japanese. After working in Tokyo, he moved back to the United States to work as a software engineer. At the time, he had no plans of becoming an actor. However, his brother signed him up to audition for their town's local performance of Les Misérables, where he was eventually cast as a major character. After that, McInnis decided to pursue a career in acting.

McInnis is openly bisexual and married to fellow voice actor J. Michael Tatum.

== Filmography ==
=== Anime ===
List of voice performances in anime
Year	Title	Role	Notes	Source
2016	Black Butler: Book of Murder	Patrick Phelps		
2016	Shōnen Maid	Ryūji		
2016	The Heroic Legend of Arslan: Dust Storm Dance	Merlane		
2016	Danganronpa 3: The End of Hope's Peak High School	Sonosuke Izayoi		
2016	91 Days	Corteo		
2016	Joker Game	Alain		
2016	Touken Ranbu: Hanamaru	Atsushi Toushirou		
2016	Nanbaka	Samon		
2016	All Out!!	Tanashi		
2017	ēlDLIVE	Love		
2017	Dragon Ball Super	Ganos		
2017	Tsuki ga Kirei	Roman Yamashina		
2017	Saiyuki Reload Blast	Goujin		
2017	Classroom of the Elite	Ken Sudo		
2017	The Saga of Tanya the Evil	Cunningham		
2017	ACCA: 13-Territory Inspection Dept.	Lilium's Younger Brother		
2017	Akashic Records of Bastard Magic Instructor	Huey Rostahm		
2017	Samurai Warriors	Hideyori Toyotomi		
2017	Gamers!	Keita Amano		
2017	Star Blazers: Space Battleship Yamato 2199	Nobuhiko Sugiyama, Alter, Shigeru Hayashi		
2017	Black Clover	Finral		
2017	Dies Irae	Karl Krafft, Ren		
2017	Recovery of an MMO Junkie	Himeralda		
2017	Code: Realize − Guardian of Rebirth	Count Saint-Germain		
2017	King's Game: The Animation	Hirofumi		
2017	Blood Blockade Battlefront & Beyond	Toby		
2018	Junji Ito Collection	Kuroda		
2018	Dances with the Dragons	Helodel		
2018	This Boy Suffers from Crystallization		Translation assistant	
2018	The Master of Ragnarok & Blesser of Einherjar	Yuuto Suoh		
2018	Tokyo Ghoul:re	Mizuro Tamaki		
2018	SSSS.Gridman	Yūta Hibiki		
2019	Kono Oto Tomare! Sounds of Life	Yoshiki		
2019	Dr. Stone	Gen Asagiri		
2019	Actors: Songs Connection	Saku		
2019	My Hero Academia	Sir Nighteye		
2020	Kaguya-sama: Love Is War	Tsubasa Tanuma/Kashiwagi's boyfriend		
2020	Appare-Ranman!	Al Lyon		
2020	Gleipnir	Hatta		
2020	Sleepy Princess in the Demon Castle	Paladins		
2020	Fire Force	Yūichirō Kurono		
2020	The Gymnastics Samurai	Leonardo		
2021	Back Arrow	Shū Bi		
2021	A3!	Yuki Rurikawa		
2021	Life Lessons with Uramichi Oniisan	Iketeru Daga		
2021	Re-Main	Keita Kakihana		
2021	Mushoku Tensei: Jobless Reincarnation	Man-God (Hitogami)		
2021	Banished from the Hero's Party	Ares Srowa		
2022	She Professed Herself Pupil of the Wise Man	Solomon		
2022	Sabikui Bisco	Milo Nekoyanagi		
2022	Sasaki and Miyano	Taiga Hirano		
2022	Odd Taxi	Kenshiro Daimon		
2022	The Prince of Tennis	Chotaro Otori		
2022	Demon Slayer: Kimetsu no Yaiba	Gyutaro		
2022	Given	Mafuyu Satō		
2022	Orient	Kijinosuke		
2022	Kakegurui Twin	Kanade Musubi		
2022	Beyblade Burst QuadDrive	Phelix Payne		
2023	Record of Ragnarok	Beelzebub		
2024	Black Butler: Public School Arc	Lawrence Bluewer		
2024	Mission: Yozakura Family	Taiyo's Friends, Mizuki, Ken-Ken		
2026	Banana Fish	Ash Lynx		

=== Films ===
List of voice performances in films
Year	Title	Role	Notes	Source
2021	The Stranger by the Shore	Wada		
2021	The Prince of Tennis II Hyotei vs. Rikkai Game of Future	Chotaro Otori		
2022	Shin Ultraman	Akihisa Taki	English dub	
2024	Mobile Suit Gundam: Silver Phantom	Male Protagonist	VR movie	
2025	The Rose of Versailles	André Grandier	Netflix dub	

=== Video games ===
List of voice performances in video games
Year	Title	Role	Notes	Source
2014	Smite	Erlang Shen		
2016	The Lord of the Rings Online	Frodo Baggins		
2019	Borderlands 3	Caber Dowd, Dickon Goyle, Kendor Bronson, Male Gunslinger		
2020	Cobra Kai: The Karate Kid Saga Continues	Cruz, Biker		
2022	Chivalry 2	King Argon II		
2022	Return to Monkey Island	Ned Filigree		
2023	Fire Emblem Engage	Alear (male)		
2023	Anonymous;Code	Kent Korihisa		
2023	Silent Hope	Wanderer		
2024	Card-en-Ciel	Osseus, Claude Otrechaos, Butterfly (male), Shinya Zerosaki, additional voices		
2025	Like a Dragon: Pirate Yakuza in Hawaii	Nishida		
2025	Rune Factory: Guardians of Azuma	Subaru		
2026	Code Vein II	Zenon Gryfgote (singing)		
2026	Yakuza Kiwami 3 & Dark Ties	Nishida, additional voices		
2026	The Adventures of Elliot: The Millennium Tales	Kai		
2027	Romancing SaGa 3: Destinies United	Thomas Bent		

=== Drama CD ===
List of voice performances in drama CDs
Year	Title	Role	Notes	Source
2018	This Boy Will Be Called a Villain	K		

=== Audio books ===
List of voice performances in audio books
Year	Title	Role	Notes	Source
2025	All Star Superman	Jimmy Olsen		

== Discography ==
List
Year	Title	Role	Notes	Source
2024	Epic: The Wisdom Saga	Apollo	1 track, "God Games"	
