= Planet Stronghold =

2011 video game

- Developer: Winter Wolves
- Publisher: Winter Wolves
- Engine: Ren'Py
- Platforms: Linux, Mac OS X, Windows, Android, iOS
- Release: Linux, Mac OS X, Windows; February 28, 2011; Android; May 18, 2012; iOS; January 15, 2014
- Genre: Visual novel
- Mode: Single-player

Planet Stronghold is a visual novel, sci-fi role-playing video game with a turn-based combat system, developed and published by Italian studio Winter Wolves in February 2011 for Linux, Mac OS X, and Windows platforms in February 2011, for Android in May 2012, and for iOS in January 2014.

== Gameplay ==
Gameplay screenshot

The game offers a mix of classic visual novel gameplay, with dialogues and many choices to make, with role-playing video game-style battles. The player has the ability to choose the gender of the protagonist. For every gender there are three optional romance endings, for a total of 6 different romance endings.

== Reception ==
The game received a score of 78/100 on Gamertell, with reviewer Jenni Lada writing "Planet Stronghold isn't for everyone. It's a good game, but it's also quite challenging. This may dissuade beginners or typical visual novel players, who may not be accustomed to level-grinding characters, seeking out extra battles and carefully managing character equipment to keep everyone at their best." Mac Games gave 4 of 5 stars and wrote: "The anime artwork is exquisite as always with great alien drawings. The instructions are clear and stats detailed." GameZebo gave 3,5 of 5 stars and wrote: "If Planet Stronghold has a weakness, it's that the story and characters in and of themselves aren't especially interesting. The game isn't poorly written or even poorly translated, it's just a bit generic given the type of anime sci-fi fare that's clearly influenced it. That doesn't matter quite so much when the game is simply fun to play for its own sake, which it is." Ratings Per Game explained and criticized the flaws in parts of the games combat mechanics. Such as the music not looping, the Grenades not being able to stack, and obvious chosen one aspect with the Nelson family. However she stated it was worth playing if one could overlook the flaws in the story and mechanics. The artwork, while praised, was criticized for its costume design.

== Sequel ==
A sequel is in production stages.
