= ĒlDLIVE =

Japanese manga series

- ēlDLIVE
- First tankōbon volume cover, featuring Chūta Kokonose

エルドライブ (Erudoraibu)
- Genre: Adventure; Science fiction
- Manga
- Written by: Akira Amano
- Published by: Shueisha
- English publisher: NA: Viz Media
- Imprint: Jump Comics
- Magazine: Jump Live (2013–14); Shōnen Jump+ (2014–18)
- English magazine: NA: Weekly Shonen Jump
- Original run: August 1, 2013 – November 5, 2018
- Volumes: 11
- Anime television series
- Directed by: Takeshi Furuta; Tomoya Tanaka
- Written by: Toshimitsu Takeuchi
- Music by: Yasuharu Takanashi
- Studio: Pierrot
- Licensed by: NA: Crunchyroll
- Original network: Tokyo MX, FBS, YTV, STV, CTV, BS11
- Original run: January 8, 2017 – March 26, 2017
- Episodes: 12
- icon

Ēldlive (Japanese: エルドライブ, Hepburn: Erudoraibu; stylized as ēlDLIVE) is a Japanese manga series by Akira Amano. It started serialization via Shueisha's online app Jump Live in August 2013, switching to the digital publication Shōnen Jump+ after it launched in September 2014. It has been collected in eleven tankōbon volumes. The first three chapters were published in English by Viz Media in 2014. A 12-episode anime television series adaptation by Pierrot aired between January and March 2017.

== Plot ==
Chūta Kokonose is a middle school boy who has been able to hear a voice that no one else could hear for as long as he could remember. One day, a strange blue alien named Chips appeared and recruited him to the space police, ēlDLIVE because he fit the requirements. During his entrance test, he discovered the voice he hears actually comes from a small white alien living in his body who he later named Dolugh. Combining his power with Dolugh, he was able to complete his exam using a power called SPH (Space Pheromone), used only by aliens. Chūta, now an officer, along with his coworker and classmate, Misuzu Sonokata, and the rest of the Solar System Area station have to work together to protect the universe from dangerous criminals.

== Characters ==
=== Main characters ===
Chūta Kokonose (九ノ瀬 宙太, Kokonose Chūta)
Voiced by: Ayumu Murase (Japanese); Morgan Berry (English)
Chūta is a fourteen-year-old second-year student at Shirobori Middle School. Recruited by Chips, he serves as a Rank 1 officer in élDLIVE's Division 2 at the Solar System District station, partnering with his classmate Misuzu Sonokata and Chips. He shares a symbiotic bond with Dolugh, a Monitalien whose voice only he has heard since childhood. Orphaned early, he lives with his aunt Mimi, whose poor housekeeping led him to become skilled in home economics. Once withdrawn after blaming himself for a childhood accident that killed four friends, he gradually gains confidence through his work at élDLIVE, fighting alongside Misuzu and Dolugh to protect others.
Dolugh (ドルー, Dorū)
Voiced by: Rie Kugimiya (Japanese); Kristen McGuire (English)
Dolugh is a Monitalien living in Chūta's body. He also acts as Chūta's SPH organ. Only Chūta can hear him, and his physical form did not appear until Chūta saved Tateyan. He is attached to Chūta until the day he dies, and if something happens to one of them, the other will feel it. The red gem on his forehead is one of the lost glyphs of Planet Glyph, where he was created for the purpose of monitoring other planets. Dolugh is a very curious and inquisitive creature, who also shows surprising insightfulness. He went through an upgrade during the remote control case and gained wings. His powers work by having Chūta visualize the attack and Dolugh executing it.
Misuzu Sonokata (其方 美鈴, Sonokata Misuzu)
Voiced by: Saori Hayami (Japanese); Dawn M. Bennett (English)
Misuzu is Chūta's teammate in élDLIVE's Division 2 and his classmate, originally assigned to observe him. A Rank 3 officer, she is intensely professional, contrasting with her popularity as an honor student at school. She joined the organization to escape her father's control, unaware her missing six months of memories stem from SPH organ implantation during the Taklimakan Project. This left her dependent on pills she believes are environmental adapters. Initially dismissive of Chūta, she begins respecting him after he clears her name during a critical case. Though she briefly avoids him when Dolugh's upgrade changes his scent, Dr. Love helps her overcome this. Her SPH abilities manifest as glowing purple rings. While competitive with Veronica, they share a bond with Ninotchka as fellow recruits from the same period.

=== élDLIVE ===
==== Solar System Bureau ====
Laine Brick (レイン・ブリック, Rein Burikku)
Voiced by: Tatsuhisa Suzuki (Japanese); Daman Mills (English)
The Chief of the Solar System Bureau. He wears an eyepatch to cover his artificial eye. He has a friendly, carefree personality, but also shows hints of a more mysterious, scheming side. However, he cares about his subordinates very much. He is one of the few who knows Misuzu's past. It is hinted that he got his position quickly despite his young age because of other reasons. He is shown enjoying sweets a lot, especially dango. For unknown reasons, he dislikes Madigan.
Chips (チップス, Chippusu)
Voiced by: Daiki Kobayashi (Japanese); Lara Woodhull (English)
A small blue alien who's the leader of Division 2 as well as the one who leads Chūta to élDLIVE. He holds the rank of Assistant Inspector, and act as support during cases. The antenna on his head allows him to shoot different types of SPH, one of which allows people to transfer from place to place. He is very rule-abiding and acts as the voice of reason, but can be childish as well. He says "-chu" at the end of all his sentences. He gets drunk on green tea.
Veronica Borowczyk (ベロニカ・ボロズウィック, Beronika Borozuwikku)
Voiced by: Riho Iida (Japanese); Morgan Lauré (English)
A criminal investigation assistant inspector and the leader of Division 5 of the CID. She is hot-headed, blunt person who is very competitive, especially against Misuzu. Her, Ninotchka, and Misuzu are friends as they all joined ēlDLIVE around the same time. She has a horn on her forehead that is usually hidden until she activates her SPH, which mainly boosts her leg power.
Nina Mikhailovna Pavlova (ニーナ・ミハイロヴナ・パーヴロヴァ, Nīna Mihairovuna Pāvurovua)
Voiced by: Lynn (Japanese); Alexis Tipton (English)
A criminal investigation officer who usually goes by the nickname Ninotchka (ニノチカ, Ninochika). She is in the 5th division and Veronica's partner. She joined ēlDLIVE around the same time as Veronica and Misuzu, which is how they became friends. A kind, gentle girl, she is also often the one who tries to stop Veronica and Misuzu from fighting and to admonish Veronica whenever she gets too hot-headed. She grew out her long hair to hide her body whenever she activates her SPH, as it causes her body to become very exposed. Her SPH takes the form of green funnels. In Season 4, she enrolled into Shirobori Middle School along with Veronica to bodyguard Dr. Love.
Dr. Love (Dr.ラヴ, Dr. Ravu) / Taklamakan Strange Love (タクラマカン・ストレインジ・ラヴ, Takuramakan Sutoreinji Ravu)
Voiced by: Yoshitsugu Matsuoka (Japanese); Brandon McInnis (English)
A 500-year-old genius scientist who appears as a teenage boy due to self-administered rejuvenation. His groundbreaking contributions to élDLIVE have made him a target for criminals, forcing him to relocate to Earth under Solar System bureau protection. As the former head of the controversial Taklamakan Project involving SPH organ transplants, he now provides medication for project survivor Misuzu. After surviving an attempted kidnapping by Darie Lime, who sought to access a supposed "door" in Misuzu's mind, he transfers to Shirobori to study Chūta and Dolugh more closely. While brilliant in his field, he struggles with social interactions, particularly with women, and often becomes overly absorbed in his research.
Meeru Riggs (メェル・リッグス, Meeru Riggusu)
Voiced by: Kenichirou Matsuda (Japanese); Chris Rager (English)
Tonto Art Tonto (トント・アート・トント, Tonto Āto Tonto)
Voiced by: Eriko Matsui (Japanese); Apphia Yu (English)
Professor Isaac (イサク教授, Isaku Kyouju)
Voiced by: Souichi Abe
Vega Victor (ヴェガ・ヴィクター, Vuega Vuikutā)
Voiced by: Hiroshi Kamiya
Vega is anime original character that does not appear in the manga.
Harry (ハリー, Harī)
Voiced by: Neeko
Maclane (マクレーン, Makurēn)
Voiced by: Minami Takahashi
Melies (メリエス, Meriesu)
Voiced by: Masaaki Ihara
Sheronimo (シェロニモ, Sheronimo)
Voiced by: Tomotaka Hachisuka
Marley (マーリー, Mārī)
Voiced by: Ayako Uemura
Virgil (ヴァージル, Vājiru)
Madigan (マディガン, Madigan)

==== Headquarters ====
Kieshi (キエシ, Kieshi)
Voiced by: Ken Narita
Bunyu (ブニュ, Bunyu)

=== Demille ===
Ken Mizoguchi (溝口 健, Mizoguchi Ken)
Voiced by: Takashi Kondō

=== Space Criminals ===
Saotome (さおとめ, Saotome) / Bocha (ボーチャー, Boochaa)
Voiced by: Shizuka Itō (Japanese), Whitney Rodgers (English) (Saotome), Kenichirou Matsuda (Bocha)
A teacher at Chūta's school. A highly attractive lady with pink hair, lips and eyes, she is commonly seen in Chūta's school wearing a pink top with a huge collar and an extremely short yellow pencil skirt. Apart from being rather slack on the rules, the boys at school are intrigued by her enormous breasts.
Dragline (ドラグライン, Doragurain)
Voiced by: Masaaki Ihara (Japanese); Chris Guerrero (English)

== Media ==
=== Manga ===
ēlDLIVE, written and illustrated by Akira Amano, began serialization on Shueisha's online app Jump Live on August 1, 2013; it ran for two seasons before moving to Shueisha's new digital publication service Shōnen Jump+ on September 22, 2014. The series finished on November 5, 2018. Shueisha collected its chapters in eleven tankōbon volumes, released from December 4, 2013, to January 4, 2019.

Viz Media published the English translation of the first three chapters in their Weekly Shounen Jump publication from September to October 2014. They released the volumes digitally from April 25, 2017, to October 22, 2019.

On May 30, 2014, a visual book titled Rebo to Dlive was released, featuring new and old illustrations from Amano's works, including ones from ēlDLIVE.

==== Volumes ====
No.	Release date	ISBN
1	December 4, 2013	978-4-08-870887-4
2	May 2, 2014	978-4-08-880116-2
3	February 4, 2015	978-4-08-880288-6
4	August 4, 2015	978-4-08-880537-5
5	March 5, 2016	978-4-08-880595-5
6	August 5, 2016	978-4-08-880768-3
7	December 31, 2016	978-4-08-880897-0
8	July 4, 2017	978-4-08-881130-7
9	February 2, 2018	978-4-08-881352-3
10	August 3, 2018	978-4-08-881545-9
11	January 4, 2019	978-4-08-881707-1

=== Anime ===
An anime television series adaptation was announced for January 2017 and aired between January 8, 2017, and March 26, 2017. The series was produced by Pierrot, and directed by Takeshi Furuta and Tomoya Tanaka, with scripts written by Toshimitsu Takeuchi, character designs by Han Seungah and Keiichirou Matsui, and music composed by Yasuharu Takanashi. The opening theme is "Our sympathy" by female singer Alfakyun, and the ending theme is "Kimi no Koe ga..." by the group The Super Ball. Crunchyroll streamed the series. Funimation streamed an English dub. On the last day of 2016, the official website revealed the rough design for the new characters by Akira herself.

==== Episodes ====
No.	Title	Original release date
1	"Chūta, the Voice, and the Qualifying Exam" "Chūta to Koe to Saiyō Shiken" (宙太と声と採用試験)	January 8, 2017
A loner at school, middle-school student Chūta Kokonose has long been regarded odd and the subject of ridicule among his classmates due to the fact that he constantly talks to what appears to himself. The truth is that Chūta has a voice inside him that only he can hear, prompting him to reply and talk back at it. During home economics class, he meets and develops a crush on the popular girl Misuzu Sonokata, who immediately dislikes him. Discouraged, Chūta goes back to his place of residence, a muffin shop where he lives with his aunt Mimi. When cleaning the shop, however, Chūta is teleported away into a spacecraft and introduced to ēIDLIVE, a secret space police agency that captures alien criminals. Wanting to recruit him, the chief Laine Brick smilingly invites him to take the entrance exam, which involves capturing a low-class alien criminal. Teleported back to Earth and his place of residence, Chūta goes around confronting people, until he meets his highly attractive teacher Saotome and his classmate Tateyuna coming back from the karaoke. As the voice inside Chūta repeatedly insists on calling Saotome "Blob-blob", he responds back angrily, angering Saotome and triggering her to transform into her true alien self. Using Tateyuna as a hostage, Chūta is forced to fight her and the voice inside him then takes the shape of a white rabbit-like creature sprouting from his chest. Instructing him how to use his very own power, they defeat Saotome and bring Tateyuna home. Returning to ēIDLIVE headquarters, Laine reveals that he has passed the entrance exam and is now a space police officer in the employ of ēIDLIVE.
2	"Super Cool Space Girl" "Sūpā Kūru Supēsu Gāru" (スーパー・クール・スペース・ガール)	January 15, 2017
At ēIDLIVE, Chūta is reintroduced to his classmate and fellow partner Misuzu, who unwillingly takes him on a tour of the place, and Chips, a miniature blue alien with three eyes and a habit to end sentences with "chu". The next day, Chūta returns to school, realizing that Tateyuna's memories have been wiped. However, Misuzu barges in suddenly and informs him that it is time for their guard duty shift. Forced to skip school, Chūta and Misuzu journey to headquarters, where they meet up with Laine. Intrigued by the voice inside Chūta, the "voice" takes form as the creature again, to which Laine explains that it is a Monitalien, a special creature with high-capabilities. To address the Monitalien, Chūta names it Dolugh. During their shift, a space criminal named Dragline is revealed to have escaped, and the duo is tasked to capture it. While bade to stay out, Misuzu transforms into an angel and using her spinning purple rings, handcuffs Dragline and successfully returns it to jail. Crushing harder than ever on her, Chūta tries to befriend her but is rebuffed to his dismay.
3	"After the Shoplifter!" "Manbiki Han o Oe!" (万引き犯を追え！)	January 22, 2017
Once more time for their shift, Chūta earns his ēlDLIVE badge and purple uniform. With his confidence growing, Chūta becomes more sociable and even makes friends with Tateyan, who proves to be really easygoing and kind, although a little greedy and pudgy. His confidence plummets when he tries to stop an alien robber stealing some gum and accidentally injures his aunt Mimi in the process. After wiping Mimi's memories, Chūta wants to go after the alien robber to keep aunt Mimi safe and confides his plan to Laine. Despite initial misgivings, Laine lets Misuzu, Chips and Chūta all go. Confronting the alien which is revealed to be made of something like gum, Chūta defeats it and saves a half-suffocated Misuzu. As usual, she declines him in a cold manner. Back at ēlDILVE headquarters, Laine approaches them and explains that the "gum alien" was part of a criminal organisation known as Demille, which wiped out a planet previously. Now, eliminating Demille is ēlDILVE's first priority.
4	"A Pursuer From the Past: Part 1" "Kako kara no Tsuigeki Sha: Sono Ichi" (過去からの追撃者・その1)	January 29, 2017
Reminiscing about the past, Chūta's thoughts are led astray as he remembers his three best friends: Michiro, Matsutaro and Ken Mizoguchi, all of whom died when they were on a mountain trip together when a precarious cliff collapsed. Before that, the four friends had buried a time capsule, and Chūta is unsuccessful in his attempts to find it. During school, two odd transfer students arrive and Misuzu and Dolugh collapse in the middle of assembly, much to a shock of a bewildered Chūta. Driving a humongous robot, Chips escorts all of them safely to headquarters as the crew investigate this matter. After some basic training, they are returned to school, where Chūta meets a new transfer student under the name of Mikio Narita, but looks exactly like his old friend Ken. Wanting to investigate the matter, Chūta directly contacts Mikio. As Misuzu and Chips try to follow, they are faced against the two odd transfer students.
5	"A Pursuer From the Past: Part 2" "Kako kara no Tsuigeki Sha: Sono Ni" (過去からの追撃者・その2)	February 5, 2017
Chūta is led into the forest and Mikio reveals himself to truly be Ken as well as an honorary member of Demille, owing to their mark branded on his stomach. Wanting to extract Dolugh and repay Chūta for letting Michiro and Matsutaro die, Ken draws his swords against Misuzu and Chips, who have been knocked out by the two odd transfer students, subordinates of Ken. As ēlDLIVE tries to intervene, their systems are blocked by Demille's spacecraft. Forced to face Ken alone and reluctantly, Misuzu awakes miraculously owing to anti-sleep medicine prescribed to her via Dr. Issac, ēlDLIVE's alien physician and destroys the aliens. Transforming once more into an angel, she and Ken begin to duel. Injured by a blow to the head, Ken barely has time to revel in his moment of glory and triumph before Chūta stabs him right through his Demille mark. Shocked and bleeding, Ken is unable to fight and is made to talk things through nicely with Chūta instead. Quickly, they renew their friendship but Ken still orders him to be under the pretext that they are enemies before departing. This proves to be difficult, especially when the duo and Chips return to headquarters and find the spacecraft of ēlDLIVE, the Jeanrenoi-R under attack from Demille. After battling it out, the Demille vessel retreats and Chūta returns to Earth to visit his friends' supposed graves. Bumping into Ken's mother who had previously blamed him for their deaths as well, he attempts to leave, but his stopped by her as she apologizes for her outbursts at that time. In tears, she also shows Chūta the time capsule they had buried and a badge saying "Forever" that was on his backpack the day he "died".
6	"Something to Believe in: Part 1" "Shinjirarerumono: Sono Ichi" (信じられるもの・その一)	February 12, 2017
Misuzu is accused of releasing Dragline after security footage shows so, and is currently under interrogation. In the midst of all this, she falls into a coma, and Chūta is tasked by Dr. Issac and Laine to find a mysterious Dr. Love. Known to be a genius scientist, Misuzu was actually a test subject in one of his experiments that went particularly wrong, nearly resulting in death. Right now, she is surviving on medicine prescribed to her by Dr. Issac, but his formula is faulty and thus needs Dr. Love's expertise. Chūta is then introduced to his new comrades: A hot-tempered and competitive girl named Veronica Borowczyk and her partner and best friend, a beautiful girl with an angelic personality called Nina Mikhailovna Pavlova, or "Ninotchka" for short. Scheduled to meet Dr. Love at a café, they are confronted by a criminal in search of Dr. Love as well. The two parties manage to find Dr. Love's secret base at the same time, but the scientist is dead and another young man standing there covered in blood. Thinking him to be the murderer, the criminal tries to kill him but is revealed to be under the control of someone else and is removed from the trance by the boy. Handcuffed by Veronica, he reveals his true identity as Dr. Love himself, and the dead body to be merely "old skin shed". As they attempt to bring him back, Veronica is abruptly stabbed by Ninotchka, who is now being controlled instead.
7	"Something to Believe in: Part 2" "Shinjirarerumono: Sono Ni" (信じられるもの・その二)	February 19, 2017
Ninotchka transforms into a shockingly revealing form and attempts to steal Dr. Love away by force but Chūta decides to intervene. Annoyed, the two begin to duel as Dr. Love recharges his un-hypnotizer machine. Chūta is soon on the losing end due to his unwillingness to hurt Ninotchka as well as the vast difference in their experience and abilities. Quickly, he is overpowered and Dolugh, sensing weakness, begins to relocate to find itself a new host, it being a Monitalien's natural instinct. Suffering intensely, Chūta manages to pull Dolugh back and regain his life force as well as new powers, a near-impossible feat. Dolugh's increase in power and sympathy lets Chūta enhance his speed through two miniature wings and they attack Ninotchka again, managing to handcuff her. While she struggles, Dr. Love removes her from the trance and she collapses. However, Dr. Love's data has gathered that the hypnosis began at least two hours ago, before they had even left the Jeanrenoi-R. As hypnosis requires direct eye contact, this proves that it must have been someone in ēlDILVE that had met Ninotchka. Suspecting something, Chūta rushes back to ēlDLIVE with Dr. Love, Veronica, Chips and Ninotchka in a tow.
8	"Something to Believe in: Part 3" "Shinjirarerumono: Sono San" (信じられるもの・その三)	February 26, 2017
Remembering the red-eyed alien interrogating everyone of them, Chūta returns to find the Jeanrenoi-R in chaos. Confirming his suspicions, Chūta chases the culprit, who gets lost in the huge aircraft and accidentally jumps into space, suffocating and dying. With all the commotion over, Veronica and Ninotchka receive treatments from their severe wounds, while Misuzu is put under Dr. Love's care and soon revives, completely healthy with no knowledge or memory of anything, not even Dr. Love. Just as things begin to smooth out, friction occurs between Misuzu and Chūta again as she insists that his SPH (a type of identification present in body odor allowing one to detect others' when they are using their powers) smells.
9	"Misuzu's Lie" "Misuzu no Uso" (美鈴の嘘)	March 5, 2017
10	"Capture That Face" "Ano Kao o Tsukamaero" (あの顔をつかまえろ)	March 12, 2017
11	"Your Voice..." "Kimi no Koe ga..." (キミノコエガ･･･)	March 19, 2017
12	"Our Sympathy"	March 26, 2017

== Reception ==
=== Previews ===
The anime series' first episode received mixed reviews from Anime News Network's staff during the Winter 2017 season previews. Rebecca Silverman noted how the aesthetic of the episode, with its alien designs and story presentation, added to the basic shonen introduction that felt like a return to the fun Saturday morning cartoons of yesteryear. Nick Creamer criticized the first half for having stilted writing and the second half for revealing the show's "fundamental blandness" with a lackluster execution of its premise. Bamboo Dong said that the show would not have the longevity to be in the "Annals of anime history," but gave praise to the overall throwback to '90s cartoons in both its character designs and "sense of nostalgic excitement." Paul Jensen expressed what both Silverman and Dong said about the Saturday morning cartoon quality of the series' episode, saying it will appeal to that kind of audience for a few episodes instead of the average "late-night anime audience." Theron Martin commended the visual style and technical transitions throughout the episode but was critical of the two main leads having generic personality traits.

During its airing in February 2017, the Tokyo Metropolitan Police Department teamed up with ēlDLIVE to fight illegal employment which the posters had put up in some areas around February 2017.

=== Series ===
Allen Moody of THEM Anime Reviews said about the series overall: "Hardly deep, but a terrific ride; fans of classic sci-fi should have a great time. It's flashy (even if, admittedly, often incredibly silly-though maybe that cheesiness is part of its charm), downright weird at times, and has a number of endearing cast members (and if we have issues with Misuzu's personality, at least her transformation looks impressive.) And it's got that ineffable quality of childlike innocence, in spite of its fanservice, which is a pretty good trick."
