= Code: Realize =

Code: Realize − Guardian of Rebirth
- Japanese cover art
- Developer: Otomate
- Publishers: JP: Idea Factory; WW: Aksys Games
- Director: Joe Ninomae
- Artist: Miko
- Writers: Nao Kojima; Yū Nishimura
- Composer: Peak A Soul+
- Platforms: PlayStation Vita, PlayStation 4, Nintendo Switch
- Release: PlayStation Vita: JP: November 27, 2014; NA: October 20, 2015; EU: October 21, 2015; PlayStation 4: JP: August 24, 2017; NA: March 30, 2018; EU: 2018; Nintendo Switch: JP: September 13, 2018; WW: February 6, 2020
- Genre: Visual novel
- Mode: Single-player

Code: Realize − Guardian of Rebirth (Note: Known in Japan as Code:Realize ~Sōsei no Himegimi~ (Japanese: Code:Realize 〜創世の姫君〜)) is an otome visual novel video game developed by Otomate for PlayStation Vita, released in 2014 in Japan and in 2015 in North America and Europe. The game features a steampunk aesthetic and a cast of literary and historical figures, including Arsène Lupin, Abraham Van Helsing, Victor Frankenstein, Impey Barbicane, and Count Saint-Germain. Two fan discs, Code: Realize − Future Blessings, (Note: Known in Japan as Code: Realize ~Shukufuku no Mirai~ (Code:Realize ~祝福の未来~)) and Code: Realize − Wintertide Miracles were released on November 26, 2016 and February 14, 2019, respectively. Aksys Games localized both games in English. An anime television series adaptation by M.S.C aired from October 7 to December 23, 2017.

== Plot ==
Cardia lives day to day isolated from the world in a restricted, abandoned mansion in order to fulfill her promise to her father. Her body carries a deadly poison that rots or melts anything that her skin touches – causing the locals to call her a monster. Her father tells her to stay away from people and falling in love, but he suddenly disappears. One day, her quiet solitude is interrupted when the Royal Guards break in to capture her. That's when she meets the chivalrous thief Arsène Lupin, who helps her break free from the Royal Guards. Cardia then finds herself on a journey with Lupin and his gang to locate her father and find a way to remove the poison from her body.

== Characters ==
Cardia Beckford (カルディア・ベックフォード, Karudia Bekkufōdo)
Voiced by: Saori Hayami (anime) (Japanese); Jill Harris (anime) (English)
Cardia is a girl who carries a virulent poison within her body that melts everything she touches due to a crystal known as Horologium in her body, resulting her to be considered as a monster. She has lost all memories about herself since two years ago for exception of her father who told her to never fall in love and always stay at the mansion until the day he returns. Having lived an isolated life and feared as a monster by people, Cardia lacked emotions and knowledge of the world. On the verge of being captured by the English army, she is stolen away by Arséne Lupin. She then begins to work with Lupin and his allies to find her father and a way to remove the poison from her body so she can experience human touch and warmth.
Arsène Lupin (アルセーヌ・ルパン, Arusēnu Rupan)
Voiced by: Tomoaki Maeno (Japanese); J. Michael Tatum (anime) (English)
Lupin is a great thief who enjoys causing problems and claims that there is nothing that cannot be stolen. Bright and optimistic, he is very confident. Backing that up are his thievery skills and his ability to take action. He was the one who stole Cardia away from the English army when she was about to be captured and now he has begun to work with her. He seems as if he has some sort of goal in mind. As the story progresses, he falls in love with Cardia. In the anime, he is Cardia's love interest.
Abraham Van Helsing (エイブラハム・ヴァン・ヘルシング, Eiburahamu Van Herushingu)
Voiced by: Junichi Suwabe (Japanese); Ian Sinclair (anime) (English)
Called Van (Van Helsing in localized version) by Lupin and his friends, he is a former member of the secret intelligence organization Twilight and widely known as the war hero for his part in the war against vampires. Possessing excellent combat skills, he is called the Human Weapon. If it is for his own goals, then he will use any method possible, and he has a side to him where he can be described as cold. Deep down, he grows to care for Lupin's gang, but doesn't show it openly. He is going after the head of Twilight, Finis, whom he holds a grudge against.
Victor Frankenstein (ヴィクター・フランケンシュタイン, Vikutā Furankenshutain)
Voiced by: Tetsuya Kakihara (Japanese); Micah Solusod (anime) (English)
Nicknamed Fran (Victor in localized version) by his friends, he is an elite who holds the title of former Head Alchemist of the Imperial Court for the English Government. He has an unparalleled amount of knowledge and intelligence. However, he does not let that be overbearing as he is very gentle and kind. Due to some circumstances, he is now on a wanted list and the government is hunting him down. He joins Lupin's gang after discovering Cardia's Horologium, offering to help her find a way to remove her poison.
Impey Barbicane (インピー・バービケーン, Inpī Bābikēn)
Voiced by: Showtaro Morikubo (Japanese); Chris Guerrero (anime) (English)
Impey is a genius engineer who aspires to find a way for people to go to the Moon. He is friendly and upbeat, often setting the mood for the group. His downside is that he does push his luck sometimes. However, as an engineer his talent lies in high-end goods. Everything from Lupin's small tools and automobile, all the way to a ship that flies in the sky, are all his specialty. Impey is also extraordinarily good at cooking. He falls in love with Cardia at first sight and since then often flirts with her.
Saint-Germain (サン・ジェルマン, San Jeruman)
Voiced by: Daisuke Hirakawa (Japanese); Brandon McInnis (anime) (English)
Count Saint-Germain is a noble who has taken residence in the city of copper machines, London. Giving the simple reason of 'this seems interesting', he becomes the patron for Lupin and his allies, giving them both a place to stay as well as funding their activities. A complete gentleman, he has a gentle demeanor and constantly maintains a polite attitude. However, sometimes he disappear to somewhere unknown.
Delacroix II (ドラクロワ二世, Dorakurowa Nisei)
Voiced by: Miho Ishigami (Japanese); Trina Nishimura (anime) (English)
Nicknamed "Delly", he is a pureblood vampire child who is the sole survivor of the vampire royalty that was annihilated during the Vampire War. He used to be Van's disciple, and thus, felt betrayed when Van killed his parents and many of his kin. He swore vengeance against human race, his first act being retrieving back his clan's treasures. Upon reuniting with Van, he fought to avenge his kin, but was defeated. Sympathizing with the vampire boy, Cardia and the others decided to take him under their wing, with Delly agreeing as he sees it as an opportunity to kill his enemies.
Finis (フィーニス, Fīnisu)
Voiced by: Yūki Kaji (Japanese); Justin Briner (anime) (English)
Finis is the head of England's secret intelligence organization Twilight. He claimed to be Isaac's son, making him Cardia's younger brother. However, his background and activities are shrouded in mystery. He targets Cardia because she's crucial to realize their father's plan. Even though he always refers Cardia as his sister, he has intense jealousy and envy against her because their father only loves her while neglecting him.
Alexandrina Victoria (アレクサンドリナ・ヴィクトリア, Arekusandorina Vuikutoria)
Voiced by: Naomi Iida (Japanese); Stephanie Young (anime) (English)
The queen of London who is closely acquainted with Fran and the one who put the bounty on him.
Herlock Sholmès (エルロック・ショルメ, Erurokku Shorume)
Voiced by: Kazuya Murakami (Japanese); Austin Tindle (English)
He is a private detective who came to London upon being summoned by Scotland Yard.
Isaac Beckford (アイザック・ベックフォード, Aizakku Bekkufōdo)
Voiced by: Daichi Endō (Japanese); Greg Dulcie (anime) (English)
The father of Cardia and Finis, he is a famous scientist throughout England. The creator of Code:Realize.

== Development ==
Code: Realize − Guardian of Rebirth was developed by Idea Factory's otome games branch Otomate. Character designs and illustrations were handled by Miko while Nao Kojima and Yū Nishimura wrote the scenario. It was first released on November 27, 2014, in Japan for PlayStation Vita and is rated CERO C. A fan disc titled Code: Realize − Future Blessings (Code:Realize ~祝福の未来~, Code: Realize ~Shukufuku no Mirai~) was released on November 26, 2016. A Nintendo Switch version was released in April 2020. It was announced at Otomate Party 2015 along with the announcement of Otomate's 12 new titles. The game features new routes and supplemental stories and routes are set after the different endings of the original game, allowing protagonists to spend time with the heroes. A PlayStation 4 release comprising both games, titled Code: Realize − Bouquet of Rainbows (Note: Released in Japan as Code: Realize ~Saikō no Hanataba~ (Code:Realize ～彩虹の花束～).) was released on August 24, 2017. Another fan disc titled Code: Realize − Silver Miracles (Note: Released in Japan as Code: Realize ~Shirogane no Kiseki~ (Code:Realize ～白銀の奇跡～).) was announced for both PlayStation Vita and PlayStation 4.

Whilst the previous two games have Cardia not voiced, in December 2016, the official blog of Otomate announced that Saori Hayami joined the franchise as the protagonist Cardia.

An English localisation by Aksys Games was released on October 20, 2015 for North America and Europe. They also plan to release the localisation of the fan disc and the PS4 version on March 30, 2018.

=== Music ===
The first game has Mao perform the opening and ending theme respectively titled "Floatable" and "Kakan -Love Brought Me Some Eternal Petals-" (花冠 -love brought me some eternal petals-). In the fan disc, Mao performs the opening and first ending theme respectively titled "Brightness ~Eternal Pure White~" and "My Dearest", Kaori Oda performs the second ending theme titled "Kibō no kanata" (希望の彼方), and SHOJI performs the third ending theme titled "Yumeiro Circus" (夢色サーカス). Yoshie Isogai wrote all the song lyrics. Myu arranged and composited the songs for the first game. Hijiri Anze arranged and composed the opening and the first two ending songs while Naoyuki Osada did the third ending song. Team Entertainment produced the songs and Peak A Soul+ produced the BGMs. Oda also performs the theme song "Inorimegurite" on the Silver Miracle fan disc.

== Other media ==
=== Anime ===
- Code:Realize − Guardian of Rebirth
- Anime television series
- Directed by: Hideyo Yamamoto
- Produced by: Takayuki Matsunaga; Shintarō Yoshitake; Satoshi Fukao; Takeshi Tanaka; Noritomo Isogai; Katsumi Kikumasa; Tetsuya Kakita
- Written by: Sayaka Harada
- Music by: Ryō Takahashi
- Studio: M.S.C
- Licensed by: NA: Crunchyroll
- Original network: AT-X, Tokyo MX, Sun TV, TV Aichi, BS11
- English network: SEA: Animax Asia
- Original run: October 7, 2017 – December 23, 2017
- Episodes: 12 + OVA

An anime adaptation produced by the studio M.S.C was broadcast starting from October 7 to December 23, 2017, on AT-X, Tokyo MX, Sun TV, TV Aichi, and BS11. Hideyo Yamamoto directed the series and Sayaka Harada handled the series composition. Aya Nakanishi adapted Miko's art for animation. Mia Regina performed the opening theme titled "Kalmia", while Saori Hayami performed the ending theme titled "Twinkle" under her character name Cardia. Crunchyroll streamed the series, while Funimation streamed a simuldub.

No.	Title (Note: All English titles are taken from Crunchyroll.)	Original release date
1	"London Steam"; Transliteration: "Rondon suchīmu" (Japanese: ロンドン・スチーム)	October 7, 2017
Cardia Beckford, a young girl living in old London, is feared and branded as a monster due to the possession of a virulent poison in her body that melts away at anything. Confined alone in her family mansion by her father, she is captured by the British Army but rescued by Arséne Lupin, a handsome thief, and his friend Impey Barbicane, who is a whiz at engineering. Riding off to their mansion hideout in the forest, she is introduced to Victor Frankenstein, a genius alchemist and scientist who acts together with Impey and Arsené. There, Cardia learns that her father, Isaac, was an inventor who created many amazing inventions, one of which, the Horologium, is embedded inside her and currently functions as her heart. It is that reason that Cardia possesses that certain poison, which she uses gloves and specially altered clothes to suppress. As Isaac is involved in a terrorist plot along with a secret organisation known only as Twilight, many out there wish to capture her for the Horologium.
2	"The Strongest Stalker"; Transliteration: "Za sutorongesuto sutōkā" (Japanese: ザ・ストロンゲスト・ストーカー)	October 14, 2017
The next day, Cardia is introduced to Saint-Germain, the aristocrat who is the owner of the mansion. Wishing to let Cardia see the world, the men take her out on a steam-engine to the streets of London in disguise, where Victor and Impey buy supplies and Lupin shows her around, leaving Saint at the mansion. Noticing that they are being followed, an attempt to lose their pursuers in a deserted alleyway leads to a confrontation between them and soldiers working for Twilight. After their defeat, they come face-to-face with another man holding two shotguns. He wishes to use Cardia as bait, but Lupin manages to meet up with Impey and Victor. Rammed into a corner, Victor offers a deal to the man, whom he recognises as Abraham Van Helsing, a marvellous soldier and fighter. Through much deliberation and convincing, Abraham accepts the deal on the condition that he gets to take the life of Finis, the leader of Twilight who harbours connections with the Queen Victoria herself.
3	"Vampire Requiem"; Transliteration: "Vuanpaia rekuiemu" (Japanese: ヴァンパイア・レクイエム)	October 21, 2017
The men resolve to teach Cardia basic skills in each of the fields that they specialise in so she can be more useful. Recently, a "phantom thief" has been robbing sacred vampire treasures, and the reward for sending him to the royal palace is five million dollars. Seizing this as an opportunity after Saint admonishes them for splurging, they set out to catch the thief, who, thanks to Lupin, has managed to pinpoint his next target down to a pendant known as Nosferatu's Saber famed for being worn by the king of vampires Delacroix I himself. As predicted, the thief appears, showing himself to be a vampire child and the son of Delacroix I, Delacroix II. Abraham confronts him, which the latter proposes revenge as the former had killed his parents during a vampire hunt in England. Abraham defeats the vampire boy easily, and Cardia, taking pity on him, asks that they let him stay at the mansion.
4	"Train Snatch"; Transliteration: "Torein sunacchi" (Japanese: トレイン・スナッチ)	October 28, 2017
Lupin puts out bold strategies to capture Finis, who is planning to head for an inspection by train. Disguising themselves, Lupin and Cardia infiltrate the back cabin of the train while Impey is stationed elsewhere to pick up the team as they make their escape. Abraham helps clear the cabins of soldiers as Saint is positioned to make sure their plan goes well. The two are then confronted by Herlock Sholmes, a private detective hired by Queen Victoria to observe and escort Finis. Cardia heads to the back of the train to disable the last cabin where Finis is riding in, succeeding with ease as Arséne manages to get away by getting aboard Impey's aircraft. However, they are informed too late by Saint that their plan had failed. Finis, along with a guard named Aleister, ambushes Cardia and Abraham in his cabin, revealing that he was the one who had cunningly orchestrated everything by leaking information, as well as being Cardia's younger brother. As Impey heads back to the train while being chased by a British aircraft, they save the two trapped on the train and return to the mansion.
5	"Negotiated Solution"; Transliteration: "Negoshieiteddo soryūshon" (Japanese: ネゴシエイテッド・ソリューション)	November 4, 2017
By the hands of Finis, the entire team except for Cardia is made "Wanted" criminals for terrorism after the train-bombing incident. After their pictures have been posted on the headlines of the London newspapers, Victor, disturbed, leaves the house that night after being shut up in his lab without eating anything. Following him, Cardia realizes that he is attempting to negotiate with Queen Victoria to get his and his team's Wanted status revoked, as he had once previously held the Queen's confidence by being the Head Royal Alchemist. As dawn breaks, the pair is chased by the royal guards and Twilight soldiers until Lupin and Abraham arrive to save them. With Cardia and Victor on board Impey's revamped aircraft, they head to Buckingham Palace, where Victor threatens the Queen that he will leak out secret poison Zicterium he was forced to create to annihilate the vampires. As the Queen removes their charges, Victor reveals that in his past, in his quest to create the famed Philosopher's Stone, he had instead created a deadly poison. After Victor left the palace, Isaac took over the project and subsequently created the Horologium.
6	"Illegal Race"; Transliteration: "Irīgaru rēsu" (Japanese: イリーガル・レース)	November 11, 2017
As the annual Black Gathering, an airship race sponsored by mafia organisations, is held, they participate on Saint's orders with Impey's rebuilt aircraft, hoping to get a clue by winning the competition and subsequently its rumoured grand prize: the posthumous writings of Isaac. However, work on it only finishes that very day, causing them to barely catch the race start time. Participating alongside him is an eccentric scientist named Nemo who declared Victor as his rival when they were both serving in the royal court. As Lupin had stolen several parts from other sources, its owners recognise it and a heated battle ensues as money will be granted to whoever knocks it down. Crashing the other aircraft, Impey goes for an emergency crash-land on the finish line as the engine overheats, winning the race.
7	"Forgiveness for the Past"; Transliteration: "Itsuka no Yurushi" (Japanese: いつかの許し)	November 18, 2017
After visiting Isaac's laboratory, Cardia realizes that she is a homunculus, a life form created by humans. Shocked and frightened, she departs the mansion in an attempt to find her former home to check its identity, recollecting how she was pursued as a monster by the villagers back in Wales, her hometown. While running, she met a woman called Elaine who invited Cardia into her home without fear, and even treated her injury, until the villagers stormed her house and caused it to collapse. Etty, Elaine's daughter, was taken to safety by the villagers, but Elaine died in the rubble, causing Etty to hate Cardia. In the present, Cardia finds a letter addressed to herself from her father just as the villagers begin attempting to drive her out after Etty informs them of her continued existence. Lupin arrives just in time to save her and they camp out in the forest. There, he reveals how his teacher, who had taught him his values and judgement, died with a deep regret that he knew of Isaac's plot but did nothing to stop it, so Lupin decides to do the deed for him. After the night has passed, Etty informs the pair secretly that the villagers are lying in wait at a path in the forest before running away, as Cardia smiles happily through tears. On their way back, Cardia shows Lupin her father's letter, which consists of papers with mathematical formulae, and a normal letter regarding the code name of Isaac's terrorist group --- Code: Realize --- and its base --- St. Paul's Cathedral.
8	"The Flames of War"; Transliteration: "Senka" (Japanese: 戦火)	November 25, 2017
The rest of the gang searches for Cardia in London as an explosion suddenly occurs in the city, signaling Finis' move and Isaac's terrorism. As Cardia meets up with the others, Saint meets with Guinevere, a female friend and member of Idea, an organisation devoted to overseeing history. Arséne and Cardia escape with Queen Victoria and her general as the rest face off against the rebel forces and Twilight soldiers. As Lupin is injured protecting her, Finis provokes Cardia on London Bridge. Meanwhile, the rest of the gang arrive on Impey's aircraft.
9	"Prayer"; Transliteration: "Inori" (Japanese: 祈り)	December 2, 2017
London is occupied by Finis by a coup d'état. In addition, he is attempting to progress the plan of "Code: Realize". Meanwhile, Saint appears before Cardia, calling himself an "apostle of Idea". He tells Cardia she is the key to activating "Code: Realize", and his mission is to take her life. Van comes upon the damaged Lupin, who tells Van he worries that Cardia is suffering.
10	"Promise"; Transliteration: "Yakusoku" (Japanese: 約束)	December 9, 2017
A British army advances to St. Paul's Cathedral, the home of Twilight. Lupin and van also race to the cathedral, but Van's former superior Aleister is waiting for them an blocking their path. Van faces him to allow Lupin to go on ahead, but it is a struggle, as his opponent is familiar with his all of his moves. Meeting up with Saint, Lupin rushes ahead. When they reach the center, there find a huge celestial globe, and Finis appears. Van approaches Finis to extract information...
11	"Code：Realize"	December 16, 2017
Cardia is trapped in Nautilus. Lupin desperately thinks about a way to get her back, but there is no technique to defeat the big fortress powered by Nemo. Lupin attempts to get in alone, but Victor stops him, expressing that he, too, wants to grant Cardia's wish of being able to touch. Victor proposes a method to save Cardia and the world; with the cooperation of Saint, Idea and the British Army, Lupin challenges the Nautilus.
12	"Warmth"; Transliteration: "Nukomori" (Japanese: ぬくもり)	December 23, 2017
Cardia is taken into the celestial globe, where she sees Isaac, her father. She witnesses one of his memories, in which a great tragedy triggered him to concoct "Code:Realize". As Cardia is about to be consumed by Isaac's ambitions, she is rescued by Lupin, who then turns to face Isaac. However, "Code: Realize" has already been achieved, and Isaac declares himself a god who controls the world. In the end, though, Isaac is defeated, and sometime later Lupin and Cardia marry.
OVA	"Set a Thief to Catch a Thief"	May 17, 2018
For an upcoming celebration, everyone in the team tries to get a gift for Cardia. While looking for one, Lupin is framed for the robbery of a precious jewel Queen Victoria was to bestow to a serviceman in a ceremony a few days away. He then sets out to prove his innocence with the help of the others.

=== Stage musical ===
A Code: Realize stage musical was announced at the "Code: Realize Fantastic Party" event in April 2017.
