= Sakevisual =

Video game developer

- Industry: visual novels
- Founded: 2010
- Founder: Ayu Sakata
- Headquarters: United States
- Website: www.sakevisual.com

Sakevisual (stylized as sakevisual) is a developer and publisher of interactive story games such as visual novels and otome games, well known for their otome game RE: Alistair++. Their games are for Windows, macOS and Linux. Sakevisual is a partner of Hanako Games, Winter Wolves, and Tycoon Games.

== History ==
Sakevisual was founded by Ayu Sakata. On July 28, 2009, The Cute, Light and Fluffy Project was released, an anthology of short stories made by different people; Ayu Sakata's short story in this is called Cuter Than Fiction. Their first release was the freeware otome game, RE: Alistair. On April 10, 2010, they released an updated version with more scenes and additional content called RE: Alistair++. Sakevisual continues to release free games, but in 2010, they introduced the Green Tea Line, a series of commercial games. Ayu Sakata also wrote the stories for The Flower Shop and The Flower Shop: Winter in Fairbrook, visual novels by Winter Wolves. The Flower Shop was released on January 28, 2010, the sequel The Flower Shop: Winter in Fairbrook was released on December 8, 2011. They won the award for the "Best Fanbase" in 2011 by IndieDB.

Jisei and Kansei are the first two entries in the Green Tea Line and the first two installments of the Jisei Murder Mystery Series. Jisei and Kansei both received positive feedback in regards to its visual aspects, although reviewers agreed that the actual mysteries in the games needed work. The third installment Yousei was released on February 1, 2013. There are currently five installments planned.

Sakevisual plans to release more free games in the future; Oneiro a mystery otome game, Hanami X2 another otome game which is set in the Heian period and Every Sunrise the sequel to Ripples. Furthermore, they announced another untitled project that will be part of the Green Tea Line and therefore commercial and a new free game, Swan's Melody, with an unknown release date.

In 2013, they announced that besides Yousei they would like to release two free games and one commercial game this year. The also announced that the new game in the Green Tea Line is called Backstage Pass and is set in the same universe as RE: Alistair. It was released in August 2016.

== Games ==
=== Free Games ===
Name	Year	Language(s)	Platforms	Description
Ripples	2008	English, French, German, Russian, Slovak, Turkish	Android, iOS, Linux, macOS, Windows	A visual novel in which an idealistic Kuu meets nihilistic Koda in a park.
[text] - A Summer Story	2009	English, French, German, Russian	Linux, macOS, Windows	[text] is a free sound novel. A young girl named Maya finds a new friend while she is on vacation. Her uncle gave his mobile phone to a boy and so Maya texts with him.
RE: Alistair	2010	Chinese English, German, Portuguese, Russian, Spanish	Linux, macOS, Windows	Merui Lucas, a highschool girl, is playing an online game when a rare item is stolen from her within the game. She discovers that the culprit is one of three male students attending her high school. When the thief discovers her identity, he taunts her, leading to her making a bet with him. If Merui can discover his identity within thirty days, he will return her stolen game item.
My Magical Cosplay Cafe	2011	English, German, Russian	Linux, macOS, Windows	Takeshi is the chef at the Magical Cosplay Cafe. Every day, he gets to be around girls who work at the cafe with him and he wants to find a girlfriend. The game was intended to be a joke for April Fool's.

=== Green Tea Line ===
Jisei Murder Mystery Series

Name	Year	Language(s)	Platforms	Description
Jisei	2010	English, French, German, Portuguese, Russian, Spanish	Android, Linux, macOS, Nintendo Switch, PlayStation 4, Windows, Xbox One	A young teenager with no name and no home has the unique ability to relive the death of any corpse that he touches. When he stumbles upon a dead woman, he's immediately branded as the primary suspect in a murder investigation.
Kansei	2011	English, French, German, Japanese, Russian, Spanish	Android, Linux, macOS, Nintendo Switch, PlayStation 4, PlayStation 5, Windows, Xbox One, Xbox Series	The story follows the journey of a teenager with the ability to relive the death of any corpse he touches. He finds himself tangled in another murder case when the owner of a high profile corporation dies under mysterious circumstances. This time, however, he's forced to team up with a group of kids with abilities as strange as his own.
Yousei	2013	English, Russian	Linux, macOS, Windows	Kangai and his group are sent undercover to a local university where they must dig up the remains of a top secret experiment. Upon arrival, they discover the project lead missing, and an old acquaintance racing them for the same information.
Shinsei	2022	English	Linux, macOS, Windows	

Other Games

Name	Year	Language(s)	Platforms	Description
Backstage Pass	2016	Chinese, English, Russian	Linux, macOS, Windows	An otome game about show business. The four main love interests are a musician/singer, an actor, a model, and a magician. The gameplay is similar to RE: Alistair, although it covers a year's worth of time instead of just a month.

=== Other Games ===
Name	Year	Language(s)	Platforms	Description
The Cute, Light and Fluffy Project	2009	English, Russian, German	Linux, macOS, Windows	An anthology of four short stories. Ayu Sakata's short story in this is Cuter Than Fiction.
The Flower Shop: Summer in Fairbrook	2010	English	iOS, Linux, macOS, Windows	A visual novel by Winter Wolves. Ayu Sakata wrote the story for the game.
The Flower Shop: Winter in Fairbrook	2011	English	Linux, macOS, Windows	Another visual novel by Winter Wolves and the sequel to The Flower Shop. Ayu Sakata wrote the story for this game, too.
Cinders	2012	English	macOS, Windows	A visual novel adaption of the Cinderella story by MoaCube.
