= Loren the Amazon Princess =

2012 video game

Loren The Amazon Princess
- Developer: Winter Wolves
- Publisher: Winter Wolves
- Engine: Ren'Py
- Platforms: Linux, Mac OS X, Microsoft Windows, Android, iOS
- Release: Linux, Mac OS X, Windows; April 30, 2012; Android; September 19, 2013 iOS; January 15, 2014
- Genres: Role-playing, visual novel
- Mode: Single-player

Loren The Amazon Princess is a Fantasy RPG visual novel by Italian independent studio Winter Wolves. The game was released on April 30, 2012. The game was released for Linux, Mac OS X, Microsoft Windows, Android, and iOS. The expansion The Castle Of N'mar was released on September 28, 2012. A spin-off titled Tales of Aravorn: Seasons of the Wolf was released on November 15, 2014

== Gameplay ==
The game offers a mix of classic visual novel gameplay, with RPG elements. The player reads through the story and occasionally has to fight against fantasy monsters. At the beginning the player can choose between a male human protagonist and a female elven protagonist. Furthermore, it offers a variety of romance options with the party members, including homosexual relationships, and has different endings, based on the choices of the player and the relationships.

Battles can take place between the player's party and a party of enemies, with a maximum of six characters on each side. Each party consists of a front row, that is typically occupied by warrior type characters and can be attacked by anyone, and a back row, which typically holds weaker ranged and magical characters, that melee characters can only attack if the front row is unoccupied, in which case all on the back row will be forced to the front. Characters are able to swap places with others, or can move into unoccupied spaces on their turn, and warriors can gain the ability to force a character to swap with the one behind them.

Characters take it in turns to attack, with their speed, as well as the moves they use, determining how long they must wait. When a character's turn comes up, they have the choice of either attacking an enemy with their equipped weapon or abilities, using an ability to support the party, using an item for either healing or offense, or switching places. Should everyone in the player's party be killed, the player can reload a previous save. The player does not have the option of fleeing a battle, but should they win, the health and MP of all characters will be completely refilled, except at certain points of the story. As the player gains more followers, exceeding the maximum number of people they can have in a battle, they can reorganise the battle group outside of battles.

Characters are divided into three classes, the first two of which can be selected for the player character: Warriors, who possess powerful melee moves and can wear heavy armor, but are largely limited to attacking enemies in the front row, Thieves, who can wield bows to shoot at any enemy, and have skillsets focused on taking advantage of enemies being put into weakened states, and Mages, who have access to magic attacks that can hit multiple enemies wherever they are, but have less endurance than the other classes. In addition, each character has a specialization giving them a further variety of abilities, e.g. both Loren and Amukiki are warriors, however Loren's specialization gives her abilities based around dual-wielding weapons, while Amukiki's gives him ones that focus on supporting the player's party. Whatever class the player character has, their specialization will always focus on healing abilities.

== Plot ==
The game begins with Loren, the princess of the Amazons, who has to find her mother, Karen, the queen of the Amazons, who has gone missing. She starts her journey with the protagonist, a slave of the Amazons with healing magic. Since Amazon law forbids a princess from leaving their home, the Citadel, Loren is forced to renounce her princesshood, and with it her access to the Amazons assets.

On their journey they are joined by a variety of companions, including the dwarves Ramas and Dora, the half-elf Draco, the Elder Druid Myrth and the elf assassin Rei. Ultimately they find Karen, discovering that she had attempted to run away with her slave, who she had fallen in love with, and was killed by lizardmen. While on the journey, Loren takes possession of the Hawk Blade, a sword that Myrth explains is a weapon granted by the Gods, and that for Loren to have it means that she will have a huge impact on the world.

Grob, a servant of the Death Knight Fost, tricks the Human Empire and the Elves of GrandTree into going to war with one another, supposedly to keep them distracted from his plans. Archwizard Apolimesho and Myrth, representing the humans and elves respectively, discover the treachery and ask Loren and her comrades to end the war. They proceed to find proof that Fost has returned and that the demons of Everburn are a more important threat than either side in the war, and an alliance is agreed on between the two races and the Amazons.

After disagreements between the elves and humans threaten to fracture the alliance, it is decided that Loren should be in command of the combined forces. To convince the elven and human leaders of this, the party kill Krul, a nomad who has been harassing the human city of Horus with his orc army, as well as the succubus Jul, a servant of Fost who has bewitched the dark elves. Upon returning to the Citadel, they discover the Amazons have been afflicted with a magical plague, forcing them to work with the dark witch Chambara to develop a cure. Once this is concluded, the party learn that both sides have been forced to give control of their armies to Loren.

The alliance invades Everburn, forcing their way to Fost's castle. During the invasion, Loren, Karen and the protagonist learn from Apolimesho that in order to destroy Fost for good, one of them must sacrifice themselves to do so. As the party storms the castle, a ceiling collapses, sending the party into the Under-Realm, a plane of existence between the mortal world and the afterlife. The protagonist makes their way through the Under-Realm, before encountering Fost, and facing him along with Loren, Karen and whatever members of their party they had managed to recover. After defeating Fost, the protagonist must choose whether to stop Loren or Karen from sacrificing themselves, or to do so themself.

Whatever choice is made, an epilogue shows the fates of all the party members and those who helped them. If the protagonist did not sacrifice themself, they are revealed to be the writer of the story mentioned at the start of the game, whereas if they did, the writer is Loren.

== Development ==
The game was created with Ren'Py. It features a theme song by Cristina Vee, composed by Matthew Myers: Until I'm Broken. The original idea and the storyboard was invented by Celso Riva, while the writing was done by Aleema. The art was done by Shiver M., Teodoro Gonzalez, Goran Kostadinoski, and Peter Petkov. Battle voice director was Ayu Sakata. An official trailer for the game was released on May 22, 2012.

== Expansion and sequel ==
The expansion of the game The Castle Of N'mar was released on September 28, 2012. The expansion offers four new party members (Mesphit, Sauzer, Chambara, and Trouble), new romance options for Meshpit and Chambara, new locations, including the Castle of N'mar, and new story events. A direct sequel to Loren the Amazon Princess is in development and was expected for a release in 2016 or 2017, only to be pushed to a 2018 or 2019 release.

== Spin-off ==
A spin-off titled Tales of Aravorn: Seasons of the Wolf was released on November 15, 2014. The game is set in the same universe as Loren the Amazon Princess and features new characters and locations. The story is centered around the siblings Althea and Shea who live in the northern regions of Aravorn.

== Reception ==
The game received a score of 83/100 on TechnologyTell, with reviewer Jenni Lada writing: "While I'll admit I bristled a bit at the fan-service in Loren: Amazon Princess, even with the censor option turned on, it's worth overlooking as the battle system is well arranged and challenging and the overall story of a young man or woman rising from slavery to become second in command of an army that will help save the world is very well done. I especially liked how the decisions, mostly those made in the fourth chapter, did influence the ending and epilogue. While it may be a bit expensive and is definitely only for mature audiences, it's well made, tells an interesting tale and I could honestly see playing through it a second time to see what effect different choices would have on the story." Capsule Computers review gave 8.5 of 10 points to the game and wrote: "Loren: The Amazon Princess is a solidly built game and it has a lot of different options and choices for players to work through. The game totes how a player can't do it all in one playthrough and even the romance aside, it can't be. Featuring a heck of a lot of replay value, this game provides plenty of hours of enjoyment and what is actually about two novels of game text."
