= Apphia Yu =

American voice actress

- Born: October 9
- Other name: Ayu Sakata
- Occupation: Voice actress
- Years active: 2009–present
- Spouse: Micah Solusod (m. 2016)
- Website: apphiayu.com

Apphia Yu (born October 9), also known as Ayu Sakata, is an American voice actress and voice director. She has worked on games such as Loren The Amazon Princess and Tales of Aravorn: Seasons of the Wolf, and on anime like Assassination Classroom. She is the founder of sakevisual, a company based in Dallas, Texas that makes original visual novel games. She is married to voice actor Micah Solusod.

== Filmography ==
=== Anime series ===
List of voice performances in anime series
Year	Title	Role	Notes	Source
2011	Fairy Tail	Laki Olietta		
2012	Shangri-La	Mikuni		
2012	Level E	Mayuzumi (Black Ranger)		
2012	Shakugan no Shana Second	Tiriel		
2013	Last Exile: Fam, the Silver Wing	Félicité		
2013	Guilty Crown	Kanon Kusama		
2013	Robotics;Notes	Airi		
2014	Kamisama Kiss	Chie		
2014	A Certain Scientific Railgun S	Saiai Kinuhata		
2015	Assassination Classroom	Rio Nakamura		
2015	Mikagura School Suite	Katai		
2016	Rage of Bahamut: Genesis	Rita		
2016	Shōnen Maid	Chihiro		
2016	Love Live! Sunshine!!	You Watanabe		
2016	Barakamon	Tama		
2016	Show By Rock!! 2	Holmy	Also Short!!	
2016	Drifters	Mark		
2016	Touken Ranbu: Hanamaru	Monoyoshi Sadamune		
2017	Dragon Ball Z Kai: The Final Chapters	Imamu		
2017	ēlDLIVE	Tonto		
2017	Chain Chronicle: The Light of Haecceitas	Marina		
2017	Koro Sensei Quest!	Nakamura		
2017	Fuuka	Haruka Akitsuki		
2017	Kenka Bancho Otome -Girl Beats Boys-	Hinako	Lead role	
2017	The Silver Guardian	Koshiriko		
2017	Alice & Zoroku	Ayumu Miho		
2017	Tsukigakirei	Akane	Lead role	
2017	Tsugumomo	Kukuri		
2017	Gosick	Victorique de Blois	Lead role	
2017	Recovery of an MMO Junkie	Harth		
2017	Myriad Colors Phantom World	Haruhiko (child)		
2017	Star Blazers: Space Battleship Yamato 2199	Jiro Shima		
2017	Garo: Vanishing Line	Meifang		
2017	Blood Blockade Battlefront & Beyond	Kane		
2018	Pop Team Epic	Shouta Aoi		
2018	Ace Attorney	Miles Edgeworth (young)		
2018	Katana Maidens: Toji No Miko	Sayaka		
2018	Cardcaptor Sakura: Clear Card	Spinny		
2018	Dragon Ball Super	Maki		
2018	Black Clover	Marie		
2018	Golden Kamuy	Osoma		
2018	Free! -Dive to the Future-	Ayumu		
2018	Tokyo Ghoul:re (season 2)	Shio		
2018	Code: Realize − Guardian of Rebirth	Sisi		
2018	SSSS.Gridman	Borr		
2018	A Certain Magical Index III	Kinuhata		
2019	Fruits Basket (2019 TV series)	Shigure Soma (young)		
2019	Dr. Stone	Tsukasa Shishio (young)		
2019	Nichijou - My Ordinary Life	Sekiguchi		
2019	Kemono Friends	Ezo Red Fox		
2019	Kase-san and Morning Glories	Mikawa		
2019	My Hero Academia	Tamaki Amajiki (young)		
2020	Food Wars!: Shokugeki no Soma	Berta, Cilla		
2020	Higurashi: When They Cry – GOU	Rika Furude	Main role; Also SOTSU	
2021	Mieruko-chan	Yamazaki		
2022	PuraOre! Pride of Orange	Junko Yaginuma		
2024	Fairy Tail: 100 Years Quest	Laki Olietta		

=== Animated series ===
- RWBY (2016-2017), Young Lie Ren
- Heaven Official's Blessing (2021), Xiao Ying

=== Films ===
List of voice performances in film
Year	Title	Role	Notes	Source
2018	Assassination Classroom the Movie: 365 Days' Time	Nakamura		
2022	Sing a Bit of Harmony	Inoue		

=== Video games ===
List of voice performances in video games
Year	Title	Role	Notes	Source
2016	Dragon Ball Xenoverse 2	Time Patroller		
2017	Regalia: Of Men and Monarchs	Lilka		
2017	A Hat in Time	Hat Kid/Bow Kid		
2025	Zenless Zone Zero	Coco		

== Production credits ==
=== ADR directing ===
List of ADR directing credits
Year	Title	Role	Notes	Source
2015	Assassination Classroom	S1: Assistant ADR director; S2: ADR director		
2016	The Disastrous Life of Saiki K.	ADR director	Funimation dub, Season 1	
2017	Koro Sensei Quest!	ADR director		
2017	Classroom of the Elite	ADR director		
2017	Code: Realize − Guardian of Rebirth	Assistant ADR director		
2018	Lord of Vermilion: The Crimson King	Assistant ADR director		
2018	Harukana Receive	ADR director	Shared with Jerry Jewell	
2018	Assassination Classroom the Movie: 365 Days' Time	ADR director		
2018	RErideD – Derrida, who leaps through time –	Assistant ADR director		
2019	The Quintessential Quintuplets	ADR director		
2020	Higurashi: When They Cry – GOU	Assistant ADR director		
2021	SSSS.Dynazenon	ADR director		
2021	Ikebukuro West Gate Park	Additional ADR direction		
2025–present	Detective Conan	ADR director		
