= The Royal Trap =

2013 video game

- Developer: Hanako Games
- Publisher: Hanako Games
- Engine: Ren'Py
- Platforms: Windows, Mac OS X, Linux
- Release: WW: February 23, 2013
- Genre: Visual novel
- Mode: Single player

The Royal Trap is a visual novel developed and published by Hanako Games on February 23, 2013, for Windows, Mac OS and Linux. The story of the game follows a young companion who has to take care of her prince, Oscar. The game uses anime-style graphics and is written in English. On June 15, 2013, the DVD version of The Royal Trap was released, which also contains a HD version of the game, as well as exclusive concept sketches. It was re-released in April 2015 for Steam with new background art, a higher resolution, and some expanded content. The Steam release also added a subtitle, "The Confines of the Crown"; in 2017, the game on Steam was changed to be advertised as only The Confines of the Crown without "The Royal Trap."

== Gameplay ==
The player reads through the story and makes decisions at crucial points. Based on the decisions the player chooses, the plot differs and influences the outcome of the story. The game is divided into seven chapters. While the first four chapters are similar, the game splits into four different plots starting from chapter five. Each of these branches have a number of different endings based on how Madeleine acts in them. During the course of the game, the player also unlocks artwork, which can be viewed in a gallery.

== Plot ==
Madeleine Valois is the companion of prince Oscar of Ocendawyr; her job is to guide and advise him, as well as serve as a bodyguard. One day he is invited to present himself as a potential suitor to the princess of a rival kingdom: Princess Cassidy. She is the heiress and future queen of Gwellinor. However, things in Gwellinor are not as they appear. Oscar, Madeleine, and other foreigners attend a party held in Cassidy's honor. During the party, Cassidy is kidnapped, and Oscar is accused of being involved in the crime. Madeleine takes the initiative and searches the castle, attempting to rescue the princess and clear Oscar's name.

The second half of the plot splits based on whom Madeleine gains as an ally. If she has enraged all parties, the plot ends in a "bad ending", but otherwise one of Oscar, Prince Calum (Cassidy's brother), or two foreign nobles also here to court Cassidy will ally with Madeleine to pursue both their own and Madeleine's goals.

== Development ==
The Royal Trap was developed by Hanako Games, which also created Cute Knight, Cute Knight Kingdom, Magical Diary, and Long Live the Queen. The game was created with the Ren'Py visual novel engine and features an opening theme written by Matthew Myers and performed by Natasha Cox of the band Mankind Is Obsolete. The character art was done by Yui Sumeragi, while the event CGs were created by AQU. The story and the code was developed by Papillion. The game's logo was designed by Jeff Zhao.

== Reception ==
Technology Tell's Jenni Lada rated the game "A", opining: "There's a depth to the characters and story that make it feel more real than other visual novels I've played and I found myself loving how strong Madeleine, Cassidy, Callum and other cast members were. The Royal Trap is a game people will want to play more than once and I think Hanako Games should be applauded for that." GameZebo's Neilie Johnson gave 4 out of 5 stars and wrote: "My attention was held from start to finish by its mature themes and convincing character exchanges, not to mention its impressive audio-visuals. So much so, that once I've gotten over the disappointing results of my first-try ending, I'll no doubt play through the whole thing again."
