= Doomed Love =

Doomed Love may refer to:

- Doomed Love (game), a point-and-click visual novel
- Doomed Love (novel), an 1862 Portuguese novel by Camilo Castelo
- Doomed Love (2008 film), a Portuguese film based on the novel
- Doomed Love (1983 film), an American musical film
- Doomed Love: A Journey through German Genre Films, a 2016 documentary film
