= Milk Outside a Bag of Milk Outside a Bag of Milk =

2021 video game

- Developer: Nikita Kryukov
- Publishers: Nikita Kryukov; Forever Entertainment
- Engine: Ren'Py
- Platforms: Windows; MacOS; Linux; Nintendo Switch
- Release: macOS, Linux, Windows: WW: December 16, 2021; Nintendo Switch: WW: November 11, 2022
- Genres: Psychological horror, visual novel
- Mode: Single player

Milk Outside a Bag of Milk Outside a Bag of Milk (stylized as Milk outside a bag of milk outside a bag of milk...) is a 2021 psychological horror visual novel developed and published by Russian indie game developer Nikita Kryukov. It is a direct sequel to Milk Inside a Bag of Milk Inside a Bag of Milk, continuing the story of its unnamed female protagonist. The game blends psychological horror elements with visual novel storytelling to explore her unsettling dreams, examining themes of isolation, trauma, and depression.

Released on December 16, 2021, Milk Outside a Bag of Milk Outside a Bag of Milk launched on Steam and itch.io, following the release of Milk Inside a Bag of Milk Inside a Bag of Milk on August 26, 2020. The games were later ported to Nintendo Switch by Forever Entertainment on November 11, 2022, as a bundle. Both titles are available on PC for Windows, macOS, and Linux.

== Plot ==
Milk Outside a Bag of Milk Outside a Bag of Milk picks up directly after the events of the first game. The game tells the story of a mentally ill girl as she struggles to understand her thoughts and reality through the exploration of her own dreams. The player assumes the role of an internal voice, guiding the girl as she attempts to process her trauma and surreal hardships.

== Gameplay ==
Gameplay screenshot

Gameplay in Milk Outside a Bag of Milk Outside a Bag of Milk is centered around dialogue choices and a brief point-and-click segment. For the rest of the game, players experience text-driven scenes illustrating her dreams. The game offers five possible endings, each presented as dream sequences, along with ten unlockable achievements.

== Reception ==
PC Gamer described Milk Outside a Bag of Milk Outside a Bag of Milk as a "short and visually striking adventure," giving special praise for avoiding a happy ending that would have otherwise undermined its story. Oliver Shellding of Way Too Many Games and Steven Licardi of Rely on Horror cited the game as an effective portrayal of mental health issues.
