= Exogen =

Exogen may refer to:

- an archaic term meaning a woody plant whose stem is formed by successive accretions to the outside of the wood under the bark; see Lindley system § Class VII: Exogens
- a phase in the life cycle of a hair follicle in which a hair exits the follicle

== See also ==
- Exogenesis (disambiguation)
- Exogeny
