= Ren'Py =

Game engine for the creation of visual novels

Ren'Py Visual Novel Engine
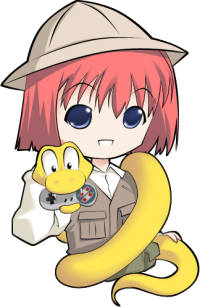
- Ren'Py's mascot, Eileen, surrounded by a python

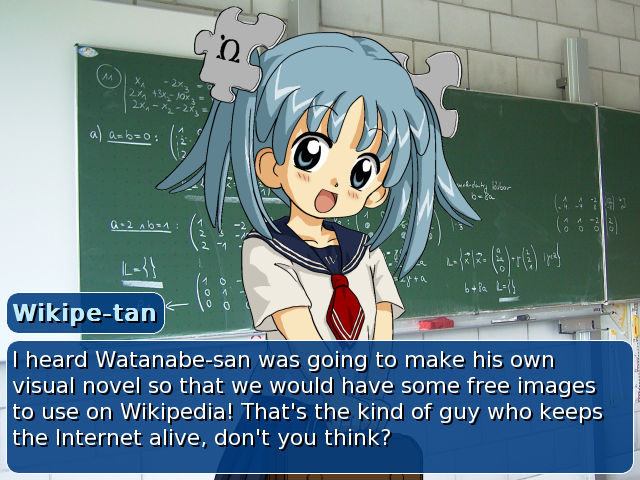
- An example of a Ren'Py-created scene
- Original author: Tom "PyTom" Rothamel
- Developer: Tom "PyTom" Rothamel
- Release: August 24, 2004; 22 years ago
- Stable release: 8.5.3 / May 15, 2026; 4 months ago
- Written in: Python, Cython
- Middleware: Pygame (LGPL); SDL (zlib); FreeType (FTL)
- Operating system: Windows, macOS, Linux, FreeBSD, OpenBSD, Android, iOS
- Size: 115 MB
- Available in: English for the engine – UTF-8 use for resulting programs
- Type: Game engine (visual novel)
- License: MIT
- Website: www.renpy.org
- Repository: github.com/renpy/renpy

Ren'Py, known in full as the Ren'Py Visual Novel Engine, is a free and open-source game engine which facilitates the creation of visual novels. It was developed for and targeted at multiple platforms, including Microsoft Windows and Linux.

The engine allows movie playback for animated sprites, full-screen movies, in-engine animation, and full animation and customization of UI elements via the feature "Screen Language". The Ren'Py software development kit is officially supported on Windows, Linux, and recent versions of macOS; and can be installed via the package managers of the Arch Linux, Ubuntu, Debian, and Gentoo Linux distributions. Ren'Py features a built-in tutorial game that demonstrates core features such as dialogue scripting, adding images, transitions, music and effects, branching choices, and other functionalities.

== Features ==
Ren'Py includes the ability to create branching stories, save file systems, rollback to previous points in the story, a variety of scene transitions, DLC, and so on. The engine also allows for movie playback for both full-screen movies and animated sprites, in-engine animation (using the built in "Animation and Translation Language", or ATL), and full animation and customization of UI elements via "Screen Language". Ren'Py scripts have a screenplay-like syntax, and can also include blocks of Python code to allow advanced users to add new features of their own. In addition, tools are included in the engine distribution to obfuscate scripts and archive game assets to mitigate copyright infringement.

Ren'Py is built on Pygame, which is built with Python on SDL. The Ren'Py SDK is officially supported on Windows, recent versions of macOS, and Linux; and can be installed via the package managers of the Arch Linux, Ubuntu, Debian, and Gentoo (in experimental overlay) Linux distributions. Ren'Py can build games for Windows, macOS, Linux, Android, OpenBSD, iOS, and HTML5 with WebAssembly.

Ren'Py includes a built-in tutorial game that demonstrates core features such as dialogue scripting, adding images, transitions, music and effects, branching choices, and other basic and advanced functionalities.

== Reception ==
Ren'Py had been recommended as a video game creation engine by several publications, including Indie Games Plus, MakeUseOf, PC Gamer, and The Guardian. Ren'Py has been used in classes at Carnegie Mellon School of Art, Faculty of Art at University Tunku Abdul Rahman, Kampar, Perak, Malaysia, and as a tool for information literacy.

== Notable games ==
List of notable games created in Ren'Py
Title	Genre(s)	Developer(s)	Publisher(s)	Release date (Note: Date of first completed public release, regardless of platform or region.)	Platform (Note: Some of these games have been ported to game consoles such as Nintendo Switch, PlayStation 4, and Xbox One, but those ports also involve porting them from Ren'Py to other game engines such as Unity, as Ren'Py is not directly supported on game consoles.)				
Title	Genre(s)	Developer(s)	Publisher(s)	Release date	And	iOS	LX	Mac	Win
Analogue: A Hate Story	Visual novel	Love Conquers All Games	Christine Love	February 1, 2012	No	No	Yes	Yes	Yes
Black Closet	Visual novel, Strategy RPG, Life simulation	Hanako Games	Hanako Games	September 16, 2015	No	No	Yes	Yes	Yes
Butterfly Soup	Visual novel, Romantic comedy	Brianna Lei	Brianna Lei	September 16, 2017	No	No	Yes	Yes	Yes
Café 0: The Drowned Mermaid	Visual novel, Mystery	ROSEVERTE	ROSEVERTE	October 4, 2011	Yes	Yes	Yes	Yes	Yes
Coming Out on Top	Visual novel, Dating sim	Obscurasoft	Obscurasoft	December 10, 2014	No	No	Yes	Yes	Yes
Date Warp	Visual novel, Science fiction	Spiky Caterpillar, Hanako Games	Hanako Games	May 22, 2010	No	No	Yes	Yes	Yes
A Date with Death	Visual novel, Dating sim	Two and a Half Studios	Two and a Half Studios	December 7, 2023	No	No	Yes	Yes	Yes
Digital: A Love Story	Visual novel	Love Conquers All Games	Christine Love	February 28, 2010	No	No	Yes	Yes	Yes
Doki Doki Literature Club!	Visual novel, Dating sim, Horror	Team Salvato	Team Salvato	September 22, 2017	Yes	Yes	Yes	Yes	Yes
don't take it personally, babe, it just ain't your story	Visual novel	Love Conquers All Games	Christine Love	April 4, 2011	No	No	Yes	Yes	Yes
Doomed Love	Point-and-click, Dating sim, Visual novel, Fangame	David B. Cooper	David B. Cooper	June 11, 2021	No	No	No	Yes	Yes
Dysfunctional Systems series	Visual novel	Dischan Media	Dischan Media	April 4, 2013	No	Yes	Yes	Yes	Yes
Exogenesis: Perils of Rebirth demo	Adventure game, Visual novel, Sci-fi	Kwan	Sekai Project	April 19, 2019	No	No	Yes	Yes	Yes
Fatal Hearts	Visual novel, Adventure game, Otome	Hanako Games	Hanako Games	October 23, 2007	No	No	No	No	Yes
Fault Milestone One	Visual novel	Alice in Dissonance	Sekai Project	August 12, 2013	No	No	Yes	Yes	Yes
Fault Milestone Two	Visual novel	Alice in Dissonance	Sekai Project	August 16, 2015	No	No	Yes	Yes	Yes
The Flower Shop series	Visual novel	Winter Wolves	Winter Wolves	February 1, 2010	Yes	Yes	Yes	Yes	Yes
Heart of the Woods	Visual novel	Studio Élan	Studio Élan	February 15, 2019	No	No	Yes	Yes	Yes
Heileen series	Visual novel	Tycoon Games	Tycoon Games	October 21, 2008	Yes	Yes	Yes	Yes	Yes
Juniper's Knot	Visual novel	Dischan Media	Dischan Media	April 4, 2013	No	No	Yes	Yes	Yes
Katawa Shoujo	Visual novel, Nakige	Four Leaf Studios	Four Leaf Studios	January 4, 2012	No	No	Yes	Yes	Yes
Ladykiller in a Bind	Visual novel, Eroge, Romantic comedy	Love Conquers All Games	Christine Love	October 10, 2016	No	No	Yes	Yes	Yes
Long Live the Queen	Visual novel, RPG, Political simulation	Spiky Caterpillar, Hanako Games	Hanako Games	June 2, 2012	No	No	Yes	Yes	Yes
Loren the Amazon Princess	RPG, Visual novel, Fantasy	Winter Wolves	Winter Wolves	April 30, 2012	Yes	Yes	Yes	Yes	Yes
Magical Diary	Visual novel, Fantasy, Otome	Spiky Caterpillar, Hanako Games	Hanako Games	June 19, 2011	No	No	Yes	Yes	Yes
Milk inside a bag of milk inside a bag of milk series	Visual novel	Nikita Kryukov	Missing Calm	August 26, 2020	No	No	Yes	Yes	Yes
Momotype	Visual novel, Digital pet	Rimatoad	Rimatoad	December 3, 2021	No	No	Yes	Yes	Yes
One Night Stand	Visual novel	Kinmoku	Kinmoku	October 20, 2016	No	No	Yes	Yes	Yes
Planet Stronghold	Visual novel, RPG, Sci-fi	Winter Wolves	Winter Wolves	February 28, 2011	Yes	Yes	Yes	Yes	Yes
Raptor Boyfriend	Visual novel, Dating sim	Rocket Adrift	Rocket Adrift	July 15, 2021	No	No	Yes	Yes	Yes
Roadwarden	Visual novel, adventure	Moral Anxiety Studio	Assemble Entertainment	September 12, 2022	No	No	Yes	Yes	Yes
The Royal Trap	Visual novel	Hanako Games	Hanako Games	February 23, 2013	No	No	Yes	Yes	Yes
Scarlet Hollow	Visual novel, Horror	Black Tabby Games	Black Tabby Games	June 11, 2021	No	No	Yes	Yes	Yes
Slay the Princess	Visual novel, Horror	Black Tabby Games	Black Tabby Games	October 23, 2023	No	No	Yes	Yes	Yes
Stories from Sol: The Gun-Dog	Visual novel, adventure	Space Colony Studios	Astrolabe Games, Meridiem Games	February 20, 2025	No	No	Yes	No	Yes
Summer Session	Dating sim	Hanako Games, Tycoon Games	Hanako Games, Tycoon Games	July 2, 2008	No	No	Yes	Yes	Yes
Tales of Aravorn: Seasons of the Wolf	Visual novel, RPG, Fantasy	Winter Wolves	Winter Wolves	November 15, 2014	Yes	Yes	Yes	Yes	Yes
Vera Blanc series	Visual novel, Mystery	Winter Wolves	Winter Wolves	June 30, 2010	Yes	Yes	Yes	Yes	Yes

== See also ==
- List of visual novel engines
