= Ebenezer Olatunde Farombi =

Nigerian professor of biochemistry

- Born: Osogbo Nigeria
- Citizenship: Nigeria
- Education: University of Ibadan
- Children: 3
- Awards: 2014 SOT Global Senior Toxicology Award
- Scientific career
- Fields: Medical Sciences
- Workplaces: University of Ibadan

Ebenezer Olatunde Farombi is a Nigerian professor of Biochemistry and Toxicology at the Faculty of Basic Medical Sciences, College of Medicine, University of Ibadan. He is the Dean of the college and also the director, Molecular Drug Metabolism and Toxicology Laboratories in the University. He is a member of the Nigerian Academy of Science.

== Early life and education ==
Farombi obtained his first bachelor of science in 1987, his master of science in 1990 and his Doctor of Philosophy in 1995 from the University of Ibadan.

== Academic career ==
Ebenezer Olatunde Farombi began his academic career as a graduate assistant at University of Ibadan in 1988. He became a Senior lecturer in 2000. He moved to university of Liverpool, England for postdoctoral training.

Farombi was a visiting professor to the National Research Laboratory of Molecular Carcinogenesis and Chemoprevention, Seoul National University (2005/2006), Department of Nutritional Toxicology.

== Personal life ==
Farombi is married to Temitope Farombi, a consultant neurologist at Gastric Center at University of Ibadan's College Hospital, they are living together with three children.

== Selected publications ==
- Exogenous taurine administration abates reproductive dysfunction in male rats exposed to silver nanoparticles
- Atrazine: cytotoxicity, oxidative stress, apoptosis, testicular effects and chemopreventive Interventions
- Metoprolol elicits neurobehavioral insufficiency and oxidative damage in nontarget Nauphoeta cinerea nymphs
- Cellular and molecular mechanisms of aflatoxin B1-mediated neurotoxicity: The therapeutic role of natural bioactive compounds
- Amelioration of neurobehavioral, biochemical, and morphological alterations associated with silver nanoparticles exposure by taurine in rats
- Co-administration of thymol and sulfoxaflor impedes the expression of reproductive toxicity in male rats
- Neurotoxicity of furan in juvenile Wistar rats involves behavioral defects, microgliosis, astrogliosis and oxidative stress

== Awards and honors ==
Farombi is a fellow of Nigerian Academy of Science NAS (2014). Director, Molecular Drug Metabolism and Toxicology Laboratories in the university. President of the Forum of Nigerian Toxicologists (FONTOX)

== Membership ==
Vice President, Society for Free Radical Research Africa (SFRR-Africa), immediate past Public Affairs Secretary of the Nigerian Academy of Science (NAS). Member of the Governing Council of the Apex Scientific body in Nigeria.
