= Dragontales =

Book series

Dragontales was a series of gamebooks written by Rhondi A. Vilott Salsitz as "Rhondi Vilott" and published by Signet in the 1980s. The books place the reader in the role of a young man or woman in various fantasy countries inhabited by a variety of extravagant creatures. The books were meant for readers somewhat older than those of most gamebooks, as romance is a common element, as are allusions to physical development in the books' heroines.

An interesting feature of the Dragontales series was that each odd-numbered book in the series had a white cover and featured a female protagonist, while each even-numbered book had a black cover and a male protagonist.

The first book was licensed and made into a visual novel video game by Hanako Games in early 2015.

== Books in the series ==
1. Sword Daughter's Quest (1984)
2. Runesword! (1984)
3. Challenge of the Pegasus Grail (1984)
4. The Towers of Rexor (1984)
5. The Unicorn Crown (1984)
6. Black Dragon's Curse (1984)
7. Spellbound (1984)
8. The Dungeons of Dregnor (1984)
9. Aphrodite's Mirror (1985)
10. Hall of the Gargoyle King (1985)
11. Maiden of Greenwold (1985)
12. Storm Rider (1985)
13. Pledge of Peril (1985)
14. Secret of the Sphinx (1985)
