= Momotype =

2021 video game

- Developer: Rimatoad
- Publisher: Rimatoad
- Programmer: Glazed Goose
- Composer: Amaranthine
- Engine: Ren'Py
- Platforms: Windows, MacOS, Linux
- Release: WW: December 3, 2021
- Genre: Visual novel
- Mode: Single player

Momotype is a short, free-to-play visual novel developed by Rimatoad and self-published to Steam on December 3, 2021. In the game, the player is tasked with the care of a Tamagotchi-inspired real-life virtual pet called Momo.

== Gameplay ==
Momotype is a visual novel, and as such its gameplay consists primarily of reading dialogue that is presented to the player and occasionally making a choice (the player gets to choose what meals to feed Momo, and what programs he's allowed to watch on TV), but these have no real outcome on how the game ends. Momotype is a game with three alternate endings, which follow in a linear order after each successive playthrough. A typical playthrough consists of three in-game days during which the player converses with Momo, and feeds and entertains them. During the night, the player experiences nightmares. On the third day, Momo mutates.

== Synopsis ==
The game takes place around a century in the future, in New Ribosome City. The world has been devastated by a plague and birth rates are at an all-time low. To combat the low birth rate, the government has started sponsoring a program where humans have to take care of a virtual pet that exist in the real world called "monotypes", in hopes of stirring up people's parental instincts. These monotypes (each of which is called "Momo") are developed by Imitato Corp., and are based on Tamagotchi-like virtual pets that were popular before the plague. A selection has been made of people who get to test the program for a week. The player character, an employee of Imitato Corp., is part of that selection.

== Reception ==
Zoey Handley from Destructoid called the short visual novel intriguing, writing that Momo's escalating emotional demands "go from cute to existentially traumatizing rather quickly" and that the visual novel is something that "almost needs to be seen to be believed". Joel Couture from Indie Games Plus likewise called the story intriguing, and found it an interesting take on how we take care of virtual pets, writing that in taking care of Momo you not only have to meet physical needs such as feeding it in time, but that it has emotional needs, too. Nathan Navrotzki from the German site Spieletipps.de called the game a hidden gem. He found the game to be unsettling, and despite its cute aesthetics unsuitable for children, likening it to Doki Doki Literature Club.
