= Summer Session =

2008 video game

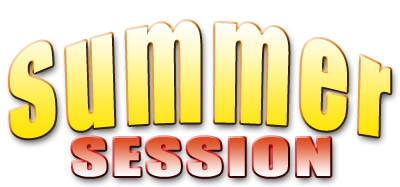
- Developers: Hanako Games, Tycoon Games
- Engine: Ren'Py
- Platforms: Microsoft Windows, Mac OS X, Linux
- Release: July 2, 2008
- Genre: Dating simulation
- Mode: Single-player

Summer Session is a dating simulation video game for the Microsoft Windows, Mac OS X and Linux platforms. The game was developed and published by Hanako Games and Italian studio Tycoon Games. It uses anime-style graphics and is written in English. It was released on July 2, 2008.

== Gameplay ==
Players must balance their schedules in order to raise their character's statistics and pass school examinations. During play they encounter non-player characters and befriend them, aiming to find romance. Restarting the game after completion enables players to unlock additional endings.

== Reception ==
Reviewers at Game Tunnel gave the game an average review score of 7.25/10, with the lowest review deriding it as "pervy" while the highest called the graphics "spectacular" and the writing "excellent", saying it "appealed to my inner otaku fanboy".

Emily Short of GameSetWatch said that the game "hit the narrative sweet spot".
