= Exogenesis =

Exogenesis may refer to:

- Exogenesis (astrobiology; similar to the idea of panspermia), the hypothesis that life originated elsewhere in the universe and was spread to Earth
- Exogenesis (Babylon 5), an episode of the science-fiction TV series Babylon 5
- Exogenesis: Symphony, a symphonic three-movement song by British alternative rock band Muse
- Exogenesis: Perils of Rebirth, an adventure game/visual novel
- Exogenesis (album)
