= Coming Out on Top =

2014 video game

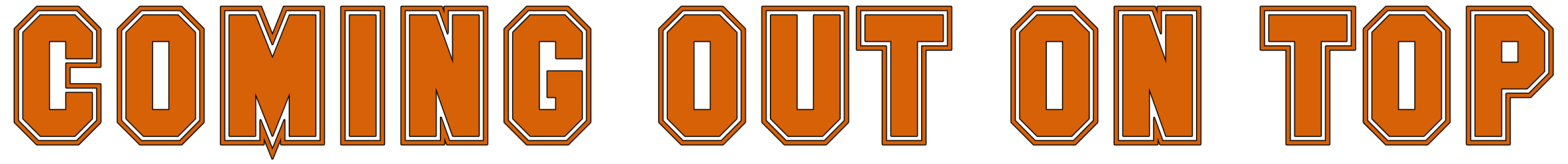
- Game logo
- Developer: Obscurasoft
- Publisher: Obscurasoft
- Engine: Ren'Py
- Platforms: Windows, Linux, macOS
- Release: WW: 10 December 2014
- Genres: Visual novel, dating sim
- Mode: Single-player

Coming Out on Top is a 2014 gay-themed dating sim interactive novel video game developed by Obscura (of Obscurasoft).

== Plot ==
The basic premise involves the main character, Mark Matthews (although this name is changeable), coming out to his two roommates Penny and Ian before the commencement of his final year of college, and the different men who enter into his life as a result of the choices he makes. He also has a pet fish, who he will confide in if he shuts other interactions out of his life; one plot concludes with the protagonist being sexually mounted by his pet fish. The storyline has elements of a porn game, with explicit or censored (depending on the version of the game the player is using) image of Mark and another character performing sexual acts being unlocked during each plotline. The player may begin the game by flirting with many guys, but midway through, all other interactions fall away while the strongest is pursued. The game concludes when Mark, Penny and Ian graduate college.

Main Dates

- Alex - Mark's anatomy professor at college and potential racquetball partner who is in contention for tenure at the University.
- Amos - an older man who is interested in wrestling, classic films and the poetry of Walt Whitman.
- Brad - a slacker, football player and frat bro who Mark is hired to tutor.
- Ian - Mark's roommate who has recently broken up with his girlfriend.
- Jed - the straight edge lead singer of a punk rock band who lives in the apartment above Mark, Penny and Ian.
- Phil - Penny's cousin who has just returned from the Marine Corps boot camp to support his father who is running for senate.

Brofinder Bonus Dates

- Cesar - a narcotics officer on Brofinder as part of a sting operation.
- Donovan - a middle aged father who is trying to get used to dating again following a divorce from his wife.
- Frank - a stripper that pretends to be a wealthy investor to impress Mark on their date.
- Jake - a foodie who invites Mark to an all-you-can-eat buffet where the pair become trapped in an elevator.
- Luke - an Irish rugby player that joins Brofinder to make friends and invites Mark to watch a movie at his dorm.
- Oz and Pete - a couple who are interested in spicing up their relationship with a threesome.
- Terry - a closeted pop star looking for discreet fun.
- Theo - a video game developer using Brofinder to meet a guy he can take to his high school reunion.
- Tommy - an affluent lawyer whose past mistake causes he and Mark to end up in a hostage situation.

== Gameplay ==
The gameplay is the same as other interactive novels. Players tap the screen/click the mouse to progress through the story, and can make choices at crucial moments. Alongside clicking to progress through the story to choose which man to date, the player also has the options to help Mark improve his relationships with Penny and Ian or improve his academic performance by studying and working to earn money. Once an erotic image has been unlocked during the game, it is available in the "gallery" and can be viewed at any time. The player also has the choice to customise the beard and body hair options for each of the men, tailoring each to their personal taste.

An update to the game allows Mark access to nine additional bonus dates which are initiated through the "Brofinder" app in the main menu and are much shorter than the dates in the main game and typically only unlock two or three images for the gallery.

== Development ==
The game was made as a result of a successful Kickstarter campaign. Obscura progressively released builds of the game for forum members to test and provide feedback.

Initially conceived as a Western equivalent to the popular anime influenced yaoi, bara and slash fiction games, the game was made using the free game engine Ren'Py. Obscura did all of the character art, writing, and some of the programming, while Doubleleaf did the scene art, Badriel did the backgrounds, and Saguaro did the programming. The character of Brad took a while to create due to frequent rewrites. She relied on the community response to improve the game; in one instance she had previously removed a heavy-handed coming out scenario with the protagonist's parents, but after a community member noted the issue was never addressed, she decided to add it back but with a lighter more comedic tone.

When the game was first beta released in 2013, it was not made available on Steam, increasing its obscurity. The game was approved on Greenlight in mid-2017, and released on Steam later that year.

Obscura received positive emails and comments from gay males, who were thankful that a dating sim featuring gay relationships had finally been released. Of the game, she described Coming Out On Top as "neither a hardcore sex game nor a game with any overt social or political agenda. It's a story-based relationship game that's supposed to be fun and entertaining".

== Reception ==
Gaming Revolution reviewers thought the game was cute, humorous and entertaining, and a great explanation to a heterosexual man of what it's like to be a gay person. Rock, Paper, Shotgun deemed it as having one of the best written romcom scripts of any video game. Paste Magazine thought the game was a wasted opportunity to example stories and representations across the LGBITQ+ spectrum, rather than reinforcing already existing ones. NZ Gamer gave it a rating of 7.8/10.

The ability to have a human-fish sexual relationship has been positively pointed out by many critics.

Obscura revealed that initial criticism from the gay community came from their scepticism that a heterosexual woman could understand the gay male experience but that this criticism disappeared once gamers started playing the demo. The second major criticism focused on not catering to enough body types. Obscura admitted that there was an over-representation of the body type she found attractive and that it was more important to ensure there were fully fleshed-out Asian and African-American storylines.
