= Café 0: The Drowned Mermaid =

2011 mystery video game

Café 0 ~The Drowned Mermaid~
- Developer: ROSEVERTE
- Publisher: ROSEVERTE
- Engine: Ren'Py
- Platforms: Android, iOS, Linux, Mac OS X, Windows
- Release: October 4, 2011
- Genre: Visual novel
- Mode: Single player

Café 0: The Drowned Mermaid (カフェ・ゼロ～溺れた人魚～, Kafe zero ~ oboreta ningyo ~) is a mystery visual novel video game developed and released by ROSEVERTE for Windows and Mac OS on October 4, 2011. Originally released in English, the game was later officially translated into Japanese and German. On April 22, 2012 the game was released on Desura and a version for Android followed on March 8, 2013. The Japanese and the English version were released for iOS on September 27, 2012.

== Gameplay ==
As it is a visual novel, the player reads through the story and makes choices at crucial points to change the outcome, leading to one of six different endings. The game is divided into three main paths; the protagonist changes her appearance based on the player's choices.

== Plot ==
The protagonist, who has lost all her memory, finds herself in a strange place called Café 0, where a blue-haired waiter serves her a glass of water. She now relives the last seven days of her life and has the chance to unveil the truth and find the cause of her death. She soon discovers that three people might be connected to her death; Ami, who claims to be her best friend, Shou, the school's doctor, and Tooru, who seems to be her ex-boyfriend. The plot takes different directions based on the player's decisions.

== Development ==
The game was created with Ren'Py. The story and the graphics were created by Chu3, Mirage from Zeiva Inc helped with co-writing, and proofreading was done by Mink and Roxie. A professional team of Japanese voice actors recorded voices for the game, including Cancer Murakani (Sui), Yuya Kakitsubata (Shou Takizawa), Mato Sarashina (Tooru Mizutani), Nanase Watarai (Ami Kawase), Nao Utsunomiya, Sayuri Misaki, and Sudachi Harumi.

== Reception ==
Café 0: The Drowned Mermaid received positive reception on TechnologyTell, where the reviewer gave 93 out of 100 possible points and praised the game's "unique gameplay experience". The game received three out of five stars on Gamezebo, with the reviewer writing: "It's certainly not the most dynamic piece of literature ever written [...] but if you're into interactive novels and you're curious to find out how a mermaid can actually drown, you'll almost certainly want to play long enough to see the game's true ending."

== Sequel ==
A sequel, Café 0: The Sleeping Beast, was released on October 29, 2016. It features new characters in a different setting, a theme song, and a longer play time than the first game.
