= Katawa Shoujo =

2012 visual novel by Four Leaf Studios

- Developer: Four Leaf Studios
- Publisher: Four Leaf Studios
- Directors: delta Raide yujovi
- Producers: Cam "cpl_crud" O'Neill; Suriko
- Programmer: delta
- Artists: gebyy-terar Kamifish moekki Rose "pimmy" Cote raemz Raide
- Writers: Anonymous22 (Shizune); Aura (Rin); Cam "cpl_crud" O'Neill (Hanako); Suriko (Lilly); TheHivemind (Emi)
- Composers: Sebastien "NicolArmarfi" Skaf; Andy "Blue123" Andi
- Engine: Ren'Py
- Platforms: Windows, Mac OS X, Linux
- Release: January 4, 2012 (English); July 8, 2013 (French); December 9, 2013 (Russian); July 27, 2014 (Spanish); April 1, 2015 (Japanese); December 14, 2015 (Italian); August 15, 2024 (Steam)
- Genres: Visual novel, nakige
- Mode: Single-player

Katawa Shoujo (Japanese: かたわ少女, Hepburn: Katawa Shōjo; lit. "Cripple Girls", translated "Disability Girls") is a bishōjo-style visual novel by Four Leaf Studios that tells the story of a young man and five young women living with varying disabilities. The game uses a traditional text and sprite-based visual novel model with an ADV-style text box running on the Ren'Py visual novel engine. The game is licensed under the Creative Commons CC-BY-NC-ND.

The majority of the story takes place at Yamaku High School, a boarding school for disabled students, located in an unnamed city somewhere in modern, northern Japan. The player takes the role of Hisao Nakai, an ordinary boy whose life changes dramatically after a heart attack caused by his long-dormant cardiac arrhythmia. After a lengthy hospitalization, he is forced to transfer to a school specialized in providing education and healthcare for students with disabilities. Over the course of the narrative, Hisao has the opportunity to come to grips with his condition and adjust to his new life.

The gameplay of Katawa Shoujo is choice-based, in which the player reads through text and occasionally has the chance to respond to prompts with a variety of preset responses. The decisions made initiate possible events or dialogue within the story. Depending on the choices made by the player, the story branches into multiple forks. Each of these paths chronicle Hisao's deepening and eventually romantic relationship (or lack thereof) with one of the five main female characters; these may variously end well, poorly, or neutrally.

== Development ==
The concept originated in a sketch created in December 2000 by Japanese doujinshi artist Raita Honjou (credited in Thanks as RAITA). From January 2007, the sketch was discussed extensively on the 4chan image board, and a multinational development group was assembled from users of 4chan and other internet communities. The group took the name Four Leaf Studios (based on 4chan's four-leaf clover logo).

Most of the art, sound, and animation assets used in the game are original and were created for the game by a dedicated team of artists on the development forums. Background images used in the game were collected through an open call for background photos, from public-domain image collections, and by a dedicated photographer on the development team. These images were later filtered to match the art style of the rest of the game's drawings. Because real pictures were used, many of the locations in the game are based on real places, with Yamaku High School being constructed from images of Brown University. The city that the novel is set in, although unnamed, is based on Sendai and the school was written to be where Aoba Castle stands.

== Release and distribution ==
On April 29, 2009, the team released an "Act One" preview. Act 1 has since been updated for several additional languages; as of Act 1's fifth version, English, French, Italian, Japanese, Russian, German, Hungarian, and both Traditional and Simplified Chinese are included. The complete English-language novel was released on January 4, 2012.

It was announced that the French-language translation would be released July 4, 2013 as both a download and a limited-edition physical edition. The French-language version was made available for download on July 8, 2013. A separate, full-patch adding a completed Russian translation was released independently by its translation group on December 9, 2013. On July 27, 2014, the International Spanish version was released and made available for download that same day. On April 1, 2015, in lieu of their traditional April Fools' Day prank, Four Leaf Studios released the Japanese translation. Additionally, they announced that a second physical release would be sold by the Japanese translation team at Comitia 112 and Comiket 88 (May 5 and August 16, 2015, respectively, at Tokyo Big Sight). The full visual novel has been released officially in English, French, Spanish, Japanese and Italian.

On June 6, 2015, Four Leaf Studios announced the end of support and development for the visual novel and official translation projects, concluding with a final bug/typo patch. They released the English script files in full and instructions on how to patch in and distribute any future fan translations into languages not included in the final official version.

Following the release of the full game, Four Leaf Studios announced that it had no plans for its members to collaborate on any new projects. However, in their celebratory 1st anniversary blog post, Aura had stated that there might be future projects for 4LS announced in 2013, though no major projects were announced. Four Leaf Studios continued supporting fan works officially, hosting selected artists at their Comiket booth while selling new content such as original artbooks and light novels based on the game, with the last attendance taking place in 2017. In 2020, Raide, the artist and co-director of the game, died suddenly, as announced by his family via his Twitter page.

Downloads for the complete novel and Act 1 alone are available for Windows, Mac OSX, and x86 Linux, available both as direct downloads from the official Katawa Shoujo website and over Bittorrent. The soundtrack is also available as a direct download.

The game received a Steam and itch.io release on August 15, 2024.

== Characters ==
=== Main characters ===
A scene from the early part of the game showing (left to right) Lilly, Misha, and Shizune

Hisao Nakai (中井 久夫, Nakai Hisao)
Hisao is a brown-haired male high school student diagnosed with chronic cardiac arrhythmia and congenital heart muscle deficiency. In the prologue, he collapses from a major heart attack after a female student asks him out. Due to his heart condition, he transfers to Yamaku High School in class 3-3, and although initially resentful of his placement in a school for those with disabilities, he eventually adapts to his new lifestyle. Through his new relationships and interactions, he begins to reconsider his preconceptions towards disabilities, including his own. His main hobbies include reading and chess, though he is noted to have been an avid soccer player before his heart attack.

Emi Ibarazaki (茨崎 笑美, Ibarazaki Emi)
Emi is an energetic, extroverted strawberry blonde girl with twintails and forest-green eyes. She has prosthetic legs, having lost her original legs below the knees as a result of a car accident eight years prior to the story. Despite her disability, she still has more than enough lower body strength to walk, and is a successful track runner. She values good diet and exercise, and is on friendly terms with the head nurse of Yamaku; she promises to keep tabs on Hisao's exercise in exchange for having him as a running partner in the mornings. She meets Hisao by running into him in the hallway, and endangers his heart on more than one occasion. Hisao feels guilty whenever she pouts, equating her expression to that of a sad puppy. Emi is Rin's best friend and hallmate due to both having extremely passionate vocations and complementary disabilities. Despite her extroverted personality, she is very secretive, has no true close friends, and has trouble getting emotionally close to people, which initially frustrates Hisao in her route. This is revealed to be in fear of losing people important to her as a result of her father's death, who was a track star himself, in the same car accident that took her legs. In her route, Hisao gives her the self-confidence to open up about her true emotions, and the two work to better each other's lives.

Hanako Ikezawa (池沢 華子, Ikezawa Hanako)
Hanako as a child suffered an accident in which her house burned down, taking the lives of her parents. The right side of her body is heavily scarred from the incident, which has left her traumatized and open to panic attacks. Her long, dark purple hair hangs down her back, and her bangs cover the right side of her face, hiding most of her scars. She spent most of her childhood in an orphanage and was bullied during her time in elementary and middle school, and as such she was offered to go to Yamaku. Initially, she is incredibly shy towards anyone except Lilly and Akira. She is another one of Hisao's classmates, but frequently either does not show up or arrives late and leaves early to avoid talking to people, preferring to spend time reading in the library where she can be alone. Through spending time with Hisao, Hanako slowly learns to open up to people and the two become heavily reliant on each other, working together to progress through life rather than mope through it.

Lilly Satou (砂藤 リリー, Satō Rirī)
Lilly is the class representative of 3-2, a class composed of students who are blind or partially blind (including Kenji); she has been blind since birth. The tallest member of the main female cast, she has long blonde hair and blue eyes. Her father is Japanese and her mother is Scottish with family in Inverness. She is very polite and ladylike with a motherly demeanor, not wanting to intrude on others' private life (including Hisao's reasons for being at Yamaku). It is also noted that she had previously attended a strict all-girls school. In contrast to Misha's fast-paced attitude to Hisao's transfer, Lilly takes things at her own relaxed pace, helping Hisao to adjust to school life in the midst of a busy festival. She is Hanako's closest and initially only friend; she regularly has lunch and tea with her, and accompanies her grocery shopping. She is also on a friendly basis with Yuuko. Shizune and Lilly have been seen to not get along, perhaps due to the fact that direct communication between her and Shizune is not feasible (she cannot see Shizune's sign language and Shizune cannot hear her or speak to her).

Different dialogue choices lead to new branching paths and endings. Characters shown (from left to right): Misha, Shizune, and Hanako.

Rin Tezuka (手塚 琳, Tezuka Rin)
Rin, a girl whose arms were almost entirely deformed due to a birth defect, uses her feet to accomplish everyday tasks with surprising dexterity. She has short red hair and dark green eyes, and wears a boy's uniform to avoid the awkward situations that would arise from using her feet while wearing a skirt. Rin has a stoic and wistful unique personality that has brought about awkward situations with her peers, especially for Hisao. As a result, some people do not talk with her, such as Lilly. She is nonchalant with the other students and their disabilities, as she often inquires about other people's disabilities as a hobby. As a result, she is seen as extremely blunt. She is Emi's best friend and hallmate, despite their polarizing personalities. Her role in the school festival is being the sole painter of a giant mural posted in front of the dorms. Rin feels that she can only express her emotions through her artwork and feels misunderstood by everyone around her. Her name was designed as both a homage to legendary cartoonist Osamu Tezuka as well as a pun based on her talent as an artist and disability (the first kanji in her surname means "hand").

Shizune Hakamichi (羽加道 静音, Hakamichi Shizune)
Shizune is one of Hisao's classmates who serves as the student council president and class representative of class 3-3. She has short dark blue hair and eyes, and wears glasses. She is both deaf and mute, communicating primarily through Japanese Sign Language. Her friend, Misha, is almost always at her side, translating everything from and to Shizune, allowing for communication with other people. As others have described her including herself, Shizune is strong-willed, forceful, and manipulative; but occasionally displays a softer side, revealing her deeper emotions. She tends to see everything around her as a competition, and frequently challenges people to games in the hopes of boosting their confidence, only for them to be intimidated by her ferocity. Shizune has an intense intolerance of Lilly for what she perceives as her overly kind and flippant behavior (namely when Lilly was on the student council in the past), and indirectly dislikes Hanako as a result. Because of her confrontational attitude, Misha appears to be Shizune's only friend, and it has kept several other students from wanting to join the student council out of fear of confronting her. This is shown to stem from her hostile household, where she is emotionally abused by her father Jigoro and distant from her younger brother Hideaki, neither of whom learned sign language and thus barely have a relationship with Shizune. In her route, Shizune eventually realizes the error of pushing people too hard after she nearly loses her friendship with Misha. Her name was designed by the game's developers to be a pun based on her disability; the kanji for her given name mean "silent" and "sound".

=== Supporting characters ===
Shiina Mikado (御門 椎名, Mikado Shiina)
Nicknamed Misha (ミーシャ, Mīsha), she is Shizune's best friend and only fellow member in the student council. She serves as her interpreter, and is the first to befriend Hisao in Yamaku. She has long curls of dyed pink hair and gold eyes. Misha attends Yamaku as part of a sign language recruitment program, making her one of the few non-disabled students attending the school. In direct contrast with Shizune, Misha is friendly and cheerful, though her enthusiastic tone for most things have sometimes tired those around her and makes her oblivious to negative emotions from other characters (including Shizune), such as sarcasm and antagonism. Despite being a relatively major character in Act 1, she does not have a romantic route due to not appearing in the original concept sketch by RAITA, but instead, she and Shizune help Hisao get used to the school in his first few days of his transfer. She does, however, have the ability to be romanced in the Shizune route as Hisao can engage in an affair with Misha, leading to a bad ending. During both paths of Shizune's route, it is revealed that Misha has an unrequited crush on Shizune; Shizune's inevitable rejection, as well as her contradictory insistence on keeping Misha around as a friend and communication outlet led Misha to develop depression and suicidal tendencies.

Kenji Setou (瀬藤 健二, Setō Kenji)
Kenji is Hisao's neighbor in the dorms and Lilly's classmate who is legally blind, being unable to see anything more than a few inches from his face. He can be described as a hikikomori and is very anti-social, claiming to be the "last sane man in an insane world." He often rants about feminist conspiracy theories, claiming that feminists are evil and want to rule the world (these feelings are revealed to stem from his feeling tired after having intercourse with his ex-girlfriend a year before the story starts), among other pointless subjects, possibly rivaling Rin's "uniqueness" in that aspect. Hisao is often annoyed by Kenji's ramblings and frequent requests for money, but often talks with him out of sheer boredom, even befriending him in Shizune's route. Kenji's route is the bad ending of Act 1 if the player does not choose one girl to befriend over the course of Act 1, ending with Hisao falling off of the school roof to his death.

Akio Mutou (武藤 昭夫, Mutō Akio)
Mutou is the science and homeroom teacher of Hisao, Misha, Shizune, and Hanako. He comes off as aloof and aimless in his lectures, but does take his teaching seriously and tries to have a familial relationship with his students. Several routes have Mutou attempt to take Hisao under his wing and push him towards science as a career, though he only succeeds in Emi's route and, to a lesser extent, Lilly's route. Conversely, he tends to have a more tense relationship with Misha due to her poor grades and lack of seriousness towards her studies (he is shown giving her remedial lessons in Shizune's good route).

Yuuko Shirakawa (白川 優子, Shirakawa Yūko)
Yuuko is the school librarian who also works part-time as a waitress at a local cafe, the Shanghai. All of the girls are on friendly terms with her either through the library or the cafe, and subsequently Hisao is as well. Yuuko is incredibly timid and constantly worries she is doing a bad job at work, though Hisao often reassures her. Despite this, she's also expressed a desire to quit one of her jobs to get a break. In addition to her jobs, Yuuko also studies anthropology at a nearby university, and occasionally dispenses worthwhile advice to Hisao. A running gag throughout the routes is that Yuuko has recently gotten out of a serious relationship with a younger, unnamed boyfriend who she then never heard from again. Although not revealed, this boyfriend is heavily implied to be Kenji (who frequently steals books from the library), and is stated as such in the beta test version of the game.

Akira Satou (砂藤晃, Satō Akira)
Akira is a local lawyer and Lilly's older sister. In direct contrast to Lilly and her own job description, Akira is easygoing, tomboyish to the point of looking androgynous, and irresponsible. Also unlike Lilly, Akira is on good terms with her cousins Shizune and Hideaki, as well as being one of Hanako's only friends. Because their parents moved to Scotland, Akira has largely raised Lilly by herself for the past six years, causing her to resent her parents. Though appearing responsible and mature due to her formal attire, Akira supplies Hisao, Lilly, and Hanako with wine for a private birthday party in Hanako's route.

Hideaki Hakamichi (羽加道 秀明, Hakamichi Hideaki)
Hideaki is the younger brother of Shizune, as well as Lilly's and Akira's cousin. Like Akira, he has an androgynous appearance, frequently confusing Hisao. Hideaki is somewhat of a loner, not being particularly close to any of his relatives (with the exception of Akira) and frequently acts standoffish towards Hisao, though this softens over time in Shizune's route and he eventually decides to learn sign language from Hisao.

Nurse (ナース, Nāsu)
The unnamed head nurse at Yamaku. His job is to care for all students in need of direct medical attention, and thus regulates Hisao's medication and persuades him to get regular exercise. Although he has a relationship with all of the Yamaku students, the only girl whose relationship with him is directly explored is Emi, whom he helped re-learn how to walk following the loss of her legs, and whom she frequently checks in with due to her prosthetics occasionally creating friction on her legs when she runs.

Miki Miura (三浦 美貴, Miura Miki)
Miki is a girl who has lost her left hand. She is another student in Mutou's class, and is also a member of the track team, with Lilly stating that she is the second fastest member after Emi. Despite these connections, Hisao only ever directly interacts with Miki in Hanako's route, where they briefly discuss his feelings for Hanako. Miki is often seen wearing unconventional clothing, wearing a boys' shirt for sheer comfort and also wearing black pants instead of red shorts during track meets. While she is not a romanceable option, a non-canon script written by Suriko (the author of Lilly's route) features her as the protagonist, with her being able to romance either Hisao or a girl named Suzu.

Iwanako (岩魚子, Iwanako)
Iwanako was Hisao's mutual love interest at his old school. Her confession to him, coupled with the winter climate, inadvertently triggered his first heart attack. During the prologue, Iwanako frequently visits Hisao, but his cold demeanor while struggling to cope with his situation drives them apart and she stops visiting after a few weeks, with Hisao never responding to her confession. In one of the only events consistent across all five routes, Iwanako later sends Hisao a letter describing her situation and hoping he is doing well. She says in the letter that it may be better if they stopped talking, but is open to a continual friendship. Hisao (and potentially other characters) react differently depending on the route, though the impact is only significant in Lilly's route.

== Plot ==
=== Act 1 ===
After being confessed to by his classmate, Hisao suffers a heart attack. Though Hisao survives, he is soon diagnosed with arrhythmia and is transferred to Yamaku High School, a boarding school for disabled high school students, in order to help monitor his condition.

Hisao arrives at the school a week prior to the school festival. There he meets five girls that he begins to take an interest in: Shizune Hakamichi, the deaf student council president; Lilly Satou, a blind girl and Shizune's estranged paternal cousin; Hanako Ikezawa, a girl with massive burns on the right side of her body; Emi Ibarazaki, the school's track-and-field star with prosthetic legs; and Rin Tezuka, an art club member with no arms.

Depending on the choices the player makes, Hisao spends time at the festival with one of the five girls, leading into their route. Alternatively, if the player fails to begin any route, Hisao spends the festival drinking whiskey on the rooftop with Kenji Setou, his near-sighted hall mate, and proceeds to fall off the roof to his death.

=== Emi's Route ===
Hisao becomes Emi's running partner on the school track in order to help manage his health. Hisao becomes fast friends with her and Rin, and the three frequently eat lunch together on the roof of the school. After Emi comes down with a cold from running in the rain, Hisao tends to her. The next day, Emi confesses her feelings for Hisao and they kiss.

Though their relationship begins smoothly, Emi's legs receive rashes that become infected after excessive running, forcing her to use a wheelchair for several weeks. Hisao and Emi began regularly having sex, but their relationship is abruptly paused when Emi decides to take a break to focus on exams.

After Emi recovers, Hisao realizes that their relationship is only physically intimate rather than emotionally so, and becomes frustrated when Emi refuses to open up about her life. Hisao remains optimistic about their relationship after Emi invites him to have lunch with her and her mother. However, the lunch ends abruptly when Hisao presses further about Emi's past, and Emi demands that he leave.

In the bad ending for Emi's route, Hisao tries to apologize to her, but she breaks up with him, and they never talk again. In the good ending, Hisao not only apologizes but professes his love for Emi, asserting that he wants to help her like she helped him. Emi takes Hisao to her father's grave and admits she never got over his death in the car accident that took her legs, avoiding getting close to other people. Upon returning home, Hisao and Emi have sex and decide to continue their relationship.

=== Hanako's Route ===
In this route, Hisao - who became an avid bookworm during his time in the hospital - bonds over this shared interest with Hanako, and spends the festival playing chess with her and later having tea with her and Lilly at the Shanghai. Afterwards. Hisao becomes good friends with the two girls, often eating lunch with them in a private room and occasionally holding tea parties in Lilly's room. Hanako, normally an extremely shy and evasive person, begins slowly opening up to Hisao, and Lilly and Misha ask him to keep doing so as to make Hanako open up in general. Hisao spends time with Hanako on his own accord, and eventually, Hanako reveals the truth about her past after Lilly revealed Hisao's condition to her: Hanako's family home burned down, resulting in her severe burns and the death of her parents. Soon after, a classmate and Emi's track teammate, Miki Miura, asks Hisao if he likes Hanako; the player can have Hisao either admit or deny it.

Hanako's birthday soon approaches, and Lilly and Hisao go into town to buy her presents. While doing group work, Misha and Shizune inadvertently cause Hisao to reveal this to Hanako, who suddenly begins having a panic attack. She is comforted by Shizune and Hisao, who takes her to the nurse to recuperate. Distraught at this turn of events, Hisao talks it over with Lilly, who reveals that she will be heading to her home in Scotland to visit her ill aunt for a time. They decide to have a small party for both Lilly and Hanako prior to the former leaving, joined by Lilly's older sister Akira. The four drink wine supplied by Akira, and in her inebriated state, Hanako seemingly makes a move on Hisao. Later, Lilly and Akira take Hisao and Hanako to a jazz club, where the latter two play billiards together; Hisao and Hanako bond over their past trauma while playing, and assure each other that they are there for each other.

After Lilly leaves, the player can choose to either call it a day or go into town with Hanako. Due to her absence and her upcoming birthday (which coincides with the anniversary of the fire), Hanako shuts herself in her room for several days. Hisao becomes worried about this and decides to visit Hanako, who acts even more distant than usual. On the day of her birthday, Hisao calls Lilly up for advice, and she tells him to treat Hanako like a friend rather than try to protect her. The bad ending results if the player chose to call it a day when Lilly left, regardless of how Hisao responds to Lilly's advice: he visits her room again and tries to do something with her. Hanako suddenly becomes violently angry, snapping at Hisao for coddling her and declaring that she hates him, Lilly, and everyone else. Shaken and upset, Hisao returns to his room. Alternatively, if the player chose to go into town, two different endings occur while Hisao talks with Lilly. The neutral ending occurs when Hisao ignores Lilly's advice; upon going to Hanako's room, the two play a chess game, reaffirming their friendship.

The good ending occurs when Hisao takes Lilly's advice, ultimately not visiting Hanako in her room, instead devoting his time to studying for exams. After a few days, Hisao does eventually go to her room, where he reveals to her the post-operative scar he received when the surgeons had to operate on his heart. Following this and an excursion into town, Hisao has a long talk with her where they describe each other's lives prior to coming to Yamaku. Hanako then takes Hisao to her dorm, where she undresses to show the full extent of her scars to return Hisao's earlier gesture. Caught up in each other, the two have sex and sleep together. Despite this, they began acting awkward around each other due to having taken such a big step above friendship without properly establishing themselves as a couple first. Hisao rectifies this by meeting with her in the park, where they express all of their true emotions: Hanako wishes for Hisao to treat her like an equal instead of someone in need of protection, while Hisao admits to depending on Hanako for emotional support. They then profess their love to each other, and while walking back, Hanako gives Hisao her first real kiss.

=== Lilly's Route ===
In this route, Hisao goes into town on a whim where he runs into Lilly and meets Akira. He later befriends Lilly and Hanako and takes an interest in the former; in talking with Lilly, he learns that she reluctantly moved from Akira's home to the dorms just earlier that year, and that she is half-Scottish. Later, Hisao and Lilly go shopping for Hanako's birthday. Along the way they meet Akira and Lilly's cousin Hideaki, who is also Shizune's younger brother. Hisao buys his present for Hanako later, and also buys a small music box from the same store. Later noticing she seems depressed, Hisao takes Lilly to a cafe; as they both realize the outing has become a date, Hisao asks Lilly out again later. At Hanako's party, the group drinks Akira's wine and Hisao ends up sleeping over to avoid curfew. Tending to Lilly's hangover the next morning, Hisao learns from her that she needs to head to Scotland to visit her sick aunt, but also that she has not seen her parents in six years due to her parents getting work in Inverness, Scotland, leaving Akira to raise Lilly in Japan for work and education respectively. Lilly is thus unsure how to act around her own parents. To cheer her up, Hisao gifts her the music box, and she kisses his cheek as a thank you.

Later, Hisao has lunch on the roof with Hanako, Lilly, Emi, and Rin, during which he seems to suffer a heart flutter. After recovering, Lilly gives him a paper crane as a parting gift, and she leaves the next day. Hisao spends the next couple of weeks studying and tending to Hanako. After a call with Lilly, he realizes he is in love with her. Lilly eventually returns, and to celebrate a long weekend, she invites Hisao and Hanako to spend some time in a guest house in Hokkaido. The day after arriving there, the trio try to walk into town, when Hisao suddenly experiences another heart flutter that knocks him unconscious. Waking up later that evening, he finds Lilly out in a field. Lilly admits that her concern for Hisao stems from a fear of abandonment like with her parents. The two break down and profess their love for each other, before going inside and repeatedly making love to each other before returning home the next evening.

Hisao and Lilly spend their time in bliss as exams pass while Hanako joins the newspaper club and becomes more socially active, but this idyllic living is interrupted when Akira reveals she will be moving to Scotland to work at her father's company. The next day, Hisao and Lilly go for their first formal date at a high-end restaurant, where they discuss their past schooling and romantic situations. During this time, the player can bring up Iwanako's situation; refusing to do so automatically results in the neutral ending. Later, while having sex again, Hisao's heart flutters again, which starts to become a regular occurrence seemingly ignited by alcohol he has frequently drunk with Lilly prior. The next day, Akira privately meets with Hisao, and reveals that in addition to her taking the new job, her parents (whom Akira resents for not prioritizing their children) have invited Lilly to move to Scotland with them permanently. Lilly later informs Hisao that she accepted, effectively resulting in their breakup.

A week later, Lilly moves out of Yamaku, making amends with Shizune and giving a tearful goodbye to Hanako as she does; the neutral ending occurs here should the choices made throughout the route reflect as such. Alternatively, the good ending occurs if Hisao told Lilly about Iwanako and other choices: Hisao becomes determined to talk to Lilly one final time, taking a taxi first to Shizune's home and then, after being directed by Hideaki, to the airport. He rushes over there, but overexerts himself and suffers another heart attack. Hisao survives, and wakes up in the hospital two days later. Lilly learns of what happened and rushes back to Japan to visit Hisao. While they are reunited, Hisao apologizes to Lilly for relying on her without considering her feelings, and pleads with her to stay in Japan with him forever; she accepts. In a post-credits scene, Hisao, Lilly, and Akira take a walk to celebrate Hisao being discharged from the hospital, with Hisao and Lilly planning to go through college together before starting their careers as teachers. Akira bids them farewell before leaving to go back to Scotland, while Hisao and Lilly head back to Yamaku determined to move forward together.

=== Rin's Route ===
In this route, Hisao helps Rin and Emi paint a mural for the festival and expresses interest in joining the art club to its supervising teacher, Shinichi Nomiya. After spending the festival with Rin supervising the mural and later properly joining the art club, Hisao becomes tentative friends with Rin and Emi. Rin frequently describes Hisao as “gloomy” due to him rarely smiling since they've known each other. As time goes on, Nomiya tells Rin that he called in favors to have her art displayed in a gallery, but she confides in Hisao that she is not certain she is up to the task. Hisao encourages her to do it to the point of getting irritated, seemingly displeasing Rin. Afterwards, though, Hisao and Rin talk on the rooftop, where they discuss whether or not they would change themselves; when Hisao implies he would, Rin consoles him with a hug. This cheers Hisao up tremendously, and he vows to live life positively. Later, Rin catches a cold from Emi, who gives her cold medication that Rin proceeds to take too much of. Consequently, when Hisao goes to visit her, Rin deliriously kisses him, only to forget the next day. Rin takes Hisao to her happy place, a small meadow on the outskirts of town, and though Hisao reveals their kiss, the two reaffirm their friendship.

Rin agrees to have her work exhibited at the gallery of Nomiya's friend Sae Saionji, but Sae tells her she would need to create way more art for it to be acceptable. Nomiya promptly gets Rin exempted from classes so Rin can make the rest of her paintings in Sae's studio all day for weeks. Hisao visits Rin frequently, but each time is incredibly awkward after he has confessed his feelings to Rin, only to be rejected. After several weeks, Rin begins suffering artist's block, and tells Hisao that she plans to destroy and rebuild herself to become the artist she feels she needs to be. Despite Hisao's attempts at distracting her, Rin eventually tells Hisao to not visit any longer. However, after learning about how Sae's husband committed suicide due to his artistic devotion, a concerned Hisao visits Rin and discovers her masturbating on the floor. He reluctantly helps her finish in an attempt to console her, and they sleep together platonically. Having Hisao attempt to confront Rin about her feelings the next day leads to the bad ending, where Hisao snaps at Rin and breaks off their friendship. Alternatively, Hisao expresses a desire to get through to Rin, but tells her he can't be there for her with the exhibition any longer.

A week later, Rin finishes her art and goes to Hisao's room, where she confesses to him, but feeling used, he rejects her. The next day, Hisao and Emi go to Rin's art exhibition, where Rin has an anxiety attack from being bombarded by interviewers. Hisao takes her outside to comfort her, where Rin says she wishes she had someone who didn't have to ask her anything. The neutral ending occurs when Hisao questions Rin why people asking about her does not make her happy: Rin seems to recuperate and returns. Later, exams finish before summer vacation, and Hisao goes to visit Rin at the studio. However, Rin refuses to talk with him, still upset about Hisao rejecting her. While they walk together in the rain, Rin eventually reveals that all she wanted was for someone to empathize with her, and that she believed Hisao was that person. Hisao coldly states that people can never truly understand others without literally becoming them. Rin then reveals that she is going to transfer to an art school, cutting off her ties with everyone at Yamaku.

The good ending occurs when Hisao asks if Rin could ever really find someone like that: Rin goes back to Yamaku to recuperate, with Hisao and Emi following suit. After Hisao finishes exams the next day, he finds Rin in her classroom. He eventually convinces her to apologize to Nomiya, only to discover that he has been emotionally abusing her to do her artwork when she has merely seen it as a hobby. Hisao comforts her and realizes she was always trying to reach out to him via her paintings. As summer break arrives, Rin comes to Hisao's dorm in the rain, where they make love. Afterwards, they go back to the meadow, where they profess their love and decide they don't need to change if they like each other as they are. Rin then asks Hisao, “What's the word for when it feels inside your heart that everything in the world is all right?”.

=== Shizune's Route ===
In this route, after frequent pestering from Shizune and Misha, Hisao decides to join the Student Council despite the three of them being the only members, and spends the festival with them watching fireworks on the rooftop. Hoping to properly connect with Shizune, Hisao begins taking a sign language elective and receiving tutoring from Misha. At the same time, Shizune, fearing Hisao has become depressed due to his condition, repeatedly holds menial contests with him in the hopes of lifting his spirits. The Student Council primarily spends its time preparing for the annual Tanabata festival. On the night of the festival, Hisao and Shizune end up alone together. Walking the school grounds late at night, Hisao confesses to Shizune, and she accepts.

Despite their new relationship, Hisao finds himself unable to progress it due to their Student Council work. He eventually gets the chance when Shizune invites him and Misha to spend a week in the summer with her family. There, Hisao meets Shizune's father Jigoro, as well as Hideaki and Akira, with Lilly also present. He is mortified to learn that none of them learned sign language for Shizune, as well as by Jigoro's domineering, emotionally abusive personality. Although Shizune consummates her relationship with Hisao on the trip, they become increasingly distant as Shizune dives into focusing on the next term's student council elections. Misha, who cut her hair during the trip, also begins acting increasingly distant and lethargic, especially after she and Shizune have an offscreen fight.

Late one night, Misha enters Hisao's room and tries to talk with him about Shizune, then proceeds to try and kiss him. The player can choose in this moment whether or not Hisao has sex with Misha. Regardless, Hisao confronts Misha the next day, and learns from her that she has had a longstanding crush on Shizune. She eventually confessed, but despite turning her down, Shizune kept Misha around as a friend, making Misha feel used especially as Hisao began to date Shizune; she then begins expressing suicidal thoughts. Hisao resolves to repair the trio's relationship, but Misha continues to avoid him and Shizune for several weeks, so an oblivious Shizune begins trying to cheer her up.

The good and bad ending depend on whether or not Hisao refused or accepted sex with Misha respectively. If Hisao slept with her, Misha continues to avoid the two, and Shizune remains inconsiderate of Misha's feelings. Eventually, realizing the problems she has in trying to suppress everyone, Shizune cuts all her ties, including breaking up with Hisao. If Hisao did not sleep with her, Misha eventually comes around, mending their friendship. Shizune, acknowledging her controlling nature, decides to change her ways and live for helping others by becoming a philanthropist; taking this to heart, Hisao decides to become a teacher at Yamaku and Misha a sign-language instructor overseas. The route ends with the trio delegating tasks to the new student council, before graduating together and promising to all reconnect in the future.

== Critical reception ==
Katawa Shoujo received generally favorable critical reception. Upon release, it was praised by some reviewers and fans, who most notably praised the game's sincere and respectful treatment of the setting. The game's sensitive handling of its eroge elements, instances of soft core erotic imagery on the relevant forks which were integral to its narratives, was also praised (it was also noted that as "adult content" is removed the game can be played with these scenes replaced, without the cost of losing much characterization and plot development). Other critics were less warm, with Dave Riley of Otaku USA Magazine claiming the game had "bad prose and bad characters."

Following Katawa Shoujo's release, Raita, the artist who created the original image that the game was based upon, wrote a post in English on his Japanese-language blog, thanking the developers for creating the game. Raita mentioned that he had been "closely watch[ing] over" the production of the game and that he was "deeply affected" by the thought of the challenges that the development team had to overcome.

== Soundtrack ==
Katawa Shoujo Enigmatic Box of Sound

Soundtrack album by NicolArmarfi, Blue123, & Special Guests
- Released: January 20, 2012
- Genre: Video game soundtrack
- Length: 1:35:29
- Label: Independent

The game's soundtrack, entitled Katawa Shoujo Enigmatic Box of Sound, was released for download on January 20, 2012. It was written primarily by musicians Sebastien "NicolArmarfi" Skaf and Andy "Blue123" Andi. An updated version of "Red Velvet" was released alongside the French language update on July 8, 2013, featuring saxophone player Japes. Two previously unreleased bonus tracks, "When It's Hard to Smile" and "Carefree Days", were released separately on February 10, 2010, and December 24, 2014, respectively. On December 6, 2024, selections from the soundtrack were released on major streaming services under the Materia Collective label.

All music is composed by NicolArmarfi, Blue123, & Special Guests.

Part 1
No.	Title	Music	Length
1.	"Lullaby of Open Eyes"	NicolArmarfi, Cpl_Crud	3:09
2.	"Cold Iron"	NicolArmarfi	3:02
3.	"Damage"	Blue123, delta	1:15
4.	"Caged Heart"	Blue123	1:21
5.	"Fripperies"	Blue123	1:28
6.	"School Days"	NicolArmarfi	2:48
7.	"The Student Council"	NicolArmarfi	1:59
8.	"Ease"	NicolArmarfi	2:38
9.	"Daylight"	NicolArmarfi	1:57
10.	"Ah Eh I Oh You"	Blue123, OverCoat	2:06
11.	"Stride"	NicolArmarfi	2:14
12.	"Out of the Loop"	NicolArmarfi	2:24
13.	"Nocturne"	NicolArmarfi	3:50
14.	"Raindrops and Puddles"	NicolArmarfi	2:35
15.	"Generic Happy Music"	NicolArmarfi	1:17
16.	"Hokabi"	NicolArmarfi	2:21
17.	"Concord"	NicolArmarfi, Blue123	3:05
18.	"Everyday Fantasy"	Blue123	1:52
19.	"High Tension"	NicolArmarfi	0:53
20.	"Standing Tall"	NicolArmarfi	3:11
21.	"Passing of Time"	NicolArmarfi, Cpl_Crud	0:48
22.	"Romance in Andante"	NicolArmarfi	1:04
Total length:			47:26

Part 2
No.	Title	Music	Length
1.	"Wiosna"	NicolArmarfi	1:09
2.	"Parity"	NicolArmarfi	2:24
3.	"Afternoon"	NicolArmarfi	3:08
4.	"Air Guitar"	NicolArmarfi	1:13
5.	"Painful History"	NicolArmarfi	2:40
6.	"Aria de l'Etoile"	NicolArmarfi	1:23
7.	"To Become One"	NicolArmarfi	4:08
8.	"Cloudland Swing"	NicolArmarfi	0:59
9.	"Three Stars"	NicolArmarfi	0:55
10.	"Teatime, Fast Forward"	NicolArmarfi	0:55
11.	"2x400m Relay"	NicolArmarfi	1:02
12.	"Jitter"	NicolArmarfi	1:02
13.	"Innocence"	NicolArmarfi	2:59
14.	"Red Velvet"	NicolArmarfi, Japes	3:28
15.	"Sarabande from BWV1010, Musicbox"	Blue123, Johann Sebastian Bach	1:22
16.	"Moment of Decision"	NicolArmarfi	4:03
17.	"Breathlessly"	Blue123	1:53
18.	"Comfort"	NicolArmarfi	2:38
19.	"Friendship"	NicolArmarfi	1:16
20.	"Shadow of the Truth"	NicolArmarfi	2:10
21.	"Letting My Heart Speak"	NicolArmarfi	2:36
22.	"Romance in Andante II"	NicolArmarfi	2:56
Total length:			46:29

Part 3
No.	Title	Music	Length
1.	"Spin"	Juno, Delta	0:39
2.	"Focus"	Juno	0:55
Total length:			1:34

== See also ==
- Doki Doki Literature Club!
- Class of '09
- MiSide
- Needy Streamer Overload
- You and Me and Her: A Love Story
