= Black Closet =

2015 video game

- Developer: Hanako Games
- Publisher: Hanako Games
- Engine: Ren'Py
- Platform: macOS; Microsoft Windows
- Release: September 16, 2015
- Genres: Visual novel, Strategy RPG, Life simulation
- Mode: Single-player

Black Closet is a mystery visual novel, strategy RPG and life simulation game developed and published by Hanako Games and released on September 16, 2015 for Windows, Mac OS X and Linux on the digital distribution service Steam.

The game was received positively by critics, and was a finalist for the Excellence in Narrative award at the 2016 IGF.

== Gameplay ==
Black Closet combines traits of a visual novel and a strategy RPG. Players play the role of Elsa, a student in a prestigious school for girls named St. Claudine's. She must solve procedurally-generated mysteries in order to increase her leadership abilities, using a group of fellow student assistants. However, one of these students is a traitor, and Elsa must find their identity.

== Plot ==
The main character, Elsa, is sent to an elite all-girls school, where she becomes the student council president. Her job is to track down students who are committing misdemeanors and scandals to maintain the school's integrity.

The game also has yuri elements to its story, letting players romance five potential women.

== Development ==
The game was developed by Hanako Games founder Georgina Bensley, who was a full-time independent game developer for 10 years prior to the game's release. It was created in a customized fork of the Ren'Py engine. The game was initially prototyped on paper to determine the gameplay concept's feasibility.

The game took roughly three years to develop. The concept for the game was inspired by the espionage work in Floor 13 as well as the developer's own experience in an Episcopalian private school, with some of the situations in the game being inspired by real-life events she had seen.

The game's RPG aspects were also inspired by western RPG series such as Baldur's Gate and Dragon Age, giving freedom to shape the character's personality as well as the story.

== Reception ==
Black Closet was well received by critics.

Katherine Cross of Rock, Paper, Shotgun said the game "punctures misogynist stereotypes around teen dramas" and that the characters "who at first blush appear to be tropes" later become more interesting. Graham Smith of the same publication said that the game was a "smart, well-written, choice-and-consequences game that deserves more attention".

Leigh Alexander, writing for Boing Boing, said that she "kinda [dug]" the game and called the concept "engaging" and "refreshing".

John Bridgman of Indiegames.com called the concept of the game "interesting", despite saying that it "lacks polish".

The game became an IGF finalist for Excellence in Narrative in 2016.
