= Dysfunctional Systems =

- Series title card
- Genre: Visual novel
- Developer: Dischan Media
- Publisher: Dischan Media
- Artist: Saimon Ma (for Episode 1)
- Writer: Terrence Smith
- Composer: Kristian Jensen
- Platforms: Microsoft Windows, macOS, Linux, iOS
- First release: Episode 1 April 4, 2013

Dysfunctional Systems is a visual novel created by Canadian studio Dischan Media. The story follows Winter Harrison, a "mediator"-in-training, as she attempts to resolve chaotic situations in different worlds. The first of several planned episodes, Learning to Manage Chaos, was released on April 4, 2013 In February 2014, Dischan launched a Kickstarter campaign to raise funds for another two episodes of the story. Although the campaign met and exceeded its funding goals, the project was cancelled on January 2, 2015.

The series was restarted with the release of a prequel episode, Dysfunctional Systems: Orientation on July 24, 2017.

== Gameplay ==
Gameplay from Episode 1. Here, Cyrus (right) is speaking to Winter.

Dysfunctional Systems is a visual novel series, where the player reads text to progress the story. At certain points, the novel will present the player with a choice of different dialogue or actions for the series protagonist, Winter Harrison, which will affect events and their consequences. The novel includes a "codex" feature, where the reader can find background information on the current world, such as its geography and politics, as well as topics related to the problems the world is experiencing. The novel also implements a "profile" feature. The choices made during a play-through of an episode can be saved in a profile, such that their consequences can be carried over to the next episode.

== Story ==
=== Setting and characters ===
In Dysfunctional Systems, Earth bears a utopian society with a school called "School Mediātōrum", composed of individuals called "mediators". Mediators are humans who resolve chaotic situations in other worlds. Though these worlds exist in different planes, and range in themes from "dystopian, to futuristic or fantastical", it is believed that the chaos of any one world can adversely affect Earth as well.

The protagonist of the series, Winter Harrison, is a 14-year-old mediator-in-training. A moral individual, she still finds the concept of "other worlds" hard to grasp. On her second mission (the focus of Episode 1) she is paired with Cyrus Addington, a tough and infamous senior mediator, to act as her guide and mentor.

=== Episode 1: Learning to Manage Chaos ===
Dysfunctional Systems Episode 1: Learning to Manage Chaos
- Developer: Dischan Media
- Publisher: Dischan Media
- Directors: Jeremy Miller; Terrance Smith; Saimon Ma (visual)
- Programmers: Jeremy Miller; Terrance Smith; Anton Prydatko (iOS version)
- Artists: Saimon Ma; Eric Tang; Juri Moon
- Writer: Terrence Smith
- Composer: Kristian Jensen
- Series: Dysfunctional Systems
- Engine: Ren'Py (Build 6.15.4.320, as of Version 1.0.1)
- Platform: PC/macOS/Linux/iOS
- Release: NA: April 4, 2013 (Dischan) September 26, 2013 (Steam)
- Genre: Visual novel
- Mode: Single-player

Having long become comfortable with her utopian society, Winter is surprised to learn that there are other worlds in other planes of existence. These worlds are quite different from hers, ranging from troubled, to dystopian, to futuristic or fantastical. However, they are all riddled with problems that, if not resolved, may adversely affect her home world. She is chosen to become a "mediator", charged with the maintenance of order in these chaotic planes, and so enters a vocational school for training. Episode 1 details her second shadowing of a seasoned mediator, only a few weeks into her first year. She and her mentor enter a world seemingly much like their own, except for this issue of "poverty" with which Winter has difficulty understanding...

— from the official website

In the first episode, Winter and Cyrus travel to Sule, a sporadically-progressing industrial planet. They arrive in Brighton, a poor and minor country on Sule. There, the two find that the President of Brighton is attempting to negotiate his society's freedom from its oppressor, the wealthy state of Gabrea. The key object of his threat is an untested nuclear bomb, waiting to be launched at Gabrea via intercontinental ballistic missile.

Cyrus devises a plan to contain the chaos: to assassinate the President and have him declared a martyr. Cyrus' plan horrifies Winter; at this point, the player can choose whether Winter will go along with Cyrus' plan, or to rebel against him and try to reason with the President instead. If Cyrus' plan is taken, the President is killed and his government decides to launch the weapon at Gabrea. If Winter's plan is taken, she and Cyrus manage to convince the President to change his mind and fire his weapon into a nearby sea as a warning shot instead.

However, in both cases, the detonation of the weapon goes badly wrong, igniting the atmosphere and completely destroying Sule. Winter and Cyrus are teleported back to the school on Earth just in time, where they are immediately treated for radiation poisoning that they had obtained before Sule's destruction. Winter is carried back to her room, where she recounts to her room-mate Waverly of Sule's demise. The next day, Waverly fends off well-wishers from seeing Winter, then helps her to her debriefing, ending the episode.

== Development ==
In Dischan's earlier work, Juniper's Knot, the player can unlock bonus art featuring the protagonists of the story with two other characters, Winter and Cyrus.

On January 5, 2013, Dischan leader Jeremy Miller announced the company's first series of visual novels, titled Dysfunctional Systems. On June 5, 2013, Dischan posted Episode 1 of Dysfunctional Systems on Steam Greenlight. On September 26, 2013, Episode 1 was released on Steam.

=== Kickstarter campaign ===
Despite reporting "decent sales" of Episode 1, Dischan admitted that the project was not a financial success. Dischan turned to the crowd-funding site Kickstarter to raise funds for the production of the second and third installments of the novel. The campaign was opened for funding in February 2014, with the goal of raising C$49,000. By the end of the campaign in March 2014, the campaign had successfully raised C$67,450. Because the original goal was exceeded, Dischan stated that it would add more characters and environments to the second and third episodes than they had originally intended, as well as producing a bonus visual novel depicting Winter's first week as a mediator-in-training.

The project was cancelled in a January 2, 2015 announcement by Dischan and began issuing partial refunds through Kickstarter to backers.

=== Soundtrack ===
The soundtrack to Episode 1, written and performed by Kristian "CombatPlayer" Jensen, was released on 4 April 2013. It is distributed with Episode 1 and can also be played in the jukebox within the game.

Dysfunctional Systems - Episode 1: Learning to Manage Chaos

Soundtrack album by Kristian "CombatPlayer" Jensen
- Released: April 4, 2013
- Recorded
- Genre: Video game soundtrack
- Length: 45:04
No.	Title	Length
1.	"Terminus" (Theme of Episode 1)	4:06
2.	"Turbulence"	2:12
3.	"Tempering"	2:14
4.	"Looking In"	2:46
5.	"Soft Engagement"	2:12
6.	"Whisper"	2:29
7.	"Analysis"	1:05
8.	"Ripple"	2:01
9.	"Seize the Day"	3:23
10.	"Better get Runnin'"	2:08
11.	"Cado Astrum"	3:29
12.	"Fragment"	1:55
13.	"Hygge"	2:30
14.	"Speak Loud" (Rising Superstar Irie)	4:14
15.	"Off Time"	2:27
16.	"Waverly"	2:14
17.	"Maintenance"	1:58
18.	"Maintenance" (OP version)	1:12
Total length:		45:04

== Reception ==
Dysfunctional Systems - Episode 1 received positive reviews from critics, with the primary issue raised being its brief length.

Nadia Oxford of Gamezebo scored the game 4/5 stars, commending the art, music and story, but criticizing the slow pace and lack of player interaction overall.

Andrew Barker of RPGFan scored the first episode 80/100, saying that while the art was good and the setting and characters showed promise, the game is "held back" by its short length and he recommended players to hold off on purchasing it until the entire game was released.

Kristina Pino of Japanator said that while she liked the artwork, the story "[took] a while to really get moving", and she did not feel a large amount of interest in seeing what happened after the first episode, also calling it too short.
