= Stories from Sol: The Gun-Dog =

- Developer: Space Colony Studios
- Publishers: Astrolabe Games; Meridiem Games
- Director: Jonathan Durham
- Writer: Jonathan Durham
- Composer: Daniel Goodman
- Series: Stories from Sol
- Engine: Ren'Py
- Platforms: Windows; PlayStation 4; Nintendo Switch; PlayStation 5; Linux
- Release: February 20, 2025
- Genre: Visual novel
- Mode: Single-player

Stories from Sol: The Gun-Dog is a 2025 retro visual novel developed by British indie game developer Space Colony Studios and published by Meridiem Games, PM Studios, and Astrolabe Games. It was released for the PlayStation, Windows PCs, and the Nintendo Switch in February 2025. Astrolabe Games and Meridiem Games had localized and published the game internationally. The game was heavily inspired by Japanese PC-9800 adventure games.

Players control a lieutenant in the Jovian navy, who was recently recruited as a security guard for the Gun Dog ship. Stories from Sol: The Gun-Dog had received generally positive reviews from critics upon its release.

== Gameplay ==
In Stories from Sol: The Gun-Dog, players must explore the spaceship.

Stories from Sol: The Gun-Dog is a visual novel. Like most visual novels, inputs by the players are limited to progressing dialogue. It is inspired by earlier PC-9800 titles. Players are able to navigate to various locations on the ship, or talk with the different crew members on board.

Unlike usual visual novels with multiple routes, the game features branching story paths that all lead back to one ending.

== Plot ==
In Stories from Sol: The Gun-Dog, players control the protagonist, who was expected to participate in the Solar War; a battle between Earth, Mars, and the “Jovian Alliance” situated near Jupiter. They later are recruited as a security officer for the Gun Dog spaceship.

== Reception ==
Reception

Aggregate scores
Aggregator	Score
Metacritic	PC: 80/100; NS: 84/100
OpenCritic	86% recommend (Note: Based on 22 reviews)

Review scores
Publication	Score
RPGFan	82/100
Shacknews	7/10
Checkpoint Gaming	8.5/10
Vandal	7/10

Upon release, Stories from Sol: The Gun-Dog received "generally favorable" reviews from video game publications based on the review aggregate website Metacritic aimed towards the Nintendo Switch and PC ports. Fellow review aggregator OpenCritic assessed that the game received strong approval, being recommended by 86% of critics.

Writing for RPGFan, Matt Wardell felt that the game was a "proud homage to sci-fi anime of the late ’70s and ’80s", saying that its mecha designs were reminiscent to Mobile Suit Gundam. The reviewer praised the quality, saying that the "amount of detail put into the tech aboard the Gun-Dog goes [far beyond] any of the manga and anime that inspired it". While Lindsay M. of Digitally Downloaded praised the characters, detail, and the narrative, saying it left a "great impression". Checkpoint Gaming's Edie W.K wrote that the retro PC-9800 aesthetic was "delightfully nostalgic". Shacknews' writer Lucas White felt the "moment to moment" writing was good in a prose sense, but criticized how shallow the game felt in the end. While Fran Matas, an author writing for Spanish video game website Vandal said that Stories from Sol: The Gun-Dog was similar to pioneers of the visual novel genre, but criticized its lackluster interactivity and the scarcity of information presented. Siliconera's Perez Cody wrote that game's crew was "full of memorable characters", and called the writing "witty". Josh McGrath at Gamer Escape said that while the "music and sound design felt true-to-era", the audio overall wasn't "very memorable".
