= A Date with Death =

- Developers: Two and a Half Studios
- Publishers: Two and a Half Studios
- Engine: Ren'Py
- Platforms: Linux macOS; Windows
- Release: December 7, 2023
- Genres: Dating sim, visual novel
- Mode: Single-player

A Date with Death is a 2023 freeware visual novel developed and published by Two and a Half Studios. It is built using the Ren'Py engine and is available for Linux, macOS, and Windows systems.

The game centers around the player's interactions with the Grim Reaper, featuring elements of romance and supernatural themes. Players can customize their character's appearance and engage in conversations with the Grim Reaper through instant messaging and video calls. Released on December 7, 2023, A Date with Death has garnered positive reviews, with critics praising its writing, characterization, and the depth of its narrative. The game also has paid downloadable content that expands the story and adds new endings.

A sequel to the game, A Date with Death 2: REMNANTS, was announced to release in 2026.

== Gameplay ==
The game is a visual novel and dating sim. The player can customize the main character's name, appearance, and gender. Most of the game is centered around selecting options for the protagonist's interactions with the Grim Reaper, primarily through instant messaging and video calls.

== Plot ==
The protagonist, an otherwise ordinary young adult who has had multiple near-death experiences, finds a new app on their laptop that they are unable to delete. Opening it, they are taken to a chatroom where another user calling himself the Grim Reaper (nicknamed "Grim" by the protagonist) demands their soul. He also video calls the protagonist in an attempt to prove his identity. Though skeptical of his claims, the protagonist finds Grim attractive and agrees to a wager: if he is unable to claim the protagonist's soul within a week, they will be entitled to take Grim's soul.

Over the week, the protagonist endures several more calamities, but is uninjured each time. They continue chatting with Grim who is initially reluctant to divulge personal details about himself, including his real name. On the third day, Grim is sick from an imbalance in his soul. With the intent for himself and the protagonist to understand each other better, Grim offers to temporarily channel some of his own life force into them, but warns that they will go insane if they attempt to reject him partway through the ritual. Subsequently, Grim reveals that the protagonist has an unusual aura compared to other mortals he has seen.

The next day, Grim has recovered from his illness. He admits to being responsible for the recent accidents befalling the protagonist, as he has grown frustrated with how often they have cheated death over the years (implied to have started when the protagonist survived falling from a tree as a child). He also discloses that he is incapable of lying. On the fifth day, their correspondence continues. Grim abruptly ends their call and later appears outside the protagonist's apartment window to give them a bouquet. He also breaks his vows by telling them his real name: Casper.

On the sixth day, Casper's attempts on the protagonist's life suddenly cease. Over a video call, he tells them how the day before he was again suffering from a lesser form of soul sickness, but meeting with them cured him. Through the protagonist's interactions healing him, their pet, and even their plant, they having been unknowingly giving away pieces of their soul. Casper confesses that he has developed romantic feelings for the protagonist. He also reflects on his uncertain origins and how he has never experienced aging.

On the seventh and final day, Casper theorizes that the protagonist is a rare immortal who embodies life, just as Grim Reapers embody death. If the protagonist remains distant from Casper and overtaxes their abilities, they become ill. Fearing that their soul will soon cease to exist, the protagonist forfeits the bet to Casper who promises to take them to the best afterlife. Afterwards, he mourns them alone.

In all other endings the protagonist and Casper become a couple, including variations where Casper abandons his role to marry them, or even the protagonist becoming a Grim Reaper themselves.

=== Beyond the Bet ===
Diverging after the fifth day, the protagonist wakes up the next morning with a cold. Casper visits them, and at their request stays the night. The next day, he has caught their cold despite the Reapers’ immunity to human illnesses. He and the protagonist realize their souls have bonded and they now share physical afflictions. Consequently, they agree to extend their bet by three days.

On the eighth day, they go on a date to a firework festival and affirm their mutual feelings of love. They spend the night together while contemplating their uncertain future. The next morning, Casper leaves for his regular work and remotely chats with the protagonist. The app is suddenly hacked by an unknown person who threatens them both. Casper takes the protagonist to the Underworld for their safety. The protagonist encounters Casper’s former mentor and the unknown hacker, a Reaper bearing the designation 5012. He demands that they forfeit their soul.

If the protagonist fails to outwit 5012, Casper sacrifices himself to save them and 5012 erases the protagonist’s memories before sending them back to the human world. Otherwise, Casper and the protagonist find a way to be together by either becoming mortals, forming a protective barrier with their souls, or joining a Reaper revolt.

== Development ==
A Date with Death was developed by Two and a Half Studios, an Australian independent game developer. They released A Date with Death in December 2023 as freeware.

A paid DLC expansion for the game adding a new ending among other supplementary content was released alongside the base game. A second expansion, titled Beyond the Bet, released on December 8th, 2024. It was funded on Kickstarter, where it successfully raised AU$277,600 out of the original AU$28,000 goal.

On May 18th, 2024, a teaser for a free update adding voice acting for English and Japanese was uploaded to YouTube, with English voice acting provided by Jonah Scott. The update patch for voice acting was released on April 21st, 2026.

On June 8, 2024, a trailer for A Date with Death was showcased at the Future of Play Direct for Summer Games Fest 2024. The trailer also announced a release date of December 8 for Beyond the Bet.

The art and guide book for A Date With Death released on December 9th, 2024, as a PDF download. On December 17th, the prequel webcomic A Date with Death ZERO was launched on Webtoon and Tapas.

== Reception ==
PC Gamer's Jonathan Bolding was pleased with the game's amount of content given its status as freeware. Jou Lee Yang of The Boss Rush Network scored A Date with Death a perfect 5/5, praising its writing, characterization, artwork, and soundtrack. Jenni Lada of Siliconera wrote positively of its humor and replayability. Speaking of the various dialogue options, she elaborated, "These might not all help shape the ending, but they build up insight into the character and make it feel like you’re connecting in a significant way."

Reviewing the Beyond the Bet expansion, Lada praised the pacing and new endings.
