= Hanako Games =

British video game development company

Hanako Games is an independent video game development company founded by Georgina Bensley that creates fantasy and anime-inspired PC games, mostly involving female protagonists.

Their website includes free demos and wallpapers for their games, including Fatal Hearts, Cute Knight, Summer Session, and Science Girls. Hanako Games is an affiliate of Winter Wolves, Tycoon Games and sakevisual.

In 2015, Hanako Games founded the games publisher called Hanabira. This publisher launched its first game called Sword Daughter on January 5, 2015. The game story was originally based on a gamebook of the Dragontales series written by Rhondi A. Vilott Salsitz which was first published in the 1980s. In 2016, the game A Little Lily Princess was also released under the Hanabira label. It is a visual novel game with simulation elements and is based on the novel A Little Princess by Frances Hodgson Burnett.

== History ==
Founder Georgina Bensley released a text adventure game in 2000 under the name Papillon. She created another game after 5 years (2005) called Cute Knight. This might not be Hanako Games's first release, but it was the first to be redistributed by other companies.

== Awards ==
In 2007, Hanako Games was awarded the top prize at Innovate 2007, sponsored by the Casual Games Association.

Their game called Black Closet was also nominated as a finalist for the Excellence in Narrative category for the 2016 Independent Games Festival.

== Developed games ==
as Hanako Games

| Release date | Title(s) | Genre(s) |
|---|---|---|
| 2003 | Charm School | Role-playing video game |
| 2003 | Sweet Dreams | Adventure game |
| 2004 | Pentagraph | Puzzle video game |
| 2004 | Classroom Chaos | Strategy video game |
| 2005 | Summer Schoolgirls | Life simulation game |
| 2005 | Cute Knight | Role-playing video game |
| 2007 | Fatal Hearts | Visual novel |
| 2007 | Cute Knight Deluxe | Role-playing video game |
| 2008 | Summer Session | Dating sim |
| 2009 | Science Girls! | Role-playing video game |
| 2009 | Cute Knight Kingdom | Role-playing video game |
| 2010 | Date Warp | Visual novel |
| 2011 | Magical Diary: Horse Hall | Life simulation/Role-playing hybrid |
| 2012 | Long Live the Queen | Life simulation game |
| 2013 | The Confines of the Crown | Visual novel |
| 2015 | Black Closet | Strategy game / Detective Game |
| 2020 | Magical Diary: Wolf Hall | Life simulation/Role-playing hybrid |
| 2021 | Cute Bite | Role-playing video game |
| 2022 | Night Cascades | Visual novel |
| 2025 | Galaxy Princess Zorana | Life simulation game |

as Hanabira

| Release date | Title(s) | Genre(s) |
|---|---|---|
| 2015 | Sword Daughter | Visual novel |
| 2016 | A Little Lily Princess | Dating sim |
| 2017 | England Exchange – An International Affair | Dating sim |
