= The Magickers =

2001 children's novel series

The Magickers is a series of children's fantasy novels by author Rhondi A. Vilott Salsitz under the pseudonym Emily Drake. Four books were published between 2001 and 2004, and an omnibus edition, The Magickers Chronicles, was published in 2010.

== The Books ==
- The Magickers

In The Magickers, eleven-year-old Jason's dreams of attending a summer soccer camp are dashed when he is injured during tryouts. Just as he accepts that he must spend the summer with his grandmother, he receives an invitation to Camp Ravenwyng, a summer camp for the Talented. Jason is skeptical when he meets the oddly dressed counselors who usher him onto the camp bus. When the bus appears to crash into the side of a mountain only to come out on the other side of a dark tunnel, Jason realizes that this summer will not be ordinary. Jason eventually learns that his talent is to be a Magicker—one who can focus for good the force of magic that exists in the earth. His new talents are tested severely as he and his new friends must save the camp from certain destruction by the Dark Hand, those who would use magic for evil.

- The Curse of Arkady

Jason Adrian and his friends survived Magic Camp. But can they survive the beastly minions of the Dark Hand, who seem to have followed them home? After an exciting summer away at Camp Ravenwyng, Jason, Bailey, and the other Magickers return home to start school. The kids are adjusting to their new magick skills, and many challenges face them in the weeks ahead. Not only must they learn to live in the "real" world without talking about their Talent, but the Dark Hand is also seeking them, and the elders have still not found a safe haven for them. As Halloween approaches, the young magickers experience vivid nightmares and are stalked by wolf jackals. All of them are finally drawn to the old McHenry house, where a decisive confrontation takes place with Brennard, leader of the Dark Hand. The Dark Hand attempts to force Jason to open the Fire Gate which would have trapped them but using the drop of water sealed inside it, Garvan's focus crystal, Jason instead opens the Water Gate through which they escape to Haven then back home.

- The Dragon Guard

As the Magickers try to find the third and most important Gate into Haven, the elder members are struck by a strange ailment that drains their power and ages them. And the Dark Hand is more than willing to take advantage of the Magickers' weakness to strike. Even when Jason does find the Dragon Gate, the final gate to Haven it is not going to be easy to open, as he must first defeat the intelligent dragon that guards it.

- The Gate of Bones

The Magickers have gained permanent access to the realm of Haven. But the forces of the Dark Hand are about to release a maelstrom of evil energy that could destroy not only the Magickers, but all of Haven..

- The Prince of Nowhere

The fifth book has been self published on Amazon, as of (02/24/2021). She finished writing it, to give fans a conclusion to the series. Previously, it was available chapter-by-chapter, as she wrote it. You could gain access by paying a small fee. Chapters came out irregularly and eventually stopped all together. It was also dropped from her newsletters after a time. It came as a surprise when it was announced that the completed book was being released in a short amount of time.

== The Old Magickers ==
The original Magickers are made up of a few of the older magickers that one way or another survived the backlash of Bernard and Gregory's battle.

Gavan- an older man who is the leader of the magickers

Eleanora Andarielle - Gregory's daughter as well as a magicker

FireAnn- Acts as the cook at the camp but also shows a skill for making potions

Tomaz Crowfeather- A native American Magicker. Although it is never stated explicitly, it is suspected that he is a Beast Speaker. He has two familiars, a pair of ravens. In the third book, he also leaves for a time, working with a pack of wolfjackals who do not follow the Dark Hand

Anita Patel- A camp doctor, helps the campers with even the oddest of injuries, including magical poisonings, burns, and bites.

Adam Sousa-

== The New Magickers ==
Jason--Jason is the leader of the 7 kids who hid and stayed behind when the others from the camp were sent home with their memories of what really happened at camp erased, when the camp was attacked by the dark hand. Jason has the rare ability to be a Gatekeeper, meaning he can open and close the gates that lead between different worlds and dimensions. The first gate he opens is the Iron Gate which he accidentally found on the other side of the Ravenwyng Lake. By opening this gate at the end of the 1st book he saves the camp. Later, he opens the Water Gate (the second book) and the Dragon Gate (the third book.) The last gate required that he defeat the Dragon that guarded the gate which he succeeded in doing. Barley, the dragon, later become a friend of his and occasionally helps the magickers. By opening all three gates Jason makes it possible for them to get into the magical dimension of Haven.

Bailey--Is a Beast speaker. Her familiar is a little pack rat whose eyes she can see through with a bit of practice, she later adopts a wolfjackal pup who parents are killed in the battle at the end of Gate Of Bones. She is best friend with Ting. In the first book Bailey has an accident that causes her to vanish into thin air. The older magickers are at a loss as to what happened until Jason realizes that Bailey is not lost in space but rather in time. She had managed to put herself slightly out of sync with the rest of the world. She is then quickly retrieved, no worse for her adventure.

Stefan--Is a SkinWalker, who, when he gets upset or stressed he turns into a young Grizzly bear. During Gate of Bones he learns to use a sword and is found to be a berserker.

Trent--Trent is the oddball of the magickers group as he does not have magick that works the same way as the others. While the others can form Shields or throw bolts of energy, he can see thing they cannot. This becomes very helpful as he can see the magic that makes up trap spells and such, allowing them to get into the Dark Hand's base undetected.

Ting--Ting was average as far as abilities, until at the Gate Of Bones when she gets the pearl her grandfather once used for magic, and gains the ability to become a small pink Oriental dragon. In dragon form she is only about 2 feet long and is jokingly called a "Hedge Dragon" by Bailey, who is her best friend

Rich--Rich is Stefan's friend and keeps him out of trouble when he turns into his bear form.

Henry--Henry shows an amazingly powerful talent for fire magic to the point where he burned his eyebrows off at one point while he was learning to make their crystals glow. Jonnar manages to link Henry to himself at some point, though, and is continuously draining his magic which makes Henry very weak.

== The Dark Hand ==
The Dark Hand are a group of Magickers who come off as evil and that may be what they are now but the original reasons for what they do are understandable. It is their belief that magic is a finite thing and that once you use it up, it is gone. They want to destroy the Magickers because they believe them to be naively wasting magic and will do whatever they have to do stop them because they do not want to leave everyone with nothing. This argument began with the Magickers Brennard and Gregory. Brennard believed that magic was finite and they had to stop all the wasting magic on foolish and stupid things. Gregory believed that, like water when you use it, then it goes through the cycle to be used again. This argument eventually descended into a catastrophic magical battle which ended with Brennard weakened nearly to death and Gregory in a magical coma. The resulting shock wave of magic killed many Magickers, as well as throwing some through time, and putting others, like Gregory, in a coma. The first member of the dark hand seen in the book is Jonnard, Brennard's son. After Jason becomes suspicious of things happening around camp, he is attacked by Jonnard who tries to steal his magic. Jason fights back and manages to escape, however Jonnard also escapes before Jason can return with the older magickers.

Brennard--The Magickers that fought Gregory and disagreed with his theories of magic

Jonnard--Brennard's son, evil and cruel, is the one the younger magickers most often end up fighting
