= Date Warp =

2010 video game

- Developers: Spiky Caterpillar; Hanako Games
- Publisher: Hanako Games
- Engine: Ren'Py
- Platforms: Windows, Mac OS X, Linux
- Release: May 22, 2010
- Genre: Visual novel
- Mode: Single-player

Date Warp is a science fiction visual novel video game developed by Spiky Caterpillar and Hanako Games, and published by Hanako Games for Microsoft Windows, Mac OS and Linux in 2010. The game uses anime-style graphics and is written in English and tells a story of a young Indian-American college female student who goes on a date and disappears.

== Gameplay ==
As Date Warp is a visual novel, the player reads through the story and makes choices at crucial points to change the outcome, leading to eleven different endings. The game also contains small puzzles which must be solved in order to make those choices.

== Plot ==
The story begins with Janet and Bradley, the young couple on their first date, arriving by chance at a mysterious mansion in the woods after their car breaks down in the rain. They seek shelter inside and find a mismatched group of handsome young men staying at the mansion. After staying the night, they try to leave, and the story takes the first of many surprise turns. Each path through the game reveals only a fraction of the story until finally all the elements are in place and the true ending is unlocked.

=== Characters ===
- Janet Bhaskar: A freshman at Brook College, previously a socially-isolated student at the top of her high school class.
- Bradley Dalton: A cheerful jock who's been asking every freshman girl on exactly one date each.
- Nathaniel: A polite and wealthy gentleman offering assistance to those in need.
- Alben: A mysteriously hostile young man.
- Linds: A lecherous scientist.
- Rafael: A soft-spoken young man who takes care of others but dodges questions about his past.

== Development ==
The game was created with the visual novel engine Ren'Py. On May 15, 2010, the opening trailer was released on YouTube. Hanako Games released a free demo of the game on their website. The opening theme is What Lies Beyond composed by Matthew Myers from LeetStreet Boys. On September 6, 2014, an updated version called Date Warp: Silver Edition was released, following the release on Steam. One puzzle and plot element has been changed, the user interface has been changed to a more sci-fi style, and a new CG and an epilogue was added. Furthermore, the engine has been upgraded to a new version.

== Reception ==
Date Warp received moderate to positive reception. Gamertell gave 92/100 to the game writing: "The character art is appealing, the puzzles to unlock answers are a nice diversion and, most importantly, it is well written. Hanako Games and Spiky Caterpillar did a wonderful job of creating a visual novel that both men and women will enjoy." GameZebo gave 3 of 5 stars and wrote: "If you're part of that niche audience that Date Warp caters to then you'll enjoy the branching storylines and cute art style, and will no doubt have fun trying to unlock all of the endings." Gamasutra wrote: "Date/Warp is trying to do some cool things through its interactivity, but it could have stood to be a good deal more procedural."
