= Milk Inside a Bag of Milk Inside a Bag of Milk =

2020 video game

- Developer: Nikita Kryukov
- Publishers: Missing Calm; Forever Entertainment
- Composer: Nikita Kryukov
- Engine: Ren'Py
- Platforms: Microsoft Windows; macOS; Linux; Nintendo Switch
- Release: macOS, Linux, Windows: WW: 26 August 2020; Nintendo Switch: WW: 11 November 2022
- Genre: Visual novel
- Mode: Single player

Milk Inside a Bag of Milk Inside a Bag of Milk (stylized as Milk inside a bag of milk inside a bag of milk…) is a 2020 psychological horror visual novel game developed by Russian game developer Nikita Kryukov. The game centers around an unnamed female protagonist who visits a nearby grocery market to purchase a bag of milk, but is troubled with the challenges of suffering from severe trauma. The player plays as a voice inside her head with which she shares an inner monologue.

The game was published to Steam by Missing Calm on 26 August 2020. A sequel, Milk Outside a Bag of Milk Outside a Bag of Milk, was released on 16 December 2021. On 11 November 2022, the game and its sequel were ported to the Nintendo Switch by Forever Entertainment.

== Plot ==
Gameplay screenshot

The game begins from the first-person perspective, where the player accompanies the girl to the grocery store to pick up a bag of milk for the character's mother. The girl's walk is made extremely difficult by her inability to hypothetically speak a sentence to the cashier, and by her obsessive realization that one foot was walking on the asphalt, and the other on the grass, to which the player must try to teach her how to walk properly. Once inside the store, the player must navigate and remind the girl to get the milk and pay for it, which is made difficult by her hallucinations and inability to properly communicate with others.

Once outside, the character walks close to a gas station and is nearly struck by a truck, but hallucinates a bear passing her by instead. The player can choose two different ways to confront the girl about her problems, but either path chosen leads to the character breaking the fourth wall and imagining herself speaking to the player directly. In this conversation, the player is informed about the traumas the character has faced, such as her father's suicide and the mental troubles she has had ever since. The player then interrupts her and advises her to head back home. The girl explains that the medicine causes her to hear "terrible and unpleasant melodies" which stop after her medicine wears off. After spending time on the rooftop of her apartment building, she heads back downstairs where her mother orders her to go to bed.

== Reception ==
Lilia Hellal of Rice Digital praised the game's unique visuals and storytelling, writing that "Equipped with a strong, distinctive production style thanks to its disturbing retro art and the foreboding discomfort of its droning music, it's a memorable indie gem that will never be forgotten once experienced". Jesse Grodman from DreadXP likewise found the game's visual style, writing and aesthetics "fantastic", but notes that what makes the game really great is how it handles the subject matter of mental health, suicidal thoughts and familial abuse. Kyle Caldwell at Pixel Die found the game to be short and tight, and surprisingly effective in getting the player to care about the protagonist in the short amount of time you get to spend with her. John Walker of Buried Treasure rated the game 8/10 and found that it dealt with the subject of trauma in an especially honest matter not in spite of, but because the player is unable to save the protagonist. Kohei Fujita of IGN Japan placed the game at eighth on his personal 2022 game of the year list.

== Sequel ==
On 19 February 2021, Kryukov announced that a sequel was in development. On 16 December 2021, the sequel was published by Kryukov under the title Milk Outside a Bag of Milk Outside a Bag of Milk, colloquially referred to as Milk 2.

The sequel continues the story where the previous installment ends. After purchasing the bag of milk in the original installment, the girl returns home, where her abusive mother confronts and attacks her. After the attack, the girl retreats to her bedroom, where she prepares for the night and attempts to fall asleep. The sequel contains short but fully animated cutscenes and branching paths with alternate endings. The graphics are less abstract and no longer rendered in monochrome. While the original game was mostly told from a first-person perspective, the sequel is set from a third-person perspective. The game takes on a style that is more common among visual novels where text boxes are accompanied by a drawing of their speaker.

Kerry Brunskill of PC Gamer praised the game for not succumbing to the "natural urge" to provide a fix-it for its suffering protagonist, writing that "this lack of answers or any insulting magical fix for a serious and all-consuming state of being hit my soul with the force of a hurricane."
