= Magical Diary =

2011 video game

- Developers: Hanako Games and Spiky Caterpillar
- Publisher: Hanako Games
- Engine: Ren'Py
- Platforms: Windows, macOS, Linux
- Release: June 19, 2011
- Genre: Visual novel
- Mode: Single-player

Magical Diary is a visual novel video game series that takes place at a magical school and includes romance elements. The series is developed and published by Hanako Games.

The first game in the series, now known as Magical Diary: Horse Hall, features a young freshman magical girl. It was released on June 19, 2011 for Windows, macOS and Linux. The game was later released on Steam with some bonus content.

A second game, Magical Diary: Wolf Hall, was released in 2020 featuring a male protagonist.

== Gameplay ==
As it is a visual novel, the player reads through the story and makes choices at crucial points to change the outcome, leading to different endings. The player can create a custom female student. The game also contains puzzles in which the player has to use spells to pass the exam. Every puzzle has multiple solutions.

== Plot ==
A player controlled avatar has been invited to attend a magical school. Here the avatar can make new friends, learn dozens of spells, face exams in the school dungeons, run for class office, and try to find a date for the May Day Ball. There are many students at Iris Academy and they are all divided up into Magical Halls; for the girls there are the Horse Hall, the Butterfly Hall, and the Snake Hall. The boys are divided in the Wolf Hall, the Falcon Hall, and the Toad Hall.

== Characters ==
- Mary Sue (default name): The player character. She is a wildseed freshman from New Hampshire. She is good at running and likes sports but does not like to sing in public.
- Virginia Danson: Virginia is the player character's roommate. She has two older brothers, William and Donald.
- Ellen Middleton: Ellen is another roommate of the player character. A wildseed who has a complicated relationship with her mother and stepfather. A smart girl and diligent student.
- Damien Ramsey: He is a senior student from Falcon hall. If the player character agrees to complete the initiation, he becomes her senior.
- Professor Grabiner: Professor Hieronymous Grabiner teaches Red and Blue magic.
- Donald Danson: Donald is Virginia's older brother from Wolf hall. He is mischievous and spends a lot of time in detentions.

Non-romance choices:

- Professor Potsdam: Professor Petunia Potsdam teaches Green, White and Black magic.
- William Danson: William is a Senior and was Class President. He is the oldest brother of Virginia and Donald. He also had Ellen Middleton (above) as his freshman in Initiation.

== Reception ==
Magical Diary received positive reception. The game received 4 of 5 stars on Gamezebo with reviewer Cassandra Khaw writing: "A dating sim at heart, Magical Diary's anime-inspired visuals lend well to the atmosphere. [...] Charmingly indie, Magical Diary is definitely worth the purchase." Gamertell gave it a score of 87/100, opining it is "a great example of the recent assortment of games for girls inspired by the Princess Maker model and the possible trophies to earn provide even more incentive to keep replaying to discover as much as you can about Iris Academy and its characters." JayIsGames wrote about the game: "Despite a few hiccups and quibbles, Magical Diary: Horse Hall is probably the best visual novel/life simulation out there in its fantasy genre right now." Rock, Paper, Shotgun review stated: "As it is, almost all the replayability is on the story side, especially on the romance side, and even with a fast-forward button to skip scenes you've already seen, you'll be wading through a lot of the same text as you poke around. That's standard practice for this kind of game though, and Magical Diary is better about it than many imported Japanese ones I've seen [...]"
