= Juniper's Knot =

2012 video game

- Cover art
- Developer: Dischan Media
- Publisher: Dischan Media
- Programmers: Terrence Smith; Anton Prydatko (iOS)
- Artist: Saimon Ma
- Writer: Terrence Smith
- Composer: Kristian Jensen
- Engine: Ren'Py
- Platforms: Windows, OS X, Linux
- Release: NA: April 13, 2012
- Genre: Visual novel
- Mode: Single-player

Juniper's Knot is a kinetic visual novel developed by Canadian studio Dischan Media. Created in under a month, Juniper's Knot revolves around a lost boy and an imprisoned demoness, as they help overcome each other's obstacles through wit and memory, respectively.

== Plot ==
The main characters

In the world of Juniper's Knot, fiends (demons) unconsciously drain the life of those around them to keep themselves alive; this results in a barren, run-down town that surrounds the manor in which the fiend is trapped. The manner of dress, and details about the daily life of the boy would hint that the story is set around the Industrial Revolution.

The boy was born and raised in the area of Moor, a fictional industrial town. The fiend finds that he smells of black oil, horses, and herbs; he explains that this is because he worked with his parents as a farmer, and as an oil delivery boy inside the city.

The fiend was born many centuries ago in a moor. She has committed many different deeds and atrocities for mankind, including: destroying a whole village, saving a baby, causing a divorce, etc.; however, she states that none of these are the reasons as to why she has been trapped in the magic circle, as it no longer matters. Despite her considerable age, the fiend appears as a young adult. She harbors feelings of resentment towards humanity as a whole, as her best friend, "a 'miss'", was beaten and raped by men; the fiend buried her friend before returning to massacre the entire town.

The novel begins with a centuries-old fiend as she thinks about her current situation, stuck in a weathered, run-down ballroom with nothing but fire and rubble at her side. Soon after, a lost boy enters the room, and sees the fiend. The fiend starts talking to the boy as well as teasing him for her amusement, much to the wary boy's chagrin. Insisting on making him tell her a story, the fiend gets the boy to tell her a story about the trickery of demons; after which the boy decides to leave, but before the boy leaves, the fiend sticks out her hand, begging him not to. As she does, her hand passes the magical boundary, causing it to burst into flame. Healing from the injury, the fiend's actions make the boy curious enough to stay and listen to the fiend.

When the fiend offers to cook some nuts for the boy, he accepts, accidentally making a pact with her. As the nuts cook over the fire, the boy and fiend share stories about their past. Afterwards, the boy eats the cooked nuts; is offered to be cooked the rest of the nuts, and makes another pact with the fiend, this time to stay until sunset; as Boy and Fiend continue talking, the boy falls asleep while hearing part of the fiend's story due to his tiredness, causing the fiend to go into a fit of rage. Furious that she has not been able to sleep, nor rest for the centuries that she has been stuck in the manor, the fiend starts to cry, curse, and throw the recently cooked nuts at the boy, hitting him a few times as he sleeps. Some time after the boy fell asleep, he wakes up to find a few of his nuts tangled in his hair. The fiend tries to make him leave, but the boy decides to free the fiend from her constrains by planting an olive tree in her place, as the rule of the magical circle is that one life-form enters the circle and another one leaves.

In the epilogue, both Fiend and Boy walk away from the ruins to find a way to Moor. The fiend comments on how she feels "tired"; but also that she now has reason to "stay awake for a little longer."

== Development ==
=== Symbolism ===
The title of Juniper's Knot was chosen for its symbolic nature; for example, "Juniper" is an allusion to both the saint known for his patience, and the given name that symbolises chastity. "Knot" represents the fiend's magical barrier, a circle which imprisons her from the rest of the world. The resulting title — "Juniper's Knot" — foreshadows the story without being direct. The writer of the story, Terrence Smith, compares "Juniper's Knot" as a forced chastity that will take a long time to end; although, he says that the meaning is also open to interpretation.

=== Soundtrack ===
The Music of Juniper's Knot

Soundtrack album by Kristian "CombatPlayer" Jensen
- Length: 18:47
No.	Title	Length
1.	"Grin Archaic"	2:05
2.	"Politely Honest"	1:47
3.	"Politely Honest (Soft)"	2:01
4.	"An Olive Tree"	1:44
5.	"Bleeding"	2:20
6.	"All Dried Out"	1:39
7.	"Stella"	2:07
8.	"Open My Heart"	2:08
9.	"Outside" (Bonus song)	2:44

== Reception ==
Juniper's Knot received generally positive reviews for its story and visuals. IndieGames.com weblogger Cassandra Khaw did the same, praising Juniper's Knot for "being an oddly lovely experience", with an original story and "an abundance of … anime-inspired artwork". International – especially German – reception was also generally positive, although critical of the lack of choices presented in the game.
