= Doomed Love: A Journey through German Genre Films =

- Directed by: Dominik Graf; Johannes F. Sievert
- Written by: Dominik Graf; Johannes F. Sievert
- Produced by: Johannes F. Sievert; Jan Löffler
- Cinematography: Hendrik A. Kley
- Edited by: Patricia Testor; Claudia Wolscht; Sebastian Bonde
- Music by: Florian van Volxem; Sven Rossenbach
- Release date: 2016
- Running time: 90 minutes
- Country: Germany
- Language: German

Doomed Love: A Journey through German Genre Films is a 2016 documentary film by Dominik Graf and Johannes F. Sievert, which describes forgotten German film genre and follows the counter-movement to the New German Cinema and its influence on film culture. The documentary contains interviews with seventeen filmmakers, film critics and film historians.

== Synopsis ==
The film is a documentary that searches for traces of undiscovered German film history. It is an essay on the often-forgotten German cinema genre.

The 1970s and 80s saw the emergence of a series of unusually physical and short films that depart from the idyllically stylised post-war film, at the same time set themselves apart from the more intellectual contemporaries of New German Cinema. In interview, the directors describe this often overlooked chapter of German film history, and reflects on what ultimately led to its end.

== Production ==
The documentary uses film clips and photos along with recent interviews with the filmmakers at the time. The documentary was written and directed by Dominik Graf and Johannes F. Sievert. The film was produced for the WDR and the Arte and produced by the North Rhine-Westphalia Media Foundation.

Doomed Love: A Journey through German Genre Films had its world premiere at the 66th Berlin International Film Festival as part of the Forum and was subsequently screened at numerous film festivals in Germany and abroad, such as Locarno Film Festival, the Shanghai International Film Festival, The Festival of German Films, and Besonders Wertlos Festival and others.

The film was nominated by the BVR for the Metropolis 2016 Director's Award in the category "Best Documentary Director".

The sequel Open Wound German Film was shown for the first time at the 67th Berlin International Film Festival in 2017.
