= Exogenesis: Perils of Rebirth =

2019 science-fiction adventure video game & visual novel

- Developer: Kwan
- Publisher: Sekai Project
- Composers: John DelVento, Florenz Sisson, Jonathan Mayer
- Engine: Ren'Py (demo); Unity
- Platforms: Linux; Windows; OS X
- Release: April 19, 2019 (early access)
- Genres: Visual novel, adventure game
- Mode: Single-player

Exogenesis: Perils of Rebirth is an unfinished science fiction adventure game/visual novel developed by Kwan for Microsoft Windows, OS X, and Linux.

== Gameplay ==
The game alternates between point-and-click adventure sections in first person, in which the player explores the environment and solves puzzles, and visual novel sections in which the game's plot is told and the player influences the outcome of dialogs with other characters. Kwan says they were inspired by Shu Takumi's game series Ace Attorney, and Kotaro Uchikoshi's Nine Hours, Nine Persons, Nine Doors and Zero Escape: Virtue's Last Reward.

== Plot ==
The game begins during a treasure hunt in 2069 in a post-apocalyptic Japan, where the treasure hunter group Durchhalten accidentally activates a trap, resulting in one of the members, Miho Sayashi, getting impaled by spears and dying. The treasure hunt is canceled, and the group ends up splitting up.

Two years later, Miho's brother Yu and another former Durchhalten member, Toshio Taro, find out that Noah's Ark actually exists, and that it contains the Lazarus Protocol, a machine that is said to be able to recreate things from the past. Yu plans to reunite Durchhalten, and to use the Lazarus Protocol to bring Miho back to life.

== Development ==
The game was successfully funded with a crowdfunding campaign on Kickstarter; its goal was $32,000, and by the end of the crowdfunding period, $56,288 had been pledged by backers.

Kwan released a demo during the Kickstarter campaign with a length of 3–4 hours, containing about 80% of the first chapter. In May 2014, a German demo was released.

The game was originally set to be released in December 2014, but was delayed. It was initially developed with the visual novel engine Ren'Py, but was then ported to Unity in order to make console releases possible. As of August 2025, the last update from the developers was in December 2020.

== See also ==
- Abandonware
