= Long Live the Queen (video game) =

2012 visual novel

- Developers: Hanako Games; Spiky Caterpillar
- Publishers: Hanako Games; Ratalaika Games
- Engine: Ren'Py
- Platforms: Windows, Mac OS X, Linux, PlayStation 4, PlayStation 5, Nintendo Switch, Xbox One, Xbox Series
- Release: June 2, 2012
- Genres: Role-playing Game, Political simulation, Raising simulation
- Mode: Single player

Long Live the Queen is a simulation role-playing video game developed by Hanako Games and Spiky Caterpillar, published by Hanako Games. The story of the game follows a young princess who is training to become queen after the death of her mother. The objective of the game is to keep the princess alive for 40 weeks until she turns 15 and is crowned. The game was released on June 2, 2012 for Windows, Mac OS and Linux. The game uses anime-style graphics and is written in English.

In July 2022, Long Live the Queen was released on PlayStation 4, PlayStation 5, Xbox One, Xbox Series, and Nintendo Switch by Ratalaika Games. It was also translated into French, Spanish, German, and Japanese.

== Gameplay ==
Political intrigue plays a key role in the game.

The player reads through the story and schedules the protagonist's weekly lessons, on topics such as economics, intrigue, expression, military, medicine, conversation, and lumen (magic) skills. Two classes can be selected per week; A morning and an afternoon class. Based on the classes selected, Elodie increases her proficiency in various skills. Additionally, during the weekend Elodie has free run of the castle and can choose an activity that alters her mood. She has four emotional axes, and her position on each determines her proficiency at learning certain topics: for instance, being "Willful" will help her master military and intrigue skills easier, but it will also hamper learning civil skills like royal demeanor. Once all three sub-skills of a particular skill are raised to a certain point (≥25 each), Elodie gains an outfit that boosts that specific skill. Learning some skills unlocks additional weekend actions: for example, learning "Dance" allows her to attend balls, while "Reflexes" gives her the ability to play tennis.

As the weeks progress, Elodie is presented with various social and political opportunities. When they occur, the game performs checks against Elodie's current skills and chooses an outcome, sometimes without giving the player the option of interceding. For instance, one of the first skill checks (a snake attack) requires 10 points in the "Composure" skill. Should Elodie be successful, she calms herself, allowing Julianna, the Duchess of Ursul, to kill the snake; should she fail, her cousin gets bitten, an event whose consequences can be felt in certain paths the game can take. This is also impacted by whether you let Julianna stay, sent her away, or imprisoned her. If she is not there to kill the snake, there is separate dialogue for you and your cousin attempting to handle the snake on your own, revealing a secret about your cousin that may expand your choices later in the story. Most of the checks can be failed without serious consequence, but some can close off entire branches of the story. Very often, however, passing or failing a skill check is a matter of life or death for Elodie: if her skills aren't up to par, she may die (in one of 11 possible ways).

Because of the branching decision trees, the game features multiple endings, varying according to whom Elodie marries, how she dealt with neighboring nations, her ability with magic, the fate of her father Joslyn, and—of course—whether she survived to her coronation at all.

== Plot ==
Fidelia, the queen of Nova, has recently died. Her daughter, the 14-year-old princess Elodie, must leave her schooling to ready herself to become the next queen. Her coronation is set for 40 weeks from the present—her 15th birthday. Many people in the kingdom are trying to take advantage of the recent monarch's death and attempt to kill Elodie.

== Development ==
The game was developed by Hanako Games, which also created Cute Knight, Cute Knight Kingdom, and Magical Diary, all of which are designed for girls but appeal to a wider audience. Long Live The Queen has darker themes than the previous titles.

A free update for the game was released on January 26, 2015 adding new characters, story elements and endings and other content to the game.

== Follow-up game ==
On November 21, 2025, a follow-up game, Galaxy Princess Zorana, was released.

== Reception ==
Reception

Aggregate score
Aggregator	Score
Metacritic	(PC) 67/100 (NS) 73/100

Review scores
Publication	Score
Eurogamer	7/10
PC Gamer (US)	65/100

Long Live the Queen received "mixed or average" reviews according to review aggregator Metacritic.

Technology Tell gave a score of 90/100 to the game, writing: "It's really an unusual adventure and I admire Hanako Games and Spiky Caterpillar for stepping a little outside their comfort zone to release a darker game that requires players to think smart and manage emotions to keep a character alive." IndieGames reviewed it positively, writing: "Long story short, Long Live The Queen is a solid title."
