= Doomed Love (game) =

2021 visual novel by David B. Cooper

- Developer: David B. Cooper
- Publisher: David B. Cooper
- Director: David B. Cooper
- Programmer: David B. Cooper
- Artist: David B. Cooper
- Composer: David B. Cooper
- Series: Doom
- Engine: Ren'Py
- Platforms: Windows macOS
- Release: June 11, 2021
- Genre: Point-and-click dating simulator visual novel fangame
- Mode: Single-player

Doomed Love is a point-and-click visual novel released on Itch.io on June 11, 2021, that serves as an unofficial adaptation of the 1993 video game Doom as a dating sim. It was programmed, illustrated, and composed by Scottish cartoonist David B. Cooper, with an updated version releasing June 18. The game was designed in response to a Tweet received by Cooper in response to "cute" fan art he had drawn of Doom's demon characters, deriding the original Doom series as "too violent" by comparison to the fan art. Recurring The Simpsons character Lenny Leonard is also included in the game, in reference to "Sad Springfield" fan art of Cooper's which had gone viral earlier that year. The fangame has received positive critical reception, with Doom co-creator John Romero praising the game and his own inclusion in it.

== Gameplay ==
Doomed Love is a visual novel dating sim with a point and click interface. The player assumes the role of Doomguy, the only zombieman in a high school of demons but for John Romero, as they seek to find a date for the upcoming Icon of Sin Festival. The game is divided up into several levels, each of which takes the form of a new day. Each level begins with Doomguy preparing for the day and ends with them finishing school; in between, Doomguy is tasked with various missions, which usually involve them engaging in mundane activities with the four possible love interests covering various levels of romance, with a total of five different endings. When not on a mission, the player is given free roam over a small area of their high school, which includes a stage, and the homes of their friends. There are several side quests that the player can engage in when not on missions, which unlock an extended ending to the game.

== Development ==
Addressing the inspiration behind the conception of the game, Cooper stated that "I did some Doom fan art a wee while back and one person commented how they loved the art, but they'd tried playing Doom and it made them anxious. I jokingly said to them how I'd put these 'cuter' monsters in a dating sim — not really intending to make it. But then the idea just seemed so good in my head, and it kind of grew from there." before elaborating further about creating the game over the course of "a month, maybe a little longer. I had to make it when I wasn't doing my full-time job or watching my son, so it was solid work in evenings and weekends, but luckily the Ren'Py software was really easy to use."

== Reception ==
PC Gamer praised the game as "charming", complimenting its "goofy, anxious and lovable" characters and use of "adorable" art and "a midi soundtrack that reworks the original Doom's crunchy audio barks into pleasant piano melodies." Vice described the game as "a delightful time", lauding its use of "characters [which] are well drawn enough that it's easy to relate to them, and even fall in love." Italy 24News described the game as a "decidedly crazy visual novel with all the trappings" of an "over-the-top" dating simulator, praising its inclusiveness and willingness to "let love blossom wherever it wants."

John Romero, one of the game developers of Doom, responded positively to Doomed Love on Twitter.
