= Rhondi A. Vilott Salsitz =

American novelist

Rhondi Ann Salsitz
- Born: Rhondi Ann Vilott; November 23, 1949; Phoenix, Arizona, U.S.
- Died: July 29, 2024 (aged 74); Fullerton, California, U.S.
- Occupation: Author
- Spouse: Howard Salsitz JD (1978– Forever)
- Children: Maureen Salsitz PhD, Jessica Ervin MBA, James Greening, Aaron Salsitz
- Writing career
- Pen name: Sara Hanover, Emily Drake, Anne Knight, Elizabeth Forrest, Charles Ingrid, Rhondi Vilott Salsitz, R.A.V. Salsitz, Rhondi Vilott, Rhondi Greening, and Jenna Rhodes.
- Period: 1982–2024
- Genres: Science fiction, fantasy, Mystery, Thrillers, "HEA" Romances

Rhondi A. Vilott Salsitz, born on November 23rd, 1949, in Phoenix, Arizona, US, was a writer of science fiction, fantasy, and mystery novels. Rhondi died of cancer on July 29, 2024 in Fullerton, California.

She wrote under the names Sara Hanover, Emily Drake, Anne Knight, Elizabeth Forrest, Charles Ingrid, Rhondi Greening, Rhondi Vilott Salsitz, Jenna Rhodes, R.A.V. Salsitz, and Rhondi Vilott.

== Bibliography ==
Crossroads of Darkover anthology (June 2018) "Trust" by Jenna Rhodes

Guilds & Glaives anthology (September 2018) "Rainbow Dark" by Jenna Rhodes

Tales of Plexis anthology (December 2018) "The Locksmith's Dilemma" by Rhondi Salsitz

Her works include: The New Improved Sorceress DAW (January 2020) as Sara Hanover

The Late Great Wizard DAW (September 2018) as Sara Hanover

The Elven Ways series (epic fantasy) as Jenna Rhodes

- The Queen of Storm and Shadow DAW (May 2017)
- The King of Assassins DAW (November 2014)
- The Dark Ferryman (The Elven Ways: Book Two) DAW (June 2008)
- The Four Forges (The Elven Ways: Book One) DAW (May 2006)

The Magickers Chronicles Volume 1 (July 2010) as Emily Drake

The Magickers Chronicles Volume 2 (October 2010) as Emily Drake

The Marked Man omnibus December 2002

Sand Wars series (military science fiction, as Charles Ingrid):

Sand Wars omnibus Volumes 1 & 2 (2001)

- The Sand Wars, Volume 2 DAW
  - 6 Challenge Met DAW (August 1990)
  - 5 Return Fire DAW (August 1989)
  - 4 Alien Salute DAW (March 1989)
- The Sand Wars, Volume 1 DAW
  - 3 Celestial Hit List DAW (November 1988)
  - 2 Lasertown Blues DAW (February 1988)
  - 1 Solar Kill DAW (July 1987)

Other:

- "Strong Armed" by Rhondi Ann Murder, Mystery & Mayhem anthology (October 2017)
- "The Windlost" by Jenna Rhodes Submerged anthology (September 2017)
- Gate of Bones (The Magickers series) DAW (Sept 2004) as Emily Drake
- Dragon Guard (The Magickers series) DAW (June 2003) as Emily Drake
- Curse of Arkady (The Magickers series) DAW (June 2002) as Emily Drake
- Death Storm DAW (October 1999) as Anne Knight
- Retribution DAW (May 1998) as Elizabeth Forrest
- Bright Shadow DAW (May 1997) as Elizabeth Forrest
- Killjoy DAW (June 1996) as Elizabeth Forrest
- Soul Fire DAW (October 1995) as Charles Ingrid
- Deathwatch DAW (June 1995) as Elizabeth Forrest
- Downfall Matrix DAW (September 1994) as Charles Ingrid
- Darktide DAW (September 1993) as Elizabeth Forrest
- Twilight Gate Walker (March 1993) as Rhondi Vilott Salsitz
- Path of Fire DAW (December 1992) as Charles Ingrid
- Phoenix Fire DAW (March 1992) as Elizabeth Forrest
- Radius of Doubt DAW (October 1991) as Charles Ingrid
- Last Recall DAW (January 1991) as Charles Ingrid
- Challenge Met DAW (August 1990) as Charles Ingrid
- Night of Dragons ROC (July 1990) as R.A.V. Salsitz
- The Marked Man DAW (December 1989) as Charles Ingrid
- Return Fire DAW (August 1989) as Charles Ingrid
- Alien Salute DAW (March 1989) as Charles Ingrid
- Celestial Hit List DAW (November 1988) as Charles Ingrid
- Daughter of Destiny NAL (November 1988) as R.A.V. Salsitz
- Lasertown Blues DAW (February 1988) as Charles Ingrid
- Where Dragons Rule NAL (December 1986) as R.A.V. Salsitz
- The Unicorn Dancer NAL (July 1986) as R.A.V. Salsitz
- Where Dragons Lie NAL (December 1985) as R.A.V. Salsitz
- Yellowstone Jewel Zebra (August 1983) as Rhondi Vilott
- Her Secret Self Bantam (November 1982) as Rhondi Vilott
- The Dragontales series, 14 interactive novels from Signet Books as Rhondi Vilott.
