= Fatal Hearts =

2007 video game

- Developer: Hanako Games
- Publisher: Hanako Games
- Platform: Windows
- Release: October 23, 2007
- Genres: Visual Novel, Otome game
- Mode: Single player

Fatal Hearts is an English-language visual novel/adventure game in which players control a teenage female protagonist who is having strange dreams while people are being murdered. It was released in October 2007 for Microsoft Windows.

The game received mixed reviews by critics, citing its storyline as a strong point and the low production values as its biggest flaw.

== Gameplay ==
Like traditional adventure games, the player must solve puzzles and minigames to progress through the story, but like visual novels, the player must choose the path that the story goes down in order to reach up to 14 different endings.

== Characters ==
- Christina Robinson

The main character, who has the dreams while girls are being murdered.

- Lucy Torvill

Christina's best friend that is daring and outgoing.

- Jeremy Bowman

A clever and polite young man seeking girls who need help.

- Randy Gardner

He is cheerful and loyal, but he has a family secret.

- Tim Davies

A jokester with a very serious side.

- Elizabeth Sumners

A shy and nerdy schoolgirl who is eager to fit in with everyone else.

- A man whose name is not known

The man of Christina's dreams and her nightmares.

== Reception ==
Fatal Hearts received mixed to positive reviews upon release.

Neal Chandran of RPGFan rated the game 83/100, called the game and story engaging, despite needing more polish, and said that its replay value was high.

Erin Bell of Gamezebo rated the game 3.5/5 stars, saying that its narrative was well-written and its music and sounds were atmospheric, but criticized its low production values and the fact that the puzzles were hard to control.

Kim Wild of Adventure Gamers rated the game 2.5/5 stars, praising the amount of player choice, but criticizing the user interface as "clumsy" and the storyline and characterization "underdeveloped".
