= Cute Knight =

2005 video game

- Developer: Hanako Games
- Publisher: IWin (Deluxe)
- Platforms: Windows, Linux, Macintosh
- Release: October 13, 2005
- Genres: Life simulation, casual, role-playing, Raising simulation
- Mode: Single-player

Cute Knight is a casual life simulation role-playing video game with many possible endings and careers featuring a single female character. Gameplay is similar to the Japanese Princess Maker with a more traditionally Western first-person perspective dungeons.

== Gameplay ==
Cute Knight is a life simulation/role-playing video game where the player takes the role of Michiko from 18 to 21. (Note: Michiko is the default character name; however, the player can enter another name.) The game uses stats which determine how well she does in various tasks and her combat ability. In addition, her stats and key events determine the jobs she is able to do. The goal of the game is to unlock unlockable content and various endings, particularly good endings. The game ends after three years unless a special event ends the game sooner or Michiko's dream stat reaches 0; if the latter occurs the game still unlocks an ending, but it is always a bad ending based on her stats and key events triggered.

Tasks affect stats, generally positively. Michiko's stats determine whether the task is completed successfully in a given day, with success often resulting in monetary gain. Each task takes one week of game time unless an annual event interferes with it. In addition, these annual events last for a varying number of days. During some of these events various mini-games can occur. Winning these mini-games may trigger key events or grant items, money, and/or stats boost. The game starts out with a few available tasks, but more open up by triggering key events and/or working at a particular place for some time. Several jobs can also be removed because of key events or high level of the sin stat.

Combat occurs inside a multi-level dungeon. Time passes as the player moves through the dungeon. The player can choose to either defeat the monster in combat or attempt to tame the monster, getting it to leave Michiko alone. If the player kills a living creature (as opposed to golems or undead), it increases Michiko's sin. Sin goes down if the player works at the church or the doctor's. Combat is turn-based and features magic point-based charms (spells). These spells use nine elements, including the classical four. If Michiko's hit points (HP) drop to zero the player is automatically rescued. There is no character death, but she may need to pay to recover her lost health. Regardless, it will deplete the Dream meter during her recovery period and may lead to the bad ending.

== Development and release ==
Cute Knight was originally developed by Hanako Games and is based on the Princess Maker series. It was released online on December 31, 2005. It was later re-released on 2007 in an expanded version with updated features as Cute Knight Deluxe. This version was published by iWin and available at retail.

== Reception ==
Erin Bell of GameZebo gives the game 4/5 stars, commenting positively that the game actually enables to "role-play" Michiko allowing the player to spend their time cooking or cleaning rather than forcing them into traditional role-playing games like Dragon Quest or Final Fantasy, making Cute Knight as a short-story version of such games. She opined that Cute Knight is a great casual game stating it "strips away a lot of...weightiness while remaining true to its RPG roots. The result is a light adventure that's easy to get into and can be played in short spurts - in other words, it's perfect for the casual gamer." While her comments are generally positive, she does comment on the graphics being mediocre, but complains more about the tasks which she comments can become repetitive wishing there was some kind of mini-game to break the monotony.

Cute Knight has been the recipient of multiple nominations and awards. It was a nominee for Yahoo! Games Most Innovative Casual Game of 2006. The original game has also been nominated and awarded from other sites as well.

== Sequel ==
On November 13, 2009, a sequel Cute Knight Kingdom was officially released.
