= List of PlayStation 4 games (A–L) =

This is a list of games for the PlayStation 4. The PlayStation 4 supports both physical and digital games. Physical games are sold on Blu-ray Disc and digital games can be purchased through the PlayStation Store. (Note: Games dated November 15, 2013 (North America), November 29, 2013 (Europe) and February 22, 2014 (Japan) are launch titles for the specified regions.) See List of PlayStation 2 games for PlayStation 4 for PlayStation 2 games running on PlayStation 4 with an emulator. See List of PlayStation VR games for a larger range of dedicated PlayStation VR games.

== List ==
There are currently 3752 games on this list. (Note: This number is always up to date by this script.)

Key
3D 3D television output	C PS Camera support	CB Supports cross-buy	CP Supports cross-play	M PS Move support	P Pro enhanced	PL PlayLink	VR Virtual Reality support

Title	Genre(s)	Developer(s)	Publisher(s)	Release date			Addons	Ref.
Title	Genre(s)	Developer(s)	Publisher(s)	JP	NA	PAL	Addons	Ref.
.hack//G.U. Last Recode	Action role-playing	CyberConnect2	Bandai Namco Entertainment	Nov 3, 2017	Nov 1, 2017	Nov 3, 2017	P	
#BLUD	Adventure game; role-playing	Exit 73 Studios	Humble Bundle	Jun 18, 2024	Jun 18, 2024	Jun 18, 2024		
#Funtime	Shoot 'em up	OneGuyGames	Quantum Astrophysicists Guild	Unreleased	Jul 15, 2020	Jul 16, 2020		
#killallzombies	Shooter	Beatshapers	Beatshapers	Unreleased	Oct 28, 2014	Nov 12, 2014		
10 Second Ninja X	Platform	Four Circle Interactive	Curve Digital	Unreleased	Jul 19, 2016	Jul 19, 2016		
100ft Robot Golf	Sports	No Goblin	No Goblin	Unreleased	Oct 10, 2016	Oct 10, 2016	VR	
101 Ways to Die	Puzzle-platform	Four Door Lemon	Vision Games	Unreleased	Mar 22, 2016	Mar 22, 2016		
11-11: Memories Retold	Adventure	Aardman; DigixArt	Bandai Namco Entertainment	Nov 9, 2018	Nov 9, 2018	Nov 9, 2018		
13 Sentinels: Aegis Rim	Adventure; real-time strategy	Vanillaware	Atlus	Nov 28, 2019	Sep 22, 2020	Sep 22, 2020		
140	Platform	Double Fine Productions	Abstraction Games	Unreleased	Sep 1, 2016	Sep 1, 2016		
198X	Arcade	Hi-Bit Studios	Reset Media	Dec 14, 2020	Jun 16, 2019	Jun 20, 2019		
1001 Spikes	Platform	8bits Fanatics	Nicalis	Nov 27, 2015	Jun 3, 2014	Oct 7, 2015		
1979 Revolution: Black Friday	Adventure; interactive drama	iNK Stories	iNK Stories	Unreleased	Jul 31, 2018	Aug 1, 2018		
20 Bunnies	Action; Puzzle	EastAsiaSoft; Nerd Games	EastAsiaSoft	May 2, 2022	Nov 19, 2021	Nov 18, 2021		
2064: Read Only Memories	Graphic adventure	MidBoss	MidBoss	Jan 17, 2017	Jan 17, 2017	Jan 17, 2017		
20XX	Action; platform	Batterystaple Games	Batterystaple Games	Jul 10, 2018	Jul 10, 2018	Jul 10, 2018		
The 25th Ward: The Silver Case	Visual novel	Grasshopper Manufacture	NIS America	Mar 15, 2018	Mar 13, 2018	Mar 13, 2018		
2Dark	Horror; stealth	Gloomywood	Bigben Interactive	Jun 29, 2017	Mar 10, 2017	Mar 10, 2017		
2urvive	Action	2BAD GAMES	Tony DE LUCIA	Unreleased	Nov 16, 2021	Nov 15, 2021		
3 °C Sand Puzzle	Puzzle	COOL&WARM	Kemco	Feb 20, 2025	Feb 20, 2025	Feb 20, 2025		
39 Days to Mars	Action; puzzle	It's Anecdotal	It's Anecdotal	Oct 31, 2019	Oct 29, 2019	Oct 29, 2019		
3D Billiards	Sports	Z-Software	Joindots	Unreleased	Dec 19, 2017	Jan 5, 2018		
3D MiniGolf	Sports	Z-Software	Joindots	Unreleased	Aug 15, 2017	Jan 5, 2018		
3 Minutes to Midnight	Point and click adventure	Scarecrow Studio	Scarecrow Studio	Unreleased	TBA	TBA		
428: Shibuya Scramble	Visual novel	Abstraction Games	Spike Chunsoft	Sep 6, 2018	Sep 4, 2018	Sep 21, 2018		
5 Star Wrestling: ReGenesis	Sports	Serious Parody	Serious Parody	Unreleased	Jan 20, 2016	Jan 20, 2016		
60 Parsecs!	Action-adventure; strategy	Robot Gentleman	Robot Gentleman	Unreleased	Dec 18, 2020	Dec 18, 2020		
60 Seconds!	Action-adventure; strategy	Robot Gentleman	Robot Gentleman	Unreleased	Mar 6, 2020	Mar 6, 2020		
7 Days to Die	Survival horror	The Fun Pimps	Telltale Publishing	Unreleased	Jun 28, 2016	Jul 1, 2016		
7th Sector	Action-adventure	Noskov Sergey	Sometimes You	Unreleased	Feb 5, 2020	Feb 5, 2020		
8-bit Adventure Anthology: Volume I	Point-and-click adventure	Abstraction Games	Abstraction Games	Unreleased	Oct 31, 2017	Oct 31, 2017		
8-Bit Armies	Real-time strategy	Petroglyph Games	Soedesco	Aug 7, 2020	Sep 21, 2018	Sep 21, 2018		
8-Bit Hordes	Real-time strategy	Petroglyph Games	Soedesco	Aug 7, 2020	Feb 1, 2019	Feb 1, 2019		
8-Bit Invaders	Real-time strategy	Petroglyph Games	Soedesco	Aug 7, 2020	Feb 26, 2019	Feb 26, 2019		
88 Heroes	Platform	Bitmap Bureau	Rising Star Games	Mar 24, 2017	Mar 24, 2017	Mar 24, 2017		
8 to Glory	Sports	Three Gates	Three Gates	Unreleased	Jul 31, 2018	Sep 14, 2018		
9 Monkeys of Shaolin	Beat 'em up	Sobaka Studio	JP: Teyon; WW: Buka Entertainment	Oct 16, 2020	Oct 16, 2020	Oct 16, 2020		
9 -Nine-	Visual novel	Palette	Palette	Jun 23, 2022	Unreleased	Unreleased		
911 Operator	Platform	Jutsu Games	Code Horizon	Unreleased	Nov 8, 2017	Nov 8, 2017		
99Vidas	Beat 'em up	QuByte Interactive	QuByte Interactive	Unreleased	Jul 18, 2017	Dec 8, 2017	CP	
9th Dawn III	Action role-playing; dungeon crawl	Valorware	Valorware	Unreleased	Oct 6, 2020	Oct 6, 2020		
Aaero	Shooter	Mad Fellows Games	Reverb Triple XP	Apr 11, 2017	Jan 10, 2018	Apr 11, 2017		
Aaru's Awakening	Platform	Lumenox Games	Lumenox Games	Aug 5, 2015	Apr 7, 2015	Apr 8, 2015		
Abathor	Platformer; Hack and slash; Action	Pow Pixel Games	Jandusoft	Jun 18, 2025	Jul 25, 2024	Jul 25, 2024		
A Boy and His Blob	Platform; puzzle	Abstraction Games	Majesco	Unreleased	Jan 19, 2016	Jan 19, 2016		
Absolute Drift: Zen Edition	Racing	Funselektor Labs	Flippfly	Unreleased	Aug 23, 2016	Aug 16, 2016		
Absolver	Action role-playing	Sloclap	Devolver Digital	Aug 22, 2019	Aug 29, 2017	Aug 29, 2017	P	
Abyss Odyssey	Action	Ace Team	Sega	Unreleased	Jul 28, 2015	Jul 30, 2015		
Abyss: The Wraiths of Eden	Puzzle; hidden object	Artifex Mundi	Artifex Mundi	Unreleased	Oct 20, 2017	Oct 20, 2017		
Abzû	Adventure; art	Giant Squid	505 Games	Aug 2, 2016	Aug 2, 2016	Aug 2, 2016	P	
Accel World vs. Sword Art Online: Millennium Twilight	Action role-playing	Artdink	Bandai Namco Entertainment	Mar 16, 2017	Jul 7, 2017	Jul 7, 2017		
Accolade Sports Collection	Sports	QUByte Interactive	QUByte Interactive|Atari	Jan 30, 2025	Jan 30, 2025	Jan 30, 2025		
Ace Attorney Investigations Collection	Visual novel	Capcom	Capcom	Sep 6, 2024	Sep 6, 2024	Sep 6, 2024		
Ace Combat 7: Skies Unknown	Flight simulator	Project Aces	Bandai Namco Entertainment	Jan 18, 2019	Jan 18, 2019	Jan 18, 2019	VR	
Ace of Seafood	Action	Nussoft	Playism	Nov 11, 2017	Nov 9, 2017	Nov 9, 2017		
A Certain Magical Virtual-On	Action	Sega	Sega	Feb 15, 2018	Unreleased	Unreleased		
Aces of the Luftwaffe	Arcade	HandyGames	HandyGames	Unreleased	May 19, 2018	Feb 25, 2015		
Achtung! Cthulhu Tactics	Tactical role-playing	Auroch Digital	Ripstone	Unreleased	Nov 20, 2018	Nov 21, 2018	P	
Act It Out! A Game of Charades	Party	Snap Finger Click	Snap Finger Click	Unreleased	Jan 5, 2016	Jan 12, 2016		
Action Henk	Platform	RageSquid	NA: RageSquid; WW: Curve Digital	Mar 9, 2016	Mar 8, 2016	Mar 8, 2016		
Active Neurons	Puzzle	Nikolai Usachev	Sometimes You	Unreleased	Apr 29, 2020	Apr 29, 2020		
Adrift	Adventure	Three One Zero	505 Games	Unreleased	Jul 15, 2016	Jul 15, 2016		
The Adventure Pals	Adventure; role-playing	Massive Monster	Armor Games	Unreleased	Apr 3, 2018	Apr 3, 2018		
Adventures of Pip	Platform	Tic Toc Games	Tic Toc Games	Unreleased	Aug 18, 2015	Feb 9, 2016		
Adventures of Scarlet Curiosity	Action role-playing	Ankake Supa	Mediascape	Sep 27, 2016	Unreleased	Unreleased		
Adventure Time: Finn & Jake Investigations	Action-adventure	Vicious Cycle Software	Little Orbit	Unreleased	Oct 20, 2015	Nov 6, 2015		
Adventure Time: Pirates of the Enchiridion	Action-adventure	Climax Studios	Little Orbit	Unreleased	Jul 17, 2018	Jul 20, 2018		
Aegis Defenders	Action; strategy	Guts Department	Guts Department	Feb 8, 2018	Feb 8, 2018	Feb 8, 2018		
Aegis of Earth: Protonovus Assault	Tower defense	Acquire	Aksys Games	Aug 1, 2016	Mar 15, 2016	Apr 22, 2016		
Aeon Must Die!	Beat 'em up	Limestone Games	Focus Home Interactive	Oct 14, 2021	Oct 14, 2021	Oct 14, 2021		
AER: Memories of Old	Adventure	Forgotten Key	Daedalic Entertainment	Oct 25, 2017	Oct 25, 2017	Oct 25, 2017		
Aeterna Noctis	Metroidvania	Aeternum Game Studios	Aeternum Game Studios	Unreleased	Dec 15, 2021	Dec 15, 2021		
AeternoBlade	Action-adventure	Corecell Technology	PQube	Apr 26, 2016	Aug 4, 2015	Aug 5, 2015		
AeternoBlade II	Action-adventure	Corecell Technology	PQube	Unreleased	Oct 11, 2019	Oct 11, 2019		
AEW Fight Forever	Sports	Yuke's	THQ Nordic	Jun 29, 2023	Jun 29, 2023	Jun 29, 2023		
AFL 23	Sports	Big Ant Studios	Nacon	May 4, 2023	May 4, 2023	May 4, 2023		
AFL 26	Sports	Big Ant Studios	Nacon	May 8, 2025	May 8, 2025	May 8, 2025		
AFL Evolution	Sports	Wicked Witch Software	Tru Blu Entertainment	Unreleased	May 5, 2017	May 5, 2017		
AFL Evolution 2	Sports	Wicked Witch Software	Home Entertainment Suppliers	Unreleased	Apr 16, 2020	Apr 9, 2020		
A Fold Apart	Puzzle	Lightning Rod Games	Lightning Rod Games	Unreleased	May 19, 2020	May 19, 2020		
Afterparty	Adventure	Night School Studio	Night School Studio	Unreleased	Oct 29, 2019	Oct 29, 2019		
Agatha Christie – Hercule Poirot: The First Cases	Point-and-click adventure	Blazing Griffin	Microïds	Unreleased	Sep 28, 2021	Sep 28, 2021		
Agatha Christie: The ABC Murders	Point-and-click adventure	Artefacts Studio	Microïds	Apr 28, 2017	Feb 23, 2016	Feb 4, 2016		
Agent A: A Puzzle in Disguise	Adventure; puzzle	Yak	Yak	Unreleased	Aug 29, 2019	Aug 29, 2019		
Agents of Mayhem	Action, third-person	Volition	JP: Square Enix; WW: Deep Silver	Dec 7, 2017	Aug 15, 2017	Aug 18, 2017	P	
Age of Wonders: Planetfall	4X; turn-based strategy	Triumph Studios	Paradox Interactive	Unreleased	Aug 6, 2019	Aug 6, 2019	P	
Aggelos	Action role-playing	Storybird Games	JP: Arc System Works; WW: PQube	Jul 30, 2020	Jul 12, 2019	Jul 12, 2019		
Agony	Survival horror	Madmind Studio	PlayWay	Unreleased	May 29, 2018	May 29, 2018		
A Hat in Time	Platform	Gears for Breakfast	Gears for Breakfast	Unreleased	Dec 6, 2017	Dec 6, 2017		
A Healer Only Lives Twice	Dungeon crawl	Pon Pon Games	Platine Dispositif	Unreleased	Jul 25, 2017	Jul 25, 2017		
A Hole New World	Platform	Mad Gear Games	JP: EastAsiaSoft; WW: Hidden Trap	Oct 4, 2019	Oct 6, 2017	Oct 6, 2017		
AI: The Somnium Files	Adventure	Spike Chunsoft	Spike Chunsoft	Sep 19, 2019	Sep 17, 2019	Sep 20, 2019		
AI: The Somnium Files - Nirvana Initiative	Adventure	Spike Chunsoft	Spike Chunsoft	Jun 23, 2022	Jun 24, 2022	Jul 8, 2022		
Aikano: Yukizora no Triangle	Visual novel	Prekano	Entergram	Oct 29, 2020	Unreleased	Unreleased		
AIPD	Shoot 'em up	Blazing Badger	Blazing Badger	Unreleased	Jan 29, 2016	Jan 29, 2016		
Air Conflicts: Pacific Carriers	Flight simulator	Games Farm	Kalypso Media	Unreleased	Nov 3, 2015	Nov 6, 2015		
Air Conflicts: Vietnam	Flight simulator	Games Farm	bitComposer Interactive	Unreleased	Sep 16, 2014	Jun 27, 2014	3D	
Air Missions Hind	Flight simulator	Games Farm, S.R.O	Games Farm, S.R.O	Mar 21, 2016	Mar 21, 2016	Mar 21, 2016		
Air Twister	Rail shooter	YS Net	ININ Games	Nov 10, 2023	Nov 10, 2023	Nov 10, 2023		
Aircraft Evolution	Action	Satur Entertainment	Sometimes You	Unreleased	Jul 22, 2020	Jul 22, 2020		
Airport Simulator 2019	Simulation	Toplitz Productions	UIG Entertainment	Unreleased	Apr 9, 2019	Aug 15, 2018		
Airship Q	Action role-playing	Miracle Positive	Miracle Positive	Nov 19, 2015	Unreleased	Unreleased		
A Juggler's Tale	Platform; puzzle	Kaleidoscube	Mixtvision Games	Unreleased	Sep 29, 2021	Sep 29, 2021		
Akiba's Beat	Action role-playing	Acquire	JP: Acquire; NA: Xseed Games; EU: PQube	Dec 15, 2016	May 2, 2017	Mar 19, 2017	P	
Akiba's Trip: Hellbound & Debriefed	Action role-playing	Acquire	JP: Acquire; WW: Xseed Games	May 20, 2021	Jul 20, 2021	Jul 23, 2021		
Akiba's Trip: Undead & Undressed	Action role-playing	Acquire	JP: Acquire; NA: Xseed Games; EU: NIS America	Jul 3, 2014	Nov 25, 2014	Feb 13, 2015		
A King's Tale: Final Fantasy XV	Action	Empty Clip Studios	Square Enix	Mar 1, 2017	Mar 1, 2017	Mar 1, 2017		
Akita Oga Mystery Guide: The Frozen Silverbell Flower	Adventure	Happymeal	Flyhigh Works	Mar 18, 2021	Unreleased	Unreleased		
Alaloth: Champions of The Four Kingdoms	Action role-playing	Gamera	Gamera	Unreleased	TBA	TBA		
Alan Wake Remastered	Action-adventure	Remedy Entertainment	Epic Games Publishing	Oct 5, 2021	Oct 5, 2021	Oct 5, 2021		
Alba: A Wildlife Adventure	Adventure	Ustwo	Ustwo	Jul 21, 2021	Jun 9, 2021	Jun 9, 2021		
Alekhine's Gun	Action; stealth	Haggard Games	Maximum Games	Nov 10, 2015	Nov 1, 2015	Mar 11, 2016		
Aleste Collection	Shoot 'em up	M2	M2	Dec 24, 2020	Unreleased	Unreleased		
Alex Kidd in Miracle World DX	Platform	Merge Games; Jankenteam	Merge Games	Jun 24, 2021	Jun 24, 2021	Jun 24, 2021		
Alfred Hitchcock – Vertigo	Adventure	Pendulo Studios	Microids	Unreleased	Oct 4, 2022	Sep 27, 2022		
Alice Gear Aegis CS: Concerto of Simulatrix	Action	Pyramid	Mages	Sep 8, 2022	Mar 14, 2023	Mar 14, 2023		
Alienation	Shoot 'em up	Housemarque	Sony Interactive Entertainment	Jun 2, 2016	Apr 26, 2016	Apr 26, 2016		
Alien Hominid HD	Run and gun	The Behemoth	The Behemoth	Jun 10, 2025	Jun 10, 2025	Jun 10, 2025		
Alien Hominid Invasion	Run and gun	The Behemoth	The Behemoth	Jun 10, 2025	Jun 10, 2025	Jun 10, 2025		
Alien: Isolation	Survival horror	Creative Assembly	Sega	Jun 11, 2015	Oct 7, 2014	Oct 7, 2014	C	
Aliens: Dark Descent	Real-time tactics	Tindalos Interactive	Focus Entertainment	Jun 20, 2023	Jun 20, 2023	Jun 20, 2023		
Aliens: Fireteam Elite	Third-person shooter	Cold Iron Studios	Cold Iron Studios	Aug 24, 2021	Aug 24, 2021	Aug 24, 2021		
The Alliance Alive HD Remastered	Role-playing	Cattle Call	JP: FuRyu; WW: NIS America	Oct 10, 2019	Oct 8, 2019	Oct 11, 2019		
All-Star Fruit Racing	Racing	Blowfish Studios	Blowfish Studios	Jul 13, 2018	Jul 13, 2018	Jul 13, 2018		
Alone with You	Adventure	Benjamin Rivers	Benjamin Rivers	Unreleased	Aug 23, 2016	Aug 23, 2016		
The Alto Collection	Endless runner	Team Alto	Snowman	Unreleased	Aug 13, 2020	Aug 30, 2020	C	
Alwa's Awakening	Platform	Elden Pixels	Elden Pixels	Unreleased	Mar 21, 2019	Mar 21, 2019		
Alwa's Legacy	Platform	Elden Pixels	Elden Pixels	Unreleased	TBA	TBA		
Always Sometimes Monsters	Role-playing	Vagabond Dog	Devolver Digital	Unreleased	Oct 10, 2017	Oct 10, 2017		
The Amazing American Circus	Business simulation	Juggler Games	Klabater	Unreleased	May 20, 2021	May 20, 2021		
Amazing Discoveries in Outer Space	Platform	Cosmic Picnic	Cosmic Picnic	Unreleased	Feb 2, 2016	Feb 3, 2016		
The Amazing Spider-Man 2	Action-adventure	Beenox	Activision	Sep 4, 2014	Apr 29, 2014	May 2, 2014		
American Fugitive	Action; sandbox	JP: Teyon Japan; WW: Curve Digital	Fallen Tree Games	Jan 30, 2020	May 21, 2019	May 21, 2019		
Amnesia Collection	Adventure; survival horror	Frictional Games	Frictional Games	Unreleased	Nov 22, 2016	Nov 22, 2016	P	
Amnesia: Rebirth	Adventure; survival horror	Frictional Games	Frictional Games	Unreleased	Oct 20, 2020	Oct 20, 2020	P	
Amoeba Battle: Microscopic RTS Action	Real-time strategy	Grab Games	Grab Games	Unreleased	Mar 3, 2020	Mar 4, 2020		
Among the Sleep	Survival horror	Krillbite Studio	Krillbite Studio	Unreleased	Dec 10, 2015	Dec 10, 2015		
Among Us	Social deduction	Innersloth	Innersloth	Dec 14, 2021	Dec 14, 2021	Dec 14, 2021		
Amplitude	Music; rhythm	Harmonix	Harmonix	Unreleased	Jan 5, 2016	Jan 5, 2016		
Anarcute	Action	AnarTeam	AnarTeam	Feb 20, 2018	Unreleased	Unreleased		
Ancestors Legacy	Real-time strategy	Destructive Creations	JP: DMM Games; WW: Destructive Creations	Dec 19, 2019	Aug 13, 2019	Aug 13, 2019		
Ancestors: The Humankind Odyssey	Survival	Panache Digital Games	Private Division	Dec 6, 2019	Dec 6, 2019	Dec 6, 2019		
Anew: The Distant Light	Action; puzzle	Resonator	Resonator	Unreleased	TBA	TBA		
AngerForce: Reloaded	Shoot 'em up	Screambox Studio	Zodiac Interactive	Aug 8, 2019	Apr 2, 2019	Apr 2, 2019		
Angry Birds Star Wars	Puzzle	Exient Entertainment	Activision	Unreleased	Nov 15, 2013	Nov 29, 2013	C M	
The Angry Video Game Nerd I & II Deluxe	Platform	FreakZone Games	Screenwave Media	Unreleased	Mar 19, 2021	Mar 19, 2021		
Achilles: Legends Untold	Action role-playing	Dark Point Games	Dark Point Games	Unreleased	Sep 18, 2024	Sep 18, 2024		
Anima: Gate of Memories	Action role-playing	Anima Project	BadLand Games	Jan 1, 2017	Mar 21, 2017	Jun 3, 2016		
Anima: Gate of Memories - The Nameless Chronicles	Action role-playing	Anima Project	BadLand Games	Jun 29, 2018	Jun 29, 2018	Jun 29, 2018		
Anime Studio Story	Simulation	Kairosoft	Kairosoft	Nov 18, 2020	Nov 19, 2020	Nov 19, 2020		
Ankora: Lost Days	Adventure; survival	Chibig	Chibig	Mar 30, 2023	Mar 30, 2023	Mar 30, 2023		
Anno: Mutationem	Action role-playing	ThinkingStars	ThinkingStars	TBA	TBA	TBA		
Anodyne	Action-adventure	Analgesic Productions	Nnooo	Unreleased	Sep 18, 2018	Sep 19, 2018		
Anodyne 2: Return to Dust	Action-adventure	Analgesic Productions	Ratalatika Games	Feb 18, 2021	Feb 18, 2021	Feb 18, 2021		
Anoko wa Ore kara Hanarenai	Visual novel	Giga	Technical Group Laboratory	Dec 18, 2014	Unreleased	Unreleased		
Anomaly 2	Real-time strategy	11 Bit Studios	11 Bit Studios	Unreleased	Sep 16, 2014	Sep 17, 2014		
Anonymous;Code	Visual novel	Mages; Chiyomaru Studio	Mages	Jul 28, 2022	Sep 8, 2023	Sep 8, 2023		
Another World: 20th Anniversary Edition	Cinematic platformer	The Digital Lounge	The Digital Lounge	Unreleased	Jun 25, 2014	Jun 25, 2014		
Anthem	Action role-playing	BioWare	Electronic Arts	Feb 22, 2019	Feb 22, 2019	Feb 22, 2019	P	
Antiquia Lost	Role-playing	Exe Create	Kemco	Aug 16, 2017	Sep 5, 2017	Sep 5, 2017		
Aokana: Four Rhythm Across the Blue	Visual novel	Sprite	JP: Sprite; WW: PQube	Jan 26, 2017	TBA	TBA		
AO Tennis	Sports	Big Ant Studios	Big Ant Studios	Unreleased	May 8, 2018	Jan 16, 2018		
AO Tennis 2	Sports	Big Ant Studios	Big Ant Studios	May 14, 2018	Feb 11, 2020	Jan 9, 2020		
Apex Legends	Battle Royale; First-person hero shooter	Respawn Entertainment	Electronic Arts	Feb 4, 2019	Feb 4, 2019	Feb 4, 2019		
A Pixel Story	Platform, puzzle	Lamplight Studios	Rising Star Games	Unreleased	Feb 24, 2017	Feb 24, 2017		
A Plague Tale: Innocence	Action-adventure	Asobo Studio	JP: Oizumi Amuseo; WW: Focus Home Interactive	Nov 28, 2019	May 14, 2019	May 14, 2019	P	
Apocalypse	Action role-playing	Future Tech	Future Tech	Unreleased	TBA	TBA		
Apotheon	Action role-playing, platform	Alientrap	Alientrap	Unreleased	Feb 3, 2015	Feb 3, 2015		
Aqua Moto Racing Utopia	Racing	Zordix	Zordix	Unreleased	Nov 29, 2016	Nov 30, 2016		
The Aquatic Adventure of the Last Human	Metroidvania	Stage Clear Studios	Digerati	Unreleased	Jan 23, 2018	Jan 24, 2018		
Ara Fell: Enhanced Edition	Role-playing	Stegosoft	Dangen Entertainment	Mar 26, 2020	Mar 26, 2020	Mar 26, 2020		
Aragami	Action-adventure; stealth	Lince Works	Merge Games	Oct 4, 2016	Oct 4, 2016	Oct 4, 2016	CP	
Aragami 2	Action-adventure; stealth	Lince Works	Lince Works	Sep 17, 2021	Sep 17, 2021	Sep 17, 2021		
Arcade Archives: 10-Yard Fight	Sports	Irem	Hamster Corporation	May 2, 2018	Jun 14, 2018	Jun 22, 2018		
Arcade Archives: 64th Street	Beat 'em up	Jaleco	Hamster Corporation	Oct 29, 2020	Nov 7, 2020	Nov 7, 2020		
Arcade Archives: A-Jax	Scrolling shooter	Konami	Hamster Corporation	Mar 19, 2015	Sep 8, 2015	Oct 20, 2015		
Arcade Archives: Aero Fighters	Scrolling shooter	Video System	Hamster Corporation	Dec 14, 2023	Dec 14, 2023	Dec 14, 2023		
Arcade Archives: Air Combat 22	Air combat simulation	Namco	Hamster Corporation	Jul 3, 2025	Jul 3, 2025	Jul 3, 2025		
Arcade Archives: Alpha Mission	Scrolling shooter	SNK	Hamster Corporation	Oct 25, 2018	Jul 18, 2019	Unreleased		
Arcade Archives: Alpine Ski	Skiing	Taito	Hamster Corporation	May 30, 2019	May 30, 2019	Unreleased		
Arcade Archives: Aqua Jet	Racing	Namco	Hamster Corporation	Aug 14, 2025	Aug 14, 2025	Aug 14, 2025		
Arcade Archives: Arabian	Platform	Sunsoft	Hamster Corporation	Oct 8, 2020	Oct 15, 2020	Oct 15, 2020		
Arcade Archives: Argus	Scrolling shooter	Jaleco	Hamster Corporation	Aug 30, 2018	May 16, 2019	Unreleased		
Arcade Archives: Ark Area	Multidirectional shooter	UPL	Hamster Corporation	Jan 19, 2017	Unreleased	Unreleased		
Arcade Archives: Armed F	Shooter game	Nichibutsu	Hamster Corporation	May 27, 2016	May 27, 2016	Jan 31, 2017		
Arcade Archives: Assault	Multi-directional shooter	Namco	Hamster Corporation	Sep 29, 2022	Sep 29, 2022	Sep 29, 2022		
Arcade Archives: Assault Plus	Multi-directional shooter	Namco	Hamster Corporation	Apr 3, 2025	Apr 3, 2025	Apr 3, 2025		
Arcade Archives: The Astyanax	Platform	Jaleco	Hamster Corporation	May 6, 2021	May 6, 2021	May 6, 2021		
Arcade Archives: Athena	Platform	SNK	Hamster Corporation	Dec 13, 2018	Dec 19, 2018	Dec 19, 2019		
Arcade Archives: Atomic Robo-Kid	Scrolling shooter	UPL	Hamster Corporation	Sep 29, 2016	Unreleased	Unreleased		
Arcade Archives: Baraduke	Run and gun	Namco	Hamster Corporation	Nov 10, 2022	Nov 10, 2022	Nov 10, 2022		
Arcade Archives: Baraduke 2	Scrolling shooter	Namco	Hamster Corporation	Aug 3, 2023	Aug 3, 2023	Aug 3, 2023		
Arcade Archives: Battlantis	Fixed shooter	Konami	Hamster Corporation	Oct 9, 2025	Oct 9, 2025	Oct 9, 2025		
Arcade Archives: Ben Bero Beh	Platform	Taito	Hamster Corporation	Oct 1, 2020	Oct 8, 2020	Oct 8, 2020		
Arcade Archives: Bermuda Triangle	Scrolling shooter	SNK	Hamster Corporation	Dec 4, 2025	Dec 4, 2025	Dec 4, 2025		
Arcade Archives: Bio-ship Paladin	Scrolling shooter	UPL	Hamster Corporation	Aug 5, 2021	Aug 5, 2021	Aug 5, 2021		
Arcade Archives: Black Heart	Shooter	UPL	Hamster Corporation	Nov 4, 2021	Nov 4, 2021	Nov 4, 2021		
Arcade Archives: Blandia	Fighting	Allumer	Hamster Corporation	Oct 19, 2023	Oct 19, 2023	Oct 19, 2023		
Arcade Archives: Blast Off	Shooter	Namco	Hamster Corporation	Sep 26, 2024	Sep 26, 2024	Sep 26, 2024		
Arcade Archives: Bomb Bee	Block breaker	Namco	Hamster Corporation	Nov 20, 2025	Nov 20, 2025	Nov 20, 2025		
Arcade Archives: Bomb Jack	Platform	Tecmo	Hamster Corporation	Jun 19, 2014	Aug 18, 2015	Unreleased		
Arcade Archives: Bonze Adventure	Platform	Taito	Hamster Corporation	Mar 23, 2023	Mar 23, 2023	Mar 23, 2023		
Arcade Archives: Bosconian	Multidirectional shooter	Namco	Hamster Corporation	Aug 24, 2023	Aug 24, 2023	Aug 24, 2023		
Arcade Archives: Bravoman	Beat 'em up	Namco	Hamster Corporation	Jun 8, 2023	Jun 8, 2023	Jun 8, 2023		
Arcade Archives: Bubble Bobble	Platform	Taito	Hamster Corporation	Jan 29, 2016	Mar 15, 2016	Apr 1, 2016		
Arcade Archives: BurgerTime	Platform	Data East	Hamster Corporation	Jul 30, 2020	Aug 14, 2020	Aug 15, 2020		
Arcade Archives: Burnin' Rubber	Vehicular combat	Data East	Hamster Corporation	Sep 24, 2020	Unreleased	Unreleased		
Arcade Archives: Burning Force	Third-person shooter	Namco	Hamster Corporation	Oct 26, 2023	Oct 26, 2023	Oct 26, 2023		
Arcade Archives: Butasan	Action	Jaleco	Hamster Corporation	Mar 12, 2015	Jul 14, 2015	Oct 6, 2015		
Arcade Archives: Cadash	Action; Action role-playing	Taito	Hamster Corporation	Aug 31, 2023	Aug 31, 2023	Aug 31, 2023		
Arcade Archives: Castle of Dragon	Fighting	Athena	Hamster Corporation	Jan 2, 2025	Jan 2, 2025	Jan 2, 2025		
Arcade Archives: Chack'n Pop	Platform	Taito	Hamster Corporation	Jul 21, 2022	Jul 21, 2022	Jul 21, 2022		
Arcade Archives: Champion Wrestler	Action	Taito	Hamster Corporation	Sep 8, 2022	Sep 8, 2022	Sep 8, 2022		
Arcade Archives: Chopper I	Scrolling shooter	SNK	Hamster Corporation	Aug 21, 2025	Aug 21, 2025	Aug 21, 2025		
Arcade Archives: Circus Charlie	Action	Konami	Hamster Corporation	Aug 6, 2020	Aug 6, 2020	Aug 6, 2020		
Arcade Archives: City Bomber	Vehicular combat	Konami	Hamster Corporation	Dec 5, 2024	Dec 5, 2024	Dec 5, 2024		
Arcade Archives: City Connection	Platform	Jaleco	Hamster Corporation	Oct 2, 2014	May 5, 2015	Sep 8, 2015		
Arcade Archives: Contra	Run and gun	Konami	Hamster Corporation	Aug 10, 2016	Sep 27, 2016	Nov 15, 2016		
Arcade Archives: Cop 01	Action	Nichibutsu	Hamster Corporation	Jun 29, 2023	Jun 29, 2023	Jun 29, 2023		
Arcade Archives: Cosmo Gang the Puzzle	Puzzle	Namco	Hamster Corporation	Jan 11, 2024	Jan 11, 2024	Jan 11, 2024		
Arcade Archives: Cosmo Gang the Video	Fixed shooter	Namco	Hamster Corporation	Apr 20, 2023	Apr 20, 2023	Apr 20, 2023		
Arcade Archives: Cosmo Police Galivan	Platform	Nichibutsu	Hamster Corporation	Apr 9, 2015	Oct 20, 2015	Feb 9, 2016		
Arcade Archives: Cotton Fantastic Night Dreams	Scrolling shooter	Success	Hamster Corporation	Nov 28, 2024	Nov 28, 2024	Nov 28, 2024		
Arcade Archives: Crazy Balloon	Maze	Taito	Hamster Corporation	Jun 26, 2025	Jun 26, 2025	Jun 26, 2025		
Arcade Archives: Crazy Climber	Action	Nichibutsu	Hamster Corporation	May 15, 2014	May 26, 2015	Jun 19, 2015		
Arcade Archives: Crazy Climber 2	Action	Nichibutsu	Hamster Corporation	Feb 26, 2015	Oct 15, 2015	Jan 19, 2016		
Arcade Archives: Crime City	Action	Taito	Hamster Corporation	Sep 19, 2024	Sep 19, 2024	Sep 19, 2024		
Arcade Archives: Crime Fighters	Beat 'em up	Konami	Hamster Corporation	Mar 18, 2021	Mar 18, 2021	Mar 18, 2021		
Arcade Archives: Cue Brick	Puzzle	Konami	Hamster Corporation	May 30, 2024	May 30, 2024	May 30, 2024		
Arcade Archives: Cybattler	Shooter	Jaleco	Hamster Corporation	Feb 18, 2021	Feb 18, 2021	Feb 18, 2021		
Arcade Archives: Vendetta	Beat 'em up	Konami	Hamster Corporation	Jul 21, 2021	Jul 21, 2021	Jul 21, 2021		
Arcade Classics Anniversary Collection	Shoot 'em up	Konami	Konami	Jun 12, 2019	Apr 18, 2019	Apr 18, 2019		
Arcade Paradise	Adventure; Simulation	Nosebleed Interactive	Wired Productions	Aug 11, 2022	Aug 11, 2022	Aug 11, 2022		
Arcade Spirits	Visual novel	Fiction Factory Games	PQube	Unreleased	Mar 1, 2020	Mar 1, 2020		
Arcania: The Complete Tale	Action role-playing	Black Forest Games	Nordic Games	Unreleased	May 12, 2015	May 8, 2015		
Archaica: The Path of Light	Puzzle	TwoMammoths	Drageus Games	Unreleased	Apr 24, 2020	Apr 24, 2020		
Archetype Arcadia	Visual novel	Water Phoenix	Kemco	Oct 21, 2021	Unreleased	Unreleased		
Arc of Alchemist	Action role-playing	Compile Heart	Idea Factory	Feb 7, 2019	Jan 30, 2020	Jan 31, 2020		
Arietta of Spirits	Action-adventure	Third Spirits	Red Art Games	Oct 20, 2021	Aug 20, 2021	Aug 20, 2021		
Arise: A Simple Story	Adventure	Piccolo Studio	Techland Publishing	Jan 21, 2020	Dec 3, 2019	Dec 3, 2019		
Ark: Survival Evolved	Action, survival	Studio Wildcard	Studio Wildcard	Oct 26, 2017	Aug 29, 2017	Aug 29, 2017	P VR	
Armello	Board game, role-playing	League of Geeks	League of Geeks	Sep 2, 2015	Sep 1, 2015	Sep 1, 2015		
Ar Nosurge DX	Role-playing	Gust Co. Ltd.	Koei Tecmo	Mar 4, 2021	Unreleased	Unreleased		
Arslan: The Warriors of Legend	Action	Koei Tecmo	Koei Tecmo	Oct 1, 2015	Feb 9, 2016	Feb 12, 2016		
Art of Balance	Puzzle	Shin'en Multimedia	Shin'en Multimedia	Unreleased	Jun 3, 2016	Jun 3, 2016	M	
Art of Rally	Racing	Funselektor Labs	Funselektor Labs	Oct 6, 2021	Oct 6, 2021	Oct 6, 2021		
The Artful Escape	Platform	Beethoven & Dinosaur	Annapurna Interactive	Jan 25, 2022	Jan 25, 2022	Jan 25, 2022		
Ary and the Secret of Seasons	Action-adventure	Exiin	Modus Games	Sep 1, 2020	Sep 1, 2020	Sep 1, 2020	P	
Arzette: The Jewel of Faramore	Action-adventure; platformer	Seedy Eye Software	Limited Run Games	Unreleased	Feb 14, 2024	Feb 14, 2024		
As Dusk Falls	Adventure; interactive fiction	Interior Night	Interior Night	Mar 7, 2024	Mar 7, 2024	Mar 7, 2024		
Asatsugutori	Adventure	Nippon Ichi Software	Nippon Ichi Software	Nov 25, 2021	Unreleased	Unreleased		
The Ascent	Action role-playing	Neon Giant	Curve Digital	Mar 24, 2022	Mar 24, 2022	Mar 24, 2022		
Asdivine Dios	Role-playing	Exe Create	Kemco	Jun 5, 2019	Jul 2, 2019	Unreleased		
Asdivine Hearts	Role-playing	Kotobuki Solution	Kemco	Jan 10, 2017	Dec 13, 2016	Nov 7, 2017		
Asdivine Hearts II	Role-playing	Exe Create	Kemco	Jan 17, 2018	Jan 24, 2019	Unreleased		
Asdivine Kamura	Role-playing	Exe Create	Kemco	Oct 2, 2019	Nov 5, 2019	Unreleased		
Asdivine Menace	Role-playing	Exe Create	Kemco	Aug 2, 2019	Sep 3, 2019	Unreleased		
Asemblance	First-person adventure	Nilo Studios	Nilo Studios	Unreleased	Jun 21, 2016	Jul 26, 2016		
Asemblance: Oversight	First-person adventure	Nilo Studios	Nilo Studios	Unreleased	May 15, 2018	May 15, 2018		
Ashen	Action role-playing	A44	Annapurna Interactive	Feb 18, 2020	Dec 9, 2019	Dec 9, 2019	P	
Ashes Cricket	Sports	Big Ant Studios	Big Ant Studios	Unreleased	Nov 16, 2017	Nov 16, 2017	P	
A Space for the Unbound	Adventure	Mojiken Studio	Chorus Worldwide	Jan 19, 2023	Jan 19, 2023	Jan 19, 2023		
Assassin's Creed III Remastered	Action-adventure; stealth	Ubisoft Montreal	Ubisoft	Mar 29, 2019	Mar 29, 2019	Mar 29, 2019	P	
Assassin's Creed IV: Black Flag	Action-adventure; stealth	Ubisoft Montreal	Ubisoft	Feb 22, 2014	Nov 15, 2013	Nov 22, 2013		
Assassin's Creed Chronicles: China	Action-adventure; stealth	Climax Studios	Ubisoft	Apr 22, 2015	Apr 21, 2015	Apr 22, 2015		
Assassin's Creed Chronicles: India	Action-adventure; stealth	Climax Studios	Ubisoft	Jan 12, 2016	Jan 13, 2016	Jan 12, 2016		
Assassin's Creed Chronicles: Russia	Action-adventure; stealth	Climax Studios	Ubisoft	Feb 25, 2016	Feb 9, 2016	Feb 9, 2016		
Assassin's Creed: The Ezio Collection	Action-adventure; stealth	Virtuos	Ubisoft	Nov 15, 2016	Nov 15, 2016	Nov 15, 2016	P	
Assassin's Creed Odyssey	Action-adventure; stealth	Ubisoft Quebec	Ubisoft	Oct 5, 2018	Oct 5, 2018	Oct 5, 2018	P	
Assassin's Creed: Origins	Action-adventure; stealth	Ubisoft	Ubisoft	Oct 27, 2017	Oct 27, 2017	Oct 27, 2017	P	
Assassin's Creed Rogue Remastered	Action-adventure; stealth	Ubisoft Sofia	Ubisoft	Mar 20, 2018	Mar 20, 2018	Mar 20, 2018	P	
Assassin's Creed Syndicate	Action-adventure; stealth	Ubisoft Quebec	Ubisoft	Oct 23, 2015	Oct 23, 2015	Oct 23, 2015	P	
Assassin's Creed Unity	Action-adventure; stealth	Ubisoft Toronto	Ubisoft	Dec 4, 2014	Nov 11, 2014	Nov 13, 2014		
Assassin's Creed Valhalla	Action-adventure; stealth	Ubisoft Montreal	Ubisoft	Nov 10, 2020	Nov 10, 2020	Nov 10, 2020	CB P	
Assassin's Creed Mirage	Action-adventure; stealth	Ubisoft Bordeaux	Ubisoft	Oct 5, 2023	Oct 5, 2023	Oct 5, 2023		
Assault Android Cactus	Shoot 'em up	Witch Beam	Witch Beam	Mar 9, 2016	Mar 8, 2016	Mar 8, 2016		
Assault Suit Leynos	Shooter	Dracue Software	Extreme	Dec 23, 2015	Jul 12, 2016	Jul 14, 2016		
The Assembly	Adventure	nDreams	nDreams	Unreleased	Oct 13, 2016	Oct 13, 2016	P VR	
Assetto Corsa	Racing	Kunos Simulazioni	505 Games	Sep 27, 2018	Aug 30, 2016	Aug 26, 2016		
Assetto Corsa Competizione	Racing	Kunos Simulazioni	505 Games	Sep 24, 2020	Jun 23, 2020	Jun 23, 2020	P	
Astalon: Tears of the Earth	Action; platform	LABSworks	Dangen Entertainment	Unreleased	Jun 3, 2021	Jun 3, 2021		
Astebreed	Action; shoot 'em up	Edelweiss	JP: Playism; WW: AGM	Mar 19, 2015	Jun 25, 2015	Jun 25, 2015		
Asterigos: Curse of the Stars	Action role-playing	Acme Gamestudio	Acme Gamestudio	Oct 7, 2022	Oct 8, 2022	Jul 10, 2022		
Asterix & Obelix: Slap Them All!	Beat 'em up	Mr. Nutz Studio	Microids	Unreleased	Dec 2, 2021	Dec 2, 2021		
Asterix & Obelix XXL Romastered	Action-adventure	OSome Studio	Microids	Unreleased	Oct 22, 2020	Oct 22, 2020		
Asterix & Obelix XXL 2: Mission: Las Vegum	Action-adventure	OSome Studio	Anuman Interactive	Unreleased	Nov 29, 2018	Nov 29, 2018		
Asterix & Obelix XXL 3: The Crystal Menhir	Action-adventure	OSome Studio	Anuman Interactive	Unreleased	Nov 21, 2019	Nov 21, 2019		
Asterix & Obelix XXXL: The Ram From Hibernia	Action-adventure	OSome Studio	Microids	Unreleased	Nov 3, 2022	Oct 27, 2022		
Astria Ascending	Role-playing	Artisan Studios	Dear Villagers	Sep 30, 2021	Sep 30, 2021	Sep 30, 2021		
Astroneer	Adventure	System Era Softworks	System Era Softworks	Jan 12, 2022	Nov 15, 2019	Nov 15, 2019	P	
A Tale of Paper	Platform	Open House Games	Sony Interactive Entertainment	Unreleased	Oct 21, 2020	Oct 21, 2020		
Atari Flashback Classics: Volume 1	Arcade	Atari	Atari	Unreleased	Oct 13, 2016	Jan 18, 2017		
Atari Flashback Classics: Volume 2	Arcade	Atari	Atari	Unreleased	Oct 13, 2016	Jan 18, 2017		
Atari Flashback Classics: Volume 3	Arcade	Code Mystics	Atari	Unreleased	Mar 29, 2018	Sep 4, 2018		
Atelier Ayesha: The Alchemist of Dusk DX	Role-playing	Gust	Koei Tecmo	Dec 25, 2019	Jan 14, 2020	Jan 14, 2020		
Atelier Escha & Logy: Alchemists of the Dusk Sky DX	Role-playing	Gust	Koei Tecmo	Dec 25, 2019	Jan 14, 2020	Jan 14, 2020		
Atelier Firis: The Alchemist and the Mysterious Journey	Role-playing	Gust	Koei Tecmo	Nov 2, 2016	Mar 10, 2017	Mar 7, 2017	P	
Atelier Lulua: The Scion of Arland	Role-playing	Gust	Koei Tecmo	Mar 20, 2019	May 21, 2019	May 24, 2019	P	
Atelier Lydie & Suelle: Alchemists of the Mysterious Painting	Role-playing	Gust	Koei Tecmo	Dec 21, 2017	Mar 27, 2018	Mar 30, 2018	P	
Atelier Marie Remake: The Alchemist of Salburg	Role-playing	Gust	Koei Tecmo	Jul 13, 2023	Jul 13, 2023	Jul 13, 2023		
Atelier Meruru: The Apprentice of Arland	Role-playing	Gust	Koei Tecmo	Sep 20, 2018	Dec 4, 2018	Dec 4, 2018		
Atelier Rorona: The Alchemist of Arland	Role-playing	Gust	Koei Tecmo	Sep 20, 2018	Dec 4, 2018	Dec 4, 2018		
Atelier Ryza: Ever Darkness & the Secret Hideout	Role-playing	Gust	Koei Tecmo	Sep 26, 2019	Oct 29, 2019	Nov 1, 2019		
Atelier Ryza 2: Lost Legends & the Secret Fairy	Role-playing	Gust	Koei Tecmo	Dec 3, 2020	Jan 26, 2021	Jan 29, 2021	CB	
Atelier Ryza 3: Alchemist of the End & the Secret Key	Role-playing	Gust	Koei Tecmo	Mar 23, 2023	Mar 24, 2023	Mar 24, 2023	CB	
Atelier Shallie: Alchemists of the Dusk Sea DX	Role-playing	Gust	Koei Tecmo	Dec 25, 2019	Jan 14, 2020	Jan 14, 2020		
Atelier Sophie: The Alchemist of the Mysterious Book	Role-playing	Gust	Tecmo Koei	Nov 19, 2015	Jun 7, 2016	Jun 10, 2016		
Atelier Sophie 2: The Alchemist of the Mysterious Dream	Role-playing	Gust	Tecmo Koei	Feb 24, 2022	Feb 25, 2022	Feb 25, 2022		
Atelier Totori: The Adventurer of Arland	Role-playing	Gust	Koei Tecmo	Sep 20, 2018	Dec 4, 2018	Dec 4, 2018		
Atomfall	Action; survival	Rebellion Developments	Rebellion Developments	Mar 27, 2025	Mar 27, 2025	Mar 27, 2025		
Atomic Heart	Action role-playing; first-person shooter	Mundfish	Mundfish	Feb 23, 2023	Feb 23, 2023	Feb 23, 2023		
Atomicrops	Action	Bird Bath Games	Raw Fury	Sep 17, 2020	May 28, 2020	May 28, 2020		
A-Train Express	Simulation	Artdink	Degica Games	Dec 21, 2017	Jun 7, 2019	May 22, 2019	VR	
Attack on Titan	Action	Omega Force	Koei Tecmo	Feb 18, 2016	Aug 30, 2016	Aug 26, 2016		
Attack on Titan 2	Action	Omega Force	Koei Tecmo	Mar 15, 2018	Mar 20, 2018	Mar 20, 2018		
Attractio	First-person shooter; puzzle	GameCoder; Renderfarm	Bandai Namco Entertainment	Unreleased	Jan 19, 2016	Feb 17, 2016		
ATV Drift and Tricks	Racing	Artefacts Studio	Microïds	Jan 18, 2018	Oct 26, 2017	Oct 26, 2017		
Auto Chess	Auto battler; strategy	Drodo Studio; Dragonest	Dragonest	Dec 16, 2020	Dec 16, 2020	Dec 16, 2020		
Autumn's Journey	Action-adventure	Apple Cider	Ratalaika Games	Unreleased	Dec 8, 2020	Dec 9, 2020		
Aven Colony	Simulation	Mothership Entertainment	Team17	Unreleased	Jul 25, 2017	Jul 25, 2017		
Marvel's Avengers	Action-adventure	Crystal Dynamics; Eidos Montréal	Square Enix	Sep 4, 2020	Sep 4, 2020	Sep 4, 2020	CB P	
AVICII Invector	Music; rhythm	Hello There Games	Wired Productions	Oct 15, 2020	Dec 10, 2019	Dec 10, 2019		
Away: Journey to the Unexpected	Roguelike	Playdius Entertainment	Playdius Entertainment	Unreleased	Feb 5, 2019	Feb 5, 2019		
Away: The Survival Series	Action-adventure; survival	Breaking Walls	Breaking Walls	Sep 28, 2021	Sep 28, 2021	Sep 28, 2021		
A Way Out	Action-adventure	Hazelight Studios	Electronic Arts	Unreleased	Mar 23, 2018	Mar 23, 2018	P	
Awesomenauts Assemble	Battle arena	Abstraction Games	Ronimo Games	Unreleased	Mar 4, 2014	Mar 5, 2014		
Axiom Verge	Metroidvania	Thomas Happ Games	Thomas Happ Games	Mar 31, 2015	Mar 31, 2015	Mar 31, 2015		
Azkend 2: The World Beneath	Puzzle	10tons	10tons	Unreleased	May 3, 2016	May 4, 2016		
Azur Lane: Crosswave	Action, shooter	Felistella	JP: Compile Heart; WW: Idea Factory International	Aug 29, 2019	Feb 13, 2020	Feb 21, 2020		
Azure Reflections	Shoot 'em up	Souvenir Circ.	NA: Souvenir Circ.; WW: Sony Music Entertainment	Jan 25, 2018	May 15, 2018	May 15, 2018		
Azure Striker Gunvolt 3	Action	Inti Creates	Inti Creates	Dec 15, 2022	Dec 15, 2022	Dec 15, 2022		
Azure Striker Gunvolt: Striker Pack	Action	Inti Creates	Inti Creates	Apr 23, 2020	Apr 23, 2020	Apr 23, 2020		
Aztech: Forgotten Gods	Action-adventure	Lienzo	Lienzo	Unreleased	Mar 10, 2022	Mar 3, 2022		
Babylon's Fall	Action-adventure	PlatinumGames	Square Enix	Mar 3, 2022	Mar 3, 2022	Mar 3, 2022		
Backbone	Adventure	EggNut	Raw Fury	Unreleased	Jun 8, 2021	Jun 8, 2021		
Backgammon Blitz	Board game	VooFoo Studios	VooFoo Studios	Unreleased	Apr 15, 2014	Dec 18, 2013	CP	
Back to Bed	Puzzle	Loot Interactive	Loot Interactive	Feb 9, 2017	Aug 25, 2015	Aug 25, 2015		
Back to the Future: The Game – 30th Anniversary Edition	Adventure	Telltale Games	Telltale Games	Unreleased	Oct 13, 2015	Oct 16, 2015		
Badland: Game of the Year Edition	Platform	Frogmind	Frogmind	Jun 7, 2017	May 26, 2015	May 28, 2015		
Bad North	Real-time strategy	Plausible Concept	Raw Fury	Sep 6, 2018	Aug 28, 2018	Aug 28, 2018	P	
Baja: Edge of Control HD	Racing	2XL Games	THQ Nordic	Unreleased	Sep 14, 2017	Sep 14, 2017		
Bake 'n Switch	Party	Streamline Games	Streamline Games	Unreleased	TBA	TBA		
Balan Wonderworld	Platform	Balan Company	Square Enix	Mar 26, 2021	Mar 26, 2021	Mar 26, 2021	CB	
Balatro	Roguelike deck-building	LocalThunk	Playstack	Feb 20, 2024	Feb 20, 2024	Feb 20, 2024		
Baldo	Role-playing	NAPS team	NAPS team	Unreleased	Aug 27, 2021	Aug 27, 2021		
Baldur's Gate: Dark Alliance	Action role-playing	Black Isle Studios	Interplay Entertainment	Unreleased	May 7, 2021	May 7, 2021		
Baldur's Gate: Enhanced Edition	Role-playing	Beamdog	Skybound Games	Unreleased	Sep 24, 2019	Sep 27, 2019		
Baldur's Gate II: Enhanced Edition	Role-playing	Beamdog	Skybound Games	Unreleased	Sep 24, 2019	Sep 27, 2019		
Baldur's Gate: Siege of Dragonspear	Role-playing	Beamdog	Skybound Games	Unreleased	Sep 24, 2019	Sep 27, 2019		
Banner of the Maid	Turn-based strategy	Azure Flame Studio	CE-Asia	Unreleased	Aug 12, 2020	Aug 12, 2020		
The Banner Saga	Tactical role-playing	Stoic Studio	Versus Evil	Sep 1, 2016	Jan 12, 2016	Jan 12, 2016		
The Banner Saga 2	Tactical role-playing	Stoic Studio	Versus Evil	Nov 17, 2016	Jul 5, 2016	Jul 5, 2016		
The Banner Saga 3	Tactical role-playing	Stoic Studio	Versus Evil	Unreleased	Jul 26, 2018	Jul 26, 2018		
Bang-On Balls: Chronicles	Platform game, Adventure game, Indie game, Casual game, Fighting game, Early Access	Exit Plan Games	Untold Tales, CouchPlay Interactive	Mar 5, 2024	Mar 5, 2024	Mar 5, 2024		
Barbie Rewind	Platformer; action; sports	Digital Eclipse	Atari	Nov 12, 2026	Nov 12, 2026	Nov 12, 2026		
The Bard's Tale: Remastered and Resnarkled	Role-playing; dungeon crawler	InXile Entertainment	InXile Entertainment	Unreleased	Aug 17, 2017	Aug 22, 2017		
The Bard's Tale IV: Director's Cut	Dungeon crawler	InXile Entertainment	Deep Silver	Unreleased	Aug 27, 2019	Aug 27, 2019		
A Bastard's Tale	Action	No Pest Productions	No Pest Productions	Unreleased	Oct 4, 2016	Oct 5, 2016		
Bastion	Role-playing	Supergiant Games	WB Games	Unreleased	Apr 7, 2015	Apr 8, 2015		
Basement Crawl	Action, strategy	Bloober Team	Bloober Team	Unreleased	Feb 25, 2014	Feb 26, 2014		
Batman: Arkham Knight	Action-adventure	Rocksteady Studios	WB Games	Jul 2, 2015	Jun 23, 2015	Jun 23, 2015		
Batman: Return to Arkham	Action-adventure	Rocksteady Studios	WB Games	Feb 23, 2017	Oct 18, 2016	Oct 18, 2016	P	
Batman: The Enemy Within	Graphic adventure	Telltale Games	Telltale Games	Unreleased	Aug 8, 2017	Aug 8, 2017		
Batman: The Telltale Series	Graphic adventure	Telltale Games	Telltale Games	Unreleased	Aug 2, 2016	Aug 2, 2016		
Battle Chasers: Nightwar	Role-playing	Airship Syndicate	THQ Nordic	Jun 6, 2018	Oct 3, 2017	Oct 3, 2017		
Battlefield 1	First-person shooter	EA DICE	Electronic Arts	Oct 21, 2016	Oct 21, 2016	Oct 21, 2016	P	
Battlefield 2042	First-person shooter	EA DICE	Electronic Arts	Nov 19, 2021	Nov 19, 2021	Nov 19, 2021	P	
Battlefield 4	First-person shooter	EA DICE	Electronic Arts	Feb 22, 2014	Nov 15, 2013	Nov 29, 2013		
Battlefield V	First-person shooter	EA DICE	Electronic Arts	Oct 19, 2018	Oct 19, 2018	Oct 19, 2018	P	
Battlefield Hardline	First-person shooter	Visceral Games	Electronic Arts	Mar 19, 2015	Mar 17, 2015	Mar 19, 2015		
Battlestar Galactica Deadlock	Turn-based strategy	Black Lab Games	Slitherine Software	Unreleased	Dec 8, 2017	Dec 8, 2017		
Battle Garegga Rev.2016	Shoot 'em up	M2	M2	Dec 12, 2016	Oct 6, 2016	Jan 19, 2017		
Battle of the Bulge	Strategy	Slitherine Software	Slitherine Software	Unreleased	Nov 22, 2017	Nov 22, 2017		
Battle Princess Madelyn	Platform	Causal Bit Games	Causal Bit Games	Unreleased	Dec 20, 2018	Oct 18, 2019		
Battleship	Strategy	Frima Studio	Ubisoft	Unreleased	Aug 16, 2016	Aug 12, 2016		
Battle Spirits: Collected Battlers	Card battle	FuRyu	FuRyu	Jan 20, 2022	Unreleased	Unreleased		
Battlestar Galactica: Deadlock	Strategy	Black Lab Games	Slitherine Software	Unreleased	Dec 8, 2017	Dec 8, 2017		
Battle Worlds: Kronos	Turn-based strategy	King Art Games	Nordic Games	Unreleased	Apr 26, 2016	Apr 26, 2016		
Battlezone	Vehicular combat	Rebellion Developments	Rebellion Developments	Oct 13, 2016	Oct 13, 2016	Oct 13, 2016	P VR	
Batu Ta Batu	Puzzle	EZSD, 2Awesome Partners	2Awesome Partners	Sep 1, 2020	Sep 1, 2020	Sep 1, 2020	P	
Bayonetta	Action, hack and slash	PlatinumGames	Sega	May 28, 2020	Feb 18, 2020	Feb 18, 2020	P	
Bears Can't Drift!?	Racing	Strangely Named	Strangely Named	Unreleased	Aug 30, 2016	Aug 9, 2016		
Bear With Me: The Lost Robots	Adventure	Exordium Games	Modus Games	Jul 31, 2019	Jul 31, 2019	Jul 31, 2019		
Beast Quest	Role-playing	Torus Games	Maximum Games	Unreleased	Mar 13, 2018	Mar 16, 2018		
Beautiful Desolation	Adventure	The Brotherhood	Untold Tales	Oct 23, 2022	May 28, 2021	May 28, 2021		
Bedlam	First-person shooter	RedBedlam	Standfast Interactive	Unreleased	Oct 13, 2015	Oct 14, 2015		
Bee Simulator	Simulation	Varsav Game Studios	Bigben Interactive	Apr 23, 2020	Nov 12, 2019	Nov 12, 2019		
Behind the Frame: The Finest Scenery	Adventure	Silver Lining Studio	Akupara Games; Akatsuki Taiwan	Jun 2, 2022	Jun 2, 2022	Jun 2, 2022		
Beholder: Complete Edition	Strategy; management	Warm Lamp Games; Alawar	Curve Digital	Unreleased	Jan 16, 2018	Jan 16, 2018		
Beholder 2	Strategy; management	Warm Lamp Games; Alawar	Curve Digital	Unreleased	Oct 22, 2019	Oct 22, 2019		
Below	Action-adventure	Capybara Games	Capybara Games	Apr 7, 2020	Apr 7, 2020	Apr 7, 2020		
Ben 10	Action-adventure	Outright Games	Bandai Namco Entertainment	Unreleased	Nov 14, 2017	Nov 10, 2017		
Ben 10: Power Trip	Action-adventure	Outright Games	Bandai Namco Entertainment	Unreleased	Oct 9, 2020	Oct 9, 2020		
Bendy and the Ink Machine	Survival horror	Joey Drew Studios	Rooster Teeth Games	Unreleased	Nov 20, 2018	Nov 20, 2018		
Berserk and the Band of the Hawk	Action role-playing; hack and slash	Omega Force	Koei Tecmo	Oct 27, 2016	Feb 21, 2017	Feb 24, 2017	P	
Betty Bat's Treasure Hunt	Action	Bionic Pony	Bionic Pony	Unreleased	Dec 3, 2018	Unreleased		
Beyond a Steel Sky	Point-and-click adventure	Revolution Software	Microids	Nov 30, 2021	Nov 30, 2021	Nov 30, 2021		
Beyond Blue	Educational; adventure	E-Line Media	E-Line Media	Jun 16, 2020	Jun 11, 2020	Jun 11, 2020		
Beyond Contact	Survival	Playcorp Studios	Deep Silver	TBA	TBA	TBA		
Beyond Eyes	Adventure	Tiger and Squid	Team17	Unreleased	Sep 8, 2015	Sep 8, 2015		
Beyond Galaxyland	Role Playing game; Adventure	United Label	Sam Enright	Sep 24, 2024	Sep 24, 2024	Sep 24, 2024		
Beyond: Two Souls	Interactive drama	Quantic Dream	Sony Computer Entertainment	Jun 1, 2016	Nov 24, 2015	Nov 26, 2015		
Big Bash Boom	Sports	Big Ant Studios	Big Ant Studios	Unreleased	Nov 29, 2018	Nov 29, 2018		
Big Pharma	Management simulation	Twice Circled	Klabater	Unreleased	Dec 5, 2019	Dec 5, 2019		
Big Rumble Boxing: Creed Champions	Sports	Survios	Survios	Unreleased	Sep 3, 2021	Sep 3, 2021		
Binaries	Platform; puzzle	Ant Workshop	Ground Shatter	Unreleased	Aug 30, 2016	Aug 30, 2016		
The Binding of Isaac: Rebirth	Action-adventure; roguelike	Nicalis	Nicalis	Oct 28, 2015	Nov 4, 2014	Nov 5, 2014		
The Binding of Isaac: Repentance	Action-adventure; roguelike	Nicalis	Nicalis	Nov 4, 2021	Nov 4, 2021	Nov 4, 2021		
Biomutant	Action role-playing	Experiment 101	THQ Nordic	Unreleased	May 25, 2021	May 25, 2021		
BioShock: The Collection	First-person shooter	Blind Squirrel Games	2K Games	Sep 15, 2016	Sep 13, 2016	Sep 16, 2016	P	
Biped	Puzzle-platform	Next Studios	Meta Publishing	Apr 8, 2020	Apr 8, 2020	Apr 8, 2020		
Birthday of Midnight	Puzzle-platform	Petite Games	Ratalaika Games	Oct 1, 2020	Sep 29, 2020	Sep 30, 2020		
Birthdays the Beginning	Strategy	Toybox Games	NIS America	Jan 19, 2017	May 9, 2017	May 12, 2017	P	
Bit.Trip	Action	Choice Provisions	Choice Provisions	Unreleased	Dec 5, 2015	Dec 5, 2015		
Black & White Bushido	Brawler; stealth	Endemol	Endemol	Unreleased	May 17, 2017	May 17, 2017		
Black Book	Adventure; role-playing	Morteshka	HypeTrain Digital	Unreleased	Aug 10, 2021	Aug 10, 2021		
Black Desert	Massively multiplayer online role-playing	Pearl Abyss	Pearl Abyss	Aug 23, 2019	Aug 22, 2019	Aug 22, 2019	CP P	
Blackguards 2	Turn-based tactics	Daedalic	Kalypso Media	Nov 17, 2017	Sep 19, 2017	Sep 15, 2017		
Blackhole: Complete Edition	Platform; puzzle	FiolaSoft Studio	FiolaSoft Studio	Unreleased	Aug 8, 2017	Aug 8, 2017		
The Blackout Club	Horror	Question	Question	Unreleased	Jul 30, 2019	Jul 30, 2019		
Black Legend	Role-playing; turn-based strategy	Warcave	Warcave	Unreleased	Mar 25, 2021	Mar 25, 2021		
Black Paradox	Shoot 'em up	Fantastico Studio	Digerati	Unreleased	Apr 30, 2019	May 1, 2019		
Blacksad: Under the Skin	Adventure	Pendulo Studios; Ys Interactive	Microïds	Unreleased	Nov 14, 2019	Nov 14, 2019		
Blacksea Odyssey	Shoot 'em up	Spiral Summit Games	Digerati Distribution	Unreleased	Jul 17, 2018	Jul 11, 2018		
Black the Fall	Puzzle-platform	Sand Sailor Studio	Square Enix	Unreleased	Jul 11, 2017	Jul 11, 2017		
Blackwood Crossing	Adventure	PaperSeven	PaperSeven	Unreleased	Apr 4, 2017	Apr 4, 2017		
Blade Arcus from Shining EX	Fighting	Sega	Sega	Nov 26, 2015	Unreleased	Unreleased		
Blade Assault	Action-platform; roguelike	TeamSuneat	Neowiz	TBA	TBA	TBA		
Blade Ballet	Action; battle	DreamSail Games	DreamSail Games	Unreleased	Aug 9, 2016	Unreleased		
Bladed Fury	Action; side-scrolling	NExT Studios	PM Studios	Unreleased	Jan 22, 2021	Jan 22, 2021		
Blade Runner: Enhanced Edition	Point-and-click adventure	Alcon Entertainment	Nightdive Studios	Jun 23, 2022	Jun 23, 2022	Jun 23, 2022		
Blade Strangers	Fighting	Studio Saizensen	Nicalis	Aug 30, 2018	Aug 28, 2018	Aug 28, 2018		
Bladestorm: Nightmare	Real-time tactics	Koei Tecmo	Koei Tecmo	Jan 29, 2015	Mar 17, 2015	Mar 20, 2015		
Blair Witch	Survival horror	Bloober Team	Lionsgate Games	Jul 9, 2020	Dec 3, 2019	Dec 3, 2019	P	
Blasphemous	Platform	The Game Kitchen	Team17	Dec 19, 2019	Sep 10, 2019	Sep 10, 2019		
Blast 'Em Bunnies	Shooter	Nnooo	Nnooo	Nov 24, 2017	Mar 8, 2016	Mar 9, 2016		
Blaster Master Zero	Action; metroidvania	Inti Creates	Inti Creates	Jun 29, 2020	Jun 29, 2020	Jun 29, 2020		
Blaster Master Zero 2	Action; metroidvania	Inti Creates	Inti Creates	Jun 29, 2020	Jun 29, 2020	Jun 29, 2020		
Blaster Master Zero 3	Action; metroidvania	Inti Creates	Inti Creates	Jul 29, 2021	Jul 29, 2021	Jul 29, 2021		
Blaster Master Zero Trilogy: MetaFight Chronicle	Action; metroidvania	Inti Creates	Inti Creates	Jul 29, 2021	Unreleased	Unreleased		
Blast Zone! Tournament	Action; maze	Victory Lap Games	Victory Lap Games	Unreleased	Feb 28, 2019	Feb 28, 2019	P	
BlazBlue: Central Fiction	Fighting	Arc System Works	Aksys Games	Oct 6, 2016	Nov 1, 2016	Nov 4, 2016	P	
BlazBlue: Chrono Phantasma Extend	Fighting	Arc System Works	Aksys Games	Apr 23, 2015	Jun 30, 2015	Oct 23, 2015	CP	
BlazBlue: Cross Tag Battle	Fighting	Arc System Works	Arc System Works	May 31, 2018	Jun 5, 2018	Jun 5, 2018		
Blazerush	Vehicular combat	Targem Games	Targem Games	Unreleased	Dec 16, 2015	Dec 15, 2015		
Blazing Beaks	Twin-stick shooter	Applava	QubicGames	Unreleased	TBA	TBA		
Blazing Chrome	Run and gun; shooter	JoyMasher	The Arcade Crew	Jul 12, 2019	Jul 12, 2019	Jul 11, 2019		
Blazing Strike	Fighting	RareBreed Makes Games	Aksys Games	TBA	TBA	TBA		
Bleach: Rebirth of Souls	Fighting; Action	Tamsoft	Bandai Namco Entertainment	Mar 21, 2025	Mar 21, 2025	Mar 21, 2025		
Bleed	Platform	Bootdisk Revolution	Digerati	Unreleased	Aug 22, 2017	Aug 23, 2017		
Bleed 2	Platform	Bootdisk Revolution	Digerati	Unreleased	Feb 6, 2018	Feb 6, 2018		
Blind Fate: Edo no Yami	Action; platform	Troglobytes Games	101XP	Unreleased	TBA	TBA		
Block-a-Pix Deluxe	Nonogram; puzzle	Lightwood Games	Lightwood Games	Unreleased	Mar 26, 2019	Mar 26, 2019		
Bloodborne	Action role-playing	FromSoftware	Sony Computer Entertainment	Mar 26, 2015	Mar 24, 2015	Mar 25, 2015		
Blood Bowl 2	Sports; turn-based strategy	Cyanide	Focus Home Interactive	Unreleased	Sep 22, 2015	Sep 22, 2015		
Blood Bowl 3	Sports; turn-based strategy	Cyanide	Nacon	Unreleased	Feb 23, 2023	Feb 23, 2023		
Bloodroots	Action	Paper Cult	Paper Cult	Unreleased	Feb 28, 2020	Feb 28, 2020		
Bloodstained: Curse of the Moon	Action; platform	Inti Creates	Inti Creates	May 24, 2018	May 24, 2018	May 24, 2018		
Bloodstained: Curse of the Moon 2	Action; platform	ArtPlay; Inti Creates	505 Games	Jul 10, 2020	Jul 10, 2020	Jul 10, 2020		
Bloodstained: Ritual of the Night	Metroidvania	Inti Creates	505 Games	Oct 24, 2019	Jun 18, 2019	Jun 18, 2019		
Bloody Zombies	Brawler	Paw Print Games	nDreams	Unreleased	Sep 12, 2017	Sep 12, 2017	CP VR	
Bloons TD 5	Strategy, puzzle	Ninja Kiwi	Ninja Kiwi	Unreleased	May 9, 2017	May 9, 2017		
Blue Estate	First-person shooter	Hesaw	Focus Home Interactive	Unreleased	Jun 24, 2014	Jun 24, 2014		
Blue Fire	Action; platform	Robi Studios	Graffiti Games	Unreleased	Jul 23, 2021	Jul 23, 2021		
Blue Reflection	Role-playing	Gust Co. Ltd.	Koei Tecmo	Mar 30, 2017	Sep 26, 2017	Sep 29, 2017		
Blue Reflection: Second Light	Role-playing	Gust Co. Ltd.	Koei Tecmo	Oct 21, 2021	Nov 9, 2021	Nov 9, 2021		
Blue Rider	Shooter	Ravegan	Ravegan	Mar 10, 2017	Jul 26, 2016	Sep 9, 2016		
Blues and Bullets	Action-adventure	A Crowd of Monsters	A Crowd of Monsters	Unreleased	Apr 20, 2016	Apr 20, 2016		
Boiling Bolt	Shoot 'em up	Persistant Studios	Playdius Entertainment	Unreleased	Dec 5, 2017	Dec 5, 2017		
Bokosuka Wars II	Strategy	Pygmy Studio	Pygmy Studio	Nov 10, 2016	Oct 17, 2017	Oct 20, 2017		
Bokuhime Project	Adventure	Wizard Soft	Nippon Ichi Software	Apr 23, 2020	Unreleased	Unreleased		
Bomber Crew	Real-time strategy	Runner Duck	Curve Digital	Unreleased	Jul 10, 2018	Jul 10, 2018		
Book of Demons	Hack and slash	Thing Trunk	505 Games	May 21, 2020	Apr 30, 2020	Apr 30, 2020		
The Book of Unwritten Tales 2	Adventure	King Art Games	505 Games	Unreleased	Sep 18, 2015	Sep 18, 2015		
Borderlands 3	Action role-playing, first-person shooter	Gearbox Software	2K Games	Sep 13, 2019	Sep 13, 2019	Sep 13, 2019	CB P	
Borderlands: Game of the Year Edition	Action role-playing, first-person shooter	Gearbox Software	2K Games	Apr 3, 2019	Apr 3, 2019	Apr 3, 2019	P	
Borderlands: The Handsome Collection	Action role-playing, first-person shooter	Gearbox Software	2K Games	May 14, 2015	Mar 24, 2015	Mar 27, 2015	P	
Bound	3D platform, art	Plastic	Sony Interactive Entertainment	Aug 16, 2016	Aug 16, 2016	Aug 16, 2016	3D P VR	
Boundary	Tactical shooter	Surgical Scalpels	Surgical Scalpels	Unreleased	TBA	TBA	VR	
Bound by Flame	Action role-playing	Spiders	Focus Home Interactive	Unreleased	May 6, 2014	May 7, 2014		
Boundless	Sandbox	Wonderstruck Games	Wonderstruck Games	Unreleased	Sep 11, 2018	Sep 11, 2018	CP	
Bounty Battle	Fighting	Dark Screen Games	Merge Games	Sep 10, 2020	Sep 10, 2020	Sep 10, 2020		
Bow to Blood: Last Captain Standing	Action-adventure	Tribetoy	Tribetoy	Unreleased	Aug 28, 2018	Aug 28, 2018	P VR	
BPM: Bullets Per Minute	First-person shooter; roguelike	Awe Interactive	Awe Interactive	Unreleased	Oct 5, 2021	Oct 5, 2021		
BQM: BlockQuest Maker	Role-playing	Wonderland Kazakiri	Wonderland Kazakiri	Jul 4, 2019	Unreleased	Unreleased		
Braid Anniversary Edition	Puzzle; platform	Thekla	Thekla	TBA	TBA	TBA		
Bratz: Flaunt Your Fashion	Adventure; action	Petoons Studio	Outright Games	Nov 4, 2022	Nov 4, 2022	Nov 4, 2022		
Braveland Trilogy	Role-playing	Ellada Games	Ellada Games	Unreleased	Apr 9, 2020	Apr 9, 2020		
Brawl	Action; party	Bloober Team	Bloober Team	Unreleased	Apr 24, 2015	Apr 28, 2015		
Brawlout	Fighting	Angry Mob Games	Angry Mob Games	Aug 23, 2018	Aug 21, 2018	Aug 21, 2018		
Breakers Collection	Fighting	Visco Corporation	QuByte Interactive	Unreleased	Jan 12, 2023	Jan 12, 2023		
Breakneck City	Beat 'em up	Eastasiasoft	Eastasiasoft	Unreleased	Jan 22, 2022	Jan 22, 2022		
Breakout: Recharged	Puzzle	Adamvision Studios; SneakyBox	Atari, Inc.	Unreleased	Feb 10, 2022	Feb 10, 2022		
Breakthrough Gaming Arcade: Baseball	Arcade	Breakthrough Gaming	Breakthrough Gaming	Unreleased	Mar 28, 2021	May 23, 2021		
Breakthrough Gaming Arcade: Football	Arcade	Breakthrough Gaming	Breakthrough Gaming	Unreleased	Apr 4, 2021	Jun 13, 2021		
Breakthrough Gaming Arcade: Skateboarding	Arcade	Breakthrough Gaming	Breakthrough Gaming	Unreleased	Feb 16, 2021	Jun 27, 2021		
Breakthrough Gaming Arcade: Track	Arcade	Breakthrough Gaming	Breakthrough Gaming	Unreleased	Jun 6, 2021	Jun 6, 2021		
The Bridge	Puzzle	TQAG	TQAG	Unreleased	Aug 18, 2015	Aug 18, 2015		
Bridge Constructor	Puzzle; simulation	ClockStone	Headup Games	Jun 16, 2017	Dec 13, 2016	Dec 14, 2016		
Bridge Constructor Portal	Puzzle; simulation	ClockStone	Headup Games	Feb 28, 2018	Feb 28, 2018	Feb 28, 2018		
Bridge Constructor Stunts	Puzzle; simulation	ClockStone	Headup Games	Unreleased	Mar 27, 2018	Mar 27, 2018		
Bridge Constructor: The Walking Dead	Puzzle; simulation	Headup Games	Headup Games	Unreleased	Nov 19, 2020	Nov 19, 2020	CB	
Brief Battles	Party brawler	Juicy Cupcake	Juicy Cupcake	Unreleased	May 7, 2019	May 7, 2019	P	
Brigandine: The Legend of Runersia	Tactical role-playing	Matrix Software	Happinet	Dec 10, 2020	Dec 10, 2020	Dec 10, 2020		
Broforce	Platform, run and gun	Free Lives	Devolver Digital	Mar 2, 2016	Mar 1, 2016	Mar 1, 2016		
Broken Age: The Complete Adventure	Point-and-click adventure	Double Fine Productions	Double Fine Productions	Unreleased	Apr 28, 2015	Apr 29, 2015		
Broken Delusion	Action role-playing	Bilibili	Zhaijidian	TBA	TBA	TBA		
Broken Sword 5: The Serpent's Curse	Point-and-click adventure	Revolution Software	Revolution Software	Apr 26, 2019	Sep 4, 2015	Sep 4, 2015		
Brothers: A Tale of Two Sons	Puzzle, adventure	Starbreeze Studios	505 Games	Unreleased	Aug 12, 2015	Aug 12, 2015		
Brutal	Action role-playing	Stormcloud Games	Stormcloud Games	Oct 20, 2016	Aug 9, 2016	Aug 9, 2016		
Bubble Bobble 4 Friends: The Baron is Back	Platform	Taito	Inin Games	Nov 19, 2020	Nov 17, 2020	Nov 17, 2020		
Bubsy: Paws on Fire!	Platform	Choice Provisions	UFO Interactive Games	Unreleased	May 16, 2019	May 16, 2019		
Bubsy: The Woolies Strike Back	Platform	Black Forest Games	UFO Interactive Games	Unreleased	Oct 31, 2017	Oct 31, 2017		
Bucket Knight	Platform	Sometimes You	Sometimes You	Feb 20, 2020	Feb 20, 2020	Feb 20, 2020		
Bud Spencer & Terence Hill: Slaps and Beans	Beat 'em up	Trinity Team	Buddy Productions	Unreleased	Jul 24, 2018	Jul 24, 2018		
The Bug Butcher	Action	Awfully Nice Studios	Triangle Studios	Unreleased	Oct 18, 2016	Oct 18, 2016		
Bug Fables: The Everlasting Sapling	Role-playing	Moonsprout Games	Dangen Entertainment	May 28, 2020	May 28, 2020	May 28, 2020		
BugsBox	Action; puzzle	Park ESM	Park ESM	May 16, 2017	May 25, 2017	Jun 5, 2017		
Bugsnax	Adventure; platform	Young Horses	Young Horses	Nov 11, 2020	Nov 12, 2020	Nov 12, 2020	CB	
Buildings Have Feelings Too!	Simulation, strategy	Blackstaff Games	Merge Games	Unreleased	TBA	TBA		
Bulb Boy	Adventure	Bulbware	Bulbware	Unreleased	Mar 1, 2018	Mar 1, 2018		
Bulletstorm: Full Clip Edition	First-person shooter	People Can Fly	Gearbox Software	Apr 7, 2017	Apr 7, 2017	Apr 7, 2017	P	
Bulwark Evolution: Falconeer Chronicles	City-building	Tomas Sala	Wired Productions	Apr 2, 2024	Mar 26, 2024	Mar 26, 2024		
Buried Stars	Visual novel	Studio Largo	Line Games	Jul 30, 2020	Jul 30, 2020	Jul 30, 2020		
Burnout Paradise Remastered	Racing	Stellar Entertainment	Electronic Arts	Mar 15, 2018	Mar 16, 2018	Mar 16, 2018	P	
Bus Driver Simulator	Vehicle simulation	Ultimate Games	UIH	Sep 30, 2021	Nov 3, 2020	Nov 3, 2020		
Bus Simulator 18	Vehicle simulation	Stillalive Studios	Astragon	Sep 18, 2019	Sep 17, 2019	Sep 17, 2019		
Bus Simulator 21	Vehicle simulation	Stillalive Studios	Astragon	Sep 7, 2021	Sep 7, 2021	Sep 7, 2021		
Bush Hockey League	Sports	V7 Entertainment	V7 Entertainment	Unreleased	Mar 28, 2017	Mar 28, 2017		
Butcher	Shooter	Transhuman Design	Crunching Koalas	Unreleased	May 9, 2017	May 9, 2017		
Cafeteria Nipponica	Simulation	Kairosoft	Kairosoft	Oct 1, 2020	Oct 1, 2020	Oct 1, 2020		
Cake Bash	Party; beat 'em up	High Tea Frog	Coatsink	Nov 19, 2020	Oct 15, 2020	Oct 15, 2020		
Caladrius Blaze	Shoot 'em up	Moss	H2 Interactive	Aug 9, 2016	Aug 9, 2016	Aug 9, 2016		
Calamity Angels: Special Delivery	Role-playing	Compile Heart	Idea Factory International	Jun 26, 2025	TBA	TBA		
The Caligula Effect 2	Role-playing	Historia	JP: FuRyu; WW: NIS America	Jun 24, 2021	Oct 19, 2021	Oct 22, 2021		
The Caligula Effect: Overdose	Role-playing	Historia	JP: FuRyu; WW: NIS America	May 17, 2018	Mar 12, 2019	Mar 15, 2019		
Call of Cthulhu: The Official Video Game	Adventure, horror	Frogwares	Focus Home Interactive	Mar 28, 2019	Oct 30, 2018	Oct 30, 2018		
Call of Duty: Advanced Warfare	First-person shooter	Sledgehammer Games	JP: Square Enix; WW: Activision	Nov 13, 2014	Nov 4, 2014	Nov 4, 2014		
Call of Duty: Black Ops	First-person shooter	Iron Galaxy; Treyarch	Activision	Jul 9, 2026	Jul 9, 2026	Jul 9, 2026		
Call of Duty: Black Ops II	First-person shooter	Iron Galaxy; Treyarch	Activision	Jul 9, 2026	Jul 9, 2026	Jul 9, 2026		
Call of Duty: Black Ops III	First-person shooter	Treyarch	JP: Sony Computer Entertainment; WW: Activision	Nov 6, 2015	Nov 6, 2015	Nov 6, 2015	P	
Call of Duty: Black Ops 4	First-person shooter	Treyarch	JP: Sony Interactive Entertainment; WW: Activision	Oct 12, 2018	Oct 12, 2018	Oct 12, 2018	P	
Call of Duty: Black Ops Cold War	First-person shooter	Raven Software; Treyarch	JP: Sony Interactive Entertainment; WW: Activision	Nov 13, 2020	Nov 13, 2020	Nov 13, 2020	CP	
Call of Duty: Black Ops 6	First-person shooter	Raven Software; Treyarch	Activision	Oct 25, 2024	Oct 25, 2024	Oct 25, 2024		
Call of Duty: Black Ops 7	First-person shooter	Raven Software; Treyarch	Activision	Nov 14, 2025	Nov 14, 2025	Nov 14, 2025		
Call of Duty: Ghosts	First-person shooter	Infinity Ward	JP: Square Enix; WW: Activision	Feb 22, 2014	Nov 15, 2013	Nov 29, 2013		
Call of Duty: Infinite Warfare	First-person shooter	Infinity Ward	JP: Sony Interactive Entertainment; WW: Activision	Nov 4, 2016	Nov 4, 2016	Nov 4, 2016	P	
Call of Duty: Modern Warfare	First-person shooter	Infinity Ward	JP: Sony Interactive Entertainment; WW: Activision	Oct 25, 2019	Oct 25, 2019	Oct 25, 2019	CP P	
Call of Duty: Modern Warfare II	First-person shooter	Infinity Ward	Activision	Oct 28, 2022	Oct 28, 2022	Oct 28, 2022	CP P	
Call Of Duty: Modern Warfare III	First-person shooter	Sledgehammer Games	Activision	Nov 10, 2023	Nov 10, 2023	Nov 10, 2023	CP P	
Call of Duty: Modern Warfare Remastered	First-person shooter	Raven Software	JP: Sony Interactive Entertainment; WW: Activision	Nov 4, 2016	Nov 4, 2016	Nov 4, 2016	P	
Call of Duty: Modern Warfare 2 Campaign Remastered	First-person shooter	Beenox	JP: Sony Interactive Entertainment; WW: Activision	Mar 31, 2020	Mar 31, 2020	Mar 31, 2020		
Call of Duty: Vanguard	First-person shooter	Sledgehammer Games	JP: Sony Interactive Entertainment; WW: Activision	Nov 5, 2021	Nov 5, 2021	Nov 5, 2021		
Call of Duty: Warzone	Battle royale; First-person shooter	Infinity Ward; Raven Software	JP: Sony Interactive Entertainment; WW: Activision	Mar 10, 2020	Mar 10, 2020	Mar 10, 2020	CP P	
Call of Duty: Warzone 2.0	Battle royale; first-person shooter	Infinity Ward; Raven Software	Activision	Nov 16, 2022	Nov 16, 2022	Nov 16, 2022		
Call of Duty: WWII	First-person shooter	Sledgehammer Games	JP: Sony Interactive Entertainment; WW: Activision	Nov 3, 2017	Nov 3, 2017	Nov 3, 2017	P	
Call of the Sea	Adventure; puzzle	Out of the Blue	Raw Fury	May 11, 2021	May 11, 2021	May 11, 2021		
Calvino Noir	Adventure	Calvino Noir	Calvino Noir	Unreleased	Aug 25, 2015	Aug 25, 2015		
Candlelight	Platform	Pixel Maverick	Pixel Maverick	Unreleased	Mar 15, 2016	Unreleased		
Candleman: The Complete Journey	Puzzle	Spotlightor Interactive	Zodiac Interactive	Unreleased	Aug 21, 2018	Aug 21, 2018		
Candle: The Power of the Flame	Adventure; platform	Teku Studios	Merge Games	Oct 10, 2019	Jul 24, 2018	Jul 25, 2018		
Cannon Brawl	Action; strategy	Turtle Sandbox; BlitWorks	Turtle Sandbox	Unreleased	Aug 2, 2016	Aug 2, 2016		
Can't Drive This	Racing	Pixel Maniacs	Perp Games	Mar 19, 2021	Mar 19, 2021	Mar 19, 2021		
Capcom Arcade Stadium	Arcade	Capcom	Capcom	May 25, 2021	May 25, 2021	May 25, 2021		
Capcom Beat 'Em Up Bundle	Beat 'em up	Capcom	Capcom	Sep 20, 2018	Sep 18, 2018	Sep 18, 2018		
Capcom Fighting Collection	Fighting	Capcom	Capcom	Jun 24, 2022	Jun 24, 2022	Jun 24, 2022		
Capsule Force	Action	Klobit	Iron Galaxy Studios	Unreleased	Jul 23, 2015	Jul 23, 2015		
Captain Tsubasa: Rise of New Champions	Sports	Tamsoft	Bandai Namco Entertainment	Aug 27, 2020	Aug 28, 2020	Aug 28, 2020		
Cardpocalypse	Card game; role-playing	Gambrinous	Versus Evil	Unreleased	Dec 12, 2019	Dec 12, 2019		
Carmageddon: Max Damage	Vehicular combat	Stainless Games	Stainless Games	Jul 8, 2016	Jul 8, 2016	Jul 8, 2016		
Carmen Sandiego	Puzzle adventure	Gameloft	Gameloft	Mar 4, 2025	Mar 4, 2025	Mar 4, 2025		
Car Mechanic Simulator 2018	Simulation	Red Dot Games	PlayWay	Unreleased	Jun 25, 2019	Jun 25, 2019		
Carrion	Horror	Phobia Game Studio	Devolver Digital	Oct 21, 2021	Oct 22, 2021	Oct 22, 2021		
Cars 3: Driven to Win	Racing	Avalanche Software	WB Games	Jul 20, 2017	Jul 13, 2017	Jul 14, 2017		
Carto	Adventure; puzzle	Sunhead Games	Humble Games	Oct 27, 2020	Oct 27, 2020	Oct 27, 2020		
Cartoon Network: Battle Crashers	Beat 'em up	Magic Pockets	GameMill Entertainment	Unreleased	Nov 8, 2016	Nov 8, 2016		
CarX Drift Racing Online	Racing; drifting	CarX Technologies	CarX Technologies	Jan 16, 2020	Feb 7, 2020	Dec 12, 2019		
Casey Powell Lacrosse 16	Sports	Crosse Studios	Big Ant Studios	Mar 9, 2016	Mar 9, 2016	Mar 9, 2016		
Castaway Paradise	Simulation	Rokaplay	Rokaplay	Unreleased	Jul 31, 2018	Jul 31, 2018		
Castle Crashers Remastered	Beat 'em up	The Behemoth	The Behemoth	Unreleased	Sep 17, 2019	Sep 19, 2019		
The Castle Game	Tower defense	Neptune	Neptune	Aug 5, 2015	Aug 5, 2015	Aug 5, 2015		
Castles	Puzzle	WhootGames	BadLand Indie	Unreleased	Jun 28, 2016	Jun 29, 2016		
CastleStorm: Definitive Edition	Tower defense	Zen Studios	Zen Studios	Mar 11, 2015	Sep 23, 2014	Oct 15, 2014	3D	
CastleStorm II	Tower defense	Zen Studios	Zen Studios	Jul 31, 2020	Jul 31, 2020	Jul 31, 2020		
Castlevania Advance Collection	Action; platform-adventure	Konami	Konami	Sep 23, 2021	Sep 23, 2021	Sep 23, 2021		
Castlevania Anniversary Collection	Action; platform-adventure	Konami	Konami	May 16, 2019	May 16, 2019	May 16, 2019		
Castlevania Requiem	Action; platform-adventure	Konami	Konami	Oct 25, 2018	Oct 26, 2018	Oct 26, 2018	P	
Catherine: Full Body	Puzzle-platform	Studio Zero	Atlus	Feb 14, 2019	Sep 3, 2019	Sep 3, 2019		
Catlateral Damage	Simulation	Manekoware	Fire Hose Games	Oct 13, 2016	Mar 22, 2016	Jun 13, 2016		
Cat Quest	Action role-playing	The Gentlebros	PQube	Nov 27, 2017	Nov 14, 2017	Nov 10, 2017		
Cat Quest II	Action role-playing	The Gentlebros	PQube	Oct 24, 2019	Oct 24, 2019	Oct 24, 2019		
Cel Damage HD	Racing	Finish Line Games	Finish Line Games	Unreleased	Apr 22, 2014	May 14, 2014		
Celeste	Platform	Matt Thorson	Matt Makes Games	Sep 10, 2019	Jan 25, 2018	Jan 25, 2018		
The Centennial Case: A Shijima Story	Adventure	h.a.n.d.	Square Enix	May 12, 2022	May 12, 2022	May 12, 2022		
Centipede: Recharged	Puzzle	Adamvision Studios; SneakyBox	Atari, Inc.	Unreleased	Sep 29, 2021	Sep 29, 2021		
Chained Echoes	Role-playing	Ark Heiral	Deck13 Spotlight	Dec 8, 2022	Dec 8, 2022	Dec 8, 2022		
Chambara	Action	Team OK	USC Games	Unreleased	Jul 26, 2016	Unreleased		
Chaos;Child	Visual novel	Nitroplus	5pb.	Jun 25, 2015	Oct 24, 2017	Oct 13, 2017		
Chaos Code: New Sign of Catastrophe	Fighting	FK Digital	Arc System Works	Mar 15, 2017	Mar 15, 2017	Mar 15, 2017		
Chaos on Deponia	Point-and-click adventure	Daedalic Entertainment	Daedalic Entertainment	Dec 6, 2017	Dec 6, 2017	Dec 6, 2017		
Chariot	Adventure, platform	Frima Studio	Frima Studio	Mar 25, 2015	Sep 30, 2014	Oct 29, 2014		
Chasm	Metroidvania	Bit Kid	Bit Kid	Jul 31, 2018	Jul 31, 2018	Jul 31, 2018		
Checkers	Card & board	Sabec	Sabec	Unreleased	Nov 27, 2020	Nov 27, 2020		
Chernobylite	Survival	The Farm 51	All in! Games	Sep 7, 2021	Sep 7, 2021	Sep 7, 2021		
Chess Ultra	Chess	Ripstone	Ripstone	Unreleased	Jun 20, 2017	Jun 21, 2017	P	
Chicken Police: Paint it Red!	Adventure	The Wild Gentlemen	HandyGames	Dec 9, 2020	Nov 5, 2020	Nov 5, 2020		
Chicory: A Colorful Tale	Adventure	Greg Lobanov	Finji	Jun 10, 2021	Jun 10, 2021	Jun 10, 2021		
Child of Light	Role-playing	Ubisoft Montreal	Ubisoft	May 1, 2014	Apr 29, 2014	Apr 30, 2014		
Children of Morta	Action role-playing	Dead Mage	JP: Exnoa; WW: 11 Bit Studios	Dec 16, 2020	Oct 15, 2019	Oct 15, 2019		
Children of Zodiarcs	Tactical role-playing	Cardboard Utopia	Square Enix	Unreleased	Jul 18, 2017	Jul 18, 2017		
Chimparty	Arcade, party	NapNok Games	Sony Interactive Entertainment	Unreleased	Nov 14, 2018	Nov 14, 2018	PL	
Chime Sharp	Music, puzzle	Zoë Mode	Chilled Mouse	Feb 21, 2017	Feb 21, 2017	Feb 21, 2017		
Chivalry: Medieval Warfare	Hack and slash	Torn Banner Studios	Activision	Dec 1, 2015	Dec 1, 2015	Dec 1, 2015		
Chivalry 2	Hack and slash	Torn Banner Studios	Tripwire Interactive	Jun 8, 2021	Jun 8, 2021	Jun 8, 2021	CP	
Chocobo's Mystery Dungeon Every Buddy!	Role-playing	Square Enix	Square Enix	Mar 20, 2019	Mar 20, 2019	Mar 20, 2019		
Chop is Dish	Platform	Victory Road	Victory Road	Feb 20, 2020	Feb 20, 2020	Feb 20, 2020		
Chorus: Rise As One	Space combat	Fishlabs	Deep Silver	Dec 3, 2021	Dec 3, 2021	Dec 3, 2021		
ChromaGun	First-person shooter, puzzle	Pixel Maniacs	Pixel Maniacs	Unreleased	Aug 22, 2017	Aug 22, 2017	VR	
Chroma Squad	Turn-based	Behold Studios	Bandai Namco Entertainment	May 19, 2017	May 19, 2017	May 19, 2017		
Chronicles of Teddy: Harmony of Exidus	Adventure	LookAtMyGame	Aksys Games	Dec 14, 2016	Mar 29, 2016	Mar 29, 2016		
Chronos: Before the Ashes	Action role-playing	Gunfire Games	THQ Nordic	Jan 18, 2021	Dec 1, 2020	Dec 1, 2020	P	
The Church in the Darkness	Action	Paranoid Productions	Paranoid Productions	Oct 3, 2019	Aug 2, 2019	Aug 2, 2019		
Ciel Nosurge DX	Life simulation	Gust Co. Ltd.	Koei Tecmo	Mar 4, 2021	Unreleased	Unreleased		
Cinders	Visual novel	MoaCube	Crunching Koalas	Unreleased	Aug 25, 2020	Aug 25, 2020		
Circuit Superstars	Racing	Original Fire Games	Square Enix Collective	Jan 27, 2022	Jan 27, 2022	Jan 27, 2022		
Circuits	Puzzle	Digital Tentacle	JP: EastAsiaSoft; NA: Rendercode Games	May 21, 2020	Jun 12, 2018	Nov 12, 2020		
Citadel: Forged with Fire	Massively multiplayer online	Blue Isle Studios	Blue Isle Studios	Dec 5, 2019	Nov 1, 2019	Nov 1, 2019		
Cities: Skylines	Simulation	Tantalus Media	Paradox Interactive	Apr 12, 2018	Aug 15, 2017	Aug 15, 2017	P	
Citizen Sleeper	Role-playing	Jump Over the Age	Fellow Traveller	Jan 31, 2024	Mar 31, 2023	Mar 31, 2023		
Citizens of Earth	Role-playing	Atlus	Eden Industries	Oct 26, 2016	Jan 20, 2015	Jan 21, 2015		
Citizens of Space	Role-playing	Eden Industries	Sega	Unreleased	Jun 18, 2019	Jun 18, 2019		
City Limits	Strategy	JanduSoft	SpaceMyFriend	Jul 5, 2023	Jul 5, 2023	Jul 5, 2023		
City Shrouded in Shadow	Action	Granzella	Bandai Namco Entertainment	Oct 19, 2017	Unreleased	Unreleased		
Civilization VI	4X; turn-based strategy	Firaxis Games	2K Games	Nov 22, 2019	Nov 22, 2019	Nov 22, 2019	P	
Civilization VII	4X; turn-based strategy	Firaxis Games	2K Games	Feb 11, 2025	Feb 11, 2025	Feb 11, 2025		
Cladun Returns: This is Sengoku!	Role-playing	Nippon Ichi Software	NIS America	Unreleased	Jun 6, 2017	Jun 17, 2017	P	
Claire: Extended Cut	Adventure	Hailstorm Games	Hailstorm Games	Unreleased	Aug 30, 2016	Aug 30, 2016		
Clannad	Visual novel	Key	Prototype	Jun 14, 2018	Jun 21, 2018	Unreleased		
Claybook	Puzzle	Second Order	Second Order	Unreleased	Aug 31, 2018	Aug 31, 2018	P	
Clid the Snail	Shoot 'em up	Weird Beluga Studio	Koch Media	Aug 30, 2021	Aug 30, 2021	Aug 30, 2021		
Clockwork Aquario	Arcade; platform	Westone Bit Entertainment	Inin Games	Nov 30, 2021	Dec 14, 2021	Nov 30, 2021		
Clockwork Tales: Of Glass and Ink	Puzzle; hidden object	Artifex Mundi	Artifex Mundi	Unreleased	Nov 29, 2016	Nov 29, 2016		
Clone Drone in the Danger Zone	Action; fighting	Doborog Games	Doborog Games	Unreleased	Jul 27, 2021	Jul 27, 2021		
Close to the Sun	Horror; adventure	Storm in a Teacup	Wired Productions	Unreleased	Oct 29, 2019	Oct 29, 2019		
Cloudpunk	Adventure	Ion Lands	Merge Games	Oct 15, 2020	Oct 15, 2020	Oct 15, 2020		
Clustertruck	Platform	Landfall Games	TinyBuild	Sep 27, 2016	Sep 27, 2016	Sep 27, 2016		
Cobra Kai: The Karate Kid Saga Continues	Beat 'em up	Flux Game Studio	GameMill Entertainment	Unreleased	Oct 27, 2020	Oct 27, 2020		
Code Vein	Action role-playing	Bandai Namco	Bandai Namco	Sep 26, 2019	Sep 27, 2019	Sep 27, 2019		
Coffee Talk	Visual novel	Toge Productions	Chorus Worldwide	Jan 30, 2020	Jan 28, 2020	Jan 28, 2020		
Coffin Dodgers	Racing	Milky Tea Studios	Wales Interactive	Unreleased	May 3, 2016	May 3, 2016		
Cogen: Sword of Rewind	Platform	Gemdrops	Gemdrops	Jan 22, 2022	Jan 22, 2022	Jan 22, 2022		
Colt Canyon	Twin-stick shooter	Retrific	Headup Games	Unreleased	Dec 23, 2020	Dec 23, 2020	P	
The Coma: Recut	Survival horror	Devespresso Games	Digerati	Unreleased	Sep 21, 2017	Sep 21, 2017		
The Coma 2: Vicious Sisters	Survival horror	Devespresso Games	Headup Games	Aug 6, 2020	Jun 19, 2020	Jun 19, 2020		
Comet Crash 2	Real-time strategy	Pelfast	Pelfast	Aug 10, 2017	Aug 8, 2017	Aug 8, 2017		
Commander Cherry's Puzzled Journey	Platform	Grande Games	Grande Games	Unreleased	Aug 11, 2015	Aug 11, 2015	C	
Commandos 2 - HD Remaster	Real-time tactics	Yippee!; Pyro Studios	Kalypso Media	Dec 17, 2021	Sep 18, 2020	Sep 18, 2020		
Conan Chop Chop	Action-adventure	Mighty Kingdom	Funcom	Unreleased	TBA	TBA		
Conan Exiles	Open world, survival	Funcom	Koch Media	May 8, 2018	May 8, 2018	May 8, 2018		
Conarium	Horror	Zoetrope Interactive	Iceberg Interactive	Unreleased	Feb 12, 2019	Feb 12, 2019	P	
Concept Destruction	Vehicular combat	Ratalaika Games	Ratalaika Games	Unreleased	May 19, 2020	May 20, 2020	CB	
Conception Plus: Maidens of the Twelve Stars	Role-playing	Spike Chunsoft	Spike Chunsoft	Jan 31, 2019	Nov 5, 2019	Nov 8, 2019		
Concrete Genie	Adventure	Pixelopus	Sony Interactive Entertainment	Oct 8, 2019	Oct 8, 2019	Oct 8, 2019	P VR	
Conga Master	Action	Undercoders	Rising Star Games	Unreleased	Jul 21, 2017	Jul 21, 2017		
Conglomerate 451: Overloaded	Dungeon crawler	RuneHeads	34BigThings	Jun 3, 2021	Jun 3, 2021	Jun 3, 2021		
Construction Simulator 2: Console Edition	Simulation; strategy	weltenbauer	Astragon Entertainment	Sep 21, 2018	Sep 12, 2018	Sep 12, 2018	P	
Construction Simulator 3: Console Edition	Simulation; strategy	weltenbauer	Astragon Entertainment	Apr 10, 2018	Apr 7, 2018	Apr 7, 2018	P	
Constructor HD	City-building	System 3	System 3	Unreleased	May 26, 2017	May 26, 2017		
Constructor Plus	City-building	System 3	System 3	Unreleased	Apr 12, 2019	Apr 2, 2019		
Contra Anniversary Collection	Run and gun	Konami	Konami	Jun 12, 2019	Jun 11, 2019	Jun 11, 2019		
Contra: Rogue Corps	Run and gun	Konami	Konami	Sep 26, 2019	Sep 24, 2019	Sep 24, 2019		
Contrast	Platform, puzzle	Compulsion Games	Compulsion Games	Feb 22, 2014	Nov 15, 2013	Nov 29, 2013		
Control	Third-person shooter	Remedy Entertainment	505 Games	Aug 27, 2019	Aug 27, 2019	Aug 27, 2019		
Convallaria	Action	Loong Force	Loong Force	TBA	TBA	TBA		
Convoy: A Tactical Roguelike	Vehicular combat; strategy	Convoy Games	Triangle Studios	Unreleased	Apr 8, 2020	Apr 8, 2020		
Cook, Serve, Delicious! 2	Simulation	Vertigo Gaming	Vertigo Gaming	Unreleased	Dec 18, 2018	Dec 18, 2018		
Cook, Serve, Delicious! 3	Simulation	Vertigo Gaming	Vertigo Gaming	Unreleased	Oct 14, 2020	Oct 14, 2020		
Core Keeper	Sandbox; Survival	Pugstorm	Fireshine Games	Sep 17, 2024	Sep 17, 2024	Sep 17, 2024		
Corpse Party: Blood Covered Repeated Fear	Survival horror	Team GrisGris; Mages	JP: Mages; WW: Xseed Games	Feb 18, 2021	Oct 20, 2021	Oct 20, 2021		
Cosmic Star Heroine	Role-playing	Zeboyd Games	Zeboyd Games	Unreleased	Apr 11, 2017	Apr 11, 2017		
Costume Quest 2	Adventure, role-playing	Double Fine Productions	Double Fine Productions	Oct 31, 2014	Oct 31, 2014	Oct 31, 2014		
Cotton 100%	Shoot 'em up	Success	JP: Sunsoft; WW: ININ Games	Oct 29, 2021	Oct 29, 2021	Oct 29, 2021		
Cotton Reboot!	Shoot 'em up	Sangatu Usagi no Mori	JP: Beep; WW: Inin Games	Feb 25, 2021	Jul 20, 2021	Jul 20, 2021		
Cotton Rock 'n' Roll	Shoot 'em up	Success	Success	Dec 23, 2021	TBA	TBA		
The Count Lucanor	Action-adventure	Baroque Decay	Merge Games	Jan 9, 2018	Jan 9, 2018	Jan 9, 2018		
CounterSpy	Side-scroller; stealth	Dynamighty	Sony Computer Entertainment	Aug 21, 2014	Aug 19, 2014	Aug 20, 2014		
The Cub	Adventure	Demagog Studio	Untold Tales S.A.	Jan 19, 2024	Jan 19, 2024	Jan 19, 2024		
Cozy Grove	Adventure; hidden object	Spry Fox	Quantum Astrophysicists Guild	Apr 7, 2021	Apr 7, 2021	Apr 7, 2021		
Crash Bandicoot 4: It's About Time	Platform	Toys for Bob	Activision	Oct 2, 2020	Oct 2, 2020	Oct 2, 2020		
Crash Bandicoot N. Sane Trilogy	Platform	Vicarious Visions	JP: Sony Interactive Entertainment; WW: Activision	Aug 3, 2017	Jun 30, 2017	Jun 30, 2017	P	
Crash Team Racing Nitro-Fueled	Kart racing	Beenox	JP: Sega; WW: Activision	Jun 21, 2019	Jun 21, 2019	Jun 21, 2019	P	
Crawl	Roguelike, brawler	Powerhoof	Powerhoof	Apr 11, 2017	Apr 11, 2017	Apr 11, 2017		
Crayola Scoot	Sports	Climax Studios	Outright Games	Unreleased	Oct 16, 2018	Nov 2, 2018		
Crazy Strike Bowling EX	Sports	Corecell Technology	Corecell Technology	Unreleased	May 25, 2016	Jun 14, 2016	M	
Creaks	Adventure; puzzle	Amanita Design	Amanita Design	Jul 22, 2020	Jul 22, 2020	Jul 22, 2020	P	
Creature in the Well	Dungeon crawler; hack and slash	Flight School Studio	MWM Interactive	Oct 20, 2021	Mar 31, 2020	Mar 24, 2020	P	
The Crew	Racing	Ubisoft Ivory Tower	Ubisoft	Dec 4, 2014	Dec 2, 2014	Dec 2, 2014		
The Crew 2	Racing	Ubisoft Ivory Tower	Ubisoft	Jun 29, 2018	Jun 29, 2018	Jun 29, 2018	P	
The Crew Motorfest	Racing	Ubisoft Ivory Tower	Ubisoft	Sep 14, 2023	Sep 14, 2023	Sep 14, 2023	P	
Cricket 19	Sports	Big Ant Studios	Big Ant Studios	May 28, 2019	May 28, 2019	May 28, 2019		
Cricket 22	Sports	Big Ant Studios	Nacon	Unreleased	Nov 25, 2021	Nov 25, 2021		
Cricket 24	Sports	Murtaza Hakeemzada and CO	Nacon	Oct 5, 2023	Oct 5, 2023	Oct 5, 2023		
Cris Tales	Role-playing	Dreams Uncorporated; SYCK	Modus Games	Unreleased	Jul 20, 2021	Jul 20, 2021		
Crisis Core -Final Fantasy VII- Reunion	Role-playing	Square Enix	Square Enix	Dec 13, 2022	Dec 13, 2022	Dec 13, 2022		
CrossCode	Action role-playing	Radical Fish Games	Deck13	Jul 9, 2020	Jul 9, 2020	Jul 9, 2020		
Crossing Souls	Action-adventure	Fourattic	Devolver Digital	Feb 13, 2018	Feb 13, 2018	Feb 13, 2018		
CrossKrush	Puzzle	Thinice Games	Ratalaika Games	Oct 22, 2020	Oct 20, 2020	Oct 21, 2020		
Crown Trick	Action role-playing	Next Studios	Next Studios	Aug 31, 2021	Aug 31, 2021	Aug 31, 2021		
Crows: Burning Edge	Action-adventure	Bandai Namco Entertainment	Bandai Namco Entertainment	Oct 27, 2016	Unreleased	Unreleased		
Crow Country	Survival horror	SFB Games	SFB Games	Oct 16, 2024	Oct 16, 2024	Oct 16, 2024		
The Cruel King and the Great Hero	Role-playing	Nippon Ichi Software	JP: Nippon Ichi Software; WW: NIS America	Jun 24, 2021	Mar 1, 2022	Mar 4, 2022		
Crypt of the NecroDancer	Roguelike, rhythm	Brace Yourself Games	Brace Yourself Games	Jan 18, 2016	Feb 2, 2016	Feb 2, 2016		
Cryptark	Shoot 'em up	Alientrap	Alientrap	Unreleased	Jun 20, 2017	Jun 20, 2017		
Crysis Remastered	First-person shooter	Crytek; Saber Interactive	Crytek	Oct 9, 2020	Sep 18, 2020	Sep 18, 2020	P	
Crysis 2 Remastered	First-person shooter	Crytek; Saber Interactive	Crytek	Oct 15, 2021	Oct 15, 2021	Oct 15, 2021	P	
Crysis 3 Remastered	First-person shooter	Crytek; Saber Interactive	Crytek	Oct 15, 2021	Oct 15, 2021	Oct 15, 2021	P	
Crystal Crisis	Puzzle	Nicalis	JP: Pikii; WW: Nicalis	Aug 1, 2019	Jun 18, 2019	Jun 19, 2019		
Crystar	Action role-playing	Gemdrops	JP: FuRyu; WW: Spike Chunsoft	Oct 18, 2018	Aug 27, 2019	Aug 30, 2019		
Cube Life: Island Survival HD	Sandbox	Cypronia	Cypronia	TBA	TBA	TBA		
Cubers: Arena	Brawler	Teyon	Teyon	Unreleased	Jul 28, 2020	Jul 28, 2020		
Cult of the Lamb	Roguelike	Massive Monster	Devolver Digital	Aug 11, 2022	Aug 11, 2022	Aug 11, 2022		
Cuphead	Run and gun	StudioMDHR	StudioMDHR	Jul 29, 2020	Jul 28, 2020	Jul 28, 2020		
Curious Expedition	Strategy	Maschinen-Mensch	Thunderful Publishing	Unreleased	Mar 31, 2020	Apr 2, 2020		
Curses 'N Chaos	Action	Tribute Games	Tribute Games	Aug 18, 2015	Aug 18, 2015	Aug 18, 2015	CP	
Curse of the Dead Gods	Action role-playing; roguelike	Passtech Games	Focus Home Interactive	Feb 26, 2021	Feb 23, 2021	Feb 23, 2021		
Cyber Citizen Shockman	Action platformer	Shinyuden	Ratalaika Games	May 18, 2023	May 18, 2023	May 18, 2023		
Cyber Citizen Shockman 3: The Princess from Another World	Action platformer	Shinyuden	Ratalaika Games	May 3, 2024	May 3, 2024	May 3, 2024		
Cyberdimension Neptunia: 4 Goddesses Online	Action role-playing	Compile Heart; Tamsoft	Idea Factory	Feb 9, 2017	Oct 13, 2017	Oct 10, 2017	CP	
Cyberpunk 2077	Action role-playing	CD Projekt Red	CD Projekt Red	Dec 10, 2020	Dec 10, 2020	Dec 10, 2020	CB P	
Cyber Troopers Virtual-On Masterpiece 1995–2001	Action	Sega	Sega	Nov 27, 2019	Unreleased	Unreleased		
Daggerhood	Action; platform	Woblyware	Ratalaika Games	Mar 6, 2019	Aug 14, 2020	Feb 19, 2019		
Daisenryaku: Dai Toua Kouboushi 3	War simulation	SystemSoft Alpha	SystemSoft Alpha	Dec 17, 2015	Unreleased	Unreleased		
Dakar 18	Racing	Bigmoon Entertainment	Deep Silver	Unreleased	Sep 28, 2018	Sep 25, 2018		
Damsel	Action; platform	Screwtape Studios	EastAsiaSoft	Oct 1, 2020	Sep 30, 2020	Oct 1, 2020		
Dandara	Platform	Long Hat House	Raw Fury	Feb 6, 2018	Feb 6, 2018	Feb 6, 2018		
Danganronpa 1-2 Reload	Adventure, visual novel	Spike Chunsoft	NIS America	May 18, 2017	Mar 14, 2017	Mar 17, 2017	P	
Danganronpa V3: Killing Harmony	Adventure, visual novel	Spike Chunsoft	NIS America	Jan 12, 2017	Sep 26, 2017	Sep 29, 2017	P	
Danganronpa Another Episode: Ultra Despair Girls	Adventure	Spike Chunsoft	NIS America	Jun 29, 2017	Jun 27, 2017	Jun 23, 2017	P	
Danganronpa Trilogy	Adventure, visual novel	Spike Chunsoft	NIS America	Mar 29, 2019	Mar 26, 2019	Mar 29, 2019	P	
Dangerous Golf	Sports	Three Fields Entertainment	Three Fields Entertainment	Jun 2, 2016	Jun 2, 2016	Jun 2, 2016		
Danger Zone	Racing	Three Fields Entertainment	Three Fields Entertainment	May 30, 2017	May 30, 2017	May 30, 2017	P	
Dangun Feveron	Shoot 'em up	Cave; M2	Cave	Apr 28, 2017	Apr 4, 2018	Apr 4, 2018		
Dariusburst Chronicle Saviours	Shoot 'em up	Pyramid	Degica	Jan 15, 2016	Dec 2, 2015	Dec 8, 2015		
Darius Cozmic Collection	Shoot 'em up	M2	JP: Taito; WW: Inin Games	Mar 5, 2020	Jun 16, 2020	Jun 16, 2020		
Darius Cozmic Revelation	Shoot 'em up	Taito	JP: Taito; WW: Inin Games	Feb 25, 2021	TBA	TBA		
Dark Arcana: The Carnival	Puzzle; hidden object	Artifex Mundi	Artifex Mundi	Unreleased	Jun 27, 2017	Jun 27, 2017		
Dark Devotion	Action role-playing; soulslike	Hibernian Workshop	The Arcade Crew	Oct 25, 2019	Oct 24, 2019	Oct 24, 2019		
Dark Envoy	Role-playing	Event Horizon	Event Horizon	TBA	TBA	TBA		
The Dark Pictures Anthology: House of Ashes	Horror	Supermassive Games	Bandai Namco Entertainment	Unreleased	Oct 22, 2021	Oct 22, 2021	CB	
The Dark Pictures Anthology: Little Hope	Horror	Supermassive Games	Bandai Namco Entertainment	Dec 3, 2020	Oct 30, 2020	Oct 30, 2020	P	
The Dark Pictures Anthology: Man of Medan	Horror	Supermassive Games	Bandai Namco Entertainment	Dec 5, 2019	Aug 30, 2019	Aug 30, 2019	P	
Dark Rose Valkyrie	Role-playing	Compile Heart	Idea Factory	Jul 21, 2016	Jun 6, 2017	Jun 9, 2017		
Dark Souls Remastered	Action role-playing	FromSoftware	Bandai Namco Entertainment	May 24, 2018	May 25, 2018	May 25, 2018	P	
Dark Souls II	Action role-playing	FromSoftware	Bandai Namco Entertainment	Apr 9, 2015	Apr 7, 2015	Apr 9, 2015		
Dark Souls III	Action role-playing	FromSoftware	Bandai Namco Entertainment	Mar 24, 2016	Apr 12, 2016	Apr 12, 2016		
Darkest Dungeon	Turn-based strategy	Red Hook Studios	Red Hook Studios	Sep 27, 2016	Sep 27, 2016	Sep 27, 2016		
Darkestville Castle	Point-and-click adventure	Epic LLama	Buka Entertainment	Unreleased	Aug 13, 2020	Aug 13, 2020		
Darksiders Genesis	Action role-playing; hack and slash	Airship Syndicate	THQ Nordic	Feb 14, 2020	Feb 14, 2020	Feb 14, 2020		
Darksiders: Warmastered Edition	Action role-playing	THQ Nordic	THQ Nordic	Nov 24, 2017	Nov 22, 2016	Nov 22, 2016	P	
Darksiders II: Deathinitive Edition	Action role-playing; hack and slash	Gunfire Games	Nordic Games	Oct 5, 2017	Oct 30, 2015	Oct 27, 2015		
Darksiders III	Action role-playing; hack and slash	Gunfire Games	THQ Nordic	Nov 27, 2018	Nov 27, 2018	Nov 27, 2018		
Darkwood	Survival horror	Acid Wizard Studio	Crunching Koalas	Sep 1, 2021	May 14, 2019	May 14, 2019		
Darq: Complete Edition	Psychological horror	Unfold Games	Feardemic	Unreleased	Dec 4, 2020	Dec 4, 2020		
Dawn of the Monsters	Beat 'em up	13AM Games	WayForward	Mar 15, 2022	Mar 15, 2022	Mar 15, 2022		
Daylight	Survival horror	Zombie Studios	Atlus	Aug 28, 2014	Apr 30, 2014	Apr 30, 2014	3D	
Daymare: 1998	Survival horror	Invader Studios	Invader Studios	Feb 20, 2020	Apr 28, 2020	Apr 28, 2020		
Day of the Tentacle: Remastered Edition	Graphic adventure	Double Fine Productions	Double Fine Productions	Mar 22, 2016	Mar 22, 2016	Mar 22, 2016		
Days Gone	Open world; survival	Bend Studio	Sony Interactive Entertainment	Apr 26, 2019	Apr 26, 2019	Apr 26, 2019	P	
DayZ	Survival	Bohemia Interactive	Bohemia Interactive	May 29, 2019	May 29, 2019	May 29, 2019	P	
Dead Alliance	First-person shooter	Psyop Games; IllFonic	Maximum Games	Unreleased	Aug 29, 2017	Aug 29, 2017		
Dead by Daylight	Survival horror	Behaviour Interactive	Starbreeze Studios	Jun 23, 2017	Jun 23, 2017	Jun 23, 2017	CB CP	
Dead Cells	Action; roguelike	Motion Twin	Motion Twin	Aug 7, 2018	Aug 7, 2018	Aug 7, 2018		
Deadcore	Platform; parkour	5 Bits Games	Grip Digital	Unreleased	Jul 14, 2017	Jul 14, 2017		
Deadcraft	Survival	Marvelous First Studio	JP: Marvelous; WW: Xseed Games	May 19, 2022	May 19, 2022	May 19, 2022		
Dead Island Definitive Edition	Survival horror	Techland	Deep Silver	May 31, 2016	May 31, 2016	May 31, 2016		
Dead Island 2	Survival horror	Yager Development	Deep Silver	Apr 28, 2023	Apr 28, 2023	Apr 28, 2023		
Deadlight: Director's Cut	Survival horror	Tequila Works	Deep Silver	Jun 21, 2016	Jun 21, 2016	Jun 21, 2016		
Deadly Dozen Reloaded	Tactical shooter	nFusion Interactive	Ziggurat Interactive	Unreleased	TBA	TBA		
The Deadly Tower of Monsters	Action-adventure	Ace Team	Atlus	Jan 19, 2016	Jan 19, 2016	Jan 19, 2016		
Dead Nation: Apocalypse Edition	Shoot 'em up	Housemarque	Sony Computer Entertainment	May 29, 2014	Mar 4, 2014	Mar 5, 2014		
Dead or Alive 5 Last Round	Fighting	Koei Tecmo	Koei Tecmo	Feb 19, 2015	Feb 17, 2015	Feb 20, 2015		
Dead or Alive 6	Fighting	Koei Tecmo	Koei Tecmo	Mar 1, 2019	Mar 1, 2019	Mar 1, 2019		
Dead or Alive Xtreme 3	Sports	Team Ninja	Koei Tecmo	Mar 24, 2016	Unreleased	Unreleased	VR	
Dead or School	Hack and slash	Studio Nanafushi	JP: Studio Nanafushi; WW: Marvelous Europe	Aug 29, 2019	Mar 13, 2020	Mar 13, 2020		
Deadpool	Action, beat 'em up	High Moon Studios	Activision	Unreleased	Nov 18, 2015	Nov 20, 2015		
Dead Rising	Survival horror	Capcom	Capcom	Aug 17, 2016	Sep 13, 2016	Sep 13, 2016		
Dead Rising 2	Survival horror	Capcom	Capcom	Sep 13, 2016	Sep 13, 2016	Sep 13, 2016		
Dead Rising 2: Off the Record	Survival horror	Capcom	Capcom	Sep 13, 2016	Sep 13, 2016	Sep 13, 2016		
Dead Rising 4	Survival horror	Capcom Vancouver	Capcom	Dec 7, 2017	Dec 5, 2017	Dec 5, 2017		
Dead Star	Shoot 'em up	Armature Studio	Armature Studio	Aug 3, 2016	Apr 5, 2016	Apr 5, 2016	CP	
Dead Synchronicity: Tomorrow Comes Today	Point-and-click adventure	Fictiorama Studios	Daedalic Entertainment	Unreleased	Apr 10, 2015	Apr 10, 2015		
Dear Esther	Exploration	The Chinese Room	Curve Digital	Unreleased	Sep 20, 2016	Sep 20, 2016		
Death Come True	Adventure	Too Kyo Games	IzanagiGames	Nov 12, 2020	Nov 12, 2020	Nov 12, 2020		
Death Coming	Strategy	Next Studios	Beijing Spirit Games	Apr 4, 2019	Feb 26, 2019	Mar 12, 2019		
Death Crown	Real-time strategy	Co5monaut; Stas Pisarev	Co5monaut	Unreleased	May 13, 2021	May 13, 2021		
Death end re;Quest	Role-playing	Idea Factory	Idea Factory	Apr 12, 2018	Feb 22, 2019	Feb 19, 2019	P	
Death end re;Quest 2	Role-playing	Idea Factory; Compile Heart	Idea Factory	Feb 13, 2020	Aug 25, 2020	Aug 28, 2020		
Death Stranding	Action	Kojima Productions	Sony Interactive Entertainment	Nov 8, 2019	Nov 8, 2019	Nov 8, 2019	P	
Death Squared	Puzzle	SMG Studios	SMG Studios	Unreleased	Mar 14, 2017	Mar 14, 2017		
Death's Door	Action-adventure	Acid Nerve	Devolver Digital	Unreleased	Nov 23, 2021	Nov 23, 2021		
Death's Gambit	Action role-playing	White Rabbit	Adult Swim Games	Unreleased	Aug 14, 2018	Aug 14, 2018		
Death's Gambit: Afterlife	Action role-playing	White Rabbit	Serenity Forge	Unreleased	TBA	TBA		
Deathsmiles I & II	Shoot 'em up	Cave Interactive	City Connection	Dec 16, 2021	Unreleased	Unreleased		
De Blob	Platform; puzzle	BlitWorks	THQ Nordic	Nov 14, 2017	Nov 14, 2017	Nov 14, 2017		
De Blob 2	Platform; puzzle	BlitWorks	THQ Nordic	Feb 27, 2018	Feb 27, 2018	Feb 27, 2018		
Debtor	Puzzle; Platformer	SharkGame	y-zo studio	Aug 17, 2025	Aug 17, 2025	Aug 17, 2025	CB	
Decay of Logos	Action role-playing	Amplify Creations	Rising Star Games	Aug 27, 2019	Aug 27, 2019	Aug 27, 2019		
Deception IV: The Nightmare Princess	Action, strategy	Tecmo Koei	Tecmo Koei	Mar 26, 2015	Jul 14, 2015	Jul 17, 2015		
Deemo: Reborn	Rhythm	Rayark	Unties	Nov 21, 2019	Nov 21, 2019	Nov 21, 2019	VR	
Deep Sky Derelicts: Definitive Edition	Role-playing; turn-based strategy	Snowhound Games	1C Entertainment	Unreleased	Mar 24, 2020	Mar 24, 2020		
Defenders of Ekron	Shoot 'em up	In Vitro Games	In Vitro Games	Mar 17, 2017	Aug 15, 2017	Aug 15, 2017		
Defense Grid 2	Tower defense	Hidden Path Entertainment	505 Games	Unreleased	Sep 23, 2014	Oct 1, 2014		
Deformers	Multiplayer online battle arena	Ready at Dawn	Ready at Dawn	Unreleased	Feb 14, 2017	Feb 14, 2017	CP	
Deiland	Adventure; role-playing	Chibig	Square Enix	Unreleased	May 3, 2018	Feb 28, 2018		
Deleveled	Puzzle	TQAG	TQAG	Unreleased	Sep 10, 2020	Sep 9, 2020		
Deliver Us the Moon	Adventure	KeokeN Interactive	KeokeN Interactive	Oct 8, 2020	Apr 24, 2020	Apr 24, 2020		
Deltarune	Role-playing	Toby Fox	8-4	Feb 28, 2019	Feb 28, 2019	Feb 28, 2019		
Demetrios: The Big Cynical Adventure	Point-and-click adventure	CowCat	CowCat	May 31, 2016	May 31, 2016	May 31, 2016		
Demon Gaze II	Dungeon crawler	Experience	JP: Kadokawa Games; WW: NIS America	Oct 13, 2016	Nov 17, 2017	Nov 14, 2017	CP P	
Demon Gaze Extra	Role-playing	Cattle Call	JP: Kadokawa Games; WW: Clouded Leopard Entertainment	Sep 2, 2021	Dec 9, 2021	Dec 9, 2021		
Demon Slayer: Kimetsu no Yaiba – The Hinokami Chronicles	Fighting	CyberConnect2	JP: Aniplex; WW: Sega	Oct 14, 2021	Oct 15, 2021	Oct 15, 2021		
Demon Turf	Platform	Fabraz	Playtonic Friends	Nov 4, 2021	Nov 4, 2021	Nov 4, 2021		
Demons Age	Role-playing	Bigmoon Entertainment	Bigmoon Entertainment	Unreleased	Unreleased	Apr 27, 2018		
Demon's Tier+	Role-playing; dungeon crawler	CowCat	CowCat	Unreleased	Jun 9, 2020	Jun 9, 2020		
Demon's Tilt	Action; pinball	Wiznwar	Flarb	Dec 13, 2019	Dec 13, 2019	Dec 13, 2019		
Dengeki Bunko: Fighting Climax Ignition	Fighting	Ecole Software	Sega	Dec 17, 2015	Unreleased	Unreleased		
Densha de Go!! Hashirou Yamanote Sen	Simulation	Taito	Square Enix	Dec 3, 2020	Unreleased	Unreleased	VR	
Deponia	Point-and-click adventure	Daedalic Entertainment	Daedalic Entertainment	Unreleased	Nov 15, 2016	Dec 1, 2016		
Deponia Doomsday	Point-and-click adventure	Daedalic Entertainment	Daedalic Entertainment	Unreleased	Feb 27, 2020	Feb 27, 2020		
Derelict Fleet	Action	Bionic Pony	Bionic Pony	Unreleased	Jul 7, 2017	Unreleased		
Descenders	Extreme sports	RageSquid	No More Robots	Nov 4, 2020	Aug 25, 2020	Aug 25, 2020		
Desperados III	Real-time strategy	Mimimi Productions	THQ Nordic	Aug 27, 2020	Jun 16, 2020	Jun 16, 2020		
Destiny	First-person shooter	Bungie	Activision	Sep 11, 2014	Sep 9, 2014	Sep 9, 2014		
Destiny 2	First-person shooter	Bungie	Activision	Sep 6, 2017	Sep 6, 2017	Sep 6, 2017		
Destiny Connect: Tick-Tock Travelers	Role-playing	Nippon Ichi Software	Nippon Ichi Software	Mar 14, 2019	Nov 5, 2019	Oct 25, 2019		
Destroy All Humans!	Action-adventure	Black Forest Games	THQ Nordic	Jul 28, 2020	Jul 28, 2020	Jul 28, 2020		
Detention	Survival horror	Red Candle Games	Coconut Island Games	Unreleased	Mar 1, 2017	Mar 1, 2018		
Detroit: Become Human	Interactive drama	Quantic Dream	Sony Computer Entertainment	May 25, 2018	May 25, 2018	May 25, 2018	P	
Deus Ex: Mankind Divided	First-person shooter, stealth	Eidos Montréal	Square Enix	Mar 23, 2017	Aug 23, 2016	Aug 23, 2016	P	
Devil Engine	Shoot 'em up	Dangen Entertainment	Dangen Entertainment	TBA	TBA	TBA		
Devil May Cry HD Collection	Action-adventure, hack and slash	Capcom	Capcom	Mar 13, 2018	Mar 13, 2018	Mar 13, 2018		
Devil May Cry 4: Special Edition	Action-adventure, hack and slash	Capcom	Capcom	Jun 18, 2015	Jun 23, 2015	Jun 24, 2015		
Devil May Cry 5	Action-adventure, hack and slash	Capcom	Capcom	Mar 8, 2019	Mar 8, 2019	Mar 8, 2019	P	
Devious Dungeon	Action platform	Woblyware; Ravenous	Ratalaika Games	Unreleased	Apr 24, 2018	Apr 25, 2018		
Devious Dungeon 2	Action platform	Woblyware	Ratalaika Games	Jul 5, 2019	May 14, 2019	May 15, 2019		
Dex	Acton role-playing	Lewis Chirenje	Dreadlocks Ltd	Nov 8, 2018	Jul 12, 2016	Feb 23, 2017		
Diablo II: Resurrected	Acton role-playing	Vicarious Visions	Blizzard Entertainment	Sep 21, 2021	Sep 21, 2021	Sep 21, 2021		
Diablo III	Action role-playing; hack and slash	Blizzard Entertainment	Blizzard Entertainment	Aug 19, 2014	Aug 19, 2014	Aug 19, 2014	P	
Diablo III: Reaper of Souls	Action role-playing; hack and slash	Blizzard Entertainment	Blizzard Entertainment	Aug 19, 2014	Aug 19, 2014	Aug 19, 2014		
Diablo IV	Action role-playing; hack and slash	Blizzard Entertainment	Blizzard Entertainment	Jun 5, 2023	Jun 5, 2023	Jun 5, 2023	P	
Die for Valhalla!	Hack and slash	Monster Couch	Monster Couch	Unreleased	May 29, 2018	May 29, 2018		
Digimon Story: Cyber Sleuth	Role-playing	Media.Vision	Bandai Namco	Dec 14, 2017	Feb 2, 2016	Feb 5, 2016		
Digimon Story: Cyber Sleuth – Hacker's Memory	Role-playing	Media.Vision	Bandai Namco Entertainment	Dec 14, 2017	Jan 19, 2018	Jan 19, 2018		
Digimon Survive	Visual novel; Role-playing	HYDE	Bandai Namco Entertainment	Jul 28, 2022	Jul 29, 2022	Jul 29, 2022		
Digimon World: Next Order	Role-playing	B.B. Studio	Bandai Namco Entertainment	Feb 16, 2017	Jan 31, 2017	Jan 27, 2017		
Dirt 4	Racing	Codemasters	Codemasters	Jun 9, 2017	Jun 9, 2017	Jun 9, 2017	P	
Dirt 5	Racing	Codemasters	Codemasters	Nov 6, 2020	Nov 6, 2020	Nov 6, 2020	CB P	
Dirt Rally	Racing	Codemasters	Codemasters	Unreleased	Apr 5, 2016	Apr 5, 2016	VR	
Dirt Rally 2.0	Racing	Codemasters	Codemasters	Apr 18, 2019	Feb 26, 2019	Feb 26, 2019	P	
Disaster Report 4 Plus: Summer Memories	Action-adventure	Granzella	Granzella	Nov 22, 2018	Apr 7, 2020	Apr 7, 2020		
Disc Jam	Action; sports	High Horse Entertainment	High Horse Entertainment	Unreleased	Mar 7, 2017	Mar 7, 2017	CP	
Disciples: Liberation	Turn-based strategy	Frima Studio	Kalypso Media	Oct 21, 2021	Oct 21, 2021	Oct 21, 2021		
Disco Elysium: The Final Cut	Role-playing	ZA/UM	ZA/UM	Mar 31, 2021	Mar 31, 2021	Mar 31, 2021		
Disgaea 1 Complete	Tactical role-playing	Nippon Ichi Software	Nippon Ichi Software	Jul 26, 2018	Oct 9, 2018	Oct 12, 2018	P	
Disgaea 4 Complete+	Tactical role-playing	Nippon Ichi Software	Nippon Ichi Software	Oct 29, 2019	Oct 29, 2019	Oct 29, 2019		
Disgaea 5 Complete	Tactical role-playing	Nippon Ichi Software	Nippon Ichi Software	Mar 26, 2015	Oct 6, 2015	Oct 16, 2015		
Disgaea 6: Defiance of Destiny	Tactical role-playing	Nippon Ichi Software	Nippon Ichi Software	Jan 28, 2021	Jun 28, 2022	Jun 28, 2022		
Disgaea 7: Vows of the Virtueless	Tactical role-playing	Nippon Ichi Software	Nippon Ichi Software	Jan 26, 2023	Oct 3, 2023	Oct 3, 2023	CB	
Dishonored: Definitive Edition	Action-adventure; stealth	Arkane Studios	Bethesda Softworks	Aug 27, 2015	Aug 25, 2015	Aug 28, 2015		
Dishonored 2	Action-adventure; stealth	Arkane Studios	Bethesda Softworks	Nov 11, 2016	Nov 11, 2016	Nov 11, 2016	P	
Dishonored: Death of the Outsider	Action-adventure; stealth	Arkane Studios	Bethesda Softworks	Sep 15, 2017	Sep 15, 2017	Sep 15, 2017		
Disintegration	First-person shooter	V1 Interactive	Private Division	Jun 16, 2020	Jun 16, 2020	Jun 16, 2020		
The Disney Afternoon Collection	Platform	Digital Eclipse	Capcom	Unreleased	Apr 18, 2017	Apr 18, 2017		
Disney Classic Games: Aladdin and The Lion King	Platform	Digital Eclipse	Disney Interactive	Unreleased	Oct 29, 2019	Oct 29, 2019		
Disney Dreamlight Valley	Life simulation, adventure	Gameloft Montreal	Gameloft	Dec 5, 2023	Dec 5, 2023	Dec 5, 2023		
Disney Infinity: Marvel Super Heroes	Action-adventure	Avalanche Software	Disney Interactive Studios	Unreleased	Sep 23, 2014	Sep 18, 2014		
Disney Infinity 3.0	Action-adventure	Avalanche Software	Disney Interactive Studios	Nov 12, 2015	Aug 28, 2015	Aug 28, 2015		
Dissidia Final Fantasy NT	Fighting	Team Ninja	Square Enix	Jan 11, 2018	Jan 30, 2018	Jan 30, 2018		
Distance	Racing	Refract Studios	Refract Studios	Unreleased	TBA	TBA	VR	
Distraint	Adventure	Jesse Makkonen	Ratalaika Games	Nov 14, 2019	Sep 10, 2019	Sep 11, 2019		
Distraint 2	Adventure	Jesse Makkonen	Ratalaika Games	Unreleased	Jul 10, 2020	Jul 10, 2020		
Divekick	Fighting	Iron Galaxy Studios	Iron Galaxy Studios	Oct 7, 2014	Oct 7, 2014	Oct 7, 2014	CP	
Divide	Action-adventure	Exploding Tuba Studios	Exploding Tuba Studios	Unreleased	Jan 31, 2017	Jan 31, 2017		
Divinity: Original Sin	Role-playing	Larian Studios	Focus Home Interactive	Apr 14, 2016	Oct 27, 2015	Oct 27, 2015		
Divinity: Original Sin II	Role-playing	Larian Studios	Larian Studios	Oct 31, 2019	Aug 31, 2018	Aug 31, 2018		
DJMax Respect	Music, rhythm	Rocky Studio	JP: Arc System Works; WW: Neowiz Games	Nov 9, 2017	Mar 6, 2018	Mar 17, 2018		
DmC: Devil May Cry Definitive Edition	Action-adventure, hack and slash	Ninja Theory	Capcom	Unreleased	Mar 10, 2015	Mar 10, 2015		
DNF Duel	Fighting	Arc System Works; Eighting; Neople	Nexon	Jun 28, 2022	Jun 28, 2022	Jun 28, 2022		
Doctor Who: The Edge of Reality	Adventure	Maze Theory	BBC Studios; Just Add Water	Unreleased	Sep 30, 2021	Sep 30, 2021		
Dodgeball Academia	Sports; role-playing	Pocket Trap	Humble Games	Aug 5, 2021	Aug 5, 2021	Aug 5, 2021		
Dogos	Shooter	Opqam	Opqam	Dec 16, 2016	Sep 6, 2016	Sep 6, 2016		
Dokapon Up! Mugen no Roulette	Board game	Sting	Aquaplus	Dec 10, 2020	Unreleased	Unreleased		
Doki Doki Literature Club Plus!	Visual novel	Team Salvato	JP: Playism; WW: Serenity Forge	Oct 6, 2021	Jun 30, 2021	Jun 30, 2021		
Doki-Doki Universe	Adventure	HumaNature Studios	HumaNature Studios	Feb 22, 2014	Dec 10, 2013	Dec 10, 2013		
Dollhouse	Adventure	Creazn Studio	Soedesco	Unreleased	May 24, 2019	May 24, 2019		
Do Not Feed the Monkeys	Adventure; life simulation	Fictiorama Studios	Badland Publishing	Unreleased	Sep 24, 2020	Sep 24, 2020		
Don Bradman Cricket 17	Sports	Big Ant Studios	Tru Blu Entertainment	Unreleased	Dec 16, 2016	Dec 16, 2016		
Don't Die, Mr. Robot!	Action	Infinite State Games	Infinite State Games	Unreleased	Mar 8, 2016	Mar 8, 2016		
Don't Starve	Survival	Klei Entertainment	505 Games	Feb 22, 2014	Jan 7, 2014	Jan 8, 2014		
Don't Starve Together	Survival	Klei Entertainment; BlitWorks	505 Games	Sep 13, 2017	Sep 13, 2017	Sep 13, 2017		
Donut County	Puzzle	Ben Esposito	Annapurna Interactive	Aug 28, 2018	Aug 28, 2018	Aug 28, 2018		
Doodle Devil	Puzzle	JoyBits	8Floor	Unreleased	Aug 16, 2016	Mar 23, 2016		
Doodle God	Puzzle	JoyBits	4Hit	Unreleased	Jul 5, 2016	Jan 29, 2016		
Doodle God Evolution	Puzzle	JoyBits	JoyBits	Unreleased	Oct 15, 2020	Oct 15, 2020		
Doom	First-person shooter	id Software	Bethesda Softworks	Unreleased	Jul 26, 2019	Jul 26, 2019		
Doom	First-person shooter	id Software	Bethesda Softworks	May 13, 2016	May 13, 2016	May 13, 2016	P	
Doom II	First-person shooter	id Software	Bethesda Softworks	Unreleased	Jul 26, 2019	Jul 26, 2019		
Doom 3	First-person shooter	id Software	Bethesda Softworks	Unreleased	Jul 26, 2019	Jul 26, 2019		
Doom 64	First-person shooter	id Software	Bethesda Softworks	Mar 26, 2020	Mar 20, 2020	Mar 20, 2020		
Doom Eternal	First-person shooter	id Software	Bethesda Softworks	Mar 20, 2020	Mar 20, 2020	Mar 20, 2020	CB P	
Door Kickers: Action Squad	Action; tactical	KillHouse Games; PixelShard	KillHouse Games	Apr 20, 2020	Oct 24, 2019	Oct 24, 2019		
Doraemon Story of Seasons	Farm simulation; role-playing	Brownies; Marvelous	Bandai Namco Entertainment	Jul 30, 2020	Sep 4, 2020	Sep 4, 2020		
Double Dragon Revive	Beat 'em up	Yuke's	Arc System Works	Oct 23, 2025	Oct 23, 2025	Oct 23, 2025		
Double Dragon Gaiden: Rise of the Dragons	Beat 'em up; Roguelike	Secret Base	Modus Games	Jul 27, 2023	Jul 27, 2023	Jul 27, 2023		
Doughlings: Arcade	Arcade	Hero Concept	Hero Concept	May 10, 2019	May 9, 2019	May 9, 2019		
Downwell	Platform, vertically scrolling shooter	Moppin	Devolver Digital	May 24, 2016	May 24, 2016	May 24, 2016		
Dragon Age: Inquisition	Role-playing	BioWare	Electronic Arts	Nov 27, 2014	Nov 18, 2014	Nov 21, 2014		
Dragon Ball FighterZ	Fighting	Arc System Works	Bandai Namco Entertainment	Feb 1, 2018	Jan 26, 2018	Jan 26, 2018		
Dragon Ball: The Breakers	Survival	Dimps	Bandai Namco Entertainment	Oct 12, 2022	Oct 14, 2022	Oct 13, 2022		
Dragon Ball Xenoverse	Fighting	Dimps	Bandai Namco Entertainment	Feb 5, 2015	Feb 24, 2015	Feb 13, 2015		
Dragon Ball Xenoverse 2	Fighting	Dimps	Bandai Namco Entertainment	Nov 2, 2016	Oct 25, 2016	Oct 28, 2016		
Dragon Ball Z: Kakarot	Action role-playing	CyberConnect2	Bandai Namco Entertainment	Jan 16, 2020	Jan 17, 2020	Jan 17, 2020		
Dragon Blaze	Shoot 'em up	Zerodiv	City Connection	Jun 29, 2022	Jun 29, 2022	Jun 29, 2022		
DragonFangZ: The Rose & Dungeon of Time	Role-playing; roguelike	Toydea	Toydea	Mar 29, 2018	May 29, 2019	Jun 10, 2019		
Dragon Fantasy: The Black Tome of Ice	Role-playing	Muteki Corporation	Muteki Corporation	Unreleased	Mar 22, 2016	Jun 21, 2016		
Dragon Fin Soup	Role-playing, roguelike	Grimm Bros	Grimm Bros	Dec 2, 2015	Nov 3, 2015	Nov 3, 2015		
Dragon's Crown Pro	Action role-playing, beat 'em up	Vanillaware	Atlus	Feb 8, 2018	May 15, 2018	May 15, 2018	CP P	
Dragon Marked For Death	Role-playing	Inti Creates	Inti Creates	Jul 22, 2020	Jul 22, 2020	Jul 22, 2020		
Dragon Quest Builders	Action role-playing; sandbox	Square Enix	Square Enix	Jan 28, 2016	Oct 11, 2016	Oct 14, 2016		
Dragon Quest Builders 2	Action role-playing; sandbox	Square Enix	Square Enix	Dec 20, 2018	Jul 12, 2019	Jul 12, 2019	CP	
Dragon Quest Heroes	Role-playing	Koei Tecmo	Square Enix	Feb 26, 2015	Oct 13, 2015	Oct 16, 2015		
Dragon Quest Heroes II	Role-playing	Koei Tecmo	Square Enix	May 27, 2016	Apr 25, 2017	Apr 28, 2017	CP P	
Dragon Quest X	Massively multiplayer online role-playing	Square Enix	Square Enix	Aug 17, 2017	Unreleased	Unreleased	CP	
Dragon Quest X Offline	Role-playing	Square Enix	Square Enix	Sep 15, 2022	Unreleased	Unreleased		
Dragon Quest XI	Role-playing	Square Enix	Square Enix	Jul 29, 2017	Sep 4, 2018	Sep 4, 2018	P	
Dragon Quest XI S: Echoes of an Elusive Age - Definitive Edition	Role-playing	Square Enix	Square Enix	Dec 4, 2020	Dec 4, 2020	Dec 4, 2020		
Dragon's Dogma: Dark Arisen	Action role-playing	Capcom	Capcom	Oct 5, 2017	Oct 3, 2017	Oct 3, 2017		
Dragon Star Varnir	Role-playing; turn-based	Compile Heart	NA: Idea Factory; EU: Reef	Oct 11, 2018	Jun 11, 2019	Jun 13, 2019		
Draugen	Adventure	Red Thread Games	Red Thread Games	Unreleased	Feb 21, 2020	Feb 21, 2020		
Draw a Stickman: Epic 2	Adventure; puzzle	Hitcents	Hitcents	Unreleased	Oct 16, 2019	Oct 15, 2019		
Drawful 2	Party, trivia	Jackbox Games	Jackbox Games	Unreleased	Jun 21, 2016	Jun 21, 2016		
Drawn to Death	Multiplayer online battle arena	Bartlet Jones	Sony Interactive Entertainment	Apr 4, 2017	Apr 4, 2017	Apr 4, 2017		
Dread Nautical	Tactical turn-based; role-playing	Zen Studios	Zen Studios	Unreleased	Apr 29, 2020	Apr 29, 2020		
Dreamfall Chapters: The Longest Journey	Adventure	Red Thread Games	Deep Silver	Unreleased	Mar 24, 2017	Mar 24, 2017	P	
Dreams	Game creation system	Media Molecule	Sony Interactive Entertainment	Feb 14, 2020	Feb 14, 2020	Feb 14, 2020	P VR	
Dreamwalker: Never Fall Asleep	Puzzle; hidden object	Artifex Mundi	Artifex Mundi	Unreleased	Dec 10, 2019	Dec 10, 2019		
Dreii	Puzzle	Etter Studio	bitforge	Unreleased	Mar 9, 2016	Mar 9, 2016	CP	
Driveclub	Racing	Evolution Studios	Sony Computer Entertainment	Oct 9, 2014	Oct 7, 2014	Oct 8, 2014		
Driveclub Bikes	Racing	Evolution Studios	Sony Computer Entertainment	Oct 29, 2015	Oct 27, 2015	Oct 27, 2015		
Dual Gear	Mech; turn-based strategy	Orbital Speed Studio	Corecell Technology	Unreleased	TBA	TBA		
Duck Dynasty	Hunting/fishing	Activision	Activision	Unreleased	Oct 14, 2014	Oct 14, 2014		
Duck Game	Action	Landon Podbielski	Adult Swim Games	Unreleased	Aug 22, 2017	Aug 22, 2017		
Duke Nukem 3D: 20th Anniversary World Tour	First-person shooter	Gearbox Software	Gearbox Software	Jul 5, 2017	Oct 11, 2016	Oct 11, 2016		
Dungeons 2	Strategy	Realmforge Studios	Kalypso Media	Feb 16, 2017	May 24, 2016	May 27, 2016		
Dungeons 3	Strategy	Realmforge Studios	Kalypso Media	May 31, 2018	Oct 17, 2017	Oct 13, 2017		
Dungeon Defenders: Awakened	Role-playing, tower defense	Chromatic Games	Chromatic Games	Unreleased	TBA	TBA		
Dungeon Encounters	Role-playing	Cattle Call	Square Enix	Oct 14, 2021	Oct 14, 2021	Oct 14, 2021		
Dungeon of the Endless	Roguelike; tower defense	Amplitude Studios	Playdigious	Unreleased	May 15, 2020	May 15, 2020		
Dungeon Punks	Beat 'em up	Hyper Awesome	Hyper Awesome	Unreleased	Jul 26, 2016	Jul 26, 2016		
Dungeon Village	Simulation	Kairosoft	Kairosoft	Dec 5, 2019	Unreleased	Unreleased		
DungeonTop	Roguelike deck-building	One Up Plus Entertainment	QubicGames	Unreleased	Dec 25, 2020	Dec 25, 2020		
Dungreed	Action; roguelike	Team Horay	Pikii	Sep 24, 2020	Oct 27, 2020	Oct 27, 2020		
Dusk Diver	Action role-playing	Jera Game Studio	JP: Justdan International; WW: PQube	Oct 24, 2019	Oct 29, 2019	Oct 25, 2019		
Dust: An Elysian Tail	Action role-playing	Humble Hearts	Humble Hearts	Nov 12, 2014	Oct 7, 2014	Oct 8, 2014		
Dustoff Heli Rescue 2	Action	Invictus Games	Rainy Frog	Dec 21, 2017	Dec 19, 2017	Dec 20, 2017		
Dustoff Z	Action	Invictus Games	Zordix	Unreleased	Nov 26, 2020	Nov 26, 2020		
The Dwarves	Role-playing	King Art Games	King Art Games	Unreleased	Dec 1, 2016	Dec 1, 2016		
Dying: 1983	Adventure	Nekcom	2P Games	TBA	TBA	TBA		
Dying Light	Action role-playing, survival horror	Techland	WB Games	Apr 16, 2015	Jan 27, 2015	Jan 30, 2015		
Dying Light 2: Stay Human	Action role-playing; survival horror	Techland	NA: Square Enix; WW: Techland	Dec 7, 2021	Dec 7, 2021	Dec 7, 2021		
Dynasty Warriors 8: Empires	Hack and slash	Omega Force	Tecmo Koei	Nov 20, 2014	Jan 30, 2015	Jan 30, 2015	CP	
Dynasty Warriors 8: Xtreme Legends Complete Edition	Action role-playing	Omega Force	Tecmo Koei	Feb 22, 2014	Mar 25, 2014	Apr 4, 2014		
Dynasty Warriors 9	Hack and slash	Omega Force	Koei Tecmo	Feb 8, 2018	Feb 13, 2018	Feb 13, 2018		
Dynasty Warriors 9: Empires	Hack and slash	Omega Force	Koei Tecmo	Dec 23, 2021	Feb 15, 2022	Feb 15, 2022		
Dynasty Warriors: Godseekers	Tactical role-playing	Omega Force	Tecmo Koei	Aug 3, 2016	Jan 31, 2017	Feb 1, 2017		
Dynasty Warriors Online	Hack and Slash	Koei Tecmo	Koei Tecmo	Sep 18, 2014	Unreleased	Unreleased		
Earth Atlantis	Shoot 'em up	Pixel Perfex	Headup Games	Jun 5, 2018	Jun 5, 2018	Jun 5, 2018		
Earth Defense Force 4.1	Third-person shooter	Sandlot	D3 Publisher	Apr 2, 2015	Dec 8, 2015	Feb 12, 2016		
Earth Defense Force 5	Third-person shooter	Sandlot	D3 Publisher	Dec 7, 2017	Dec 11, 2018	Dec 11, 2018		
Earth Defense Force 6	Third-person shooter	Sandlot	D3 Publisher	Aug 25, 2022	Unreleased	Unreleased		
Earth Defense Force: Iron Rain	Third-person shooter	Yuke's	D3 Publisher	Apr 11, 2019	Apr 11, 2019	Apr 11, 2019		
Earth Defense Force: World Brothers	Third-person shooter	Yuke's; Sandlot	D3 Publisher	Dec 24, 2020	May 27, 2021	May 27, 2021		
Earth Wars	Side-scroller	One or Eight	Rising Star Games	Sep 18, 2015	Nov 1, 2016	Oct 28, 2016		
Earthfall	First-person shooter	Holospark Games	Holospark Games	Jul 23, 2019	Jul 13, 2018	Jul 13, 2018	P	
Earthlock: Festival of Magic	Role-playing	Snowcastle Games	Snowcastle Games	Jan 27, 2017	Jan 27, 2017	Jan 27, 2017		
EarthNight	Action; platform	Cleaversoft	WW: Cleaversoft; JP: Intragames	Oct 1, 2020	Jan 23, 2020	Dec 3, 2019		
EA Sports FC 24	Sports	EA Vancouver	Electronic Arts	Sep 29, 2023	Sep 29, 2023	Sep 29, 2023		
EA Sports FC 25	Sports	EA Vancouver	Electronic Arts	Sep 27, 2024	Sep 27, 2024	Sep 27, 2024		
EA Sports FC 26	Sports	EA Vancouver	Electronic Arts	Sep 26, 2025	Sep 26, 2025	Sep 26, 2025		
EA Sports UFC	Fighting; sports	EA Canada	Electronic Arts	Nov 20, 2014	Jun 17, 2014	Jun 17, 2014		
EA Sports UFC 2	Fighting; sports	EA Canada	Electronic Arts	Aug 30, 2016	Mar 15, 2016	Mar 17, 2016		
EA Sports UFC 3	Fighting; sports	EA Canada	Electronic Arts	Feb 2, 2018	Feb 2, 2018	Feb 2, 2018		
EA Sports UFC 4	Fighting; sports	EA Canada	Electronic Arts	Aug 14, 2020	Aug 14, 2020	Aug 14, 2020		
Eastshade	Adventure	Eastshade Studios	Eastshade Studios	Unreleased	Oct 21, 2019	Oct 29, 2019		
Easy Dice for RPG/Tabletop	Party	SOURCE BYTE SPÓŁKA Z OGRANICZONĄ ODPOWIEDZIALNOŚCIĄ	SOURCE BYTE SPÓŁKA Z OGRANICZONĄ ODPOWIEDZIALNOŚCIĄ	Mar 31, 2024	Mar 31, 2024	Mar 31, 2024	P	
eBaseball Powerful Pro Yakyuu 2020	Sports	Konami	Konami	Jul 9, 2020	Unreleased	Unreleased	P VR	
eBaseball Powerful Pro Yakyuu 2022	Sports	Konami	Konami	Apr 21, 2022	Unreleased	Unreleased		
Echo	Action; stealth	Ultra Ultra	Ultra Ultra	Unreleased	Oct 11, 2017	Oct 11, 2017		
Edge of Eternity	Role-playing	Midgar Studio	Midgar Studio	Unreleased	Feb 10, 2022	Feb 10, 2022		
Edna & Harvey: Harvey's New Eyes	Point & click adventure	Daedalic Entertainment	Daedalic Entertainment	Unreleased	Aug 14, 2019	Aug 14, 2019		
Edna & Harvey: The Breakout	Point & click adventure	Daedalic Entertainment	Daedalic Entertainment	Unreleased	Jun 17, 2020	Jun 17, 2020		
Effie	Action-adventure; platform	Inverge Studios	Inverge Studios	Unreleased	Jun 4, 2019	Jun 4, 2019		
eFootball Pro Evolution Soccer 2020	Sports	PES Productions	Konami	Sep 10, 2019	Sep 10, 2019	Sep 10, 2019		
eFootball PES 2021 Season Update	Sports	PES Productions	Konami	Sep 17, 2020	Sep 15, 2020	Sep 15, 2020		
Eitr	Action role-playing	Eneme Entertainment	Devolver Digital	Unreleased	TBA	TBA		
Eiyuden Chronicle: Hundred Heroes	Role-playing	Rabbit & Bear Studios	505 Games	Apr 23, 2024	Apr 23, 2024	Apr 23, 2024		
Eiyuden Chronicle: Rising	Role-playing	Rabbit & Bear Studios	505 Games	May 10, 2022	May 10, 2022	May 10, 2022		
Elden Ring	Action role-playing	FromSoftware	Bandai Namco	Feb 25, 2022	Feb 25, 2022	Feb 25, 2022		
Elden Ring Nightreign	Action role-playing	FromSoftware	Bandai Namco Entertainment	May 30, 2025	May 30, 2025	May 30, 2025		
The Elder Scrolls Online	Massively multiplayer online role-playing	ZeniMax Online Studios	Bethesda Softworks	Jun 9, 2015	Jun 9, 2015	Jun 9, 2015	CB P	
The Elder Scrolls V: Skyrim – Special Edition	Action role-playing	Bethesda Game Studios	Bethesda Softworks	Oct 28, 2016	Oct 28, 2016	Oct 28, 2016	P VR	
Electronic Super Joy	Platform	Michael Todd Games	Loot Interactive	Unreleased	Jun 21, 2016	Jun 21, 2016		
Electronic Super Joy 2	Platform	Michael Todd Games	Severed Press	Unreleased	Oct 1, 2020	Oct 1, 2020		
ELEX	Action role-playing	Piranha Bytes	THQ Nordic	Unreleased	Oct 17, 2017	Oct 17, 2017		
ELEX II	Action role-playing	Piranha Bytes	THQ Nordic	Unreleased	Mar 1, 2022	Mar 1, 2022		
Elliot Quest	Platform-adventure, metroidvania	Ansimuz Games	Ansimuz Games	May 11, 2017	May 11, 2017	May 11, 2017		
Elite: Dangerous	Space trading and combat	Frontier Developments	Frontier Developments	Unreleased	Jun 27, 2017	Jun 27, 2017	P	
Embers of Mirrim	Platform	Creative Bytes	Creative Bytes	Unreleased	May 23, 2017	May 23, 2017		
Emily Wants to Play	Survival horror	Shawn Hitchcock	SKH Apps	Feb 9, 2017	Aug 9, 2016	Aug 9, 2016		
Empire of Angels IV	Tactical role-playing	Softstar Entertainment	EastAsiaSoft	Jun 23, 2021	Jun 23, 2021	Jun 23, 2021		
Empire of Sin	Role-playing; strategy	Romero Games	Paradox Interactive	Unreleased	Dec 1, 2020	Dec 1, 2020		
Enchanted Portals	Shoot 'em up; run and gun	Xixo Game Studio	Xixo Game Studio	Nov 1, 2023	Nov 1, 2023	Nov 1, 2023		
Ender Lilies: Quietus of the Knights	Metroidvania	Live Wire; Adglobe	Binary Haze Interactive	Jul 20, 2021	Jul 20, 2021	Jul 20, 2021		
The End Is Nigh	Adventure, platform	Edmund McMillen	Nicalis	Unreleased	Apr 30, 2019	Apr 30, 2019		
Endless Dungeon	Action role-playing; strategy	Amplitude Studios	Sega	May 18, 2023	May 18, 2023	May 18, 2023		
Endless Fables: Dark Moor	Puzzle; hidden object	Artifex Mundi	Artifex Mundi	Unreleased	Jun 16, 2020	Jun 16, 2020		
Energy Hook	Action-adventure	Happion Labs	Happion Labs	Unreleased	Jul 5, 2016	Jul 5, 2016		
Enigmatis: The Ghosts of Maple Creek	Puzzle; hidden object	Artifex Mundi	Artifex Mundi	Unreleased	Jan 24, 2017	Jan 24, 2017		
Enigmatis 2: The Mists of Ravenwood	Puzzle; hidden object	Artifex Mundi	Artifex Mundi	Unreleased	May 30, 2017	May 30, 2017		
Enigmatis 3: The Shadow of Karkhala	Puzzle; hidden object	Artifex Mundi	Artifex Mundi	Unreleased	Apr 6, 2018	Apr 6, 2018		
Enter the Gungeon	Bullet hell; roguelike	Dodge Roll	Devolver Digital	Apr 20, 2016	Apr 5, 2016	Apr 5, 2016		
Entwined	Action-adventure	Pixelopus	Sony Computer Entertainment	Jun 19, 2014	Jun 9, 2014	Jun 9, 2014		
Epic Astro Story	Simulation	Kairosoft	Kairosoft	Oct 29, 2020	Nov 12, 2020	Nov 12, 2020		
Epic Mickey: Rebrushed	Platform; Action-adventure	Purple Lamb	THQ Nordic	Sep 24, 2024	Sep 24, 2024	Sep 24, 2024		
Erica	Interactive drama	Flavourworks	Sony Interactive Entertainment	Unreleased	Aug 20, 2019	Aug 20, 2019	PL	
Escape Plan	Puzzle	Fun Bits Interactive	Sony Computer Entertainment	Feb 22, 2014	Dec 3, 2013	Nov 29, 2013		
Escape Goat 2	Platform, puzzle	MagicalTimeBean	Double Fine Productions	Unreleased	Oct 21, 2014	Nov 26, 2014		
The Escapists	Strategy; role-playing	Mouldy Toof Studios	Team17	Unreleased	Jun 2, 2015	May 29, 2015		
The Escapists 2	Strategy; role-playing	Mouldy Toof Studios	Team17	Unreleased	Aug 22, 2017	Aug 22, 2017		
The Escapists: The Walking Dead	Strategy; role-playing	Mouldy Toof Studios	Team17	Unreleased	Feb 16, 2016	Feb 16, 2016		
Eschatos	Shoot 'em up	Qute Corporation	Qute Corporation	Apr 7, 2022	Apr 7, 2022	Apr 7, 2022		
ESP Ra.De. Psi	Shoot 'em up	Cave; M2	M2	Dec 19, 2019	Unreleased	Unreleased		
ESports Life Tycoon	Simulation	U-Play Online	Raiser Games	Unreleased	Nov 12, 2020	Nov 12, 2020		
Eternights	Adventure, puzzle	Studio Sai	Studio Sai	Unreleased	Nov 16, 2023	Nov 16, 2023	CP	
Ether One	Adventure, puzzle	White Paper Games	White Paper Games	Unreleased	May 5, 2015	May 5, 2015		
Etherborn	Platform	Altered Matter	Altered Matter	Oct 3, 2019	Jul 18, 2019	Jul 18, 2019		
Euro Fishing	Simulation	Dovetail Games	Dovetail Games	Unreleased	Apr 11, 2017	Apr 11, 2017		
Evan's Remains	Puzzle adventure	Matías Schmied	Whitethorn Digital	Unreleased	Jun 11, 2020	Jul 31, 2020		
Eve: Valkyrie - Warzone	Space Shooter	CCP Games	CCP Games	Unreleased	Sep 26, 2017	Sep 26, 2017	CP VR	
Even the Ocean	Action-adventure; platform	Analgesic Productions	Ratalaika Games	Unreleased	Aug 18, 2020	Aug 19, 2020		
Eventide: Slavic Fable	Puzzle; hidden object	Artifex Mundi	Artifex Mundi	Unreleased	Apr 25, 2017	Apr 25, 2017		
Eventide 2: Sorcerer's Mirror	Puzzle; hidden object	Artifex Mundi	Artifex Mundi	Unreleased	Sep 26, 2017	Sep 26, 2017		
Eventide 3: Legacy of Legends	Puzzle; hidden object	Artifex Mundi	Artifex Mundi	Unreleased	Jun 29, 2018	Jun 29, 2018		
Ever Forward	Puzzle adventure	Pathea Games	PM Studios	Mar 28, 2022	Aug 10, 2021	Aug 10, 2021		
Evergate	Puzzle-platform	Stone Lantern Games	PQube	TBA	TBA	TBA		
Everspace	Shooter	Rockfish Games	BadLand Games	Feb 13, 2019	May 29, 2018	May 29, 2018	P	
Evertried	Rougelike	Lunic Games	Dangen Entertainment	Oct 20, 2021	Oct 21, 2021	Oct 21, 2021		
Everybody's Golf	Sports	Clap Hanz	Sony Computer Entertainment	Aug 31, 2017	Aug 29, 2017	Aug 30, 2017	P	
Everybody's Gone to the Rapture	Adventure	The Chinese Room	Sony Computer Entertainment	Aug 11, 2015	Aug 11, 2015	Aug 11, 2015		
Everything	Adventure	David OReilly	Double Fine Productions	Feb 13, 2020	Mar 21, 2017	Mar 21, 2017		
Evil Dead: The Game	Survival horror	Boss Team Games	Saber Interactive	May 13, 2022	May 13, 2022	May 13, 2022		
Evil Genius 2: World Domination	Real-time strategy; simulation	Rebellion Developments	Rebellion Developments	Unreleased	Nov 30, 2021	Nov 30, 2021		
Evil West	Action-adventure	Flying Wild Hog	Focus Home Interactive	Nov 22, 2022	Nov 22, 2022	Nov 22, 2022		
The Evil Within	Survival horror	Tango Gameworks	Bethesda Softworks	Oct 23, 2014	Oct 14, 2014	Oct 17, 2014		
The Evil Within 2	Survival horror	Tango Gameworks	Bethesda Softworks	Oct 19, 2017	Oct 13, 2017	Oct 13, 2017	P	
Evolve	First-person shooter	Turtle Rock Studios	2K Games	Mar 5, 2015	Feb 10, 2015	Feb 10, 2015		
Evotinction	Action-adventure	Spikewave Games	Spikewave Games	TBA	TBA	TBA		
Exception	Action; platform	Traxmaster Software	Traxmaster Software	Unreleased	Aug 14, 2019	Aug 13, 2019		
Exile's End	Action	Magnetic Realms	Xseed Games	Unreleased	Oct 25, 2016	Oct 26, 2016		
Exist Archive	Role-playing	Tri-Ace	Spike Chunsoft	Dec 17, 2015	Oct 18, 2016	Oct 18, 2016		
The Exit 8	Walking sim	Kotake Create	Playism	Aug 8, 2024	Aug 8, 2024	Aug 8, 2024		
Exit the Gungeon	Bullet hell; roguelike	Dodge Roll Games	Devolver Digital	Nov 13, 2020	Nov 13, 2020	Nov 13, 2020		
Extinction	Action-adventure	Iron Galaxy Studios	Maximum Games	Unreleased	Apr 10, 2018	Apr 10, 2018		
Exophobia	First-person shooter	Zarc Attack	PM Studios	Unreleased	Jul 23, 2024	Jul 23, 2024		
Expeditions: A MudRunner Game	Vehicle simulation	Saber Interactive	Focus Entertainment	Mar 5, 2024	Mar 5, 2024	Mar 5, 2024		
ExZeus: The Complete Collection	Rail shooter	Sickhead Games	Zigguat Interactive	Sep 30, 2021	Sep 30, 2021	Sep 30, 2021		
F1 2015	Racing	Codemasters	Codemasters	Jun 10, 2015	Jul 30, 2015	Jun 21, 2015		
F1 2016	Racing	Codemasters	Codemasters	Aug 19, 2016	Aug 19, 2016	Aug 19, 2016		
F1 2017	Racing	Codemasters	Codemasters	Aug 25, 2017	Aug 25, 2017	Aug 25, 2017	P	
F1 2018	Racing	Codemasters	Codemasters	Aug 24, 2018	Aug 24, 2018	Aug 24, 2018	P	
F1 2019	Racing	Codemasters	Codemasters	Jun 28, 2019	Jun 28, 2019	Jun 28, 2019	P	
F1 2020	Racing	Codemasters	Codemasters	Jul 10, 2020	Jul 10, 2020	Jul 10, 2020	P	
F1 2021	Racing	Codemasters	Electronic Arts	Jul 16, 2021	Jul 16, 2021	Jul 16, 2021	P	
F1 22	Racing	Codemasters	Electronic Arts	Jul 1, 2022	Jul 1, 2022	Jul 1, 2022	P	
F1 23	Racing	Codemasters	Electronic Arts	Jun 16, 2023	Jun 16, 2023	Jun 16, 2023	P	
F1 24	Racing	Codemasters	Electronic Arts	May 31, 2024	May 31, 2024	May 31, 2024	P	
F1 Manager 2022	Racing management	Frontier Developments	Frontier Developments	Aug 30, 2022	Aug 30, 2022	Aug 30, 2022		
F1 Manager 2023	Racing management	Frontier Developments	Frontier Developments	Jul 31, 2023	Jul 31, 2023	Jul 31, 2023		
F1 Manager 2024	Racing management	Frontier Developments	Frontier Developments	Jul 23, 2024	Jul 23, 2024	Jul 23, 2024		
Faeria	Collectible card; turn-based strategy	Abrakam	Versus Evil	Unreleased	Nov 3, 2020	Nov 3, 2020	CP	
Fairy Fencer F: Advent Dark Force	Japanese role-playing	Compile Heart	Idea Factory	Nov 5, 2015	Jul 26, 2016	Jul 29, 2016		
Fairy Tail	Role-playing	Gust Co. Ltd.	Koei Tecmo	Jul 30, 2020	Jul 31, 2020	Jul 30, 2020		
The Falconeer: Warrior Edition	Aerial combat	Tomas Sala	Wired Productions	Aug 5, 2021	Aug 5, 2021	Aug 5, 2021		
The Fall	Action-adventure; platform	Over the Moon	Over the Moon	Unreleased	Jul 14, 2015	Jul 14, 2015		
The Fall Part 2: Unbound	Action-adventure; platform	Over the Moon	Over the Moon	Unreleased	Feb 13, 2018	Feb 13, 2018		
Fall Guys: Ultimate Knockout	Battle royale; obstacle racing	Mediatonic	Devolver Digital	Aug 4, 2020	Aug 4, 2020	Aug 4, 2020	CP P	
Fallen Legion: Revenants	Action role-playing	Yummy Yummy Tummy	NIS America	Unreleased	Feb 19, 2021	Feb 16, 2021		
Fallen Legion: Sins of an Empire	Action role-playing	Yummy Yummy Tummy	Acttil	Jan 31, 2018	Jul 25, 2017	Jul 25, 2017		
Fallout 4	Action role-playing	Bethesda Game Studios	Bethesda Softworks	Dec 17, 2015	Nov 10, 2015	Nov 10, 2015	P	
Fallout 76	Action role-playing	Bethesda Game Studios	Bethesda Softworks	Nov 14, 2018	Nov 14, 2018	Nov 14, 2018		
Family Feud	Quiz	_Misc	Ubisoft	Unreleased	Nov 12, 2020	Nov 12, 2020		
Family Mysteries: Poisonous Promises	Puzzle; hidden object	Brave Giant	Artifex Mundi	Unreleased	Jul 31, 2020	Jul 31, 2020		
Family Mysteries 2: Echoes of Tomorrow	Puzzle; hidden object	Brave Giant	Artifex Mundi	Unreleased	Oct 30, 2020	Oct 30, 2020		
Fantasy General II	Turn-based strategy	Owned by Gravity	Slitherine Software	Unreleased	Jul 31, 2020	Jul 31, 2020		
Fantasy Life i: The Girl Who Steals Time	Life simulation; role-playing	Level-5	Level-5	May 21, 2025	May 21, 2025	May 21, 2025		
Far Cry 3 Classic	First-person shooter	Ubisoft Montreal	Ubisoft	Unreleased	Jun 26, 2018	Jun 26, 2018		
Far Cry 3 Blood Dragon Classic Edition	First-person shooter	Ubisoft Montreal	Ubisoft	Unreleased	Dec 16, 2021	Dec 16, 2021		
Far Cry 4	First-person shooter	Ubisoft Montreal	Ubisoft	Jan 22, 2015	Nov 18, 2014	Nov 20, 2014		
Far Cry 5	First-person shooter	Ubisoft Montreal	Ubisoft	Mar 29, 2018	Mar 27, 2018	Mar 27, 2018	P	
Far Cry 6	First-person shooter	Ubisoft Toronto	Ubisoft	Oct 7, 2021	Oct 7, 2021	Oct 7, 2021	CB P	
Far Cry Primal	Action-adventure	Ubisoft Montreal	Ubisoft	Mar 24, 2016	Feb 23, 2016	Feb 23, 2016		
Far: Lone Sails	Adventure	Mr. Whale's Game Service	Mixtvision	May 23, 2019	Apr 2, 2019	Apr 2, 2019		
Farming Simulator 15	Simulation	Giants Software	Focus Home Interactive	Nov 26, 2015	May 19, 2015	May 21, 2015		
Farming Simulator 17	Simulation	Giants Software	Focus Home Interactive	Mar 23, 2017	Oct 24, 2016	Oct 24, 2016	P	
Farming Simulator 19	Simulation	Giants Software	Focus Home Interactive	Feb 7, 2019	Nov 20, 2018	Nov 20, 2018		
Farming Simulator 22	Simulation	Giants Software	Focus Home Interactive	Nov 22, 2021	Nov 22, 2021	Nov 22, 2021		
Farm Together	Simulation; strategy	Milkstone Studios	Milkstone Studios	Unreleased	Feb 20, 2019	Feb 25, 2019		
Fast & Furious Crossroads	Racing	Slightly Mad Studios	Bandai Namco Entertainment	Unreleased	Aug 7, 2020	Aug 7, 2020		
Fast Striker	Shoot 'em up	NGDEV	EastAsiaSoft	Oct 19, 2018	Oct 16, 2018	Oct 17, 2018		
Fatal Frame: Maiden of Black Water	Survival horror	Koei Tecmo	Koei Tecmo	Oct 28, 2021	Oct 28, 2021	Oct 28, 2021		
Fatal Fury: City of the Wolves	Fighting	SNK	SNK	Apr 24, 2025	Apr 24, 2025	Apr 24, 2025		
Fate/Extella Link	Action	Marvelous Interactive	Marvelous Interactive	Jun 7, 2018	Mar 19, 2019	Mar 22, 2019		
Fate/Extella: The Umbral Star	Action	Marvelous	Marvelous	Nov 10, 2016	Jan 17, 2017	Jan 20, 2017	P	
Fat Princess Adventures	Action-adv, hack and slash	Fun Bits Interactive	Sony Computer Entertainment	Dec 5, 2015	Dec 5, 2015	Dec 5, 2015		
Fault Milestone One	Visual novel	Alice in Dissonance	Sekai Project	May 29, 2020	May 22, 2020	May 22, 2020		
Fault Milestone Two Side: Above	Visual novel	Alice in Dissonance	Phoenixx	Aug 16, 2015	Sep 8, 2015	Sep 8, 2015		
Fault Milestone Two Side: Below	Visual novel	Alice in Dissonance	Sekai Project	TBA	TBA	TBA		
Fe	Adventure	Zoink	Electronic Arts	Feb 16, 2018	Feb 16, 2018	Feb 16, 2018	P	
Fear Effect Sedna	Role-playing; third-person shooter	Sushee	Forever Entertainment	Mar 6, 2018	Mar 6, 2018	Mar 6, 2018		
Feist	Platform, puzzle	Bits & Beasts	Finji Games	Unreleased	Dec 13, 2016	Dec 16, 2016		
Felix the Reaper	Puzzle	Kong Orange	Daedalic Entertainment	Unreleased	Oct 17, 2019	Oct 18, 2019		
Fell Seal: Arbiter's Mark	Tactical role-playing	6 Eyes Studio	1C Company	Unreleased	Apr 30, 2019	Apr 30, 2019		
Fenix Furia	Platform	Green Lava Studios	Green Lava Studios	Sep 16, 2016	Jun 7, 2016	Jun 7, 2016		
Feudal Alloy	Metroidvania	Attu Games	JP: Rainy Frog; WW: Attu Games	Aug 1, 2019	May 14, 2019	May 16, 2019		
Fez	Platform, puzzle	Polytron Corporation	Polytron Corporation	Aug 20, 2014	Mar 25, 2014	Mar 26, 2014	3D	
FIA European Truck Racing Championship	Racing	N-Racing	Bigben Interactive	Oct 31, 2019	Sep 5, 2019	Aug 1, 2019		
Fibbage	Party, trivia	Jackbox Games	Jackbox Games	Unreleased	Sep 16, 2014	Unreleased		
FIFA 14	Sports	EA Canada	Electronic Arts	Feb 22, 2014	Nov 15, 2013	Nov 29, 2013		
FIFA 15	Sports	EA Canada	Electronic Arts	Oct 9, 2014	Sep 25, 2014	Sep 23, 2014		
FIFA 16	Sports	EA Canada	Electronic Arts	Oct 18, 2015	Sep 22, 2015	Sep 24, 2015		
FIFA 17	Sports	EA Canada	Electronic Arts	Sep 29, 2016	Sep 27, 2016	Sep 29, 2016	P	
FIFA 18	Sports	EA Canada	Electronic Arts	Sep 29, 2017	Sep 29, 2017	Sep 29, 2017	P	
FIFA 19	Sports	EA Vancouver	Electronic Arts	Sep 28, 2018	Sep 28, 2018	Sep 28, 2018		
FIFA 20	Sports	EA Vancouver	Electronic Arts	Sep 27, 2019	Sep 27, 2019	Sep 27, 2019		
FIFA 21	Sports	EA Vancouver	Electronic Arts	Oct 9, 2020	Oct 9, 2020	Oct 9, 2020		
FIFA 22	Sports	EA Vancouver	Electronic Arts	Oct 1, 2021	Oct 1, 2021	Oct 1, 2021		
FIFA 23	Sports	EA Vancouver	Electronic Arts	Sep 30, 2022	Sep 30, 2022	Sep 30, 2022		
Fighting EX Layer	Fighting	Arika	Arika	Jun 28, 2018	Jun 28, 2018	Jun 28, 2018		
Fight'N Rage	Fighting	Seba Games Dev; BlitWorks	BlitWorks	Sep 10, 2020	Dec 3, 2019	Dec 3, 2019		
Figment	Adventure; puzzle	Bedtime Digital	Bedtime Digital	Apr 25, 2019	May 14, 2019	May 14, 2019		
Filthy Lucre	Action; stealth	Fabrik Games	Fabrik Games	Unreleased	Sep 16, 2016	Sep 7, 2016	VR	
Final Fantasy VII	Action role-playing	Square Enix	Square Enix	Dec 6, 2015	Dec 5, 2015	Dec 5, 2015		
Final Fantasy VII Remake	Action role-playing	Square Enix	Square Enix	Apr 10, 2020	Apr 10, 2020	Apr 10, 2020	P	
Final Fantasy VIII Remastered	Action role-playing	Square Enix	Square Enix	Sep 3, 2019	Sep 3, 2019	Sep 3, 2019	P	
Final Fantasy IX	Action role-playing	Square Enix	Square Enix	Sep 19, 2017	Sep 19, 2017	Sep 19, 2017		
Final Fantasy X/X-2 HD Remaster	Action role-playing	Square Enix	Square Enix	May 14, 2015	May 12, 2015	May 15, 2015	P	
Final Fantasy XII: The Zodiac Age	Action role-playing	Square Enix	Square Enix	Jul 13, 2017	Jul 11, 2017	Jul 11, 2017	P	
Final Fantasy XIV: A Realm Reborn	Massively multiplayer online role-playing	Square Enix	Square Enix	Apr 14, 2014	Apr 14, 2014	Apr 14, 2014	CP VR	
Final Fantasy XIV: Heavensward	Massively multiplayer online role-playing	Square Enix	Square Enix	Jun 23, 2015	Jun 23, 2015	Jun 23, 2015		
Final Fantasy XIV: Stormblood	Massively multiplayer online role-playing	Square Enix	Square Enix	Jun 20, 2017	Jun 20, 2017	Jun 20, 2017		
Final Fantasy XIV: Shadowbringers	Massively multiplayer online role-playing	Square Enix	Square Enix	Jun 28, 2019	Jun 28, 2019	Jun 28, 2019		
Final Fantasy XV	Action role-playing	Square Enix	Square Enix	Nov 29, 2016	Nov 29, 2016	Nov 29, 2016	P VR	
Final Fantasy: Crystal Chronicles Remastered	Action role-playing	Square Enix	Square Enix	Aug 27, 2020	Aug 27, 2020	Aug 27, 2020	CP	
Final Fantasy Type-0 HD	Action role-playing	Square Enix	Square Enix	Mar 19, 2015	Mar 17, 2015	Mar 20, 2015		
Final Horizon	Tower defense	Eiconic Games	Eiconic Games	Jan 14, 2015	Dec 4, 2014	Dec 5, 2014		
The Final Station	Platform	Do My Best	TinyBuild	Unreleased	Aug 30, 2016	Sep 6, 2016		
Fire Pro Wrestling World	Sports	Spike Chunsoft	Spike Chunsoft	Aug 9, 2018	Aug 28, 2018	Sep 28, 2018		
Firewatch	Adventure	Campo Santo	Campo Santo	Feb 9, 2016	Feb 9, 2016	Feb 9, 2016	P	
Fishing: Barents Sea	Sports	Misc Games	Astragon	Dec 25, 2019	Dec 13, 2019	Dec 13, 2019		
Fishing Sim World: Pro Tour	Simulation	Dovetail Games	Dovetail Games	Unreleased	Sep 18, 2018	Sep 18, 2018		
F.I.S.T.: Forged In Shadow Torch	Action-adventure	TiGames	Bilibili	Sep 7, 2021	Sep 7, 2021	Sep 7, 2021		
Fist of the North Star: Lost Paradise	Action-adventure	Sega CS1	Sega	Mar 8, 2018	Oct 2, 2018	Oct 2, 2018	P	
Five Dates	Interactive fiction	Good Gate Media	Wales Interactive	Unreleased	Nov 17, 2020	Nov 17, 2020		
Five Nights at Freddy's	Survival horror	Clickteam	Steel Wool	Unreleased	Nov 29, 2019	Nov 29, 2019		
Five Nights at Freddy's 2	Survival horror	Clickteam	Steel Wool	Unreleased	Nov 29, 2019	Nov 29, 2019		
Five Nights at Freddy's 3	Survival horror	Clickteam	Steel Wool	Unreleased	Nov 29, 2019	Nov 29, 2019		
Five Nights at Freddy's 4	Survival horror	Clickteam	Steel Wool	Unreleased	Nov 29, 2019	Nov 29, 2019		
Five Nights at Freddy's: Help Wanted	Survival horror	Clickteam	Steel Wool	Dec 20, 2019	May 28, 2019	May 28, 2019	VR	
Five Nights at Freddy's: Security Breach	Survival horror	Steel Wool Studios	ScottGames	Dec 16, 2021	Dec 16, 2021	Dec 16, 2021		
Five Nights at Freddy's: Into the Pit	Horror, adventure	Mega Cat Studios	Mega Cat Studios	Sep 27, 2024	Sep 27, 2024	Sep 27, 2024		
Five Nights at Freddy's: Sister Location	Survival horror	Clickteam	Clickteam	Unreleased	Jul 22, 2020	Jul 21, 2020		
The Flame in the Flood	Roguelike, survival	The Molasses Flood	Curve Digital	Jan 17, 2017	Jan 17, 2017	Jan 17, 2017		
Flame Over	Action	Laughing Jackal	Laughing Jackal	Unreleased	Sep 15, 2015	Sep 16, 2015		
Flashback	Action-adventure	Microids	Microids	Unreleased	Nov 20, 2018	Nov 20, 2018		
Flat Heroes	Action	Parallel Circles	Deck13	Jan 14, 2020	Jan 14, 2020	Jan 14, 2020		
FlatOut 4: Total Insanity	Racing	Kylotonn	Strategy First	Aug 31, 2017	Mar 17, 2017	Mar 17, 2017	P	
Flinthook	Action; platform	Tribute Games	Tribute Games	Apr 14, 2017	Apr 14, 2017	Apr 14, 2017		
Flipper Mechanic	Simulation	SimFabric	SimFabric	Unreleased	TBA	TBA		
Flipping Death	Adventure	Zoink	Zoink	Aug 7, 2018	Aug 7, 2018	Aug 7, 2018		
Flockers	Puzzle-platform	Team17	Team17	Sep 19, 2014	Sep 23, 2014	Sep 19, 2014		
Flow	Life simulation	SuperVillain Studios	Sony Computer Entertainment	Feb 22, 2014	Dec 17, 2013	Nov 29, 2013		
Flower	Adventure	Bluepoint Games	Sony Computer Entertainment	Feb 22, 2014	Nov 15, 2013	Nov 29, 2013		
Fluster Cluck	Party	Loot Interactive	Loot Interactive	Oct 14, 2017	Oct 14, 2017	Oct 14, 2017		
Fobia: St. Dinfra Hotel	Psychological horror	Pulsatrix Studios	Maximum Games	Jun 28, 2022	Jun 28, 2022	Jun 28, 2022		
Football, Tactics & Glory	Sports; strategy; turn-based	Creoteam	Toplitz Productions	Unreleased	Jan 22, 2020	Jan 22, 2020		
Forager	Adventure	HopFrog	Humble Bundle	Jul 31, 2019	Jul 30, 2019	Jul 30, 2019		
Forced	Action role-playing	BetaDwarf	BetaDwarf	Feb 22, 2014	Nov 15, 2013	Nov 29, 2013		
Foreclosed	Shooter	Antab Studio	Merge Games	Unreleased	Aug 12, 2021	Aug 12, 2021		
Foregone	Action; platform	Big Blue Bubble	Big Blue Bubble	Unreleased	Oct 5, 2020	Oct 13, 2020		
For Honor	Adventure	Ubisoft Montreal	Ubisoft	Feb 16, 2017	Feb 14, 2017	Feb 14, 2017	CB P	
The Forest	Survival adventure	SKS Games	SKS Games	Nov 6, 2018	Nov 6, 2018	Nov 6, 2018	P	
Forgotton Anne	Adventure	ThroughLine Games	Square Enix Collective	Feb 28, 2019	May 15, 2018	May 15, 2018		
Forma.8	Action-adventure	MixedBag	MixedBag	Sep 28, 2017	Feb 28, 2017	Feb 28, 2017	P	
For the King	Action role-playing	IronOak Games	IronOak Games	Unreleased	May 7, 2019	May 7, 2019		
Foul Play	Action-adv, beat 'em up	Mediatonic	Devolver Digital	Unreleased	Sep 1, 2015	Feb 23, 2016		
Four Sided Fantasy	Platform, puzzle	Ludo Land	Serenity Forge	Unreleased	Aug 30, 2016	Aug 31, 2016		
Fractured Minds	Adventure	Emily Mitchell	Wired Productions Limited	Jan 31, 2019	Jan 31, 2019	Jan 31, 2019		
Fragments of Him	Adventure	Sassybot	Sassybot	Unreleased	Sep 26, 2017	Sep 26, 2017		
Frane: Dragons' Odyssey	Action role-playing	Exe Create	Kemco	Apr 5, 2019	May 7, 2019	Unreleased		
Frantics	Party	NapNok Games	NapNok Games	Unreleased	Mar 6, 2018	Mar 7, 2018	PL	
FreakOut: Calamity TV Show	Twin-stick shooter	Immaterial Games	JanduSoft	Nov 11, 2020	Apr 17, 2020	Apr 17, 2020		
Freddy Spaghetti	Action-adventure; simulation	Playful Pasta	Ratalaika Games	Dec 16, 2020	Dec 15, 2020	Dec 16, 2020	CB	
Freedom Finger	Shoot 'em up	Wide Right Interactive	Wide Right Interactive	Jul 22, 2020	Mar 24, 2020	Mar 24, 2020		
Freedom Planet	Platform	GalaxyTrail	GalaxyTrail	Aug 30, 2018	Aug 25, 2017	Mar 21, 2017		
Freedom Planet 2	Platform	GalaxyTrail	GalaxyTrail	Apr 4, 2024	Apr 4, 2024	Apr 4, 2024		
Friday the 13th: The Game	Survival horror	Gun Media	IllFonic	Aug 2, 2018	May 26, 2017	May 26, 2017		
Frostpunk	City-building; survival	11 Bit Studios	11 Bit Studios	Feb 27, 2020	Oct 11, 2019	Oct 11, 2019	P	
Front Mission 2: Remake	Tactical role-playing game	Storm Trident	Forever Entertainment	Apr 30, 2024	Apr 30, 2024	Apr 30, 2024		
Fuga: Melodies of Steel	Role-playing; strategy	CyberConnect2	Cyberconnect2	Jul 29, 2021	Jul 29, 2021	Jul 29, 2021		
Fuga: Melodies of Steel 2	Role-playing; strategy	CyberConnect2	Cyberconnect2	May 11, 2023	May 11, 2023	May 11, 2023		
Fuga: Melodies of Steel 3	Tactical role-playing	CyberConnect2	CyberConnect2	May 23, 2025	May 23, 2025	May 23, 2025		
Full Metal Panic! Fight! Who Dares Wins	Role-playing; strategy	B.B. Studio	Bandai Namco Entertainment	May 31, 2018	Unreleased	Unreleased		
Full Mojo Rampage	Action role-playing	Over The Top Games	Nicalis	Unreleased	Jun 28, 2016	Jun 28, 2016		
Full Throttle Remastered	Graphic adventure	Double Fine Productions	Double Fine Productions	Unreleased	Apr 18, 2017	Apr 18, 2017	P	
Funko Fusion	Action-adventure	10:10 Games	10:10 Games	Nov 15, 2024	Nov 15, 2024	Nov 15, 2024		
Furi	Action, shoot 'em up	The Game Bakers	The Game Bakers	Aug 3, 2016	Jul 5, 2016	Jul 5, 2016		
Fury Unleashed	Action; platform	Awesome Games	Awesome Games	Oct 28, 2021	May 8, 2020	May 8, 2020		
Fuser	Rhythm	Harmonix	NCSoft	Unreleased	Nov 10, 2020	Nov 10, 2020		
Fushigi no Gensōkyō 3	Dōjin	Aqua Style	Mediascape	TBA	TBA	TBA		
Future Unfolding	Adventure, puzzle	Spaces of Play	Spaces of Play	May 16, 2017	May 16, 2017	May 16, 2017		
FutureGrind	Action	Milkbag Games	Milkbag Games	Unreleased	Jan 22, 2019	Jan 22, 2019		
Futuridium EP Deluxe	Shooter, puzzle	MixedBag	MixedBag	Unreleased	Oct 1, 2014	Sep 30, 2014	VR	
Fuuraiki 4	Adventure	FOG Inc.	Nippon Ichi Software	Jul 8, 2021	Unreleased	Unreleased		
Fuyu Kiss	Visual novel	Giga	Entergram	Nov 25, 2021	Unreleased	Unreleased		
Gakuen	Shoot 'em up; visual novel	M2	M2	Unreleased	TBA	Unreleased		
Gal Gun: Double Peace	Rail shooter	Inti Creates	Alchemist	Aug 6, 2015	Aug 2, 2016	Mar 11, 2016		
Gal Gun 2	Rail shooter	Inti Creates	Inti Creates	Mar 15, 2018	Apr 24, 2018	Apr 13, 2018		
Gal Gunvolt	Rail shooter	Inti Creates	Inti Creates	Aug 6, 2015	Unreleased	Unreleased		
Gal Gunvolt Burst	Rail shooter	Inti Creates	Inti Creates	Mar 15, 2018	Mar 15, 2018	Apr 13, 2018		
Galacide	Shoot 'em up	Puny Human	Puny Human	Unreleased	Oct 23, 2020	Unreleased	P	
Galak-Z: The Dimensional	Shooter	17-Bit	17-Bit	Aug 4, 2015	Aug 4, 2015	Aug 5, 2015		
Galaxy of Pen & Paper +1 Edition	Role-playing	Behold Studios	Plug In Digital	Unreleased	Apr 7, 2020	Apr 7, 2020		
Galaxy Squad	Real-time strategy	Big Way LLC	Big Way LLC	Unreleased	Aug 31, 2021	Aug 31, 2021		
Game Dev Story	Business simulation	Kairosoft	Kairosoft	Dec 5, 2019	Unreleased	Unreleased		
Game of Thrones	Graphic adventure	Telltale Games	Telltale Games	Unreleased	Dec 3, 2014	Dec 3, 2014		
Game Tengoku CruisnMix	Arcade; shoot 'em up	City Connection	Degica	Nov 30, 2017	Jul 26, 2018	Dec 5, 2018		
Ganbare! Super Strikers	Tactical role-playing	Ratalaika Games	Ratalaika Games	Unreleased	Feb 25, 2020	Feb 26, 2020		
Gang Beasts	Party	Boneloaf Games	Double Fine Productions	Unreleased	Dec 12, 2017	Dec 12, 2017	VR	
The Gardens Between	Puzzle	The Voxel Agents	The Voxel Agents	Sep 20, 2018	Sep 20, 2018	Sep 20, 2018		
Garfield Kart: Furious Racing	Kart racing	Artefact	Microïds	Unreleased	Nov 5, 2019	Nov 5, 2019		
Garou: Mark of the Wolves	Fighting	Code Mystics	SNK Playmore	Dec 3, 2016	Dec 3, 2016	Dec 3, 2016	CP	
Gas Guzzlers Extreme	Racing; vehicular combat	Gamepires	Iceberg Interactive	Unreleased	Nov 26, 2019	Nov 26, 2019		
Gauntlet: Slayer Edition	Hack and slash	Arrowhead Studios	WB Games	Unreleased	Aug 11, 2015	Aug 11, 2015		
Gekido: Kintaro's Revenge	Beat 'em up	NAPS team	NAPS team	Unreleased	May 31, 2018	May 31, 2018		
Gemini: Heroes Reborn	Action-adventure	Phosphor Games	Phosphor Games	Unreleased	Jan 26, 2016	Jan 27, 2016		
Gem Smashers	Puzzle	Frame Studios	Funbox Media	Unreleased	Mar 3, 2017	Feb 24, 2017		
Generation Zero	Action	Avalanche Studios	Avalanche Studios	Mar 26, 2019	Mar 26, 2019	Mar 26, 2019	P	
Gensō No Rondo	2D arena fighter	Cube Type	PlayDoujin	Jun 11, 2015	Unreleased	Unreleased		
Gensō Rōgoku no Kaleidoscope	Visual novel	07th Expansion	Entergram	Dec 17, 2020	Unreleased	Unreleased		
Geometry Wars 3: Dimensions	Multidirectional shooter	Lucid Games	Sierra Entertainment	Unreleased	Nov 25, 2014	Nov 25, 2014		
Get Even	First-person shooter	The Farm 51	Bandai Namco Entertainment	Aug 8, 2017	Jun 23, 2017	Jun 23, 2017	P	
Ghost 1.0	Metroidvania	Francis Cota	Unepic Games	Unreleased	Apr 8, 2019	Jul 19, 2019		
Ghost Blade HD	Action	Hucast	2Dream	Sep 1, 2017	Feb 28, 2017	Feb 28, 2017		
Ghostbusters: The Video Game Remastered	Action-adventure	Saber Interactive	JP: H2 Interactive; WW: Mad Dog Games	Dec 12, 2019	Oct 4, 2019	Oct 4, 2019		
Ghost of a Tale	Adventure, stealth	SeithCG	SeithCG	Unreleased	Mar 12, 2019	Mar 12, 2019	P	
Ghost of Tsushima	Action-adventure	Sucker Punch Productions	Sony Interactive Entertainment	Jul 17, 2020	Jul 17, 2020	Jul 17, 2020	P	
Ghosts 'n Goblins Resurrection	Platform	Capcom	Capcom	Jun 1, 2021	Jun 1, 2021	Jun 1, 2021		
Ghostrunner	Action; platform	One More Level	All in! Games; 505 Games	Jan 28, 2021	Oct 27, 2020	Oct 27, 2020	CB	
Ghoulboy: Dark Sword of Goblin	Action platform	Serkan Bakar	Hidden Trap	Apr 11, 2019	Mar 5, 2019	Sep 25, 2019		
Ghoul Patrol	Run and gun	Dotemu	Lucasfilm Games	Unreleased	Jun 29, 2021	Jun 29, 2021		
G.I. Joe: Operation Blackout	Third-person shooter	IguanaBee	GameMill Entertainment	Unreleased	Oct 13, 2020	Oct 13, 2020		
Giana Sisters: Twisted Dreams - Director's Cut	Platform	Black Forest Games	Black Forest Games	Apr 7, 2020	Dec 9, 2014	Dec 9, 2014		
Giga Wrecker Alt.	Platform	Game Freak	Rising Star Games	Oct 24, 2019	Apr 30, 2019	Apr 30, 2019		
Gimmick! 2	Platformer; Action-adventure	Bitwave Games	Sunsoft; Clear River Games	Dec 19, 2024	Jan 30, 2025	Jan 30, 2025		
Ginga Force	Shoot 'em up	Qute Corporation	Rising Star Games	Jul 3, 2020	Sep 24, 2020	Sep 24, 2020		
Giraffe and Annika	Action-adventure; rhythm	Atelier Mimina	NIS America	Aug 27, 2020	Aug 25, 2020	Aug 28, 2020		
Girls und Panzer: Dream Tank Match	Action	Bandai Namco Entertainment	Bandai Namco Entertainment	Feb 22, 2018	Unreleased	Unreleased		
Glass Masquerade	Puzzle	Onyx Lute	Digerati	Unreleased	Feb 6, 2019	Feb 6, 2019		
Glass Masquerade 2	Puzzle	Onyx Lute	Digerati	Unreleased	Feb 11, 2020	Feb 12, 2020		
Glitched	Role-playing	En House Studios	En House Studios	Unreleased	TBA	TBA		
Gnog	Adventure, puzzle	KO_OP	KO_OP	May 2, 2017	May 2, 2017	May 2, 2017	VR	
Goat Simulator	Action	Coffee Stain Studios	Coffee Stain Studios	Oct 7, 2015	Aug 11, 2015	Aug 11, 2015		
Goat Simulator 3	Action; simulation	Coffee Stain North	Coffee Stain Publishing	Oct 24, 2024	Oct 24, 2024	Oct 24, 2024		
God Eater Resurrection	Action role-playing	Bandai Namco Entertainment	Bandai Namco Entertainment	Oct 29, 2015	Jun 29, 2016	Aug 30, 2016	CP	
God Eater 2: Rage Burst	Action role-playing	Bandai Namco Entertainment	Bandai Namco Entertainment	Feb 5, 2015	Aug 30, 2016	Aug 30, 2016	CP	
God Eater 3	Action role-playing	Marvelous First Studio	Bandai Namco Entertainment	Dec 13, 2018	Feb 8, 2019	Feb 8, 2019		
Godfall	Action role-playing	Counterplay Games	Gearbox Publishing	Aug 10, 2021	Aug 10, 2021	Aug 10, 2021		
God of War III Remastered	Action-adventure	Santa Monica Studio	Sony Computer Entertainment	Jul 16, 2015	Jul 14, 2015	Jul 15, 2015		
God of War	Action-adventure	Santa Monica Studio	Sony Interactive Entertainment	Apr 20, 2018	Apr 20, 2018	Apr 20, 2018	P	
God of War Ragnarök	Action-adventure	Santa Monica Studio	Sony Interactive Entertainment	Nov 9, 2022	Nov 9, 2022	Nov 9, 2022		
God of War Sons of Sparta	Metroidvania	Mega Cat Studios; Santa Monica Studio	Sony Interactive Entertainment	TBA	Nov 16, 2026	TBA		
God Wars: Future Past	Tactical role-playing	Kadokawa Games	Kadokawa Games	Jun 22, 2017	Jun 20, 2017	Jun 16, 2017		
God's Trigger	Top-down shooter	One More Level	Techland	Unreleased	Apr 18, 2019	Apr 18, 2019		
Gods Will Fall	Action-adventure	Clever Beans	Deep Silver	Unreleased	Jan 29, 2021	Jan 29, 2021		
Godzilla: The Game	Action-adventure	Bandai Namco Entertainment	Bandai Namco Entertainment	Jul 16, 2015	Jul 14, 2015	Jul 14, 2015		
Going Under	Action	Aggro Crab Games	Team17	Sep 24, 2020	Sep 24, 2020	Sep 24, 2020		
Golden Force	Action-adventure; platform	Storybird Studio	Just For Games; PixelHeart	Unreleased	TBA	TBA		
Golf Zero	Platform-puzzle	Colin Lane; Brad Erkkila	Ratalaika Games	Oct 15, 2020	Sep 8, 2020	Sep 8, 2020		
The Golf Club	Sports	HB Studios	HB Studios	Feb 2, 2018	Aug 26, 2014	Aug 26, 2014		
The Golf Club 2	Sports	HB Studios	HB Studios	Unreleased	Jun 27, 2017	Jun 27, 2017		
The Golf Club 2019 featuring PGA Tour	Sports	HB Studios	2K Sports	Oct 5, 2018	Aug 28, 2018	Aug 28, 2018		
Golf with Your Friends	Sports	Blacklight Interactive	Team17	May 21, 2020	May 19, 2020	May 19, 2020		
Gone Home	Adventure	The Fullbright Company	Midnight City	Nov 2, 2016	Jan 12, 2016	Feb 12, 2016		
Gonner	Roguelike	Art in Heart	Raw Fury	May 24, 2018	May 15, 2018	May 15, 2018		
Gonner 2	Roguelike	Art in Heart	Raw Fury	Unreleased	Nov 23, 2020	Nov 23, 2020		
Goodbye Deponia	Point-and-click adventure	Daedalic Entertainment	Daedalic Entertainment	Unreleased	Jan 30, 2019	Jan 30, 2019		
Goodbye Volcano High	Adventure	KO_OP	KO_OP	Aug 29, 2023	Aug 29, 2023	Aug 29, 2023		
The Good Life	Role-playing	White Owls	Playism	Oct 15, 2021	Oct 15, 2021	Oct 15, 2021		
Goosebumps: The Game	Point-and-click adventure	WayForward	GameMill Entertainment	Unreleased	Oct 13, 2015	Oct 13, 2015		
Gothic Murder: Adventure That Changes Destiny	Visual novel	Orange	Orange	Jul 29, 2020	Sep 24, 2020	Sep 24, 2020		
Grab the Bottle	Action, puzzle	Kamina Dimension	Sometimes You	Unreleased	Jun 20, 2018	Jun 20, 2018	P	
Graceful Explosion Machine	Shoot 'em up	Vertex Pop	Vertex Pop	Aug 8, 2017	Aug 8, 2017	Aug 8, 2017		
Granblue Fantasy: Relink	Action role-playing	Cygames	Cygames	Feb 1, 2024	Feb 1, 2024	Feb 1, 2024		
Granblue Fantasy Versus	Fighting	Arc System Works	JP: Cygames; NA: Xseed Games; EU: Marvelous Europe	Feb 6, 2020	Mar 3, 2020	Mar 27, 2020		
Granblue Fantasy Versus: Rising	Fighting	Arc System Works	Cygames	Dec 14, 2023	Dec 14, 2023	Dec 14, 2023		
Grand Ages: Medieval	Grand strategy wargame	Gaming Minds Studios	Kalypso Media	Jun 9, 2016	Oct 13, 2015	Oct 9, 2015		
Grand Kingdom	Tactical role-playing	MonoChro	Spike Chunsoft	Nov 19, 2015	Jun 21, 2016	Jun 17, 2016	CP	
Grand Prix Rock N Racing	Racing	Unfinished Pixel	Unfinished Pixel	Unreleased	Oct 7, 2016	Oct 7, 2016		
Grand Prix Story	Simulation	Kairosoft	Kairosoft	Oct 15, 2020	Oct 15, 2020	Oct 15, 2020		
Grand Theft Auto: The Trilogy – The Definitive Edition	Action-adventure	Grove Street Games	Rockstar Games	Nov 11, 2021	Nov 11, 2021	Nov 11, 2021		
Grand Theft Auto V	Action-adventure; open world	Rockstar North	Rockstar Games	Dec 11, 2014	Nov 18, 2014	Nov 18, 2014		
Gran Turismo 7	Racing; simulation	Polyphony Digital	Sony Interactive Entertainment	Mar 4, 2022	Mar 4, 2022	Mar 4, 2022	P	
Gran Turismo Sport	Racing; simulation	Polyphony Digital	Sony Interactive Entertainment	Oct 19, 2017	Oct 17, 2017	Oct 18, 2017	P VR	
Gravel	Racing	Milestone s.r.l.	Milestone s.r.l.	Feb 27, 2018	Feb 27, 2018	Feb 27, 2018		
Graveyard Keeper	Role-playing; simulation	Lazy Bear Games	TinyBuild	Unreleased	Jun 27, 2019	Jun 27, 2019		
Gravity Heroes	Shoot 'em up	Studica Solutions	PQube	Unreleased	Jan 22, 2021	Jan 22, 2021		
Gravity Ghost: Deluxe Edition	Physics based puzzler	Ivy Games	Ivy Games	Unreleased	Aug 6, 2019	Unreleased		
Gravity Rush Remastered	Action role-playing	Japan Studio	Sony Computer Entertainment	Nov 12, 2015	Feb 9, 2016	Feb 10, 2016		
Gravity Rush 2	Action role-playing	Japan Studio	Sony Interactive Entertainment	Jan 19, 2017	Jan 20, 2017	Jan 20, 2017	P	
The Great Ace Attorney Chronicles	Adventure	Capcom	Capcom	Jul 29, 2021	Jul 27, 2021	Jul 27, 2021		
GreedFall	Action role-playing	Spiders	Focus Home Interactive	Sep 10, 2019	Sep 10, 2019	Sep 10, 2019		
Green Hell	Survival	Creepy Jar	Creepy Jar	Sep 14, 2021	Jun 9, 2021	Jun 9, 2021		
Grey Skies: A War of the Worlds Story	Action-adventure	Steel Arts Software	Steel Arts Software	Unreleased	Nov 5, 2020	Nov 5, 2020		
Grid	Racing	Codemasters	Codemasters	Unreleased	Oct 11, 2019	Oct 11, 2019		
Grid Legends	Racing	Codemasters	Electronic Arts	Feb 25, 2022	Feb 25, 2022	Feb 25, 2022		
Gridd: Retroenhanced	Shoot 'em up	Antab Studio	Kongregate	Unreleased	Oct 23, 2018	Oct 23, 2018	P	
Griftlands	Roguelike; deck-building	Klei Entertainment	Klei Entertainment	Unreleased	Jun 4, 2021	Jun 4, 2021		
Grim Fandango Remastered	Graphic adventure	Double Fine Productions	Disney Interactive Studios	Nov 2, 2016	Jan 27, 2015	Jan 28, 2015		
GrimGrimoire OnceMore	Real-time strategy	Vanillaware	Nippon Ichi Software	Jul 28, 2022	Apr 4, 2023	Apr 7, 2023		
Grim Legends: The Forsaken Bride	Puzzle; hidden object	Artifex Mundi	Artifex Mundi	Unreleased	Feb 28, 2017	Feb 28, 2017		
Grim Legends 2: Song of the Dark Swan	Puzzle; hidden object	Artifex Mundi	Artifex Mundi	Unreleased	Aug 29, 2017	Aug 29, 2017		
Grim Legends 3: The Dark City	Puzzle; hidden object	Artifex Mundi	Artifex Mundi	Unreleased	May 11, 2018	May 11, 2018		
Grip: Combat Racing	Racing	Caged Element	Caged Element	Mar 28, 2019	Nov 6, 2018	Nov 6, 2018	P	
Gris	Platform-adventure	Nomada Studio	JP: GHI Media; WW: Devolver Digital	Dec 12, 2019	Nov 26, 2019	Nov 26, 2019	P	
Grood	Shoot 'em up	CC_ARTS	Drageus Games	Unreleased	Oct 23, 2020	Oct 23, 2020		
Grounded	Survival	Obsidian Entertainment	Xbox Game Studios	Apr 16, 2024	Apr 16, 2024	Apr 16, 2024		
Grow Home	Adventure, platform	Ubisoft	Ubisoft	Sep 2, 2015	Sep 1, 2015	Sep 1, 2015		
Grow Up	Adventure	Ubisoft Reflections	Ubisoft	Aug 17, 2016	Aug 16, 2016	Aug 16, 2016		
Guacamelee! Super Turbo Championship Edition	Beat 'em up; platform	DrinkBox Studios	DrinkBox Studios	Unreleased	Jul 2, 2014	Jul 2, 2014		
Guacamelee! 2	Beat 'em up; platform	DrinkBox Studios	DrinkBox Studios	Unreleased	Aug 21, 2018	Aug 21, 2018		
Guard Duty	Point & click adventure	Sick Chicken Studios	Ratalaika Games	Unreleased	Apr 21, 2020	Apr 21, 2020		
Marvel's Guardians of the Galaxy	Action-Adventure	Eidos Montréal	Square Enix	Oct 26, 2021	Oct 26, 2021	Oct 26, 2021		
Guardians of the Galaxy: The Telltale Series	Graphic adventure	Telltale Games	Telltale Games	Unreleased	Apr 18, 2017	Apr 18, 2017		
Guild of Darksteel	Adventure; side-scrolling	Igor Sandman	Digerati	Unreleased	TBA	TBA		
Guilty Gear	Fighting	Arc System Works	Arc System Works	May 16, 2019	May 16, 2019	May 22, 2019		
Guilty Gear Strive	Fighting	Arc System Works	Arc System Works	Jun 11, 2021	Jun 11, 2021	Jun 11, 2021		
Guilty Gear Xrd: Revelator	Fighting	Arc System Works	Arc System Works	May 26, 2016	Jun 7, 2016	Jun 10, 2016	CP	
Guilty Gear Xrd: Sign	Fighting	Arc System Works	Aksys Games	Dec 4, 2014	Dec 16, 2014	Jun 3, 2015	CP	
Guitar Hero Live	Music, rhythm	FreeStyleGames	Activision	Unreleased	Oct 20, 2015	Oct 23, 2015		
Gunbird	Shoot 'em up	Zerodiv	City Connection	Jul 27, 2022	Jul 27, 2022	Jul 27, 2022		
Gunbird 2	Shoot 'em up	Zerodiv	City Connection	Aug 3, 2022	Aug 3, 2022	Aug 3, 2022		
Gundam Breaker 3	Mech-combat	Bandai Namco Entertainment	Bandai Namco Entertainment	Mar 3, 2016	Unreleased	Unreleased		
Gundam Evolution	Mech-combat	Bandai Namco Entertainment	Bandai Namco Entertainment	Dec 1, 2022	Dec 1, 2022	Dec 1, 2022		
Gundam Versus	Mech-combat	Bandai Namco Entertainment	Bandai Namco Entertainment	Jul 6, 2017	Sep 29, 2017	Sep 29, 2017		
Gungrave G.O.R.E.	Third-person shooter	Iggymob	Iggymob	Nov 22, 2022	Nov 22, 2022	Nov 22, 2022		
Gunhead	Action; shooter	Alientrap	Alientrap	Unreleased	TBA	TBA		
Gunlord X	Action platform	NGDEV	EastAsiaSoft	Dec 13, 2019	Dec 10, 2019	Dec 11, 2019		
Gunman Clive HD Collection	Action; platform	Horberg Productions	JP: Flyhigh Works; WW: Hörberg Productions	May 22, 2020	May 22, 2020	May 22, 2020		
Guns, Gore and Cannoli	Action; platform	Crazy Monkey Studios	JP: IntraGames; WW: Crazy Monkey Studios	Jul 1, 2016	Dec 8, 2015	Dec 8, 2015		
Guns, Gore and Cannoli 2	Action; platform	Crazy Monkey Studios	JP: IntraGames; WW: Crazy Monkey Studios	Aug 9, 2018	Aug 14, 2018	Aug 14, 2018		
Gunscape	First-person shooter	Blowfish Studios	Blowfish Studios	Unreleased	Mar 1, 2016	Mar 1, 2016		
Guns of Icarus Alliance	Action; strategy	Muse Games	Muse Games	Unreleased	May 1, 2018	May 1, 2018	CP	
Gunvein	Shoot 'em up	NGDEV	NGDEV	TBA	TBA	TBA		
Gunvolt Chronicles: Luminous Avenger iX	Action; platform	Inti Creates	Inti Creates	Sep 26, 2019	Sep 26, 2019	Sep 26, 2019		
Gunvolt Chronicles: Luminous Avenger iX 2	Action; platform	Inti Creates	Inti Creates	Jan 27, 2022	Jan 27, 2022	Jan 27, 2022		
Hakoniwa Company Works	Role-playing; sandbox	Nippon Ichi Software	Nippon Ichi Software	Jul 13, 2017	Unreleased	Unreleased		
Hamidashi Creative	Visual novel	Madosoft	iMel	Jun 24, 2021	Unreleased	Unreleased		
Hammerwatch	Hack and slash	Crackshell	BlitWorks	Unreleased	Dec 19, 2017	Dec 20, 2017		
Hand of Fate	Action role-playing	Defiant Development	Defiant Development	Feb 17, 2015	Feb 17, 2015	Feb 17, 2015		
Hand of Fate 2	Action role-playing	Defiant Development	Defiant Development	Nov 7, 2017	Nov 7, 2017	Nov 7, 2017	P	
Handball 16	Sports	Eko Software	Bigben Interactive	Unreleased	Nov 30, 2015	Nov 27, 2015		
Handball 17	Sports	Eko Software	Bigben Interactive	Unreleased	Nov 11, 2016	Nov 11, 2016		
Handball 21	Sports	Eko Software	Nacon	Unreleased	Nov 12, 2020	Nov 12, 2020		
Hard Reset Redux	First-person shooter	Flying Wild Hog	Gambitious Entertainment	Unreleased	Jun 3, 2016	Jun 3, 2016		
Hard West: Ultimate Edition	Turn-based tactics	CreativeForge Games	Forever Entertainment	Unreleased	Jun 28, 2020	Jun 28, 2020	P	
Hardcore Mecha	Action	RocketPunch	JP: Arc System Works; WW: RocketPunch	Jun 27, 2019	Jan 14, 2020	Jan 14, 2020		
Hardware: Rivals	Vehicular combat	Connected Content Group	Sony Computer Entertainment	Feb 3, 2016	Jan 5, 2016	Jan 5, 2016		
Harvest Moon: Light of Hope	Life; farm simulation	Natsume Inc.	Natsume Inc.	Unreleased	May 29, 2018	Jun 22, 2018		
Harvest Moon: Mad Dash	Life; farm simulation	Natsume Inc.	NA: Natsume Inc.; EU: Rising Star Games	Unreleased	Oct 29, 2019	Oct 29, 2019		
Harvest Moon: One World	Life; farm simulation	Natsume Inc.	Natsume Inc.	Unreleased	Mar 5, 2021	Mar 2, 2021		
Has-Been Heroes	Action; roguelike; strategy	Frozenbyte	Gamestrust	Aug 8, 2017	Mar 28, 2017	Apr 4, 2017		
Hatoful Boyfriend	Visual novel	Mediatonic	Devolver Digital	Jul 21, 2015	Jul 21, 2015	Jul 22, 2015		
Hatsune Miku: Project Diva Future Tone	Rhythm	Sega	Sega	Jun 23, 2016	Jan 10, 2017	Jan 10, 2017		
Hatsune Miku: Project Diva X	Rhythm	Sega	Sega	Aug 25, 2016	Aug 30, 2016	Aug 30, 2016	P	
Haven	Adventure; role-playing	The Game Bakers	The Game Bakers	Dec 3, 2021	Feb 4, 2021	Feb 4, 2021		
Headlander	Action-adventure	Double Fine Productions	Adult Swim Games	Unreleased	Jul 26, 2016	Jul 26, 2016		
Headliner: NoviNews	Simulation	Unbound Creations	Chorus Worldwide	Dec 12, 2019	Dec 10, 2019	Dec 11, 2019		
Headsnatchers	Action; party	IguanaBee	Iceberg Interactive	Unreleased	Jul 28, 2020	Jul 28, 2020		
Heart&Slash	3D brawler	aheartfulofgames	BadLand Games	Oct 31, 2016	Jun 28, 2016	Jun 24, 2016		
Heavenly Bodies	Space; simulation	2pt Interactive	2pt Interactive	Unreleased	Dec 7, 2021	Dec 7, 2021		
Heaven's Vault	Adventure	Inkle	Inkle	Unreleased	Apr 16, 2019	Apr 16, 2019		
Heavy Rain	Interactive drama	Quantic Dream	Sony Computer Entertainment	Jun 1, 2016	Mar 1, 2016	Mar 2, 2016		
Hellblade: Senua's Sacrifice	Action, hack and slash	Ninja Theory	Ninja Theory	Unreleased	Aug 8, 2017	Aug 8, 2017	P	
Helldivers	Shoot 'em up	Arrowhead Studios	Sony Computer Entertainment	Mar 5, 2015	Mar 3, 2015	Mar 4, 2015	CP	
Hellfront: Honeymoon	Shoot 'em up	Skygoblin	Thunderful Publishing	Unreleased	Dec 19, 2018	Dec 19, 2018		
Hellmut: The Badass from Hell	Shooter; roguelike	Grindstone; Volcani	2Tainment	Unreleased	Jun 6, 2019	Dec 17, 2019		
Hello Neighbor	Stealth	Dynamic Pixels	TinyBuild	Jul 26, 2018	Jul 26, 2018	Jul 26, 2018		
Hellpoint	Action role-playing	Cradle Games	TinyBuild	Unreleased	Jul 30, 2020	Jul 30, 2020	CB	
Here They Lie	Horror	Tangentlemen	Sony Interactive Entertainment	Unreleased	Oct 13, 2016	Oct 13, 2016	VR	
Her Majesty's Spiffing	Point-and-click adventure	Billy Goat Entertainment	Billy Goat Entertainment	Dec 13, 2016	Dec 13, 2016	Dec 13, 2016		
Hero Defense	Tower defense	Happy Tuesday	Headup Games	Unreleased	Aug 16, 2018	Aug 16, 2018		
Hero Must Die. Again	Role-playing; turn-based strategy	Pyramid; G-Mode	Degica Games	Feb 26, 2020	Feb 26, 2020	Feb 26, 2020		
Hero Siege	Action role-playing; hack and slash	Panic Art Studios	Panic Art Studios	TBA	TBA	TBA	CP	
Heroes of Hammerwatch: Ultimate Edition	Action; roguelike	Crackshell	BlitWorks	Unreleased	Dec 1, 2020	Dec 1, 2020		
Heroland	Role-playing	Netchubiyori	JP: FuRyu; WW: Xseed Games	Feb 28, 2018	Dec 3, 2019	Dec 3, 2019		
H-Hour: World's Elite	Tactical shooter	SOF Studios	SOF Studios	TBA	TBA	TBA		
Hidden Agenda	Interactive drama	Supermassive Games	Sony Interactive Entertainment	Nov 22, 2017	Nov 22, 2017	Oct 24, 2017	PL	
Hidden Through Time	Puzzle; hidden object	Crazy Monkey Studios	Crazy Monkey Studios	Unreleased	Mar 12, 2020	Mar 12, 2020		
Hide & Dance!	Music; rhythm	hap inc.	hap inc.	Sep 30, 2020	Nov 19, 2020	Nov 19, 2020		
Hindsight 20/20: Wrath of the Raakshasa	Action-adventure	Triple-I Games	Triple-I Games	Unreleased	TBA	TBA		
Hitman	Stealth	IO Interactive	Square Enix	Aug 10, 2017	Mar 11, 2016	Mar 11, 2016	P	
Hitman 2	Stealth	IO Interactive	WB Games	Nov 13, 2018	Nov 13, 2018	Nov 13, 2018	P	
Hitman III	Stealth	IO Interactive	JP: H2 Interactive; WW: IO Interactive	Aug 26, 2021	Jan 20, 2021	Jan 20, 2021	CB P VR	
Hitman Go	Puzzle	Square Enix Montréal	Square Enix	Feb 23, 2016	Feb 23, 2016	Feb 23, 2016		
Hitman HD Enhanced Collection	Stealth	IO Interactive	IO Interactive	Jan 11, 2019	Jan 11, 2019	Jan 11, 2019		
Hob	Action-adventure	Runic Games	Sony Interactive Entertainment	Sep 26, 2017	Sep 26, 2017	Sep 26, 2017		
Hogwarts Legacy	Action-role playing	Avalanche Software	Portkey Games	May 5, 2023	May 5, 2023	May 5, 2023		
Hohokum	Adventure	Honeyslug	Sony Computer Entertainment	Aug 13, 2014	Aug 12, 2014	Aug 13, 2014		
Hollow Knight	Metroidvania	Team Cherry	Team Cherry	Sep 26, 2018	Sep 26, 2018	Sep 26, 2018		
Hollow Knight: Silksong	Metroidvania	Team Cherry	Team Cherry	Sep 4, 2025	Sep 4, 2025	Sep 4, 2025		
Holy Potatoes! A Weapon Shop?!	Adventure; strategy	Daylight Studios	Rising Star Games	Unreleased	Jul 12, 2018	Jul 11, 2018		
Holy Potatoes! We're in Space?!	Adventure; strategy	Daylight Studios	Rising Star Games	Unreleased	Jan 15, 2019	Jan 15, 2019		
Holy Potatoes! What the Hell?!	Adventure; strategy	Daylight Studios	Rising Star Games	Unreleased	Jun 4, 2020	Jun 5, 2020		
Home: A Unique Horror Adventure	Survival horror	Benjamin Rivers	Benjamin Rivers	Unreleased	Oct 23, 2014	Apr 15, 2015		
Home Free	Role-playing	Kevin Cancienne	Kevin Cancienne	TBA	TBA	TBA		
Homefront: The Revolution	First-person shooter	Deep Silver Dambuster	Deep Silver	May 19, 2016	May 17, 2016	May 20, 2016		
The Hong Kong Massacre	Top-down shooter	Vreski	Captain Rogue	Unreleased	Jan 29, 2019	Jan 22, 2019		
Hood: Outlaws & Legends	Stealth; action	Sumo Digital	Focus Home Interactive	May 10, 2021	May 10, 2021	May 10, 2021		
HoPiKo	Platform	Laser Dog	Merge Games	Unreleased	Oct 18, 2016	Sep 21, 2016		
Horizon Chase Turbo	Racing	Aquiris Studio	Aquiris Studio	Dec 19, 2019	May 15, 2018	May 15, 2018		
Horizon Forbidden West	Action role-playing	Guerrilla Games	Sony Interactive Entertainment	Feb 18, 2022	Feb 18, 2022	Feb 18, 2022	CB	
Horizon Zero Dawn	Action role-playing	Guerrilla Games	Sony Interactive Entertainment	Mar 2, 2017	Feb 28, 2017	Mar 1, 2017	P	
Horned Knight	Action platform	Josep Monzonis Hernandez	2Awesome Studio	Unreleased	Feb 23, 2021	Feb 23, 2021		
Horror Break	Arcade	Smobile	Smobile	Unreleased	Aug 27, 2021	Aug 26, 2021		
Horror Break: Head to Head	Arcade	Smobile	Smobile	Unreleased	Sep 2, 2021	Sep 2, 2021		
Hotel Life: A Resort Simulator	Business simulation	RingZero Game Studio	Nacon	Unreleased	Aug 26, 2021	Aug 26, 2021		
Hotel Transylvania 3: Monsters Overboard	Action	Torus Games	Outright Games	Unreleased	Jul 10, 2018	Jul 10, 2018		
Hotel Transylvania: Scary-Tale Adventures	Platform	Drakhar Studio	Outright Games	Unreleased	TBA	TBA		
Hotline Miami	Top-down shooter	Dennaton Games	Devolver Digital	Jun 25, 2015	Aug 19, 2014	Aug 20, 2014		
Hotline Miami 2: Wrong Number	Top-down shooter	Dennaton Games	Devolver Digital	Jun 25, 2015	Mar 10, 2015	Mar 11, 2015		
Hot Springs Story	Business simulation	Kairosoft	Kairosoft	Dec 5, 2019	Unreleased	Unreleased		
Hotshot Racing	Racing	Lucky Mountain Games	Sumo Digital	Unreleased	Aug 13, 2020	Sep 10, 2020		
Hot Wheels Monster Trucks: Stunt Mayhem	Racing	3DClouds	GameMill Entertainment	Oct 18, 2024	Oct 18, 2024	Oct 18, 2024		
Hot Wheels Unleashed	Racing	Milestone	Milestone	Sep 30, 2021	Sep 30, 2021	Sep 30, 2021		
Hot Wheels Unleashed 2: Turbocharged	Racing	Milestone	Milestone	Oct 19, 2023	Oct 19, 2023	Oct 19, 2023		
House Flipper	Simulation	Empyrean	Frozen District	Feb 27, 2019	Feb 25, 2019	Feb 25, 2019		
The House in Fata Morgana: Dream of the Revenants Edition	Visual novel	Novectacle	Limited Run Games	Oct 24, 2019	Jun 11, 2019	Jun 11, 2019	P	
The House of the Dead: Remake	Light gun shooter	MegaPixel Studio	Forever Entertainment	Apr 28, 2022	Apr 28, 2022	Apr 28, 2022		
How to Survive: Storm Warning Edition	Action role-playing, survival	Eko Software	505 Games	Apr 8, 2015	Nov 4, 2014	Oct 29, 2014		
How to Survive 2	Action role-playing, survival	Eko Software	505 Games	Feb 6, 2017	Feb 6, 2017	Feb 6, 2017		
How To Take Off Your Mask Remastered	Visual novel	Roseverte	Ratalaika Games	Feb 4, 2021	Feb 5, 2021	Feb 5, 2021		
Hue	Puzzle-platform	Fiddlesticks	Curve Digital	Unreleased	Aug 23, 2016	Aug 30, 2016		
Human: Fall Flat	Physics, puzzle	No Brakes Games	Curve Digital	May 23, 2019	May 9, 2017	May 9, 2017		
Humanity	Action	Tha	Enhance Games	Unreleased	TBA	TBA	VR	
Huntdown	Arcade; shooter	Easy Trigger Games	Coffee Stain Publishing	Unreleased	May 12, 2020	May 12, 2020		
Hunt: Showdown	First-person shooter	Crytek	Crytek	Unreleased	Feb 18, 2020	Feb 18, 2020	CP P	
The Huntsman: Winter's Curse	Adventure; role-playing	Desert Owl Games	Desert Owl Games	Unreleased	Aug 16, 2016	Aug 23, 2016		
Hyper Jam	Arena brawler	Bit Dragon	Bit Dragon	Unreleased	Feb 12, 2019	Feb 13, 2019	P	
Hyperdimension Neptunia Re;Birth 1 Plus	Role-playing	Compile Heart, Felistella	Compile Heart	May 31, 2018	Oct 28, 2025	Oct 28, 2025		
Hyperdimension Neptunia Re;Birth 2: Sisters Generation	Role-playing	Compile Heart, Felistella	Compile Heart	Aug 31, 2024	Oct 28, 2025	Oct 28, 2025		
Hyperdimension Neptunia Re;Birth 3: V Generation	Role-playing	Compile Heart	Compile Heart	Aug 31, 2024	Oct 28, 2025	Oct 28, 2025		
Hyper Light Drifter	Action role-playing	Heart Machine	Heart Machine	May 25, 2017	Jul 26, 2016	Jul 26, 2016		
Hyper Void	Shooter	IN|Framez	IN|Framez	Sep 8, 2015	Sep 8, 2015	Sep 8, 2015	VR	
HyperParasite	Twin-stick shooter; roguelike	Troglobytes Games	Troglobytes Games	Apr 3, 2020	Apr 3, 2020	Apr 3, 2020		
Hypnospace Outlaw	Simulation; puzzle	Tendershoot	No More Robots	Unreleased	Aug 27, 2020	Aug 27, 2020		
I, AI	Shoot 'em up	Satur Entertainment	Sometimes You	Unreleased	Dec 9, 2020	Dec 9, 2020		
I Am Bread	Puzzle	Bossa Studios	Bossa Studios	Aug 25, 2015	Dec 25, 2015	Aug 25, 2015		
I Am Dead	Adventure	Hollow Ponds	Annapurna Interactive	Aug 9, 2021	Aug 9, 2021	Aug 9, 2021		
I Am Setsuna	Role-playing	Tokyo RPG Factory	Square Enix	Feb 18, 2015	Jul 19, 2016	Jul 19, 2016		
Ib	Adventure	kouri	kouri	Mar 14, 2024	Mar 14, 2024	Mar 14, 2024		
Ice Age: Scrat's Nutty Adventure	Action, Adventure	Outright Games	Outright Games	Unreleased	Oct 18, 2019	Oct 18, 2019		
Icewind Dale: Enhanced Edition	Role-playing	Beamdog	Skybound Games	Unreleased	Sep 24, 2019	Sep 27, 2019		
Icey	Hack and slash	X.D. Network	X.D. Network	Unreleased	Aug 8, 2017	Unreleased		
Iconoclasts	Action; platform	Konjak	Bifrost Entertainment	Jan 23, 2018	Jan 23, 2018	Jan 23, 2018		
The Idolmaster Platinum Stars	Music; rhythm	Bandai Namco Entertainment	Bandai Namco Entertainment	Jul 28, 2016	Unreleased	Unreleased		
The Idolmaster Starlit Season	Music; rhythm	Bandai Namco Entertainment	Bandai Namco Entertainment	May 27, 2021	Unreleased	Unreleased		
The Idolmaster: Stella Stage	Music; rhythm	Bandai Namco Entertainment	Bandai Namco Entertainment	Dec 21, 2017	Unreleased	Unreleased		
Ikaruga	Shoot 'em up	Treasure	Nicalis	Jun 29, 2018	Jun 29, 2018	Jun 29, 2018		
Ikenfell	Tactical role-playing	Happy Ray Games	Humble Games	Unreleased	Oct 8, 2020	Oct 8, 2020		
Illusion of L'Phalcia	Role-playing	Exe Create	Kemco	Jul 3, 2019	Aug 6, 2019	Aug 21, 2019		
Immortal Planet	Action role-playing	Teedoubleu Games	Monster Couch	Unreleased	Dec 6, 2019	Dec 6, 2019		
Immortal Realms: Vampire Wars	Turn-based strategy	Palindrome	Kalypso Media	Dec 27, 2021	Aug 28, 2020	Aug 28, 2020	P	
Immortal Redneck	Shooter	CremaGames	CremaGames	Feb 28, 2018	Feb 27, 2018	Feb 27, 2018		
Immortal: Unchained	Action role-playing	Toadman Interactive	Game Odyssey	Aug 29, 2019	Sep 7, 2018	Sep 7, 2018		
Immortals Fenyx Rising	Action-adventure	Ubisoft Quebec	Ubisoft	Dec 3, 2020	Dec 3, 2020	Dec 3, 2020	CB	
Impact Winter	Survival	Bandai Namco Entertainment	Bandai Namco Entertainment	Apr 11, 2018	Apr 5, 2018	Apr 5, 2018		
In Between	Platform	Gentlymad	Headup Games	Unreleased	Oct 8, 2019	Oct 8, 2019		
Inazuma Eleven: Victory Road	Role-playing; sports	Level-5	Level-5	Nov 14, 2025	Nov 13, 2025	Nov 13, 2025		
Infliction: Extended Cut	Survival horror	Caustic Reality	Blowfish Studios	Unreleased	Feb 25, 2020	Feb 25, 2020		
In Celebration of Violence	Roguelike	Julian Edison	Dolores Entertainment	Unreleased	Nov 24, 2020	Nov 25, 2020		
The Incredible Adventures of Van Helsing	Action role-playing	NeocoreGames	NeocoreGames	May 15, 2017	Feb 28, 2017	Mar 1, 2017		
The Incredible Adventures of Van Helsing II	Action role-playing	NeocoreGames	NeocoreGames	Jan 10, 2018	Aug 15, 2017	Aug 8, 2017		
The Incredible Adventures of Van Helsing III	Action role-playing	NeocoreGames	NeocoreGames	Unreleased	Jan 31, 2020	Jan 30, 2020	P	
Industry Giant II	Business simulation	Fancy Bytes	UIG Entertainment	Sep 15, 2017	Dec 20, 2016	Dec 20, 2016		
Indivisible	Action role-playing	Lab Zero Games	505 Games	Jul 16, 2020	Oct 8, 2019	Oct 11, 2019		
Inertial Drift	Racing	Level 91 Entertainment	PQube	Unreleased	Sep 11, 2020	Sep 11, 2020		
Infamous First Light	Action-adventure	Sucker Punch Productions	Sony Computer Entertainment	Sep 11, 2014	Aug 26, 2014	Aug 27, 2014	P	
Infamous Second Son	Action-adventure	Sucker Punch Productions	Sony Computer Entertainment	May 22, 2014	Mar 21, 2014	Mar 21, 2014	P	
Infernax	Action-adventure	Berzerk Studio	The Arcade Crew	Unreleased	Feb 14, 2022	Feb 14, 2022		
Inferno 2	Shoot 'em up	Radiangames	2Awesome Studio	Unreleased	Sep 19, 2019	Sep 19, 2019		
Inferno Climber: Reborn	Action role-playing	Arc System Works	Arc System Works	Mar 28, 2019	Mar 28, 2019	Mar 28, 2019		
Infinifactory	Puzzle	Zachtronics	Zachtronics	Unreleased	Dec 22, 2015	Dec 22, 2015		
Infinite Minigolf	Sports	Zen Studios	Zen Studios	Sep 21, 2017	Jul 25, 2017	Jul 25, 2017	P VR	
Injustice: Gods Among Us Ultimate Edition	Fighting	High Voltage Software	WB Games	Unreleased	Nov 15, 2013	Nov 29, 2013		
Injustice 2	Fighting	NetherRealm Studios	WB Games	Unreleased	May 16, 2017	May 19, 2017	P	
The Inner Friend	Psychological horror	Playmind	Global Mind	Apr 30, 2020	Apr 20, 2020	Apr 20, 2020		
The Inner World	Point-and-click adventure	Studio Fizbin	Headup Games	Mar 31, 2017	Mar 31, 2017	Mar 31, 2017		
In Nightmare	Action-adventure; horror	Magicfish Studio	Maximum Games	TBA	TBA	TBA		
The Inpatient	Interactive drama	Supermassive Games	Sony Interactive Entertainment	Jan 25, 2018	Jan 23, 2018	Jan 24, 2018	VR	
In Rays of the Light	Action-adventure	Sergey Noskov	Sometimes You	Unreleased	Mar 17, 2021	Mar 17, 2021		
Insane Robots	Turn-based strategy	Playniac	Playniac	Unreleased	Jul 10, 2018	Jul 10, 2018	P	
Inscryption	Roguelike deck-building	Daniel Mullins Game	Devolver Digital	Aug 30, 2022	Aug 30, 2022	Aug 30, 2022		
Inside	Platform	Playdead	Playdead	Aug 23, 2016	Aug 23, 2016	Aug 23, 2016		
Inside My Radio	Platform, rhythm	Seaven Studio	Iceberg Interactive	May 11, 2015	May 11, 2015	May 11, 2015		
Insurgency: Sandstorm	First-person shooter	New World Interactive	Focus Home Interactive	Unreleased	Sep 29, 2021	Sep 29, 2021		
In the Shadows	Platform, puzzle	Colorspace Studio	Colorspace Studio	Unreleased	TBA	TBA		
Inuwashi: Urabure Tantei to Ojou-sama Keiji no Ikebukuro Jiken File	Visual novel	Orange	Orange	Aug 25, 2020	Unreleased	Unreleased		
Invector	Music; rhythm	Hello There	Hello There	Unreleased	Dec 7, 2017	Dec 6, 2017		
Inversus	Action; puzzle	Hypersect	Hypersect	Aug 31, 2016	Aug 16, 2016	Aug 17, 2016		
Invisible, Inc.	Turn-based tactics	Klei Entertainment	Klei Entertainment	Unreleased	Apr 19, 2016	Apr 19, 2016		
The Invisible Hours	Adventure; mystery	Tequila Works	Game Trust	Unreleased	Oct 10, 2017	Oct 17, 2017	VR	
Invisigun Reloaded	Action	Sombr Studio	Sombr Studio	Sep 5, 2019	Aug 27, 2019	Sep 25, 2019		
iO	Platform, puzzle	Gamious	Gamious	Unreleased	Feb 14, 2017	Feb 14, 2017		
Ion Driver	Racing	Moon Whale Studio	Gammera Nest	Unreleased	Jul 30, 2021	Jul 29, 2021		
Ion Fury	First-person shooter	Voidpoint	1C Online Games	Unreleased	May 14, 2020	May 14, 2020		
Iris.Fall	Puzzle adventure	NExT Studios	PM Studios	Feb 17, 2021	Jan 8, 2021	Jan 8, 2021		
Ironcast	Puzzle, strategy	Dreadbit	Dreadbit	Unreleased	Mar 1, 2016	Mar 2, 2016		
Ironclad Tactics	Strategy	Zachtronics	Zachtronics	Unreleased	Jan 20, 2015	Jan 20, 2015		
Iron Crypticle	Role-playing; shooter	Confused Pelican	Tikipod	Unreleased	Jul 11, 2017	Jul 11, 2017		
Iron Harvest	Real-time strategy	King Art Games	Deep Silver	Unreleased	Sep 1, 2020	Sep 1, 2020		
Iron Sea Defenders	Tower defense	Creobit	8 Floor Games	Unreleased	Jun 13, 2017	Jun 14, 2017		
Irony Curtain: From Matryoshka with Love	Puzzle; hidden object	Artifex Mundi	Artifex Mundi	Unreleased	Jun 25, 2019	Jun 25, 2019		
Is It Wrong to Try to Pick Up Girls in a Dungeon? Infinite Combat	Action role-playing	5pb.	5pb.	Nov 28, 2019	Aug 11, 2020	Aug 7, 2020		
Island	Visual novel	Frontwing	Prototype	Jun 28, 2018	Unreleased	Unreleased		
It's Quiz Time	Quiz	Snap Finger Click	Vision Games	Unreleased	Nov 28, 2017	Nov 28, 2017		
It Takes Two	Adventure; platform	Hazelight Studios	Electronic Arts	Mar 26, 2021	Mar 26, 2021	Mar 26, 2021		
Ittle Dew 2	Action-adventure	Ludosity	Nicalis	Unreleased	Nov 15, 2016	Nov 15, 2016		
J-Stars Victory Vs+	Fighting	Spike Chunsoft	Bandai Namco Entertainment	Jun 26, 2015	Mar 19, 2015	Jun 30, 2015		
Jack Move	Role Playing	So Romantic	Hype Train Digital	Sep 20, 2022	Sep 20, 2022	Sep 20, 2022		
The Jackbox Naughty Pack	Party; trivia	Jackbox Games	Jackbox Games	Unreleased	Sep 12, 2024	Sep 12, 2024		
The Jackbox Party Pack	Party; trivia	Jackbox Games	Jackbox Games	Unreleased	Nov 18, 2014	Jun 2, 2015		
The Jackbox Party Pack 2	Party; trivia	Jackbox Games	Jackbox Games	Unreleased	Oct 13, 2015	Oct 13, 2015		
The Jackbox Party Pack 3	Party; trivia	Jackbox Games	Jackbox Games	Unreleased	Oct 18, 2016	Oct 19, 2016		
The Jackbox Party Pack 4	Party; trivia	Jackbox Games	Jackbox Games	Unreleased	Oct 20, 2017	Oct 20, 2017		
The Jackbox Party Pack 5	Party; trivia	Jackbox Games	Jackbox Games	Unreleased	Oct 16, 2018	Oct 16, 2018		
The Jackbox Party Pack 6	Party; trivia	Jackbox Games	Jackbox Games	Unreleased	Oct 17, 2019	Oct 17, 2019		
The Jackbox Party Pack 7	Party; trivia	Jackbox Games	Jackbox Games	Unreleased	Oct 15, 2020	Oct 15, 2020		
The Jackbox Party Pack 8	Party; trivia	Jackbox Games	Jackbox Games	Unreleased	Oct 14, 2021	Oct 14, 2021		
The Jackbox Party Pack 9	Party; trivia	Jackbox Games	Jackbox Games	Unreleased	Oct 20, 2022	Oct 20, 2022		
The Jackbox Party Pack 10	Party; trivia	Jackbox Games	Jackbox Games	Unreleased	Oct 2, 2023	Oct 2, 2023		
The Jackbox Party Pack 11	Party; trivia	Jackbox Games	Jackbox Games	Unreleased	Oct 23, 2025	Oct 23, 2025		
The Jackbox Party Starter	Party; trivia	Jackbox Games	Jackbox Games	Unreleased	Jun 30, 2022	Jun 30, 2022		
The Jackbox Survey Scramble	Party; trivia	Jackbox Games	Jackbox Games	Unreleased	Oct 24, 2024	Oct 24, 2024		
Jagged Alliance: Rage!	Turn-based tactics	Cliffhanger Productions	HandyGames	Unreleased	Dec 6, 2018	Dec 6, 2018		
Jamestown+	Shoot 'em up	Final Form Games	Final Form Games	Unreleased	Mar 17, 2015	Mar 17, 2015		
Japanese Rail Sim: Journey to Kyoto	Simulation	Sonic Powered	Sonic Powered	Dec 10, 2020	Unreleased	Unreleased		
Jazzpunk: Director's Cut	Adventure, art	Necrophone Games	Adult Swim Games	Unreleased	Sep 20, 2016	Oct 19, 2016		
Jay and Silent Bob: Mall Brawl	Beat 'em up	Sponny Bard Productions	Interabang Entertainment	Unreleased	May 20, 2021	May 20, 2021		
Jenny LeClue: Detectivú	Adventure, puzzle	Mografi	Mografi	Unreleased	TBA	TBA		
Jeopardy!	Quiz	Frima Studio	Ubisoft	Unreleased	Nov 7, 2017	Nov 7, 2017		
Jet Car Stunts	Racing	Grip Digital	Grip Digital	Unreleased	May 6, 2014	May 6, 2014		
Jetpack Joyride	Platform	Big Ant Studios	Big Ant Studios	Unreleased	Apr 26, 2016	Apr 26, 2016		
Jet Set Knights	Avtion-platform	FobTi interactive	Ratalaika Games	Sep 24, 2020	Sep 22, 2020	Sep 23, 2020		
Jett: The Far Shore	Action-adventure	Superbrothers; Pine Scented	Superbrothers	Oct 5, 2021	Oct 5, 2021	Oct 5, 2021		
Jikkyou Powerful Pro Baseball 2016	Sports	Konami	Konami	Apr 28, 2016	Unreleased	Unreleased		
Jikkyou Powerful Pro Baseball 2018	Sports	Konami	Konami	Apr 28, 2018	Unreleased	Unreleased	P VR	
Jinki Resurrection	Visual novel	Giga	Entergram	Feb 25, 2021	Unreleased	Unreleased		
Jisei: The First Case HD	Visual novel	Sakevisual	Ratalaika Games	Jan 5, 2022	Jul 21, 2020	Jul 22, 2020		
Joe Dever's Lone Wolf	Role-playing	Forge Reply	505 Games	Unreleased	Mar 16, 2016	Mar 16, 2016		
John Wick Hex	Action; strategy	Bithell Games	Good Shepherd Entertainment	Unreleased	May 5, 2020	May 5, 2020		
JoJo's Bizarre Adventure: All Star Battle R	Fighting	CyberConnect2	Bandai Namco Entertainment	Sep 2, 2022	Sep 2, 2022	Sep 2, 2022		
JoJo's Bizarre Adventure: Eyes of Heaven	Fighting	CyberConnect2	Bandai Namco Entertainment	Dec 17, 2015	Jun 28, 2016	Jul 1, 2016		
Jotun: Valhalla Edition	Action-adventure	Thunder Lotus Games	Thunder Lotus Games	Sep 9, 2016	Sep 9, 2016	Sep 9, 2016		
Journey	Action-adventure	That Game Company	Sony Computer Entertainment	Jul 23, 2015	Jul 21, 2015	Jul 21, 2015		
Journey to the Savage Planet	Adventure; metroidvania	Typhoon Studios	505 Games	Jan 28, 2020	Jan 28, 2020	Jan 28, 2020		
Joysound Dive 2	Karaoke, music	Xing Entertainment	Xing Entertainment	Feb 22, 2014	Unreleased	Unreleased		
Judgment	Action-adventure	Sega	Sega	Dec 13, 2018	Jun 25, 2019	Jun 25, 2019	P	
Jumanji: The Video Game	Adventure	Funsolve	Bandai Namco; Outright Games	Unreleased	Nov 15, 2019	Nov 15, 2019		
Jump Force	Fighting	Spike Chunsoft	Bandai Namco Entertainment	Feb 14, 2019	Feb 15, 2019	Feb 15, 2019		
Jump King	Platform-adventure	Nexile	Ukiyo Publishing	Dec 16, 2020	Jun 9, 2020	Jun 9, 2020		
Jump Stars	Action, party	Jamit Games	Curve Digital	Unreleased	Jun 9, 2017	Jun 9, 2017		
Jurassic World Evolution	Simulation	Frontier Developments	Frontier Developments	Nov 28, 2018	Jun 12, 2018	Jun 12, 2018		
Just Cause 3	Action-adventure	Avalanche Studios	Square Enix	Jan 21, 2016	Dec 1, 2015	Dec 1, 2015		
Just Cause 4	Action-adventure	Avalanche Studios	Square Enix	Dec 4, 2018	Dec 4, 2018	Dec 4, 2018		
Just Dance 2014	Music; rhythm	Ubisoft Paris	Ubisoft	Unreleased	Nov 15, 2013	Nov 29, 2013	C M	
Just Dance 2015	Music; rhythm	Ubisoft Paris	Ubisoft	Unreleased	Oct 21, 2014	Oct 23, 2014	C M	
Just Dance 2016	Music; rhythm	Ubisoft Paris	Ubisoft	Unreleased	Oct 20, 2015	Oct 22, 2015	C M	
Just Dance 2017	Music; rhythm	Ubisoft Paris	Ubisoft	Unreleased	Oct 25, 2016	Oct 27, 2016	C M	
Just Dance 2018	Music; rhythm	Ubisoft Paris	Ubisoft	Unreleased	Oct 24, 2017	Oct 27, 2017	C M	
Just Dance 2019	Music; rhythm	Ubisoft Paris	Ubisoft	Unreleased	Oct 26, 2018	Oct 23, 2018	C M	
Just Dance 2020	Music; rhythm	Ubisoft Paris	Ubisoft	Unreleased	Nov 5, 2019	Nov 5, 2019	C M	
Just Dance 2021	Music; rhythm	Ubisoft Paris	Ubisoft	Nov 23, 2020	Nov 12, 2020	Nov 12, 2020	CB C M	
Just Dance 2022	Music; rhythm	Ubisoft Paris	Ubisoft	Nov 4, 2021	Nov 4, 2021	Nov 4, 2021	CB C M	
Just Deal With It!	Card game; party	Super Punk Games	Sony Interactive Entertainment	Unreleased	Nov 14, 2018	Nov 14, 2018	PL	
Just Die Already	Action-adventure	DoubleMoose	Curve Digital	Unreleased	May 20, 2021	May 20, 2021		
Just Shapes & Beats	Action rhythm	Berzerk Studios	Berzerk Studios	?	May 10, 2019	May 10, 2019		
Just Sing	Rhythm	iNiS	Ubisoft	Unreleased	Sep 6, 2016	Sep 6, 2016		
Jydge	Shooter	10tons	10tons	Unreleased	Oct 3, 2017	Oct 4, 2017	CB	
Kamaitachi no Yoru ×3	Visual novel		JP: Spike Chunsoft	Sep 19, 2024	Unreleased	Unreleased		
Kandagawa Jet Girls	Racing	Honey Parade Games	JP: Marvelous; WW: Marvelous	Jan 16, 2020	Aug 18, 2020	Aug 4, 2020		
Kamen Rider: Battride War Genesis	Action, beat 'em up	Eighting	Bandai Namco Entertainment	Feb 25, 2016	Unreleased	Unreleased		
Kamen Rider: Climax Fighters	Fighting	Eighting	Bandai Namco Entertainment	Dec 7, 2017	Unreleased	Unreleased		
Kamen Rider: Memory of Heroez	Action	Bandai Namco	Bandai Namco Entertainment	Oct 29, 2020	Unreleased	Unreleased		
Kamiko	Action	Skipmore	Flyhigh Works	Jun 27, 2019	Mar 19, 2020	Apr 24, 2020		
Kamiwaza: Way of the Thief	Stealth	Acquire	JP: Acquire; WW: NIS America	Oct 13, 2022	Oct 11, 2022	Oct 14, 2022		
Kao the Kangaroo	Platform	Tate Multimedia	Tate Multimedia	May 27, 2022	May 27, 2022	May 27, 2022		
Karumaruka Circle	Visual novel	Saga Planets	Entergram	May 24, 2018	Unreleased	Unreleased		
Katamari Damacy Reroll	Puzzle; action	Bandai Namco	Bandai Namco	Nov 19, 2020	Nov 20, 2020	Nov 20, 2020		
Katana Kami: A Way of the Samurai Story	Role-playing; hack and slash	Acquire	Spike Chunsoft	Feb 20, 2020	Feb 20, 2020	Feb 20, 2020		
Kaze and the Wild Masks	Platform	PixelHive	Soedesco	Aug 4, 2021	Mar 26, 2021	Mar 26, 2021		
Keep Talking and Nobody Explodes	Puzzle	Steel Crate Games	Steel Crate Games	May 30, 2019	Aug 16, 2018	Aug 16, 2018	VR	
Ken Follett's The Pillars of the Earth	Adventure	Daedalic Entertainment	Daedalic Entertainment	Aug 15, 2017	Aug 15, 2017	Aug 15, 2017		
Kena: Bridge of Spirits	Adventure	Ember Lab	Ember Lab	Sep 21, 2021	Sep 21, 2021	Sep 21, 2021	CB	
Kentucky Route Zero: TV Edition	Adventure	Cardboard Computer	Annapurna Interactive	Jan 29, 2020	Jan 28, 2020	Jan 28, 2020		
Kerbal Space Program	Simulation	Squad	Squad	Unreleased	Jan 16, 2018	Jan 16, 2018		
Kerbal Space Program 2	Simulation	Squad; Star Theory Games	Private Division	Unreleased	TBA	TBA		
Kero Blaster	Platform	Studio Pixel	Playism	Apr 11, 2017	Apr 11, 2017	Apr 11, 2017		
Ketsui Deathtiny: Kizuna Jigoku Tachi	Shoot 'em up	Cave; M2	M2	Nov 29, 2018	Unreleased	Nov 20, 2020		
Kholat	Survival horror	Imgn Pro	Imgn Pro	Jun 9, 2015	Jun 9, 2015	Jun 9, 2015		
Kick Off Revival	Sports	Dino Dini	The Digital Lounge	Unreleased	Mar 7, 2017	Jun 24, 2016		
KickBeat: Special Edition	Music, rhythm	Zen Studios	Zen Studios	Unreleased	Sep 16, 2014	Sep 16, 2014	3D	
Killing Floor 2	First-person shooter	Tripwire Interactive	Iceberg Interactive	Unreleased	Nov 18, 2016	Nov 18, 2016	P	
Killing Floor: Double Feature	First-person shooter	Tripwire Interactive	Tripwire Interactive	Unreleased	May 21, 2019	May 21, 2019	P VR	
Kill It With Fire	Simulation	Case Donnella Games	tinyBuild	Unreleased	Mar 4, 2021	Mar 4, 2021		
Kill la Kill: If	Fighting	A+ Games	EU: PQube; WW: Arc System Works	Jul 25, 2019	Jul 26, 2019	Jul 26, 2019		
Killzone: Shadow Fall	First-person shooter	Guerrilla Games	Sony Computer Entertainment	Feb 22, 2014	Nov 15, 2013	Nov 29, 2013		
Kingdom Come: Deliverance	Action role-playing	Warhorse Studios	Deep Silver	Jul 18, 2019	Feb 13, 2018	Feb 13, 2018	P	
Kingdom Hearts HD 1.5 + 2.5 Remix	Action role-playing	Square Enix	Square Enix	Mar 9, 2017	Mar 28, 2017	Mar 31, 2017	P	
Kingdom Hearts HD 2.8 Final Chapter Prologue	Action role-playing	Square Enix	Square Enix	Jan 12, 2017	Jan 24, 2017	Jan 24, 2017	P	
Kingdom Hearts III	Action role-playing	Square Enix	Square Enix	Jan 25, 2019	Jan 29, 2019	Jan 29, 2019	P	
Kingdom Hearts: Melody of Memory	Role-playing; music; rhythm	Square Enix	Square Enix	Nov 11, 2020	Nov 13, 2020	Nov 13, 2020		
Kingdom Hearts: The Story So Far	Action role-playing	Square Enix	Square Enix	Unreleased	Oct 30, 2018	Mar 29, 2019		
Kingdom of Night	Action role-playing	Black Seven Studios	Dangen Entertainment	TBA	TBA	TBA		
Kingdom: New Lands	Adventure; strategy	Noio	Raw Fury	Jan 25, 2018	Jan 16, 2018	Jan 16, 2018		
Kingdom: Two Crowns	Adventure; strategy	Noio	Raw Fury	Dec 12, 2018	Dec 12, 2018	Dec 11, 2018	P	
Kingdoms of Amalur: Re-Reckoning	Role-playing; hack-and-slash	Kaiko	THQ Nordic	Sep 8, 2020	Sep 8, 2020	Sep 8, 2020	P	
Kingmaker: Rise to the Throne	Puzzle; hidden object	Cordelia Games	Artifex Mundi	Unreleased	Dec 14, 2018	Dec 14, 2018		
King Oddball	Puzzle	10tons	10tons	Unreleased	Feb 4, 2014	Jan 8, 2014	CB	
The King of Fighters 2002 Unlimited Match	Fighting	Code Mystics	SNK	Feb 8, 2021	Feb 8, 2021	Feb 8, 2021		
The King of Fighters '97 Global Match	Fighting	SNK	SNK	Apr 3, 2018	Apr 3, 2018	Apr 3, 2018	CP	
The King of Fighters XIV	Fighting	SNK	SNK	Aug 25, 2016	Aug 23, 2016	Aug 26, 2016	P	
The King of Fighters XV	Fighting	SNK	SNK	Feb 17, 2022	Feb 17, 2022	Feb 17, 2022	P	
King of Seas	Action-role playing	3DClouds	Team17	Unreleased	May 25, 2021	May 25, 2021		
Kingpin: Reloaded	First-person shooter	Slipgate Ironworks	3D Realms	Unreleased	TBA	TBA	P	
King's Bounty II	Tactical role-playing	1C Company	Prime Matter	Aug 23, 2021	Aug 24, 2021	Aug 24, 2021		
Kings of Lorn: The Fall of Ebris	Action-adventure	TeamKill Media; Micah Jones	TeamKill Media	Feb 20, 2020	Feb 20, 2019	Mar 11, 2020		
King's Quest	Adventure	The Odd Gentlemen	Sierra Entertainment	Unreleased	Jul 28, 2015	Jul 28, 2015		
Kin'iro Loveriche	Visual novel	Saga Planets	Entergram	Mar 26, 2020	Unreleased	Unreleased		
Kin'iro Loveriche: Golden Time	Visual novel	Saga Planets	Entergram	Feb 25, 2021	Unreleased	Unreleased		
Kitaria Fables	Action-adventure; role-playing	Twin Hearts	PQube	Unreleased	Sep 3, 2021	Sep 3, 2021		
Kitty Powers' Matchmaker	Simulation	Magic Notion	Stellar Entertainment	Unreleased	Feb 7, 2017	Feb 7, 2017		
Klaus	Platform	La Cosa Entertainment	La Cosa Entertainment	Unreleased	Jan 19, 2016	Jan 25, 2016		
Knack	Platform; beat 'em up	Japan Studio	Sony Computer Entertainment	Feb 22, 2014	Nov 15, 2013	Nov 29, 2013		
Knack 2	Platform; beat 'em up	Japan Studio	Sony Interactive Entertainment	Sep 28, 2017	Sep 5, 2017	Sep 5, 2017	P	
Knightin'+	Dungeon crawler	Muzt Die Studios	Ratalaika Games	Feb 20, 2020	Feb 18, 2020	Feb 19, 2020		
Knights and Bikes	Adventure, platform	Foam Sword	Double Fine Productions	Unreleased	Aug 27, 2019	Aug 27, 2019		
A Knight's Quest	Action-adventure	Sky9 Games	Curve Digital	Unreleased	Oct 10, 2019	Oct 10, 2019		
Knock-Knock	Adventure; survival horror	Ice-Pick Lodge	Ice-Pick Lodge	Unreleased	Sep 10, 2015	Sep 10, 2015		
Knockout City	Sports	Velan Studios	Electronic Arts	May 21, 2021	May 21, 2021	May 21, 2021		
Knot	Puzzle	Warlock Arts	Warlock Arts	Unreleased	Sep 13, 2016	Jul 19, 2016		
Knowledge is Power	Party; quiz	Wish Studios	Sony Interactive Entertainment	Unreleased	Nov 22, 2017	Nov 22, 2017	PL	
Knowledge is Power: Decades	Party; quiz	Wish Studios	Sony Interactive Entertainment	Unreleased	Nov 14, 2018	Nov 14, 2018	PL	
Koi	Adventure, puzzle	Dotoyou	Oasis Games	Apr 27, 2017	Apr 19, 2016	May 3, 2016		
Koihime Enbu	Fighting	Yeti	BaseSon	Jan 28, 2016	Unreleased	Unreleased		
Koihime Enbu RyoRaiRai	Fighting	Unknown Games; M2	Degica Games	Jul 13, 2018	Jul 13, 2018	Jul 12, 2018		
Kona	Adventure; survival	Parabole Studios	Ravenscourt	Unreleased	Mar 17, 2017	Mar 17, 2017	VR	
Kotodama: The 7 Mysteries of Fujisawa	Visual novel	Art Co., Ltd	PQube	Unreleased	Jun 4, 2019	May 31, 2019		
Kowloon's Rhizome: A Day of the Fire	Adventure	MCF; Uani Studio	Uani Studio	TBA	Unreleased	Unreleased		
Krinkle Krusher	Tower defense	Ilusis Interactive Graphics	Ilusis Interactive Graphic	Unreleased	Apr 7, 2015	Aug 5, 2016		
Kromaia Omega	Shoot 'em up	Kraken Empire	Rising Star Games	Mar 2, 2017	Nov 10, 2015	Nov 10, 2015		
Kunio-kun: The World Classics Collection	Action	Arc System Works	Arc System Works	Dec 20, 2018	Unreleased	Unreleased		
Kwaidan: Azuma Manor Story	Action-adventure	Gudouan	Mediascape	Jun 15, 2019	Dec 13, 2019	Dec 13, 2019		
Labyrinth Life	Role-playing	Matrix Software	D3 Publisher	Aug 1, 2019	Aug 1, 2019	Aug 1, 2019		
Labyrinth of Galleria: The Moon Society	Role-playing	Nippon Ichi Software	Nippon Ichi Software	Nov 26, 2020	Feb 14, 2023	Feb 17, 2023		
Labyrinth of Refrain: Coven of Dusk	Role-playing	Nippon Ichi Software	NIS America	Sep 28, 2017	Sep 18, 2018	Sep 21, 2018	P	
Labyrinth of Zangetsu	Role-playing	Acquire	Acquire	TBA	Unreleased	Unreleased		
LA Cops	Action	Modern Dream	Team17	Unreleased	Apr 21, 2015	Apr 22, 2015		
Laid-Back Camp: Have a Nice Day!	Adventure	Mages	Mages	Nov 11, 2021	Unreleased	Unreleased		
Laid-Back Camp -Virtual- Fumoto Campsite	Adventure	Gemdrops	Gemdrops	Apr 8, 2021	Unreleased	Unreleased		
Laid-Back Camp -Virtual- Lake Motosu	Adventure	Gemdrops	Gemdrops	Mar 4, 2021	Mar 3, 2021	Mar 4, 2021		
Laika: Aged Through Blood	Metroidvania	Brainwash Gang	Headup Games	Dec 5, 2023	Dec 5, 2023	Dec 5, 2023		
Lair of the Clockwork God	Point-and-click; platform	Size Five Games	Size Five Games	Unreleased	Nov 6, 2020	Nov 6, 2020		
L.A. Noire	Action-adventure	Team Bondi	Rockstar Games	Nov 14, 2017	Nov 14, 2017	Nov 14, 2017	P	
La-Mulana	Platform-adventure	GR3 Project; Nigoro	JP: Playism; WW: NIS America	Jun 27, 2019	Mar 17, 2020	Mar 20, 2020		
La-Mulana 2	Platform-adventure	GR3 Project; Nigoro	JP: Playism; WW: NIS America	Jun 27, 2019	Mar 17, 2020	Mar 20, 2020		
Langrisser I & II HD Remastered	Tactical role-playing	Chara-Ani	JP: Kadokawa Games; WW: NIS America	Apr 18, 2019	Mar 10, 2020	Mar 13, 2020		
The Language of Love	Visual novel	ebi-hime	Ratalaika Games	Unreleased	Oct 30, 2020	Oct 30, 2020		
Lapis x Labyrinth	Role-playing	NIS America	NIS America	May 28, 2019	May 28, 2019	May 28, 2019		
Lara Croft and the Temple of Osiris	Action; platform	Crystal Dynamics	Square Enix	Dec 25, 2014	Dec 9, 2014	Dec 9, 2014		
Lara Croft Go	Puzzle	Square Enix Montréal	Square Enix	Unreleased	Dec 3, 2016	Dec 3, 2016		
Laser League	Sports	Roll7	505 Games	Unreleased	May 10, 2018	May 10, 2018		
Laserlife	Rhythm	Choice Provisions	Choice Provisions	Unreleased	Sep 22, 2015	Sep 22, 2015		
The Last Blade 2	Fighting	Code Mystics	SNK Playmore	May 24, 2016	May 24, 2016	May 24, 2016	CP	
The Last Campfire	Adventure	Hello Games	Hello Games	Aug 27, 2020	Aug 27, 2020	Aug 27, 2020		
The Last Cube	Adventure, puzzle	Improx Games	Improx Games	TBA	TBA	TBA		
Last Day of June	Adventure, puzzle	Ovosonico	505 Games	Nov 11, 2019	Aug 31, 2017	Aug 31, 2017		
The Last Door	Point-and-click adventure	Game Kitchen	Plug In Digital	Unreleased	May 23, 2019	May 23, 2019		
The Last Guardian	Adventure	GenDesign; SIE Japan	Sony Interactive Entertainment	Dec 6, 2016	Dec 6, 2016	Dec 7, 2016	P	
The Last Kids on Earth and the Staff of Doom	Action	Stage Clear Studios	Outright Games	Unreleased	Jun 4, 2021	Jun 4, 2021		
The Last Remnant Remastered	Adventure; role-playing	Square Enix	Square Enix	Dec 6, 2018	Dec 6, 2018	Dec 6, 2018		
The Last of Us Remastered	Action-adventure	Naughty Dog	Sony Computer Entertainment	Aug 21, 2014	Jul 29, 2014	Jul 30, 2014	P	
The Last of Us: Left Behind	Action-adventure	Naughty Dog	Sony Computer Entertainment	May 12, 2015	May 12, 2015	May 12, 2015	P	
The Last of Us Part II	Action-adventure	Naughty Dog	Sony Interactive Entertainment	Jun 19, 2020	Jun 19, 2020	Jun 19, 2020	P	
The Last Stand: Aftermath	Roguelike	Con Artist Games	Armor Games Studios	Nov 16, 2021	Nov 16, 2021	Nov 16, 2021		
Last Stop	Adventure	Variable State	Annapurna Interactive	Jul 22, 2021	Jul 22, 2021	Jul 22, 2021		
The Last Tinker: City of Colors	3D Platform	Loot Interactive	Unity Games	Unreleased	Aug 19, 2014	Aug 20, 2014		
Late Shift	Adventure, FMV	CtrlMovies	Wales Interactive	Jun 20, 2019	Apr 18, 2017	Apr 18, 2017		
LawBreakers	First-person shooter	Boss Key Productions	Nexon	Unreleased	Aug 8, 2017	Aug 8, 2017	P	
Laws of Machine	Platform, puzzle	Badri Bebua	Badri Bebua	Unreleased	Oct 17, 2017	Oct 17, 2017		
Layers of Fear	Psychological horror	Bloober Team	Aspyr	Oct 13, 2016	Feb 16, 2016	Feb 16, 2016		
Layers of Fear 2	Psychological horror	Bloober Team	Gun Media	Nov 21, 2019	May 28, 2019	May 28, 2019		
League of Legends: Wild Rift	Multiplayer online battle arena	Riot Games	Riot Games	TBA	TBA	TBA		
Leap of Fate	Action, rogue-like	Clever Plays	Clever Plays	Jan 26, 2018	Jul 11, 2018	Unreleased	P	
Leaving Lyndow	Adventure	Eastshade Studios	Eastshade Studios	Unreleased	Jul 27, 2017	Unreleased		
Left Alive	Action, survival	Square Enix	Square Enix	Feb 28, 2019	Mar 5, 2019	Mar 5, 2019		
Legacy of Kain: Soul Reaver 1 & 2 Remastered	Action-adventure	Aspyr	Aspyr	Unreleased	Dec 10, 2024	Dec 10, 2024		
The Legend of Heroes: Trails Beyond the Horizon	Role-playing	Nihon Falcom	JP: Nihon Falcom; WW: NIS America	Sep 26, 2024	Jan 15, 2026	Jan 15, 2026		
The Legend of Heroes: Trails from Zero	Role-playing	Nihon Falcom	JP: Nihon Falcom; WW: NIS America	Apr 23, 2020	Sep 27, 2022	Sep 30, 2022		
The Legend of Heroes: Trails into Reverie	Role-playing	Nihon Falcom	JP: Nihon Falcom; WW: NIS America	Aug 27, 2020	Jul 7, 2023	Jul 7, 2023		
The Legend of Heroes: Trails of Cold Steel	Role-playing	Nihon Falcom	JP: Nihon Falcom; WW: Xseed Games	Mar 8, 2018	Mar 26, 2019	Mar 29, 2019	P	
The Legend of Heroes: Trails of Cold Steel II	Role-playing	Nihon Falcom	JP: Nihon Falcom; WW: Xseed Games	Apr 26, 2018	Jun 4, 2019	Jun 7, 2019	P	
The Legend of Heroes: Trails of Cold Steel III	Role-playing	Nihon Falcom	JP: Nihon Falcom; WW: NIS America	Sep 28, 2017	Oct 22, 2019	Oct 22, 2019	P	
The Legend of Heroes: Trails of Cold Steel IV	Role-playing	Nihon Falcom	JP: Nihon Falcom; WW: NIS America	Sep 27, 2018	Oct 27, 2020	Oct 27, 2020		
The Legend of Heroes: Trails Through Daybreak	Role-playing	Nihon Falcom	JP: Nihon Falcom; WW: NIS America	Sep 30, 2021	Jul 5, 2024	Jul 5, 2024		
The Legend of Heroes: Trails Through Daybreak II	Role-playing	Nihon Falcom	JP: Nihon Falcom; WW: NIS America	Sep 29, 2022	Feb 14, 2025	Feb 14, 2025		
The Legend of Heroes: Trails to Azure	Role-playing	Nihon Falcom	JP: Nihon Falcom; WW: NIS America	May 28, 2020	Mar 14, 2023	Mar 17, 2023		
Legend of Kay Anniversary	Platform	Unit 4 Games	Nordic Games	Unreleased	Jul 28, 2015	Jul 28, 2015		
The Legend of Korra	Action-adventure	PlatinumGames	Activision	Unreleased	Oct 22, 2014	Oct 22, 2014		
Legend of Mana	Action role-playing	Square Enix	Square Enix	Jun 24, 2021	Jun 24, 2021	Jun 24, 2021		
The Legend of Nayuta: Boundless Trails	Action role-playing	Nihon Falcom	JP: Nihon Falcom; WW: NIS America	Jun 24, 2021	Sep 19, 2023	Sep 22, 2023		
Lego Batman 3: Beyond Gotham	Action-adventure	TT Games	WB Games	Apr 2, 2015	Nov 11, 2014	Nov 14, 2014		
Lego Brawls	Action-adventure	Red games	Bandai Namco Entertainment	Sep 2, 2022	Sep 2, 2022	Sep 2, 2022		
Lego Builder's Journey	Puzzle	Light Brick Studio	Lego Games	Apr 19, 2022	Apr 19, 2022	Apr 19, 2022		
Lego City Undercover	Action-adventure	TT Games	WB Games	Jun 29, 2017	Apr 4, 2017	Apr 7, 2017		
Lego DC Super-Villains	Action-adventure	TT Games	WB Games	Oct 25, 2018	Oct 16, 2018	Oct 19, 2018		
Lego Dimensions	Action-adventure	TT Games	WB Games	Unreleased	Sep 27, 2015	Sep 29, 2015		
Lego Harry Potter Collection	Action-adventure	TT Games	WB Games	Unreleased	Oct 18, 2016	Oct 21, 2016	P	
Lego The Hobbit	Action-adventure	TT Games	WB Games	Unreleased	Apr 8, 2014	Apr 11, 2014		
Lego Jurassic World	Action-adventure	TT Games	WB Games	Nov 5, 2015	Jun 12, 2015	Jun 2, 2015		
Lego Marvel Super Heroes	Action-adventure	TT Games	WB Games	Jan 22, 2015	Nov 15, 2013	Nov 29, 2013		
Lego Marvel Super Heroes 2	Action-adventure	TT Games	WB Games	Feb 1, 2018	Nov 14, 2017	Nov 14, 2017		
Lego Marvel's Avengers	Action-adventure	TT Games	WB Games	Jan 16, 2016	Jan 16, 2016	Jan 16, 2016		
Lego Movie Videogame	Action-adventure	TT Games	WB Games	Nov 6, 2014	Feb 7, 2014	Feb 7, 2014		
Lego Movie Videogame 2	Action-adventure	TT Games	WB Games	Mar 28, 2019	Feb 26, 2019	Mar 1, 2019		
Lego Ninjago Movie Video Game	Action-adventure	TT Games	WB Games	Sep 22, 2017	Sep 22, 2017	Sep 22, 2017		
Lego Party	Party	SMG Studio	Fictions	Sep 30, 2025	Sep 30, 2025	Sep 30, 2025		
Lego Star Wars: The Force Awakens	Action-adventure	TT Games	WB Games	Oct 13, 2016	Jun 28, 2016	Jun 28, 2016		
Lego Star Wars: The Skywalker Saga	Action-adventure	TT Games	WB Games	Apr 5, 2022	Apr 5, 2022	Apr 5, 2022		
Lego Voyagers	Puzzle; Platformer	Light Brick Studio	Annapurna Interactive	Sep 25, 2025	Sep 25, 2025	Sep 25, 2025		
Lego Worlds	Action-adventure	TT Games	WB Games	Apr 6, 2017	Mar 7, 2017	Mar 4, 2017	P	
Legrand Legacy: Tale of the Fatebounds	Role-playing	Semisoft	Another Indie	Unreleased	Oct 3, 2019	Oct 3, 2019		
Leo's Fortune: HD Edition	Platform, puzzle	Tilting Point	1337 & Senri	Unreleased	Sep 8, 2015	Sep 8, 2015		
Leisure Suit Larry: Wet Dreams Don't Dry	Adventure	CrazyBunch	Assemble Entertainment	Unreleased	Jun 19, 2020	Jun 13, 2020		
Leisure Suit Larry: Wet Dreams Dry Twice	Adventure	CrazyBunch	Assemble Entertainment	Unreleased	May 18, 2021	May 18, 2021		
Lemnis Gate	First-person shooter	Ratloop Games Canada	Frontier Foundry	Unreleased	Sep 28, 2021	Sep 28, 2021		
Lethal League	Fighting	Team Reptile	Team Reptile	May 10, 2017	May 9, 2017	May 10, 2017		
Lethal League Blaze	Fighting	Team Reptile	JP: Oizumi Amuzio; WW: Team Reptile	Jul 12, 2019	Jul 12, 2019	Jul 12, 2019		
Let's Sing 2020	Music	Voxler	Ravenscourt	Unreleased	Oct 28, 2019	Oct 25, 2019		
Let's Sing 2021	Music	Voxler	Ravenscourt	Nov 12, 2020	Nov 13, 2020	Nov 13, 2020		
Let's Sing Country	Music	Voxler	Deep Silver	Unreleased	Oct 25, 2019	Unreleased		
Let's Sing Queen	Music	Voxler	Ravenscourt	Oct 2, 2020	Oct 2, 2020	Oct 2, 2020		
The Letter: Classic Edition	Adventure	TreeFall Studios	TreeFall Studios	Unreleased	Nov 8, 2022	Nov 8, 2022		
Letter Quest Remastered	Puzzle	Bacon Bandit Games	Digerati	Unreleased	May 17, 2016	May 18, 2016		
Let Them Come	Shooter	Tuatara Games	Versus Evil	Unreleased	Dec 8, 2017	Dec 8, 2017		
Lichdom: Battlemage	Action role-playing	Xaviant	Maximum Games	Unreleased	Apr 19, 2016	Apr 22, 2016		
Lichtspeer: Double Speer Edition	Action	Lichthund	Crunching Koalas	Jul 9, 2019	Sep 27, 2016	Apr 11, 2017		
Life Goes On: Done to Death	Platform; puzzle	Infinite Monkeys Entertainment	Infinite Monkeys Entertainment	Aug 9, 2016	May 17, 2016	May 17, 2016		
Life Is Strange	Action-adventure	Dontnod Entertainment	Square Enix	Mar 2, 2016	Jan 30, 2015	Jan 30, 2015		
Life Is Strange 2	Adventure	Dontnod Entertainment	Square Enix	Mar 26, 2020	Sep 26, 2018	Sep 26, 2018	P	
Life Is Strange: Before the Storm	Action-adventure	Deck Nine Games	Square Enix	Aug 31, 2017	Aug 31, 2017	Aug 31, 2017	P	
Life Is Strange: True Colors	Adventure	Deck Nine	Square Enix	Sep 10, 2021	Sep 10, 2021	Sep 10, 2021		
Lifeless Planet	Adventure	Stage 2 Studios	Serenity Forge	Aug 16, 2016	Aug 16, 2016	Aug 16, 2016		
Light Fairytale Episode 1	Role-playing	Neko Works	Neko Works	Unreleased	Nov 5, 2019	Nov 26, 2019	P	
Like a Dragon: Infinite Wealth	Role-playing	Ryu Ga Gotoku Studio	Sega	Jan 26, 2024	Jan 26, 2024	Jan 26, 2024		
Like a Dragon: Ishin!	Action-adventure; hack and slash	Ryu Ga Gotoku Studio	Sega	Feb 22, 2023	Feb 21, 2023	Feb 21, 2023		
Like a Dragon: Pirate Yakuza in Hawaii	Role-Playing	Ryu Ga Gotoku Studio	Sega	Feb 21, 2025	Feb 21, 2025	Feb 21, 2025		
Like a Dragon Gaiden: The Man Who Erased His Name	Action-adventure	Ryu Ga Gotoku Studio	Sega	Nov 9, 2023	Nov 9, 2023	Nov 9, 2023		
Lil' Guardsman	Puzzle	Hilltop Studios	Versus Evil, TinyBuild	Unreleased	Jan 23, 2024	Jan 23, 2024		
Limbo	Platform	Double Eleven	Playdead	Feb 24, 2015	Feb 24, 2015	Feb 24, 2015		
Linelight	Puzzle	My Dog Zorro	Brett Taylor Interactive	Unreleased	Jan 31, 2017	Jan 31, 2017		
Link: The Unleashed Nexus – Restructured Heaven	Action	Reminisce	Reminisce	TBA	TBA	TBA		
Link-a-Pix Deluxe	Nonogram; puzzle	Lightwood Games	JP: EastAsiaSoft; WW: Lightwood Games	Jan 16, 2020	Jan 7, 2020	Jan 7, 2020		
Lisa: Definitive Edition	Role-playing	Dingaling Productions	Serenity Forge	Unreleased	Jul 18, 2023	Jul 18, 2023		
Lithium: Inmate 39	Horror, puzzle	CanuArts	CanuArts	Unreleased	Oct 25, 2016	May 31, 2017		
The Little Acre	Graphic adventure	Pewter Games	Curve Digital	Dec 13, 2016	Dec 13, 2016	Dec 13, 2016		
Little Big Workshop	Construction and management	Mirage Game Studios	HandyGames	Unreleased	Sep 23, 2020	Sep 24, 2020		
LittleBigPlanet 3	Platform, puzzle	Sumo Digital	Sony Computer Entertainment	Dec 4, 2014	Nov 18, 2014	Nov 19, 2014	C M	
Little Devil Inside	Action-adventure	Neostream Interactive	Neostream Interactive	TBA	TBA	TBA		
Little Misfortune	Adventure; horror	Killmonday Games	Killmonday Games	Unreleased	May 29, 2020	May 29, 2020		
Little Nightmares	Action-adventure	Tarsier Studios	Bandai Namco Entertainment	Apr 28, 2017	Apr 28, 2017	Apr 28, 2017	P	
Little Nightmares II	Action-adventure	Tarsier Studios	Bandai Namco Entertainment	Feb 11, 2021	Feb 11, 2021	Feb 11, 2021	CB P	
Little Nightmares III	Action-adventure	Supermassive Games	Bandai Namco Entertainment	Oct 10, 2025	Oct 10, 2025	Oct 10, 2025		
Little Town Hero	Role-playing	Game Freak	NIS America	Apr 23, 2020	Jun 23, 2020	Jun 26, 2020		
Little Witch Academia: Chamber of Time	Role-playing	A+ Games	Bandai Namco Entertainment	Nov 30, 2017	May 15, 2018	May 15, 2018		
Live A Live	Role-playing	Historia	Square Enix	Apr 27, 2023	Apr 27, 2023	Apr 27, 2023		
Livelock	Shoot 'em up	Tuque Games	Perfect World	Unreleased	Aug 2, 2016	Aug 31, 2016		
Lizard Lady vs. the Cats	Action-adventure	The Voices Games	The Voices Games	Unreleased	Feb 10, 2021	Feb 2, 2021		
Lock's Quest	Real-time strategy	Digital Continue	THQ Nordic	Unreleased	May 30, 2017	May 30, 2017		
LocoRoco Remastered	Platform; puzzle	Japan Studio	Sony Interactive Entertainment	May 9, 2017	May 9, 2017	May 9, 2017	P	
LocoRoco 2 Remastered	Platform; puzzle	Japan Studio	Sony Interactive Entertainment	Dec 9, 2017	Dec 9, 2017	Dec 9, 2017	P	
Lode Runner Legacy	Platform	Tozai Games	Limited Games	Jan 30, 2020	Jan 29, 2020	Jan 29, 2020		
Lonely Mountains: Downhill	Racing	Megagon Industries	Thunderful Publishing	Oct 26, 2020	Oct 23, 2019	Oct 23, 2019		
Lone Survivor: The Director's Cut	Survival horror	Superflat Games	Superflat Games	Unreleased	Oct 15, 2014	Oct 14, 2014		
The Long Dark	Survival	Hinterland Studio	Hinterland Studio	Unreleased	Aug 1, 2017	Aug 1, 2017		
Lornsword Winter Chronicle	Action; strategy	Tower Five	Tower Five	Unreleased	Oct 23, 2019	Oct 23, 2019		
Loot Rascals	Roguelike	Hollow Ponds	Hollow Ponds	Unreleased	Mar 7, 2017	Mar 7, 2017		
The Lord of the Rings: Adventure Card Game	Card & board	Fantasy Flight Games	Asmodee	Unreleased	Nov 5, 2019	Nov 5, 2019		
The Lord of the Rings: Gollum	Action-adventure	Daedalic Entertainment	Daedalic Entertainment	May 25, 2023	May 25, 2023	May 25, 2023		
Lords of the Fallen	Action role-playing	Deck13 Interactive	City Interactive	Oct 31, 2014	Oct 28, 2014	Oct 28, 2014		
Lost Castle	2D; action; rogue-like	Hunter Studio	Another Indie	Oct 3, 2019	Sep 19, 2019	Sep 19, 2019		
The Lost Child	Role-playing	Crim	JP: Kadokawa Games; WW: NIS America	Aug 24, 2017	Jun 19, 2018	Jun 22, 2018	P	
Lost Ember	Action-adventure	Mooneye Studios	Mooneye Studios	Nov 25, 2019	Nov 22, 2019	Nov 22, 2019		
Lost Grimoires: Stolen Kingdom	Puzzle; hidden object	Artifex Mundi	Artifex Mundi	Unreleased	Jul 25, 2017	Jul 25, 2017		
Lost Grimoires 2: Shard of Mystery	Puzzle; hidden object	Artifex Mundi	Artifex Mundi	Unreleased	Dec 15, 2017	Dec 15, 2017		
Lost in Random	Action-adventure	Zoink	Electronic Arts	Sep 10, 2021	Sep 10, 2021	Sep 10, 2021		
Lost Judgment	Action-adventure	Ryu Ga Gotoku Studio	Sega	Sep 24, 2021	Sep 24, 2021	Sep 24, 2021		
Lost Ruins	Survival	Altari Games	Dangen Entertainment	Unreleased	TBA	TBA		
Lost Orbit: Terminal Velocity	Adventure	Pixelnauts	Pixelnauts	Unreleased	May 13, 2015	May 12, 2015		
Lost Sea	Action-adventure	EastAsiaSoft	EastAsiaSoft	Jul 7, 2016	Jul 5, 2016	Jul 5, 2016		
Lost Soul Aside	Action	Yang Bing	Ultizero	Unreleased	TBA	TBA		
Lost Sphear	Role-playing	Tokyo RPG Factory	Square Enix	Oct 12, 2017	Jan 23, 2018	Jan 23, 2018	P	
Lost Wing	Arcade; combat racing	BoxFrog Games	2Awesome Studio	Dec 16, 2020	Jul 28, 2020	Jul 28, 2020		
Lost Words: Beyond the Page	Platform; puzzle	Sketchbook Games	Modus Games	Unreleased	Apr 5, 2021	Apr 5, 2021		
Lovecraft's Untold Stories	Action role-playing	Blini Games	BadLand Publishing		May 10, 2019	May 10, 2019		
Lovers in a Dangerous Spacetime	2D platform, action	Asteroid Base	Asteroid Base	Sep 28, 2016	Feb 9, 2016	Feb 9, 2016		
Lumines Remastered	Puzzle	Enhance Games	Enhance Games	Jun 26, 2018	Jun 26, 2018	Jun 26, 2018		
Lumini	Action-adventure	Speelbaars	2Awesome Studio	Mar 26, 2020	Jan 21, 2020	Jan 21, 2020		
Lumo	Action-adventure	Triple Eh?	Rising Star Games	Oct 20, 2016	May 24, 2016	May 24, 2016		
Luna	Puzzle	Funomena	Funomena	Aug 7, 2019	Jun 18, 2019	Jun 19, 2019	VR	
Lunar Remastered Collection	Role-playing	Game Arts	GungHo Online Entertainment	Apr 18, 2025	Apr 18, 2025	Apr 18, 2025		

== See also ==
- List of best-selling PlayStation 4 video games
