= List of Nintendo Switch games (C–G) =

This is part of the list of Nintendo Switch games.

== List ==
There are currently 4133 games across List of Nintendo Switch games (0–9), List of Nintendo Switch games (A–Am), List of Nintendo Switch games (An–Az), List of Nintendo Switch games (B), this page (C–G), List of Nintendo Switch games (H–P), and List of Nintendo Switch games (Q–Z).

List of Nintendo Switch games
Title	Developer(s)	Publisher(s)	Release date	Ref.
Cabela's: The Hunt Championship Edition	Saber Interactive	Planet Entertainment	October 23, 2018	
Cadence of Hyrule	Brace Yourself Games	JP: Spike Chunsoft; WW: Nintendo	June 13, 2019	
Café Enchanté	Otomate	JP: Idea Factory; WW: Aksys Games	October 10, 2019	
Cafeteria Nipponica	Kairosoft	Kairosoft	April 18, 2019	
Caged Garden Cock Robin	SEEC	SEEC	July 25, 2019	
Cake Bash	High Tea Frog	Coatsink	November 19, 2020	
Cake Laboratory	Square Heads Games	GrimTalin	December 20, 2018	
Caladrius Blaze	Moss	H2 Interactive	July 18, 2019	
Calico	Peachy Keen Games	Whitethorn Digital	December 15, 2020	
The Caligula Effect 2	Historia	JP: FuRyu; WW: NIS America	June 24, 2021	
The Caligula Effect: Overdose	Historia	JP: FuRyu; WW: NIS America	March 12, 2019	
Call of Cthulhu: The Official Video Game	Cyanide	JP: Oizumi Amuzio; WW: Focus Home Interactive	October 8, 2019	
Call of Juarez: Gunslinger	Techland	Techland	December 10, 2019	
Candle: The Power of the Flame	Teku Studios	Merge Games	July 26, 2018	
Candleman	Spotlighter Interactive	indienova	October 3, 2019	
Candy 2048 Challenge	Mindscape	Mindscape	December 25, 2020	
Candy Raid: The Factory	KR Game Studios	KR Game Studios	October 1, 2020	
Cannibal Cuisine	Rocket Vulture	Rocket Vulture	May 20, 2020	
Can't Drive This	Pixel Maniacs	Pixel Maniacs	March 19, 2021	
Capcom Arcade Stadium	Capcom	Capcom	February 17, 2021	
Capcom Arcade 2nd Stadium	Capcom	Capcom	July 22, 2022	
Capcom Beat 'Em Up Bundle	Capcom	Capcom	September 18, 2018	
Capcom Fighting Collection	Capcom	Capcom	June 24, 2022	
Capcom Fighting Collection 2	Capcom	Capcom	May 16, 2025	
Cape's Escape Game	AlignmentSharp	AlignmentSharp	November 19, 2020	
Cape's Escape Game: 2nd Room	AlignmentSharp	AlignmentSharp	February 18, 2021	
Cape's Escape Game: 2.5th Room	AlignmentSharp	AlignmentSharp	May 27, 2021	
Cape's Escape Game: 3rd Room	AlignmentSharp	AlignmentSharp	August 26, 2021	
Captain Sabertooth and the Magic Diamond	Ravn Studio	Zordix	November 20, 2020	
Captain StarOne	Marumittu	Flyhigh Works	February 7, 2019	
Captain Toad: Treasure Tracker	Nintendo EPD	Nintendo	July 13, 2018	
Captain Tsubasa: Rise of New Champions	Tamsoft	Bandai Namco Entertainment	August 27, 2020	
Car Mechanic Manager	Ultimate Games	Ultimate Games	May 7, 2019	
Car Mechanic Simulator 2018	ECC Games	ECC Games	February 15, 2019	
Car Trader	Ultimate Games	Ultimate Games	May 12, 2019	
Caravan Stories	Aiming	Aiming	March 18, 2021	
Carcassonne – Tiles & Tactics	Frima Studio	Twin Sails Interactive	December 6, 2018	
Card Shark	Nerial	Devolver Digital	June 2, 2022	
Cardaclysm: Shards of the Four	Elder Games	Headup	August 13, 2021	
Cardfight Vanguard EX	FuRyu	FuRyu	September 19, 2019	
Cardpocalypse	Gambrinous	Versus Evil	December 12, 2019	
Carebotz	Glasscannon Studio	Takacs Peter	December 20, 2021	
Caretaker	Baris Tarimcioglu	Playstige Interactive	July 16, 2020	
Carnival Games	Mass Media	2K	November 6, 2018	
Carrion	Phobia Game Studio	Devolver Digital	July 23, 2020	
Cars 3: Driven to Win	Avalanche Software	Warner Bros. Interactive Entertainment	June 13, 2017	
Carto	Sunhead Games	Humble Games	October 27, 2020	
Cartoon Network: Battle Crashers	Magic Pockets, Torus Games	GameMill Entertainment	October 31, 2017	
Case: Animatronics	Walnut	OOO Valnat	October 3, 2019	
Case Closed Skateboard Run: Phantom Thief Kid and the Mysterious Treasures	TMS Entertainment	TMS Entertainment	April 11, 2019	
A Case of Distrust	Serenity Forge	Serenity Forge	September 20, 2018	
The Case of the Golden Idol	Color Gray Games	Playstack	May 25, 2023	
The Casebook of Arkady Smith	Wobbly Tooth	Wobbly Tooth	April 16, 2020	
The Casino: Roulette, Video Poker, Slot Machines, Craps, Baccarat	Break	D3 Publisher	November 19, 2020	
Cassette Beasts	Bytten Studio	Raw Fury	May 25, 2023	
Castaway Paradise	Rokaplay	Rokaplay	April 29, 2021	
Castle Crashers Remastered	The Behemoth	The Behemoth	September 17, 2019	
Castle Kong	Drowning Monkeys	Drowning Monkeys	July 4, 2020	
Castle of Heart	7Levels	7Levels	March 23, 2018	
Castle of Shikigami2	Alfa System, Cosmo Machia	Degica Games	April 13, 2023	
CastleStorm	Zen Studios	Zen Studios	August 16, 2018	
CastleStorm II	Zen Studios	Zen Studios	September 23, 2020	
Castlevania Advance Collection	Konami	Konami	September 23, 2021	
Castlevania Anniversary Collection	Konami	Konami	May 16, 2019	
Castlevania: Belmont's Curse	Konami	Konami	October 15, 2026	
.Cat	Game Nacional	Game Nacional	April 10, 2021	
Cat Cafe Manager	Roost Games	Freedom Games	April 14, 2022	
Cat Girl Without Salad: Amuse-Bouche	WayForward	Humble Bundle	April 1, 2020	
.cat Milk	Bernardo Game Studio	Game Nacional	August 13, 2021	
Cat Quest	The Gentlebros	PQube	November 9, 2017	
Cat Quest II: The Lupine Empire	The Gentlebros	PQube	October 24, 2019	
Cat Quest III	The Gentlebros	Kepler Interactive	August 8, 2024	
Catan	Magic Pockets, Torus Games	Asmodee	June 20, 2019	
Catch a Duck	All Those Moments	Ultimate Games	July 29, 2019	
Caterpillar Royale	Starsign	Starsign	February 14, 2019	
Cathedral	Decemberborn Interactive	Elden Pixels	February 18, 2021	
Catherine: Full Body	Atlus	Atlus	July 2, 2020	
Cattails	Falcon Development	Falcon Development	November 29, 2018	
Cattails Wildwood Story	Falcon Development	Falcon Development	November 30, 2023	
Cave Bad	EastAsiaSoft, Panda Indie Studio	EastAsiaSoft	March 3, 2021	
Cave Story+	Nicalis	JP: Pikii; WW: Nicalis	June 20, 2017	
Caveblazers	Deadpan Games	Yogscast	January 10, 2019	
Caveman Tales	Cateia Games	Ocean Media	September 10, 2020	
Caveman Warriors	JanduSoft	JanduSoft	December 5, 2017	
Caves of Qud	Kitfox Games	Freehold Games	February 16, 2026	
Cecconoid	Triple Eh?	Thalamus Digital	August 17, 2020	
Cel Damage	Finish Line Games	Finish Line Games	March 28, 2019	
Celebrity Life	Gaming Factory	Gaming Factory	TBA	
Celeste	EXOK Games	Maddy Makes Games	January 25, 2018	
Cendrillon palikA	Idea Factory	Idea Factory	October 25, 2018	
The Centennial Case: A Shijima Story	h.a.n.d.	Square Enix	May 12, 2022	
Centipede: Recharged	Adamvision Studios, SneakyBox	Atari	September 29, 2021	
Chained Echoes	Ark Heiral	Deck13 Spotlight	December 8, 2022	
Chalk Dash Carnival	Sat Box	Sat Box	November 14, 2018	
Chameleon	Joyfulstar	NA: UFO Interactive; PAL: Tommo	November 26, 2019	
Champion Jockey Special	Koei Tecmo	Koei Tecmo	September 14, 2017	
Chaos on Deponia	Daedalic Entertainment	Daedalic Entertainment	November 27, 2019	
Chaos Code: New Sign of Catastrophe	F K Digital	Arc System Works	March 26, 2020	
Chaos;Head Noah / Chaos;Child Double Pack	Mages	Mages	February 24, 2022	
Chapeau	Salt Castle Studio	Salt Castle Studio	March 31, 2020	
Charade Maniacs	Idea Factory	Idea Factory	September 16, 2021	
The Charming Empire	OperaHouse Corporation	D3 Publisher	March 29, 2018	
Chasing Static	Headware Games	Ratalaika Games	January 12, 2023	
Checkers	Sabec	Sabec	July 23, 2020	
Chess Ace	Mythic Owl	Cool Small Games	July 23, 2020	
Chess Ultra	Ripstone	Ripstone	November 2, 2017	
Chicken Assassin: Reloaded	OneShark	Akupara Games	July 19, 2018	
Chicken Police: Paint it Red!	The Wild Gentlemen	HandyGames	November 5, 2020	
Chicken Range	Funbox Media	Funbox Media	October 25, 2018	
Chicken Rider	Ultimate Games	Ultimate Games	June 24, 2019	
Chicory: A Colorful Tale	Greg Lobanov	Finji	December 15, 2021	
Chiki-Chiki Boxy Racers	Pocket	Pocket	January 25, 2018	
Chiki-Chiki Boxy Pro Wrestling	Pocket	Pocket	June 27, 2019	
Child of Light	Ubisoft Montreal	Ubisoft	October 11, 2018	
The Child's Sight	Forever Entertainment	Forever Entertainment	June 20, 2019	
Children of Morta	Dead Mage	JP: DMM Games; WW: Dead Mage	November 20, 2019	
Children of Zodiarcs	Plug In Digital	JP: Circle Entertainment; WW: Plug In Digital	March 27, 2020	
Chime Sharp	Chilled Mouse	Chilled Mouse	May 28, 2019	
Chinatown Detective Agency	General Interactive	General Interactive, Whisper Games	April 8, 2022	
Chinese Parents	Coconut Island	Playism	August 20, 2020	
Chocobo GP	Square Enix	Square Enix	March 10, 2022	
Chocobo's Mystery Dungeon Every Buddy!	Square Enix	Square Enix	March 20, 2019	
Choju Giga Wars	Silver Star Japan	Silver Star Japan	March 1, 2018	
Choo-Choo Charles	Two Star Games	Two Star Games	January 18, 2024	
Chou no Doku Hana no Kusari: Taishou Tsuya Koi Ibun	Aromarie	Prototype	February 20, 2020	
Chou Tousouchuu & Chou Sentouchuu Double Pack	Namco Bandai	Namco Bandai	November 29, 2018	
Christmas Tina	Coconut Island Games	Coconut Island Games	July 29, 2021	
ChromaGun	Pixel Maniacs	Pixel Maniacs	January 22, 2018	
Chroma Squad	Behold Studios	Bandai Namco Entertainment	August 1, 2019	
Chrono Clash: Fantasy Tactics	Tyler Projects	Tyler Projects	January 28, 2019	
Chronos: Before the Ashes	Gunfire Games	THQ Nordic	December 1, 2020	
Chronus Arc	Hit Point	Kemco	December 20, 2018	
Chuka Taisen	Taito	Joyful Table	September 6, 2018	
The Church in the Darkness	Paranoid Productions	Fellow Traveller Games	August 2, 2019	
Ciel Fledge: A Daughter Raising Simulator	Studio Namaapa	PQube	February 21, 2020	
Ciel Nosurge DX	Gust Co. Ltd.	Koei Tecmo	March 4, 2021	
Cinders	MoaCube, Crunching Koalas	Crunching Koalas	February 14, 2019	
Circle of Football	Yonder	Fantastico Studio	TBA	
Circle of Sumo	Yonder	Strelka Games	November 16, 2018	
Circle of Sumo: Online Rumble!	Yonder, Strelka Games	Strelka Games	October 17, 2020	
Circuit Dude	Crait	Crait	September 7, 2020	
Circuit Superstars	Original Fire Games	Square Enix	June 21, 2023	
Circuits	Digital Tentacle	Hidden Trap	April 5, 2019	
Cities: Skylines	Colossal Order	Paradox Interactive	September 13, 2018	
Citizen Sleeper	Jump Over the Age	Fellow Traveller	May 5, 2022	
Citizen Sleeper 2: Starward Vector	Jump Over the Age	Fellow Traveller	January 31, 2025	
Citizens of Space	Eden Industries	Sega	June 18, 2019	
Citizens Unite!: Earth x Space	Eden Industries	Kemco	January 28, 2021	
City Bus Driving Simulator	BoomBit Games	BoomBit Games	August 13, 2020	
City of Brass	Uppercut Games	Uppercut Fames	February 8, 2019	
Civilization VI	Firaxis Games	2K	November 16, 2018	
Civilization VII	Firaxis Games	2K	February 11, 2025	
Clan N	Creamative	Creamative	August 6, 2020	
Clannad	Key	Prototype	July 4, 2019	
Clash of Elementalists Burst	Amuzy	Amuzy	April 23, 2020	
Clash Force	Spicy Gyro Games	Ratalaika Games	July 3, 2020	
Class of Heroes Anniversary Edition	Acquire	Acquire	April 26, 2018	
Classic Games Collection Vol.1	Baltoro Games	Baltoro Games	July 26, 2019	
Classic Pool	Revulo Games	Revulo Games	July 10, 2021	
Claws of Furry	Terahard	Terahard	August 9, 2018	
Claybook	Second Order	Second Order	March 12, 2019	
Clea	Invert Mouse	Sekai Games	October 30, 2020	
Clive 'N' Wrench	Dinosaur Bytes	Numskull Games	February 24, 2023	
Clocker	Wild Kid Games	Gamera Game	February 25, 2021	
Clockwork Aquario	Westone Bit Entertainment	Inin Games	November 30, 2021	
Clock Zero: Shuuen no Ichibyou − Devote	Otomate	Idea Factory	June 20, 2019	
Clone Drone in the Danger Zone	Doborog Games	Doborog Games	July 27, 2021	
Close to the Sun	Storm in a Teacup	Wired Productions	October 29, 2019	
Cloudpunk	Ion Lands	Merge Games	October 15, 2020	
Clouds & Sheep 2	HandyGames	HandyGames	December 21, 2018	
Closed Nightmare	Nippon Ichi Software	Nippon Ichi Software	July 19, 2018	
Clubhouse Games: 51 Worldwide Classics	NDcube	Nintendo	June 5, 2020	
Clue: The Classic Mystery Game	Hasbro	Hasbro	November 30, 2018	
Clumsy Rush	Red Deer Games	Red Deer Games	December 23, 2019	
ClusterPuck99	PHL Collective	Coatsink	March 29, 2018	
Clustertruck	Landfall Games	TinyBuild	March 15, 2018	
Cobalt Core	Rocket Rat Games	Brace Yourself Games	November 8, 2023	
Cobra Kai: The Karate Kid Saga Continues	Flux Game Studio	GameMill Entertainment	October 27, 2020	
CoComelon: Play with JJ	SockMonkey Studios	Outright Games	October 28, 2022	
Code of Princess EX	Studio Saizensen	Nicalis	July 31, 2018	
Code Shifter	Arc System Works	Arc System Works	January 30, 2020	
Code: Realize − Bouquet of Rainbows	Design Factory	Idea Factory	September 13, 2018	
Code: Realize − Future Blessings	Idea Factory	JP: Idea Factory; WW: Aksys Games	September 13, 2018	
Code: Realize − Guardian of Rebirth	Idea Factory	JP: Idea Factory; WW: Aksys Games	September 13, 2018	
Code: Realize − Wintertide Miracles	Idea Factory	JP: Idea Factory; WW: Aksys Games	July 16, 2020	
Codebreaker Puzzle 1000!: ENG & JAN	Success	Success	February 25, 2021	
Coffee Talk	Toge Productions	Chorus Worldwide	January 29, 2020	
Coffee Talk Episode 2: Hibiscus & Butterfly	Toge Productions	Chorus Worldwide	April 20, 2023	
Coffin Dodgers	Milky Tea Studio	Wales Interactive	March 13, 2018	
Cogen: Sword of Rewind	Gemdrops	Gemdrops	January 27, 2022	
Collapsed	Glaive Games	OverGamez	August 29, 2020	
Collar × Malice	Idea Factory	JP: Idea Factory; WW: Aksys Games	March 12, 2020	
Collar × Malice: Unlimited	Idea Factory	Aksys Games	August 13, 2020	
Collidalot	Grunka Munka Games	Grunka Munka	November 9, 2018	
Collide-a-Ball 2	Sims	Starsign	July 25, 2019	
Collection of Mana	Square Enix	Square Enix	June 1, 2017	
Collection of Saga Final Fantasy Legend	Square Enix	Square Enix	December 15, 2020	
Colloc	Pazolab Studio	NoobO Games	July 25, 2020	
Color Jumper	Tallbeard Studios	Noble Robot	August 28, 2020	
Colors Live	Collecting Smiles	Collecting Smiles	September 14, 2021	
Colossal Cave	Cygnus Entertainment	Cygnus Entertainment	January 19, 2023	
The Coma: Recut	Devespresso Studios, Stage Clear Studios	JP: Chorus Worldwide; WW: Digerati	December 21, 2017	
The Coma 2: Vicious Sisters	Devespresso Studios, Stage Clear Studios	JP: Chorus Worldwide; WW: Digerati	June 19, 2020	
Comic Coloring Book	Red Deer Games	Red Deer Games	December 28, 2020	
Commander '85	Moonwalls	Ultimate Games	TBA	
Commander Keen in Keen Dreams	id Software	Lone Wolf Technology	February 7, 2019	
Commandos 2 - HD Remaster	Yippee Entertainment	Kalypso Media	December 4, 2020	
Commandos 3 - HD Remaster	Raylight Games	Kalypso Media	August 30, 2022	
The Complex	Wales Interactive	Wales Interactive	March 31, 2020	
Concept Destruction	Thinice Games	Ratalaika Games	May 22, 2020	
Conduct Together!	Northplay	Northplay	December 6, 2018	
Conan Chop Chop	Mighty Kingdom	Funcom	March 1, 2022	
Conglomerate 451: Overloaded	RuneHeads	34BigThings	June 3, 2021	
ConnecTank	Yummy Yummy Tummy	Inin Games	September 28, 2021	
/Connection Haunted <SERVER ERROR>	No Gravity Games	No Gravity Games	September 3, 2020	
Construction Simulator 2 US	Weltenbauer	Astragon Entertainment	November 6, 2019	
Construction Simulator 3	Weltenbauer	Astragon Entertainment	October 21, 2020	
Constructor Plus	System 3	System 3	February 28, 2019	
Content Warning	Wilnyl, Philip, thePetHen, Skog, Zorro	Landfall	April 1, 2026	
Contra Anniversary Collection	Konami	Konami	June 11, 2019	
Contra: Rogue Corps	Konami	Konami	September 24, 2019	
Control: Ultimate Edition Cloud Version	Remedy Entertainment	505 Games	October 28, 2020	
Convergence: A League of Legends Story	Double Stallion	Riot Forge	May 23, 2023	
Conway: Disappearance at Dahlia View	White Paper Games	Sold Out	November 2, 2021	
Cook, Serve, Delicious! 2	Vertigo Gaming	Vertigo Gaming	April 10, 2019	
Cook, Serve, Delicious! 3	Vertigo Gaming	Vertigo Gaming	October 14, 2020	
Cookie Cutter: Overkill Edition	Subcult Joint	Rogue Games	March 27, 2025	
Cooking Mama: Cookstar	First Playable Productions	Planet Entertainment	March 31, 2020	
Cooking Simulator	Forever Entertainment	Forever Entertainment	May 14, 2020	
Corpse Party	Team GrisGris, Mages	JP: Mages; WW: Xseed Games	February 18, 2021	
Corpse Party: Blood Drive	Team GrisGris, 5pb.	JP: Mages; NA: Marvelous USA; EU: Marvelous Europe	October 10, 2019	
Cosmonauta	QUByte Interactive	QUByte Interactive	February 11, 2020	
Cosmic	King's Pleasure	Feardemic	TBA	
Cosmic Defenders	Fiery Squirrel	Natsume Inc.	June 11, 2020	
Cosmic Star Heroine	Zeboyd Games	Limited Run Games	August 14, 2018	
Cotton 100%	Success	JP: Sunsoft; WW: ININ Games	October 29, 2021	
Cotton Reboot!	Sangatu Usagi no Mori	JP: Beep; WW: Inin Games	February 25, 2021	
Cotton Rock 'n' Roll	Success	Success	December 23, 2021	
CounterAttack: Uprising	Relative Games	Relative Software LTD.	September 28, 2023	
Cozy Grove	Spry Fox	The Quantum Astrophysicists Guild	April 8, 2021	
Crash Bandicoot 4: It's About Time	Vicarious Visions	JP: Sega; WW: Activision	March 12, 2021	
Crash Bandicoot N. Sane Trilogy	Vicarious Visions	JP: Sega; WW: Activision	June 29, 2018	
Crash Drive 3	M2H	M2H	July 8, 2021	
Crash Team Racing Nitro-Fueled	Beenox	JP: Sega; WW: Activision	June 21, 2019	
Crashlands	Butterscotch Shenanigans	Butterscotch Shenanigans	November 8, 2018	
Crawl	Powerhoof	Powerhoof	December 19, 2017	
Crawlco Block Knockers	EastAsiaSoft	EastAsiaSoft	December 17, 2020	
Crayola Scoot	Climax Studios	Outright Games	October 16, 2018	
Crayon Shin-chan: Ora to Hakase no Natsuyasumi – Owaranai Nanokakan no Tabi	Millennium Kitchen	Neos	July 15, 2021	
Crayon Shin-chan: The Storm Called! Flaming Kasukabe Runner	Bushiroad	Bushiroad	January 14, 2020	
Crazy Chicken Xtreme	Korion Interactive	TREVA	February 8, 2018	
Creaks	Amanita Design	JP: Playism; WW: Amanita Design	July 22, 2020	
Creature in the Well	Flight School	Flight School	September 6, 2019	
Cresteaju	PLiCy, Shou	PLiCy	September 17, 2020	
Cricket 19	Big Ant Studios	Big Ant Studios	May 28, 2019	
Cricket 22	Big Ant Studios	Nacon	April 28, 2022	
Cricket Through the Ages	Free Lives	Devolver Digital	March 1, 2024	
Crime O'Clock	Bad Seed	Just For Games	June 30, 2023	
Crimzon Clover: World Explosion	Yotsubane	Degica	October 29, 2020	
Cris Tales	Dreams Uncorporated, Syck	Modus Games	July 20, 2021	
Crisis Core: Final Fantasy VII Reunion	Tose	Square Enix	December 13, 2022	
Critadel	Pixelian Studio	Nicalis	October 13, 2021	
Croc 2: Kingdom of the Gobbos	Argonaut Games	Argonaut Games	October 29, 2026	
Cross Channel: For All People	Regista, FlyingShine	Regista	August 20, 2020	
CrossCode	Radical Fish Games	Deck13	July 9, 2020	
Crossing Souls	Fourattic	Devolver Digital	July 26, 2018	
Crown Trick	Next Studios	Team17	October 16, 2020	
The Cruel King and the Great Hero	Nippon Ichi Software	JP: Nippon Ichi Software; WW: NIS America	June 24, 2021	
Cruis'n Blast	Raw Thrills	GameMill Entertainment	September 14, 2021	
Cry Babies Magic Tears: The Big Game	Drakhar Studio	Merge Games	September 22, 2023	
Crypt of the NecroDancer	Brace Yourself Games	Brace Yourself Games	February 1, 2018	
Crysis Remastered	Saber Interactive	Crytek	July 23, 2020	
Crysis 2 Remastered	Crytek	Crytek	October 15, 2021	
Crysis 3 Remastered	Crytek	Crytek	October 15, 2021	
Crystal Crisis	Nicalis	JP: Pikii; WW: Nicalis	May 28, 2019	
Crystar	Gemdrops	JP: FuRyu; WW: NIS America	February 24, 2022	
Cube Creator X	Arc System Works	Arc System Works	April 26, 2018	
Cube Life: Island Survival HD	Cypronia	Cypronia	December 26, 2020	
Cult of the Lamb	Massive Monster	Devolver Digital	August 11, 2022	
Cultic	Jasozz Games	3D Realms	TBA	
Cultist Simulator	Weather Factory	Playdigious	February 2, 2021	
Cuphead	StudioMDHR	StudioMDHR	April 18, 2019	
Cupid Parasite	Idea Factory	Idea Factory	August 20, 2020	
Cupid Parasite: Sweet & Spicy Darling	Idea Factory	Idea Factory	November 30, 2023	
Curious Expedition	Maschinen-Mensch	Thunderful Publishing	April 2, 2020	
Curse Crackers: For Whom the Belle Toils	Colorgrave	Colorgrave	August 24, 2023	
Curse of the Dead Gods	Passtech Games	Focus Home Interactive	February 23, 2021	
Curse of the Sea Rats	Petoons Studio	pQube	April 6, 2023	
Cursed Castilla	Locomalito, Gryzor87	Abylight Studios	January 24, 2019	
Cyanide & Happiness: Freakpocalypse	Skeleton Crew Studios, Explosm Games	Serenity Forge	March 11, 2021	
Cyber Citizen Shockman	Shinyuden	Ratalaika Games	May 18, 2023	
Cyber Citizen Shockman 3: The Princess from Another World	Shinyuden	Ratalaika Games	May 3, 2024	
Cyber Shadow	Mechanical Head Studios	JP: Inti Creates; WW: Yacht Club Games	January 26, 2021	
Cytus Alpha	Rayark	Flyhigh Works	April 25, 2019	
D/Generation HD	West Coast Software	West Coast Software	March 27, 2018	
Daemon X Machina	Marvelous First Studio	Nintendo	September 13, 2019	
Dairoku: Agents of Sakuratani	Idea Factory	JP: Idea Factory; WW: Aksys Games	May 28, 2020	
Daitoshokan no Hitsujikai: Library Party	Aria	Aria	July 26, 2018	
Damascus Gear: Operation Tokyo	A+ Games, Arc System Works	Arc System Works	March 1, 2018	
Dandara	Long Hat House	Raw Fury	February 6, 2018	
Dandy Ace	Mad Mimic	Neowiz	September 28, 2021	
Dandy Dungeon: Legend of Brave Yamada	Onion Games	Onion Games	June 27, 2019	
Danganronpa: Trigger Happy Havoc	Spike Chunsoft	Spike Chunsoft	November 4, 2021	
Danganronpa 2: Goodbye Despair	Spike Chunsoft	Spike Chunsoft	November 4, 2021	
Danganronpa S: Ultimate Summer Camp	Spike Chunsoft	Spike Chunsoft	November 4, 2021	
Danganronpa V3: Killing Harmony	Spike Chunsoft	Spike Chunsoft	November 4, 2021	
Danger Mouse: The Danger Games	9th Impact Studios	9th Impact Studios	September 13, 2018	
Danmaku Unlimited 3	Doragon Entertainment	Doragon Entertainment	March 13, 2018	
Dariusburst Another Chronicle EX+	Taito	JP: Taito; WW: Inin Games	February 25, 2021	
Darius Cozmic Collection Arcade	M2	JP: Taito; WW: Inin Games	February 28, 2019	
Darius Cozmic Collection Console	M2	JP: Taito; WW: Inin Games	February 28, 2019	
Darius Cozmic Revelation	M2	JP: Taito; WW: Inin Games	February 25, 2021	
The Dark Crystal: Age of Resistance Tactics	BonusXP, En Masse Entertainment	Netflix	February 4, 2020	
Dark Deity	Sword & Axe	indie.io	March 17, 2022	
Dark Devotion	Hibernian Workshop	The Arcade Crew	October 24, 2019	
A Dark Room	Scratchwork Development	Circle Entertainment	April 11, 2019	
Dark Souls: Remastered	FromSoftware, Virtuos	Bandai Namco Entertainment	October 19, 2018	
Dark Witch Music Episode: Rudymical	Inside System, Esquadra	Flyhigh Works	May 11, 2017	
Darkest Dungeon	Red Hook Studios	Red Hook Studios	January 18, 2018	
Darkestville Castle	Epic Llama	Buka Entertainment	August 13, 2020	
The Darkside Detective	Spooky Doorway	Spooky Doorway	February 7, 2018	
Darksiders II: Deathinitive Edition	Gunfire Games	THQ Nordic	September 26, 2019	
Darksiders III	Gunfire Games	THQ Nordic	September 30, 2021	
Darksiders Genesis	Airship Syndicate	THQ Nordic	February 14, 2020	
Darksiders: Warmastered Edition	Kaiko	THQ Nordic	April 2, 2019	
Darkwood	Acid Wizard Studio	Crunching Koalas	May 16, 2019	
Darq: Complete Edition	Unfold Games	Feardemic	March 18, 2021	
Date Night Bowling	Way Down Deep	Serenity Forge	November 26, 2021	
Dauntless	Phoenix Labs	Phoenix Labs	December 10, 2019	
Dave the Diver	Mintrocket	Mintrocket	October 26, 2023	
Dawn of the Breakers	CyberStep	CyberStep	July 5, 2018	
Dawn of the Monsters	13AM Games	WayForward	March 15, 2022	
DC League of Super-Pets: The Adventures of Krypto and Ace	PHL Collective	Outright Games	July 15, 2022	
DC Super Hero Girls: Teen Power	Toybox	Nintendo	June 4, 2021	
DC Universe Online	Daybreak Game Company	Daybreak Game Company	August 6, 2019	
De Blob	BlitWorks	THQ Nordic	June 26, 2018	
De Blob 2	BlitWorks	THQ Nordic	August 28, 2018	
De Mambo	The Dangerous Kitchen	JP: Chorus Worldwide; WW: The Dangerous Kitchen	June 29, 2017	
Dead Cells	Motion Twin	Motion Twin	August 7, 2018	
Dead by Daylight	Behaviour Interactive	Starbreeze Studios	September 24, 2019	
Dead in Vinland	CCCP	Plug In Digital	July 11, 2019	
Dead or Alive Xtreme 3: Scarlet	Team Ninja	Koei Tecmo	March 20, 2019	
Dead or School	Studio Nanafushi	JP: Studio Nanafushi; WW: Marvelous Europe	August 29, 2019	
Dead Synchronicity: Tomorrow Comes Today	Fictiorama Studios	BadLand Games	November 21, 2017	
Deadcraft	Marvelous First Studio	JP: Marvelous; WW: Xseed Games	May 19, 2022	
Deadly Premonition: Origins	Access Games	Access Games	September 4, 2019	
Deadly Premonition 2: A Blessing in Disguise	Access Games	Access Games	July 10, 2020	
Dear me, I was...	Arc System Works	Arc System Works	February 12, 2026	
Death Come True	Too Kyo Games	IzanagiGames	June 24, 2020	
Death end re;Quest	Compile Heart	JP: Compile Heart; WW: Idea Factory International	December 24, 2020	
Death end re;Quest 2	Compile Heart	JP: Compile Heart; WW: Idea Factory International	August 19, 2021	
Death Match Love Comedy	Kemco	Kemco	June 25, 2020	
Death of a Wish	Melessthanthree	Syndicate Atomic	March 11, 2024	
Death Road to Canada	Rocketcat Games	Ukiyo Publishing	May 8, 2018	
Death Squared	SMG Studio	JP: Circle Entertainment; WW: SMG Studio	July 13, 2017	
Death's Door	Acid Nerve	Devolver Digital	November 23, 2021	
Death's Gambit: Afterlife	White Rabbit	Serenity Forge	September 30, 2021	
Deemo	Rayark, Esquadra	Flyhigh Works	September 20, 2017	
Deemo: Reborn	Rayark	Rayark	December 17, 2020	
Deep Sky Derelicts: Definitive Edition	Snowhound Games	1C Company	March 24, 2020	
Deer Drive Legends	Raylight	Maximum Games	June 14, 2019	
Defend Your Castle	XGen Studios	XGen Studios	April 25, 2019	
Defense Grid 2	Hidden Path Entertainment	Hidden Path Entertainment	February 7, 2019	
Defunct	Soedesco	Soedesco	September 13, 2018	
Dei Gratia no Rashinban	Catalyst	Regista	December 27, 2018	
Deliver Us the Moon	KeokeN Interactive	Wired Productions	July 16, 2024	
Deltarune	8-4	8-4	February 28, 2019	
Dementium: The Ward	atooi	atooi	October 12, 2023	
Demetrios: The Big Cynical Adventure	Cowcat	Cowcat	December 3, 2018	
The Demon Crystal	Regista	Regista	December 20, 2018	
Demon Gaze Extra	Cattle Call	JP: Kadokawa Games; WW: Clouded Leopard Entertainment	September 2, 2021	
Demon Slayer: Kimetsu no Yaiba – The Hinokami Chronicles	CyberConnect2	JP: Aniplex; WW: Sega	June 9, 2022	
Demon Throttle	Doinksoft	Devolver Digital	November 4, 2022	
Demon Tides	Fabraz	Fangamer	TBA	
Demon Turf	Fabraz	Playtonic Friends	November 4, 2021	
Demon's Tilt	Flarb, Wiznwar	Flarb	December 23, 2019	
Demons Ate My Neighbors!	Tuned-Out Games	Tuned-Out Games	TBA	
Densha de Go! Hashirou Yamanote Sen	Square Enix, Taito	Square Enix, Taito	March 18, 2021	
Deponia	Daedalic Entertainment	Daedalic Entertainment	April 24, 2019	
Deponia Doomsday	Daedalic Entertainment	Daedalic Entertainment	December 23, 2019	
Derby Stallion	Land Ho!	Game Addict	December 3, 2020	
Deru: The Art of Cooperation	Ink Kit	Mr. Whale's Game Service	November 7, 2018	
Descenders	RageSquid	No More Robots	November 5, 2020	
Desire: Remaster Version	Red Flag Ship	Red Flag Ship	December 27, 2019	
Despera Drops	Red Entertainment	Aksys Games	November 30, 2023	
Despelote	Julián Cordero, Sebastián Valbuena	Panic	May 1, 2025	
Desta: The Memories Between	Ustwo	Ustwo	April 26, 2023	
Destiny Connect: Tick-Tock Travelers	Nippon Ichi Software	JP: Nippon Ichi Software; WW: NIS America	February 28, 2019	
Destroy All Humans!	Black Forest Games	THQ Nordic	June 29, 2021	
Detective Instinct: Farewell, My Beloved	Armonica LLC	Armonica LLC	November 26, 2025	
Detective Pikachu Returns	Creatures	The Pokémon Company, Nintendo	October 6, 2023	
Detention	Red Candle Games	Red Candle Games	March 1, 2018	
Devil May Cry	Capcom	Capcom	June 24, 2019	
Devil May Cry 2	Capcom	Capcom	September 19, 2019	
Devil May Cry 3	Capcom	Capcom	February 20, 2020	
Devil Slayer Raksasi	Masatoko Games	Masatoko Games	April 22, 2021	
Dex	Dreadlocks Ltd	QubicGames	July 24, 2020	
Diablo II: Resurrected	Vicarious Visions	Blizzard Entertainment	September 23, 2021	
Diablo III: Eternal Collection	Blizzard Entertainment	Blizzard Entertainment	November 2, 2018	
Diabolik Lovers: Chaos Lineage	Rejet	Idea Factory	March 28, 2019	
Dice Legacy	DESTINYbit	Ravenscourt, Maple Whispering Limited	September 9, 2021	
Dicey Dungeons	Terry Cavanagh	Terry Cavanagh	December 15, 2020	
Dies irae: Amantes amentes	Greenwood	Views	October 18, 2018	
Dig-Rock: Documentary of Youthful Sounds	Altergear	Idea Factory	August 28, 2025	
Digimon Story: Cyber Sleuth	Media.Vision	Bandai Namco Entertainment	October 17, 2019	
Digimon Story: Cyber Sleuth - Hacker's Memory	Media.Vision	Bandai Namco Entertainment	October 17, 2019	
Digimon Story: Time Stranger	Media.Vision	Bandai Namco Entertainment	July 10, 2026	
Digimon Survive	Hyde	Bandai Namco Entertainment	July 29, 2022	
Digimon World: Next Order	B.B. Studio	Bandai Namco Entertainment	February 22, 2023	
Dimension Drive	2Awesome Studio	2Awesome Studio	December 7, 2017	
Dinkum	James Bendon	Krafton	November 6, 2025	
Disaster Report 4 Plus: Summer Memories	Granzella	JP: Granzella; WW: NIS America	September 26, 2019	
Disc Jam	High Horse Entertainment	High Horse Entertainment	February 8, 2018	
Disc Room	Terri, Dose, Kitty, and JW	Devolver Digital	October 22, 2020	
Disco Elysium	ZA/UM	ZA/UM	October 12, 2021	
Disease: Hidden Object	OperaHouse Corporation	D3 Publisher	July 5, 2018	
Disgaea 1 Complete	Nippon Ichi Software	Nippon Ichi Software	July 26, 2018	
Disgaea 4 Complete+	Nippon Ichi Software	Nippon Ichi Software	October 29, 2019	
Disgaea 5 Complete	Nippon Ichi Software	Nippon Ichi Software	March 3, 2017	
Disgaea 6: Defiance of Destiny	Nippon Ichi Software	Nippon Ichi Software	January 28, 2021	
Disgaea 7: Vows of the Virtueless	Nippon Ichi Software	Nippon Ichi Software	January 26, 2023	
The Disney Afternoon Collection	Digital Eclipse	Atari	February 26, 2026	
Disney Classic Games: Aladdin and The Lion King	Digital Eclipse	Disney Interactive	October 29, 2019	
Disney Dreamlight Valley	Gameloft Montreal	Gameloft	December 5, 2023	
Disney Illusion Island	Dlala Studios	Disney Interactive	July 28, 2023	
Disney Magical World 2: Enchanted Edition	Bandai Namco Studios, Hyde	Bandai Namco Entertainment	December 2, 2021	
Disney Speedstorm	Gameloft	Gameloft	September 28, 2023	
Disney Tsum Tsum Festival	B.B. Studio, Hyde	Bandai Namco Entertainment	October 10, 2019	
Disney Villains Cursed Cafe	Bloom Digital Media	Disney Games	March 27, 2025	
Dispatch	AdHoc Studio	AdHoc Studio	January 28, 2026	
Distrust	Cheerdealers	Alawar	July 16, 2019	
Divinity: Original Sin II	Larian Studios	Bandai Namco Entertainment	September 4, 2019	
Doctor Who: The Edge of Reality	Maze Theory	BBC Studios, Just Add Water	October 28, 2021	
Doctor Who: The Lonely Assassins	Maze Theory	Maze Theory	August 12, 2021	
Dodgeball Academia	Pocket Trap	Humble Games	August 5, 2021	
DoDonPachi Resurrection	Cave	Live Wire	November 25, 2021	
Dog Duty	Zanardi and Liza	Soedesco	September 17, 2020	
Dojoran	Nautlander Studio	Ratalaika Games	September 17, 2021	
Dokapon Up! Mugen no Roulette	Sting Entertainment	Aquaplus	December 10, 2020	
Doki Doki Literature Club Plus!	Team Salvato	JP: Playism; WW: Serenity Forge	June 30, 2021	
Dollhouse	Creazn Studio	Soedesco	October 29, 2021	
Don Swagger	Hearts Technology	Hearts Technology	TBA	
Don't Die, Mr. Robot! DX	Infinite State Games	Digerati	May 3, 2018	
Don't Knock Twice	Wales Interactive	Wales Interactive	October 17, 2017	
Don't Starve	Klei Entertainment	505 Games	April 12, 2018	
Don't Starve Together	Klei Entertainment	Klei Entertainment	April 12, 2022	
Donkey Kong Country: Tropical Freeze	Retro Studios	Nintendo	May 3, 2018	
Donkey Kong Country Returns HD	Retro Studios	Nintendo	January 16, 2025	
Donut County	Ben Esposito	Annapurna Interactive	December 18, 2018	
Doom (1993)	id Software	Bethesda Softworks	July 26, 2019	
Doom (2016)	id Software, Panic Button	Bethesda Softworks	November 10, 2017	
Doom II	id Software	Bethesda Softworks	July 26, 2019	
Doom 3: BFG Edition	id Software	Bethesda Softworks	July 26, 2019	
Doom 64	id Software	Bethesda Softworks	March 20, 2020	
Doom Eternal	id Software, Panic Button	Bethesda Softworks	December 8, 2020	
Door Kickers	Killhouse Games	QubicGames	December 26, 2020	
Door Kickers: Action Squad	Killhouse Games	Killhouse Games	October 28, 2019	
Doors of Insanity	OneShark	Another Indie	TBA	
Doraemon Story of Seasons	Brownies, Marvelous	Bandai Namco Entertainment	June 13, 2019	
Doraemon Story of Seasons: Friends of the Great Kingdom	Marvelous	Bandai Namco Entertainment	November 2, 2022	
Dordogne	Un Je Ne Sais Quoi, Umanimation	Focus Entertainment	June 13, 2023	
Double Cross	13AM Games	13AM Games	January 10, 2019	
Double Dragon IV	Arc System Works	Arc System Works	September 7, 2017	
Double Dragon Gaiden: Rise of the Dragons	Secret Base	Modus Games	July 27, 2023	
Double Dragon Neon	WayForward	JP: Arc System Works; WW: Majesco	December 21, 2020	
Double Kick Heroes	Headbang Club	Headbang Club	August 13, 2020	
Doukoku Soshite	El Dia	El Dia	November 7, 2019	
Downwell	Moppin	Devolver Digital	January 31, 2019	
Dr Kawashima's Brain Training for Nintendo Switch	Nintendo EPD, indieszero	Nintendo	December 27, 2019	
Dr. Mikio Hiraiwa-Supervised Yomu Tore Go	Something Good Corporation	Something Good Corporation	July 11, 2020	
Dragon Ball FighterZ	Arc System Works	Bandai Namco Entertainment	September 27, 2018	
Dragon Ball: Sparking! Zero	Spike Chunsoft	Bandai Namco Entertainment	November 14, 2025	
Dragon Ball: The Breakers	Dimps	Bandai Namco Entertainment	October 14, 2022	
Dragon Ball Xenoverse 2	Dimps	Bandai Namco Entertainment	September 7, 2017	
Dragon Ball Z: Kakarot	CyberConnect2	Bandai Namco Entertainment	September 22, 2021	
Dragon Ball Z: Super Butoden	Arc System Works	Bandai Namco Entertainment	September 27, 2018	
Dragon Blaze	Psikyo	Zerodiv	April 5, 2018	
Dragon Marked for Death	Inti Creates	Inti Creates	January 31, 2019	
Dragon Quest	Square Enix	Square Enix	September 27, 2019	
Dragon Quest II	Square Enix	Square Enix	September 27, 2019	
Dragon Quest I & II HD-2D Remake	Square Enix	Square Enix	October 30, 2025	
Dragon Quest III	Square Enix	Square Enix	September 27, 2019	
Dragon Quest III HD-2D Remake	Team Asano, Amata K.K.	Square Enix	November 14, 2024	
Dragon Quest X	Square Enix	Square Enix	September 21, 2017	
Dragon Quest X Offline	Square Enix	Square Enix	November 17, 2023	
Dragon Quest XI	Square Enix	JP: Square Enix; WW: Nintendo	September 27, 2019	
Dragon Quest Builders	Square Enix	JP: Square Enix; WW: Nintendo	February 9, 2018	
Dragon Quest Builders 2	Square Enix, Omega Force	JP: Square Enix; WW: Nintendo	December 20, 2018	
Dragon Quest HD-2D Remake	Team Asano, Amata K.K.	Square Enix	October 30, 2025	
Dragon Quest Heroes: The World Tree's Woe and the Blight Below	Omega Force	Square Enix	March 3, 2017	
Dragon Quest Heroes II	Omega Force	Square Enix	March 3, 2017	
Dragon Quest Monsters: Terry's Wonderland Retro	Square Enix	Square Enix	September 17, 2019	
Dragon Quest Monsters: The Dark Prince	Square Enix	Square Enix	December 1, 2023	
Dragon Quest Rivals Ace	Square Enix	Square Enix	August 13, 2020	
Dragon Quest Treasures	Tose	Square Enix	December 9, 2022	
Dragon Saikyou Ou Zukan: Battle Colosseum	Nippon Columbia	Nippon Columbia	July 4, 2024	
Dragon Sinker	Exe Create	Kemco	February 22, 2018	
Dragon Star Varnir	Compile Heart	Idea Factory	May 27, 2021	
Dragon's Dogma: Dark Arisen	Capcom	Capcom	April 23, 2019	
Dragon's Lair Trilogy	Digital Leisure	Digital Leisure	January 17, 2019	
Drawful 2	Jackbox Games	Jackbox Games	June 21, 2018	
Drawn to Life: Two Realms	Digital Continue	505 Games	December 7, 2020	
DreadOut 2	Digital Happiness	Digital Happiness	January 18, 2024	
Dream Daddy: A Dad Dating Simulator	Game Grumps	Game Grumps	July 2, 2019	
DreamWorks Dragons Dawn of New Riders	Climax Studios	Outright Games	February 1, 2019	
Dredge	Black Salt Games	Team17	March 30, 2023	
#Drive	Pixel Perfect Dude	PM Studios	February 16, 2021	
Dual Gear	Orbital Speed Studio	Corecell Technology	TBA	
Duck Game	Landon Podbielski	Adult Swim Games	May 2, 2019	
Dude, Stop	Team Halfbeard	Team Halfbeard	June 1, 2018	
A Duel Hand Disaster: Trackher	Ask An Enemy Studios	Ask An Enemy Studios	June 10, 2019	
Duel Masters de Asobo	Takara Tomy	Takara Tomy	August 5, 2021	
Duke Nukem 3D: 20th Anniversary World Tour	Gearbox Software	Gearbox Publishing	June 23, 2020	
DuneCrawl	Alientrap	Alientrap	2026	
Dungeon Defenders: Awakened	Chromatic Games	Chromatic Games	August 4, 2021	
Dungeon Encounters	Cattle Call	Square Enix	October 14, 2021	
Dungeon Munchies	maJAJa	maJAJa, Chorus Worldwide	December 15, 2021	
Dungeon of the Endless	Amplitude Studios	Playdigious	May 15, 2020	
Dungeon Village	Kairosoft	Kairosoft	October 11, 2018	
Dungeons of Dreadrock	Christoph Minnameier	Christoph Minnameier	January 31, 2022	
Dungreed	Team Horay	Pikii	September 24, 2020	
Dusk	David Szymanski	New Blood Interactive	October 28, 2021	
Dusk Diver	Jera Game Studio	JP: Justdan; WW: PQube	October 24, 2019	
Dusk Diver 2	Wanin Games	Justdan International	February 24, 2022	
Dust & Neon	David Marquardt Studios	Rogue Games	February 16, 2023	
Dust: An Elysian Tail	Humble Hearts	Limited Run Games	September 10, 2018	
Dying: 1983	Nekcom	2P Games	TBA	
Dying Light: Platinum Edition	Techland	Techland	October 19, 2021	
Dying Light 2 Stay Human	Techland	Techland	February 4, 2022	
Dynamite Fishing: World Games	HandyGames	HandyGames	December 21, 2018	
Dynasty Warriors 8: Empires	Omega Force	Koei Tecmo	November 9, 2017	
Dynasty Warriors 8: Xtreme Legends	Omega Force	Koei Tecmo	December 27, 2018	
Dynasty Warriors 9: Empires	Omega Force	Koei Tecmo	December 23, 2021	
Dyschronia: Chronos Alternate	MyDearest	Izanagi Games	November 21, 2023	
E School Life	Hooksoft	Entergram	July 30, 2020	
EA Sports FC 24	EA Canada	EA Sports	September 29, 2023	
EA Sports FC 25	EA Canada	EA Sports	September 27, 2024	
EA Sports FC 26	EA Canada	EA Sports	September 26, 2025	
Eagle Island	Pixelnicks	Screenwave Media	July 11, 2019	
Earth Atlantis	Pixel Perfex	Headup Games	October 5, 2017	
Earth Defense Force 2017	Sandlot	D3 Publisher	October 14, 2021	
Earth Defense Force 2: Invaders from Planet Space	Sandlot	D3 Publisher	July 15, 2021	
Earth Defense Force 4.1: The Shadow of New Despair	Sandlot	D3 Publisher	December 22, 2022	
Earth Defense Force: World Brothers	Yuke's, Sandlot	D3 Publisher	December 24, 2020	
Earthfall: Alien Horde	Nimble	Nimble	October 29, 2019	
Earthlock	Snowcastle Games	Soedesco	March 8, 2018	
Earthlock 2	Snowcastle Games	Snowcastle Games	TBA	
EarthNight	Cleaversoft	JP: IntraGames; WW: Cleaversoft	December 3, 2019	
Eastward	Pixpil	Chucklefish	September 16, 2021	
Eat Beat Deadspike-san	Arc System Works	Arc System Works	March 21, 2018	
eBaseball Powerful Pro Yakyuu 2020	Konami	Konami	July 9, 2020	
eBaseball Powerful Pro Yakyuu 2022	Konami	Konami	April 21, 2022	
Edge of Eternity	Midgar Studio	Dear Villagers	February 23, 2022	
Egglia Rebirth	Brownies	Brownies	December 16, 2021	
Eiga Sumikko Gurashi Tsugihagi Koujou no Fushigi-na Ko Game de Asobou! Eiga no Sekai	Nippon Columbia	Nippon Columbia	November 16, 2023	
Eiyuden Chronicle: Hundred Heroes	Rabbit & Bear Studios	505 Games	April 23, 2024	
Eiyuden Chronicle: Rising	Rabbit & Bear Studios	505 Games	May 10, 2022	
El Shaddai: Ascension of the Metatron	Crim	Crim	April 28, 2024	
The Elder Scrolls: Blades	Bethesda Game Studios	Bethesda Softworks	May 14, 2020	
The Elder Scrolls V: Skyrim	Bethesda Game Studios	Bethesda Softworks	November 17, 2017	
Eldest Souls	Fallen Flag Studio	United Label	July 29, 2021	
Eliza	Zachtronics	Zachtronics	October 10, 2019	
Elliot Quest	Ansimuz Games	PlayEveryWare	October 19, 2017	
Embracelet	Machineboy	Machineboy	September 24, 2020	
Emio – The Smiling Man: Famicom Detective Club	Nintendo EPD, Mages	Nintendo	August 29, 2024	
Empire of Sin	Romero Games	JP: Sega; WW: Paradox Interactive	December 1, 2020	
Enchanted in the Moonlight: Kiryu, Chikage & Yukinojo	Voltage	Voltage	June 13, 2019	
Enchanted in the Moonlight: Miyabi, Kyoga & Samon	Voltage	Voltage	June 13, 2019	
Enchanting Mahjong Match	D3 Publisher	D3 Publisher	March 14, 2018	
The End Is Nigh	Edmund McMillen	Nicalis	December 12, 2017	
Ender Lilies: Quietus of the Knights	Adglobe, Live Wire	Binary Haze Interactive	June 21, 2021	
Endless Ocean Luminous	Arika	Nintendo	May 2, 2024	
Enter the Gungeon	Dodge Roll	Devolver Digital	December 14, 2017	
Epic Astro Story	Kairosoft	Kairosoft	June 27, 2019	
Epic Mickey: Rebrushed	Purple Lamp	THQ Nordic	September 24, 2024	
Escape from Asura	Mikage	Aksys Games	TBA	
Escape Trick: 35 Fateful Enigmas	Intense	D3 Publisher	February 15, 2018	
The Escapists	Mouldy Toof Studios	Team17	September 25, 2018	
The Escapists 2	Mouldy Toof Studios	Team17	January 11, 2018	
Eschatos	Qute Corporation	Qute Corporation	November 18, 2021	
ESP Ra.De. Psi	Cave	M2	December 19, 2019	
Espgaluda II	Cave	Live Wire	September 9, 2021	
Eternal	Dire Wolf Digital	Dire Wolf Digital	October 8, 2019	
Eternal Radiance	Visualnoveler	Visualnoveler	January 13, 2022	
The Eternal Life of Goldman	Weappy	THQ Nordic	2026	
Eternights	Studio Sai	Studio Sai	October 17, 2024	
Europa	Novadust Entertainment	Future Friends Games	October 11, 2024	
Eve: Burst Error R	C's Ware	Red Flag Ship	October 25, 2018	
Eve: Rebirth Terror	El Dia	Red Flag Ship	February 27, 2020	
Even If Tempest	Voltage	Voltage	June 9, 2022	
Even If Tempest Dawning Connections	Voltage	Voltage	October 26, 2023	
Even the Ocean	Analgesic Productions	Analgesic Productions	August 21, 2020	
Ever Forward	Pathea Games	Pathea Games	December 7, 2021	
Everdream Valley	Mooneaters	Untold Tales	June 23, 2023	
Evergate	Stone Lantern Games	JP: Phoenixx; WW: PQube	August 18, 2020	
EverHood	Chris Nordgren, Jordi Roca	Foreign Gnomes, Surefire.Games	March 4, 2021	
Everspace	Rockfish Games	Rockfish Games	December 11, 2018	
Everybody 1-2-Switch!	Nintendo EPD, NDcube	Nintendo	June 30, 2023	
Everybody’s Golf: Hot Shots	HYDE	Bandai Namco Entertainment	September 5, 2025	
Everyday Today's Menu for the Emiya Family	Aniplex	Aniplex	April 28, 2021	
Everything	David OReilly	Double Fine Productions	January 10, 2019	
Evoland: Legendary Edition	Shiro Games	Shiro Games	February 7, 2019	
Exception	Traxmaster Software	Traxmaster Software	August 13, 2019	
The Exit 8	Kotake Create	Playism	April 17, 2024	
Exit the Gungeon	Dodge Roll Games	Devolver Digital	March 17, 2020	
Exophobia	Zarc Attack	PM Studios	July 23, 2024	
The Expanse: A Telltale Series	Telltale Games, Deck Nine	Telltale Games	April 16, 2026	
Expeditions: A MudRunner Game	Saber Interactive	Focus Entertainment	March 5, 2024	
ExZeus: The Complete Collection	Sickhead Games	Zigguat Interactive	September 30, 2021	
F-Zero 99	Nintendo Software Technology	Nintendo	September 14, 2023	
Fading Afternoon	Yeo	Circle Entertainment	June 6, 2024	
Fae Farm	Phoenix Labs	Phoenix Labs	September 8, 2023	
Faeria	Abrakam Entertainment	Versus Evil	August 13, 2020	
Fairy Fencer F: Advent Dark Force	Compile Heart	Idea Factory	January 17, 2019	
Fairy Knights	WID Studio	CFK	April 30, 2020	
Fairy Tail	Gust Co. Ltd.	Koei Tecmo	July 30, 2020	
The Falconeer: Warrior Edition	Tomas Sala	Wired Productions	August 5, 2021	
The Fall	Over the Moon	Over the Moon	May 10, 2018	
The Fall Part 2: Unbound	Over the Moon	Over the Moon	February 13, 2018	
Fall Guys: Ultimate Knockout	Mediatonic	Devolver Digital	June 21, 2022	
Fallback	Endroad	Microids	TBA	
Fallen Legion: Revenants	Yummy Yummy Tummy	NIS America	February 16, 2021	
Fallen Legion: Rise to Glory	Yummy Yummy Tummy	Nippon Ichi Software	May 29, 2018	
Fallout Shelter	Bethesda Game Studios, Behaviour Interactive	Bethesda Softworks	June 10, 2018	
Famicom Detective Club: The Missing Heir	Nintendo EPD, Mages	Nintendo	May 14, 2021	
Famicom Detective Club: The Girl Who Stands Behind	Nintendo EPD, Mages	Nintendo	May 14, 2021	
Family Feud	Snap Finger Click	Ubisoft	November 12, 2020	
Family Tennis SP	Arc System Works	Arc System Works	November 28, 2019	
Family Trainer	h.a.n.d.	Bandai Namco Entertainment	December 17, 2020	
Fantasy Beauties	Somequest	Somequest	July 26, 2024	
Fantasy Hero: Unsigned Legacy	Arc System Works	Arc System Works	January 25, 2018	
Fantasy Life i: The Girl Who Steals Time	Level-5 Osaka Office	Level-5	May 21, 2025	
Fantasy Maiden Wars: Dream of the Stray Dreamer	Sanbondo	Sanbondo, Phoenixx	2026	
Fantasy Strike	Sirlin Games	Sirlin Games	July 25, 2019	
Fantasy Tavern Sextet Vol. 1: New World Days	Qureate	Qureate	November 5, 2020	
Fantasy Tavern Sextet Vol. 2: Adventurer's Days	Qureate	Qureate	January 14, 2021	
Fantasy Tavern Sextet Vol. 3: Postlude Days	Qureate	Qureate	March 18, 2021	
Far: Changing Tides	Okomotive	JP: H2 Interactive; WW: Mixtvision Games	March 1, 2022	
Far: Lone Sails	Okomotive	JP: H2 Interactive; WW: Mixtvision Games	August 18, 2019	
Farmagia	Marvelous	JP: Marvelous; NA: Marvelous USA; EU: Marvelous Europe	November 1, 2024	
Farming Simulator	Giants Software	Focus Home Interactive	November 7, 2017	
Farming Simulator 20	Giants Software	Focus Home Interactive	December 3, 2019	
Fast RMX	Shin'en Multimedia	Shin'en Multimedia	March 3, 2017	
Fatal Fury: First Contact	Code Mystics	SNK	December 23, 2020	
Fatal Frame: Maiden of Black Water	Koei Tecmo	Koei Tecmo	October 28, 2021	
Fatal Frame: Mask of the Lunar Eclipse	Koei Tecmo, Grasshopper Manufacture	Koei Tecmo	March 9, 2023	
Fatal Twelve	Aiueo Kompany	Prototype	July 21, 2021	
Fate/Extella Link	Marvelous	Xseed Games	January 31, 2019	
Fate/Extella: The Umbral Star	Marvelous	Xseed Games	July 20, 2017	
Fault Milestone One	Alice in Dissonance	Sekai Games	October 3, 2019	
Fault Milestone Two Side: Above	Alice in Dissonance	Phoenixx	December 3, 2020	
Fe	Zoink	EA Originals	February 16, 2018	
Fear Effect Sedna	Sushee	Square Enix	March 6, 2018	
Felix the Reaper	Kong Orange	Daedalic Entertainment	October 17, 2019	
Fell Seal: Arbiter’s Mark	6 Eyes Studio	JP: DMM Games; WW: 1C Company	August 14, 2019	
Feudal Alloy	Attu Games	Attu Games	January 17, 2019	
Fez	Polytron	Polytron	April 14, 2021	
FIA European Truck Racing Championship	N-Racing	Bigben Interactive	August 5, 2019	
FIFA 18	EA Canada	EA Sports	September 29, 2017	
FIFA 19	EA Canada	EA Sports	September 28, 2018	
FIFA 20	EA Canada	EA Sports	September 27, 2019	
FIFA 21	EA Canada	EA Sports	October 9, 2020	
FIFA 22	EA Canada	EA Sports	October 1, 2021	
FIFA 23	EA Canada	EA Sports	September 30, 2022	
Fight Crab	Calappa Games	Mastiff	August 20, 2020	
Fight For America: Complete Edition	QubicGames	QubicGames	December 27, 2025	
Fight of Gods	Digital Crafter	Digital Crafter	January 18, 2019	
Fighting EX Layer: Another Dash	Arika	Arika	April 1, 2021	
Figment	Bedtime Digital Games	Bedtime Digital Games	June 28, 2018	
Filament	Beard Envy	Kasedo Games	October 1, 2020	
Final Fantasy VII	Square Enix	Square Enix	March 26, 2019	
Final Fantasy VIII	Square Enix	Square Enix	September 3, 2019	
Final Fantasy IX	Square Enix	Square Enix	February 13, 2019	
Final Fantasy X/X-2 HD Remaster	Square Enix, Virtuos	Square Enix	April 11, 2019	
Final Fantasy XII: The Zodiac Age	Square Enix, Virtuos	Square Enix	April 25, 2019	
Final Fantasy XV: Pocket Edition	Square Enix	Square Enix	September 13, 2018	
Final Fantasy: Crystal Chronicles Remastered Edition	Square Enix	Square Enix	August 27, 2020	
Final Fantasy Tactics: The Ivalice Chronicles	Square Enix	Square Enix	September 30, 2025	
The Final Station	Do My Best Games	TinyBuild	February 23, 2018	
Final Vendetta	Bitmap Bureau	Numskull Games	June 17, 2022	
Fire Emblem Engage	Intelligent Systems, Koei Tecmo	Nintendo	January 20, 2023	
Fire Emblem: Three Houses	Intelligent Systems, Koei Tecmo	Nintendo	July 26, 2019	
Fire Emblem Warriors	Omega Force, Team Ninja	Nintendo	September 28, 2017	
Fire Emblem Warriors: Three Hopes	Omega Force, Team Ninja	Nintendo	June 24, 2022	
Firefighting Rescue Simulator	MORAHAN Studio Games	MORAHAN Studio Games	December 27, 2025	
Fire Tonight	Reptoid Games	Way Down Deep	August 12, 2021	
Firewatch	Campo Santo	Panic, Campo Santo	December 17, 2018	
The First Tree	David Wehle	Studio DO Games	November 29, 2018	
Fishing Star World Tour	WFS	WFS	January 31, 2019	
Fishing: Barents Sea Complete Edition	Misc Games	Astragon Entertainment	December 10, 2019	
F.I.S.T.: Forged In Shadow Torch	TiGames	Bilibili	July 12, 2022	
Fitness Boxing	Imagineer	JP: Imagineer; WW: Nintendo	December 20, 2018	
Fitness Boxing 2: Rhythm and Exercise	Imagineer	JP: Imagineer; WW: Nintendo	December 3, 2020	
Fitness Boxing 3: Your Personal Trainer	Imagineer	JP: Imagineer; WW: Nintendo	December 5, 2024	
Fitness Boxing feat. Hatsune Miku: Isshoni Exercise	Imagineer	Imagineer	March 7, 2024	
Fitness Boxing Fist of the North Star	Imagineer	Imagineer	December 22, 2022	
Five Nights at Freddy's	Clickteam	Clickteam	November 29, 2019	
Five Nights at Freddy's 2	Clickteam	Clickteam	November 29, 2019	
Five Nights at Freddy's 3	Clickteam	Clickteam	November 29, 2019	
Five Nights at Freddy's 4	Clickteam	Clickteam	November 29, 2019	
Five Nights at Freddy's: Help Wanted	Steel Wool Games	Steel Wool Games	May 21, 2020	
Five Nights at Freddy's: Security Breach	Steel Wool Studios	ScottGames	April 19, 2023	
Five Nights at Freddy's: Sister Location	Clickteam	Clickteam	June 18, 2020	
The Flame in the Flood	The Molasses Flood	JP: Teyon; WW: Curve Digital	October 12, 2017	
Flashback	Paul Cuisset	Microids	June 7, 2018	
Flashback 2	Microids	Microids	November 16, 2023	
Flat Heroes	Parallel Circles	Deck13	August 2, 2018	
Flinthook	Tribute Games	Tribute Games	March 8, 2018	
Flip Wars	Over Fence	Nintendo	May 18, 2017	
Florence	Mountains	Annapurna Interactive	February 13, 2020	
Food Girls	Simon Creative, Storia	Justdan International	November 26, 2020	
Football Manager Touch 2018	Sports Interactive	Sega	April 13, 2018	
Football Manager Touch 2019	Sports Interactive	Sega	November 27, 2018	
Football Manager Touch 2020	Sports Interactive	Sega	December 10, 2019	
Football Manager Touch 2021	Sports Interactive	Sega	December 14, 2020	
Forager	HopFrog	Humble Bundle	July 30, 2019	
The Forbidden Arts	Stingbot Games	Stingbot Games	August 7, 2019	
Foregone	Big Blue Bubble	Big Blue Bubble	October 5, 2020	
Forestrike	Skeleton Crew Studio	Devolver Digital	November 17, 2025	
Forgotten Hill Disillusion	FM Studio	Ratalaika Games	December 17, 2021	
Forgotton Anne	ThroughLine Games	Square Enix	November 9, 2018	
Forma.8	MixedBag	MixedBag	August 24, 2017	
Fortnite Battle Royale	Epic Games	Epic Games	June 11, 2018	
Forward to the Sky	Animu Game	Cosen	February 25, 2021	
The Fox Awaits Me HANA	TALESshop	Cosen	November 2, 2023	
Fox N Forests	Bonus Level Entertainment	EuroVideo	May 17, 2018	
Fractured Minds	Emily Mitchell	Wired Productions	November 14, 2017	
Frane: Dragons' Odyssey	Exe Create	Kemco	May 9, 2019	
Freddy Fazbear's Pizzeria Simulator	Clickteam	Clickteam	October 31, 2020	
Freedom Finger	Wide Right Interactive	JP: EastAsiaSoft; WW: Wide Right Interactive	September 27, 2019	
Freedom Planet	GalaxyTrail	GalaxyTrail	August 30, 2018	
Freedom Planet 2	GalaxyTrail	GalaxyTrail	April 4, 2024	
Friday the 13th: The Game	Black Tower Studios	Gun Media	August 13, 2019	
The Friends of Ringo Ishikawa	Yeo	Circle Entertainment	April 4, 2019	
Frogun	Molegato	Top Hat Studios, Inc	August 2, 2022	
Front Mission 1st: Remake	MegaPixel Studio	Forever Entertainment	November 30, 2022	
Fuga: Melodies of Steel	CyberConnect2	CyberConnect2	July 29, 2021	
Fuga: Melodies of Steel 2	CyberConnect2	CyberConnect2	May 11, 2023	
Fuga: Melodies of Steel 3	CyberConnect2	CyberConnect2	May 29, 2025	
Full Kiss SS	Giga	Entergram	October 28, 2021	
Funko Fusion	10:10 Games	10:10 Games	November 15, 2024	
Fureraba: Friend to Lover	SMEE	NekoNyan	TBA	
Furi	The Game Bakers	The Game Bakers	January 11, 2018	
Fuser	Harmonix	NCSoft	November 10, 2020	
Futago Usagi no Gokinjo Turismo	PiXEL	PiXEL	May 30, 2024	
Fuyu Kiss	Giga	Entergram	November 25, 2021	
Fuyuzono Sacrifice	Otomate	Idea Factory	February 27, 2025	
Gal Guardians: Demon Purge	Inti Creates	Inti Creates	February 23, 2023	
Gal Gun 2	Inti Creates	JP: Inti Creates; WW: PQube	March 15, 2018	
Gal Gun: Double Peace	Inti Creates	JP: Inti Creates; WW: PQube	March 17, 2022	
Gal Gun Returns	Inti Creates	JP: Inti Creates; WW: PQube	January 28, 2021	
Gal Metal	DMM Games	DMM Games	February 8, 2018	
Galak-Z: Variant S	17-Bit	GungHo Online Entertainment	June 28, 2018	
Galaxy of Pen & Paper +1 Edition	Behold Studios	Behold Studios	April 8, 2020	
Game Builder Garage	Nintendo EPD	Nintendo	June 11, 2021	
Game Dev Story	Kairosoft	JP: Kairosoft; WW: SNK	October 11, 2018	
Game Dev Tycoon	Greenheart Games	Greenheart Games	October 8, 2020	
The Game Paradise: Crusin Mix Special	City Connection	City Connection	December 19, 2019	
Gamedec	Anshar Studios	Anshar Studios	July 1, 2022	
Gang Beasts	Boneloaf	Boneloaf	October 12, 2021	
Garage	Zombie Dynamics	TinyBuild	May 10, 2018	
Garbage Pail Kids: Mad Mike and the Quest for Stale Gum	Digital Eclipse, Retrotainment Games	iam8bit	October 25, 2022	
Garden Story	Picogram	Rose City Games	August 11, 2021	
The Gardens Between	The Voxel Agents	The Voxel Agents	September 20, 2018	
Garfield Kart: Furious Racing	Microids	Microids	November 7, 2019	
Gargoyles Remastered	Empty Clip Studios	Disney Games	October 19, 2023	
Gato Roboto	Doinksoft	Devolver Digital	May 30, 2019	
Gear.Club Unlimited	Eden Games	Microids	November 21, 2017	
Gear.Club Unlimited 2	Eden Games	Microids	December 4, 2018	
Gekido: Kintaro's Revenge	Naps Team	Naps Team	March 22, 2018	
Gem Smashers	Treva Entertainment	Treva Entertainment	March 15, 2018	
Genesis Noir	Feral Cat Den	Fellow Traveller Games	March 26, 2021	
Genkai Tokki: Seven Pirates H	Felistella	JP: Compile Heart; WW: Eastasiasoft	February 3, 2022	
Genshin Impact	miHoYo	miHoYo	TBA	
Gensō Rōgoku no Kaleidoscope	07th Expansion	Entergram	December 17, 2020	
Gensou SkyDrift	illuCalab	Unties	December 12, 2019	
Georifters	Busy Toaster Games	Leoful	September 18, 2020	
Gerda: A Flame in Winter	PortaPlay	Dontnod Entertainment	September 1, 2022	
Gesshizu: Mori no Chiisana Nakama-tachi	Nippon Columbia	Nippon Columbia	July 22, 2020	
Getsu Fūma Den: Undying Moon	GuruGuru	Konami	February 9, 2022	
Ghost 1.0	unepic_fran	Francis Cota	July 12, 2018	
Ghost Parade	Lentera	JP: FuRyu; WW: Aksys Games	October 31, 2019	
Ghost Trick: Phantom Detective	Capcom	Capcom	June 30, 2023	
Ghostbusters: Spirits Unleashed – Ecto Edition	IllFonic	IllFonic	October 19, 2023	
Ghostbusters: The Video Game Remastered	Saber Interactive	JP: H2 Interactive; WW: Mad Dog Games	October 4, 2019	
Ghost of a Tale	SeithCG	Plug In Digital	October 8, 2020	
Ghostrunner	One More Level, 3D Realms, Slipgate Ironworks	All in! Games, 505 Games	December 9, 2020	
Ghosts 'n Goblins Resurrection	Capcom	Capcom	February 25, 2021	
Ghoul Patrol	Dotemu	Lucasfilm Games	June 29, 2021	
G.I. Joe: Operation Blackout	IguanaBee	NA: GameMill Entertainment; EU: Maximum Games	October 13, 2020	
GigaBash	Passion Republic	Passion Republic	August 3, 2023	
Giana Sisters: Twisted Dreams	Black Forest Games	THQ Nordic, HandyGames	September 27, 2018	
Gibbous: A Cthulhu Adventure	Stuck in Attic	Stuck in Attic	October 21, 2020	
Giga Wrecker Alt.	Game Freak	Rising Star Games	May 2, 2019	
Gigantosaurus: The Game	Cyber Group Studios	Outright Games	March 27, 2020	
Gimmick! 2	Bitwave Games	Clear River Games, Sunsoft	September 5, 2024	
Ginger: Beyond the Crystal	Drakhar Studio	BadLand Games	November 17, 2017	
Giraffe and Annika	Atelier Mimina	JP: Playism; WW: NIS America	August 25, 2020	
Glaive: Brick Breaker	Blue Sunset Games	Blue Sunset Games	April 26, 2018	
Gley Lancer	Masaya, Shinyuden	Ratalaika Games	October 15, 2021	
Glitched	En House Studios	Digerati	TBA	
Gloomhaven	Saber Interactive	Twin Sails Interactive	September 18, 2023	
Gloria Union: Twin Fates in Blue Ocean FHD Edition	Sting Entertainment	Atlus	March 18, 2021	
Gnosia	Petit Depotto	Petit Depotto	April 30, 2020	
Go-Go Town	Prideful Sloth	CULT Games	2026	
Go Vacation	Bandai Namco Studios	Nintendo	July 27, 2018	
Goat Simulator: The GOATY	Coffee Stain Studios	Double Eleven	January 23, 2019	
Goblin Sword	Gelato Games	JP: Rainy Frog; WW: Gelato Games	February 13, 2020	
God Eater 3	Marvelous First Studio	Bandai Namco Entertainment	July 11, 2019	
God of Rock	Modus Studios Brazil	Modus Games	April 18, 2023	
God Wars: The Complete Legend	Kadokawa Shoten	JP: Kadokawa Shoten; WW: NIS America	June 14, 2018	
Gods Remastered	Robot Riot	Robot Riot	March 28, 2019	
Godzilla: Destroy All Monsters Melee - Remastered	Pipeworks Software	Atari	November 3, 2026	
Goetia	Sushee	Square Enix	April 26, 2018	
Going Under	Aggro Crab Games	Team17	September 24, 2020	
Golden Force	Storybird Studio	Just For Games, PixelHeart	January 28, 2021	
Golf Club: Wasteland	Demagog Studios	Untold Tales	September 3, 2021	
Golf Story	Sidebar Games	Sidebar Games	September 28, 2017	
Golf with Your Friends	Blacklight Interactive	Team17	May 19, 2020	
Golf Zero	Colin Lane Games	Ratalaika Games	September 11, 2020	
Gone Home	Fullbright	Fullbright	September 6, 2018	
Gonner	Art in Heart	Raw Fury	June 29, 2017	
Gonner 2	Art in Heart	Raw Fury	October 22, 2020	
Good Job!	Paladin	Nintendo	March 26, 2020	
The Good Life	White Owls	Playism	October 15, 2021	
Good Pizza, Great Pizza	TapBlaze	PM Studios	September 3, 2020	
Goodnight Universe	Nice Dream	Skybound Games	December 18, 2025	
Goosebumps: The Game	WayForward	GameMill Entertainment	October 9, 2018	
Gori: Cuddly Carnage	Angry Demon Studio	Wired Productions	August 29, 2024	
Gorogoa	Buried Signal	Annapurna Interactive	December 14, 2017	
Gotcha Racing 2nd	Arc System Works	Arc System Works	March 29, 2018	
Gothic Classic	Piranha Bytes	THQ Nordic	September 28, 2023	
Gothic Murder: Adventure That Changes Destiny	Orange	Orange	March 12, 2020	
Graceful Explosion Machine	Vertex Pop	Vertex Pop	April 6, 2017	
Grand Exile	Studio Pico	Studio Pico	TBA	
Grand Theft Auto: The Trilogy – The Definitive Edition	Grove Street Games	Rockstar Games	November 11, 2021	
Grandia HD Collection	Game Arts	GungHo Online Entertainment	August 16, 2019	
Grapple Dog	Medallion Games	Super Rare Games	October 27, 2022	
Graveyard Keeper	Lazy Bear Games	TinyBuild	June 27, 2019	
Graze Counter GM	Bikkuri Software	Henteko Doujin	January 19, 2023	
Greak: Memories of Azur	Navegante Entertainment	Team17	August 17, 2021	
The Great Ace Attorney Chronicles	Capcom	Capcom	July 27, 2021	
The Great Perhaps	Caligari Games	Drageus Games	July 10, 2020	
Green Hell	Creepy Jar	Forever Entertainment	October 8, 2020	
Grid Autosport	Codemasters	Feral Interactive	September 19, 2019	
Griftlands	Klei Entertainment	Klei Entertainment	June 4, 2021	
Grime	Clover Bite	Akupara Games	January 25, 2024	
Grim Fandango Remastered	Double Fine Productions	Double Fine Productions	November 1, 2018	
GrimGrimoire OnceMore	Vanillaware	Nippon Ichi Software	July 28, 2022	
Grimvalor	Direlight	Direlight	April 7, 2020	
Grindstone	Capybara Games	Capybara Games	December 15, 2020	
Grip: Combat Racing	Caged Element	Wired Productions	November 6, 2018	
Gripper	OctoBox Interactive	OctoBox Interactive	March 29, 2023	
Gris	Nomada Studio	Devolver Digital	December 13, 2018	
The Grisaia Trilogy	Frontwing	Prototype	November 7, 2019	
Grisaia: Phantom Trigger Vol. 01&02	Frontwing	Prototype	June 25, 2020	
Grisaia: Phantom Trigger Vol. 03	Frontwing	Prototype	July 22, 2020	
Grisaia: Phantom Trigger Vol. 04	Frontwing	Prototype	September 17, 2020	
Grisaia: Phantom Trigger Vol. 05	Frontwing	Prototype	November 19, 2020	
Grisaia: Phantom Trigger Vol. 5.5	Frontwing	Prototype	January 21, 2021	
Grisaia: Phantom Trigger Vol. 06	Frontwing	Prototype	September 22, 2021	
Grood	CC_ARTS	Drageus Games	October 23, 2020	
Groove Coaster: Wai Wai Party	Taito	Taito	November 7, 2019	
Grounded	Double Eleven	Xbox Game Studios	April 16, 2024	
Grow: Song of the Evertree	Prideful Sloth	505 Games	November 16, 2021	
Growtopia	Ubisoft Abu Dhabi	Ubisoft	July 18, 2019	
Guacamelee!	DrinkBox Studios	DrinkBox Studios	October 8, 2018	
Guacamelee! 2	DrinkBox Studios	DrinkBox Studios	December 10, 2018	
Guardian Tales	Kong Studios	Kong Studios	October 3, 2022	
Guild of Darksteel	Igor Sandman	Digerati	July 15, 2021	
Guilty Gear XX Accent Core Plus R	Arc System Works	Arc System Works	May 16, 2019	
Guilty Gear	Arc System Works	Arc System Works	May 16, 2019	
Guitar Life: Lesson 1	HORI	HORI	April 25, 2024	
Gun Gun Pixies	Shade	JP: Idea Factory; WW: PQube	September 6, 2019	
Gunbrella	Doinksoft	Devolver Digital	September 13, 2023	
Gunka o Haita Neko	Primula	Prototype	June 18, 2020	
Gunlord X	NGDEV	JP: EastAsiaSoft; WW: NGDEV	May 22, 2019	
Gunman Clive HD Collection	Hörberg Productions	JP: Flyhigh Works; WW: Hörberg Productions	January 17, 2019	
Guns, Gore & Cannoli 2	Crazy Monkey Studios	Crazy Monkey Studios	August 2, 2018	
Gunvein	NGDEV	NGDEV	May 11, 2023	
Gunvolt Chronicles: Luminous Avenger iX	Inti Creates	Inti Creates	September 26, 2019	
Gunvolt Chronicles: Luminous Avenger iX 2	Inti Creates	Inti Creates	January 27, 2022	
Gunvolt Records Cychronicle	Inti Creates	Inti Creates	January 15, 2024	
Gynoug	Masaya, Shinyuden	Ratalaika Games	November 12, 2021	
