= Deep Sky Derelicts =

2018 video game

- Developer: Snowhound Games
- Publisher: Fulqrum Publishing
- Engine: Unity
- Platforms: Linux; macOS; Windows; Nintendo Switch; PlayStation 4; Xbox One
- Release: Linux, macOS, Windows; September 26, 2018; Switch, PS4, Xbox One; March 24, 2020
- Genre: Dungeon crawl
- Mode: Single-player

Deep Sky Derelicts is a dungeon crawl video game developed by Snowhound Games and published by Fulqrum Publishing. It combines elements of traditional role-playing video games and roguelike deck-building games. Players create a custom crew, who explore and scavenge derelict space ships. It was first released in 2018 and was ported to consoles in 2020.

== Gameplay ==
Players create and customize three crew members sent to scavenge derelict spaceships. Each character can choose from seven character classes. Exploring derelicts is done via a 2D, procedurally-generated automap that simulates graph paper. The rest of the game uses an art style similar to comic books. While exploring, energy is expended for life support. If energy runs out, the characters are injured. When encountering hostile monsters or scavengers, combat is resolved through turn-based combat using cards. A character's class and gear provide them with cards, which are shuffled and drawn randomly. If these cards are not useful, new ones can be drawn, but this costs energy. Each character has health and shields. Shields regenerate after combat, but health does not. The only way to recover health is by paying a medic. Hardcore mode enforces permadeath, but players are otherwise able to load saved games to redo a failed combat or exploration mission. Besides scavenging random derelicts, players can take side missions.

== Development ==
Deep Sky Derelicts was developed by Snowhound Games, a Finnish company headquartered in Jyväskylä. The developers cited Darkest Dungeon, XCOM, Hearthstone, and FTL: Faster Than Light as inspirations. Deep Sky Derelicts entered early access in November 2017 and was released on September 26, 2018. Two DLC were released: New Prospects on May 30, 2019, and Station Life on December 12, 2019. The game was ported to the Nintendo Switch, PlayStation 4, and Xbox One on March 24, 2020. This version, under the subtitle Definitive Edition, bundles both DLC.

== Reception ==
On Metacritic, the PC and Xbox One versions of Deep Sky Derelicts received mixed reviews, and the Nintendo Switch version received positive reviews. Rock Paper Shotgun's reviewer praised the combat, saying that the ability to control which cards went into his deck overcame his dislike of deck-building games. Though he criticized the game for its lack of a tutorial, he said the combat is "great fun, never over-complicated". Gamereactor UK called the art and music "brilliant" and praised the combat, though they said it "can sometimes be a slog". A perceived poor user interface and severe difficulty spikes kept the reviewer from making a wholehearted recommendation. After overcoming a steep learning curve, Nintendo World Report's reviewer found the game enjoyable. 4Players recommended it to fans of Darkest Dungeon, though they said Deep Sky Derelicts was not quite as good.
