= Goblin Sword =

2014 platforming video game

- Developer: Eleftherios Christodoulatos
- Publisher: Gelato Games (NS)
- Programmer: John Christodoulatos
- Artist: Lefteris Christodoulatos
- Platforms: iOS, Nintendo Switch
- Release: iOS: WW: September 11, 2014; Switch: WW: February 13, 2020
- Genre: Platform

Goblin Sword is a 2D platform video game created by developer Eleftherios Christodoulatos. It was released for iOS on 11 September 2014, and Nintendo Switch on February 13, 2020.

== Gameplay ==
The game involves 'slaying as many monsters as a player can, collect loot, avoid dangerous traps and defeat menacing bosses, before facing the evil wizard himself'.

It has 89 levels each with 2 treasure chests, usually hidden behind a 'fake wall'. There are also crystal shards, which are collected to unlock secret levels. In the game, there is a limited amount of health. Every time a player gets hit, they lose one heart. If the player was to fall down a pit, they would lose all health.

There are currently 24 weapons and relics, as well as 36 achievements.

The game is set in a medieval fantasy genre and has settings such as forests, caves and castles. When you kill a monster, you will receive coins (or a group of coins called a gem). These coins can be used to buy things, such as weapons or armour.

It has main areas, including Great Forest, Ancient Castle, Dark Caves, Lost City and Sacred Ruins.

There are several bosses in the game.

If you clear 100% of each area, you can unlock more things and a different ending if you clear them all.

== Reception ==
Reception

Aggregate score
Aggregator	Score
Metacritic	80/100

Review score
Publication	Score
TouchArcade	5/5

Goblin Sword has received "generally favorable" reviews according to review aggregator Metacritic.

TouchArcade praised its difficulty level.

MacRumors considered it one of their top 5 iOS apps worth checking out.
