= Closed Nightmare =

2018 video game

- Developer: Nippon Ichi Software
- Publishers: AS: SEGA; JP: Nippon Ichi Software; KO: IntraGames
- Platforms: Nintendo Switch; PlayStation 4
- Release: JP: 19 July 2018; AS: 19 July 2018
- Genres: Adventure, horror
- Mode: Single-player

Closed Nightmare (Japanese: クローズド・ナイトメア) is a Japanese horror adventure game developed and published by Nippon Ichi Software for the Nintendo Switch and PlayStation 4. It was released in Japan on July 19, 2018. It was released with Chinese subtitles by Sega for the Asia-Pacific region on July 19, 2018. IntraGames published it in South Korea.

== Plot ==
The player assumes the role of Maria Kamishiro, who awakens in an unknown location without her memories and with her left arm paralyzed. A mysterious person named Chizuru forces her to engage in a strange experiment in order to escape.

While trying to find a way out, Maria meets with Eito Ginjo and Jun Yagi, two survivors who are also captured and locked up in the same location. They're being stalked by hostile masked people from the dark.

== Gameplay ==
In this screenshot, Maria is assembling a full-size mannequin from a variety of body parts.

The gameplay system has four parts: movie, text, exploration, and gimmick. Movie portions consist of live-action first-person cutscenes. Text portions require users to select options which may alter story progression. Exploration involves the player examining their surroundings. The player will then apply what they have learned during exploration to the gimmick portion to solve various challenges.

== Development ==
The game was initially revealed as "project Nightmare" in January 2018. In April 2018, Nippon Ichi Software revealed the final title of the game and released a teaser trailer showcasing live-action footage from the game.

== Promotion ==
To promote the game, NIS released a Closed Nightmare smartphone game called 360° Escape Game which is available for iOS and Android. A campaign was featured that for anyone who can finish the game in 15 seconds or less, players would be able to enter their name into a raffle to get a free copy of the game. The campaign ended on July 15, 2018.
