= Detective Instinct: Farewell, My Beloved =

2025 video game

- Developer: Armonica LLC
- Publisher: Armonica LLC
- Director: Joey Lopes
- Writer: Joey Lopes
- Composer: Joey Lopes
- Platforms: Nintendo Switch, Windows
- Release: November 26, 2025
- Genre: Adventure

Detective Instinct: Farewell, My Beloved is a 2025 adventure game by Armonica LLC. It involves a mystery where a passenger on a train bound for London vanishes, leading the player and their friend Emma to investigate their whereabouts.

The game was the first game by Armonica, a four-person development team based in the United States. The team had known each other from various internet forums and re-grouped during the COVID-19 pandemic period to develop a game influenced by earlier Japanese adventure games. The game was described as having "generally favorable reviews" by the review aggregator Metacritic.

== Plot and gameplay ==
In Detective Instinct: Farewell, My Beloved, players interrogate witnesses and investigate their surroundings to find clues and locate a missing person. The game is set in an ambiguous period between the 1990s and 2000s, where the player is an American college student studying abroad in Europe with their friend Emma and a professor. Most of the game takes place on the player's and Emma's train journey to London.

The player has the option to move from scene to scene, investigate locations or talk to people to discover clues and information to advance the story. A list of action commands is -present on the left-hand side of the screen, with various commands such as "Check", "Talk", "Think", and "Show" depending on the in-game situation. Players can also choose "Discuss" with Emma, which can either be a hint at how to move forward or be required to progress the game.

The game is divided into five chapters, with each chapter including a review where players answer questions about the investigation.

== Development ==
Detective Instinct: Farewell, My Beloved was developed and published by the four-person American studio Armonica LLC. It is the first project by Armonia. The game's writer, director, and composer was Joey Lopes. The rest of the team consisted of two brothers, Harry and Andrew, who created the art in the game; and Erik, who programmed the game. All knew each other from various internet forums in the late 2000s and early 2010s.

The group re-connected during the COVID-19 pandemic, and to work on a Japanese-styled adventure game being specifically influenced by the games Ace Attorney and Famicom Detective Club. For the narrative, Lopes specifically recalled Alfred Hitchcock's The Lady Vanishes (1938) as he did not want the narrative it to be a murder mystery or whodunnit and also did not want it to parody this kind of story as titles like The Murder of Sonic the Hedgehog (2023) had done.

== Release and reception ==
Reception

Aggregate scores
Aggregator	Score
Metacritic	(PC) 84/100
OpenCritic	88% recommend

While initially only set for release via Steam, Detective Instinct: Farewell, My Beloved was released for Windows via Steam and digitally for the Nintendo Switch November 26, 2025.

The PC version of Detective Instinct: Farewell, My Beloved received generally favorable reviews from critics, according to the review aggregation website Metacritic. Fellow review aggregator OpenCritic assessed that the game received strong approval, being recommended by 88% of critics.

Audra Bowling of RPG Fan said the gameplay was simple but well-polished, specifically saying that it that a lack of divergent paths or alternate endings did not rank the game high on replayability. An anonymous reviewer from Checkpoint Gaming said that "the game feels comfortably nostalgic to play, but the drawback is that it doesn't leave Detective Instinct with any distinct style to call its own."

Bowling complemented the game's blend of pixel art with 3D backgrounds as being "eye-catching visuals", along with a clear and concise user-interface and easy-to-read fonts. Alex Fuller of RPGamer echoed these statements, saying that its design borrowed from the recent past, which helped it differentiate itself from other titles in the genre. The reviewer in Checkpoint Gaming found the character's pixel art and "cartoonish shading" to be ill-suited to match the background environments, which were designed to be realistic and highly detailed by comparison.

Bowling found the story well-crafted with a proper and purposeful resolution. Fuller found it provided "an interesting, if perhaps not the most thrilling mystery." The Checkpoint Gaming review said that there should have been higher emotional stakes in the story, saying that "despite one suitably dramatic moment in the middle chapters, the final resolution feels like it comes too easily. Everybody’s just too reasonable."
