= Disc Jam =

2017 sports video game

- Developer: High Horse Entertainment
- Publisher: High Horse Entertainment
- Platforms: PlayStation 4, Microsoft Windows, Nintendo Switch
- Release: NA: March 7, 2017; EU: March 7, 2017; Nintendo Switch: WW: February 8, 2018
- Genre: Sports
- Modes: Single-player, multiplayer

Disc Jam is a video game for the PlayStation 4, Microsoft Windows and Nintendo Switch. Developed and published by High Horse Entertainment, it was one of the PlayStation Plus free games for download for the month of March 2017.

== Gameplay ==
The game combines elements of air hockey and tennis in a manner similar to the game Windjammers. However, while Windjammers is played from an overhead top-down perspective from the sidelines, Disc Jam is played from a behind the character, third-person perspective. The game feature 1 vs 1, and 2 vs 2 matches, allowing for up to four player multiplayer, either locally or online.

== Development and release ==
The game was first announced in June 2016 as part of E3 2016. A demo was available to play in September 2016 at Minecon 2016. The game is being developed by High Horse Entertainment, a studio formed by two ex-Activision employees who had previously worked on developing entries in the Tony Hawk, Call of Duty, and Guitar Hero series of video games. The game received a limited beta release on February 17, 2017. On March 1, 2017, the game was announced by Sony as one of the monthly free PS Plus games for March 2017, being made available on March 7, making its release date and PS Plus availability the same date.

== Reception ==
Reception

Aggregate score
Aggregator	Score
Metacritic	71/100 (PS4)

=== Pre-release ===
The game's beta release was generally well received. Sammy Barker of Push Square felt that the game had the potential to be the next Rocket League in a review of the beta version, due to its smooth online gameplay and high level of player customization, though he conceded it would need more improvement with its control and presentation before it would be ready for mainstream audiences. Many other journalists favorably compared the game to Rocket League as well, noting how both titles aimed to add a sci-fi twist with emphasis on online multiplayer, to a traditional sport.

=== Post-release ===
Disc Jam received average reviews, with a score of 71/100 on Metacritic.
