= Golf Zero =

2017 video game

- App icon
- Developer(s): Colin Games
- Publisher(s): Ratalaika Games (2020)
- Platform(s): iOS, Android, Flash, Xbox One, PlayStation 4, Nintendo Switch
- Release: iOS, Android; March 14, 2017; Xbox One, PlayStation 4, Nintendo Switch; September 9, 2020
- Genre(s): Platformer, sports
- Mode(s): Single-player

Golf Zero is a 2017 platformer golf video game developed by the Swedish studio Colin Games.

== Gameplay ==
In Golf Zero, the player must avoid hazards, jumping across chasms. However, the player has to golf a ball into the hole at the end of the level to complete it (instead of making it to the end alive). Balloons are also present in some levels, which need to be popped with a golf ball to receive the Gold Medal. Some levels also need to be completed within a time limit to receive the Gold Medal. The player is given three shots to get one ball into the hole.

== Reception ==
Reception

Aggregate score
| Aggregator | Score |
|---|---|
| Metacritic | 84/100 |

Review scores
| Publication | Score |
|---|---|
| Gamezebo | 3.5/5 |
| Pocket Gamer | 4.5/5 |
| TouchArcade | 4.5/5 |

On Metacritic, the game has a weighted average score of 84/100, indicating "generally favorable reviews". The original release of Golf Zero on mobile received mostly positive reviews, while the console version received more mixed reviews.
