= Curse of the Sea Rats =

2023 video game

- Developer: Petoons Studio
- Publisher: PQube
- Director: Dani del Amor
- Producer: Alba Sayós
- Designer: Alex Calvo
- Programmers: Alex Cortés; Alberto Guillén
- Artists: Àngel Durà; Marina D. Senosiain
- Composer: Max Ballet
- Engine: Unity
- Platforms: Nintendo Switch; PlayStation 4; PlayStation 5; Windows; Xbox One; Xbox Series X/S
- Release: WW: April 6, 2023
- Genre: Metroidvania
- Modes: Single-player, multiplayer

Curse of the Sea Rats is a Metroidvania video game developed by Barcelona-based Petoons Studio and published by PQube. The game was released on April 6, 2023, for the Nintendo Switch, PlayStation 4, PlayStation 5, Windows, Xbox One and Xbox Series X/S. It received critical praise for its artwork, but technical issues and problems with game balance were cited as negatives.

== Gameplay ==
A pirate witch transforms all the people on a prison ship into a rat. The ship's captain offers to grant amnesty to four of the prisoners if they defeat the witch. Curse of the Sea Rats is a Metroidvania game where players fight enemies across 2D platforms. Each of the four playable characters has their own set of unique skills, and up to four players can play at once. Players can switch between the characters at set points in the game. The art is hand-drawn.

== Development ==
Curse of the Sea Rats was crowdfunded in 2020 and became one of the most successful video games of the year. It was released for Windows, Nintendo Switch, PlayStation 4 and 5, and Xbox One and Series X/S on April 6, 2023.

== Reception ==
Reception

Aggregate score
Aggregator	Score		
Aggregator	NS	PC	PS5
Metacritic	59/100	66/100	63/100

Curse of the Sea Rats received an aggregate Metacritic score of 59/100 on Switch, 66/100 on PC and 63/100 on PS5, all indicating "mixed or average reviews".

In a December 2022 preview, Hardcore Gamer said "it shows incredible promise so far" and praised the voice acting, animation and visuals. After its release, Slant Magazine criticized the game's humor, calling it unfunny and out of place in what seems to be meant as a challenging game. They also felt the game did not use its concept or differentiate the protagonists enough. Commenting on the game balance, they said that the bosses were frequently too easy, yet the other enemies could sometimes defeat the protagonists with ease. Pocket Tactics praised the graphics but said that the game's difficulty will likely put off casual fans, and input delays on the Switch will frustrate hardcore gamers. NintendoWorldReport said the game "has a lot of potential, but the samey characters and bugs hold it back". Digitally Downloaded wrote that the game's audience is limited to those who "like the idea of quirky rats and humour to go with their challenging and unforgiving platforming".
