= Even the Ocean =

2016 video game

- Developer: Analgesic Productions
- Publisher: Analgesic Productions
- Designers: Melos Han-Tani; Marina Kittaka
- Programmer: Melos Han-Tani
- Artist: Marina Kittaka
- Writers: Marina Kittaka; Melos Han-Tani
- Composer: Melos Han-Tani
- Engine: HaxeFlixel
- Platforms: Windows; macOS
- Release: November 16, 2016
- Genres: Platform; action-adventure
- Mode: Single-player

Even the Ocean is an action-adventure platform video game developed by Analgesic Productions. The game was released on November 16, 2016 on Steam, itch.io, GOG.com, and Humble Store, for Microsoft Windows and Mac OS X.

The game includes platforming and story elements, putting the player in the role of Aliph, a Power Plant engineer working for the game's central city of Whiteforge.

== Gameplay ==
Even the Ocean is played by moving and jumping through side-on view places, such as beaches, cities, and the interiors of the world's mechanical and dangerous Power Plants. The game uses an energy bar mechanic that allows the player to gain more Light or Dark energy in order to jump higher or run faster.

Gameplay varies from cutscenes where Aliph talks with other characters in the game, to exploration of smaller towns and areas, to action platforming sections set inside of Power Plants.

== Plot ==
The story of Even the Ocean follows the events of Aliph as she begins her first day of work in the area of Fay Rouge. She is accompanied by senior technician, Cassidy, who dies in a disaster at Fay Rouge. After Aliph returns to Whiteforge City, the mayor, Richard Biggs, assigns her and two other technicians to repair other Power Plants in the world outside of Whiteforge. As she continues her travels, Aliph learns more about forces putting her world at risk, and eventually needs to step in to try and save it.

== Development ==
In March 2013, Even the Ocean began as two separate games, Even and The Ocean. Eventually the two games were combined into the final game, Even the Ocean, and the game was released onto Steam, itch.io and other storefronts on November 16, 2016. Regarding the mix of platforming and story, Han-Tani has stated that "the different segments of the game arose from wanting the game to incorporate reading-heavy and platforming-heavy sections—to show their interesting contrasts to players". The game was translated into Chinese, German, Russian, and Spanish. The Chinese translation was released on June 4, 2017, while the German subtitles as well as the Russian subtitles were added on November 27, 2017. An update on June 24, 2017 added Spanish localisation.

=== Music ===
Even the Ocean's soundtrack was composed by Han-Tani. At the time of Even the Ocean's release, the soundtrack was made available as a download-only on Han-Tani's online Bandcamp store and Even the Ocean's Steam store page, with the 88 songs in the game, as well as many bonus tracks, consisting of outtakes and unused songs. The total runtime, including the bonus songs, is almost six hours.

== Reception ==
Danielle Riendeau of Vice Media's Waypoint placed Even the Ocean at the #1 spot of her Top 10 Games of 2016 list, citing "its intricate level design, its quirky and colorful world, its characters and their awakening as citizens of a corrupt government".

Chloi Rad of IGN listed it on her list of 13 Awesome Games No One Talked About In 2016, citing that it was "all about balance — between the Light and Dark energy that fuel its world, but also the other contrasting forces that influence every facet of our lives. Nature and industry. Wealth and poverty", and that "in place of demanding difficulty, Even the Ocean instead provides a thought-provoking story with varied mechanics (like its interesting spin on an HP bar) that run gracefully parallel to its message".

Chris Priestman of Killscreen finds that "Perhaps even more intriguing, though, is how this energy system affects the logic and culture of Even the Ocean‘s world."
