= A Case of Distrust =

2018 video game

- Switch version digital art
- Developer: Ben Wander
- Publisher: Serenity Forge
- Engine: Unity
- Platforms: Windows, Macintosh, Switch, iOS
- Release: Macintosh, Windows: WW: 8 February 2018; Switch: WW: 20 September 2018; iOS: WW: 25 October 2019
- Genre: Adventure
- Mode: Single-player

A Case of Distrust is a 2018 video game created by independent developer Ben Wander and published by Serenity Forge. Described as a "narrative mystery", the game is a narrative adventure game in which the player solves a mystery in 1924 San Francisco as private investigator Phyllis Cadence Malone. The game was the first independent work of former Visceral Games developer Ben Wander, who was inspired to create the game based on research into the history of the 1920s and the desire to create a hardboiled mystery narrative. Upon release, A Case of Distrust received positive reviews from critics, with praise directed to the game's narrative, tone and visual presentation, and criticism of its investigation gameplay mechanics and ending.

== Gameplay ==
A Case of Distrust is an adventure game in which players progress by investigating scenes and interrogating suspects to solve the mystery by identifying the means, motive and opportunity of the murderer. Players can explore areas and interact with highlighted objects to collect items of evidence. To complete statements with characters, players use a notebook to select dialog options to ask the suspect, with available options reflecting goals of the investigation, available evidence and statements based on topics raised by suspects. Some statements issued by characters provide contradicting statements that can be used as evidence, or unlock new areas or suspects. Once the player pieces together enough information on the means, motive and opportunity, they can confront a suspect to accuse them of the murder. An ending scene revealing whether the player's accusation was correct and an exposition of the events that really occurred.

== Plot ==
In 1924 San Francisco, Phyllis Cadence Malone is a young woman making ends meet as a private investigator after leaving the police department following the death of her uncle Lewis, a fellow detective. She is approached by Mr. Green, a bootlegger and police informant who is receiving threats upon his life from 'The Black Hand'. After Mr. Green is discovered dead, Malone vows to continue investigating the case to discover the identity of his murderer, interrogating suspects including a jealous wife, rival bootlegger and local mobster.

== Development ==
The visual style of the game was influenced by the work of graphic designer Saul Bass.

A Case of Distrust was the first independent project by developer Ben Wander, a former Visceral Games staff member who left the studio to develop independent titles. Wander stated he was inspired by film noir and mystery literature, which he felt was an "underrepresented" genre in the video game medium. The writing of the game was intended to emulate a "hardboiled pulp" narrative, influenced by the writing of Dashiell Hammett and Raymond Chandler. The minimalistic visual presentation was inspired by the work of graphic designer Saul Bass. Wander researched real-life pioneering women to inform the design of main character Phyllis Malone, based on the pilot Amelia Earhart, with her backstory influenced by the life of policewoman Alice Stebbins Wells. The concept of Malone's story was based upon Wander's research into women's rights and suffrage in the 1920s, with an intent to explore the interrelated themes of social equality and racial and gender prejudice to "connect that period with our own". A Case of Distrust was showcased at several major festivals in 2017, including E3, IndieCade and the Indie Megabooth, with the game's appearance by E3 being highlighted as one of the best games of the show by Paste Magazine and Game Informer.

== Reception ==
Reception

Aggregate score
| Aggregator | Score |
|---|---|
| Metacritic | 77% |

Review scores
| Publication | Score |
|---|---|
| Adventure Gamers | 3/5 stars |
| Game Informer | 6.75 |
| Hardcore Gamer | 3.5/5 |
| Nintendo World Report | 8.5/10 |
| PC Gamer (US) | 78% |
| Polygon | 9/10 |

A Case of Distrust received "generally favorable" reviews, according to review aggregator Metacritic. Critics praised the game's writing and characterization. Colin Campbell of Polygon described the game as "one of the best narrative adventure games I've ever played...that tells its story with panache." Adventure Gamers highlighted the "thought" and "backstory" behind the game's characters. Game Informer remarked the game's dialogue was "well written" but not excessive "in terms of style or volume". Digitally Downloaded described the game's writing as "snappy" and having a "mature complexity", with "well-conveyed and engaging" characters. Nintendo World Report found the game to "create a stable of mysterious characters in remarkably little time".

Several critics praised the game's presentation and setting to be effective and evocative of the noir genre. Game Informer found the game's presentation to be "appealing and reminiscent of noir's classic juxtapositions of light and shadow", although light on "cinematic elements". PC Gamer observed the game to use its "setting and genre to great effect". Paste described the visual style as "immensely charming" and conveying a "minimalist appeal". Nintendo World Report found the "harsh lines and monochromatic style" to be "arresting" and "harken to the stark lighting of a black and white noir detective movie", but noted the visual style was "slightly anachronistic" for the 1920s, an observation shared by The Verge, noting the game's use of "cultural touchstones" from the '50s. Many reviewers highlighted the game's use of cab driver dialogue to convey its setting, with Rock Paper Shotgun finding the dialogue to "flesh out the world" and "draw (the player) deeper into the era", and Polygon describing the dialog as "enveloping (the player) in a rich sense of time and place".

Several reviewers were mixed on the characterization of the protagonist, Phyllis Malone. Paste found Malone's writing could be improved upon, noting the "hyperawareness of her gender and its associated inequalities" were depicted in an overt way. Polygon described Malone as lacking "emotional force and presence", citing her feminism as "earnest and glib". PC Gamer remarked that "there's not much to her character", citing her dispassionate and "clinical" internal monologue to the themes in the game. Game Informer found the themes of Malone's identity and relationship to the case were an "inelegant fit", finding it difficult to feel sentiments for the character.

Critics were also mixed on the design of the game's investigation mechanics and relationship to the ending. The Verge noted the game "slows down in the second half" and "it never feels like the investigation gets moving at a good pace". Hardcore Gamer found the limitations of investigation "frustrating", citing the absence of dialogue options for contradictions, and found the ending to be "underwhelming" and unrelated to the investigation. Game Informer similarly noted the "story's ending does not land" and expressed frustration of the "inherent trial and error" from "clocking on anything and everything". Adventure Gamers noted that dialog options, including making incorrect accusations had "no bearing on the main investigation" with the ending revealing the player's efforts were "basically meaningless".
