= Dead or School =

2018 video game

- Developer: Studio Nanafushi
- Publishers: Studio Nanafushi; Marvelous Entertainment (console)
- Producer: Yujiro Usada
- Platforms: Nintendo Switch, PlayStation 4, Windows
- Release: Windows: WW: July 13, 2018; Switch, PS4: JP: August 29, 2019; EU: March 13, 2020
- Genre: Hack-and-slash
- Modes: Single-player, multiplayer

Dead or School (Japanese: デッド・オア・スクール) is a 2018 hack-and-slash video game made by indie developer Studio Nanafushi for Windows and published by Marvelous Entertainment for Nintendo Switch and PlayStation 4.

== Synopsis ==
Gameplay screenshot depicting blood

Set in post-apocalyptic Tokyo, the game follows Hisako, a girl who lives underground and wishes to see the surface after a war forced her grandmother underground 70 years prior whose only memory of the real world were schools.

Along with hack-and-slash, Dead or School also has action RPG and platformer elements. The goal is for the player, as Hisako, to defeat monster enemies throughout Tokyo (Shinjuku, Asakusa, Akihabara, Roppongi).

== Reception ==
Dead or School received a mixed critical reception with an aggregate score of 65/100 on Metacritic. In a positive review, Pete Davison of Nintendo Life praised the stages, style and narrative, but noted a number of "technical jank". Digitally Downloaded wrote that "Being a budget game it struggles to maintain a consistency in tone and experience, but a solid loot and upgrade system, some great boss fights, and a good sense of humour, all help to see it through." MANiAC scored it 68%.

Both the PS4 and Switch versions received 31 out of 40 on Famitsu.
