= Chinese Parents =

2018 video game

- Developer: Moyuwan Games
- Publishers: Coconut Island Games; Littoral Games
- Platforms: macOS, Windows, Nintendo Switch, Android, IOS
- Release: Windows; September 29, 2018; Nintendo Switch; August 20, 2020; Android and IOS; May 11, 2022
- Genres: Life simulation, Raising simulation
- Mode: Single-player

Chinese Parents (Chinese: 中国式家长; pinyin: Zhōngguó Shì Jiāzhǎng) is a child-raising life simulation game by Beijing-based studio Moyuwan Games. It was published by Coconut Island Games on September 29, 2018, for Windows, August 20, 2020 for the Nintendo Switch, and May 11, 2022, for Android and IOS. The game was a bestseller on Steam and a success for the Chinese indie game market.

In the game, players manage the daily life of a Chinese student from infancy to adulthood and develop the student's skills for the university entrance exam. The game includes resource management elements. It includes cultural tropes and sarcasm.
