= De Mambo =

2017 platform video game

- Developer: The Dangerous Kitchen
- Publisher: Chorus Worldwide
- Engine: Unity
- Platform: Nintendo Switch; Linux; macOS; Microsoft Windows; PlayStation 4
- Release: JP: June 29, 2017; US: July 13, 2017; PAL: July 13, 2017
- Genres: Platform, Fighter
- Mode: Co-op mode; multiplayer; single-player

De Mambo is a platform game developed and self-published by The Dangerous Kitchen and published in Japan by Chorus Worldwide. It was released in Japan on June 29, 2017 and in the North American and PAL regions on July 13, 2017. The game has received "mixed or average reviews" according to review aggregator Metacritic.

== Gameplay ==
The game involves two-dimensional multiplayer combat where the players, each controlling a character shaped like a small ball, tries to knock other players off the stage. It can also be played in single player mode.

== Reception ==
According to Metacritic, De Mambo received an average score of 69/100 based on 9 critics indicating "mixed or average reviews". Writing for Nintendo Life, Ryan Craddock gave the game an 8/10, praising the stage variety which he noted brought a "wonderful freshness" to the game as he began to unlock more. Craddock also had positive things to say about how the game was "put together" noting how well the music and artstyle worked and lauded the menus and dialogue which he found to be "oozing with comedy". More negative comments were directed at the game's single player mode, which Craddock felt was lacking compared to its "hugely-loved" multi-player mode.

A more negative review came from Nintendo World Report's Casey Gibson, who, while complimenting the controls as "easy to grasp", found character movement in solo mode to be "frustrating". Praise was directed at the number of stages, with Gibson singling out the ones with hazards as being the "most fun" but Gibson ultimately felt that while there were "a ton" of stages the player would "burn out" before unlocking them all and that the action felt too "spread out" and surmised that the addition of some "outside factors" such as items would've been a welcome addition. Addressing the presentation of the game, Gibson noted that the found the visuals "appealing" and felt that the team did a "good job" with the music but found the "loud squeals" of the enemies in single player mode to be "annoying". Ultimately, Gibson found De Mambo to be a game with some "clever ideas", but felt that it was held back by its "limited features" lack of online play and "bland levels" and "not enough of a hook" to keep him "coming back for more". He gave the game a 6/10.
