= Dark Witch Music Episode: Rudymical =

2017 rhythm video game

- Developers: Inside System; Esquarda
- Publisher: Flyhigh Works
- Platforms: Nintendo Switch, Windows
- Release: Nintendo Switch; May 11, 2017; Windows; November 6, 2021
- Genre: Rhythm
- Mode: Single-player

Dark Witch Music: Rudymical is a rhythm game developed by Inside System and Esquarda and published by Flyhigh Works. It was released worldwide for the Nintendo Switch on March 11, 2017, then for Windows on November 6, 2021. The game received mixed reviews and currently has a score of 53 on Metacritic.

== Reception ==
Dark Witch Music Episode: Rudymical currently has a score of 53 on review aggregator site Metacritic, indicating "Mixed or average reviews".

Writing for Nintendo World Report, Justin Nation gave the game a positive review. He enjoyed the game's "substantial challenge" on higher difficulty settings whilst praising its simplicity on lower settings. He also applauded the range of musical styles employed by the game which, in his words, ranged from "traditional classical arrangements, to more pop-style tunes, to some that are more big band / jazz style." Nation ultimately gave the game a 7.5/10, noting that while the game is enjoyable and reasonably priced it was not for everyone, especially those who were not looking for Rudymical's "specific combination of elements".

A more negative review came from Nintendo Life's Ryan Craddock. He criticized the music which, in his opinion, did not "stick in your head or stand out" whilst playing and the notes which "don’t always feel like they are in the best place to complement the rhythm of the song – and at times don’t seem to fit at all", whilst noting that the higher difficulties "increase the complexity in the wrong way". He concluded the review by giving the game a 6/10 saying that while Dark Which Music Episode: Rudymical was not "a bad game" it was "rather underwhelming" and never lives up to the full potential of its concept (combat-based rhythm action).
