= Dust & Neon =

2023 video game

- Developer: David Marquardt Studios
- Publishers: Rogue Games; Netflix
- Producers: Trey Atwood; Glenn Ige
- Designer: David Marquardt
- Programmers: David Marquardt; Andreas Lundmark
- Artist: David Marquardt
- Composer: Makewaves Audio
- Platforms: Android; iOS; Nintendo Switch; Windows; PlayStation 5; Xbox Series X/S
- Release: Mobile, Switch, Win; WW: February 16, 2023; PS5, XBox; WW: August 17, 2023
- Genre: Twin-stick shooter
- Mode: Single-player

Dust & Neon is a twin-stick shooter video game developed by David Marquardt Studios. Rogue games published it for Switch, Windows, PlayStation 5, and Xbox Series X/S. On mobile devices, it is available exclusively for Netflix subscribers. Players control a reanimated cowboy who fights against robots.

== Gameplay ==
Players control a dead cowboy who has been reanimated by a mad scientist and sent out to defeat marauding robots. Dust & Neon is a twin-stick shooter using a Western theme. A hub world provides shops and missions. In combat, players must reload their weapon, which include pistols, shotguns, and rifles. They can find new weapons during missions or buy them at shops. Upon defeating foes, players can find money and cores. Cores are used for base-building, such as upgrading shops so they provide better equipment. Money can be used to buy that equipment or power-ups. Bosses are only accessible once players reach a certain experience level. Upon dying, players lose their money and guns.

== Development ==
Dust & Neon is the first game release from Swedish developer, David Marquardt Studios. Rogue Games released Dust & Neon for Windows and Switch on February 16, 2023. Netflix released it the same day for mobile devices running Android and iOS. They can play it for free as long as they maintain their subscription. Rogue Games released ports to the Xbox Series X/S and PlayStation 5 on August 17, 2023.

== Reception ==
Dust & Neon received mixed reviews on Metacritic. Fellow review aggregator OpenCritic assessed that the game received fair approval, being recommended by 38% of critics. Hardcore Gamer was initially impressed with the gameplay, especially the reloading mechanic. However, they said it becomes repetitive, does not have any story, and some of the enemies have poor AI. Gamezebo similarly criticized the repetitive gameplay but said it is fun and stylish, and they recommended it to fans of twin-stick shooters. Nintendo World Report felt the core game mechanics overcame Dust & Neon's repetition, and they said reloading made the boss fights more tense.
