= Earth Atlantis =

2017 video game

- Developer: Pixel Perfex
- Publisher: Headup Games
- Designer: Anucha Aribarg
- Engine: Unity
- Platforms: Nintendo Switch, PlayStation 4, Xbox One, iOS, Microsoft Windows, macOS, Linux
- Release: Nintendo Switch: WW: October 5, 2017; PlayStation 4, Xbox One: WW: June 5, 2018; iOS: WW: July 11, 2018
- Genres: Simulation, strategy
- Mode: Single-player

Earth Atlantis is a 2D side-scrolling shooter video game developed and published by Thai indie studio Pixel Perfex Studio for the Microsoft Windows, PlayStation 4, Nintendo Switch, and Xbox One. Earth Atlantis was released on October 5, 2017.

== Gameplay ==
In the game, the player controls a submarine as they explore the depths of a post-apocalyptic Earth. After the player chooses one of many underwater vehicles, they utilize their map in order to find their next objective and fight a variety of bosses along the way. The player can hop around while defeating smaller enemies in between.

== Reception ==
Reception

Aggregate score
Aggregator	Score
Metacritic	NS: 71/100; PS4: 49/100; XONE: 69/100 iOS: 78/100

Review scores
Publication	Score
Nintendo Life	8/10
TouchArcade	iOS: 4/5

According to review aggregator website Metacritic, Earth Atlantis received "mixed or average" reception with a score of 71 out of 100 for the Switch release. Nintendo Life gave the game an 8/10 rating.

Earth Atlantis won the "Excellence in Art" award – BIC Festival 2016 in Busan, South Korea and the "Vermilion Gate" award (Best in Show) during the 5th BitSummit 2017, Kyoto, Japan.

== Sequel ==
Pixel Perfex officially announced that they are currently working on a sequel and will be released sometime in the future.
