= Conglomerate 451 =

2020 video game

- Developer: RuneHeads
- Publisher: 1C Entertainment
- Engine: Unity
- Platforms: Linux; macOS; Windows; Nintendo Switch; PlayStation 4; Xbox One
- Release: NA: February 20, 2020; NA: June 3, 2021 (consoles)
- Genre: Dungeon crawl
- Mode: Single-player

Conglomerate 451 is a dungeon crawl video game developed by RuneHeads and published in 2020 by 1C Entertainment. Players fight corrupt corporations that control a cyberpunk city.

== Gameplay ==
The player controls a team of cloned soldiers sent to free a cyberpunk city from corrupt corporations. It is a first-person party-based dungeon crawler with turn-based combat. The world is procedurally generated and uses movement on a 2D grid. New clones can be created, and, like in traditional role-playing video games, these characters can be customized and gain new skills over time. Characters can suffer permanent injuries and become unplayable when killed. After completing missions, the player can research new technologies to give their clones special abilities. Each mission takes one week, and the game ends after 75 weeks. An alternative game mode allows players to continue running missions indefinitely without interference by the story.

== Development ==
Conglomerate 451 was developed by Milan-based studio RuneHeads. It entered early access on May 23, 2019, and was released on February 20, 2020. It was ported to the Nintendo Switch, PlayStation 4, and Xbox One in June 2021 under the name Conglomerate 451: Overloaded, published by 34BigThings.

== Reception ==
The Windows version of Conglomerate 451 received "mixed or average" reviews on the review aggregation website Metacritic. Fellow review aggregator OpenCritic assessed that the game received weak approval, being recommended by only 29% of critics. Nic Reuben of Rock Paper Shotgun enjoyed the game's character customization and the wide variety of tactical options in combat. However, he felt it lacked enough challenge to warrant this level of detail, and he criticized the game's cyberpunk setting as underused and shallow. Describing the game's setting as "forgettable", Alex Fuller wrote in RPGamer, "Conglomerate 451 has a solid gameplay base, but that's really all there is to it". In his review for the Arkansas Democrat-Gazette, Jason Bennett recommended the game to fans of traditional fantasy role-playing games like Legend of Grimrock. Bennett said the game uses the same mechanics with a cyberpunk theme.
