= Crime O'Clock =

- Developer: Bad Seed
- Publisher: Just For Games
- Engine: Unity
- Platforms: macOS; Nintendo Switch; Windows
- Release: WW: June 30, 2023
- Genre: Hidden object
- Mode: Single-player

Crime O'Clock is a 2023 hidden object video game developed by Bad Seed and published by Just For Games. Players control a time traveler who searches hand-drawn scenes for clues to stop crimes that have not yet been committed.

== Gameplay ==
Players attempt to maintain the timeline by stopping crimes that should not happen. This is done by finding hidden objects in hand-drawn, black and white levels. Each level exists in multiple versions, called "ticks", which represents a different point in time. The scene in the ticks are somewhat different from each other, such as a crowd moving further along a street. Using clues, players complete a minigame to discover who the criminal is on each level. An AI assistant helps players manage moving between levels and ticks. Players can request in-game hints, zoom in to see artwork in more detail, and highlight characters to track their movements across ticks.

== Development ==
Developer Bad Seed is based in Milan, Italy. Just For Games released Crime O'Clock on macOS, Windows, and Nintendo Switch on June 30, 2023.

== Reception ==
On Metacritic, Crime O'Clock received positive reviews for macOS and Windows and mixed reviews on the Switch. Siliconera said it is "a novel take" and "generally a lot of fun", but they felt it can become repetitive when played for longer sessions. They also found the minigames "unnecessary". Shacknews called it "an enjoyable throwback" that has been updated to modern standards, which they said alleviates the frustration of hidden object games. Although Nintendo Life enjoyed the art, they found the gameplay repetitive and did not like the minigames. They recommended it to fans of hidden object games but said others would probably not like it. TouchArcade enjoyed the art and premise, but also felt it might disappoint players new to hidden object games.
