= Don't Die, Mr. Robot! =

2014 video game

- Game Logo
- Developer: Infinite State
- Publishers: Sony Interactive Entertainment; Infinite State (iOS); Digerati (Switch)
- Platforms: PlayStation Vita, PlayStation 4, iOS, Nintendo Switch
- Release: PlayStation Vita; 29 October 2014; Nintendo Switch; 3 May 2018
- Genre: Action game
- Mode: Single-player

Don't Die, Mr. Robot! is an action video game by independent British studio Infinite State Games. The game was released in 2014 for PlayStation Vita, and in 2016 for PlayStation 4 and iOS. A remixed version of the game was released in 2018 for Nintendo Switch titled as Don't Die, Mr. Robot! DX.

== Plot ==
The main character, Mr. Robot, likes to eat fruit, but when he eats it, it explodes. One day, robotic drones take over the electro-abyss, so Mr. Robot eats fruits to eliminate the enemies with the explosions.

== Gameplay ==
Players control Mr. Robot on the playfield, where varieties of enemies will spawn around the edges of the screen, each with different attack patterns. Mr. Robot himself is defenseless, although there is fruit on the playfield that will explode upon contact. If an enemy is within the blast radius, it will be killed, and each segment will drop a coin, which can be spent on power-ups, unlockable characters, and cosmetics. If another fruit is within the blast radius, it will also explode and start a multiplier. You can also earn points by getting close to enemies, to get a danger bonus.
