= Cake Bash =

2020 video game

- Developer: High Tea Frog
- Publisher: Coatsink
- Programmer: Clement Capart
- Artist: Laura Hutton
- Composer: dBXY
- Platforms: Windows; PlayStation 4; Xbox One; Stadia; Nintendo Switch
- Release: Windows, PS4, Xbox One, Stadia; October 15, 2020; Switch; November 19, 2020
- Genres: Fighting, party
- Modes: Single-player, multiplayer

Cake Bash is a 2020 party video game developed by High Tea Frog and published by Coatsink. The game was released for Microsoft Windows, PlayStation 4, Xbox One, and Google Stadia on October 15, 2020, later releasing on November 19 for the Nintendo Switch. In the game, players control cakes competing against each other in order to be chosen by a customer.

High Tea Frog is Gateshead-based indie studio that was founded by three former Ubisoft employees. Inspirations for Cake Bash include games such as Crash Bash, Power Stone, and Rayman Raving Rabbids. Cake Bash received generally favorable reviews from critics.

== Gameplay ==
The Campfire minigame, where players attempt to perfectly toast marshmallows.

Cake Bash is a party game where players control cakes competing against each other in order to be chosen by a customer. There are 13 different minigames in Cake Bash. Some minigames may involve the cakes fighting each other with melee weapons, while others may be focused on survival. Get Tasty, the main game mode, sees the cakes competing in a randomized selection of Bash games and minigames. Minigames that are played in Get Tasty are unlocked permanently. Before a minigame starts, the players can vote on where or what game they want to play next. Players who win rounds collect chocolate coins, which are used to buy toppings for their cake. Purchased toppings provide a score bonus. The cake with the most toppings at the end of a match wins. Players can unlock new skins, known as "flavors" for their cake. The game supports local and online multiplayer, allowing up to 4 players per session. Cake Bash can be played with bots, which can also be used to fill in empty spots.

== Development and release ==
Cake Bash was developed by High Tea Frog, an independent studio based in Gateshead. It was founded by three former Ubisoft employees. High Tea Frog developers Clement Capart and Laura Hutton listed games such as Crash Bash, Power Stone, Mario Party, and Rayman Raving Rabbids as inspirations for Cake Bash. Cake Bash was shown off by High Tea Frog at the 2019 Game Developers Conference. The developers were originally looking for a publisher at the event, but had recently signed a publishing deal with Coatsink.

Cake Bash was featured at BitSummit 7 in Kyoto, Japan. A playable demo of Cake Bash was featured at the Indie Megabooth of PAX West 2019. The demo was available for free during the Steam Game Festival: Summer Edition. Cake Bash was one of over 70 demos available for free during the Xbox Summer Game Fest. In September, the developers released a free demo for the Nintendo Switch. In October, the game's demo was made available for free again during the Steam Game Festival: Autumn Edition. The game was released for Microsoft Windows, PlayStation 4, Xbox One, and Google Stadia on October 15, 2020. Cake Bash was featured in Showcase E of IGN Japan's Indie Game Week 2020. Cake Bash was later released for Nintendo Switch on November 19.

== Reception ==
Reception

Aggregate scores
Aggregator	Score
Metacritic	PS4: 76/100 (Note: Score based on 13 reviews.); XONE: 82/100 (Note: Score based on 5 reviews.); NS: 75/100 (Note: Score based on 8 reviews.)
OpenCritic	61% recommend

Review scores
Publication	Score
Famitsu	7/10, 8/10, 7/10, 7/10
Gamezebo	4/5
Nintendo Life	8/10
Nintendo World Report	7/10
Push Square	6/10

Cake Bash received "generally favorable" reviews according to review aggregator Metacritic. Fellow review aggregator OpenCritic assessed that the game received strong approval, being recommended by 61% of critics. It received a score of 29 out of 40 from Famitsu, based on individual reviews of 7, 8, 7, and 7.

Maria Alexander from Gamezebo rated Cake Bash 4/5 stars, calling the game's presentation "endearing" and commended the variety of minigames. Alexander believed that the game was slightly overpriced, and felt that it wasn't enough for those playing solo. Stephen Tailby from Push Square liked the game's concept, presentation, mini games, and controls, but felt that the game's appeal didn't last long and thought that it was light on content. Nintendo World Report's Joshua Garrison praised the gameplay and visuals, but criticized the lack of crossplay and the lack of a single-player campaign. Nintendo Life's Stuart Gipp also praised the visuals, and called the performance "great", but felt that there wasn't enough minigames, and believed that the game's outcomes were random.
