= Epic Astro Story =

- Developer: Kairosoft
- Platforms: Android, iOS
- Release: NA: March 2, 2012
- Genre: Simulation
- Mode: Single player

Epic Astro Story is a simulation video game developed and published by Kairosoft for the Android and iOS operating systems. It was released in December, 2011 for Android and in April, 2012 for iOS. The player is tasked with managing and expanding a colony in a science fiction setting, while also exploring both their colony and other planets. The game has received mostly positive reviews from critics.

== Gameplay ==
Epic Astro Story has two main facets to its gameplay. The first is a city managing simulation, where the player is required to build up a colony and build its success. The second is a colony exploration component, which allows the player to look through caves, empty territory, and other planets for loot and land, and contains a battle system where the colony's explorers must fight aliens and monsters. As the teams of colonists leave to explore, their progress in different areas is tracked through a bar on the bottom of the screen, which allows the player to continue with other management issues while the explorers continue their work. All of the colonists have names that are a play on popular Star Trek characters.

== Reception ==
Reception

Aggregate score
Aggregator	Score
Metacritic	91/100

Review score
Publication	Score
TouchArcade	4.5/5

Epic Astro Story has received mostly positive reviews from critics, with the iOS version receiving a 91/100 from review aggregator website Metacritic. TouchArcade's Colette Bennett called the iOS version her favorite title of Kairosoft's release thus far, and felt that the battle system broke up the company's formula for past management simulation games. Pocket Gamer's Damien McFarren was impressed by the Android version's surprisingly "multifaceted gameplay", and praised its addictive formula. Gamezebo's Kevin Alexander, in his review of the Android version, felt that the game did a good job presenting a number of different factors in a fun and easy to manage way.
