= Flip Wars =

2017 party video game

- Developer: Over Fence
- Publishers: JP: Over Fence; WW: Nintendo
- Engine: Unity
- Platform: Nintendo Switch
- Release: JP: May 18, 2017; PAL: July 6, 2017; NA: August 10, 2017
- Genres: Action, tile-matching, party
- Modes: Single-player, Multiplayer

Flip Wars (Note: Known in Japan as Battle Sports Mekuru (Japanese: バトルスポーツ めく〜る, Hepburn: Batoru supōtsu mekuru)) is a 2017 party video game developed and published by Over Fence for the Nintendo Switch. It was released as a digital-only Nintendo eShop title in Japan by Over Fence and internationally by Nintendo. The game supports up to four players competitively in both local and online play sessions.

== Gameplay ==
The game is played with up to four players. One player can play against in-game CPU opponents, or against human opponents both via local play and online. Each player will have to choose one of four colored avatars. The object of the game is to flip panels on a board by Hip Drop, and depending on the mode the player who dominates before the timer runs out wins the game. There are multiple board maps, each with various environmental hazards and power-up items that pushes players to determine their strategy.

At launch, the game includes three modes: Panel Battle, Knock Out Battle and Life Battle. In Panel Battle, the players must dominate the board map with their colors, and whoever dominates most panels with their color wins. In Knock Out Battle, players who knock out their opponents the most wins. Knocking out opponents during Panel Battle is also possible, although it simply hiders the opponents' progress rather than taking opponents out of the play field or scoring the player. Life Battle is an elimination mode: Players who get knocked out three times lose, and the last player standing wins.

== Development ==
Japanese developer Over Fence originally revealed the game during Nintendo's Nindie Showcase press event on February 28, 2017 under its original working title Project Mekuru. The term mekuru is a reference to "flipping" in Japanese. In addition to its four-player panel-flipping gameplay mechanic, it was confirmed the game is developed in Unity, and it originally intended to have Mii character support, although this has been dropped in the final game. Nintendo did not publicly announce the game until the April 2017 Nintendo Direct presentation, again under its working title, and slated it for a summer 2017 release.

Nothing was heard from the game until its Japanese release in May 2017, and later just before its initial western release in Europe and Australia in July 2017, under its finalized English title Flip Wars.

The game was a commercial failure, which led to Over Fence filing for bankruptcy in March 2018; their last project had been a race horse investment game for DMM.com.

== Reception ==
Reception

Aggregate scores
Aggregator	Score
Metacritic	53/100 (Note: Score based on 25 reviews)
OpenCritic	6% recommend (Note: Score based on 18 reviews)

Review score
Publication	Score
Nintendo Life	6/10

Flip Wars received "mixed or average" reviews according to review aggregator Metacritic, with the game being recommended by 6% of critics according to OpenCritic. Nintendo Life gave the title a 6/10, praising the multiplayer gameplay, but criticizing the lack of modes and online connection issues, despite the fact the game will be receiving updates over time.
