= Gonner =

2016 video game

- Logo
- Developer: Art in Heart
- Publisher: Raw Fury
- Engine: Unity
- Platforms: Windows, macOS, Linux, Nintendo Switch, PlayStation 4, Xbox One
- Release: Windows, macOS, Linux: WW: October 12, 2016; Nintendo Switch: WW: June 29, 2017; PlayStation 4: WW: May 15, 2018; Xbox One: WW: September 14, 2018
- Genre: Roguelike
- Mode: Single-player

Gonner (stylized as GoNNER) is a roguelike video game developed by Art in Heart and published by Raw Fury. It was released on October 12, 2016 for Microsoft Windows, macOS and Linux. A Nintendo Switch version of the game was scheduled for release on June 8, 2017, but was delayed to June 29, 2017. The game has been described as a "shooter" version of Spelunky.

A sequel was announced during the Guerrilla Collective livestream event, called Gonner 2 and was released on 22 October 2020.

== Gameplay ==
The rogue-like features of the game introduce different heads and limbs that can be unlocked over multiple playthroughs and in game that act as a passive item, causing bullets to be larger, for faster shooting and many other abilities. There are four worlds in Gonner and players move on to the next one by killing the current world's end boss.

== Release ==
GoNNER was shown at PAX East 2016. It was released on October 12, 2016 on Steam and GOG.com, and was released on the Humble Store on October 13.

== Reception ==
Reception

Aggregate score
Aggregator	Score
Metacritic	(NS) 79/100 (PC) 81/100

Review scores
Publication	Score
Destructoid	9.5/10
Nintendo Life	8/10
Nintendo World Report	8/10
PC Gamer (US)	71/100
Hardcore Gamer	3.5/5

GoNNER received positive reviews from reviewers. On Metacritic, the game has a score of 79/100 for the Nintendo Switch version based on 14 reviews, while the PC version has a score of 81/100 based on 5 reviews.

Adam Smith of Rock, Paper, Shotgun thought the game always felt good, and said that playing the game was "an absolute delight". Preston Dozsa of Hooked Gamers awarded the game a rating of 8.5/10 and believed GoNNER was not a game for everyone due to the frequency of deaths. He continued on to say that "for those who persevere, GoNNER is a rewarding, challenging experience that is a blast to play".

== See also ==
- Strafe
- Spelunky
