= Cyber Citizen Shockman =

1989 video game

- Developer: Winds
- Publishers: Masaya Games; NCS Corporation; Ratalaika Games (NS, PS4/5, XBO, XSX)
- Platforms: PC Engine; Nintendo Switch; PlayStation 4; PlayStation 5; Xbox One; Xbox Series X/S
- Release: PC Engine: JP: March 18, 1989; Nintendo Switch, PlayStation 4/5, Xbox One, Xbox Series X/S: WW: May 18, 2023
- Genre: Platform
- Modes: Single-player, multiplayer

Cyber Citizen Shockman (改造町人シュビビンマン, Kaizō Chōjin Shubibinman) (also known as Overhauled Man) is a 1989 video game published by Masaya and NCS. It was released exclusively for the PC Engine in Japan. It was released for the first time outside Japan in 2023 by Ratalaika Games. A sequel, Cyber Citizen Shockman 2: A New Menace, was released in 1991.

== Plot ==
Tasuke and Kyapiko are two school children who are turned into androids called Shockmen by a mad scientist known only as Doc. They are tasked to stop the evil forces of Dark Skull, Doc's first creation. Their objective is to reclaim control of the city and rescue hostages from the Skull Force.

== Gameplay ==
The player has destroyed an enemy.

Cyber Citizen Shockman is a side-scrolling platform game. The game features cooperative gameplay for two players. The player can attack enemies using a sword and gather gold from them. At the end of the level, there is a boss enemy, and once defeated, a freed hostage will provide a reward in the form of gold or a healing item. The collected gold can be used to buy upgrades from Doc, which include enhancing weapons, increasing maximum health, or obtaining a powerful beam weapon.

== Release ==
The game was released originally in Japan on March 18, 1989 for the PC Engine. It was developed by Winds, an outsourcing company, and published by Masaya and NCS. It was re-released on the Wii Virtual Console in Japan on March 27, 2007. It was re-released for the PlayStation 3 and PlayStation Portable on January 19, 2011. It was released for Windows on the Project EGG distribution service on November 18, 2014. The game was re-released on the Wii U Virtual Console in Japan on December 16, 2015. Ratalaika Games re-released the game on May 18, 2023 for the Nintendo Switch, PlayStation 4 and 5, Xbox One, and Xbox Series X/S.

== Reception ==
Contemporary reception

Review scores
Publication	Score
Famitsu	21/40
The Games Machine (UK)	67%
Complete Guide to Consoles	51%
Micro News	4/5

Retrospective reception

Aggregate score
Aggregator	Score
Metacritic	54/100

Review scores
Publication	Score
Destructoid	5/10
Hardcore Gamer	4/5
Nintendo Life	5/10
TouchArcade	3/5
Retronauts	2/5

=== Contemporary ===
The Games Machine wrote: "There's nothing actually wrong with Overhauled Man, it's just that this sort of thing has been done to death on consoles." Micro News called it a captivating and comprehensive platform game with a few original touches. Although it was still said to be mainly for die-hard fans of the genre. Complete Guide to Consoles noted the graphics and sound as "feeble", and the gameplay unoriginal and boring.

=== Retrospective ===
Destructoid noted that "Poor hit detection and control completely overshadow any of its inventive qualities." Hardcore Gamer concluded: "As a whole, Cyber Citizen Shockman is an excellent side-scrolling platformer that has a few signs of its age, but the core gameplay is timeless." TouchArcade wrote: "Your character’s movement is a bit laggy, the level designs are quite uninspired, and the hit detection is very imprecise." Retronauts liked the game's graphics and music but called the level design "amateurish" and the game overall "just not very fun". Nintendo Life noted it as the worst game in the series. Hardcore Gaming 101 said the game "looks pretty sweet", noted the music as "catchy" but called the jump controls "horrible".
