= CounterAttack: Uprising =

2020 video game

- Steam cover art
- Developer: Relative Games
- Publisher: Relative Software Ltd.
- Engine: Unity
- Platforms: Windows, Linux, macOS, Switch, Xbox One
- Release: Windows; 11 Mar, 2019; Xbox One; November 4, 2022; Switch; September 28, 2023
- Genre: Scrolling shooter
- Modes: Single-player, multiplayer

CounterAttack: Uprising is a horizontal scrolling shooter video game developed and published by Canadian studio Relative Software Ltd. It was released on 11 March 2019 on Steam for Windows, Linux, and macOS, on 4 November 2022 for Xbox One and on 28 September 2023 for Nintendo Switch.

== Gameplay ==
Gameplay screenshot

CounterAttack: Uprising is a 3D side-scrolling shoot 'em up game in which the player's task is to reach the end of the level. Between levels, players are given the option to equip upgrades called attachments for their ship. These upgrades can vary from speed boosts to weapon conversions. They can also affect the visual profile of the ship. As of 2 February there are over 650 attachments.

As the game progresses, more weapons and other upgrades are made available. The fighter the player starts with only has slots for 3 weapons and 3 attachments; however, more slots are unlocked as the game progresses. There is a large variety of weapons, ranging from plasma cannons to lightning guns to singularity cannons. While weapons can be equipped between levels, they are upgraded during levels. This may enhance power, projectile velocity, rate of fire, or the nature of the attack itself.

The player's ship builds up heat while firing, indicated by a cloud of smoke that emits from their ship. This heat dissipates when firing ceases. While overheating won't prevent the player from firing their weapons, they will fire more slowly. Specials, also known as bombs, are not affected by heat. Bombs use a pickup called "quantium", which is displayed at the top left of the interface as a yellow energy orb.

Main features are "weapon and ability customization, level and campaign editors, local 4-player co-op, and cross-platform online play for up to 8 players across Nintendo Switch, Xbox One, Epic, and Steam (Windows/Linux/Mac)."

== Release ==
The game was part of Steam's Greenlight program and was greenlit on 25 February 2016. It left early access on 11 March 2019. It was released on Xbox One on 4 November 2022 and Nintendo Switch eShop on 28 September 2023.

== Reception ==
Jordam Rudek from NintendoWorldReport gave the game a 7.5/10 and wrote "Gradius-like upgrades and lots of unlockable content elevate this 'shump."
