= Good Pizza, Great Pizza =

2014 restaurant management video game

- App icon
- Developer: TapBlaze
- Publisher: TapBlaze (Note: Nintendo Switch version published by PM Studios.)
- Engine: cocos2d
- Platforms: iOS; Android; Fire OS; Nintendo Switch; macOS; Windows
- Release: December 2, 2014: iOS; December 2, 2014; Android; February 6, 2015; Fire OS; June 23, 2016; Nintendo Switch; September 3, 2020; macOS, Windows; January 6, 2023
- Genre: Management
- Mode: Single-player

Good Pizza, Great Pizza is a restaurant management video game developed by TapBlaze for iOS, Android, Fire OS, Nintendo Switch, macOS, and Windows. The player focuses on taking orders from customers and cooking pizzas to be the best Ovenist on the street.

== Gameplay ==
Players take on the role of an Ovenist, a pizza maker who runs a pizza shop. The goal is to fulfill customer orders and compete with a rival pizza shop across the street. As customers arrive with unique orders and personalities, the player must balance speed and accuracy in following the pizza-making process, which includes making dough, selecting a sauce, adding toppings, baking, slicing, boxing, and delivering the pizza to the customer at the counter. The main rival is Alicante who pops in the store as the player progresses through the story.

While players spend money on ingredients, they also make a profit, which can be used to purchase upgrades such as new ingredients, better equipment, or necessary repairs. Players must learn how to balance using a good amount of ingredients and choosing to use less in order to save money. Some ingredients can be purchased, while others are obtained by growing plants that require daily watering to ensure a steady supply. Toppings are not labeled in the kitchen, so as more ingredients are purchased and the options fill up the screen, players must remember the specific toppings based on sight. The game begins to rely more on memory and motor skills as players must scan for what they need.

There are over 100 unique customers in the game and each has a different personality and look. As more customers order, the game's story develops. There are two recognizable, reoccurring homeless customers and stop in to ask you for free food. If the player chooses to give them help, they will return and assist the shop in different ways. Other customers may come in with money, but it may not be enough to cover the whole order. The player needs to decide whether to accept the order or not.

In the game some customers place straight-forward orders, while others aren't so clear and make the process complicated. There are many ways that the orders will be personalized. This includes the right amount of toppings, cheese, and sauce, and any amount of slices customers may want. Some customers may even ask for nothing at all. Thousands of combinations can be made. It is up to the player to navigate the tricky ordering process and learn what the customer wants. If a customer is given the wrong order, players must issue a refund. If players are confused by what the customer is asking for, they can ask the customer once for clarification and also refer to the order receipt. Happy customers will leave tips.

As players progress through Good Pizza, Great Pizza, they learn about the unique world within it. There is an in-game news network called Pizza News Network (PNN) that discusses all pizza-related news. It is a spoof of CNN.

== Development ==
Anthony Lai is the CEO of app developer company TapBlaze. In 2012, he began publishing simple games on the App Store. Hoping to build some more complicated games that would attract audiences for the long term, Lai hired a team. After deciding to make a food-based game, Lai settled on pizza being the star. The lead designer says much of the character design and gameplay was based on his many years of experience when he worked at Costco's pizza kitchen. Good Pizza, Great Pizza first became available on the App Store in 2014. While Lai says it had a strong player base at first, the game did not originally have a good retention rate.

The game was briefly abandoned until 2016 when Lai attended the Game Developers Conference. An editor encouraged him to polish up the game's design, user interface, and monetization strategies, and Lai began to realize the game had more potential. Lai developed a small team and made the suggested adjustments. The Los Angeles-based team says after making these changes, Good Pizza, Great Pizza's audience jumped from 1,000 daily active users to 30,000 in four months.

== Release ==
Good Pizza, Great Pizza was initially released for iOS on December 2, 2014, Android devices on February 6, 2015, and for Amazon devices via Fire OS on June 23, 2016. Published by PM Studios, a port for Nintendo Switch was released on September 3, 2020. The game entered early access for macOS and Windows via Steam in 2018 and was fully released on January 6, 2023.

In 2020, TapBlaze announced the Nintendo Switch release at the New Game+ Expo. A limited number of physical editions were also released, including a steelbook and a plush.

On February 27, 2025, Good Coffee, Great Coffee, a spin-off game for iOS and Android devices was released. It has a similar gameplay and aesthetics, but it is placed in a coffeehouse instead of a pizzeria. There is also another spoof of CNN called Coffee News Station (CNS).

== Reception ==
Good Pizza, Great Pizza has received generally favorable reviews from both critics and players. AppAdvice praised the game for its "eccentric and full of personality" art style, intuitive controls, and engaging challenge, noting that it effectively simulates the experience of running a pizzeria. On Metacritic, the iOS version has a user score of 7.4 out of 10, based on 16 user ratings, indicating mixed or average reviews.

== Awards ==
Good Pizza, Great Pizza received an honorable mention at the MENA Games Industry Awards for 'Best Arabic Localization' at the Dubai GameExpo Summit 2024.

Good Pizza, Great Pizza received the NYX Game Awards 2024 Gold Winner in the 'PC Game - Best Visual Art' and 'PC Game - Best Character Design' categories.
