= Clive 'N' Wrench =

2023 video game

- Developer: Dinosaur Bytes Studio
- Publisher: Numskull Games
- Director: Rob Wass
- Programmers: Paul Hamilton; Brandon Mitchell; Evan Pipta; Michael Saunders
- Writer: Rob Wass
- Composer: Kevin Wass
- Platforms: Nintendo Switch; PlayStation 4; PlayStation 5; Windows
- Release: EU: February 24, 2023; NA: February 28, 2023; JP: March 29, 2023
- Genre: Platformer
- Mode: Single-player

Clive 'N' Wrench is a 2023 3D platformer video game developed by Dinosaur Bytes Studio and published by Numskull Games for the Nintendo Switch, PlayStation 4, PlayStation 5 and Steam.

== Gameplay ==
The game was modeled after 3D platformers from the 1990s and early 2000s.

Players control a brown rabbit named Clive, accompanied by a monkey named Wrench. Together, they travel through different time periods, including Ancient Egypt and Victorian London, collecting ancient stones in order to fix the time rifts the evil Dr. Daucus has created.

== Development ==
The game began development in early 2011. Rob Wass, also known as Dinosaur Bytes, was the lead programmer. Music was composed by Wyshwood Studio and art design was done by Luigi Lucarelli. Voice actors who worked in the game include Blake "ShadyVox" Swift.

== Release ==
The game released in early 2023.
