= Dude, Stop =

2018 Latvian video game

- Developer: Team Halfbeard
- Publisher: HeroCraft PC
- Engine: Unity
- Platforms: Microsoft Windows; macOS; Linux; Nintendo Switch
- Release: June 1, 2018
- Genres: Puzzle, Comedy
- Mode: Single-player

Dude, Stop is a comedy puzzle video game developed and published by Team Halfbeard. It was released on June 1, 2018, for Microsoft Windows, Nintendo Switch, macOS, and Linux via Steam. Each puzzle has a clearly defined correct solution, and the player is free to complete it in the conventional manner. However, the game's central mechanic encourages players to discover and exploit entirely incorrect solutions that generate unique outcomes, hidden achievements, and escalating reactions from the game's narrator. The game received generally positive reviews from critics, who noted its similarities to the series WarioWare.

== Gameplay ==
The game is notable for its meta-narrative conceit: rather than rewarding players for solving puzzles correctly, it actively encourages—and rewards—deliberate failure, misbehaviour, and subversion of its own rules. The game features a fictional narrator who reacts to the player's actions in real time, providing commentary that escalates in frustration as the player continues to ignore instructions. In addition, Dude, Stop features achievements for such behaviour.

== Development ==
Dude, Stop was developed by Team Halfbeard, a Latvian independent studio. The studio has cited frustration with games that over-explain their mechanics and over-reward compliance as a partial inspiration for the project's design philosophy. The narrator character was developed specifically to serve as a vehicle for that commentary—a figure of conventional game-design authority that the player is implicitly invited to undermine.

The game was released via Steam Early Access before receiving its full release in 2018. Post-launch updates added additional puzzles and expanded the narrator's dialogue pool in response to player feedback.

== Reception ==
Dude, Stop received generally positive reviews following its release. Although 4P remarked that it was unremarkable technically and mechanically, it was stated that its concept and ideas are so exceptional that they were willing to overlook its flaws. PC Guru liked it, but found the narrator too angry too early, although Maniac.de found the narrator hilarious. Dude, Stop illicited multiple comparisons to WarioWare. It was nominated at the Central & Eastern European Game Awards for "Неизвестный шедевр" (lit. Unknown masterpiece) and Most Creative by IndieDB at the 2018 Indie of the Year Awards.
