= Everdream Valley =

- Developer: Mooneaters
- Publisher: Untold Tales
- Engine: Unity
- Platforms: Windows; PlayStation 4; PlayStation 5; Nintendo Switch; Xbox One; Xbox Series X/S
- Release: Windows, PS4, PS5; May 30, 2023; Nintendo Switch; June 23, 2023; Xbox One, Xbox Series X/S; December 15, 2023
- Genre: Simulation
- Mode: Single-player

Everdream Valley is a 2023 simulation video game developed by Polish studio Mooneaters and published by Untold Tales.

== Gameplay ==
Players control a child who must save their grandparents' farm, which has fallen into disrepair. Their grandparents help players out with tutorials on how to run the farm and give them free equipment. While dreaming, players experience life on the farm as an animal and play minigames, such taking the role of a livestock guardian dog who has to scare off wolves. Quests can be received from players' grandparents, in dreams from the animals, and occasionally from a human merchant.

== Development ==
Untold Tales published it for Windows, PlayStation 4, and PlayStation 5 on May 30, 2023. A version for Nintendo Switch followed on June 23, 2023. Versions for Xbox One and Xbox Series X/S were made available on December 15, 2023.

== Reception ==
Everdream Valley received "mixed or average" reviews, according to the review aggregation website Metacritic. Fellow review aggregator OpenCritic assessed that the game received weak approval, being recommended by 36% of critics. GamesRadar called it "the perfect cute tonic for an evening after a long day of work". Digitally Downloaded wrote that Everdream Valley "feels rushed or incomplete" and fails to live up to its potential because of software bugs, counterintuitive controls, and what they felt was a focus on quantity over quality. Nintendo Life said it will likely not appeal to fans of farm life sims, but animal lovers may enjoy it. TouchArcade said too much of its gameplay feels "feel half-baked or not properly thought-out", and they recommended avoiding the Switch version until its bugs are fixed.
