= Death of a Wish =

- Steam header art
- Developer: Melessthanthree
- Publisher: Syndicate Atomic
- Platforms: Windows, Nintendo Switch
- Release: 11 March 2024
- Genre: Action role-playing
- Mode: Single-player

Death of a Wish is a 2024 video game developed by Melessthanthree, the pseudonym of independent developer Colin Horgan, and published by Syndicate Atomic. The game expands upon the setting of Horgan's previous title, Lucah: Born of a Dream, and its antagonist Christian, introduced in a DLC release The Descent. Upon release, Death of a Wish received praise by critics for its abstract visual presentation, the pace of combat, and its narrative themes relating to revenge and self-actualisation.

== Gameplay ==
Death of a Wish is an action game in which the player character, Christian, vows revenge on the corrupt cult that inhabits the Sanctum led by its figureheads, the Father, the Sister, the Cardinal and the Priest. Players battle enemies through a moveset that includes a mixture of light and heavy hack and slash moves that can be chained to break enemy defenses, a dodge roll, sprint, parry and teleport. The player also has a hovering Familiar that performs ranged attacks. Players can further customize their weapons and combat styles, named Arias, throughout the game to acquire new primary and secondary attacks, and collect Prayer Cards that provide additional abilities. In contrast to previous games by Horgan, Death of a Wish does not have a stamina system or cooldown for the use of these abilities, instead featuring enemies with greater use of pursuit, gap-closing and projectile attacks to counter the abilities of the player. The game features a corruption meter, which is a percentage-based statistic that increases each time the player takes damage or dies and decreases when the player performs well in combat encounters. If the meter increases over 100%, the game will trigger a bad ending.

== Development ==
Death of a Wish was developed by Melessthanthree, the pseudonym of independent developer Colin Horgan. The game originated as a DLC for the developer's preceding title, Lucah: Born of a Dream. Seeking to design a "richer action experience" compared to its predecessor, Horgan reworked the combat design and moveset for Death of a Wish, focusing on increased challenge and a more sophisticated enemy and encounter design. These were intended to contribute to an increased pace and aggression to reflect the game's revenge narrative and depiction of Christian, a character "hurt by an oppressive culture that raised him on self-hatred and self-harm (who) seeks freedom through revenge". Horgan stated that the tone and aesthetics of the game were inspired by working with independent developer Heather Flowers and the "angry and righteous" tone of their previous title, Extreme Meatpunks Forever, and the game Sekiro: Shadows Die Twice. Horgan also envisaged Christian as an "outlet for a lot of feelings" for "like-minded people" in the context of political developments in the United States, particularly in relation to debates around transgender and pro-choice rights. The game was released as a demo on 26 October 2023 and previewed at the February 2024 Steam Next Fest. The game was released for PC and the Switch on 11 March 2024.

== Reception ==
Reception

Aggregate score
Aggregator	Score
Metacritic	77/100

Death of a Wish received "generally favorable" reviews from critics, according to the review aggregation website Metacritic.

Edwin Evans-Thirlwell of Rock Paper Shotgun praised the game's "gorgeous" visual presentation in its "powerfully abstract" design and "spectacle" of battle, also commending the game's "crisper work of storytelling" compared to its predecessor. He cited the "breathless and stark" tone core and theme of conflict as "redemptive self-expression", earlier for Eurogamer characterising the narrative as continuing the creators "explorations of religious or filial guilt and the journey towards queer self-acceptance". Also writing for Rock Paper Shotgun, Alice O'Connor highlighted the game's visual style as "wildly over the top" and its explorations of angst as "perfect", comparing the game to Bloodborne. Ben Sledge of TheGamer found the game to be memorable, stating that each of the game's elements formed "one of the most engaging, evocative games I've played in a long time", discussing the game's "unique art style, evocative writing, and invigorating combat". In an impression of the game, Jakob Barnes of PCGamesN highlighted its "striking" and "beautifully unique" visual style, "unsettling narrative, formidable foes, and gloomy tone", comparing the game to Diablo and Vampire Survivors. Shaun Prescott of PC Gamer described the game as "gorgeously bleak", praising the "over-the-top attack animations" as contributing to the game's "oppressive atmosphere". Charlie Kelly of Checkpoint Gaming described the game as a "must-play" title, citing its "unbelievably unique and striking" visual design, diverse combat system and themes around Catholic guilt and queer identity.
