= Graceful Explosion Machine =

2017 video game

- Developer: Vertex Pop
- Publisher: Vertex Pop
- Composer: Robby Duguay
- Platforms: Windows, Switch, PlayStation 4
- Release: Switch: WW: April 6, 2017; PS4, Windows: WW: August 8, 2017
- Genre: Scrolling shooter
- Mode: Single-player

Graceful Explosion Machine is a horizontally scrolling shooter developed by Vertex Pop. It was released in North America and Europe for the Nintendo Switch on April 6, 2017, then for Microsoft Windows and PlayStation 4 on August 8, 2017 in the North American and North European regions. The game has received positive reviews from critics.

== Reception ==
According to Metacritic, the Switch version received a 77/100 from 19 critics indicating "generally favorable reviews". Mitch Vogel of Nintendo Life gave the game a 9/10, calling it "an arcade shooter with a lot of style and a surprising amount of substance". He praised the weapons in the game, noting how each individual weapon's strengths and weaknesses encourage the player to use their full arsenal. He also noted the game's replay value and found it "incredibly satisfying" to return to previous levels to get a high score.

Writing for IGN, Jose Otero liked how each enemy had their own attack patterns which gave them "loads of personality" despite being composed of "basic shapes". He also praised how "stringing together a killer run" provides a "satisfying adreneline rush". He ultimately gave the game an 8.0/10.

A more negative review came from GamesRadar's David Roberts who gave the game a 3/5. He praised the game's "colorful, candy colored" graphics and the audio cues that "let you know when to lay off the blaster or grab more gems" but lamented that "once you've played the first few stages you've seen pretty much everything it has to offer" and that "each stage takes way to long to complete" attributing the latter to five-minute stages that, for the majority of the time, are spent on "mindless fodder" in between the "larger and more interesting enemies. Ultimately, he called Graceful Explosion Machine a "decent enough distraction" that "allows you to turn your brain off" when the player has a few minutes to kill.
