= List of Nintendo Switch games (B) =

This is part of the list of Nintendo Switch games.

== List ==
There are currently 4133 games across List of Nintendo Switch games (0–9), List of Nintendo Switch games (A–Am), List of Nintendo Switch games (An–Az), this page (B), List of Nintendo Switch games (C–G), List of Nintendo Switch games (H–P), and List of Nintendo Switch games (Q–Z).

List of Nintendo Switch games
| Title | Developer(s) | Publisher(s) | Release date | Ref. |
|---|---|---|---|---|
| B.Ark | TicToc Games | TicToc Games | July 29, 2021 | |
| B-Project Ryūsei*Fantasia | Mages | Mages | September 30, 2021 | |
| Baba Is You | Hempuli | Hempuli | March 13, 2019 | |
| Babol the Walking Box | Gamecom Team | Gamecom Team | TBA | |
| Baby Puzzle: First Learning Shapes for Toddlers | winterworks | winterworks | January 11, 2021 | |
| Baby Shark: Sing & Swim Party | Recotechnology S.L. | Outright Games | September 15, 2023 | |
| Back in 1995 | Ratalaika Games | Ratalaika Games | May 23, 2019 | |
| Back to Bed | 2Awesome Studio | 2Awesome Studio | April 11, 2019 | |
| Backbone | EggNut | Raw Fury | June 8, 2020 | |
| Backpack Hero | Jaspel | Jaspel, IndieArk, Different Tales | November 14, 2023 | |
| Backworlds | Logic Ember Limited | Skymap Games | May 20, 2021 | |
| Bacon Man: An Adventure | Skymap Games | Skymap Games | September 29, 2020 | |
| Bad Dream: Coma | Desert Fox | Forever Entertainment | January 24, 2019 | |
| Bad Dream: Fever | Forever Entertainment | Forever Entertainment | March 14, 2019 | |
| Bad North | Plausible Concept | Raw Fury | August 20, 2018 | |
| Bada Space Station | Terahard Studios | Terahard Studios | TBA | |
| Badland: Game of the Year Edition | Frogmind | QubicGames | August 6, 2021 | |
| BAFL: Brakes Are for Losers | Oudidon | Playdius Entertainment | April 19, 2018 | |
| Bai Qu: Hundreds of Melodies | Magenta Factory | Ratalaika Games | July 9, 2021 | |
| Baila Latino | My World | My World | December 3, 2020 | |
| Bake 'N Switch | Streamline Games | Streamline Games | September 10, 2020 | |
| Bakery Master | Piotr Skalski | Piotr Skalski | February 23, 2021 | |
| Bakugan: Champions of Vestroia | WayForward | Warner Bros. Interactive Entertainment | November 3, 2020 | |
| Bakumatsu Renka Shinsengumi | VRIDGE | D3 Publisher | June 17, 2021 | |
| Bakutsuri Hunters | Bandai Namco Studios | Bandai Namco Entertainment | December 7, 2019 | |
| Balan Wonderworld | Arzest | Square Enix | March 26, 2021 | |
| Balance Blox | EntwicklerX | EntwicklerX | January 24, 2019 | |
| Balancelot | Jestercraft, AnvilBird Interactive | Ratalaika Games | January 22, 2021 | |
| Balatro | LocalThunk | Playstack | February 20, 2024 | |
| Baldo | Naps Team | Naps Team | August 26, 2021 | |
| Baldur's Gate: Dark Alliance | Black Isle Studios | Wizards of the Coast | May 20, 2021 | |
| Baldur's Gate: Dark Alliance II | Square One | Interplay Entertainment | July 20, 2022 | |
| Baldur's Gate: Enhanced Edition | Beamdog | Skybound Games | October 15, 2019 | |
| Baldur's Gate II: Enhanced Edition | Beamdog | Skybound Games | October 15, 2019 | |
| Ball Attraction | Rising Win Tech | Rising Win Tech | September 19, 2019 | |
| Ball Physics Draw Puzzles | Benjamin Kistler | Kistler Benjamin | September 10, 2021 | |
| Ball Physics Draw Puzzles 2 | Benjamin Kistler | Kistler Benjamin | October 21, 2021 | |
| Ball x Pit | Kenny Sun | Devolver | October 15, 2025 | |
| Balloon Girl | Nerdvision Games | Nerdvision Games | March 30, 2021 | |
| Balloon Pop for Toddlers & Kids: Learn Numbers, Letters, Colors & Animals | Winterworks | JP: Rainy Frog; WW: Winterworks | July 1, 2020 | |
| Balloon Pop: Learning Letters, Numbers, Colors, Game for Kids | McPeppergames | McPeppergames | October 7, 2021 | |
| BallzOut | 4MB Interactive | 4MB Interactive | August 31, 2020 | |
| Bamerang | Lululu Entertainment | Lululu Entertainment | April 22, 2021 | |
| Banana Treasures Island | Max Interactive Studio | Max Interactive Studio | October 26, 2020 | |
| Bandle Tale: A League of Legends Story | Lazy Bear Games | Riot Forge | February 21, 2024 | |
| BanG Dream! Girls Band Party! | Craft Egg | Bushiroad | September 16, 2021 | |
| Banner of the Maid | Azure Flame Studio | CE-Asia | August 12, 2020 | |
| The Banner Saga | Stoic Studio | Versus Evil | May 17, 2018 | |
| The Banner Saga 2 | Stoic Studio | Versus Evil | June 7, 2018 | |
| The Banner Saga 3 | Stoic Studio | Versus Evil | July 26, 2018 | |
| Banners of Ruin | MonteBearo | Goblinz Studio | July 29, 2021 | |
| Baobabs Mausoleum Ep.1: Ovnifagos Don't Eat Flamingos | Celery Emblem | Zerouno Games | May 24, 2018 | |
| Baobabs Mausoleum Ep. 2: 1313 Barnabas Dead End Drive | Celery Emblem | Zerouno Games | June 27, 2019 | |
| Baobabs Mausoleum Ep. 3: Un Pato en Muertoburgo | Celery Emblem | Zerouno Games | November 21, 2019 | |
| Barbarous: Tavern of Emyr | SQRT3 | QubicGames | December 25, 2019 | |
| Barbearian | Kimmo Factor | Kimmo Factor | October 29, 2020 | |
| Barbero | Forever Entertainment | Forever Entertainment | October 14, 2021 | |
| Barbie Dreamhouse Adventures | Budge Studios | Budge Studios | October 27, 2023 | |
| Barbie Project Friendship | Xaloc Studios, Casual Brothers Games | Outright Games | October 25, 2024 | |
| Bard's Gold | Pixel Lantern | Pixel Lantern | March 5, 2019 | |
| The Bard's Tale ARPG: Remastered and Resnarkled | InXile Entertainment | InXile Entertainment | June 17, 2020 | |
| Bargain Hunter | Silver Cow Studio | Silver Cow Studio | March 15, 2019 | |
| Baron: Fur Is Gonna Fly | Dogmelon Games | Dogmelon Games | March 4, 2020 | |
| Baroque | Sting Entertainment | Sting Entertainment | November 12, 2020 | |
| Barrage Fantasia | Hanaji Games | Hanaji Games | March 25, 2021 | |
| Barricadez ReVisited | FlyPenguin | FlyPenguin | September 30, 2021 | |
| Barrier X | HypeTrain Digital | HypeTrain Digital | September 3, 2019 | |
| Barry Bradford's Putt Panic Party | Tacs Games | Tacs Games | September 26, 2019 | |
| Barry the Bunny | lightUp | Ratalaika Games | August 13, 2021 | |
| Baseball Riot | 10tons | 10tons | January 19, 2018 | |
| Bash The Bear | FuryLion | FuryLion Group | January 16, 2019 | |
| Basketball | Sabec | Sabec | November 28, 2018 | |
| Basketball Club Story | Kairosoft | Kairosoft | June 3, 2021 | |
| Basketball Pinball | Super PowerUp Games | SuperPowerUpGames | June 4, 2021 | |
| Bass Pro Shops: The Strike Championship Edition | Saber Interactive | Planet Entertainment | October 23, 2018 | |
| Bastion | Supergiant Games | Supergiant Games | September 13, 2018 | |
| Bat Boy | Sonzai Games | X Plus Games | May 25, 2023 | |
| Batbarian: Testament of the Primordials | Dangen Entertainment | Dangen Entertainment | October 15, 2020 | |
| Baten Kaitos I & II HD Remaster | Monolith Soft | Bandai Namco | September 15, 2023 | |
| Batman: Arkham Asylum | Rocksteady Studios | Warner Bros. Games | December 1, 2023 | |
| Batman: Arkham City | Rocksteady Studios | Warner Bros. Games | December 1, 2023 | |
| Batman: Arkham Knight | Rocksteady Studios | Warner Bros. Games | December 1, 2023 | |
| Batman: Arkham Trilogy | Rocksteady Studios | Warner Bros. Games | December 1, 2023 | |
| Batman: The Enemy Within | Telltale Games | Telltale Games | October 2, 2018 | |
| Batman: The Telltale Series | Telltale Games | Telltale Games | November 14, 2017 | |
| Batora: Lost Haven | Stormind Games | Team17 | April 6, 2023 | |
| BATS: Bloodsucker Anti-Terror Squad | Ritual Games | The Media Indie Exchange | October 20, 2021 | |
| Battery Jam | Halseo | Halseo | November 22, 2018 | |
| Battle & Crash | Sims | Starsign | July 18, 2019 | |
| Battle Axe | Henk Nieborg | JP: Toybox; WW: Numskull Games | April 29, 2021 | |
| Battle Brothers | Ukiyo Publishing | Ukiyo Publishing | March 11, 2021 | |
| Battle Calculator | Blacksmith DoubleCircle | Blacksmith DoubleCircle | August 5, 2021 | |
| Battle Chasers: Nightwar | Airship Syndicate | THQ Nordic | May 15, 2018 | |
| Battle Chef Brigade | Trinket Studios | Adult Swim Games | November 20, 2017 | |
| Battle for Blood | YFC Games | YFC Games | January 22, 2021 | |
| Battle Hunters | Phase Two | Phase Two | November 5, 2020 | |
| Battle of Archers | Gametry | Gametry | October 14, 2021 | |
| Battle of Kings | Wenkly Studio | Wenkly Studio | September 17, 2020 | |
| The Battle of Mahjong | Kusone Studio | Kusone Studio | September 5, 2019 | |
| Battle Planet: Judgement Day | Threaks | Wild River Games | October 17, 2019 | |
| Battle Princess Madelyn | Causal Bit Games | Causal Bit Games | December 20, 2018 | |
| Battle Princess Madelyn Royal Edition | Causal Bit Games | Causal Bit Games | April 9, 2020 | |
| Battle Spirits: Connected Battlers | FuRyu | FuRyu | April 14, 2022 | |
| Battle Supremacy | Atypical Games | Atypical Games | August 2, 2018 | |
| Battle Supremacy: Evolution | Atypical Games | Atypical Games | September 12, 2019 | |
| Battle Supremacy: Ground Assault | Atypical Games | Atypical Games | September 5, 2019 | |
| Battle Worlds: Kronos | King Art | THQ Nordic | June 11, 2019 | |
| Battlefield Waltz | Idea Factory | Idea Factory | April 13, 2023 | |
| Battleground | Sabec | Sabec | January 30, 2020 | |
| Battleship | Marmalade Game Studio | Marmalade Game Studio | July 24, 2019 | |
| Battlesloths | Invisible Collective | Invisible Collective | February 27, 2020 | |
| Battlestar Galactica Deadlock | Black Lab Games, Slitherine | Slitherine Software | October 8, 2019 | |
| Battlezone: Gold Edition | Rebellion Developments | Rebellion Developments | November 8, 2018 | |
| Battlloon | noname studio | Sony Music Entertainment | February 28, 2019 | |
| Battojutsu | Kikkawa Keita | Caerux | December 12, 2019 | |
| Batu Ta Batu | 2Awesome Studio | JP: EastAsiaSoft; WW: 2Awesome Studio | September 4, 2020 | |
| Bayala: The Game | Independent Arts Software | EuroVideo Medien | October 24, 2019 | |
| Bayonetta | PlatinumGames | Nintendo | February 16, 2018 | |
| Bayonetta 2 | PlatinumGames | Nintendo | February 16, 2018 | |
| Bayonetta 3 | PlatinumGames | Nintendo | October 28, 2022 | |
| Bayonetta Origins: Cereza and the Lost Demon | PlatinumGames | Nintendo | March 17, 2023 | |
| BDSM: Big Drunk Satanic Massacre | Big Way Games | JP: EastAsiaSoft; WW: Big Way Games | October 10, 2019 | |
| Be a Poker Champion! Texas Hold'em | SilverStarJapan | SilverStar | May 13, 2021 | |
| BE-A Walker | Sonka | Sonka | February 28, 2020 | |
| Beach Bounce Remastered | Dharker Studio | Gamuzumi | May 6, 2021 | |
| Beach Buggy Racing | Vector Unit | Vector Unit | September 14, 2017 | |
| Beach Buggy Racing 2: Island Adventure | Vector Unit | Vector Unit | March 17, 2021 | |
| Beach Volleyball Challenge | Simplicity Tomasz Dyrak | Simplicity Tomasz Dyrak | September 24, 2021 | |
| Beacon Pines | Hiding Spot Games | Fellow Traveller | September 22, 2022 | |
| The Bear And The Admiral | Jack Boylan | Jack Boylan | October 7, 2021 | |
| Bear and Breakfast | Gummy Cat | Armor Games | September 15, 2022 | |
| Bear with Me | Exordium Games | Exordium Games | July 9, 2019 | |
| Bear with Me: The Lost Robots | Exordium Games | Exordium Games | July 31, 2019 | |
| Bear's Restaurant | Odencat | Odencat | June 17, 2021 | |
| Beast Breaker | Vodeo Games | Vodeo Games | September 23, 2021 | |
| Beast Quest | Torus Games | Maximum Games | October 11, 2019 | |
| Beasts of Maravilla Island | Banana Bird Studios | Whitethorn Digital | June 12, 2021 | |
| Beat Cop | Michael Hicks | 11 Bit Studios | March 5, 2019 | |
| Beat Me! | Red Limb Studio | Red Limb Studio | November 13, 2020 | |
| Beat Rush | FuryLion | FuryLion Group | July 16, 2018 | |
| Beat Them All | Pix Arts | Pix Arts | September 11, 2021 | |
| Beats Runner | FuryLion | FuryLion Group | October 4, 2019 | |
| Beauties Unveiled | Somequest | Somequest | January 18, 2024 | |
| Beauties Unveiled 2 | Somequest | Somequest | February 29, 2024 | |
| Beautiful Desolation | The Brotherhood | Untold Tales | May 28, 2021 | |
| Beauty Bounce | Dharker Studio | Gamuzumi | July 8, 2021 | |
| Bedtime Blues | Hannmade Studios | Forever Entertainment | January 17, 2019 | |
| Bee Simulator | Varsav Games | JP: Oizumi Amuzio; WW: Varsav Games | November 14, 2019 | |
| BeeFense BeeMastered | ByteRockers Games | ByteRockers Games | May 31, 2021 | |
| Beekyr Reloaded | Akaoni Studio | Akaoni Studio | June 14, 2018 | |
| Before I Forget | Plug In Digital | Plug In Digital | April 29, 2021 | |
| Behind the Frame: The Finest Scenery | Silver Lining Studio | Akupara Games, Akatsuki Taiwan | June 2, 2022 | |
| Behind The Screen | 18Light | Cosen | August 23, 2018 | |
| Behold the Kickmen | Size Five Games | Ant Workshop | June 18, 2020 | |
| Beholder: Complete Edition | Warm Lamp Games | Curve Digital | December 6, 2018 | |
| Beholder 2 | Warm Lamp Games | Alawar Premium | August 15, 2019 | |
| Being Stronger While Playing! SilverStar Go DX | Silver Star Japan | Silver Star | June 25, 2020 | |
| Ben 10 | Torus Games | Outright Games | November 10, 2017 | |
| Ben 10: Power Trip | PHL Collective | Outright Games | October 9, 2020 | |
| Bendy and the Dark Revival | Joey Drew Studios | Joey Drew Studios | July 11, 2025 | |
| Bendy and the Ink Machine | Joey Drew Studios | Rooster Teeth Games | November 20, 2018 | |
| Besiege | Spiderling Studios | Spiderling Studios | September 12, 2024 | |
| Best Day Ever | ReRolled Studio | ReRolled Studio | July 2, 2021 | |
| Best Friend Forever | Steve Jackson Games | Asmodee | August 27, 2020 | |
| Best Sniper Legacy: Dino Hunt & Shooter 3D | T-Bull | T-Bull | May 27, 2021 | |
| Between Time: Escape Room | mc2games | mc2games | September 15, 2021 | |
| Beyblade Burst Battle Zero | FuRyu | FuRyu | October 25, 2018 | |
| Beyblade X: Xone | GrooveBox Japan | FuRyu | November 14, 2024 | |
| Beyond Blue | E-Line Media | E-Line Media | November 11, 2021 | |
| Beyond Enemy Lines: Essentials | Polygon Art | Polygon Art | March 19, 2020 | |
| Beyond Enemy Lines: Remastered Edition | Polygon Art | Polygon Art | September 16, 2021 | |
| Beyond Good & Evil: 20th Anniversary Edition | Ubisoft | Ubisoft | June 25, 2024 | |
| Bezier: Second Edition | Thalamus Digital Publishing | Thalamus Digital | January 21, 2021 | |
| Beyond a Steel Sky | Revolution Software | Microids | November 30, 2021 | |
| BFDIA 5b | Jacknjellify; Wondering Crew | Jacknjellify | TBA | |
| BFF or Die | 2Awesome Studio | 2Awesome Studio | November 27, 2020 | |
| Bibi & Tina at the Horse Farm | Treva Entertainment | NA: Treva Entertainment; PAL: Markt & Technik | October 10, 2019 | |
| Big Bash Boom | Big Ant Studios | Big Ant Studios | December 13, 2018 | |
| Big Bobby Car: The Big Race | Independent Arts Software | Wild River | September 24, 2020 | |
| Big Brain Academy: Brain vs. Brain | Nintendo EPD | Nintendo | December 3, 2021 | |
| Big Buck Hunter Arcade | Soma Sim | Kalypso Media | October 16, 2018 | |
| The Big Con | Mighty Yell | Skybound Games | June 1, 2022 | |
| Big Crown: Showdown | Hyper Luminal Games | Sold Out | January 10, 2019 | |
| Big Dipper | Top Hat Studios | Top Hat Studios | August 13, 2020 | |
| The Big Journey | Konstructors Entertainment | Nestor Yavorskyy | October 31, 2019 | |
| Big Pharma | Nussoft | Klabater | December 5, 2019 | |
| Big Rumble Boxing: Creed Champions | Survios | Survios | September 3, 2021 | |
| Bike Rider DX | Spicysoft | Spicysoft | February 8, 2018 | |
| Big Vehicle Simulator Games Bundle - Truck Farming Flight Construction Bus Ship | SC Olivex Soft | SC Olivex Soft | October 12, 2023 | |
| Bill & Ted's Excellent Retro Collection | LJN | Limited Run Games | February 17, 2023 | |
| Billion Road | Acttil | Bandai Namco Entertainment | November 29, 2018 | |
| Billy Bomber | Jakub Lange | Ultimate Games | October 15, 2019 | |
| Binaries | Ant Workshop | Ant Workshop | September 28, 2017 | |
| Binarystar Infinity | Ricci Cedric Design | Forever Entertainment | February 4, 2021 | |
| The Binding of Isaac: Afterbirth+ | Nicalis | Nicalis | March 17, 2017 | |
| The Binding of Isaac: Rebirth | Nicalis | Pikii | November 22, 2018 | |
| The Binding of Isaac: Repentance | Nicalis | Nicalis | November 4, 2021 | |
| Bingo | SIMS Co., Ltd. | Starsign | March 15, 2018 | |
| Biolab Wars | Forever Entertainment | Forever Entertainment | November 15, 2019 | |
| Biomutant | Experiment 101 | THQ Nordic | May 14, 2024 | |
| BioShock | Blind Squirrel Games | 2K | May 29, 2020 | |
| BioShock 2 | Blind Squirrel Games | 2K | May 29, 2020 | |
| BioShock Infinite | Blind Squirrel Games | 2K | May 29, 2020 | |
| BioShock: The Collection | Blind Squirrel Games | 2K | May 29, 2020 | |
| Biped | Next Studios | JP: Bilibili; WW: Meta Publishing | July 2, 2020 | |
| Bird Game + | Bryan Tabor | Ratalaika Games | May 3, 2019 | |
| Birdie Wing: Golf Girls' Story | WOWWOW Technology | WOWWOW Technology | June 15, 2023 | |
| Birds and Blocks | Sprakelsoft | Sprakelsoft | September 18, 2020 | |
| Birthday of Midnight | Petite Games | Ratalaika Games | October 2, 2020 | |
| Birushana: Rising Flower of Genpei | Idea Factory | Idea Factory | September 17, 2020 | |
| Bishoujo Battle Cyber Panic! | EastAsiaSoft, Zoo Corporation | EastAsiaSoft | March 11, 2021 | |
| Bishoujo Battle Mahjong Solitaire | eastasiasoft, ZOO Corporation | eastasiasoft | July 22, 2021 | |
| Bit Dungeon Plus | KintoGames | Dolores Entertainment | March 8, 2018 | |
| Bite the Bullet | Mega Cat Studios | Graffiti Games | August 13, 2020 | |
| Bitlogic: A Cyberpunk Arcade Adventure | OXiAB Game Studio | OXiAB Game Studio | June 27, 2019 | |
| Bit.Trip Beat | Choice Provisions | QubicGames | December 25, 2020 | |
| Bit.Trip Core | Choice Provisions | QubicGames | December 25, 2020 | |
| Bit.Trip Fate | Choice Provisions | QubicGames | December 25, 2020 | |
| Bit.Trip Flux | Choice Provisions | QubicGames | December 25, 2020 | |
| Bit.Trip Presents... Runner2: Future Legend of Future Alien | Choice Provisions | QubicGames | February 20, 2024 | |
| Bit.Trip Runner | Choice Provisions | QubicGames | December 25, 2020 | |
| Bit.Trip Void | Choice Provisions | QubicGames | December 25, 2020 | |
| Biz Builder Delux | Kairosoft | Kairosoft | December 3, 2020 | |
| Black & White Bushido | Good Catch | Good Catch | October 25, 2018 | |
| Black Bird | Onion Games | Onion Games | October 18, 2018 | |
| Black Book | Morteshka | HypeTrain Digital | August 10, 2021 | |
| Black Future '88 | Super Scary Snakes | JP: Teyon; WW: Good Shepherd Entertainment | November 21, 2019 | |
| Black Jack | Sabec | Sabec | May 14, 2020 | |
| Black Jack World Tour | Dolores Entertainment | Dolores Entertainment | February 18, 2021 | |
| Black Legend | Warcave | Warcave | March 25, 2021 | |
| Black Paradox | Fantastico Studio | Digerati | May 3, 2019 | |
| Black Rainbow | Ocean Media | Ocean Media | April 9, 2020 | |
| Black the Fall | Sand Sailor Studio | Sand Sailor Studio | December 14, 2017 | |
| Black Widow: Recharged | AdamVision Studios, SneakyBox | Atari | October 28, 2021 | |
| Blackjack Hands | Minimol games | QUByte Interactive | October 20, 2020 | |
| Blackmoor 2 | Four Fats | Four Fats | January 6, 2020 | |
| Blacksad: Under the Skin | Pendulo Studios, Ys Interactive | Microids | December 10, 2019 | |
| Blacksea Odyssey | Digerati | Digerati | December 24, 2018 | |
| Blacksmith of the Sand Kingdom | Rideon | Kemco | January 7, 2021 | |
| Blackwind | Drakkar Dev | Blowfish Studios | January 20, 2022 | |
| Blade II: The Return of Evil | Action Square | Action Square | June 19, 2019 | |
| Blade Arcus: Rebellion from Shining | Studio Saizensen | Sega | March 14, 2019 | |
| Blade Assault | TeamSuneat | Neowiz | March 31, 2023 | |
| Blade of Darkness | Rebel Act Studios | Qubic Games | November 24, 2022 | |
| Blade Runner: Enhanced Edition | Nightdive Studios | Alcon Entertainment | June 23, 2022 | |
| Blade Strangers | Studio Saizensen | Nicalis | August 28, 2018 | |
| Bladed Fury | Next Studios | PM Studios | January 22, 2021 | |
| Blades of Time | Gaijin Entertainment | Gaijin Entertainment | May 14, 2019 | |
| Blair Witch | Bloober Team | JP: NA Publishing; WW: Lionsgate Games | June 25, 2020 | |
| Blasphemous | The Game Kitchen | JP: Team17; WW: The Game Kitchen | September 10, 2019 | |
| Blasphemous 2 | The Game Kitchen | Team 17 | August 24, 2023 | |
| Blast Brawl 2 | Mind's Eye Games | Mind's Eye Games | August 27, 2020 | |
| Blast Brigade vs. the Evil Legion of Dr. Cread | Allods Team | My.Games | April 13, 2022 | |
| Blaster Master Zero | Inti Creates | Inti Creates | March 3, 2017 | |
| Blaster Master Zero 2 | Inti Creates | Inti Creates | March 20, 2019 | |
| Blaster Master Zero 3 | Inti Creates | Inti Creates | July 29, 2021 | |
| Blaster Master Zero Trilogy: MetaFight Chronicle | Inti Creates | Inti Creates | July 29, 2021 | |
| Blastful | Playstige Interactive | Playstige Interactive | February 25, 2021 | |
| BlazBlue: Central Fiction | Arc System Works | JP: Arc System Works; NA: Aksys Games; EU: PQube | February 7, 2019 | |
| BlazBlue: Cross Tag Battle | Arc System Works | Arc System Works | May 31, 2018 | |
| Blaze and the Monster Machines: Axle City Racers | 3D Clouds | Outright Games | October 1, 2021 | |
| Blazerush | Targem Games | Targem Games | February 19, 2019 | |
| Blazing Beaks | QubicGames | QubicGames | May 10, 2019 | |
| Blazing Chrome | JoyMasher | The Arcade Crew | July 11, 2019 | |
| Blazing Strike | RareBreed Makes Games | Aksys Games | October 17, 2024 | |
| Bleach: Brave Souls | KLab Games | KLab Games | July 11, 2024 | |
| Bleak Sword DX | more8bit | Devolver Digital | June 8, 2023 | |
| Bleed | Bootdisk Revolution | Digerati | December 14, 2017 | |
| Bleed 2 | Bootdisk Revolution | Digerati | March 8, 2018 | |
| Bleep Bloop | Ludipe & Friends | Zerouno Games | January 31, 2019 | |
| Blind Men | Man Eater Games | Ratalaika Games | April 17, 2020 | |
| Blind Postman | DillyFrame | DillyFrame | September 24, 2021 | |
| Blind Shot | Pixel Trapps | Tendokore | March 28, 2024 | |
| Blindy | Radoslaw Felich | Ultimate Games | November 8, 2019 | |
| Blink: Rogues | Fox Dive Studio | Ultimate Games | May 7, 2021 | |
| Blitz Breaker | Boncho Games, Ratalaika Games | eastasiasoft | July 7, 2021 | |
| Blizzard Arcade Collection | Blizzard Entertainment | Blizzard Entertainment | February 19, 2021 | |
| BlobCat | BySamb | BySamb | August 9, 2018 | |
| Block Puzzle | Pix Arts | Pix Arts | September 3, 2021 | |
| Block-a-Pix Deluxe | Lightwood Games | Lightwood Games | March 21, 2019 | |
| Blocky Puzzle | Benjamin Kistler | Kistler Benjamin | June 15, 2021 | |
| Bloo Kid 2 | winterworks | Headup Games | November 18, 2019 | |
| Blood Bowl 3 | Cyanide Studio | Nacon | TBA | |
| Blood Breed | Cool Small Games | Cool Small Games | February 21, 2020 | |
| Blood Waves | Sometimes You | Sometimes You | March 15, 2019 | |
| Blood Will Be Spilled | Attu Games | Attu Games | February 20, 2020 | |
| BloodRayne Betrayal: Fresh Bites | WayForward | Ziggurat Interactive | September 9, 2021 | |
| BloodRayne: ReVamped | Terminal Reality | Ziggurat Interactive | November 18, 2021 | |
| BloodRayne 2: ReVamped | Terminal Reality | Ziggurat Interactive | November 18, 2021 | |
| Bloodroots | Paper Cult | Paper Cult | February 28, 2020 | |
| Bloodshore | Wales Interactive | Wales Interactive | November 3, 2021 | |
| Bloodstained: Curse of the Moon | Inti Creates | Inti Creates | May 24, 2018 | |
| Bloodstained: Curse of the Moon 2 | Inti Creates | Inti Creates | July 10, 2020 | |
| Bloodstained: Ritual of the Night | ArtPlay, Dico | 505 Games | June 25, 2019 | |
| Bloody Bunny | Digital Innovative Design and Technology Center | DigiPen Game Studios | March 11, 2021 | |
| Bloody Zombies | Paw Print Games | nDreams | December 23, 2017 | |
| Bloons TD 5 | Ninja Kiwi | Ninja Kiwi | June 13, 2018 | |
| Blossom Tales: The Sleeping King | Castle Pixel | FDG Entertainment | December 21, 2017 | |
| Blossom Tales 2: The Minotaur Prince | Castle Pixel | Playtonic Friends | August 16, 2022 | |
| Blow Up Monsters | Piotr Skalski | Piotr Skalski | February 4, 2021 | |
| Blue Fire | Robi Studios | Graffiti Games | February 4, 2021 | |
| Blue Reflection | Gust Co. Ltd. | Koei Tecmo | July 30, 2026 | |
| Blue Reflection Ray | Gust Co. Ltd. | Koei Tecmo | July 30, 2026 | |
| Blue Reflection: Second Light | Gust Co. Ltd. | Koei Tecmo | October 21, 2021 | |
| Blue Reflection: Sun | Gust Co. Ltd. | Koei Tecmo | July 30, 2026 | |
| Blue Rider | Ravegan, Ratalaika Games | EastAsiaSoft | December 13, 2018 | |
| The Bluecoats: North and South | Appeal Studios | Microids | October 27, 2020 | |
| Bluey: The Videogame | Artax Games | Outright Games | November 17, 2023 | |
| Bob Help Them | No Gravity Games | No Gravity Games | March 11, 2021 | |
| Bocce | Benoit Varasse | Pix Arts | June 26, 2021 | |
| Body of Evidence | Empyrean | No Gravity Games | December 17, 2020 | |
| BodyQuest | Artax Games | Artax Games | March 25, 2021 | |
| Bohemian Killing | Ultimate Games | Ultimate Games | March 23, 2020 | |
| Bokosuka Wars II | Pygmy Studio | Pygmy Studio | March 19, 2020 | |
| Boku to Joi no Shinsatsu Nisshi | Entergram | Entergram | January 30, 2020 | |
| Boku to Nurse no Kenshuu Nisshi | Entergram | Entergram | August 29, 2019 | |
| Bokuhime Project | Wizard Soft | Nippon Ichi Software | April 23, 2020 | |
| Bokura no School Battle | Sat Box | Sat Box | March 12, 2020 | |
| Bomb | Sabec | Sabec | May 7, 2020 | |
| Bomb Chicken | Nitrome | Nitrome | July 12, 2018 | |
| Bomb Rush Cyberfunk | Team Reptile | Team Reptile | August 18, 2023 | |
| Bomber Crew | Runner Duck Games | JP: Teyon; WW: Curve Digital | July 10, 2018 | |
| Bomber Fox | Laughing Fox Games | Forever Entertainment | September 17, 2020 | |
| BombFall | Tackorama | Tackorama | March 12, 2019 | |
| Bombfest | Sudden Event Studios | Whitethorn Digital | January 31, 2019 | |
| Bombing Busters | Sanuk Games | Sanuk Games | October 8, 2018 | |
| Bombslinger | Mode4 | Plug In Digital | April 11, 2018 | |
| Bonds of the Skies | Kemco | Kemco | March 14, 2019 | |
| Bone Marrow | Huge Pixel | Ratalaika Games | August 6, 2021 | |
| Bonfire Peaks | Draknek & Friends | Draknek | September 30, 2021 | |
| Bonito Days | Studio Somewhere | Studio Somewhere | October 14, 2021 | |
| Bonkies | Studio Gauntlet | Crunching Koalas | January 29, 2021 | |
| Book of Demons | Thing Trunk, Sonka} | 505 Games | April 30, 2020 | |
| The Book of Unwritten Tales 2 | King Art Games, The Adventure Company} | THQ Nordic | February 5, 2019 | |
| Bookbound Brigade | Digital Tales | Intragames | January 30, 2020 | |
| Boom Blaster | BigBread | ChiliDog Interactive | February 19, 2021 | |
| Boomerang Fu | Cranky Watermelon | JP: Flyhigh Works; WW: Cranky Watermelon | August 13, 2020 | |
| Boomerang X | Dang! | Devolver Digital | July 8, 2021 | |
| Boost Beast | Arzest | Arc System Works | July 20, 2017 | |
| Boot Hill Bounties | Experimental Gamer Studios | Experimental Gamer Studios | April 14, 2020 | |
| Boot Hill Heroes | Experimental Gamer Studios | Experimental Gamer Studios | December 15, 2020 | |
| Borderlands: Game of the Year Edition | Gearbox Software | 2K | May 29, 2020 | |
| Borderlands: The Handsome Collection | Gearbox Software | 2K | May 29, 2020 | |
| Boreal Blade | Frozenbyte | Frozenbyte | August 28, 2019 | |
| Boris The Rocket | toR Studio | Big Way | April 30, 2021 | |
| Boss Rush: Mythology | Alexey Suslin | Ultimate Games | October 31, 2020 | |
| Bossgard | Sand Sailor Studio | Sand Sailor Studio | July 15, 2020 | |
| Bot Vice | DYA Games | DYA Games | April 11, 2019 | |
| BOT.vinnik Chess | DeepGreen Games | Silesia Games | September 2, 2021 | |
| Boulder Dash 30th Anniversary | BBG Entertainment | BBG Entertainment | February 27, 2020 | |
| Boulder Dash Deluxe | BBG Entertainment | BBG Entertainment | September 9, 2021 | |
| Bounce Mania | Benoit Varasse | Pix Arts | May 14, 2021 | |
| Bouncing Hero | ZPink | Turtle Cream | January 21, 2021 | |
| Bouncy Bob | All Those Moments | Ultimate Games | April 27, 2018 | |
| Bouncy Bob 2 | MadGamesmith | Ultimate Games | November 20, 2019 | |
| Bouncy Bullets | Petite Games | Ratalaika Games | July 11, 2019 | |
| Bouncy Bullets 2 | Petite Games | Ratalaika Games | October 8, 2021 | |
| Bounty Battle | Dark Screen Games | Merge Games | September 10, 2020 | |
| Bow to Blood: Last Captain Standing | Tribetoy | Tribetoy | April 3, 2019 | |
| Bowling | Sabec | Sabec | November 28, 2019 | |
| Box Align | QUByte Interactive | QUByte Interactive | April 11, 2019 | |
| BoxBoy! + BoxGirl! | HAL Laboratory | Nintendo | April 26, 2019 | |
| Boxing Champs | Raz Games | Raz Games | June 20, 2019 | |
| A Boy and His Blob | WayForward | Ziggurat Interactive | November 4, 2021 | |
| Boyfriend Dungeon | Kitfox Games | Kitfox Games | August 11, 2021 | |
| BPM: Bullets Per Minute | Awe Interactive | Playtonic Friends | September 8, 2022 | |
| BQM: BlockQuest Maker | Wonderland Kazakiri | Wonderland Kazakiri | December 27, 2018 | |
| The Bradwell Conspiracy | A Brave Plan | Bossa Studios | October 10, 2019 | |
| Braid Anniversary Edition | Thekla | Thekla | May 14, 2024 | |
| Brain Breaker | Erik Games | Erik Games | January 25, 2021 | |
| Brain Meltdown: Into Despair | Onfire Games | CFK | October 28, 2021 | |
| BrainZ | Enigma Entertainment, Delta Bright Bilişim | Polygon Art | November 12, 2020 | |
| Bratz: Flaunt Your Fashion | Petoons Studio | Outright Games | November 4, 2022 | |
| Brave Dungeon + Dark Witch's Story: Combat | Inside System | Inside System | September 27, 2017 | |
| Braveland Trilogy | Tortuga Team | Ellada Games | March 7, 2019 | |
| Bravely Default 2 | Claytechworks | JP: Square Enix; WW: Nintendo | February 26, 2021 | |
| BraveMatch | Playstige Interactive | Playstige Interactive | April 22, 2021 | |
| Brawl | Bloober Team | QubicGames | January 12, 2018 | |
| Brawl Chess | Red Deer Games | Red Deer Games | November 26, 2020 | |
| Brawlhalla | Blue Mammoth Games | Ubisoft | November 6, 2018 | |
| Brawlout | Angry Mob Games | Angry Mob Games | December 19, 2017 | |
| Break Dot | Caerux | Caerux | September 3, 2020 | |
| Breakers Collection | Visco Corporation | QuByte Interactive | January 12, 2023 | |
| Breakfast Bar Tycoon | Baltoro Games | Baltoro Games | March 20, 2020 | |
| #Breakforcist Battle | Lucid Sheep Games | Lucid Sheep Games | April 12, 2018 | |
| Breakout Beyond | Choice Provisions | Atari | March 25, 2025 | |
| Breakout: Recharged | Adamvision Studios, SneakyBox | Atari | February 10, 2022 | |
| Breakpoint | Studio Aesthesia | The Quantum Astrophysicists Guild | September 24, 2020 | |
| Breathedge | HypeTrain Digital | HypeTrain Digital | April 6, 2021 | |
| Breathing Fear | Drageus Games | Drageus Games | December 6, 2019 | |
| Breeder Homegrown: Director's Cut | Sometimes You | Sometimes You | March 6, 2020 | |
| Brewmaster: Beer Brewing Simulator | Auroch Digital | Fireshine Games | October 27, 2022 | |
| The Bridge | The Quantum Astrophysicists Guild | The Quantum Astrophysicists Guild | September 7, 2017 | |
| Brick Bat Crazy | IndieRevo | IndieRevo | April 2, 2021 | |
| Brick Breaker | Sanuk Games | Nacon | January 3, 2019 | |
| Bridge! 3 | Aerosoft | Aerosoft | April 9, 2020 | |
| Bridge Builder Adventure | BoomBit Games | BoomBit Games | February 7, 2020 | |
| Bridge Constructor Portal | ClockStone | Headup Games | February 28, 2018 | |
| Bridge Constructor Ultimate Edition | ClockStone | Headup Games | January 31, 2020 | |
| Bridge Constructor: The Walking Dead | ClockStone | Headup Games | November 19, 2020 | |
| Bridge Strike | Project R3D | Project R3D, Drageus Games | June 5, 2020 | |
| Brief Battles | Juicy Cupcake | Juicy Cupcake | February 21, 2020 | |
| Brigandine: The Legend of Runersia | Matrix Software | Happinet Games | June 25, 2020 | |
| Bright Paw | Radical Forge | Rogue Games | October 16, 2020 | |
| Brightstone Mysteries: Paranormal Hotel | Cateia Games | Ocean Media | July 23, 2020 | |
| Bring Honey Home | Benjamin Kistler | Kistler Benjamin | June 8, 2021 | |
| Bring It to Mom | InCiti Games | KrzysztofPodsada | August 20, 2020 | |
| Bring Them Home | Andrey Kharchenko | Higgs Games | December 20, 2018 | |
| Broforce | Free Lives | Devolver Digital | September 6, 2018 | |
| Broken Age | Double Fine Productions | Double Fine Productions | September 13, 2018 | |
| Broken Lines | Porta Play | Super.com | April 23, 2020 | |
| Broken Roads | Drop Bear Bytes | Versus Evil | April 10, 2024 | |
| Broken Sword 5: The Serpent's Curse | Revolution Software | Revolution Software | September 21, 2018 | |
| Brotato | Thomas Gervraud | Blobfish | August 3, 2023 | |
| Brotherhood United | Myoubouh | Silesia Games | March 12, 2020 | |
| Brothers: A Tale of Two Sons | Starbreeze Studios | 505 Games | May 28, 2019 | |
| Brothers Conflict: Precious Baby | Idea Factory | Idea Factory | August 29, 2019 | |
| Brunch Club | Foggy Box Games | Yogscast | August 29, 2019 | |
| Brunswick Pro Billiards | Farsight Studios | Farsight Studios | October 14, 2020 | |
| Brutal Rage | 2Bad Games | 2Bad Games | February 16, 2021 | |
| Bubble | Sabec | Sabec | April 30, 2020 | |
| Bubble Bobble 4 Friends | Taito | Inin Games | November 19, 2019 | |
| Bubble Bubble Ocean | Benoit Varasse | Pix Arts | February 6, 2021 | |
| Bubble Cats Rescue | Cool Small Games | Cool Small Games | July 5, 2019 | |
| Bubble Shooter DX | EntwicklerX | EntwicklerX | January 10, 2019 | |
| Bubble Shooter FX | EntwicklerX | EntwicklerX | September 16, 2021 | |
| Bubsy in: The Purrfect Collection | Limited Run Games | Atari | September 9, 2025 | |
| Bubsy: Paws on Fire! | Choice Provisions | UFO Interactive Games | August 29, 2019 | |
| Bucket Knight | Sometimes You | Sometimes You | February 28, 2020 | |
| Bud Spencer & Terence Hill: Slaps and Beans | Trinity Team | Buddy Productions | October 18, 2018 | |
| Buddy Collection if: Shukumei no Akai Ito | PLiCy | PLiCy | April 26, 2018 | |
| Buddy Mission Bond | Koei Tecmo | Nintendo | January 29, 2021 | |
| Buddy Simulator 1984 | Not a Sailor Studios | Not a Sailor Studios, Feardemic | October 27, 2022 | |
| Bug Academy | Igrek Games | Ultimate Games | March 23, 2020 | |
| The Bug Butcher | Awfully Nice Studios | 2Awesome Studio | November 8, 2018 | |
| Bug Fables: The Everlasting Sapling | Moonsprout Games | Dangen Entertainment | May 28, 2020 | |
| Bugsnax | Young Horses | Young Horses | April 28, 2022 | |
| Build a Bridge! | BoomBit Games | BoomBit Games | January 17, 2019 | |
| Buildings Have Feelings Too! | Blackstaff Games | Merge Games | April 22, 2021 | |
| Buissons | Tambouille | Tambouille | August 19, 2021 | |
| Bulb Boy | Bulbware | Bulbware | July 6, 2017 | |
| Bullet Battle: Evolution | Troooze, Forza Games | Troooze | June 6, 2019 | |
| Bullet Beat | Ternox | Ternox | October 21, 2020 | |
| The Bullet: Time of Revenge | Art Games Studio | Art Games Studio | May 7, 2020 | |
| Bullet Trail | Piotr Skalski | Piotr Skalski | January 11, 2021 | |
| Bulletstorm: Duke of Switch Edition | People Can Fly, Epic Games | Gearbox Publishing | August 30, 2019 | |
| Bullseye | Sabec | Sabec | June 17, 2021 | |
| The Bunker | Splendy Games | Wales Interactive | April 9, 2018 | |
| Bunnies High School | Otomate | Idea Factory | TBA | |
| Bunny Adventure | Inlogic | 11Sheep | August 20, 2020 | |
| Bunny Bounce | Dharker Studios | Gamuzumi | July 22, 2021 | |
| Bunny Garden | Qureate | Qureate | April 18, 2024 | |
| Burger Chef Tycoon | Baltoro Games | Baltoro Games | August 2, 2019 | |
| Burger Master | Piotr Skalski | Piotr Skalski | February 16, 2021 | |
| BurgerTime Party | G-Mode | JP: G-Mode; WW: Xseed Games | October 8, 2019 | |
| Buried Stars | Studio Largo | Line Games | July 30, 2020 | |
| Burly Men at Sea | Brain & Brain Seaven Studio | Plug In Digital | April 12, 2018 | |
| Burn! SuperTrucks | Jorge Biedma Azuar | Jorge Biedma Azuar | January 29, 2021 | |
| Burnout | GameToTop | GameToTop | October 29, 2023 | |
| Burnout Paradise Remastered | Criterion Games | Electronic Arts | June 19, 2020 | |
| Burnstar | Nerve Software | Gearbox Publishing | July 2, 2018 | |
| Burst Shooter | FunAlter Games | FunAlter Games | October 15, 2020 | |
| Bury Me, My Love | The Pixel Hunt | Arte France, Plug In Digital | January 10, 2019 | |
| Bus Driver Simulator | KishMish Games | Ultimate Games | November 13, 2020 | |
| Bus Fix 2019 | Ultimate Games | Ultimate Games | July 3, 2019 | |
| Bush Hockey League | V7 Entertainment | V7 Entertainment | April 14, 2022 | |
| Bushiden | Pixel Arc Studios | Pixel Arc Studios | TBA | |
| Business Tour Deluxe | Creobit | 8Floor Games | October 7, 2021 | |
| Bustafellows | eXtend | JP: eXtend; WW: PQube | December 19, 2019 | |
| Butcher | Transhuman Design | Crunching Koalas | September 28, 2017 | |
| Butto Bird | LOCOBIT | Shogakukan | June 18, 2024 | |
| Button Button Up! | Centrosphere Games | Circle Entertainment | September 26, 2019 | |
| Button City | Subliminal | Wings Interactive | August 10, 2021 | |
| Byakko: Shijin Butai En Renki | Otomate | Idea Factory | May 28, 2025 | |
| Byakko-tai Samurai Boys | OperaHouse Corporation | OperaHouse | February 4, 2021 | |
