= Zangetsu =

Zangetsu (n) (残月, Jap: "morning moon" or "moon visible in the morning") may refer to:

== In the real world ==
- A Chinese zen master of the Tang dynasty named Zangetsu.

== In fiction ==
- A technique used by Superbia in 11eyes: Tsumi to Batsu to Aganai no Shōjo. Written as 斬月 (literally "Moon Cutting").
- A sword used by the character Ichigo Kurosaki in the Bleach series. Written as 斬月 (literally "Slaying Moon").
- A Knightmare Frame mecha piloted by Kyoshiro Tohdoh in the anime Code Geass. Written as 斬月 (literally "Cut the Moon").
- A move performed by the character Hitomi in the Dead or Alive fighting game series.
- A fictional exorcist and the protagonist of Bloodstained: Curse of the Moon
- A Kamen Rider form of Takatora Kureshima in tokusatsu series, Kamen Rider Gaim. Written as 斬月 (literally "Slaying Moon").
