= The Future You've Been Dreaming Of =

2022 video game

The Future You’ve Been Dreaming Of
- Developer(s): qureate
- Publisher(s): qureate
- Producer(s): Yujiro Usada
- Platform(s): Nintendo Switch, Windows
- Release: Windows: WW: May 19, 2022; PC: WW: July 14, 2022
- Genre(s): Life simulation, adventure
- Mode(s): Single-player, multiplayer

The Future You’ve Been Dreaming Of (Japanese: ノゾムキミノミライ, Hepburn: Nozomu Kimi no Mirai) is a 2022 stealth-like life simulation video game by qureate for Nintendo Switch and PC. The player takes on the role of a ghost spirit in the house of a young woman and must guide her to the best "future".

== Gameplay ==
The player takes the role of a zashiki-warashi spirit (of Japanese folklore) inside the apartment building of a college student named Usui Sachi, who cannot see the player. The goal is to peek into her private life and interfere by finding and selecting different items in her room, drawing her attention to them, each affecting different parameters of the woman. For example, taking out a book and making her read would increase her intelligence level.

There are a total of 20 different endings depending on the player's inputs and parameters. Additionally, the game also offers the player to change costume, hairstyle and underwear of the woman. It has been described as a "voyeurism simulator".

== Development and release ==
The character design was done by artist Haruyuki Morisawa. Yūki Takada provided the voice for Sachi. The Future You've Been Dreaming Of was released worldwide on the Nintendo eShop on May 19, 2022 and then on PCs via GOG.com and Steam in July 2022.

== Reception ==
Digitally Downloaded scored the game 2 out of 5, being critical of the "poorly translated story", its "sleazy" theme, and for its simulation being "basic".
