= Prison Princess =

2020 video game

- Developer: qureate
- Publisher: qureate
- Director: Naoya Momota
- Producer: Yujiro Usada
- Designers: Emi Amaki; Yuka Onishi
- Platforms: Nintendo Switch, Windows
- Release: Nintendo Switch: WW: January 30, 2020; PC: WW: April 2, 2020
- Genre: Adventure
- Mode: Single-player

Prison Princess (プリズンプリンセス) is a 2020 adventure video game produced by Qureate for Nintendo Switch and Windows. The player helps two captured princesses to escape a castle.

== Gameplay ==
The game takes place across five different rooms and becomes increasingly non-linear. As the player takes the role of a ghost, the player indirectly progresses through the game by giving tasks to the princesses. Using a cursor, items in view are clicked which would attract the princesses' attention and lead to solving the puzzles, which can be either timed or non-timed. A spell can be used a limited amount of times.

The main "gimmick" of the game involves particular puzzles during which the princesses in various suggestive and lewd situation or positions. During these puzzles sections, the player is able to touch up the princesses's bodies, however they are encouraged to avoid all "distraction" and to focus on solving the puzzles. The more the player touches up the princesses during puzzles, the lower the princesses' "affection levels" decrease, and the player will get scolded by the princess upon the puzzle's completion. Completing these puzzles swiftly and without touching the princesses increases the affection level of the princesses. A high affection level is needed to achieve the game's better endings.

== Plot ==
Prison Princess is about a tsundere swordswoman, Princess Zena of Zanji Zed, and a gentle magician, Princess Aria of Aria Zaza, who have been captured and imprisoned by the Demon King. The player is a spirit without a physical body, having died at the hands of the Demon King. Under the name "Great Hero", the player infiltrates and finds princesses Zena and Aria and is tasked to help them escape the castle and simultaneously take back the control of their kingdoms from the Demon King. There are five different endings.

== Development and release ==
The game was announced on December 11, 2019. Produced by Yuujirou Usuda, the character designs were done by Ai Akasa and Inui Waon, while Fumiko Uchimura and Mao Amatsuka provided the voices for the princess characters Zena and Aria respectively. It was released digitally on the Nintendo eShop globally on January 30, 2020. It was soon ported to PC and released on GOG.com and Steam.

== Reception ==
Reception

Aggregate score
Aggregator	Score
Metacritic	73/100 (NS)

Review score
Publication	Score
Nintendo Life	7/10

Prison Princess received "mixed or average" critical reviews according to review aggregator Metacritic. Pete Davison of Nintendo Life gave praise to the characters, artwork and narrative.

== Sequel ==
A new Prison Princess game, titled Prison Princess: Trapped Allure, was announced in October 2024. The game features a new third princess, Julietta, as well as the original two. It released on November 21, 2024. Despite being released in English speaking territories on Steam, and being advertised as a Nintendo Switch release in English regions, the game is currently only available on the Japanese eShop.
