= Bunny Garden =

2024 video game

- The game's cover, depicting the three main girls. Form left to right: Rin, Kana, and Miuka.
- Developer: Qureate
- Publisher: Qureate
- Producer: Yujiro Usada
- Artist: Kazune Inui
- Writer: Takayushi Muto (Synthese)
- Platforms: Nintendo Switch, Windows
- Release: Nintendo Switch: WW: April 18, 2024; PC: WW: April 19, 2024
- Genre: Dating sim
- Mode: Single-player

Bunny Garden (Japanese: バニーガーデン) is a 2024 dating sim video game developed and published by Qureate, released for Nintendo Switch and PC. It is set in a bar where female bunny girl employees entertain guests, and the player develops romantic relationships with the employees while drinking.

== Gameplay ==
Gameplay screenshot showing the player interacting with Rin

The player-protagonist interacts with and attempts to develop relationships with the varied cast of bunny girls at the bar. This is done by buying them expensive drinks, snacks, chatting, and playing games with them. The player can also peek at each girl's underwear, making use of a system called "PTA". However the player should also acknowledge their funds and may rack up debt.

== Characters ==
The protagonist is called Haito Kanda. The three cast members at the club are: Kana (Mio Hoshitani), Rin (Eri Suzuki) and Miuka (Masumi Tazawa). In September 2024, it was announced that an additional member girl will be added in the game as an update.

== Development and release ==
Bunny Garden was produced by Qureate's Yujiro Usada. Previously while employed at D3 Publisher, Usada had worked on the Dream Club games, developed by Tamsoft. Some Japanese publications had compared elements of Bunny Garden with Dream Club.

Bunny Garden was released on the Nintendo eShop, Steam and GOG.com platforms. The Asian branch of Arc System Works released the Nintendo Switch version, including physically, in Asian territories on July 25, 2024. A physical version on Switch is set to be released in Japan in December 2024 by Kadokawa Game Linkage which will include bonus content such as a soundtrack CD and newly recorded ASMR voices.

== Reception ==
Following the game's launch, Bunny Garden achieved a degree of popularity, especially among Vtubers online. In Japan, the game initially topped the digital sales charts. In June 2024, Good Smile Company announced that it will develop a Nendoroid figurine of character Rin, Bunny Garden's first merchandise figure.

== See also ==
- Dream Club
