= Bouncy Bullets =

- Developer: Petite Games
- Publisher: Ratalaika Games
- Platforms: PlayStation 4, PlayStation Vita, Xbox One, Switch
- Release: July 9, 2019: PlayStation 4; NA: July 9, 2019; PAL: July 10, 2019; PlayStation Vita; NA: July 9, 2019; EU: July 10, 2019 Xbox One; WW: July 10, 2019 Nintendo Switch; EU: July 11, 2019; NA: July 12, 2019
- Genres: Platform, shooter
- Mode: Single-player

Bouncy Bullets is a first-person shooting platform video game developed by Petite Games and published by Ratalaika Games for the PlayStation 4, PlayStation Vita, Xbox One, and Nintendo Switch in July 2019.

== Gameplay ==
Gameplay screenshot

Bouncy Bullets has 84 levels, all of which require the player needing to platform and shoot enemies to get to the end (a blue portal) of its levels.

The game has 2 types of bullets, purple and yellow, with the colors killing the matching colored enemies. There are also black and grey colored enemies. To kill a black enemy, the player needs to have any colored bullet land on the black enemy in a bounce, while shooting a grey enemy with any colored bullet will cause the player to lose. Yellow and purple boxes can only be broken when shot with the matching color bullet.

Each level has a timer, with the faster the player completes a level, the better score the player receives.

== Reception ==
Reception

Aggregate score
Aggregator	Score
Metacritic	61/100 (Note: Based on 4 reviews.)

Review scores
Publication	Score
Cubed3	5/10 (PS4)
Gaming Age	C- (all consoles)
Switch Player	3/5 (Switch)

Bouncy Bullets on PlayStation 4 received "mixed or average reviews" from critics, receiving a 61/100 score on review aggregator Metacritic.

In a review for Cubed3, Josh Di Falco praised how the game's levels are quick to start and also believed that Bouncy Bullets was designed to "be a time sink" and that it was designed to provide the player with a "few hours of fun for a low price."

Gaming Age's Matthew Pollesel stated that the game is almost unplayable on the PlayStation Vita due to the controls being "lousy," but also stated that the game still ran smoothly on the platform. Pollesel criticized how the game required the player to make precise jumps, which was made more difficult due to the "floaty" movement. Pollesel ended his review by stating that the game "ends up being more frustrating than anything else."

== Legacy ==
On June 20, 2020, Petite Games announced on Twitter that a sequel to Bouncy Bullets was in development and would be released for the PlayStation 4, Nintendo Switch, Xbox One, and possibly the PlayStation Vita. The sequel, Bouncy Bullets 2, was released in 2021. Reviewers noted the sequel's improved movement controls compared to its predecessor.

Bouncy Bullets was two of the games YouTuber PS4Trophies completed during his world record of most Platinum Trophies received on a PlayStation 4 in 20 hours.
