= Bloodstained: Ritual of the Night =

2019 video game

- Cover art by Mana Ikeda
- Developer: ArtPlay (Note: Additional development by DICO and WayForward. Mobile ports developed in associate with NetEase.)
- Publishers: 505 Games; NetEase (Note: Mobile ports.)
- Director: Shutaro Iida
- Producer: Koji Igarashi
- Designer: Shutaro Iida
- Programmer: Shingo Tate
- Artists: Takato Yamashita; Damon DuBois; Justin Criswell
- Writer: Koji Igarashi (Note: Uncredited.)
- Composers: Ippo Yamada; Michiru Yamane; Keisuke Ito; Ryusuke Fujioka; Atsuhiro Ishizuna
- Series: Bloodstained
- Engine: Unreal Engine 4
- Platforms: PlayStation 4; Windows; Xbox One; Nintendo Switch; Android; iOS; Stadia
- Release: PS4, Windows, Xbox One; 18 June 2019; Nintendo Switch; 25 June 2019; Amazon Luna; 20 October 2020; Android, iOS; 3 December 2020; Stadia; 6 July 2021
- Genres: Action role-playing, Metroidvania
- Modes: Single-player, multiplayer

Bloodstained: Ritual of the Night is a 2019 action role-playing game developed by indie studio ArtPlay and published by 505 Games. The game is considered a spiritual successor to the Castlevania series, and was released for PlayStation 4, Windows, Xbox One, and Nintendo Switch in June 2019, for Amazon Luna in October 2020, for Android and iOS in December 2020, and for Stadia in July 2021.

ArtPlay, an independent studio co-founded by former Castlevania producer Koji Igarashi, used the crowdfunding platform Kickstarter to demonstrate the demand for the game to potential sources of funding for it in 2015. The campaign successfully raised more than $5.5 million from backers, eleven times its original goal, making it one of the most successful video game campaigns on the platform. Ritual of the Night received generally positive reviews upon release, with many describing it as a worthy successor to the Castlevania games that inspired it. Most of the stretch goals from the Kickstarter campaign were distributed as free content updates, with a few additional items as paid downloadable content.

Ritual of the Night was the second game to be released in the Bloodstained series; a retro-style companion game, Bloodstained: Curse of the Moon, was developed by Inti Creates as a stretch goal and released earlier in May 2018. It received a sequel, Bloodstained: Curse of the Moon 2, in July 2020. A prequel, Bloodstained: The Scarlet Engagement, was announced in 2021 and planned for release in 2027.

== Gameplay ==
The game follows the Metroidvania-style gameplay of the post-Symphony of the Night games of the Castlevania series. As Miriam, the player explores a labyrinthine series of rooms presented as a platform game, fighting monsters and bosses and gaining keys or powers that let them explore previous areas that were previously impossible to reach. Miriam is able to use various weapons to perform melee or ranged attacks to defeat monsters, or special abilities granted by the shards she possesses from monsters to perform magical attacks. Miriam has both a health bar and a magic power bar. Health is lost to monster and environmental attacks, and should this drop to zero, the game is over, requiring the player to load the last save state. Health can be restored by using items or finding health drops from monsters or environmental pieces. Magic power is drained by using shard skills, and if out of mana, the player cannot use shard skills, but mana can be similarly regained as with health.

The player gains new weapons, armor and accessories throughout the game by defeating monsters and looting chests. This equipment provides various attributes to Miriam along with offensive and defensive bonuses. For weapons, this also set the type of attacks that the player can make. For example, short swords allow a variety of fast, close-ranged attacks, spears enable slow but long-reaching attacks, and guns allow for long-distance shots but with no melee possibilities. The equipment can be changed on the fly via menu screens. Shards are obtained by defeating monsters, and generally contain a power reflecting the essence of the monster it came from. The player can only equip a limited number of shards, but like equipment, shards can be swapped out on the fly.

Among the maze of rooms include save rooms, allowing the player to save their game and fully regenerate Miriam's health and magic power. Additionally, warp rooms allow the player to quick jump from one region of the map to another previously discovered warp room. Following the game's prelude, the player also gains access to a set of non-playable characters located at the start of the map that provide stores to buy and sell weapons, shards, ingredients and crafting services to make new weapons or upgrade shards. The game is presented in a 2.5D style, presenting the game in three-dimensional graphics but restricting movement to a 2D system. Igarashi stated the choice for 2.5D was to follow the style of previous Castlevania games, such as The Dracula X Chronicles and Mirror of Fate.

== Plot ==
Bloodstained takes place in 19th-century England during the Industrial Revolution. Fearing the loss of influence over their wealthy patrons, the Alchemy Guild created Shardbinders, humans forcibly fused with demonically charged crystals that attuned them to their powers. These Shardbinders were sacrificed by the Guild to summon demons from Hell in what was meant to be a scare tactic but instead brought uncontrollable destruction that wiped out the Guild and much of England until the Church was able to banish them. Of the sacrificed Shardbinders, only two survive: a male, Gebel, and a young female, Miriam, who falls into an unnatural sleep before she can be sacrificed.

Ten years later, in the game's present day, Miriam has awakened from her slumber to find England infested by a new horde of demons. She learns that Gebel is responsible, as he considers himself to be a demon and intends to bring forth a new Hell while taking revenge on the surviving Guild members. Accompanied by her caretaker Johannes, they sail across the ocean to Arvantville, a destroyed village on the outskirts of Gebel's castle, the Hellhold. They meet with Johannes's friend Dominique, an exorcist who helped Johannes care for Miriam during her slumber and has been sent by the Church to help them stop Gebel.

As Miriam begins her journey into the Hellhold, she confronts Alfred, a surviving member of the Alchemy Guild and the former mentor to Johannes. Alfred seeks to recover an ancient book used in the demon summoning by Gebel, the Liber Logaeth, and threatens to kill Miriam if she does not leave. As his former student, Johannes deeply distrusts Alfred's motives and fears he may be making another mistake, partially feeling responsible for the actions that Alfred and the other alchemists took in harming Gebel, Miriam, and the other Shardbinders. She also crosses paths multiple times with Zangetsu, a demon hunter from Japan who initially distrusts Miriam due to her Shardbinder powers having ties to demons, but over time begins to respect her strength. Zangetsu explains that he is seeking a demon named Gremory, who is continuously eluding him for fear of his power. He gives Miriam his katana thinking that Gremory will not expect her to be wielding it and drop her guard.

Miriam confronts Gebel in the Hellhold's throne room, and she attempts to reason with him by reminding him that during the trauma of her transformation into a Shardbinder, he was the one who taught her to never give up on her humanity. Though he briefly seems moved by her words, Gebel remains defiant and the two Shardbinders fight. Should Gebel be killed, he will thank Miriam for stopping him, but the game will immediately end as Miriam wonders if she made the right choice. Using Zangetsu's katana, Miriam instead exposes Gremory's hiding place in the throne room and she escapes. Freed from the demon's control, Gebel is only able to give Miriam his final apologies before the crystals in his body consume him completely. Alfred then arrives to steal the Liber Logaeth from them and flees.

Miriam chases Gremory and Alfred through a dimensional portal into another part of the castle. Inside, she finds Alfred mortally wounded and the Liber Logaeth gone. As he dies, he explains that he was trying to use the Liber Logaeth as part of a spell he had cast throughout the Hellhold to destroy it. He also reveals that he was the one who put Miriam in her slumber ten years ago to sabotage the Guild's summoning, knowing her power as a Shardbinder was so immense that it would have brought even worse destruction than what was summoned had she been sacrificed.

Reuniting with Zangetsu, Miriam tracks down Gremory. Zangetsu uses his power to bind the demon in place, but he is seemingly killed in the process and so Miriam defeats Gremory alone. She then locates the Liber Logaeth and the one who stole it: Dominique. Craving the power to defy and destroy God for letting everybody die during the demon summoning ten years ago, Dominique reveals that she has turned herself into a Shardbinder through extensive study of Miriam and Gebel and uses the Liber Logaeth to summon Bael, the king of demons. Miriam banishes Dominique and Bael, and Johannes uses the Liber Logaeth to complete Alfred's spell and destroy the Hellhold.

As peace returns to the land, Miriam mourns the sacrifices made for her victory and wonders if the world will ever truly be free of the demons. Johannes consoles Miriam by revealing that with the Liber Logaeth, he may have the means to permanently stop the crystals from consuming her body. Miriam and Johannes leave Arvantville while an unseen person's shadow steps into view, revealed to be Zangetsu, who survived the events of the story after managing to escape Hell. He retrieves his sword, Zangetsuto, after watching the pair walk away.

=== Dominique's Curse ===
Set after the events of the main game's true ending, it is revealed that Dominique survived the battle with Miriam and now travels Limbo while afflicted with a crystal curse. Managing to confront and defeat Bael, depending on whether she collected all the Logaeth Pages and/or defeated all of the Hunters, she may find herself back in Limbo, and ends up becoming the Queen of Demons, manages to escape from Limbo, but is unable to lift her Crystal Curse, and ends up dying upon returning to the mortal plane of existence or escapes Limbo while having been seemingly cured of her Crystal Curse, but is left amnesiac as a result, and is ultimately discovered by Miriam.

== Development ==
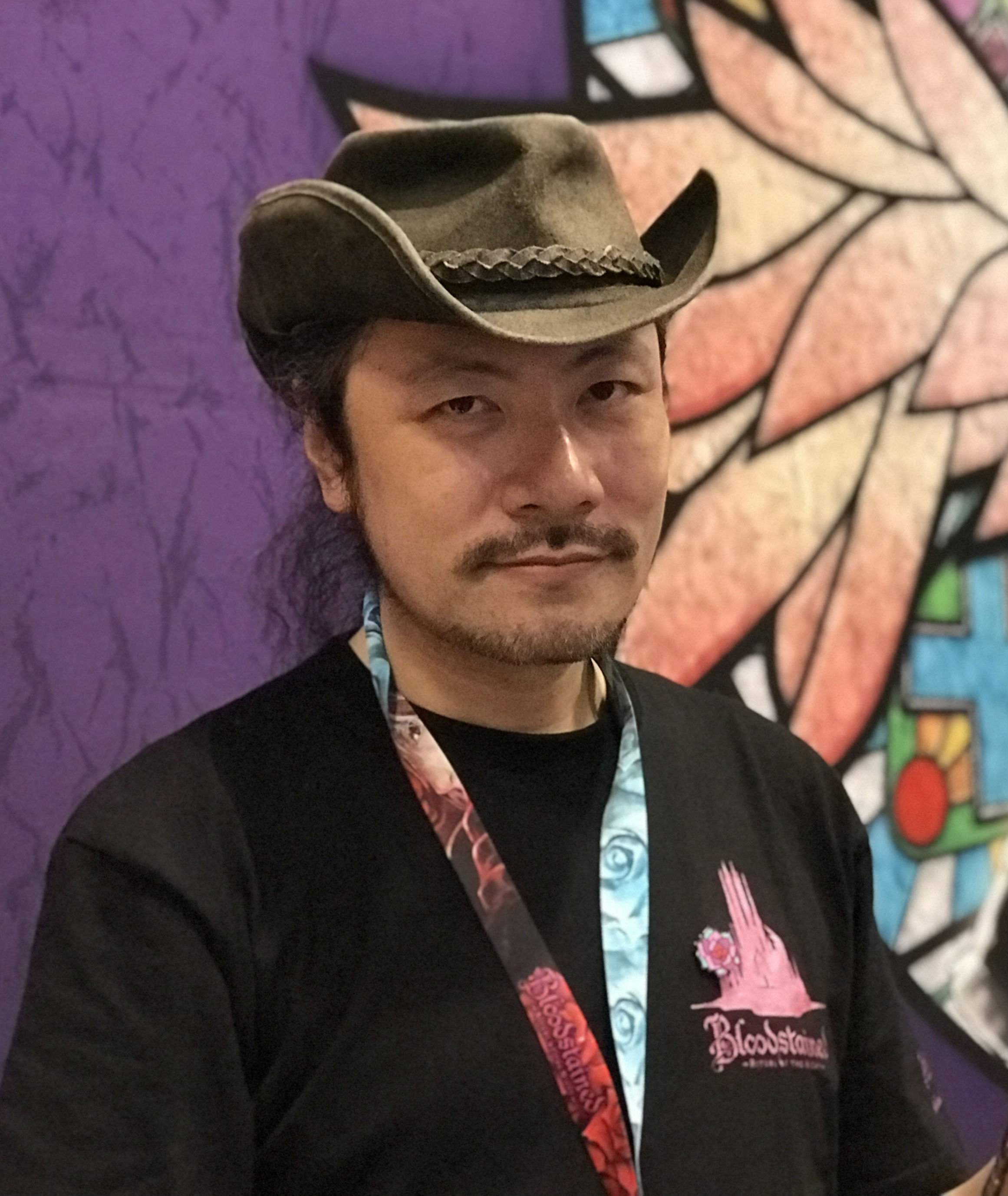
Producer and scenario writer Koji Igarashi at the 2017 New York Comic Con

Bloodstained is a spiritual successor to the Castlevania series by Konami, of which Koji Igarashi had been the series producer from 2001 to 2010. In March 2014, Igarashi opted to leave Konami, stating concern for his continued employment and differences in the directions they wanted to take the company. Igarashi later stated, "For the longest time, when I was working at Konami, I was protected by my company. They took care of me. Now I'm kind of anxious." (Note: Attributed to multiple sources:) Igarashi also stated that he had received a large number of requests from fans to continue to develop Castlevania games, giving him another reason to leave Konami and aim to start his own studio to develop these fan-requested games, including a Metroidvania-styled game with similar themes to Castlevania.

Prior to his departure, news of the success of the Kickstarter for Mighty No. 9, a Mega Man-inspired game produced by the former series producer and artist Keiji Inafune, had reached Japan, and inspired Igarashi that this could be a similar route to obtain funding for a new game. Following his departure, he began pitching for funding of a new game with the help of Digital Development Management's Ben Judd, who has also assisted with Mighty No. 9's funding. They approached more than twenty publishers with the pitch, but found that none of them were willing to help. According to Judd, while Igarashi's reputation reduced the risk involved with the title and the projected budget was modest, the publishers were skeptical. Japanese publishers wanted to make sure that the American and European markets would want the title, and Castlevania games historically were not as well received in European markets. Western publishers believed the Japanese origins of the games were too strange for them. After six months with no success, Igarashi opted to join mobile developer ArtPlay as a paying job, but worked with the company to assure that he would be free to continue to pursue this new game idea.

=== Kickstarter ===
Igarashi recognized the success of Mighty No. 9's Kickstarter, and began seeking how to accomplish the same for his vision. He and Judd were able to locate investors that would help contribute funds, but only if they could show there was a strong interest in the title. The two opted to use Kickstarter to demonstrate what they believed would be a popular title, seeking to gain $500,000 to secure funding that would cover the remaining 10% of development costs. The Kickstarter was launched on 11 May 2015. Promotion and handling of the social media for the Kickstarter campaign was handled by Fangamer. Prior to the Kickstarter, Igarashi teased the announcement through social media using the phrases "igavania" and "sword or whip", and on the day of the announcement, participated in live streaming event via Twitch playing several other Metroidvania titles with various gaming personalities and developers. 2 Player Productions helped with filming Igarashi's pitch for the Kickstarter at Castello di Amorosa in northern California a month prior to its announcement.

The game succeeded in its base goal within four hours of going live, and reached $1.5 million within the first day. Various stretch goals were introduced and met, including obtaining David Hayter as a voice actor for the game. Hayter had originally been slated for the role of Gebel, but ended up as Zangetsu for the final game. Additional stretch goals included hiring Robert Belgrade, the voice of Alucard in Symphony of the Night to have a voice role, and allowing artist Ayami Kojima to create the packaging artwork for physical copies. Other stretch goals included a retro-style companion game titled Bloodstained: Curse of the Moon, support for local co-operative play, a boss rush mode, a "classic mode" which reworks some portions of the game's maps into strictly-linear levels akin to the original Castlevania games, and a roguelike dungeon mode where the player can challenge a procedurally-generated dungeon. In addition to monetary stretch goals, Igarashi offered additional bonuses for all backers based on the amount of social media content the Kickstarter generates, such as followers of the game on Twitter or Facebook or number of pieces of fan artwork submitted to its site. The Bloodstained Kickstarter was successfully funded with more than $5.5M in pledges, and as of June 2015 the highest value video game Kickstarter project, exceeding the previous amount set by Torment: Tides of Numenera. However, about two months afterwards, the Kickstarter for Shenmue III broke Bloodstained's record, raising over $6.3 million in a similar period as Bloodstained.

=== Design ===
Igarashi and ArtPlay developed the game's narrative, design, and overseeing production, while they hired DICO as a third-party publisher around June 2016 to assist in developing the game's assets and level design. The game is published and marketed by 505 Games. Developer Inti Creates, whose name had been associated with Bloodstained earlier in the project, had been involved in developing a mini-game that was released alongside the main game. Bloodstained was developed for Unreal Engine 4. Near the end of 2018, Igarashi announced they had also brought on WayForward to help with some development, specifically in the area of polishing the title. Igarashi had been impressed by WayForward's skill in 2D platform games, such as their Shantae series, and was excited for them to be part of the project.

The game's name is based around the concept of a magi-crystal curse that inflicts the main characters: they grow across the person's body with the appearance of stained glass, and Igarashi felt that "Bloodstained" was a good play on words to reflect that. While the title is thematically based around the Gothic theme like Castlevania, Igarashi did not want to incorporate the public domain character of Dracula into it, feeling it would make the game too close to previous Castlevania titles and did not want to make his new game feel like a "half-baked copy". Igarashi opted to make the main playable character Miriam female based on recognizing current trends in video games in Western markets to present strong female lead characters that the broad range of intended players of either gender would enjoy playing, while avoiding the developmental encumbrances of creating two separate-gendered playable characters.

The game's music was written primarily by Michiru Yamane, a former Konami composer who worked on the music for several Castlevania games, along with the musical group Noisycroak and a single track by Ippo Yamada. Shutaro Iida, who worked on previous Castlevania games as a programmer, director and designer, returned to the game in the role of a planner.

The game features special codes to get items based on YouTube content creators including Game Grumps, Mega64, Vinesauce and Game Sack.

== Release ==
At the end of the Kickstarter in June 2015, Bloodstained was planned for release in 2017 on Linux, OS X, PlayStation 4, PlayStation Vita, Wii U, Windows, and Xbox One, through the campaign's stretch goals. At this point in time, the Unreal Engine 4 was not yet ported to either the Vita or Wii U. Armature Studio was set to do these ports, with plans to release the code base for both the Wii U and Vita ports for free to any studio licensed to work on it once they had overcome the lack of Unreal on these platforms. (Note: Attributed to multiple sources:) During the game's development process, Nintendo discontinued the Wii U and released the Nintendo Switch in March 2017. Igarashi opted to transfer development from the Wii U to the Switch, offering backers who had selected the Wii U version a refund or a choice of the game on a different platform, with the Switch being the default option for backers who had previously chosen the Wii U. Igarashi had started the Kickstarter when the Wii U was the dominant Nintendo platform, but with the introduction of the Switch since that point, he found it difficult to support the Wii U, and called for the transition. The PlayStation Vita version of the game was cancelled in August 2018 due to Sony dropping support for the handheld; backers that desired the Vita release were given the option of selecting the game for a different platform for free or assorted refund options. In December 2018, the team announced that the planned Linux and macOS versions of the game had also been cancelled and would not be offering refunds, citing challenges of supporting middleware and online features.

Though Igarashi originally anticipated a 2017 release, he announced in September 2016 that he was bringing a second studio to help with the development of the game, and delayed the game. Igarashi stated the delay was primarily due to the added work to complete the campaign's stretch goals, a factor he could not consider during the Kickstarter period, and his commitment to making a high quality game, "better than a traditional Igavania game that I've made in the past" and not wanting to back down on quality just to make the original release date. The amount of work in team-hours, along with Inti Creates' inexperience with the Unreal engine to complete some of the concepts he wanted in the game, led Igarashi to bring in additional studios and push back the release date. Igarashi later revealed these studios as DICO, who have experience with localization and global development, and Monobit, for technical assistance with the game engine. With the delay in release, the development teams were able to include an improved visual style to the game, addressing early player concerns about the visuals shown in earlier stages of development.

A single-level demonstration of Bloodstained was made available to play for attendees of Electronic Entertainment Expo 2016, and was released to Kickstarter backers a week later. In July 2016, Igarashi announced that the game had entered full production. The game was playable again at EGX Rezzed 2019.

Bloodstained was released on 18 June 2019 for PlayStation 4, Windows, and Xbox One versions, and was released a week later on 25 June 2019 for the Nintendo Switch. Mobile ports for Android and iOS devices, developed by NetEase and ArtPlay, were announced in October 2020. These ports were released on 3 December 2020. Versions for cloud-based streaming services were released for Amazon Luna and Google Stadia on 20 October 2020 and 6 July 2021, respectively.

As part of the Kickstarter's stretch goals, Inti Creates also developed a companion game, Bloodstained: Curse of the Moon, a NES-stylized platform game with Miriam and Gebel playable alongside the swordsman exorcist Zangetsu and the alchemist Alfred. It was released on Nintendo 3DS, Nintendo Switch, PlayStation 4, PlayStation Vita, and Windows, on 24 May 2018, with an Xbox One port to follow in June 2018. A sequel, Bloodstained: Curse of the Moon 2, was released in July 2020.

=== Downloadable content ===
Following the approach used by Shovel Knight, the game used a post-release content model so that they are able to bring additional content, such as the game modes from the additional Kickstarter stretch goals, over time to avoid release delays. On 10 May 2020, the first of these updates was released, adding Zangetsu as an unlockable character and a Randomizer Mode. The second update on 3 July 2020 added Boss Revenge and Chroma Wheel. The third update, released 10 November 2020, added the playable character Bloodless. The fourth update added Classic Mode and a crossover with Kingdom Two Crowns on 14 January 2021. The fifth update added Aurora from Child of Light as a playable character on 31 March 2022. The sixth update added a crossover with Journey on 23 August 2022. The seventh and final update added Chaos Mode and Versus Mode alongside paid and free cosmetic packs. It was released on 9 May 2024 for all platforms except Nintendo Switch, which received the new content a week later. The final piece of paid DLC, Classic II: Dominique's Curse, was announced at the same time and was released for all platforms on 11 June 2024.

== Reception ==
Reception

Aggregate score
Aggregator	Score
Metacritic	PC: 83/100; PS4: 83/100; XONE: 84/100; NS: 74/100

Review scores
Publication	Score
Game Informer	8.5/10
GameSpot	8/10
IGN	8.8/10
PC Gamer (US)	77%
TouchArcade	4/5
USgamer	4/5

According to review aggregator website Metacritic, Bloodstained: Ritual of the Night received "generally favorable" reviews on PC, PlayStation 4, and Xbox One, and "mixed or average" reviews on Nintendo Switch. (Note: Attributed to multiple sources:)

Writing for Game Informer, Suriel Vazquez concluded that the game's "journey is familiar, but the way it iterates and builds on that familiarity helps distinguish it from its lineage." Steve Watts of GameSpot agreed: "It's that sense of comfort in its own skin that makes Bloodstained such a treat. This isn't a bold modernization of the genre or a departure from its roots. It is exactly what it set out to be: a return to the style of a bygone era, with a few modern improvements." Daemon Hatfield of IGN praised the world design, noting that "exploring the castle's many secrets is a delight". Malindy Hetfeld of PC Gamer echoed this sentiment, stating that "every inch of this castle is waiting to be explored and plundered, and for the most part its backdrops are varied enough to make you want to see what's around the next corner."

At launch, the Nintendo Switch version was seen as inferior to the other versions, with critics citing input lag, washed-out visuals, and stuttering frame rates. In response, the developers shifted their resources to optimizing the Nintendo Switch version with a series of smaller patches instead of having players wait for a single large update.

The PC version was among the best-selling new releases on Steam when it released. (Note: Based on total revenue for the first two weeks on sale.) By June 2020, the game had reached 1 million units sold. Bloodstained would later go on to sell over 2 million units by September 2023.

=== Awards ===
The game was nominated for the Off Broadway Award for Best Indie Game at the New York Game Awards, and won the award for "Control Precision" at the NAVGTR Awards, whereas its other nomination was for "Game, Original Action"; it was also nominated for "Most Promising New Intellectual Property" at the SXSW Gaming Awards.

== Prequel ==
Igarashi had stated that given the amount of time he has spent in developing the Bloodstained intellectual property, he sees the game as "a starting ground" for future Bloodstained games. A sequel was confirmed to be in early development in June 2021, with more development resources to be moved to the project after the completion of the additional content planned for Ritual of the Night, which was completed in May 2024. The sequel, which turned out to be a prequel, was officially revealed in June 2025 as Bloodstained: The Scarlet Engagement, with a planned release in 2026. But in August 2026, the game was delayed to 2027.

== Other media ==
Miriam, Zangetsu, Gebel, and Alfred appeared in the 2018 strategy RPG Kingdom Two Crowns as part of a crossover event in April 2020.

In 2021 Miriam appeared as a playable character in the fighting game Mighty Fight Federation and was featured in a crossover with another indie Metroidvania, Blasphemous, as part of Strife and Ruin update.
