= Bokuhime Project =

- Cover art, featuring Ikusa in the center
- Developer: Wizard Soft
- Publisher: Nippon Ichi Software
- Director: Tatsuya Shiina
- Artist: Fumika Matsushima
- Writer: Kento Jobana
- Platforms: Nintendo Switch; PlayStation 4; Microsoft Windows
- Release: Switch, PS4: JP: April 23, 2020; Microsoft Windows: JP: February 5, 2021
- Genre: Adventure
- Mode: Single-player

Bokuhime Project (Note: Bokuhime Project (Japanese: ボク姫PROJECT; "My Princess Project")) is a mystery adventure video game developed by Wizard Soft. It was published by Nippon Ichi Software in Japan for the Nintendo Switch and PlayStation 4 in 2020, and for Microsoft Windows in 2021. The player takes the role of a young man who infiltrates a school for refined young ladies by enrolling as a female student to investigate an incident involving his sister. As part of their investigation, the player aims to get a seat in an influential organization at the school, and thereby needs to improve their character statistics to raise their character's cuteness, overcoming the other candidates.

The game was directed by Tatsuya Shiina and written by Kento Jobana, with art by Fumika Matsushima, and was originally conceived as an action game, but replanned as an adventure game due to budget concerns. Initially teased in 2017, the project was halted as the publisher was uncertain about the size of the market for a game about cross-dressing; development was eventually greenlit after they had gauged interest through Twitter and built a following by serializing Daukokudo Ikuya's manga Bokuhime-sama to Otome Shugi. Other related media include three short audio dramas and an upcoming short story; Jobana has also mentioned that he wants to develop a sequel to the game set in the Meiji era (1868–1912).

Critics liked the game, calling its themes unique, and praising its story, characters and visuals, but were divided in their opinion on the gameplay. It was ranked as a highly anticipated game among Japanese players in a survey conducted by Famitsu, and almost sold out at online retailers during its first weeks on sale; the developers later described the game as a moderate success. By November 2020, it was noted to have been a contributing factor to the publisher making a profit in the six-month period following its release.

== Gameplay ==
As part of the player's investigation, they interact with characters (top) and raise Ikusa's cuteness statistics through cross-dressing lessons (bottom).

Bokuhime Project is a single-player mystery adventure game in which the player takes the role of a young man who infiltrates a school for refined young ladies to investigate an incident. As part of the investigation, the player aims to improve their character's cuteness to get a seat in a school organization, and to interact with characters including the currently elected students in the organization while maintaining their composure.

To do so, the player takes part in cross-dressing lessons called "Bokuhime Project" to improve three character statistics – Visual, improving feminine appearance; Culture, increasing knowledge as a woman; and Spirit, increasing resistance to feeling ashamed – and partakes in various activities including swimming lessons, tea parties, cosplay, and physical education, to increase their character's femininity; some such training activities unlock character customization options, such as the option to wear a maid costume after training at a maid café.

When the player character's statistics are high enough, the player can play the Girl's Emotion Mode, where they go on stage and answer questions based on their experience and training, and by deriving answers from speech bubbles from the audience, to increase the student body's support for the player character. If they fail, the character Akira gives hints on how to make progress. By raising their cuteness, the player can also access the branching story's different routes.

== Synopsis ==
The story follows Minato Ikusa, who infiltrates Yuriai Private Academy – a school whose student body consists of 99% women – to save his sister Marika who has fallen into a coma after being involved in an incident at the academy, which Yuriai tries to cover up. To do so, he takes his cousin Akira's place at the school while she stays at home, and enrolls as a female student under the name Erika; he additionally attends the school on the boys' side as Minato, living a double life. At the school, there is an organization known as the Four Princesses, which wields considerable influence; Ikusa aims to get a seat in the organization to investigate the incident his sister was involved in, and as such must work toward becoming the most beautiful woman in the school and winning the princess election, overcoming the other candidates and the current Four Princesses. Akira, who is very knowledgeable in male-to-female cross-dressing, helps Ikusa with this, training him in "cross-dressing skills".

Among major characters are Hiyu Shinosaki, a student who supports Ikusa and sees him as a sister, and who is attracted to women; and the misogynist Ouga Rokujou, a student who is the representative of a major company. The students in the Four Princesses include the gyaru princess Lira Hoozuki, a charismatic model; the shrine maiden princess Uran Ryuguuin, a yamato nadeshiko who has been isolated from the world; the imperial princess Hermes Himegami, who appears friendly with Ikusa; and the knight princess Daria Himegami, the protective older sister of Hermes who was friends with Ikusa's sister. Nemesia Himegami, the school director and the mother of Hermes and Daria, also appears, giving Ikusa advice.

== Development ==
Bokuhime Project was developed by Wizard Soft, and was directed by Tatsuya Shiina and written by Kento Jobana, with character designs by Fumika Matsushima. It was originally teased in July 2017, but put on pause due to uncertainties over the number of people who would be interested in a game about cross-dressing due to how the publisher Nippon Ichi Software had not released any games with the theme before; they set up a Twitter account for the game to gauge interest, and greenlit the project two years later after holding polls on the account and after it had gained over 10,000 followers, announcing it in July 2019 with a first trailer. The planning phase took about half a year, and the main production took place over the course of a year.

The game was initially conceived as an action game, but was changed into an adventure game due to budget concerns. The story was originally just themed around the embarrassment of the situation the protagonist finds himself in as he is forced to dress like a woman; Jobana described the finished game's main theme as overcoming gender divisions and understanding people. Because the game follows an "average man", the developers chose to begin the story with carefully setting up the character and the situation leading to him having to wear women's clothing before introducing the cross-dressing elements, despite how players might think that it takes long to get to that part.

Nippon Ichi Software released the game physically and digitally in Japan on April 23, 2020, for the Nintendo Switch and PlayStation 4. Different bonus items were included with pre-orders of it, depending on the retailer, such as tapestries with illustrations, an acrylic stand, and digital wallpapers. Although Nippon Ichi Software publishes many of its Japanese games in the Western market, no plans for an international release have been announced; the developers said in February 2020 that creating an English version may be difficult due to the script's length, but that they would like to if possible, as well as port the game to other platforms. In October the publisher announced that a PC version was under consideration, and it was released for Microsoft Windows on February 5, 2021, through DLsite, with a Steam release following on October 16, 2021.

Although Nippon Ichi Software initially described the game as an "all-ages women's clothing awakening adventure", under the assumption that CERO would give it an age rating of A (all ages), the game was eventually rated B (ages 12 and up), prompting them to release an apology video.

== Reception ==
Reception

Review score
Publication	Score
Famitsu	28/40 (7, 7, 7, 7)

Bokuhime Project was well received by video game publications, (Note: See What's In?, Famitsu, 4Gamer.net, IGN, and Inside) who thought that its themes were unique and left a big impression, and that it was understandable that the publisher would be hesitant in greenlighting a game like it; Famitsu were positively surprised that a game with cross-dressing themes could be published for a mainstream audience. What's In? recommended the game both to fans of otokonoko works, and to people new to the genre.

IGN, Famitsu and What's In? liked the game's story, with Famitsu praising the characters for being easy to empathize with and having a lot of personality, although criticizing the flow of the story for being intense, and the setting for feeling unbelievable; What's In? liked the balance between seriousness and comedy, praising the story's at times unexpectedly dark tone and its manzai humor, and found the supporting cast strong. Dengeki Online liked the game's atmosphere, calling it "refreshing", and thought this was reflected in the cuteness of its opening theme. Gamer, too, liked the music.

Famitsu criticized the game for featuring little interaction, and said that what was there was not very exciting; What's In disagreed, calling it fun to raise the protagonist's cuteness statistics, describing it as feeling similar to role-playing games. They also liked the Girl's Emotion Mode, and appreciated how uncomplicated it was to access the game's different routes. The visuals and illustrations were well received; Inside called them "gorgeous", Famitsu liked the cute aesthetic and "adorable" character designs, and What's In? said that Ikusa's "super cute" design helps motivate the player to make progress in the game.

Bokuhime Project was ranked as one of the most anticipated games of the year among Japanese video game players in a survey conducted by Famitsu in early 2020, and was listed by Kotaku as one of the big video game releases of the season. It almost sold out at online stores by May 2020, particularly the Nintendo Switch version, but did not rank on Famitsu's weekly top 30 chart of best selling physical video games in Japan during its debut week, meaning that retail stores were estimated to have sold less than 2,700 copies on each platform during that time period. In a post-launch interview, the developers described the game as a moderate success, although noted that they saw sales growing over time, and that they had managed to reach people who are not normally interested in bishōjo games or games with cross-dressing themes. In November 2020, Bokuhime Project was noted as a contributing factor to Nippon Ichi Software making a profit in the April–September 2020 period.

== Related media ==
As part of building a fanbase prior to getting the game greenlit, the manga Bokuhime-sama to Otome Shugi (Note: Bokuhime-sama to Otome Shugi (ボク姫様と乙女主義; "My Princess and Maidenism")) by Daikokudou Ikuya was serialized in the magazine Dengeki PlayStation, starting on July 27, 2017, in volume 643, in issue 8 of the appendix DenPlay Comic, and was well received. Two short Bokuhime Project audio dramas were released through Twitter on June 7–8, 2020: one featuring Ikusa and Marika, and one featuring Daria and Ouga. A third audio drama featuring Lira was released on July 26. The 25-track Bokuhime Project Perfect Soundtrack album was released by Nippon Ichi Software on CD on June 26, 2020, through their online store, and includes a karaoke version of the theme song and a newly recorded "full" version of the ending theme, in addition to the original soundtrack. A short story based on the game is planned, which will focus on the relationship between the two highest-ranked characters in a Bokuhime Project character popularity poll that was held in May 2020.

In 2020, Jobana said that he would like to develop a sequel to Bokuhime Project set in the Meiji era (1868–1912), during the founding of Yuriai Private Academy, but that he would have to finish development of another game he was working on at the time before making specific plans.
