= Bloodstained: Curse of the Moon 2 =

- Developer: Inti Creates
- Publisher: Inti Creates
- Director: Hiroki Miyazawa
- Producers: Koji Igarashi; Takuya Aizu
- Artists: Yuta Watanabe; Shin Nakamura
- Composers: Ippo Yamada; Hiroaki Sano; Takumi Sato; Ryo Yoshinaga; Yusuke Sakai; Hiroyuki Sato
- Series: Bloodstained
- Platforms: Nintendo Switch; PlayStation 4; Windows; Xbox One
- Release: July 10, 2020
- Genres: Action, platform
- Modes: Single-player, multiplayer

Bloodstained: Curse of the Moon 2 is a 2020 platform game developed and published by Inti Creates. It was released for Nintendo Switch, PlayStation 4, Windows, and Xbox One, on July 10, 2020. It is the third game in the Bloodstained series and a direct sequel to Bloodstained: Curse of the Moon, itself a spin-off of Bloodstained: Ritual of the Night. The game's graphics and gameplay are done in an 8-bit retro style meant to mimic the early Castlevania games.

The game received largely positive reviews from critics praising the game's visuals and gameplay.

== Plot ==
Although it shares characters with Ritual of the Night, the game takes place in its own continuity and follows on from the events of Curse of the Moon. Gameplay is organized in several episodes. Zangetsu, a demon slayer from the East is the main character of the game. After the events of Bloodstained: Curse of the Moon, Dominique, an exorcist of the church finds out about a mysterious tower that is summoning a demon castle. She sends the demon hunter Zangetsu to stop this invasion. On his way from the tower to the castle, Zangetsu teams up with Dominique, who wields a spear, the rifle-wielding Robert, and Hachi, a corgi piloting a steampunk mech. Zangetsu also obtains a powerful sword called the Soul Eraser. After they defeat Episode 1's final boss, an even more powerful demonic force appears and attempts to consume the entire party, but is stopped by Dominique who becomes possessed while the others escape.

The remaining party members Zangetsu, Robert, and Hachi vow to rescue Dominique, leading to Episode 2. On their way back to the castle, Zangetsu may equip the Zanmatou, a sword that is less powerful than the Soul Eraser, but does not harm righteous beings even if used on them. Near the location of the previous episode's final battle, the party encounters Mephisto, a demon that stores Dominique inside its own body.

If the Zanmatou is equipped, Zangetsu ends the ensuing battle by cleaving Mephisto in half, saving Dominique. The party escapes the castle as it collapses, but as they rest, Dominique realizes the demons are attacking Earth from a base on the Moon. Suddenly, the first game's playable characters Miriam, Alfred and Gebel appear by teleporting to the protagonists' campsite, and join the party in an effort to travel to the Moon and destroy the demon threat for good, thus leading to the Final Episode.

If the Soul Eraser is equipped in the battle against Mephisto at the end of Episode 2, Zangetsu prepares to slay Mephisto, but changes his mind at the last minute to avoid killing Dominique as well. Mephisto survives and unleashes a devastating attack on the party, leaving Robert and Hachi severely wounded. The protagonists manage to escape, and Zangetsu manages to hear the words of Dominique, also still alive, asking him to save her. This leads to the optional Episode EX, where Zangetsu must once again travel to the castle and defeat Mephisto in order to save Dominique, but this time allying with Miriam, Alfred and Gebel. The party manages to slay Mephisto and rescue Dominique, who senses the demonic presence in the Moon. Reunited by the recovered Robert and Hachi, the heroes assess the situation and decide to assault the demons' base, beginning the Final Episode.

In the Final Episode, Zangetsu and his allies must collect materials to build a vessel capable of carrying them to the Moon. Once they find the necessary elements they build the ship and depart for the demons' stronghold. After fighting the demon forces through space in a shoot-'em-up style segment, the vessel crash lands on the lunar surface and the party attacks the palace. They ultimately reach the game's true final boss, Sariel, and defeat it together, banishing the demonic threat forever and freeing Zangetsu from his curse.

If the player ventures through the game in the hardest difficulty and playing with Zangetsu only, the final battle and ending change drastically. Sariel begins out of reach, and Zangetsu must reach its body with the aid of the other six playable characters, who unexpectedly appear to aid him. Once its health is drained Sariel attempts to escape, but Dominique and Hachi help Zangetsu jump high enough to reach it. As his allies attack Sariel all-out, Zangetsu deals the killing blow with a slash so devastating it slices the entire Moon in half. The protagonists' fates are left unknown in this ending.

== Gameplay ==
The player must traverse various levels using Zangetsu, and later, a selection of other characters, each with their own abilities and subweapons. The game consists of multiple chapters, each of which requires the player to replay the stages in different ways. The game has two difficulty levels. In Veteran, players have a limited number of continues if they are defeated, and enemy damage can knock a character back (potentially into more damage, or worse, an instant death pit), similar to classic NES games. In Casual, the player can retry from the last checkpoint endlessly if required, enemies do not knock back the character, and the characters take less damage and have more skill points to use.

== Release ==
The game was given a limited physical release by Limited Run Games in 2021. It was also released as part of the Bloodstained: Curse of the Moon Chronicles collection which contained both the game and its predecessor for Nintendo Switch in Japan in 2023.

== Reception ==
Reception

Aggregate scores
Aggregator	Score
Metacritic	NS: 82/100; PC: 80/100
OpenCritic	86% recommend

Review scores
Publication	Score
Famitsu	32/40
Game Informer	7/10
GameSpot	8/10
IGN	8/10; 8 /10
M! Games	85/100
Nintendo Life	8/10
VentureBeat	85/100

The game received mostly positive reviews of 80/100 on Metacritic for the Windows version, and 82/100 for the Switch version. Fellow review aggregator OpenCritic assessed that the game received strong approval, being recommended by 86% of critics.

Reviewers felt that the game was a proper homage to both Castlevania and retro games. Reviewers also felt the addition of cooperative play was a good addition to the series. Both IGN Italia and IGN Japan praised the game and wide choice of characters. Steve Watts of GameSpot also rated the game 8/10, praising its fusion of "goofy humor" with "macabre imagery", but criticizing how it forces players to replay stages to achieve the true ending. Rob Schubert of Longview Daily News, praised the game, calling it "Nintendo hard" and a game that captures the feel and challenge of retro video games. Adding that the new characters work and improve the game while filling a role without making the game feel crowded.

Four reviewers for Famitsu praised the game as well, praising the pixel art graphics. Thomas Nickel of M! Games also noted the two player and casual modes would assist players who did not have the best reflexes could also enjoy the game.

VentureBeat was positive about the game, but compared the situation with Inti-Creates' own Mega Man 10 in that it is a sequel to a retro themed game.
