= Bear with Me =

- Developer: Exordium Games
- Publisher: Exordium Games
- Engine: Unity
- Platforms: Windows, Linux, macOS
- Release: Episode One: Windows low-resolution; NA: August 8, 2016; Episode Two: Windows; WW: February 15, 2017; Episode Three: Windows; WW: October 5, 2017; The Complete Collection: PlayStation 4, Xbox One, Nintendo Switch, MacOS, Microsoft Windows, iOS, Android; WW: July 9, 2019; The Lost Robots: Microsoft Windows; WW: July 31, 2019
- Genre: Adventure
- Mode: Single-player

Bear with Me is a point-and-click adventure game developed by Exordium Games. It is described as an "episodic noir adventure game", and was released in three episodes, first in August 2016, final in October 2017. A prequel, The Lost Robots, was released in July 2019. The game draws inspiration from film noir and features Amber and her friend - detective Ted E. Bear, who are set on an adventure to find Amber's missing brother Flint. Bear with Me: The Complete Collection, a compilation of the first three episodes, was released on PlayStation 4, Xbox One, Nintendo Switch, Linux, MacOS, Microsoft Windows, iOS, and Android on July 9, 2019.

== Reception ==
Aggregate review scores
Game	Metacritic
Episode One	(Windows) 68%
Episode Two	(Windows) 76%
Episode Three	(Windows) 79%

Bear with Me received generally positive reviews. Adventure Gamers, in a review for all three episodes, praised its story, art style and the well integration of puzzles, but criticized the slow movement speed, and the occasional frustration, giving it 3½ out of 5. Italian magazine The Games Machine gave it 7.9 out of 10, stating "Bear With Me is a nice, old-style point and click adventure, with logical and well designed puzzles, although not too challenging, and a story that blends humour and drama. Not a milestone in the genre, but adventure fans should give it a chance".

=== Episode 1 ===
Hardcore Gamer was less positive in its review for the first episode of the series, arguing "The first episode of Bear With Me still hints at a greater game to come, nicely setting a proper noir tone with some occasional creepy bits and a gleeful dose of snark throughout.", but "it sadly says a lot that the initial outing feels more like a demo for the game than an actual full-fledged chapter of the story." LeveL magazine, on the other hand, gave it 8/10 and praised it as "The first episode of a dark adventure, where childlike elements are mixed with an adult story in a perfect harmony of a noir story".

== Bear with Me: The Complete Collection ==
Reception

Aggregate score
Aggregator	Score
Metacritic	(PS4) 73/100 (XONE) 81/100

Bear with Me: The Complete Collection was published on July 31, 2019, for Xbox One, PlayStation 4, Nintendo Switch, and Microsoft Windows.
