= Blast Brigade vs. the Evil Legion of Dr. Cread =

2022 video game

- Developer: Allods Team Arcade
- Publisher: My.Games
- Platforms: Windows; Nintendo Switch; PlayStation 4; PlayStation 5; Xbox One; Xbox Series X/S
- Release: WW: April 13, 2022
- Genre: Metroidvania
- Mode: Single-player

Blast Brigade vs. the Evil Legion of Dr. Cread is a Metroidvania video game developed by Allods Team Arcade and published by My.Games.

== Gameplay ==
Players control Jeff Jefferson, who must rescue members of the Blast Brigade to get past the defenses of the evil scientist Dr. Cread and save the world. It is a Metroidvania game with twin-stick shooter controls. When players die, they lose money and are sent back to their last checkpoint. New abilities can be gained during gameplay through a device they find. Players can activate any one ability at a time.

== Development ==
After entering early access in October 2021, Blast Brigade was released for Windows, Switch, PlayStation 4 and 5, and Xbox One and Series X/S on April 13, 2022.

== Reception ==
Blast Brigade received positive reviews on Metacritic. Nintendo Life praised its level design, story, boss battles, and loot. Though formulaic, they said it was great and recommended it to Switch owners who are not suffering from genre fatigue. TouchArcade said it "does just about everything a Metroidvania-style game should" and similarly recommended it to fans who had not yet tired of the formula. Nintendo World Report found the combat occasionally frustratingly difficult, but they enjoyed the boss battles. They also felt it was a bit too linear despite the open world. However, they concluded that it is "a solid action game".
