= Blasphemous (video game) =

2019 video game

- Developer: The Game Kitchen
- Publisher: Team17
- Director: Enrique Cabeza
- Producer: Mauricio García
- Designers: Enrique Colinet; Maikel Ortega; Andrés Rodero
- Programmers: Francisco Ureña; Jose Arias; Santiago García
- Writers: Enrique Cabeza; Maikel Ortega
- Composer: Carlos Viola
- Engine: Unity
- Platforms: Windows; Nintendo Switch; PlayStation 4; Xbox One; Linux; macOS; Amazon Luna; Android; iOS
- Release: Windows, Switch, PS4, Xbox One; 10 September 2019; Linux, macOS; 21 September 2020; Luna; 20 October 2020; Android, iOS; 25 November 2024
- Genre: Metroidvania
- Mode: Single-player

Blasphemous is a Metroidvania video game developed by Spanish studio The Game Kitchen and published by Team17. The game was released for Microsoft Windows, PlayStation 4, Xbox One, and Nintendo Switch on 10 September 2019, with Warp Digital handling the console ports. Versions for macOS and Linux were released on 21 September 2020. A version for Amazon Luna was released on 20 October 2020. The mobile port for iOS and Android was released on 25 November 2024. It began as a Kickstarter campaign in 2017. A sequel, titled Blasphemous 2, was released on 24 August 2023.

== Gameplay ==
An area in Cvstodia

Blasphemous is a Metroidvania action-adventure game taking place in the fictional region of Cvstodia. Players assume control of the Penitent One, a silent knight wielding a sword named Mea Culpa, as he travels the land in a pilgrimage.

The game involves exploring Cvstodia while fighting enemies. The Penitent One can fight enemies by attacking them with his sword at close range, or by casting spells that can be learned. By damaging enemies with melee attacks, the player gains Fervor, which is consumed to cast spells. Each enemy has a certain attack pattern which players must learn in order to dodge them and avoid taking damage. Some enemy attacks can be parried by blocking at the right time, leaving foes vulnerable and allowing the Penitent One to counterattack them for increased damage. When getting hit, the protagonist's health decreases; health can be recovered by consuming Bile Flasks. Defeating enemies rewards Tears of Atonement, the game's currency, that can be spent on shops to upgrade the player character and obtain items.

Numerous upgrades can be acquired at various points, which include increasing the Penitent One's maximum health, Fervor and amount of Bile Flasks carried, and unlocking abilities for world exploration and combat. By exploring, interacting with non-player characters and completing sidequests, multiple items can be found which, when equipped, provide stat bonuses, reduce or nullify certain types of damage or provide access to otherwise inaccessible areas. There are collectibles in the form of bones that can be delivered in a certain place to receive rewards, and Children of Moonlight – trapped angels that can be freed by attacking the cages they are in.

There are checkpoints in the forms of altars located in multiple areas of the map. The player can rest in these checkpoints to fully replenish their health and refill any used Bile Flasks, save their progress and equip certain abilities, but doing so will cause all previously slain enemies (excluding bosses) to respawn.

The Penitent One will die if his health is fully depleted, or if he falls into spikes or into a bottomless pit. Upon death, he will respawn in the last checkpoint visited, and a Guilt Fragment will appear in the location of his death (or near it, if he was killed by spikes or falling). The player will have reduced maximum Fervor, and gain less Fervor and Tears of Atonement from enemies, until the Guilt Fragment is recovered by reaching its location and interacting with it. Alternatively, there are certain points where this penalty can be eliminated for a fee. Additionally, after every boss all guilt is alleviated as well.

== Plot ==
=== Setting and characters ===
The game is set in Cvstodia, a land of religion, highly influenced by Roman Catholicism, its iconography, Holy Week in Spain and Spanish culture, particularly that of Andalucía. The land is hallowed by a force known as "The Miracle" (also referred to as "Sorrowful Miracle" or "Grievous Miracle"). This force manifests itself by sometimes blessing and sometimes cursing Cvstodia's inhabitants, transforming them into twisted creatures, subject to eternal torment.

The protagonist is The Penitent One, the sole survivor of the Brotherhood of the Silent Sorrow (called so because their members have agreed to a vow of silence). He wears a helmet that consists of a face mask and barbed wire around a pointed helmet similar to a capirote. His sword originated when a woman, praying for punishment to ease her guilt, repeatedly hit her chest with an effigy of The Twisted One, who is in turn considered the First Miracle. The sword is adorned with spikes as of that of a rose and an effigy. At the beginning of the game, a thorn is given to the Penitent One to attach to the sword's handle, which allows it to feed on its wielder's sins.

During his pilgrimage, the Penitent One meets characters such as Deogracias, who is found in several key moments of the story and acts as a narrator for the game; Redento, a pilgrim who walks with his back bent and his hands tied as a form of penance; Candelaria, an old merchant who sells various items; and Viridiana, who offers assistance to the player in boss battles. There is a governing Church led by His Holiness Escribar, who was reborn as the Last Son of the Miracle long before the game's events.

=== Story ===
Blasphemous begins in the Brotherhood of the Silent Sorrow, a religious order opposed to His Holiness Escribar's authority, after all its members have been massacred. The last of their kind, the Penitent One, is resurrected by the Miracle and departs on a pilgrimage. After defeating the Warden of the Silent Sorrow, he finds Deogracias, who tells him about the Cradle of Affliction, a sacred relic that the Penitent One seeks, and the Three Humiliations he must perform to be deemed worthy to reach it. He also gives the Penitent One a thorn to add to his sword's handle, wounding and feeding off the user's guilt.

The Penitent One travels to different locations in Cvstodia, including the decaying town of Albero, the snowy hills Where Olive Trees Wither, and the underground Desecrated Cistern. He completes the Three Humiliations, each of them involving a trial against a different boss, to obtain the Holy Wounds of Attrition, Contrition and Compunction from the three Holy Guardian Visages. After defeating Esdras of the Anointed Legion on the Bridge of the Three Calvaries, the Penitent One gains access to the Mother of Mothers, the massive cathedral where Escribar and the Cradle of Affliction reside.

Throughout the journey, Escribar's voice is heard, telling his backstory: A long time before the Penitent One began his pilgrimage, His Holiness Escribar had turned his throne away from his congregation, believing that the Miracle had forsaken them. Gradually, the Miracle transformed Escribar into a massive tree which suddenly ignited one day, leaving behind a massive pile of ash, atop which stood Escribar's throne. The Miracle drove countless people to attempt climbing the mountain, but all of them failed, swallowed by the ash. As punishment, they re-emerged from the ash as mindless beasts cursed to carry out the Miracle's will. This included Escribar, who was reborn as the Last Son of the Miracle.

At the top of the Mother of Mothers, the Penitent One encounters Crisanta of the Wrapped Agony, the leader of Escribar's soldiers, also revealed in the prequel comic to be responsible for the Penitent One's first death and throwing his corpse to where the game began. The Penitent One defeats her, but she escapes. He proceeds to defeat Escribar and the Last Son of the Miracle and encounters the mountain of ash, where Deogracias encourages him to climb it and reach the Cradle of Affliction, leading to one of two endings:

- In the default ending, the Penitent One fails to reach the top and sinks into the ash, leaving nothing but his helmet, which Deogracias picks up and deposits next to a pile of countless identical masks, declaring the Penitent One's penance to be over.
- If Deogracias' thorn has reached its final form after completing optional dungeons, the Penitent One successfully reaches the throne, sits there, and stabs himself with the Mea Culpa. His lifeless body turns into a tree and becomes worshiped by the people of Cvstodia as the new Father and Last Son of the Miracle. In a post-credits cutscene, Crisanta reappears and draws the Mea Culpa from the Penitent One's body.

=== Downloadable content ===
Stir of Dawn

In the Stir of Dawn, the Penitent One can optionally meet Jibrael on a New Game+ playthrough, a giant, hunchbacked man with a bugle contorted around his arms. Finding Jibrael in different locations will allow him to play his bugle, releasing the crystal sarcophagi of the Amanecidas, four women created by the Miracle from the immense passion of Laudes, a devotee of the Twisted One. For revering the Twisted One more than the Miracle, the High Wills punished Laudes by sealing her and the Amanecidas away as undead warriors to be awakened only with the Saeta played through Jibrael's bugle. After defeating the Amanecidas, Jibrael can awaken Laudes, who battles the Penitent One with the combined abilities of the Amanecidas. After defeating Laudes, she dies peacefully and Jibrael, implied to have loved Laudes in life, is similarly able to find peace and pass on.

Strife and Ruin

In the Strife and Ruin, a crossover event with Bloodstained: Ritual of the Night, the Penitent One encounters Miriam, Bloodstained's protagonist, trapped in Cvstodia on the Miracle's whim. Unable to return to her realm, the Penitent One has the option to aid her by finding crystal shards scattered throughout Cvstodia in order to repair the portal that will send her back. Reclaiming each shard requires the completion of challenging obstacle courses, each subsequent one more difficult than the last. After collecting the shards, Miriam is able to return home, but not before granting the Penitent One a powerful prayer that will summon her to attack alongside him.

Wounds of Eventide

The Wounds of Eventide adds an ending if certain conditions are met. Upon starting a new game over a completed save file, the Penitent One can access the tomb of Perpetva, a winged female warrior who is encountered as a miniboss in the original game and assists her brother Esdras in his bossfight. She reveals that the Perpetva the Penitent One had fought was nothing more than a replica created by the Miracle, and his utter devotion to his mission had convinced her to aid him in unraveling the truth. Giving him a scapular to show Esdras, it convinces him to help the Penitent One as well, granting him access to the prison of the Exiled Visage, the fourth Holy Guardian Visage. For learning the truth behind the Miracle, it was branded a traitor and imprisoned by its three brothers, its eyes removed so that it would be blind to the truth. By helping the Exiled Visage regain its eyes, the Penitent One is given the ultimate Sword Heart of the Mea Culpa that enables it to wound a soul, and knowledge that Crisanta was being enslaved by the High Wills, the true masterminds behind the Miracle. Using the true Mea Culpa to free Crisanta from the High Wills' control, she grants the Penitent One the Holy Wound of Abnegation, which in combination with the other three Holy Wounds allows him to enter the other side of the Dream, the realm where the High Wills reside. With Crisanta's aid, the Penitent One battles and defeats the Last Son of the Miracle yet again, killing Escribar for good.

With nothing standing before them, the Penitent One and Crisanta confront the High Wills, a trio of human faces with a single mind that constantly weep tears of gold. Having possibly manifested as a result of the Cvstodians' faith, they had created the Miracle in response to the pleas of a youth who would eventually become the Twisted One, a messianic figure in Cvstodian faith. The High Wills selfishly exploit the Cvstodians' guilt and desire for penance, using the Miracle as a means to gather the Cvstodians' faith for their own immortality and splendor. Their threats ultimately fall short on the Penitent One and Crisanta, who cut them down in order to end the Miracle and thus Cvstodia's suffering, freeing those trapped by the Miracle's power such as the Twisted One himself. Kept alive only by the Miracle's whim, the Penitent One finally passes away as the Mea Culpa crumbles into dust, with Deogracias and Crisanta laying his body to rest. In the post-credits cutscene, a massive womb descends from the clouds above into Cvstodia, bearing an unknown humanoid figure within.

== Development ==
Creative director Enrique Cabeza has cited the religious art and iconography of Seville, Spain, as a major influence on Blasphemous's story and design. Cabeza has pointed to Spanish painters such as Bartolomé Esteban Murillo, Francisco Goya, Jusepe de Ribera, Diego Velázquez and Francisco de Zurbarán, particularly noting significant inspiration from Goya's A Procession of Flagellants as it shares its iconography with the Holy Week in Spain, the main inspiration for the game.

=== Downloadable content ===
==== The Stir of Dawn and Spanish dub ====
On August 4, 2020, a free expansion for Blasphemous titled The Stir of Dawn was released for all platforms. The update added New Game+ content and a full Spanish dub.

According to developer Enrique Colinet, the creators of Blasphemous had always wanted to have the game's voices recorded in Spanish, but limited budget allowed for dubbing in only one language. The team opted for English voice acting, aiming towards a wider market. Following the game's commercial success, the developers produced a Spanish dub which featured several renowned Spanish voice actors.

==== Strife and Ruin ====
On February 18, 2021, another free expansion for Blasphemous called Strife and Ruin was released for all platforms. The update added a Boss Rush mode, render mode selection, and challenge rooms.

The update also features a crossover with another indie Metroidvania, Bloodstained: Ritual of the Night, where the main character Miriam needs the help of the Penitent One to complete the Challenge Rooms in order for her to return to her world. The developers also added a new Demake Area that features an 8-bit style to the game that makes it feel more like a classic platformer from the NES era of games.

==== Wounds of Eventide ====
On August 27, 2021, a third expansion, titled Wounds of Eventide was announced.

Wounds of Eventide was released on December 9, 2021 as free DLC. The update is the biggest of the three, mainly adding multiple bosses and non-player characters, quests and items, and an ending (mainly referred to as Ending C, or the "True Ending") that leads directly into the sequel, Blasphemous 2.

== Reception ==
Reception

Aggregate score
Aggregator	Score
Metacritic	NS: 76/100; PC: 77/100; PS4: 78/100; XONE: 82/100

Review scores
Publication	Score
4Players	82%
Destructoid	8/10
Eurogamer	Recommended
GameSpot	7/10
Hardcore Gamer	4/5
IGN	7/10
Jeuxvideo.com	16/20
Nintendo Life	9/10
Nintendo World Report	5/10
PC Gamer (US)	70/100
PC Games (DE)	9/10
Push Square	8/10
VideoGamer.com	7/10

Blasphemous received "generally favorable" reviews according to review aggregator website Metacritic. it received praise for its visual style, combat, boss battles and interconnected world while criticism was reserved towards its level design, gameplay mechanics and backtracking.

In 2021, GQ España named Blasphemous one of the best Spanish-made games ever.

The game won the awards for "Best Spanish Development" and "Indie Game of the Year" at the 2019 Titanium Awards, where it was also nominated for "Best Art".

=== Sales ===
On March 2, 2021, The Game Kitchen and Team 17 announced that Blasphemous had reached 1 million players over all platforms.

=== Physical release ===
On June 29, 2021, The Game Kitchen and Team 17 released a Blasphemous Deluxe Edition for Xbox One, PlayStation 4, and Nintendo Switch.

The Deluxe Edition features a physical copy of Blasphemous, stickers, a poster of Cvstodia, a digital comic book, a digital 195-page artbook, a 32-track digital soundtrack, and two bonus skins for the Penitent One.

Prior to the Deluxe Edition, publisher Team17 partnered with Limited Run Games to produce physical standard and collector's editions for the PlayStation 4 and Nintendo Switch, which opened for pre-orders on November 15, 2019.

== Sequel ==
A sequel was announced to be released on 24 August 2023. The game builds upon the Wounds of Eventide DLC that was released two years before.
