= Qureate =

Japanese video game company

qureate
- Type: K. K.
- Industry: Video games
- Founded: 2018
- Headquarters: Taito, Tokyo, Japan
- Parent: Artumph
- Website: qureate.co.jp

qureate (キュリエイト) is a Japanese video game developer mostly known for producing bishoujo video games.

== History ==
Querate was founded in 2018 as an indie game studio by Yujiro Usada, previously of D3 Publisher and produced games such as Omega Labyrinth. Their debut game was NekoMiko, released in January 2019 on Steam and at the end of the year on Nintendo eShop as well. They made their second game shortly after, NinNinDays. In early 2020, qureate released Prison Princess.

Qureate released a three-volume romance visual novel series named Fantasy Tavern Sextet. In 2021, Qureate announced a horror game, Livestream: Escape from Hotel Izanami.

In January 2024, the company announced Maid of the Dead, Bunny Garden, Fantasista Asuka. In October 2024, a new Prison Princess title was announced.

== Games ==
Title		Release (PC)	Release (Switch)
NekoMiko		January 25, 2019	December 5, 2019
NinNinDays		August 9, 2019	December 3, 2020
Prison Princess		April 3, 2020	January 30, 2020
TroubleDays		February 14, 2020	July 9, 2020
KukkoroDays		July 27, 2020	August 6, 2020
Fantasy Tavern Sextet	Vol.1 〜New World Days〜	December 15, 2020	November 5, 2020
Fantasy Tavern Sextet	Vol.2 〜Adventurer's Days〜	February 19, 2021	January 14, 2021
Fantasy Tavern Sextet	Vol.3 〜Postlude Days〜	May 14, 2021	March 18, 2021
Livestream: Escape from Hotel Izanami		June 11, 2021	April 15, 2021
IdolDays		August 6, 2021	June 17, 2021
NinNinDays2		January 21, 2022	November 18, 2021
Duel Princess		February 4, 2022	January 13, 2022
The Future You've Been Dreaming Of		July 15, 2022	May 19, 2022
Beat Refle		August 1, 2022	TBA
Love on Leave		May 5, 2023	
Sentimental Death Loop		July 28, 2023	July 6, 2023
Livestream 2: Escape from Togaezuka Happy Place		October 6, 2023	September 21, 2023
Maid of the Dead		March 1, 2024	February 15, 2024
Bunny Garden		April 19, 2024	April 18, 2024
Prison Princess: Trapped Allure		November 21, 2024	November 21, 2024
Merry Bunny Garden		October 9, 2025	October 9, 2025
Fantasista Asuka		February 12, 2026	February 12, 2026
