= Bush Hockey League =

2017 video game

- Former logo and title Old Time Hockey.
- Developer: V7 Entertainment
- Publisher: V7 Entertainment
- Platforms: Windows; Xbox One; PlayStation 4 Nintendo Switch
- Release: Microsoft Windows, PlayStation 4; March 28, 2017; Xbox One; November 29, 2017; Nintendo Switch; April 14, 2022
- Genre: Sport
- Mode: Multiplayer

Bush Hockey League (formerly Old Time Hockey) is an ice hockey video game for Windows and PlayStation 4. A version for Xbox One was released on 29 November 2017. A version for the Nintendo Switch was released on 14 April 2022. The game is developed and published by V7 Entertainment.

The game draws inspiration from the 1977 film Slap Shot, and makes multiple references to the film's characters and teams.

== Gameplay ==
The game's setting is the 1970s in the fictional Bush Hockey League (BHL). Executive producer Mike Torillo stated that the game takes inspiration from the 1977 film Slap Shot. Bush Hockey League has an exhibition mode, and a story mode. It features a variety of control schemes, including simplified two-button controls, and a "beer mode" which only requires one hand to control. The game contains 10 playable teams. Game commentary is provided by Matt Baker.

== Reception ==
Reception

Aggregate score
Aggregator	Score
Metacritic	56/100 (PS4); 49/100 (XONE); 48/100 (PC)

Review score
Publication	Score
Game Informer	4.5/10 (PS4)

Critical reception was mixed, with the game getting 56/100 on Metacritic. Some reviewers panned the game, citing laggy gameplay, crashes, and glitches, and detracting from the overall experience. CGMagazine praised the game for its style, and its ability to bring the spirit of the era to life.
