= Bleed (video game) =

2012 video game

- Developer: Bootdisk Revolution
- Engine: LK Engine 4
- Platforms: Windows, OS X, Linux, Xbox 360 (Xbox Live Indie Games), Xbox One, PlayStation 4, Switch
- Release: Xbox Live; December 12, 2012; Windows, OS X February 22, 2013; July 3, 2013 (Steam); PS4; August 22, 2017; Xbox One; August 24, 2017; Switch; December 14, 2017
- Genre: Platform
- Modes: Single-player, multiplayer

Bleed is a platform video game developed by Canadian indie studio Bootdisk Revolution. The game was originally released for Xbox Live Indie Games on December 12, 2012. Bleed was later released for Windows and OS X on February 22, 2013, through Desura and the developer's website, and through Steam on July 3, 2013. In 2017, Bleed was ported to other platforms including Nintendo Switch. A sequel, Bleed 2, was released on February 8, 2017.

== Gameplay ==
Gameplay screenshot

Bleed is a platform game that focuses on combat. In the game's story mode, the player must navigate seven levels, each ending with a boss battle. The player can carry weapons that are used to defeat the enemies that populate each level. Weapons can be fired in any direction using the mouse or a controller's analog stick. The player can equip up to two weapons at a time and switch between them freely, and the player can change their equipped weapons at any time by pausing the game. The player can also jump to avoid obstacles and reach platforms. After initially jumping off of the ground, the player can jump up to two more times in mid-air or off of nearby walls. Bleed also allows the player to slow time briefly in order to dodge hard-to-avoid hazards.

Over the course of the game, the player earns money that can be spent between levels on new weapons and upgrades. The game also includes unlockable characters, and the story mode can be played on several different difficulty levels. In addition to the story mode, the game includes a cooperative mode for two players, an arcade mode where the player has to clear the game with only one life, and a challenge mode where the player can fight multiple bosses at once.

== Plot ==
In the game, the player takes control of Wryn, a girl who hopes to become the "ultimate video game hero" by defeating all of the current heroes. With the player's help, she takes the heroes down one by one, culminating up to the greatest hero of all time, the Giant Dragon. As soon as the Dragon is killed, a crowd of reporters shows up to bring light to the one who vanquished all the heroes. However, before Wryn gets a chance to inform them of her deeds, the unnamed blonde man from the game's opening cutscene arrives and takes all the credit, claiming he killed the heroes. He is then taken to the Hall of Heroes to be inducted as the newest hero, leaving Wryn confused and angry. This plan backfires, though, as the blonde man becomes universally hated across the world since no one wanted a new hero to begin with. Also, Wryn breaks into the Hall of Heroes to stop the induction. The blonde man puts up a good fight but is beaten by Wryn, who then becomes adored by everyone for committing an act of true heroism.

== Reception ==
Bleed has received a fairly positive reception from critics. Tom Mc Shea of GameSpot gave the game a 7.5 out of 10, praising its "smooth and satisfying mechanics," but expressing disappointment in the two-player mode. Indie Games the Weblog's Danny Cowan called Bleed the best game released on Xbox Live Indie Games in 2012, stating, "Bleed is everything I love about run-and-gun platformers squeezed into a tightly designed package, and it's my favorite Xbox Live Indie Game released this year."
