= Bloodstained: Curse of the Moon =

2018 platform game

- Developer: Inti Creates
- Publisher: Inti Creates
- Producers: Koji Igarashi; Takuya Aizu
- Writer: Koji Igarashi
- Series: Bloodstained
- Platforms: Nintendo 3DS; Nintendo Switch; PlayStation 4; PlayStation Vita; Windows; Xbox One
- Release: 3DS, NS, PS4, Vita, Windows: WW: May 24, 2018; EU: May 31, 2018 (3DS); Xbox One: WW: June 6, 2018
- Genre: Platform
- Mode: Single-player

Bloodstained: Curse of the Moon is a 2018 platform game developed and published by Inti Creates. It is a companion title to developer ArtPlay's 2019 game Bloodstained: Ritual of the Night and was conceived to fulfill the promise for a retro-style accompaniment to Ritual of the Night after its Kickstarter campaign exceeded crowdfunding goals. Curse of the Moon follows Zangetsu, a cursed swordsman hunting down demons for revenge, as well as three other playable characters named Miriam, Alfred and Gebel. It features an 8-bit aesthetic and gameplay style similar to Castlevania games on the Nintendo Entertainment System (NES), particularly Castlevania III: Dracula's Curse (1989).

The game was developed in six months, revealed at a Japanese indie game festival, and released two weeks later. The game received positive reviews, with critics praising it as a satisfying homage to Castlevania III. Some felt the game adhered too closely to its inspiration, while others praised new options and game modes for adding a modern feel. The game was found to be short albeit fulfilling for its purpose as a prelude to Ritual of the Night. A sequel, Bloodstained: Curse of the Moon 2, featuring Zangetsu and three new additional characters, was released in July 2020.

== Gameplay ==
Zangetsu approaches an enemy.

Bloodstained: Curse of the Moon is a 2D side-scrolling platformer that plays and looks similar to Castlevania games on the Nintendo Entertainment System (NES), most notably Castlevania III: Dracula's Curse (1989). Like Castlevania III, the game features stages with branching paths that lead to a single boss, and multiple playable characters. The player starts as swordsman Zangetsu, and may recruit up to three other characters as they progress including the whip-wielding Miriam, a magician named Alfred, and the vampire-like Gebel. Each character has different weapons, skills, health points, and attack styles that make them more appropriate for different situations. The player may switch between these characters instantly at any time. If a character dies, they become unavailable for the rest of the level, which may limit the player's ability to explore the remainder of the stage. In such instances, the player can restart the level with all characters again. The player has the ability to enable and disable unlimited lives and the player character is knocked back when hit by an enemy, characteristic of classic Castlevania gameplay. There is also a boss rush mode, and other options to increase game difficulty.

== Plot ==
The story follows Zangetsu, a swordsman searching for revenge upon the demons who magically cursed him. He feels the presence of a great demon, and swears to kill all demons he can find as he quests across the areas of Curse of the Moon. During his search he encounters Miriam, Alfred, and Gebel. Based on how the protagonist treats the other travelers, the ending changes. In all paths, he fights the archdemon Gremory in the final stage. If Zangetsu allies with all three potential party members, Gremory's final attack on the party is blocked by him, who absorbs the dark power and becomes corrupted. Miriam, Alfred, and Gebel manage to escape the castle, but are not able to forget about Zangetsu who was left behind. If the protagonist ignores all three potential party members and travels alone, then the three of them arrive to block Gremory's final attack, sacrificing themselves and saving the main character. If Zangetsu mixes recruiting, ignoring, and killing the others, then he (and any allies) will leave the castle and watch as it crumbles with the sunrise, but the swordsman is not freed from his curse. If Zangetsu chooses to kill the other three and absorb their power he will absorb Gremory's dark energy attack and become the new dark emperor.

In "Nightmare" mode, unlocked if the player defeats the game while recruiting all three potential allies, Miriam, Alfred, and Gebel travel back to the castle to defeat the corrupted Zangetsu, who is that mode's final enemy. The three kill the emperor and free his soul from the curse of the moon.

== Development ==
Bloodstained: Curse of the Moon is a companion title to the larger Bloodstained: Ritual of the Night, a Metroidvania game by former Castlevania series producer Koji Igarashi. When funding for Ritual of the Night was crowdfunded through Kickstarter, one of the stretch goals promised a retro-style prequel minigame. To fulfill this promise, Curse of the Moon was developed by Inti Creates, a team of ex-Capcom employees led by president Takuya Aizu. They had experience creating games in a retro style before, including Mega Man 9 and Blaster Master Zero. They were originally supporting development of Ritual of the Night, but began planning Curse of the Moon after completing the original alpha version of Ritual of the Night for the 2016 E3 trade fair. Inti Creates eventually dropped out of Ritual of the Night development and began working on Curse of the Moon in earnest in late 2017.

The game's overall gameplay and artistic design was primarily managed by Inti Creates, with Igarashi only giving some scenario and setting oversight to ensure a connection to Ritual of the Night. Igarashi thought Inti Creates' experience with 2D games made them a good studio to handle the project, and the studio was eager to attempt it as well. Since the main game would be of the Metroidvania genre, Curse of the Moon was planned from the beginning as a classic-styled game with independent stages and bosses. The team aimed to recapture the essence of 8-bit Castlevania games. They added gameplay elements and features that would have been impossible on 8-bit hardware. Aizu believes that players remember 8-bit games looking better in their memories, and so implemented advanced visual effects that would not have been possible on 8-bit hardware to give players what they expect. This includes very large sprites and more parallax scrolling than possible on the system. To keep the story interesting, Zangetsu was made the main character instead of Miriam who stars in Ritual of the Night, and the timeline was set 10 years in the past. The game was developed in about six months. Although originally planned to be a prequel, Aizu believes the game grew into more of a spin-off.

== Release ==
Inti Creates revealed Curse of the Moon on May 12, 2018, at BitSummit, an annual indie game festival in Kyoto. It was released a couple weeks later on May 24, 2018, on Nintendo 3DS, Nintendo Switch, PlayStation 4, PlayStation Vita, and Windows. The Nintendo 3DS version was delayed to May 31 in Europe. The game was released for Xbox One on June 6. Some eligible Ritual of the Night Kickstarter funders received the game for free. The game was offered for free to Xbox One players in February 2019 through Games with Gold. Limited Run Games released physical versions for the Switch, PlayStation 4 and Vita on March 15, 2019, alongside a more expensive Limited Collector's Edition. It was also released as part of the Bloodstained: Curse of the Moon Chronicles collection which contained both the game and its sequel for Nintendo Switch in Japan in July 2023.

== Reception ==
Reception

Aggregate score
Aggregator	Score
Metacritic	NS: 82/100; PC: 77/100; PS4: 82/100; XONE: 70/100

Review scores
Publication	Score
Destructoid	8/10
Game Informer	7.5/10
IGN	8.2/10; 8.0/10 (Japan)
Nintendo Life	8/10
Nintendo World Report	8/10
PC Gamer (US)	80/100
M! Games	85/100

Bloodstained: Curse of the Moon received "generally favorable" reviews, according to review aggregator website Metacritic. Critics found Curse of the Moon appealing as a tribute to Castlevania games on the NES and believed players who enjoyed those games would enjoy the former. In particular, they believed the game was an homage to Castlevania III: Dracula's Curse because of its branching pathways and multiple playable characters. IGN wrote that the game "treads a thin line between homage and outright theft" and believed the game was a successful tribute, perhaps done "a little too accurately for its own good." The A.V. Club agreed, writing that Inti Creates successfully borrowed Castlevania III concepts and characters but tweaked them "into a form that feels both familiar and modern." They called it a "throwback" to the "moody, trollishly difficult" NES games.

PC Gamer and Nintendo Life wrote that the game stayed closely accurate to the gameplay of the 8-bit Castlevania games, for better or worse. PC Gamer contrasted the game to how Shovel Knight built upon the foundations of classic games, writing that Curse of the Moon "merely walk[s] in the footsteps of those 8-bit favourites [...] those with the deepest affection for retro games are the most likely to find it just a touch too familiar." Graphics wise, critics believed the game was successful at pulling off an 8-bit graphical appearance, though others found inconsistencies. IGN and Nintendo World Report argued that some bosses did not appear to fit the aesthetic. Hardcore Gamer called it "one of the finest 8-bit inspired games on the market."

Journalists believed Curse of the Moon successfully reproduced the feel of the original Castlevania games while also sporting a more modern feel with faster, less rigid movement, and more forgiving gameplay. Game Informer felt the game's adherence to old gaming tropes, such as slow attacks speed and cheap deaths, weakened the experience. The game's variety of options and difficulties was commended as appealing to all types of players looking for both vintage and modern gameplay experiences. Some journalists liked how the variety of characters lent more depth to the gameplay and replay value. Critics felt the game was short, but still fulfilling in its purpose as a companion title and prelude to Ritual of the Night.

=== Sales ===
Within a week of availability, Curse of the Moon sold more than 100,000 copies, with 56% of sales being on the Switch. Almost two-thirds of all platform sales came from North America. By 2020, the game had sold over 600,000 copies, with still more than half of sales for the Switch.

== Sequel ==
A sequel, Bloodstained: Curse of the Moon 2 was announced in June 2020 as part of the New Game Plus Expo, and released for Nintendo Switch, PlayStation 4, Windows, and Xbox One, on July 10, 2020. Zangetsu is still the main player-character, but Curse of the Moon 2 introduces three new companions that can be swapped as in the first game: Dominique, who uses spears; Robert, who uses guns; and Hachi, a corgi who pilots a robot. The sequel maintains the original's multiple difficulty options with both a Casual mode and a Veteran mode available.
