= Dwarfs (video game) =

2011 real-time strategy video game

Dwarfs!?
- Developer: Power of 2
- Publisher: Tripwire Interactive
- Designers: Robin Flodin; Teddy Sjöström
- Programmer: Teddy Sjöström
- Artist: Robin Flodin
- Composer: Christopher Flodin
- Engine: Microsoft XNA
- Platforms: Microsoft Windows, Linux, OS X
- Release: Microsoft Windows; 4 May 2011; Linux, OS X; February 2013
- Genre: Real-time strategy
- Mode: Single-player

Dwarfs!? is a 2011 real-time strategy game developed by Power of 2 and published by Tripwire Interactive. In the game, the player acts as the overseer for an underground Dwarf colony, as the player must defend them by doing things such as building walls, solidifying rock, and bombing holes as they mine for resources. The game features multiple game modes, which range from an arcade mode, where the goal is getting the highest score, to a tower defence mode. Power of 2's Robin Flodin and Teddy Sjöström conceived the game in late 2009 while studying video game design.

== Gameplay ==
Dwarfs!? is a real-time strategy game. The gameplay consists of management of a Dwarf mining colony, where the player must manage the gold collected by miner dwarfs, to draw arrows to guide dwarfs, bomb holes with dynamite to divert water flow, and purchase warriors to fight enemies. There are various monsters such as goblins and spiders, who must be battled with warrior dwarfs that the player can purchase at bases and outposts.

== Development ==
Dwarfs!? was developed by Power of 2, a company composed of Robin Flodin and Teddy Sjöström. Near the end of 2009, while they were studying video game design at the University of Gotland, they conceived the game's concept for a lesson in which they were to create a playable game within a few days. The game Dwarf Fortress was among their inspirations. Flodin and Sjöström additionally acted as the game's artist and programmer, respectively, while Christopher Flodin contributed sound. According to Robin Flodin, Dwarfs!? was initially developed with iOS in mind, but later turned out as a personal computer game. Power of 2 shared an office with Flodin's other venture, Zeal Game Studio, in Visby.

Flodin had been acquainted with Tripwire Interactive, an American video game company, since the latter competed in the 2008 Gotland Game Awards. He pitched Dwarfs!? to the company, which agreed to publish the game in 2010 and subsequently made an agreement to release the game on the Steam storefront. It was the fourth game to be published by Tripwire Interactive, which also provided quality assurance for the game. A beta version of Dwarfs!? was available around August 2010. The full game was released on 4 May 2011 alongside a demo. The Microsoft Windows game was ported to Linux and OS X in February 2013.

== Reception ==
Dwarfs!? won the "Pwnage Award" at the 2010 Gotland Game Awards and was named the "Game of the Year" at the 2010 Swedish Game Awards. Upon release, editors of The A.V. Club praised the game as a "distillation, assembling the best parts of more complex games, and filtering out everything else".

Dwarfs!? sold over 100,000 copies by November 2011 and more than 250,000 by November 2017. The game's success led Paradox Interactive, a Swedish video game publisher, to partner with and invest in Zeal Game Studio, which Flodin had founded in 2011 and ran as chief executive officer. Tripwire Interactive added the "Dwarfs!? Axe" as a weapon to its game Killing Floor in December 2012.
