= Red Orchestra =

Red Orchestra may refer to:

- Red Orchestra (espionage), a name given by the Gestapo to an anti-Nazi resistance movement in Berlin and to Soviet espionage rings in German-occupied Europe and Switzerland during World War II
- Red Orchestra: Combined Arms, a modification of the video games Unreal Tournament 2003 and Unreal Tournament 2004
- Red Orchestra: Ostfront 41-45, a 2006 video game based on Red Orchestra: Combined Arms
- Red Orchestra 2: Heroes of Stalingrad, a 2011 sequel to Red Orchestra: Ostfront 41-45
