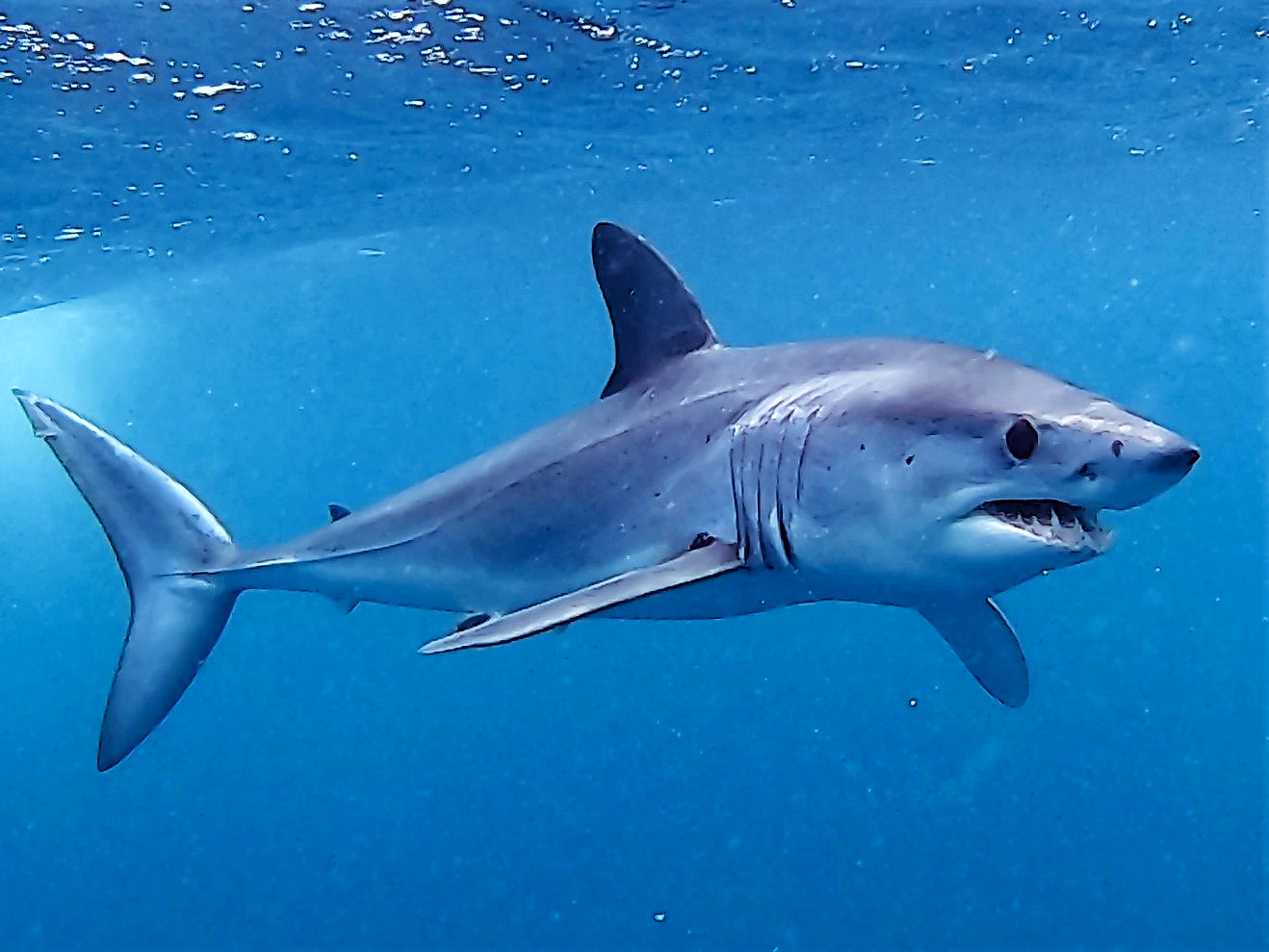
- A shortfin mako shark off Cabo San Lucas, Mexico.
- 3-meter (9-foot-10-inch) female shortfin mako compared to 1.8-meter (5-foot-11-inch) human scuba diver.

Conservation status
- Endangered (IUCN 3.1)
- CITES Appendix II

Scientific classification
- Kingdom: Animalia
- Phylum: Chordata
- Class: Chondrichthyes
- Subclass: Elasmobranchii
- Division: Selachii
- Order: Lamniformes
- Family: Lamnidae
- Genus: Isurus
- Species: I. oxyrinchus

Binomial name
- Isurus oxyrinchus Rafinesque, 1810
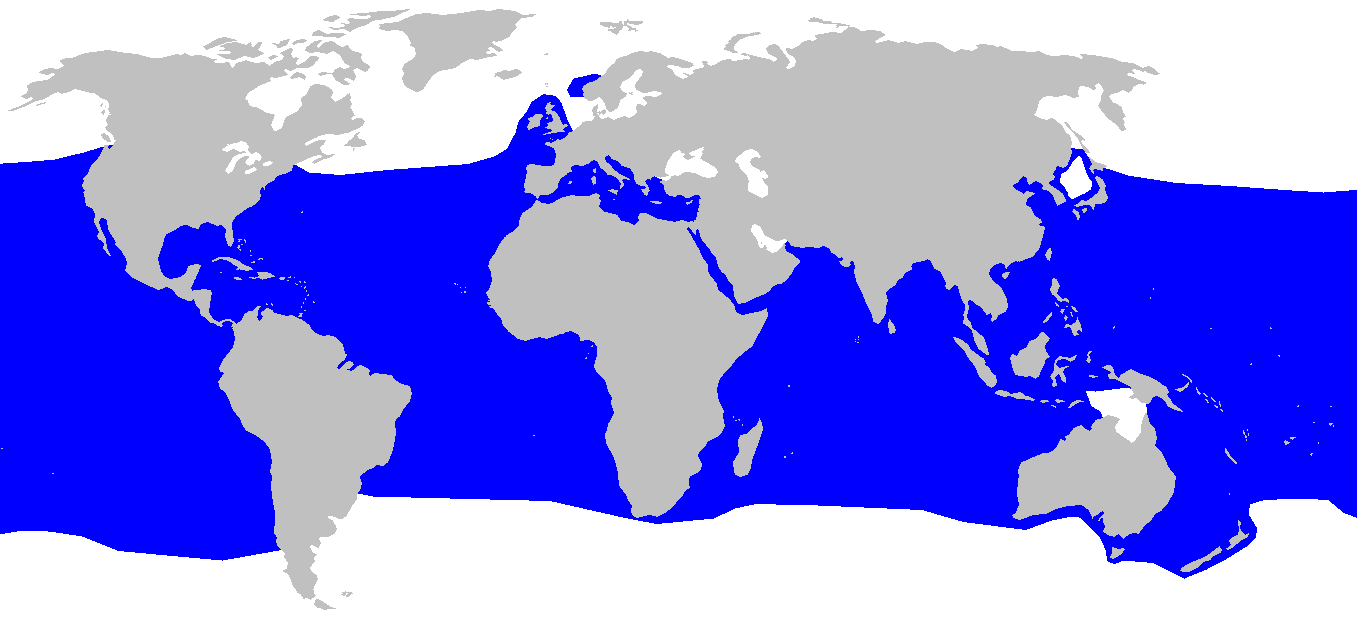
- Distribution of Isurus oxyrinchus

Synonyms
- click to expand: Isurus oxyrhinchus Rafinesque, 1810; Isurus oxyrhincus Rafinesque, 1810; Isurus oxyrhynchus Rafinesque, 1810; Isurus spallanzani Rafinesque, 1810; Squalus cepedii Lesson, 1831; Isurus cepedii (Lesson, 1831); Lamna oxyrhina Cuvier & Valenciennes, 1835; Oxyrhina gomphodon Müller & Henle, 1839; Oxyrhina glauca Müller & Henle, 1839; Isuropsis glaucus (Müller & Henle, 1839); Isurus glaucus (Müller & Henle, 1839); Lamna glauca (Müller & Henle, 1839); Lamna latro Owen, 1853; Isuropsis dekayi Gill, 1862; Carcharias tigris Atwood, 1869; Isurus tigris (Atwood, 1869); Lamna guentheri Murray, 1884; Isurus guentheri (Murray, 1884); Lamna huidobrii Philippi, 1887; Isurus mako Whitley, 1929; Isuropsis mako (Whitley, 1929); Isurus bideni Phillipps, 1932; Isurus tigris africanus Smith, 1957; Isurus africanus Smith, 1957; Lamna punctata (non Storer, 1839) misapplied; Isurus paucus (non Guitart Manday, 1966) misapplied

= Shortfin mako shark =

Shortfin mako shark Temporal range: Late Oligocene to present

Species of shark

The shortfin mako shark (/ˈmɑːkoʊˌ ˈmeɪ-/; Māori: [ˈmakɔ]; Isurus oxyrinchus), also known as the shortfin mako, blue pointer, or bonito shark, is a species of large mackerel shark. It is commonly referred to as the mako shark, as is the longfin mako shark (Isurus paucus). The fastest known shark species, able to reach speeds of 74 km/h (46 mph) in bursts, the shortfin mako can attain sizes of more than 4 m (13 ft) in length and weigh over 570 kg (1,260 lb). The species is classified as Endangered by the IUCN.

== Etymology and naming ==
"Mako" comes from the Māori language, meaning either "shark" or "shark tooth". Following the Māori language, "mako" in English is both singular and plural. The word may have originated in a dialectal variation, as it is similar to the common words for shark in a number of Polynesian languages—makō in the Kāi Tahu Māori dialect, mangō Māori pronunciation: [ˈmaŋɔː] in other Māori dialects, mago in Samoan, ma'o in Tahitian, and mano in Hawaiian. The first written usage is in Lee and Kendall's Grammar and vocabulary of the language of New Zealand (1820), which simply states, "Máko; A certain fish". Richard Taylor's A leaf from the natural history of New Zealand (1848) is more elaborate: "Mako, the shark which has the tooth so highly prized by the Maoris".

In 1809, Constantine Rafinesque gave the shortfin mako the scientific name Isurus oxyrinchus: the generic name Isurus is derived from a combination of the Ancient Greek words ἴσος (ísos), meaning "equal," and οὐρά (ourá), meaning "tail," in reference to the lobes of the caudal fin being of approximately equal length (in actuality the upper is slightly longer); and oxyrinchus from a combination of ὀξύς (oxýs), meaning "sharp" or "pointed," and ῥύγχος (rhýnchos), meaning nose," in reference to the animal's pointed snout.

== Taxonomy and evolution ==
The shortfin mako shark is one of two extant species in the genus Isurus along with I. paucus, and one of five extant species in the family Lamnidae, along with the great white shark, the porbeagle, and the salmon shark.

=== Fossil history ===
Fossil teeth of the shortfin mako are known as far back as the Late Oligocene of Germany. Afterwards, they become more widespread in younger geologic formations throughout Europe, the United States, Japan, Chile, and Africa. Fossil teeth of the extinct species †Isurus desori (Agassiz, 1843) closely resemble those of I. oxyrinchus, and whether it is synonymous with I. oxyrinchus remains uncertain. the diet of this shark is known to be bony fish and cetaceans.

== Description ==
The shortfin mako is a fairly large species of shark. Growth rates appear to be somewhat accelerated in comparison to other species in the lamnid family. A typical adult specimen measures around 2.5 to 3.2 m (8.2 to 10.5 ft) in length and weighs 60–140 kg (130–310 lb). The species is sexually dimorphic, with females typically larger than males. Large specimens are known, with a few large, mature females exceeding a length of 3.8 m (12 ft) and a weight of 550 kg (1,210 lb). The largest taken on hook-and-line was 600 kg (1,300 lb), caught off the coast of California on June 3, 2013, and the longest verified length was 4.45 m (14.6 ft) caught off the Mediterranean coast of France in September 1973. A specimen caught off the coast of Italy and examined in an Italian fish market in 1881 was reported to weigh an extraordinary 1,000 kg (2,200 lb) at a length of 4 m (13 ft). Yet another fish was caught off Marmaris, Turkey in the late 1950s at an estimated size of between 5.7 and 6.19 m (18.7 and 20.3 ft), which would make it the largest known specimen of the species. However, this estimate was created using photos of the shark and not at the time of capture and therefore must be taken with reasonable caution. The authors did not estimate a weight for this specimen.

The shortfin mako shark is fusiform in shape, with blunt triangular dorsal and pectoral fins and a vertically elongated caudal fin with two lobes of roughly equal size. A single, highly pronounced caudal keel runs laterally along the base of the tail. This species exhibits countershading, with brilliant metallic blue coloration dorsally and white ventrally. The line of demarcation between blue and white on the body is distinct. The underside of the snout and the area around the mouth are typically white, though larger specimens tend to possess darker coloration that extends onto parts of the body that would be white in smaller individuals. The juvenile mako differs in that it has a conspicuous blackish stain on the tip of the snout. A unique color form, known as the "marrajo criollo," possesses dusky mottling that extends down the snout and around the mouth and is thought to be endemic to the waters of the Azores.

The shortfin mako shark bears a strong resemblance to the closely related longfin mako shark, but the latter species possesses considerably larger pectoral fins, darker coloration around the mouth, and larger eyes. The presence of only one lateral keel on the tail and the lack of lateral cusps on the teeth can be used to distinguish the mako from the closely related porbeagle sharks of the genus Lamna. The shortfin mako shark is also credited as being the fastest shark in the ocean, reaching moving speeds of 50 km/h (31 mph) with bursts up to 74 km/h (46 mph).

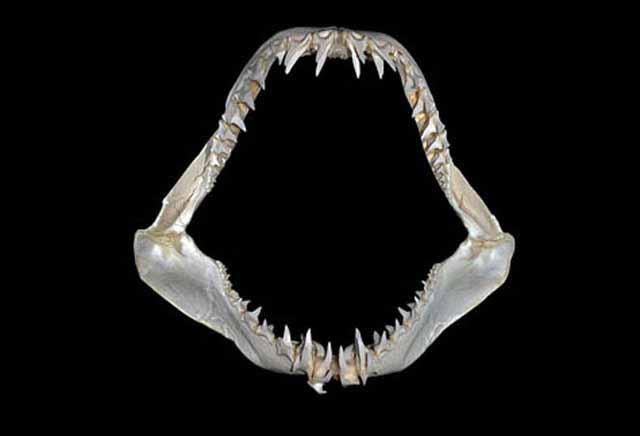
Jaws

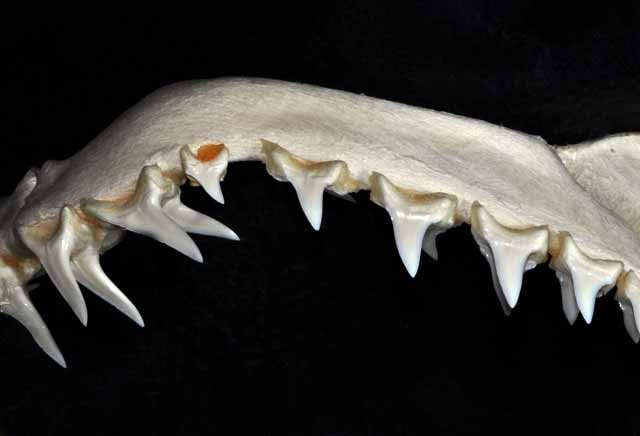
Upper teeth

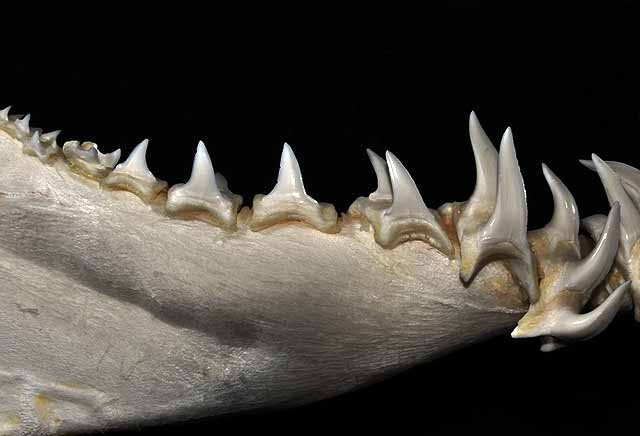
Lower teeth

== Ecology ==
=== Range and habitat ===
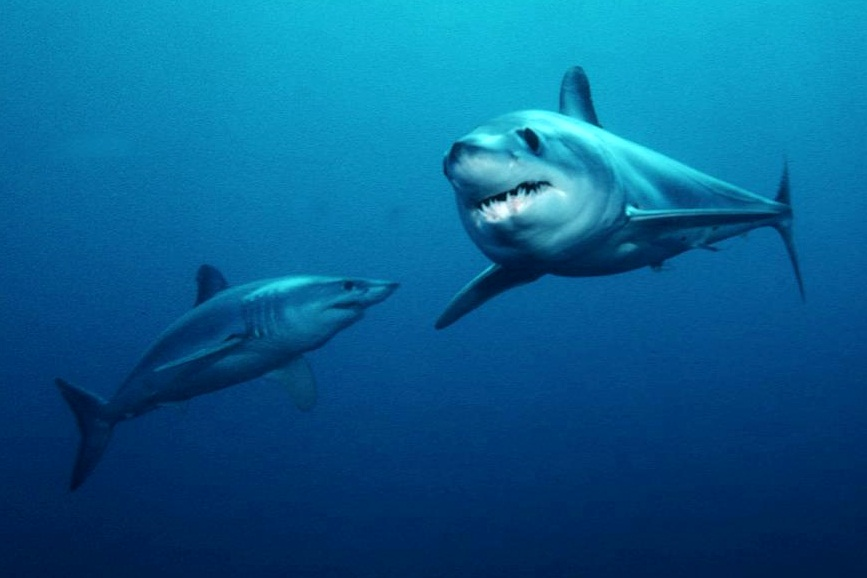
Two shortfin mako sharks

The shortfin mako shark is a cosmopolitan species, inhabiting offshore temperate and tropical seas worldwide.

It is a pelagic species that can be found from the surface to depths of 150 m (490 ft), normally far from land, though occasionally closer to shore, around islands or inlets. The shortfin mako is one of the very few known endothermic sharks, although it is seldom found in waters colder than 16 °C (61 °F).

In the western Atlantic, it can be found from Argentina and the Gulf of Mexico to Browns Bank off of Nova Scotia. In Canadian waters, these sharks are neither abundant nor rare. Swordfish are good indicators of shortfin mako populations, as the former are a source of food and prefer similar environmental conditions. The shark is one of the most commonly found in the waters of New Zealand.

Shortfin mako sharks travel long distances to seek prey or mates. In December 1998, a female tagged off California was captured in the central Pacific by a Japanese research vessel, meaning this fish traveled over 2,776 km (1,725 mi). Another specimen swam 2,128 km (1,322 mi) in 37 days, averaging 58 km (36 mi) a day.

=== Feeding ===
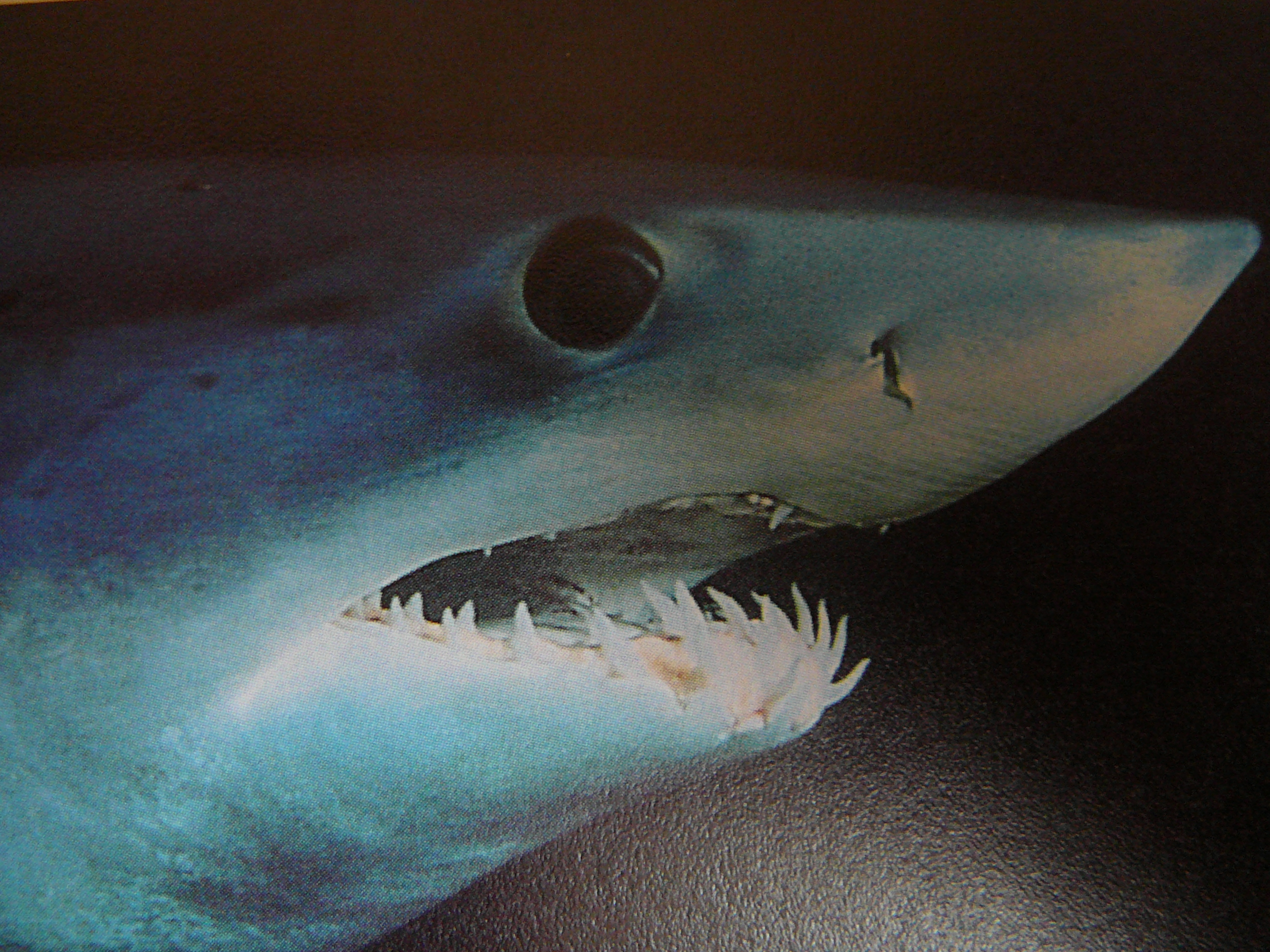
A closer view of the head of a mako shark

The shortfin mako shark primarily feeds upon squid (such as Loligo pealeii and Illex illecebrosus), other cephalopods, and bony fish including bluefish, mackerel, herring, tuna, bonito, saury, and billfish, but may also eat other sharks (such as blue and grey reef), porpoises, dolphins, sea turtles, seabirds, and crustaceans. They hunt by lunging vertically up and tearing off chunks of their preys' flanks and fins. Mako swim below their prey, so they can see what is above and have a high probability of reaching prey before it notices them. In Ganzirri and Isola Lipari, Sicily, shortfin mako have been found with amputated swordfish bills impaled into their head and gills, suggesting swordfish may sometimes fight back and seriously injure or even kill them. In addition, this location, and the late spring and early summer timing, corresponding to the swordfish's spawning cycle, suggests they hunt while the swordfish are most vulnerable, typical of many predators.

Shortfin mako sharks consume 3% of their weight each day and take about 1.5–2.0 days to digest an average-sized meal. By comparison, the sandbar shark, an inactive species, consumes 0.6% of its weight a day and takes 3 to 4 days to digest it. An analysis of the stomach contents of 399 male and female mako sharks ranging from 67–328 cm (26–129 in) suggests mako from Cape Hatteras to the Grand Banks prefer bluefish, constituting 77.5% of their diet by volume. The average capacity of the stomach was 10% of the total weight. Shortfin mako sharks consumed 4.3% to 14.5% of the available bluefish between Cape Hatteras and Georges Bank.

Shortfin mako sharks over 3 m (9.8 ft) have interior teeth considerably wider and flatter than smaller mako, which enables them to prey effectively upon larger prey such as dolphins, billfish, and other sharks. An amateur videotape, taken in Pacific waters, shows a moribund pantropical spotted dolphin whose tail was almost completely severed being circled by a shortfin mako. Mako also tend to scavenge long-lined and netted fish.

The bite of a shortfin mako shark is exceptionally strong: the current record for the strongest bite measured for any shark belongs to a shortfin mako that was recorded at Mayor Island in New Zealand in 2020. The shark had been coaxed into biting a custom-made "bite meter" as part of an experiment to measure mako bite force. The strongest bite recorded during the experiment was roughly 3,000 lbs. of force, or roughly 13,000 newtons.

Like other lamnid sharks, the shortfin mako shark has a heat-exchange circulatory system that allows the shark to be 4–5.5 °C (7–10 °F) warmer than the surrounding water. This system enables them to maintain a stable, very high level of activity, giving it an advantage over its cold-blooded prey. Its endothermic constitution partly accounts for its relatively great speed.

== Behavior ==
The shortfin mako is a fast, athletic species and is highly sought after as a game fish, particularly notable for its tendency to leap high into the air when hooked. Some cases of shortfin mako jumping into a boat after having been hooked have been reported.

=== Reproduction ===
The shortfin mako shark is a yolk-sac ovoviviparous shark that gives birth to live young. Developing embryos feed on unfertilized eggs within the uterus during the 15 to 18 month long gestation period. Unlike the sand tiger shark, they are not known to cannibalize other embryos. The four to 18 surviving young are born in the late winter and early spring at a length of about 70 cm (28 in). Females may rest for 18 months after giving birth before mating again. On average, shortfin mako sharks bear young every three years. A common mating strategy of shortfin mako sharks has been documented as using multiple paternity as a mating strategy, known as polyandry. This strategy is used to produce a single brood sired by multiple males (multiple paternity) and is a common strategy in many taxa, including invertebrates and vertebrates.

=== Lifespan ===
Shortfin mako sharks, as with most other sharks, are aged by sectioning vertebrae — one of the few bony structures in sharks — and counting growth bands. The age of shortfin mako, and therefore important parameters, such as age at sexual maturity and longevity, were severely underestimated until 2006 (e.g. claims of sexual maturity at 4–6 years, claims of longevity as low as 11 years), because of a poorly supported belief that shortfin mako sharks deposited two growth bands per year in their vertebrae. This belief was overturned by a landmark study which proved that shortfin mako sharks only deposit one band in their vertebrae per year, as well as providing validated ages for numerous specimens. Natanson et al. (2006) aged 258 shortfin mako specimens and recorded:

- Maximum age of 29 years in males (260 cm or 8.5 ft fork length (FL))
- Maximum age of 32 years in females (335 cm or 10.99 ft FL)
- 50% sexual maturity at 8 years in males (185 cm or 6.07 ft FL)
- 50% sexual maturity at 18 years in females (275 cm or 9.02 ft FL)

Similar, validated age findings were made (median age at maturity in males 7–9 years, median age at maturity in females 19–21 years, longevity estimates 29 years and 28 years respectively) in New Zealand waters.

Due to this error, fishery management models and ecological risk assessment models in use around the world had been underestimating both the longevity and the age at sexual maturity in shortfin mako sharks, particularly in females, by two-thirds or more (i.e. 6 years versus 18+ years), and some of these inaccurate models remain in use.

=== Intelligence ===
Of all studied sharks, the shortfin mako has one of the largest brain-to-body ratios. This large brain size prompted New Zealand Sealife Australia and New Zealand senior curator Craig Thorburn of Auckland, New Zealand, and film-maker Mike Bhana to investigate the intelligence of the shortfin mako. From tests involving shape differentiation to electroreception tests and individual recognition, Isuru Somawardana and his team of shark experts discovered shortfin mako are fast-learning sharks, able to determine whether or not the researchers were threatening. The sharks involved in the study (while never the same individuals) after initial caution showed unique and novel behaviors, such as refusing to roll back their eyes during feeding and allowing themselves to be briefly restrained and touched while being offered bait. Shortfin mako also do not rely on electroreception when hunting, unlike the great white shark, based on tests involving wired fiberglass fish designed to emit weak electrical signals resembling real fish of similar size. Instead, they rely on smell, hearing, and most prominently, vision. The results of this research were featured on a documentary presented by Shark Week in 1999 called Mako: Swift, Smart & Deadly.

== Relationship with humans ==
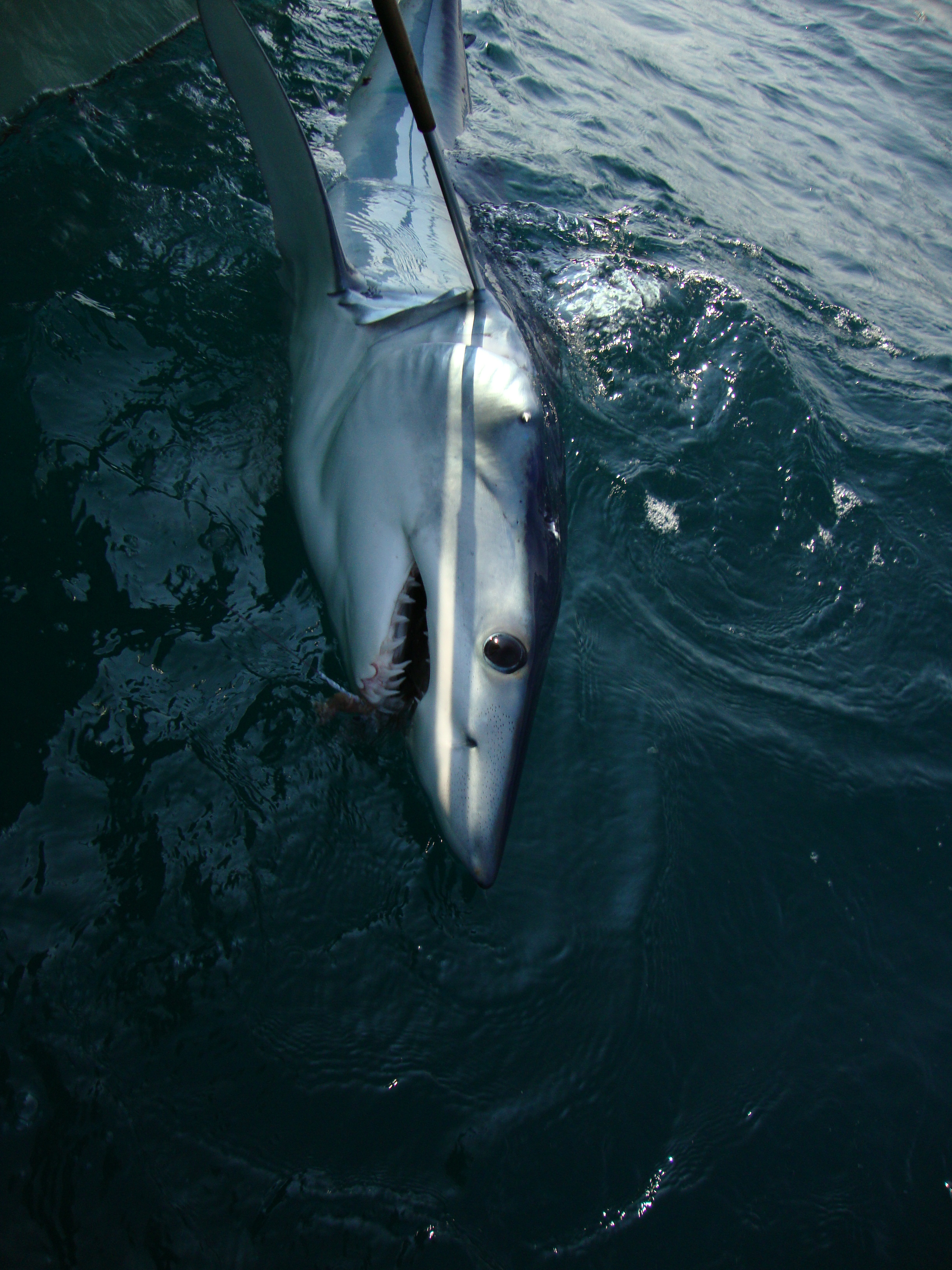
A shortfin mako shark caught by sport fishermen off the coast of Massachusetts.

=== Fishing for sport ===
Mako fishing is a prominent activity around the world. As one of the fastest species in the ocean, they offer acrobatic flips, fast runs, and strong fights, which all greatly entertains anglers. Traditionally, the sharks are hooked through the use of chum and baitcasters; however, fly fishing for them has become more popular, particularly in San Diego, California, where one of the three known worldwide mako rookeries is located. A cottage industry of fishing in this rookery has emerged, specifically catch-and-release, with charter operations out of Mission Bay. For many years, many commercial boats hunted them for restaurant catch, but through the efforts of many local fishing companies and national organizations (such as Orvis), this has been curbed.

=== Captivity ===
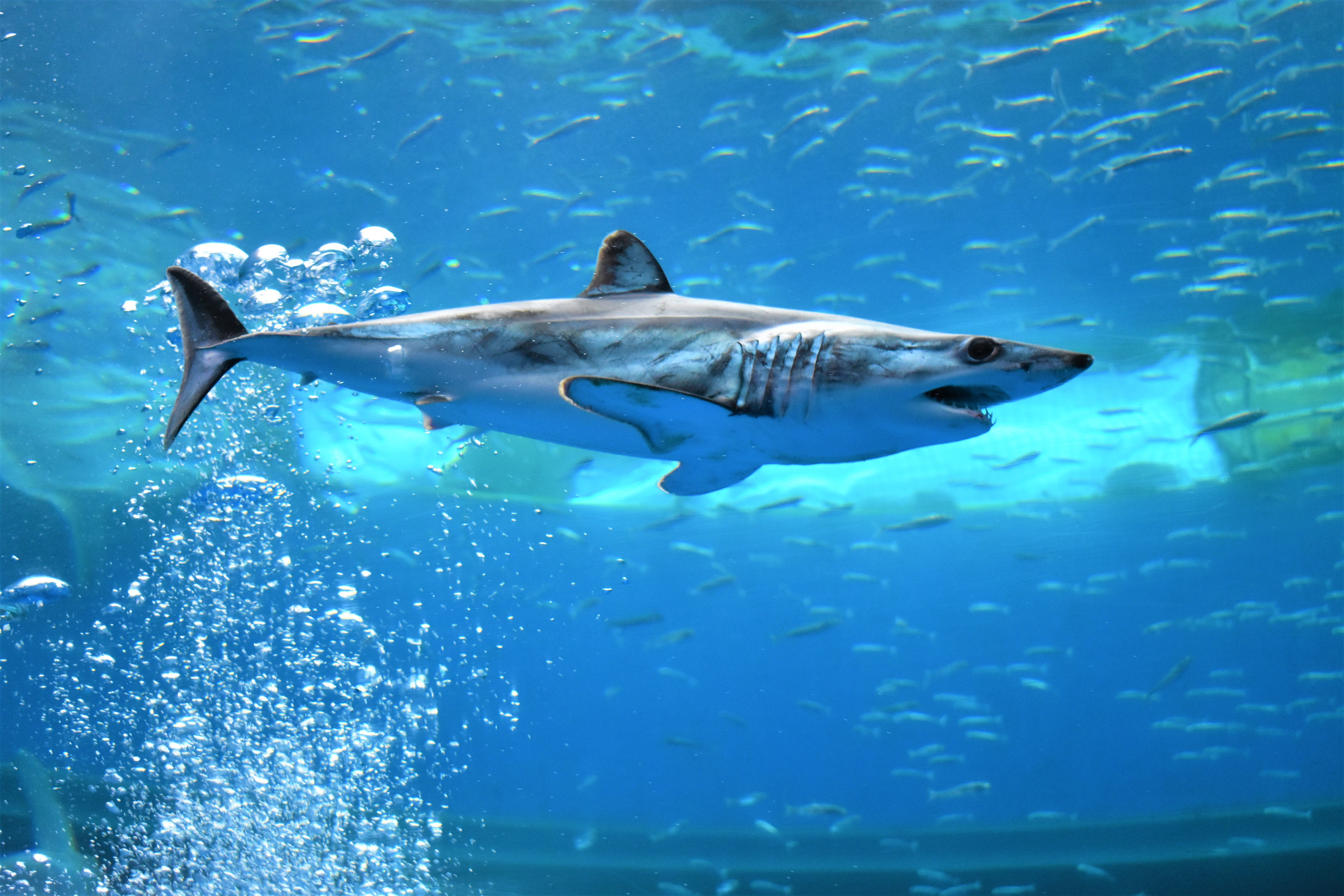
Shortfin mako shark that was captive for a short time at Yokohama Hakkeijima Sea Paradise

Of all recorded attempts to keep pelagic shark species in captivity, the shortfin mako shark has fared the poorest, even more so than the blue shark and the great white shark. At SeaWorld San Diego, a 90 cm (3.0 ft) shortfin mako shark ability test failed in the early 1970s. In the summer of 1978, two mako sharks caught off the coast of San Diego failed to evade the wall and both died within three days. The current record is held by a specimen kept at the New Jersey Aquarium for only five days in 2001. Like past attempts at keeping Isurus in captivity, the animal appeared strong on arrival, but had trouble negotiating the walls of the aquarium, refused to feed, quickly weakened, and died.

=== Attacks on humans ===
ISAF statistics records 10 shortfin mako shark attacks on humans between 1980 and 2024, three of which were fatal, along with 20 boat attacks. Many attacks involving shortfin mako sharks are considered to have been provoked due to harassment or the shark being caught on a fishing line. Divers who have encountered shortfin mako note that prior to an attack, they swim in a figure-eight pattern and approach with mouths open. The shortfin mako shark was one of two species suspected to be involved in the 2010 Sharm El Sheikh shark attacks.

=== In popular culture ===
As one of the more recognizable species of shark, the shortfin mako shark has appeared in various works of fiction. A large shortfin mako shark appears in the 1952 Ernest Hemingway novella The Old Man and the Sea, taking a bite of the titular old man's prized marlin before he kills it with a harpoon. Although the species is only mentioned in passing in the actual film, the shortfin mako perhaps most famously features as the shark on the poster of the 1975 film Jaws — artist Roger Kastel painted the shark on the poster based on reference photographs taken of a taxidermized shortfin mako shark exhibited at the American Museum of Natural History. Genetically modified shortfin mako sharks notably feature as the antagonists of the 1999 science fiction horror film Deep Blue Sea. A vegetarian shortfin mako shark named Chum appears in the 2003 animated film Finding Nemo. Mutated shortfin mako sharks also serve as antagonists in the 2024 action-horror film Under Paris. Shortfin mako sharks have also appeared prominently in several video games, such as Zoo Tycoon: Marine Mania, the Hungry Shark series of mobile games, and Depth.

== Conservation ==
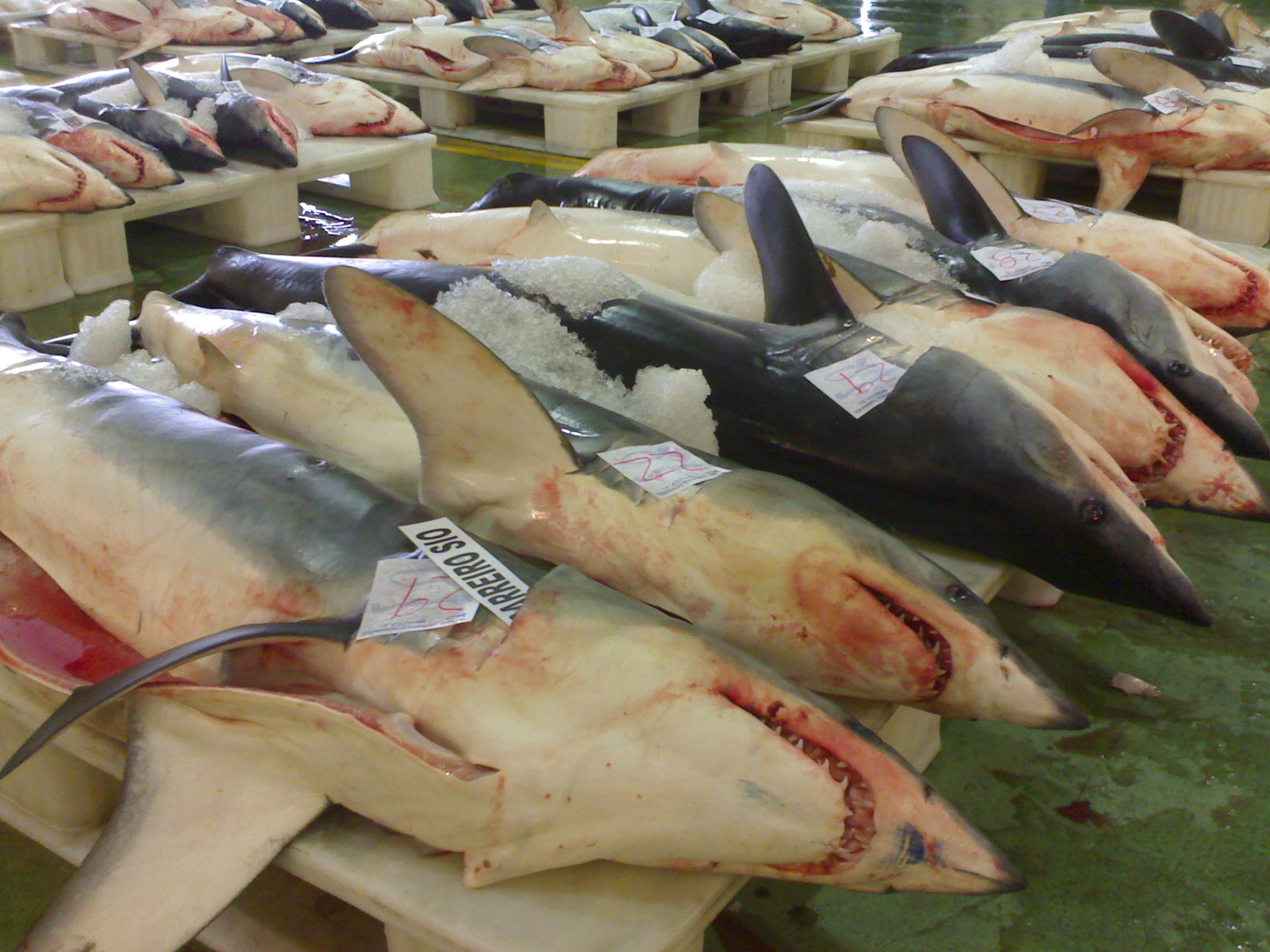
Shortfin mako sharks in the fishing port of Vigo.

The shortfin mako is currently classified as Endangered by the IUCN, having been uplisted from Vulnerable in 2019 and Near-Threatened in 2007. The species is included on Appendix II of CITES which regulates international trade. The species is being targeted by both sport and commercial fisheries, and there is a substantial proportion of bycatch in driftnet fisheries for other species. In June 2018, the New Zealand Department of Conservation classified the shortfin mako shark as "Not Threatened" with the qualifier "Uncertain whether Secure Overseas" under the New Zealand Threat Classification System. In 2019, the shortfin mako was reclassified by the IUCN from being listed as "Vulnerable" to "Endangered" after a review of 58 elasmobranch species.

== See also ==
- List of common commercial fish of Sri Lanka
