= Make Something Unreal =

Video game development competition series

Make Something Unreal, also known as $1,000,000 Make Something Unreal Contest and Make Something Unreal Live, was a series of video game development competitions organised by Epic Games which began in 2004, with subsequent competitions in 2008, 2012, and 2013. The contests aimed to reward developers who created mods using the Unreal game engine. Make Something Unreal has not returned since the event in 2013. Epic Games has since launched Epic MegaGrants, a grant based scheme, in 2019.

The competition partnered with companies such as Nvidia and Intel and provided competition winners with Unreal Engine licenses, cash prizes, and PC hardware. Notable games in the competition included Red Orchestra: Combined Arms, Angels Fall First: Planetstorm and Antichamber.

== Grand prize winners ==
Year	Development team	Game	Grand prize
2004	Tripwire Interactive	Red Orchestra: Combined Arms	US$50,000, Unreal Engine 3 license
2008	Michael Hegemann and Team	The Haunted	US$50,000, Unreal Engine 3 license
2012	Commander Kiwi	Warlock of Firetop Mountain: Lost Chapters	Unreal Engine 3 license, iOS App Store game release
2013	Dead Shark Triplepunch	Epigenesis	Unreal Engine 3 & Unreal Engine 4 licenses

== $1,000,000 Make Something Unreal Contest (2004) ==
Logo of the 2004 contest

The first competition, titled $1,000,000 Make Something Unreal Contest, was held in 2004 in partnership with Nvidia, Digital Extremes, and Atari It was described as "a way to reward a growing community of gamers that are helping to spark the evolution of 3D entertainment". The grand prize was US$50,000 and an Unreal Engine 3 license. Additionally, US$300,000 worth of computers were awarded, including 50 computers for schools whose students or faculty submitted an entry to the competition.

During the contest one thousand entrants submitted mods for Unreal Tournament 2003 and Unreal Tournament 2004 across 13 categories. Qualifying entries were required to be freely available for download. The competition was held in three phases, and grand winners were announced at the Game Developers Conference.

The grand prize for best mod was awarded to World War II shooter Red Orchestra, developed by Tripwire Interactive, who earned nearly US$80,000 in cash and computer hardware prizes over the course of the contest. Tripwire Interactive cite the Make Something Unreal contest as the reason the studio exists. Friedrich Kirschner won US$25,000 in the Best Non-Interactive Real Time Movie category for a short film titled The Journey.

Following the competition, Mark Rein, vice president of Epic Games, stated that "The ultimate beneficiaries were... the game industry as a whole which uncovered some incredibly talented people who will continue to make contributions to the industry for many years to come."

== $1,000,000 Intel Make Something Unreal Contest (2008) ==
In 2008 Epic Games announced the continuation of the Make Something Unreal contest in partnership with Intel. This competition would again be an opportunity for aspiring video game developers to submit mods using Unreal Engine 3, this time for Unreal Tournament 3. Phase One winners were announced in September 2008, with some cash and hardware prizes awarded, including high performance PCs. Of the first phase contestants, Mark Rein said Epic Games had "been blown away by the quality and variety of the mods submitted".

Phase Two winners were announced in February 2009, with a total of US$70,000 cash awarded across all winners. The Phase 2 winning mods were showcased at the 2009 Game Developers Conference in San Francisco. In August 2009 Phase 3 winners were announced, with prizes amounting to around US$100,000 in cash and hardware.

The overall winners of Make Something Unreal 2008 were announced in February 2010, with horror shooter The Haunted taking the first place prize of US$50,000 and an Unreal Engine 3 license due to "a winning formula of intense survival horror gameplay, rich multiplayer modes, and nightmarish themed graphics." The Ball placed second, Angels Fall First: Planetstorm third, Prometheus fourth, and Hazard: The Journey of Life (later known as Antichamber) placed fifth, receiving US$40,000, $30,000, $20,000, and $10,000 respectively.

== Make Something Unreal Live 2012 ==
In November 2011, it was announced that Epic Games would be hosting another Make Something Unreal contest in conjunction with Train2Game, a distance learning resource for game development. This competition required teams to develop a game for the iOS platform using the Unreal Development Kit – the free version of Unreal Engine 3. The competition began with a two-day game jam in which ten teams had to create a game based on the theme of Guy Fawkes. The top three teams, and a fourth comprising the most talented developers from other teams, were chosen to take part in the main event at Gadget Show Live in April 2012.

The chosen teams were required to spend the six months prior to Gadget Show Live developing games, based on roleplay gamebooks Fighting Fantasy, until a final two-day event at the live show, where they received guidance from developers such as Cliff Bleszinski, Jon Hare, and Peter Molyneux. Large screens were displayed to the public viewing the event with the aim of giving them an insight in the game development.

Development team Commander Kiwi won the 2012 contest with their fantasy RPG game Warlock of Firetop Mountain: Lost Chapters, winning them a full commercial license for Unreal Engine 3. All four of the finalists' games were released on the iOS App Store following Gadget Show Live.

== Make Something Unreal Live 2013 ==
In-game screenshot of 2013 winning game Epigenesis

Make Something Unreal Live continued in 2013, with a new competition being announced in October 2012. The competition was open to students who were tasked with making pitches for a PC game using the Unreal Development Kit based on the theme 'mendelian genetics'. Finalists for the competition were chosen in November, with 12 teams progressing to the next round where they were required to present works in progress, made using Unreal Engine 3, to a judging panel, who would then choose four teams to compete at Gadget Show Live 2013.

A panel of judges, including senior personnel from Epic Games, chose four teams to progress to the final, stating that they were "hugely impressed by the quality of all 12 shortlisted entries to this year’s competition." At Gadget Show Live 2013 a similar format to 2012 was followed, with judges including Peter Molyneux and BioWare producer Mike Gamble. Dead Shark Triplepunch's first-person ball game Epigenesis won first place at the competition, winning the team a commercial license for Unreal Engine 3 and Unreal Engine 4, with second place awarding Kairo Games' Polymorph with an Unreal Engine 3 license. Judges described the winning game as a "potential eSport."

MSUL 2013 was also supported by Staffordshire University, Epic's educational partner for the program, and UKIE, the games industry trade association.
