= Killing Floor 2 =

2016 first-person shooter video game

- Developers: Tripwire Interactive; Hardsuit Labs; Saber Interactive
- Publisher: Tripwire Interactive
- Directors: William T. Munk II; David Hensley
- Producers: Al Nelson; Jimi Doss
- Designers: Joelle Silverio; Lee Hammock; John Gibson
- Programmer: Andrew Ladenberger
- Artist: David Hensley
- Writers: Alan Wilson; Marek Walton; Maurice Suckling
- Composer: zYnthetic
- Engine: Unreal Engine 3
- Platforms: Microsoft Windows; PlayStation 4 Xbox One
- Release: Microsoft Windows, PlayStation 4; November 18, 2016; Xbox One; August 28, 2017
- Genres: First-person shooter, survival horror
- Modes: Single-player, multiplayer

Killing Floor 2 is a first-person shooter video game developed and published by Tripwire Interactive, with later support from Saber Interactive. It is a sequel to 2009's Killing Floor. An early access version of the game was released for Microsoft Windows in April 2015, and the game was released in November 2016 for Windows and PlayStation 4 and August 2017 for Xbox One. The game utilizes Epic Games' Unreal Engine 3. A sequel, Killing Floor 3, was released in July 2025.

== Gameplay ==
The player running into a group of Bloats

Killing Floor 2 is a first-person shooter video game that can be played alone or cooperatively with up to six players. The game is based on events from Killing Floor, in which bio-tech firm Horzine attempted to create military clones and was hijacked by an insane researcher who unleashed the clones across the UK. The clones have now rapidly spread across Europe, paralyzing the response from the European Union. In Killing Floor 2, taking place a month after the first game, the outbreak has spread beyond Europe, causing governments to collapse and communication systems to fail.

Gameplay consists of players fighting through waves of zombie-like specimens, known as 'Zeds'. As waves pass, the enemy count will increase; different enemy types are introduced as players complete each wave, culminating to a boss fight as the final wave. Enemy count is determined by the number of players in the game. The boss character is determined randomly upon the start of the last wave, and each boss is defeated differently. Players equip themselves with melee weapons and firearms, a healing syringe, and a welder used to block passages. Random weapons, ammo, and armor can be found by exploring the level, though players have a limited amount of weight they can carry.

When players kill a Zed, they earn in-game money and experience points. Achieving certain types of kills, such as a head shot, may cause the game to enter "zed time," when all game actions for all players are slowed down for a few seconds, providing more time for players to adjust their decisions amid battle. Once they spawn, Zeds chase and attack players automatically. When damaged, players can restore their health using a medical syringe on themselves or having a teammate use theirs, among other regenerative items. Once a player's health reaches zero, they will die and will not respawn until the end of the wave. The mission will fail if all players die before completing a wave. Players gain monetary bonus for surviving a round, which they can use to buy and/or sell body armor, ammo, and weapons at a store, also known as the Trader. The Trader is only open for a limited time between waves and in certain locations around the map. The number of waves in a match can be configured, and four difficulty levels are available: Normal, Hard, Suicidal, and Hell on Earth (ordered in increasing difficulty). A patch released in early 2016 included a dynamic difficulty option in which a computer-based "Game Controller" can alter the strength of subsequent waves, either making them easier or harder based on the players' performance.

Prior to starting a match, the player selects one of several perks (or classes) that represent basic combat classes (e.g. Field Medic, Commando, Support). Each perk has various skill boosts (e.g. better damage with specific weapons, healing other characters, welding doors more effectively) that are unavailable to other perks. In the meta-game, players earn experience points for each of their perks by doing actions related to those perks, for example, healing other players will gain Field Medic experience points. The player can also acquire those same experience points when they are not using the appropriate perk. Experience points are most easily earned by using weapons specific to the class, such as explosive weapons for the Demolitions class. Each level gained boosts the perk's base skill numbers. For every five levels gained, the player is able to select one of two specific skills unlocked for the respective perk. These skills include a mix of passive and active abilities, including some that can benefit other team members. Players can also configure their playable character through a number of pre-made personas and options for various clothing and accessories, but these customizations are purely cosmetic with no impact on gameplay mechanics.

In April 2016, a patch added a player-vs-player mode in which one or more players take on the role of a Zed to kill the mercenary players. The Zed abilities are implemented in game, such as a Stalker remaining invisible while not charging.

== Development ==
Killing Floor 2 was developed by Tripwire Interactive, who began work following the release of their 2011 video game Red Orchestra 2: Heroes of Stalingrad. The game was announced for Microsoft Windows and Linux by PC Gamer on May 8, 2014. Tripwire president John Gibson stated Killing Floor 2 is the first time they had been able to develop a game with what he thought was a reasonable team size and budget. The original Killing Floor was ported by ten people in a three-month period; by 2014 the studio had expanded to a team of fifty employees. The game was developed using heavily modified Unreal Engine 3. The developers considered using Unreal Engine 4 but decided against it as they didn't want to scrap their current work in progress and because of concerns that the game might not scale down to run on lower-end computers. The team launched the game on Steam's Early Access program to get feedback from players on weapon and perk balance.

The increased budget meant this was the first project where Tripwire could use motion capture. Motion capture was recorded in San Diego at Sony Computer Entertainment's motion capture studio and the process was used for creature animations and weapon animations in both first- and third-person perspectives. This allowed them to record high frame rate weapon animations for additional detail and fidelity in Zed Time, a slow motion mechanic used in the series. The team aimed to design guns that feel realistic but capture the authenticity of games they had previously developed. They researched firearm speed reloading to create multiple reload animations, and matched the rate of fire of the game guns to their real life counterparts.

Three focal points of the game's initial design were bullets, blades, and blood. These pillars lead to the creation of the M.E.A.T. (massive evisceration and trauma) system to depict dynamic gore and detailed graphic violence. Art and creative directors, David Hensley and Bill Munk both cited Soldier of Fortune's GHOUL system as an inspiration for the M.E.A.T. system employed by Tripwire. Bloodstains are a permanent fixture on maps in Killing Floor 2. Instead of the blood being rendered as a texture that is projected onto objects in the world, they created a system which, in real-time, modifies splatter map textures covering the map to display blood with little rendering overhead. In the original Killing Floor each of the enemy specimens had five individual points of dismemberment; in Killing Floor 2 this number of points has been increased to twenty-two to provide substantially more variety in the dismemberment animations. In Zed time, all colors except red become desaturated to enhance the visuals of the blood and gore.

The game also features dynamic and destructible lights and other breakable objects, which didn't exist in the first game. The melee combat has been revamped with the addition of a blocking mechanism; attack motions are now dictated by the player character's direction of movement. Tripwire are also introducing a new perk progression system, that allows for more customization. To alleviate the perk levelling grind from the first game, the number of levels has been increased drastically to allow players to level up more regularly. Each perk now has configurable skills along with passive bonuses. Tripwire are planning to implement support for Steam Workshop and release a software development kit to allow for extensive modding. The game's soundtrack features a mix of original compositions and licensed rock and metal tracks.

A PlayStation 4 version was announced at the PlayStation Experience on December 6, 2014. Gibson addressed concerns from players of the Windows version, and reassured them that it would not compromise the experience.

In November 2015, Tripwire added a in-game store to allow players to purchase cosmetic items for their characters via microtransactions that otherwise had no effect on gameplay. Many players expressed concern with this addition, as the game at this point had not left Early Access, and that a similar situation had recently occurred with Payday 2 by Overkill Software where the addition of micropayment-based content was met with harsh feedback. Tripwire replied to its player base that the decision to add this feature now was to get feedback to make the transition from early access to a final release seamless, and that while it also added new content such as new weapons, these are treated as shared content that all players on the same server would enjoy. In March 2016, Tripwire updated the game on PCs to include support for Steam Workshop support, allowing users to provide their own maps, weapons, character models, and other modifications.

The game was released on 18 November 2016 for Windows, and PlayStation 4.

Tripwire has continued develop of the game over the last several years, and in December 2019, announced that Saber Interactive will begin supporting development in 2020 as part of their long-term roadmap for the game.

=== Music ===
The soundtrack for Killing Floor 2 was released by Solid State Records on April 21, 2015. It features original compositions by zYnthetic as well as metal tracks from a variety of artists.

Jørn Tillnes of Soundtrack Geek gave the soundtrack a 9/10 and stated that it was "a very cool and different kind of score. There's no orchestral or epic moment here, just pure industrial metal. It's not great all the time, but you can't beat the feeling you get when listening to this. It's a score that's dying to be put inside a cool game which I think Killing Floor 2 is."

== Release ==
Following PC Gamer's coverage and reveal of Killing Floor 2, they announced subscribers to the US version of their magazine would receive an exclusive character skin in Issue #254. The next day Tripwire released a teaser trailer for the game. In June and August 2014, Tripwire released two videos showcasing a selection of the enemy specimens featured in the game. On July 31, 2014, Iceberg Interactive announced a partnership Tripwire to bring Killing Floor 2 to retail stores in Europe and other non-Steam digital platforms. On February 18, 2015, Tripwire released a live action short film, titled Killing Floor: Uncovered, created in collaboration with film production company Type AB. The film is set prior to the events of the first Killing Floor game and details the events that lead to the Zed outbreak.

On April 10, Tripwire gave away keys for an existing beta version of Killing Floor 2 that ran until April 16. On April 21, an early access version of the game was released on Steam for Windows. Meanwhile, the full version of the game was scheduled to be released on both Microsoft Windows and PlayStation 4 in 2016. The game's original soundtrack was released on the same day, under record label Solid State with songs from Living Sacrifice, Demon Hunter, and Impending Doom. A Digital Deluxe Edition of the game is available; bonus features include the soundtrack, a digital artbook, several in-game virtual items, and a copy of the original Killing Floor game. A compilation of both games, titled, Killing Floor: Double Feature was released on May 21, 2019.

Killing Floor 2 was added to the Epic Games Store in July 2020, along with an update for the Steam version to allow cross-play on the Windows versions of either game.

== Reception ==
Reception

Aggregate score
Aggregator	Score		
Aggregator	PC	PS4	Xbox One
Metacritic	75/100	75/100	79/100

Review scores
Publication	Score		
Publication	PC	PS4	Xbox One
Destructoid	9/10		
Game Informer		7.75/10	
GameRevolution		4/5	
GameSpot		8/10	
IGN		8/10	
PC Gamer (US)	81/100		

Killing Floor 2 received "generally favorable" reviews according to review aggregator website Metacritic. However, like the previous game, negative feedback from the reviewers considered that the lack of any real plot or aim for the players other than killing specimens, the small number of existing maps, and the repetitiveness of the gameplay reduced its replay value.
