= Antichamber =

2013 video game

- Developer: Demruth
- Publisher: Demruth
- Designer: Demruth
- Composer: Siddhartha Barnhoorn
- Engine: Unreal Engine 3
- Platforms: Microsoft Windows, Linux, OS X
- Release: Windows; January 31, 2013; Linux, OS X June 12, 2014
- Genre: Puzzle-platform
- Mode: Single-player

Antichamber is a first-person puzzle-platform game created by Australian developer Alexander "Demruth" Bruce. Many of the puzzles are based on phenomena that occur within impossible objects created by the game engine, such as passages that lead the player to different locations depending on which way they face, and structures that seem otherwise impossible within normal three-dimensional space. The game includes elements of psychological exploration through brief messages of advice to help the player figure out solutions to the puzzles as well as adages for real life. The game was released on Steam for Microsoft Windows on January 31, 2013. A version originally sold with the Humble Indie Bundle 11 in 2014 added support for Linux and OS X.

== Gameplay and plot ==
A gallery room in Antichamber demonstrating the use of the impossible object geometries; looking face on to each wall of these individual cubes will show a different scene. The player's manipulation "gun" is shown in the bottom right.

In Antichamber, the player controls the unnamed protagonist from a first-person perspective as they wander through levels. Regarding typical notions of Euclidean space, Bruce has stated that "breaking down all those expectations and then remaking them is essentially the core mechanic of the game".

The player starts in an antechamber that contains four walls. One is a diegetic menu to set the various game options as well as a countdown timer starting at ninety minutes. A second wall provides a map of the game's space that will fill in as the player visits specific rooms, highlighting passages the player has yet to explore, and allows the player, upon return to this room, to jump to any room they've visited before. A third wall shows a series of cartoonish iconographs and obfuscated hint text that are added as the player finds these on walls of the puzzle space. The fourth wall is a window, showing the ultimate goal, the exit from the space, which the player must figure out how to get to.

Puzzle elements in various chambers involve maneuvering themselves around the spaces, where level elements can change after passing certain points, or even based on which direction the player is facing when traversing the level. Laser beams are used as mechanisms to control various doors; these may either require the beams to be blocked or unblocked, and many doors require multiple beams to be in their proper state to open. Initially, the player can trigger these themself. Later, the player gains access to a series of colored "guns", each which helps the player access more of the space. Initially, the gun can pick up any number of small cubes, storing them, and then place them on surfaces; these can be used to block the aforementioned laser beams, or used as platforms for the player to get over obstacles. Other guns can be used to "grow" new blocks by placing blocks out in specific patterns, to direct a connected series of blocks towards an objective point, and to create en masse and fill an area with blocks; later guns retain the abilities of the earlier ones. Certain areas in the space are dead zones that remove any blocks stored in the gun or prevent blocks from moving through them. After most puzzles are signs with the aforementioned iconographs which can be activated to give a hint about the completed puzzle. At any point, the player can jump back to the first room, and use the map to navigate to other areas; this resets any progress made on specific puzzles though the player retains the guns they have obtained.

Upon completing a core set of puzzles, the player can then access the exit door, upon which they start to chase down a black cloud-like shape, using all the solving techniques they have learnt before. Eventually they are able to capture the cloud as a black cube within their gun, and enter a final, more expansive area, where they return the shape to a waiting shell. The shell creates a structure around it – similar to the game's logo – and then sucks everything around it into its centre, sending the screen to black and ending the game.

== Development ==
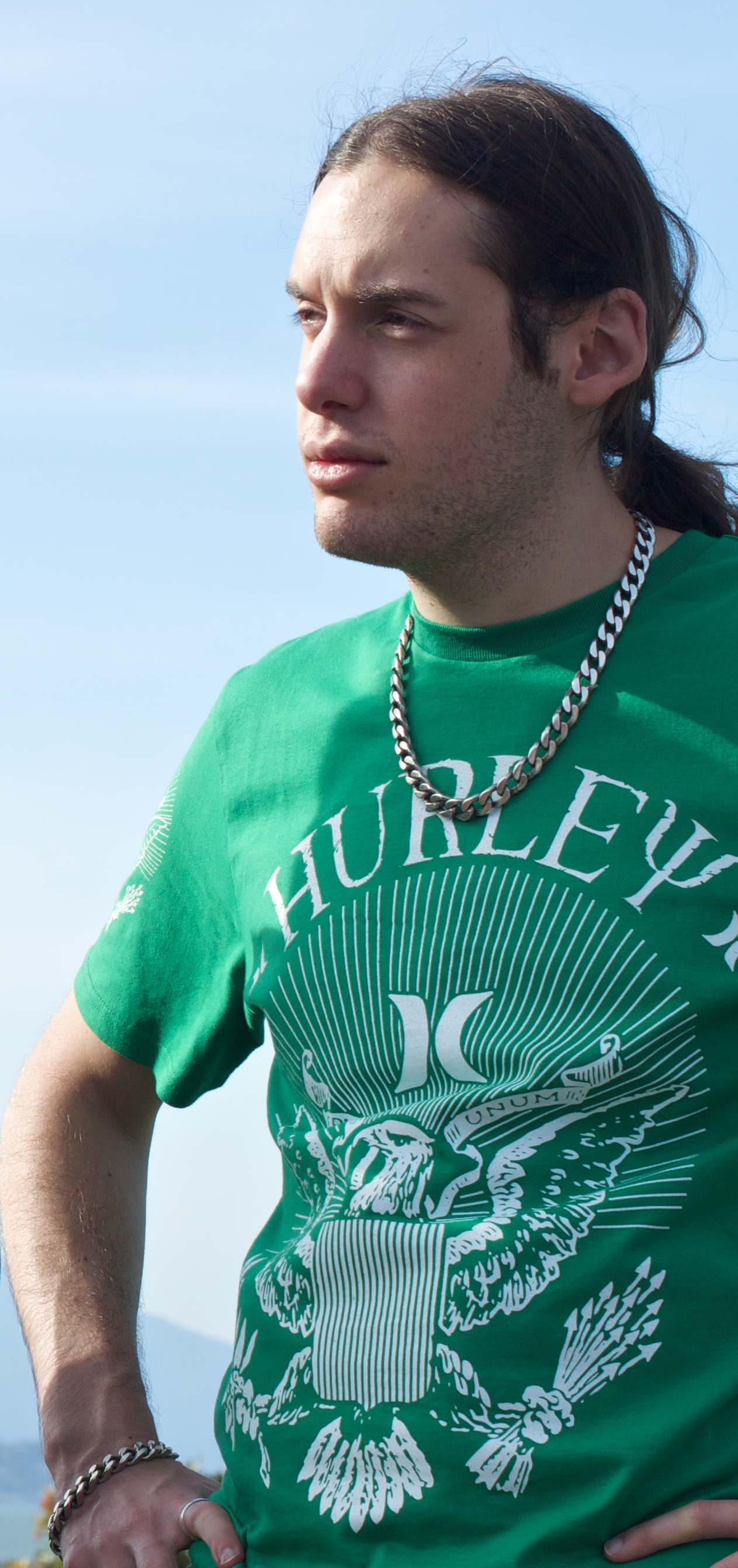
Alexander Bruce at the 2010 Game Developers Conference

Antichamber started as early as 2006 as Bruce's idea for an arena combat game based on expanding the mechanics of the game Snake into a multiplayer experience. Full development of the game, initially called Hazard: The Journey of Life, did not start until 2009 and continued into 2010. Bruce developed the game using UnrealScript with the Unreal Engine 3. As Bruce iterated through its design, he dropped the combat portion and chose to focus more on a single-player puzzle game along with the psychology of the puzzles, eventually adding the subtitle "The Journey of Life" in 2009. Part of this change came about how he was able to create Impossible Object spaces within the Unreal Engine, which came about as a result of a "rookie error" in coding. Bruce recognized that there was a single-player game behind creating spaces and puzzles where the player would have to work out how the rules work, and expanded the game in that direction. Bruce said in a 2011 interview with Kotaku that "the game started off as being all about geometry... I needed to find a way to represent that [non-physical geometry] to players... so I needed to work out why we would need this non-physical geometry in the world and it took me a couple years but after combining geometry and space and perception, I realised that the real reason that this game is interesting and is working is because it's about psychology." As he worked out puzzles, he found that injecting philosophical ideas helped to lead to puzzle designs or otherwise augment established puzzles, and made that part of Antichamber's approach. The game's simple art style was partially to distinguish the game from other Unreal Engine games, while also to aid in masking the work behind the inverse lighting system used in the game.

On April 2, 2012, Antichamber became the seventh game to receive funding from the Indie Fund with Bruce citing the award as "finishing funds" to ensure the game can be released in 2012, and was ultimately released in January 2013.

=== Music ===
The soundtrack for Antichamber consists of ambient music composed by Siddhartha Barnhoorn. The music evolves over the course of the game, starting with nothing more than one ambient layer in the first level and gradually progressing into a complex soundscape. In an interview with IndieGames.com, Barnhoorn revealed that the soundtrack comprises sounds from various guitars, the shakuhachi, the koto, and synth pads. In addition, Barnhoorn stated that the non-synth sounds are digitally manipulated "here and there in order to make the sounds a bit longer than they would appear naturally". Antichamber Suite, a track consisting of music from the game, was released via Bandcamp on February 13, 2012. The track was also featured in the Nubuwo Debut Bundle released March 2, 2012. The full soundtrack was released on February 18, 2013.

== Reception ==
Reception

Aggregate score
Aggregator	Score
Metacritic	82/100

Review scores
Publication	Score
Destructoid	8.5/10
Edge	6/10
Eurogamer	6/10
Game Informer	9/10
GameSpot	8.5/10
GameSpy	4/5
GameTrailers	8.7/10
Gamezebo	4/5
Giant Bomb	4/5
IGN	8.6/10
PC Gamer (UK)	82/100
Polygon	9/10
The Telegraph	4/5
VentureBeat	92/100
Digital Spy	4/5
National Post	9/10

=== Pre-release ===
The PC version was well received by critics prior to its commercial release. In 2009 the game was featured in the showcase at the Tokyo Game Show Sense of Wonder Night, and was a finalist in the Independent Games Festival China. In 2010, indiePub Games's third Independent Game Developers' Competition awarded the PC version the prize for Technical Excellence. In 2011 the game was a finalist in GameStop's Indie Game Challenge, and in the Make Something Unreal competition (run by Epic Games), the game won 1st for Best Level for a Mod in Phase 4, 3rd for Best non-FPS Mod in Phase 4, and 5th place overall in the grand finals. During the 2011 Independent Games Festival, the game wound up as a finalist for the Nuovo Award, which recognises "abstract, short-form, and unconventional game development". Also in 2011, the game made it into the PAX 10 and finished as a finalist in the IndieCade festival. In 2012, Antichamber took home the Technical Excellence Award at the Independent Games Festival.

=== Post-release ===
The PC version received "favorable" reviews according to the review aggregation website Metacritic.

Most reviewers praised the level design and puzzles in the game. Game Informer wrote that "I rarely ever felt stuck or frustrated by a lack of progress – a testament to Antichamber's pacing and design", and GameTrailers said, "The true star of Antichamber is its level design." PC Gamer described the game as hosting "moments of transcendent beauty and vignettes that engage your brain on a level few games attempt" and IGN called the puzzles "expertly crafted and wonderfully inventive challenges."

National Post gave it a score of nine out of ten, saying, "In its own way, Antichamber serves as an antithesis to modern day video game design. Just to experience solving a puzzle by thinking outside of the box makes Antichamber a must play for anyone looking to be challenged." Digital Spy gave it four stars out of five, saying, "The main slight against Antichamber is its personality, or lack of. It's visually interesting but also feels atmospherically empty and austere. If you can embrace that, though, and you have enough patience to crack the obstacles in your way, there may not be a puzzle game this year more rewarding as this one." Metro gave it eight out of ten, saying, "Frustrating and confusing almost by design, Antichamber is nevertheless one of the most intelligent and imaginative puzzle games for years." However, The Digital Fix gave it seven out of ten, saying, "Like a lot of various other media and art, I can appreciate the technical skill involved in its creation, but find it a tad too vexing for my own personal enjoyment. Maybe this dog's too old to be taught new tricks; players more able of mind may fare better. But don't count on it." Toronto Sun gave it seven out of ten, saying, "As an experimental bit of game design full of intriguing puzzles that defy earthly geometry, Antichamber is a success. Yet given a choice, I'd much rather spend my time with a more conventional first-person puzzler like Portal 2, Quantum Conundrum or Q.U.B.E. Maybe Antichamber is a little too clever for its own good. Or maybe I'm just dumb."

Within two months of its release on Steam the game sold more than 100,000 units, with most of the sales coming during the first week of release.

Bruce stated in April 2024 that he was working towards the release of another game, though cautioned that the game may be more difficult than Antichamber.

== See also ==
- List of video games derived from modifications
