= Killing Floor 3 =

2025 video game

- Developer: Tripwire Interactive
- Publisher: Tripwire Interactive
- Director: Bryan Wynia
- Producer: Thomas Dahlberg
- Designers: Leland Scali; David Hensley
- Programmer: Aaron Molina
- Artist: Andrew Kerschner
- Composer: Rocky Gray
- Series: Killing Floor
- Engine: Unreal Engine 5
- Platforms: PlayStation 5; Windows; Xbox Series X/S
- Release: July 24, 2025
- Genre: First-person shooter
- Modes: Single-player, multiplayer

Killing Floor 3 is a 2025 first-person shooter game developed and published by Tripwire Interactive. A successor to Killing Floor 2 (2016), the game was released for PlayStation 5, Windows and Xbox Series X/S on July 24, 2025. It received mixed reviews from critics.

== Gameplay ==
Killing Floor 3 is a first-person survival horror shooter. In the game, which supports both solo play and six-player cooperative multiplayer, players must defeat waves of zombie-like bioengineered creatures known as "Zeds". The number of enemies appearing in each match is adjusted to the size of the player's team. The game features a hub space known as the Stronghold where players can choose their playable character and mission location before a match commences. The game features six different specialists, with each having their own unique weapons and special attacks. For instance, the Ninja specialist wields a pair of swords, and uses a grappling hook that can pull them towards an enemy. As players accumulate Zed kills, they can also trigger "Zed Time", which briefly slows down time and highlights all nearby enemies. In between rounds, players can stock up on ammo and other resources, as well as using the Multi-tool to activate devices such as sentry guns or ziplines. As players complete matches, they will be able to customize their weapon with new mods, and unlock new skills for their specialists. During each match, players can also complete optional narrative assignments which expand the story and the world of Killing Floor.

== Development and release ==
Tripwire Interactive led the game's development. Creative director Bryan Wynia described Killing Floor 3 as the "direct sequel" to the first game, with the team aiming to recapture its "darker, grittier tone". Despite its sci-fi setting, the game was designed to be grounded, and that the game will not feature any outlandish weapons or gadgets. Player movement was overhauled, with players now being able to perform feats such as climbing onto ledges, dodging, and sliding. Wynia added that the team reduced the number of Zeds in each match and slow down the pace of combat when compared with previous games, all enemies, including the basic ones, are more dangerous as they are equipped with new skills and movement options. Due to the increased mobility of both the player character and the Zeds, maps were designed to be more vertical in nature. The M.E.A.T. (massive evisceration and trauma) system, introduced in the previous game, returned in Killing Floor 3 to depict dynamic gore and detailed graphic violence. According to Wynia, the body horror genre, such as The Thing, inspired the game's enemy design, while Aliens vs. Predators influenced its overall look and feel.

Tripwire Interactive announced Killing Floor 3 at Gamescom in August 2023. A closed multiplayer beta was released in January 2025. The game was originally scheduled to release for PlayStation 5, Windows, and Xbox Series X/S on March 25, 2025, but was delayed for a general 2025 release window as the studio received negative player feedback following the closed beta period. At launch, the game has seven maps, three difficulty modes, and three boss encounters, as well as 30 upgradable levels for each specialist. The game was released on July 24, 2025.

In July 2025, shortly before the game's release, a GameSpot report revealed that players invited to a recent playtest were required to sign a non-disclosure agreement (NDA) with a five-year duration. The NDA barred testers from sharing any details about the build, despite the game being only days from launch.

== Reception ==
Reception

Aggregate score
| Aggregator | Score |
|---|---|
| OpenCritic | 37% recommend (Note: Based on 87 reviews) |

Killing Floor 3 received "mixed or average" reviews from critics, according to review aggregator website Metacritic. IGN gave praise to the game's shooting mechanics, but criticized the game's lack of maps and weapon progression systems.
