= The Stone of Madness =

- Developer: The Game Kitchen
- Publisher: Tripwire Presents
- Directors: José Antonio Gutiérrez; Maikel Ortega
- Designers: José Antonio Gutiérrez; Maikel Ortega
- Programmers: Rafael Muñoz; Cristina Ramos
- Artist: José Antonio Gutiérrez
- Writers: José Antonio Gutiérrez; Laura Rubio
- Composers: Pascual de Gállego; Kid Peligro
- Engine: Unity Engine
- Platforms: Microsoft Windows; Nintendo Switch; PlayStation 5; Xbox Series X/S
- Release: 28 January 2025
- Genres: Real-time strategy, stealth
- Mode: Single-player

The Stone of Madness is a real-time strategy stealth game developed by The Game Kitchen and published by Tripwire Presents. It was released for Windows, Nintendo Switch, PlayStation 5, and Xbox Series X and Series S in January 2025.

== Gameplay ==
The Stone of Madness is played from an isometric perspective.

The Stone of Madness is a real-time strategy stealth video game played from an isometric perspective. The game features two separate campaigns, in which the player must guide a group of prisoners to escape an 18th-century Spanish monastery while uncovering its dark secrets. The game features five playable characters, though the player can only bring three characters to go on each mission at a given time. Each of the five characters have their own skills, but they also have their own fears. For instance, Eduardo, who is capable of moving heavy objects to create new paths for the team, but he is scared of the dark. If the player kept exposing them to their fears, their sanity will wane, and new weaknesses will emerge. The characters will spend the day exploring the monastery, gathering resources and tools, uncovering clues and completing objectives, and spend the night crafting resources and recovering. Players need to be aware of the time of day, as the monastery follows a routine and patrol routes of soldiers will change regularly. Players can also sneak out at night for new gameplay opportunities, though the characters will also have to face supernatural horrors thwarting their progress.

== Development ==
The game was originally developed by Teku Studio. The Game Kitchen, the studio behind Blasphemous and its sequel, Blasphemous II, acquired Teku and became a collaborator on the game. As with The Game Kitchen's previous works, the game was heavily influenced by Spanish culture, with Enrique Colinet, lead level designer, citing The Name of the Rose and The Abbey of Crime as its sources of inspiration. The team also cited Broken Lines, Commandos, Darkwood, Desperados III, and Shadow Tactics: Blades of the Shogun as their inspirations for the game. The team described The Stone of Madness as a heist game in which preparations were key to success. Players must observe and understand the cycle of the monastery, and make incremental progress in order to achieve their objectives. According to the team, failing in the game was an essential part for players to learn. The game does not allowed players to save frequently, forcing players to adapt to new strategies when their original plan went awry. The game was designed to allow players to succeed in achieving their objectives despite the capture of one or two characters in the party.

Inspired by Broken Sword, the game used rotoscoping techniques while creating its characters and the team handpainted most of the scenarios, though the process was described by director Maikel Ortega as "painful and expensive". The art style of the game was influenced by the works of Spanish painter Francisco Goya.

The game was first announced by Teku Studios and publisher Merge Games in August 2020 with a target release window of early 2021. The Game Kitchen, following its acquisition of the Teku Studios, officially revealed the game in August 2024. The game was released for Windows, Nintendo Switch, PlayStation 5, and Xbox Series X and Series S on January 28, 2025 by publisher Tripwire Interactive.

== Reception ==
Reception

Aggregate scores
Aggregator	Score
Metacritic	(PC) 73/100
OpenCritic	67% recommend

Review scores
Publication	Score
Eurogamer	4/5
IGN	6/10
Nintendo Life	7/10
Slant Magazine	4/5

The game received "mixed or average" reviews upon release, according to the review aggregation website Metacritic. Fellow review aggregator OpenCritic assessed that the game received fair approval, being recommended by 67% of critics.

Steven Scaife from Slant Magazine compared the game to other RTS games like Desperados III and Shadow Gambit: The Cursed Crew, and appreciated its uniqueness due to its setting and its focus on "desperation and disempowerment". He felt that weaknesses of the character helped convey the harshness of the setting, and described that the game can be a tense experience, adding that "The Stone of Madness is cleverly attuned to perseverance through incremental progress". Lewis Gordon from Eurogamer wrote that the setting was memorable, applauded its focus on mental health of its characters, and enjoyed its gameplay for offering "an electric combination of coincidence, luck, skill and opportunity". However, he felt that the day-night cycle occasionally overshadowed the overarching narrative.

Eric van Allen from IGN felt that its technical issues and various gameplay bugs significantly dragged down an otherwise engaging experience. Francisco Dominguez, writing for Nintendo Life, liked the game's art style and praised the gameplay for its immersive sim inspirations. However, he found the game lacking in "quality-of-life features" and "genre innovations" found in other games, and remarked that the game's high difficulty and confusing objectives resulted in a frustrating gameplay experience.
