= Angels Fall First (video game) =

2026 video game

- Developer: Strangely Interactive Ltd
- Publisher: Strangely Interactive Ltd
- Engine: Unreal Development Kit
- Platform: Microsoft Windows
- Release: 11 July 2026
- Genre: First-person shooter
- Modes: Single-player, multiplayer

Angels Fall First: Planetstorm
- Developer: Strangely Interactive Ltd
- Engine: Unreal Engine 3
- Platform: Microsoft Windows
- Genre: First-person shooter
- Modes: Single-player, multiplayer

Angels Fall First is a science fiction first-person multiplayer shooter by British studio Strangely Interactive. It combines gameplay elements of traditional squad-based shooters with space combat games, with a particular focus on the ability to pilot and crew capital ships, which also serve as infantry combat settings themselves. Originally a mod of Epic Games' first-person shooter Unreal Tournament 3 and referred to as Angels Fall First: Planetstorm, the project was later moved to the Unreal Development Kit to be developed as a stand-alone game. It released on Steam on 11 July 2026.

== Gameplay ==
Angels Fall First combines two types of gameplay: FPS and space shooters. Several of its maps take place on planet surfaces, primarily focused on combined arms warfare, featuring Fast-Attack vehicles, Armoured Personnel Carriers, Tanks and atmospheric Gunships. Others take place in space with a variety of spacecraft ranging from small fighters to large capital ships, all of which can be piloted and crewed by players. Infantry combat also takes place in space maps: several maps feature objectives that require infantry to board a location by dropship. Furthermore, players are able to board enemy capital ships through the same method, allowing them to destroy its key components and ultimately destroy the capital ship. The game is geared towards online multiplayer but has support for offline single-player gameplay, which uses bots to compensate for the lack of players. The average server has a maximum of 64 player slots.

The game play on a player to player basis also consists of a command hierarchy which consists of three types of players:

1. The commander, which is voted at the beginning of the round by other players, the commanders duty is to lead the team to victory and can ping certain objectives for the team leaders to focus on, or he can split up the teams effort
2. The squad leader, this players job is to lead a squad of 1-5 (on the norm) including himself. In which he tells the squad on what objective to focus on. The squad leader takes direct orders from the commander and orders his squad to do other, smaller tasks.
3. The squad member, the lowest on the command structure, this player takes direct orders from the squad leader and does what the squad leader wants.

== Setting ==
Angels Fall First takes place in a future where humanity has colonized multiple star systems, during a conflict called the Second Antarean War fought between the Antarean Empire and the United League of Planets, an alliance of several stellar states.

The war was caused by a variety of factors: the gradual decay of the United League of Planets (itself created out of necessity during the First Antarean War), the upsurge of nationalism among the Antareans, and the reestablishment of old alliances by the rebel Antarean factions. Its primary cause was the Crowning Day Massacre, in which a naval blunder by the United League of Planets caused the deaths of thousands of civilians during an Antarean holiday, including that of a well-loved public Antarean figure. In the resulting chaos, the long-lost heir to the Antarean throne reappeared, solidifying the Antarean revolt and throwing the regions into a full-scale war. Players participate in the conflict as soldiers of the Antarean Imperial Army (AIA) and the United League Army (ULA).

== Development ==
Angels Fall First purportedly entered development as early as 2005. The mod for Unreal Tournament 2004, Angels Fall First: Planetstorm, was submitted to the Make Something Unreal Contest hosted by Epic Games, where it won prizes in the pre-final phases, eventually winning third place in the Grand Finals.

In 2009, the developers of Angels Fall First stopped working on the Unreal Tournament 3 mod. The developers changed the game engine to the Unreal Development Kit so they could make Angels Fall First a stand-alone game. A demo version of the mod ported into the UDK engine was released in 2009. The game was released in Steam Early Access on October 10, 2015. The early access period concluded with the full version releasing on Steam on 11 July 2026.

Shortly after release, a developer began an initiative for games in a competitive-style environment - referred to as "Clan Operations". These games are smaller scale, focusing on player coordination rather than the disorganized chaotic experiences of public matches in the genre.
