= Tripwire Interactive =

American video game developer and publisher

Tripwire Interactive LLC
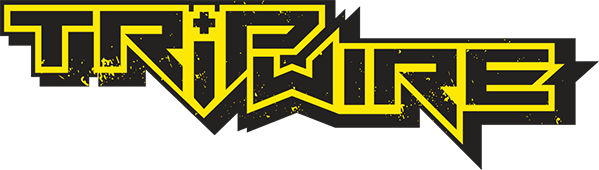
- Type: Subsidiary
- Industry: Video games
- Founded: February 17, 2005; 21 years ago
- Founder: John Gibson & Alan Wilson
- Headquarters: Roswell, Georgia, U.S.
- Key people: Matthew LoPilato (CEO) Alan Wilson (Vice President)
- Products: Red Orchestra series; Killing Floor series
- Number of employees: 120 (2024)
- Parent: Saber Interactive (2022–2024); Embracer Group (2024-present)
- Divisions: Tripwire Presents
- Website: tripwireinteractive.com

Tripwire Interactive LLC is an American video game developer and publisher based in Roswell, Georgia. The studio is primarily known for the Killing Floor series of co-op shooter games.

== History ==
Tripwire was co-founded by John Gibson and Alan Wilson with support by members of the international team that created Unreal Tournament 2004 mod Red Orchestra: Combined Arms. Red Orchestra won top prize in the Nvidia-sponsored Make Something Unreal competition. Their first retail product, the World War II-themed first-person shooter Red Orchestra: Ostfront 41-45, was released over Valve's Steam service on March 14, 2006.

Tripwire's second game, Killing Floor, was released on May 14, 2009. Like Red Orchestra, this game also began development as a mod for Unreal Tournament 2004, later becoming a standalone retail title. Tripwire released and published its third game on September 13, 2011, titled Red Orchestra 2: Heroes of Stalingrad, which is the sequel to Red Orchestra: Ostfront 41-45. The title focuses heavily on the Battle of Stalingrad, and uses Unreal Engine 3. On May 30, 2013, the expansion pack Rising Storm was released, focusing on the Pacific War with real life battle locations such as the Battle of Iwo Jima.

After 2014, both Rising Storm and Red Orchestra 2 were integrated into a single release titled Red Orchestra 2: Heroes of Stalingrad with Rising Storm.

Tripwire Interactive announced its fifth game, Killing Floor 2, in May 2014 and released it into early access in early 2015. In 2015, Tripwire announced Rising Storm 2: Vietnam at E3 2015 and proceeded to release it in 2017.

On September 4, 2021, Tripwire CEO and co-founder John Gibson stated on Twitter that he supports the Texas Heartbeat Act. The act bans abortion after an embryo's heartbeat is detected, except to save the mother's life. In response, Gibson faced criticism from people involved in the video games industry, including Torn Banner Studios, which had used Tripwire for publishing of Chivalry 2, and Shipwright Studios, which had been working with Tripwire for three years but stated their intent to terminate these contracts due to the comments. By September 6, 2021, Gibson announced he was stepping down as CEO of Tripwire, and the company issued its own announcement that "the comments given by John Gibson are of his own opinion, and do not reflect those of Tripwire Interactive as a company". Tripwire announced that co-founder and vice president Alan Wilson would assume Gibson's duties, and that the company would immediately address employee concerns related to Gibson's statement and promote open communication to transition to the new leadership.

In August 2022, it was announced that Tripwire was being purchased by Embracer Group, the parent company of THQ Nordic. The company would be made a subsidiary of Saber Interactive. In March 2024, Embracer sold Saber to Beacon Interactive. The deal included several of the studios under Saber, but Tripwire will remain under Embracer.

On 10 April 2024, Matthew LoPilato assumed the role of CEO of Tripwire following the stepping down of previous CEO John Gibson and interim CEO Alan Wilson. Matthew LoPilato previously held the role of CFO in Tripwire. Alan Wilson transitioned to a vice presidency role within the company.

== Games developed ==
Logo used until 2015

Year	Title	Platform(s)
2006	Red Orchestra: Ostfront 41-45	Windows, Linux, OS X
2009	Killing Floor	Windows, Linux, OS X
2011	Red Orchestra 2: Heroes of Stalingrad	Windows
2013	Rising Storm	Windows
2016	Killing Floor 2	Windows, PlayStation 4, Xbox One
2017	Rising Storm 2: Vietnam	Windows
2017	Killing Floor: Incursion	Windows (VR), PlayStation 4 (PlayStation VR)
2020	Maneater	Windows, PlayStation 4, Xbox One, Nintendo Switch, PlayStation 5, Xbox Series X/S, iOS, Android
2025	Killing Floor 3	Windows, PlayStation 5, Xbox Series X/S
2027	Maneater 2	Windows, Nintendo Switch 2, PlayStation 5, Xbox Series X/S

== Games published ==
- The Ball
- Dwarfs!?
- Killing Floor: Calamity
- Zeno Clash
- Road Redemption
- Espire 1: VR Operative
- Espire 2
- Chivalry 2
- Deceive Inc.
- Rogue Waters
- The Stone of Madness
- Norse: Oath of Blood
