= Depth (video game) =

2014 video game

- Developer: Digital Confectioners
- Engine: Unreal Engine 3
- Platform: Windows
- Release: WW: November 3, 2014
- Genre: First-person shooter
- Mode: Multiplayer

Depth is a video game developed by Digital Confectioners and released for Microsoft Windows in 2014. It is an asymmetrical multiplayer first-person shooter that pits treasure hunting divers against sharks.

== Gameplay ==
The game is a first-person shooter taking place in underwater environments. Players can either be divers or sharks. Divers escort and defend an automated submersible to collect sunken treasure, utilizing firearms, harpoons, explosives, and other equipment bought with collected treasure, while sharks, with different species having different abilities, "evolve" new abilities by killing and eating divers. Games are won by either side running out of respawns, by divers successfully escorting the submersible to an extraction point, or by sharks destroying the submersible.

== Development ==
Depth began production in 2009, as a student project built as a mod for Unreal Tournament 3, by a small team led by Alex Quick of Killing Floor fame. Between 2010 and 2012, the game was ported to UDK and became a standalone game. However, development became stalled, due to concerns over gameplay. In 2013, Digital Confectioners partnered with the team to finish development. In 2016, Digital Confectioners bought out the project and have continued development on the title until late 2025 when the IP was purchased by Ammobox Studios

== Release ==
Depth was put on the Steam store as a pre-order on October 16, 2014, and released on November 3, 2014. "The Big Catch" update was released on December 16, 2014, adding 2 new shark classes, 1 new map and a new game type called "Megalodon Hunt."

== Reception ==
Reception

Aggregate scores
Aggregator	Score
GameRankings	69%
Metacritic	65/100

Review scores
Publication	Score
GameSpot	5/10
IGN	7.7/10

Depth received moderately positive reviews from critics. IGN described Depth as having "an ocean of tense, unique gameplay moments," praising the game's level and sound design and describing playing as both a diver or a shark is a "fast, fun, and frantic experience." IGN criticized the game's lack of game modes and its "skimpy" customization options, saying that they "doubt the longevity of this otherwise ship-shape game." GameSpot is less favorable, noting low-quality textures, balancing issues and lack of memorable levels, describing the game as shallow. GameSpot did hope that future updates to clean up bugs and add new content could help the game reach its full potential.

Both Multiplayer and GameSpot stated that the game negatively draws from the gameplay established in the Left for Dead series. Independent review site deviantrobot said that Depth is very similar to Evolve, though that "the game is unique enough that it stands on its own merits and it's not just to fill the Evolve-shaped hole in your gaming library."
