= Gotland Game Conference =

Gotland Game Conference (GGC), previously known as the Gotland Game Awards, is an international conference, game exhibition and -competition for students. The event is held annually and marks the end of the academic year for the students at the Department of Game Design at Campus Gotland, Uppsala University. Here they can showcase everything that they have learned during the year to a jury consisting of professionals from the game development industry, the gaming press and academia.

== History ==
The Department of Game Design on Gotland, Visby, has hosted a public event for displaying student projects since at least 2002. The event found a stable structure and was branded "Gotland Game Awards" in 2006 and re-branded "Gotland Game Conference" in 2011, when a presentation track was added and the event opened to public participation. In 2017 the GGC added an international summit for game educators — with the intention of annually gathering game educations from across the world to collaborate and share experiences.

- Theme Park / Revive 2002
- Public exhibition 2004
- Gotland Game Convention 2006
- Gotland Game Awards 2007
- Gotland Game Awards 2008
- Gotland Game Awards 2009
- Gotland Game Awards 2010
- Gotland Game Conference 2011
- Gotland Game Conference 2012
- Gotland Game Conference 2013
- Gotland Game Conference 2014
- Gotland Game Conference 2015
- Gotland Game Conference 2016
- Gotland Game Conference 2017 + Game Educators Summit
- Gotland Game Conference 2018 + Game Educators Summit
- Gotland Game Conference 2019 + Game Educators Summit
- Gotland Game Conference 2020 + Game Educators Summit (cancelled due to the COVID-19 pandemic)

== The event ==
The event can be seen as consisting of four separate parts (spanning over multiple days);

- Public presentation of student projects to an international jury of developers, designers, academics, journalists etc.
- Followed by The Gotland Game Conference + showfloor, where all student games are made available to the jury and general audience.
  - The conference + show floor is roughly modeled after the Game Developers Conference, but features only a single track of lectures.
- The Award Ceremony
- The GGC Party where students, jury and faculty celebrate their work and end of the school year.

== Game Awards ==
The Department of Game Design maintains a public database of all games and students that have been awarded at the Gotland Game Conference. It is not uncommon for students recognized at the GGC to go on and win other national- and international awards.

== Game Awards (2018–) ==
- Best Presentation: Take My Shift
- Best Arcade Experience: Coal Rush
- Student Choice: Momentum Drift
- Alumni of the Year: Max Tiilikainen
- The Social Game Award: Twined
- Public Choice: Bench Warmers, Neon Nemesis (tie)
- The Almedalen Library Award: Symbio
- The Innovation Award: Nova Factor
- The Woke Award: Re Leap
- Expression in Game Design: Momentum Drift
- Jury Spotlight: Bolt and Bobby
- Jury Spotlight: Symbio

== Game Awards (2006–2017) ==
Award	Year	Game / Name	Notes
Pwnage Award (Best in competition)	2017	Pump The Frog	
Pwnage Award (Best in competition)	2016	Anchored	
Pwnage Award (Best in competition)	2015	Frog Climbers	
Pwnage Award (Best in competition)	2014	Crocodile Chow Down	
Pwnage Award (Best in competition)	2013	CoBots	
Pwnage Award (Best in competition)	2012	Little Warlock	
Pwnage Award (Best in competition)	2011	Adventure League	
Pwnage Award (Best in competition)	2010	Dwarfs	
Pwnage Award (Best in competition)	2009	Walkabout	
Pwnage Award (Best in competition)	2008	Vertigo	
Pwnage Award (Best in competition)	2007	Fairytale	
Best First Year Project	2017	Pump The Frog	
Best First Year Project	2016	Cryptogram	
Best First Year Project	2015	Frog Climbers	
Best First Year Project	2014	Crocodile Chow Down	
Best First Year Project	2013	CoBots	
Best First Year Project	2012	Clapper	
Best First Year Project	2011		There were no class awards this year.
Best First Year Project	2010	Gods of Steel	Best Arcade Game
Best First Year Project	2009	Chubby Chase Race	Best Arcade Game
Best First Year Project	2008	Deep Ocean	Best Arcade Game
Best First Year Project	2007	BLOmma	Best Arcade Game
Best First Year Project	2006	Head Banger	Best Arcade Game
Best Second Year Project	2017	Somnium	
Best Second Year Project	2016	Anchored	
Best Second Year Project	2015	Clouds Below	
Best Second Year Project	2014	Defunct	
Best Second Year Project	2013	Ghoulies	
Best Second Year Project	2012	Little Warlock	
Best Second Year Project	2011		There were no class awards this year.
Best Second Year Project	2010	Abzolium	Best Big Game
Best Second Year Project	2009	Cause of War	Best Big Game
Best Second Year Project	2008	Planetaria	Best Big Game
Best Third Year project	2017	Penny's Farm	
Best Third Year project	2016	Tamarrion	
Best Third Year project	2015	Agency	
Best Third Year project	2014	Veer	
Best Third Year project	2013	Little Warlock	
Best Third Year project	2012	Secrets of Grindea	
Best Third Year project	2011		There were no class awards this year.
Best Third Year project	2010	Fumbies - The Cloud Creatures	Best Graduating Class
Best Third Year project	2009	Exhaust	Best Graduating Class
Cha-ching! Award (Most commercially viable)	2017	Pump The Frog	
Cha-ching! Award (Most commercially viable)	2016	Anchored	
Cha-ching! Award (Most commercially viable)	2015	Summit Chasers	
Cha-ching! Award (Most commercially viable)	2014	Tower Offensive	
Cha-ching! Award (Most commercially viable)	2013	Little Warlock	
Cha-ching! Award (Most commercially viable)	2012	Little Warlock	
Cha-ching! Award (Most commercially viable)	2011	Victorious Skies	
The Almedalen Library Award	2017	Pump The Frog	
The Almedalen Library Award	2016	F.R.A.U.S.	
The Almedalen Library Award	2015	Colors of the Wind	
The Almedalen Library Award	2013	Lunar Love	
The Almedalen Library Award	2010	Fumbies - The Cloud Creatures	
The Almedalen Library Award	2009	Ghost Written	
The Almedalen Library Award	2008	Fairytale	
The Innovation Award	2017	Grave Call	
The Innovation Award	2016	Cryptogram	
The Innovation Award	2015	Workspace Warfare	
The Innovation Award	2014	Crocodile Chow Down	
The Innovation Award	2013	Torn	
The Innovation Award	2012	BlockDropper	
Best Presentation
Best Presentation	2017	Penny's Farm	
Best Presentation	2016	Slumber	
Best Presentation	2015	Tamarrion	
Best Presentation	2014	Tower Offensive	
Best Presentation	2012	Clapper	
Best Presentation	2011		
Best Presentation	2010	Midnight	
Best Presentation	2009	Ghost Written	
Best Presentation	2008	In Other Words	
Best Presentation	2007	Roskilde	
Alumni of the Year Award	2017	Pernilla Sparrhult	Paradox
Alumni of the Year Award	2017	Joakim Andreason	Paradox Interactive
Alumni of the Year Award	2016	Kim Aava	Guerrilla Games
Alumni of the Year Award	2015	Rikard Jaksch	King
Alumni of the Year Award	2014	Ted Sjöström	Pixel Ferrets
Alumni of the Year Award	2013	Annika O. Bergström	Södertörn University
Alumni of the Year Award	2012		
Alumni of the Year Award	2011	Karin Ryding	Ozma Games
Alumni of the Year Award	2010	Johannes Wadin	Might and Delight
Alumni of the Year Award	2009	Peter Stråhle	GRIN
Alumni of the Year Award	2008	Anders Ekermo	Starbreeze
Alumni of the Year Award	2007	Mats Andersson	Avalanche Studios

== People's Choice Awards ==
Award	Year	Game	Notes
Student's Choice	2017	Penny's Farm	
Student's Choice	2016	Neiva	
Student's Choice	2015	PvGvP	
Student's Choice	2014	Undercover Agency	
Student's Choice	2013	Tribal Marathon	
Student's Choice	2012	Secrets of Grindea	
People's Choice / Public Choice
People's Choice / Public Choice	2011	Overkill	
People's Choice / Public Choice	2010	Abzolium	
People's Choice / Public Choice	2009	Chubby Chase Race	
People's Choice - Most Helpful Group
People's Choice - Most Helpful Group	2009	Archaic	

== Special awards ==
Award	Year	Game	Notes
Best Serious Game
Best Serious Game	2010	Colorless	
Best Serious Game	2009	Ghost Written	
Best Serious Game	2008	GameRider	
Best Serious Game	2007	Wobble Trouble	
Best Exhibition
Best Exhibition	2010	Abzolium	
Best Exhibition	2009	Penalty of Heroes	
The Award for Human Rights and Anti-discrimination
The Award for Human Rights and Anti-discrimination	2011	Contingency	
The Award for Human Rights and Anti-discrimination	2010	Pawns	
The Award for Human Rights and Anti-discrimination	2009	Cause of War	
The Award for Human Rights and Anti-discrimination	2008	Insats Afrika	Red Cross Award #1
The Award for Human Rights and Anti-discrimination	2008	Monks of Sangrael	Red Cross Award #2
JADE Project Award
JADE Project Award	2009	Archaic	
JADE Project Award	2008	Fairytale	
TUT-MS Dean's Award
TUT-MS Dean's Award	2016	Giddy Up	
TUT-MS Dean's Award	2014	Vertigoat	NicoGRAPH Conference
NicoGRAPH Award
NicoGRAPH Award	2014	Crocodile Chow Down	
Best XNA Game
Best XNA Game	2010	Abzolium	
Best Cinematic
Best Cinematic	2009	Trojan Sheep	
Nordic Game Jam
Nordic Game Jam	2009	Sheep away	
Mathematical Game
Mathematical Game	2009	Euklides Magic	
Best Game - Open and Invitational
Best Game - Open and Invitational	2008	Dark Room	

== Computer Animation Awards ==
Award	Year	Game	Notes
Best CG Animation
Best CG Animation	2011	Halberts Monocle	
Best CG Animation	2010	The Secret Chamber	
Best Commercial
Best Commercial	2009	Cube	
Best Commercial	2008	Wacom in Motion	
Best Graduating Class
Best Graduating Class	2010	From One Motherfucker To Another	
Spotlight Category
Spotlight Category	2010	Octopus Painting Duel	
Best Student Animation
Best Student Animation	2009	09-09-14	
Open and Invitational
Open and Invitational	2008	Perfekt	
Theme Park
Theme Park	2008	In Harmony with Nature	

== Student Effort Awards ==
Award	Year	Game	Notes
Best Student Effort in Art
Best Student Effort in Art	2010	Tobias Andersen	
Best Student Effort in Art	2009	Anders Bäckman	
Best Student Effort Technical
Best Student Effort Technical	2009	Ted Lindström	
Best Student in Computer Graphics
Best Student in Computer Graphics	2009	Tommy Nilsson	
Best Student in Game Design and Graphics
Best Student in Game Design and Graphics	2009	Emma Johansson	
Best Student in Game Design and Programming
Best Student in Game Design and Programming	2009	Tommi Lipponen	
