= Killing Floor (video game) =

- Developer: Tripwire Interactive
- Publisher: Tripwire Interactive
- Designers: John Gibson; Alan Wilson; William T. Munk II; David Hensley
- Programmers: John Gibson; Dayle Flowers; Christian Schneider; Patrick Childers
- Artist: David Hensley
- Composers: zYnthetic; Dirge
- Engine: Unreal Engine 2
- Platforms: Windows, OS X, Linux
- Release: Windows; May 14, 2009; OS X; May 5, 2010; Linux; November 9, 2012
- Genre: First-person shooter
- Modes: Single-player, multiplayer

Killing Floor is a cooperative first-person shooter video game developed and published by Tripwire Interactive. It was originally released as an Unreal Tournament 2004 mod in 2005. A full retail release followed on May 14, 2009, for Microsoft Windows, and for OS X on May 5, 2010. A version for Linux was released via Steam in November 2012.

A sequel, Killing Floor 2, was announced on May 8, 2014, and released on November 18, 2016, worldwide. A third entry, Killing Floor 3, was announced in August 2023 at Gamescom. It was released on July 24th, 2025.

== Gameplay ==
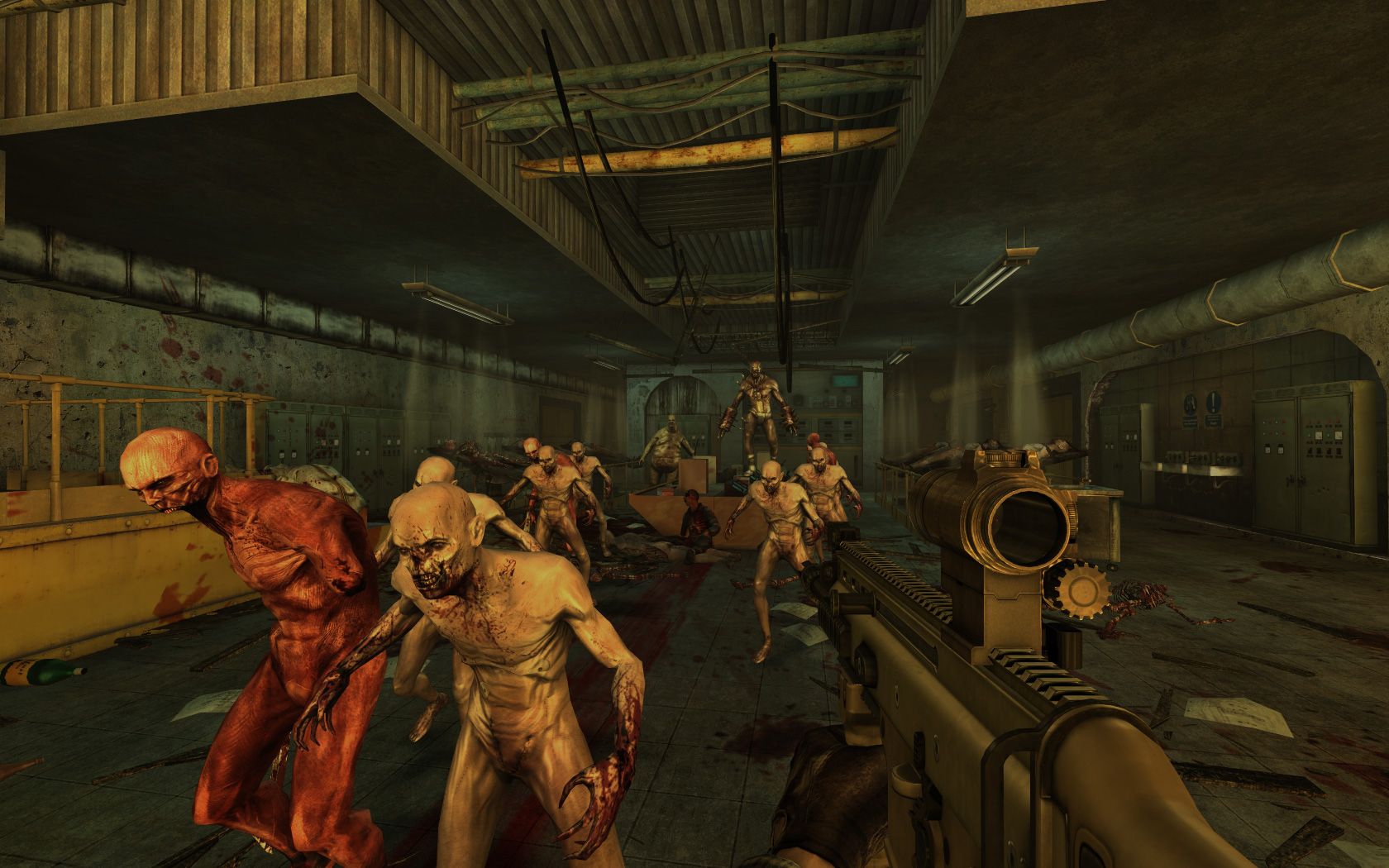
The player fighting a swarm of specimens

Killing Floor is a first-person shooter with two game modes: Killing Floor and Objective. In Killing Floor mode, the player fights waves of zombie-like specimens - or ZEDs - with each wave becoming successively more difficult, until it concludes with a battle against a "boss" specimen called the Patriarch. In Objective mode players complete different challenges while earning in-game money, which they can spend between waves at a trader. The trader buys and sells ammo, armor, and weapons, such as katanas, pipe bombs, flamethrowers and shotguns. Weapons can also be found randomly across the level. Players are encouraged to work together; they can trade items and drop money, healing is more effective on other players than on oneself, and the team can strategically weld doors shut to provide a temporary barrier from the oncoming horde while funneling the other creatures to specific areas.

Players select one of seven perks at the start of a match and between rounds. The perk, similar to the idea of a character class, provides bonuses towards certain weapon types, armor, movement, and other factors. Players can level up each perk to increase the benefits it offers. For example, the "Sharpshooter" perk, which provides accuracy benefits when using scoped rifles, can be raised in level by completing a number of headshots with specific weapons. The player does not need to play with that perk to raise its level. For example, the Field Medic perk requires the player to heal a number of points to level up, but this can also be done while playing any of the other perks.

As long as at least one member survives the wave, players that die during a wave will drop their current weapon and re-enter the game at the start of the next wave. If the entire squad is wiped out, they will have to restart the game from the first round.

Each game can be configured to alter the length and difficulty of the various waves. The number of creatures in the enemy waves are based on the number of players in the game, increasing in numbers if more players join the game in progress. All but the weakest enemies have some special attack that can inflict significant damage on a player. A feature called "zed time" awards particularly gory kills, such as headshots, with slow-motion, even in multiplayer mode.

Alex Quick, the lead level designer and texture artist, stated that "there are a whole bunch of ideas on the drawing board that we can add in after launch, including the 'Story' mode from the mod, for instance." A software development kit (SDK) and level editor are included to aid in the creation of modifications and levels.

== Plot ==
The game takes place in London, England. Horzine Biotech, a biotechnology company, is contracted to conduct experiments of a military nature involving mass cloning and genetic manipulation. Something goes horribly wrong during the process of the experimentation, and human subjects begin to exhibit grotesque mutations and disfigurement. They become increasingly hostile, and eventually overrun the internal security forces of the corporation.

Hours later, the first waves of the specimens break out onto the surface, disrupting a peace protest outside the well-known military contractor. Despite the best efforts of the local police, the civilians are quickly overwhelmed and consumed by the seemingly endless supply of clones now streaming from the gaping maw of Horzine Biotech's headquarters. Having escaped their sterile prison, the creatures begin to fan out to neighboring areas, devouring the helpless citizens of London while the Metropolitan Police fruitlessly attempt to fight back.

Desperate to contain the outbreak from reaching overseas as planned by the mutated and cybernetically enhanced scientist Dr. Kevin "The Patriarch" Clamely, the British government quickly begins to organize ragtag teams of surviving British Army soldiers and Special Branch police officers to fight back against the hordes of mutated "specimens." The player takes the role of a member of one of these teams as they partake in a variety of missions in and around the city of London.

== Development ==
Killing Floor was originally a total conversion mod for the game Unreal Tournament 2004, first released in 2005. The lead developer Alex Quick was first approached by Tripwire Interactive about porting Killing Floor to their game Red Orchestra: Ostfront 41-45, but Quick did not follow through. A few years later, when their user base started to dwindle, Quick contacted Tripwire again to negotiate the port to Red Orchestra, and its distribution via Steam—similar to what Tripwire had already done with another Red Orchestra mod Mare Nostrum—and then later, the retail game. The mod version had its fifth and final official update in July 2008.

The full Killing Floor retail version was announced in March 2009. With the assistance of the original mod team, Tripwire would be the new developer. The game was released on 14 May 2009 after about three months of work by a crew of around ten developers.

A cross-promotion between Killing Floor and Team Fortress 2 was announced in December 2010. Killing Floor added a pyro skin to the game, while TF2 added a gas mask and tie for the pyro to wear. Any players who bought the game before December 14, 2010 received the TF2 items in vintage quality while a unique quality was given if bought between December 14 and January 4, 2011.

In 2012, with the launch of the Linux Steam version, the original non-Steam servers were closed and the game was made a Steam exclusive.

A late 2012 patch introduced support for the Steam Workshop; a distribution platform for user-made content functioning via the Steam client. In mid-2013, a new mode called "Objective Mode" was added, where the player team would be tasked with completing specific objectives over the course the various waves in addition to outright survival.

== Reception ==
Reception

Aggregate scores
Aggregator	Score
GameRankings	72.67% (24 reviews)
Metacritic	72/100 (30 reviews)

Review scores
Publication	Score
Eurogamer	7/10
GameSpot	7.5/10
IGN	7.5/10

Killing Floor was the top-selling game on Steam shortly after it was released (as of May 19, 2009). During the PlayStation Experience event in December 2014, Tripwire Interactive announced that Killing Floor had sold almost 3 million copies on PC.

Killing Floor has won a number of awards including Overall Best PC Game of 2009 in Voodoo Extreme's Reader Choice Awards. It also won 2 other categories in Voodoo Extreme's Reader's Choice Awards: Best PC Shooter of 2009 and Best PC Game Expansion or DLC of 2009.

Eurogamer commented that "though not perfect", it was "clever and relatively cheap". GameSpot commented that the game graphics compared poorly with contemporary shooters, and that the voice acting was bad, but considered that the sound effects were very good, and that despite its flaws, "you can't help but enjoy it." Some reviewers also considered that the lack of any real plot or aim for the players other than killing specimens, the small number of existing maps, and the repetitiveness of the gameplay reduced its replay value. Killing Floor has a Metacritic score of 72/100.

The sequel, Killing Floor 2, was released in November 2016 for Windows and PlayStation 4 and August 2017 for Xbox One.

As of May 2019, the Killing Floor series had sold more than 10 million units combined, with total revenues over US$100 million.

== See also ==
- List of video games derived from modifications
