= Uppsala University – Campus Gotland =

Coordinates: 57°38′21″N 18°17′18″E

- Uppsala universitet – Campus Gotland
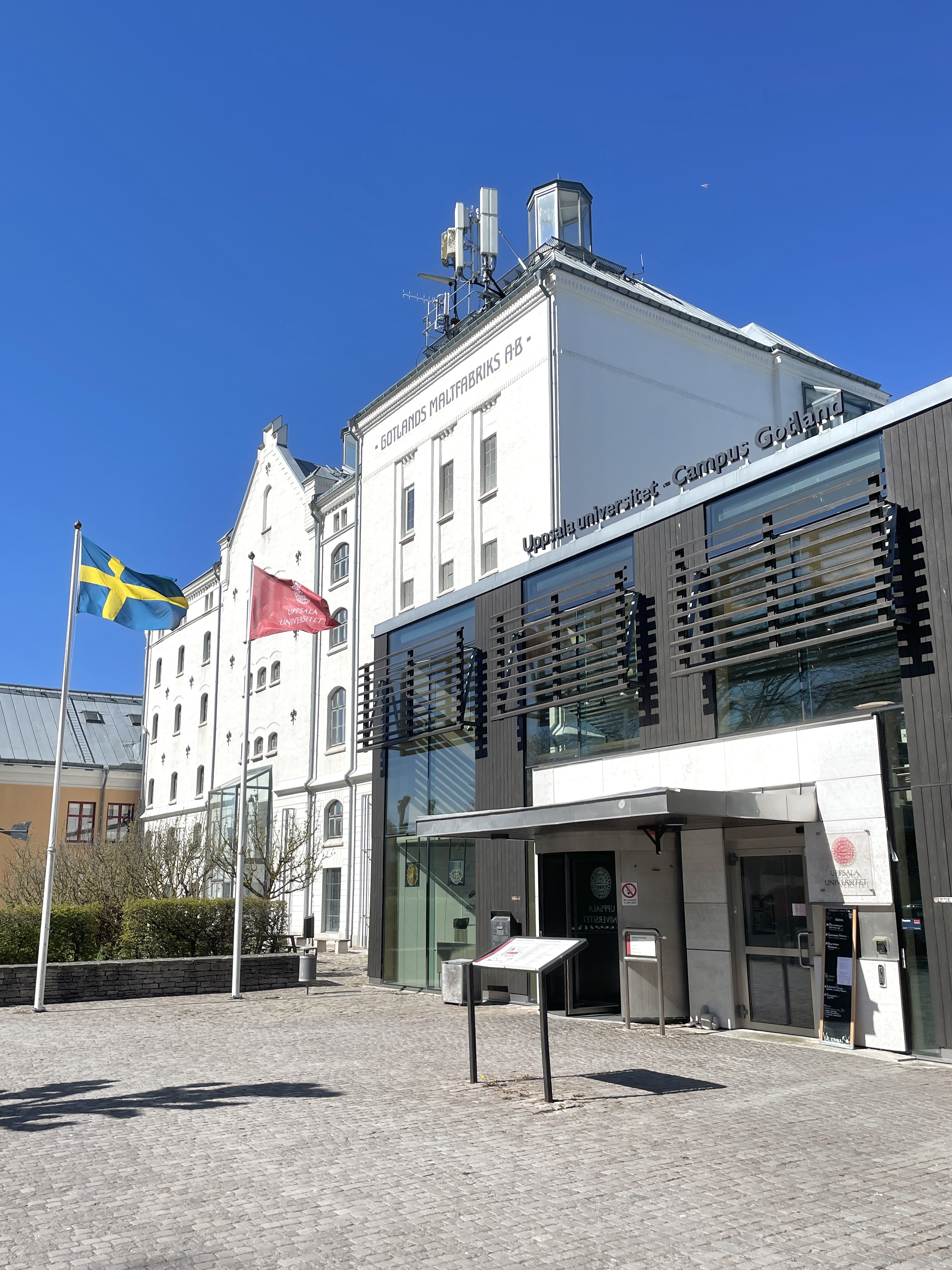
- Former names: University of Gotland
- Type: Satellite campus
- Established: 1998
- Parent institution: Uppsala University
- Students: 4,300
- Location: Visby, Gotland, Sweden
- Website: www.campusgotland.uu.se

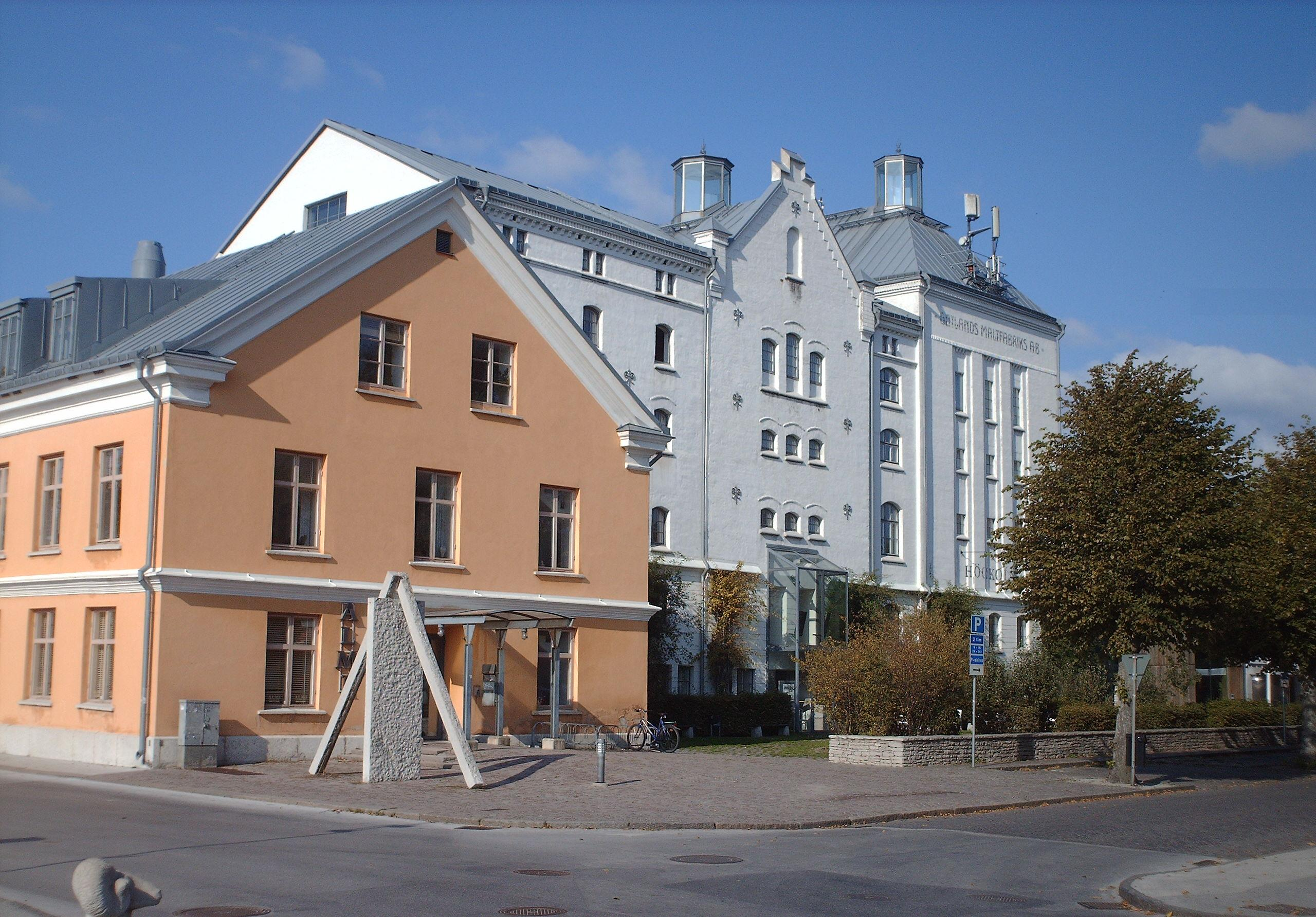
Some parts of the college is situated in old industrial buildings.

Uppsala University – Campus Gotland (Swedish: Uppsala universitet – Campus Gotland) is a campus of Uppsala University and a former university college (högskola) previously known in English as University of Gotland (Swedish: Högskolan på Gotland). It is located in Visby on the Baltic island of Gotland, Sweden. The school became a part of Uppsala University on 1 July 2013, and has been known as 'Uppsala University – Campus Gotland' since then.

The university college was originally established in 1998 and had around 4,300 registered students in 2007, many of them part-time and distance students. The main building which used to be an old Whiskey distillery is located in the central part of Visby, between the city marina and the Almedalen park. The Rindi Student Union, which organises the students, has its own building, called Rindi-borgen.

The Gotland Game Conference is held annually in June, where campus students show games, movies, and animations produced in the last year.

== See also ==
- List of colleges and universities in Sweden
