= Red Orchestra: Ostfront 41–45 =

2006 video game

- Developer: Tripwire Interactive
- Publisher: Bold Games
- Engine: Unreal Engine 2 (2.5 Build 3339)
- Platforms: Microsoft Windows, Linux, OS X
- Release: Windows: NA: March 14, 2006; EU: June 23, 2006; Linux: WW: November 29, 2012; OS X: WW: April 4, 2013
- Genre: Tactical first-person shooter
- Mode: Multiplayer

Red Orchestra: Ostfront 41–45 is a 2006 multiplayer tactical first-person shooter video game based on its predecessor Red Orchestra: Combined Arms. After winning the Make Something Unreal contest, the team behind the original Red Orchestra started the game studio Tripwire Interactive and developed Red Orchestra: Ostfront 41–45 as their first project.

Set on the Eastern Front during World War II between 1941 and 1945, Red Orchestra: Ostfront 41–45 depicts the struggle between Soviet and German forces. The game's creators, Tripwire Interactive, developed the game out of the previous Unreal Tournament 2004 mod, Red Orchestra: Combined Arms.

As of April 2009, the game has sold around 400,000 copies.

== Gameplay ==
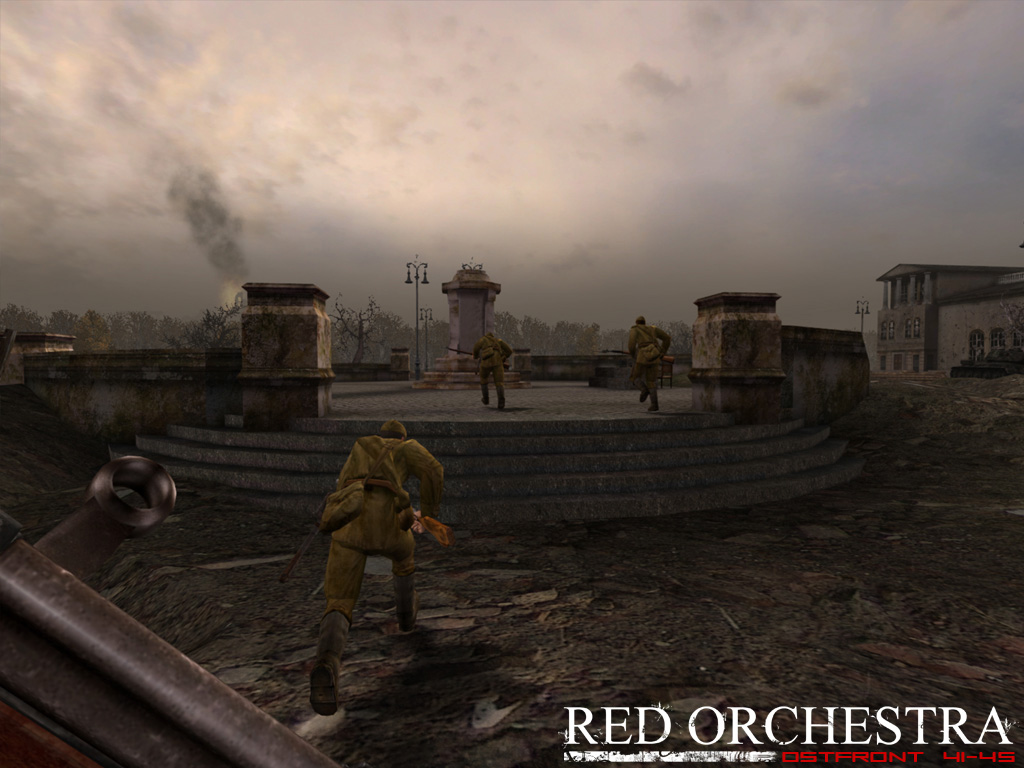
Red Orchestra gameplay

Red Orchestra concentrates mostly on the multiplayer aspect of the game, although there is a singleplayer "Practice" mode available. Red Orchestra: Ostfront 41–45 features an advanced ballistics system for both small arms and tank rounds – incorporating bullet drop, flight time, and tanks with more realistic armor properties than most games (featuring: penetration and deflection, in relation to range and projectile trajectory angle). The player's movements are realistically modeled, giving them the ability to lie and move prone, sprint (while standing or crouching) and to deploy machine guns on objects.

Red Orchestra is notable for its emphasis on realism in comparison to other World War II-based FPS games. There is no "crosshair" for a player to aim with in the middle of their screen; instead, the player must either aim down the three-dimensional iron sights, or aim from the hip using the game's free-aim system. The former requires compensating for the breathing of the character and natural sway from holding the gun, while the latter is much quicker but accurate only at very short range. The player must also keep track of their ammo usage mentally unlike many other FPS games, most of which use an ammunition counter. Additionally, the player's health status is not represented by "health points" as many other games use, but by a diagram of the player's body with reddened sections that show where he has been wounded; there is no way to recover from wounds, although after a brief period of time, the player will function at 100% again. Receiving wounds will temporarily slow the player down, especially if they receive a wound to the legs or feet; receiving a wound to the hands causes the player to drop their currently held weapon on the ground. Rifles usually kill players in one shot if they connect with the torso or head.

Vehicle support is also a prominent feature of the game. The player can operate the combat vehicles as one of the crew members. Most tanks, for example, can accommodate up to three crew members (a driver, a commander and a machine-gunner) to make them fully effective in close city fighting, however it is easy to crew a tank solo and simply switch to different positions as needed. When grouped together in a vehicle, all players in the vehicle receive points for their actions and for the actions of their fellow crew members; for example, if a player is driving a tank and the tank commander destroys an enemy tank, both the player and the commander will receive the appropriate number of points for that kill. When operating a tank solo, the player can only perform one of the roles at a time; this prevents a solo player from being able to fire, move and reload all at the same time (reloading is a task performed by the commander). The game also features artillery support in some maps which can be utilized by both squad leaders and tank commanders.

=== Maps ===
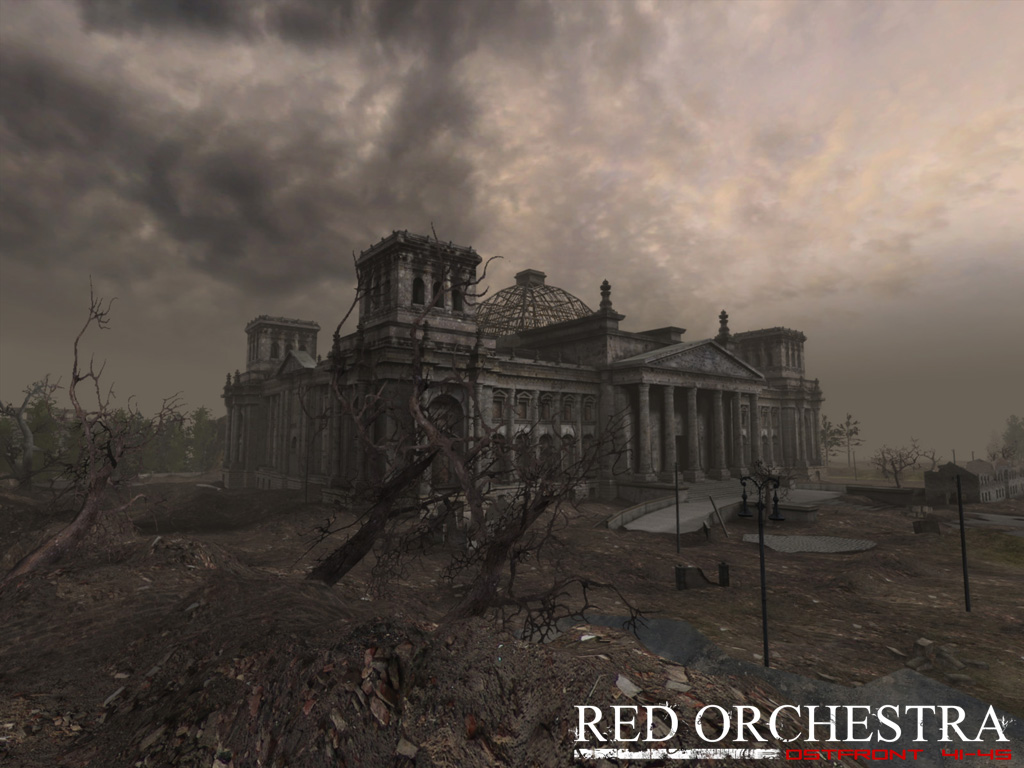
Red Orchestra environment depicting the German Reichstag

Red Orchestra features 16 official maps and 10 community-made maps supported by the developers. The Red Orchestra SDK, though never gone beyond beta version, has allowed the production of hundreds of user-created maps.

Red Orchestra features several different map types. Infantry maps focus on infantry combat, but can occasionally include APCs. Tank maps focus on tank combat. Combined Arms features gameplay which makes the coordination of infantry and armor its focal point. However, in many maps only when something on the map such as a wall or a fence is part of an objective or blockade can it be interacted with. The maps feature many broken buildings and vehicles as well as propaganda posters and resupply areas to add to the realism.

=== Red Orchestra: Combined Arms ===
Red Orchestra: Combined Arms is a tactical first-person shooter total conversion for Unreal Tournament 2004 and previously for Unreal Tournament 2003 originally developed by an independent international mod team, set on the Eastern Front during World War II.

The Red Orchestra developers, Tripwire Interactive, entered the NVIDIA Make Something Unreal Contest, with a grand prize of free Unreal Engine 2.5 and 3.0 licenses. The Combined Arms aspect of the game in version 3.0 was brought about by heavy suggestion that vehicles should be included to secure progression in the MSUC. Further refinement of the Red Orchestra total conversion led to version 3.3, the last version of the mod.

On Monday November 21, 2005, Tripwire Interactive announced that they would be releasing Red Orchestra: Ostfront 41–45 over Steam, Valve's digital content distribution platform. The game was released on Tuesday March 14, 2006, on the Steam network.

Loki installers for Linux gamers supplies a Linux installer for the original Red Orchestra: Combined Arms modification. It is made to work with the Linux port of Unreal Tournament 2004, and has an installer for both the original mod and the Summer Offensive Map Pack Addon.

It is notable for its emphasis on realism in comparison to other World War II-based FPSs. Unlike most FPSs, there is little on-screen information. There are no crosshairs in the middle of the screen; instead, the player must aim using simulated three-dimensional iron sights, compensating for the breathing of the character and natural sway from holding the gun. The player must also mentally keep track of ammo usage, unlike in games such as Counter-Strike which use an ammunition counter. Health status is not represented by points, but by a diagram of the player's body with reddened sections that show where they have been wounded. The bolt-action rifles in the game can often kill a player in one shot if rounds connect with any part of the torso or head. Semi-automatic rifles, such as the SVT-40 and Gewehr 43, are also capable of killing in one shot.

== Critical reception ==
Reception

Aggregate score
Aggregator	Score
Metacritic	81/100

Review scores
Publication	Score
GameSpot	7.9/10
GameSpy	4/5
IGN	8.5/10
PC Gamer (UK)	83%
PC Gamer (US)	74%
PC Zone	78%
X-Play	2/5
The Sunday Times	5/5

The PC version received "favorable" reviews according to the review aggregation website Metacritic.

Red Orchestra won Computer Games Magazine's 2004 "Best Mod" award.

Ostfront 41–45 was a runner-up for Computer Games Magazine's list of the top 10 computer games of 2006.

== Sequel ==
Tripwire Interactive released Red Orchestra 2: Heroes of Stalingrad in September 2011.
