= Indie Game Challenge =

American video game award competition

The Indie Game Challenge was an American award competition run in conjunction between the Academy of Interactive Arts & Sciences (AIAS), GameStop and The Guildhall at Southern Methodist University (SMU) to support independent video game development. Started in 2009, the competition highlighted ten to twelve independent games, with winning games receiving monetary rewards in addition to the award. The ceremonies were held during the annual D.I.C.E. Summit, during which the finalists are able to demonstrate their games to the press. The competition has not been held since the 2012 D.I.C.E. Summit.

== Concept ==
The awards were created by AIAS, Gamestop and the Guildhall to promote innovation in gaming from independent development. Mike Hogan, senior vice-president of marketing for Gamestop, cited the need for "new, cutting edge game developers who continue to stretch the boundaries and imaginations of gamers" in the industry, and hoped that the awards would "stimulate a new generation of game developers". The competition was designed to offer both monetary and scholarship prizes, valued up to $300,000.

The Challenge accepts games in playable, near-complete versions (including beta software) and, for games that have been released, limits such entries to those that have earned less than $100,000 prior to the competition. The Challenge allows entries for games that have already been submitted to other game contests. Once the judges have selected the finalists, a public vote for "Gamer's Choice" is started among the finalists for a $10,000 prize. The finalists are invited to the D.I.C.E. Summit, giving them exposure to major video game publishers and journalists, a lucrative opportunity for independent developers. After the major awards have been announced, the judges then select finalists to give graduate scholarships to SMU.

The first year of the Challenge drew more than 250 entries.

== Finalists and winners ==
=== 2010 ===
Finalists

- AaAaAA!!! – A Reckless Disregard for Gravity - Dejobaan Games
- Altitude - Nimbly Games
- Climb to the Top of the Castle - TwO Bros. Games
- Cogs - Lazy 8 Studios
- Dreamside Maroon - Terraced
- Fieldrunners - Subatomic Studio
- Galactic Arms Race - Evolutionary Complexity Research Group at UCF
- Gear - Team 3
- Miegakure - Marc ten Bosch
- Vessel - Strange Loop Games
- Waker - Poof Productions
- Zeit² - Brightside Games

Winners

- Grand Prize Award (Professional) - Cogs ($100,000 award)
- Grand Prize Award (Non-professional) - Gear ($100,000 award)
- Technical Achievement - Altitude ($2,500 award)
- Achievement in Art Direction - Cogs ($2,500 award)
- Achievement in Gameplay - Cogs ($2,500 award)
- Gamer's Choice Award - Altitude ($10,000 award)

=== 2011 ===
Finalists

- Confetti Carnival - SpikySnail Games
- Fortix 2 - Nemesys Games
- Hazard: The Journey of Life - Alexander Bruce
- Inertia - Team Hermes
- Limbo - Playdead
- Monaco: What's Yours is Mine - Pocketwatch Games
- Q.U.B.E. - Toxic Games
- Solace - One Man Down
- Spirits - Spaces of Play
- Subsonic - Team Height Advantage
- Symon - ZZZ Games
- Vanessa Saint-Pierre Delacroix & Her Nightmare - Bad Pilcrow

Winners

- Grand Prize Winner (Professional): Limbo ($100,000 prize)
- Grand Prize Winner (Non-professional): Inertia ($100,000 prize)
- Kongregate Award: Symon
- Technical Achievement: Inertia ($2,500 prize)
- Achievement in Art Direction: Limbo ($2,500 prize)
- Achievement in Gameplay: Inertia ($2,500 prize)
- Gamer's Choice Award: Inertia ($10,000 prize)

=== 2012 ===
Finalists

- Atom Zombie Smasher - Blendo Games
- The Bridge - Ty Taylor and Mario Castaneda
- Closure - Eyebrow Interactive
- Demolition Inc. - Zeroscale
- The Dream Machine - Team Dream
- The Fourth Wall - Team Pig Trigger
- Nitronic Rush - Team Nitronic
- Paradox Shift - Paradox Shift
- The Swapper - Facepalm Games
- Symphony - Empty Clip Studios

Winners

- Grand Prize Winner: Closure ($100,000 prize)
- Technical Achievement: Symphony ($2,500 prize)
- Achievement in Gameplay: The Bridge ($2,500 prize)
- Achievement in Art Direction: The Bridge ($2,500 prize)
- GameStop PC Digital Download Award: Symphony
- Gamer's Choice Award: Nitronic Rush ($2,500 prize)

== Indefinite hiatus ==
On December 15, 2012, game journalist website Polygon published an article with the following statement from Gamestop:

"The 2012 - 13 Indie Game Challenge (IGC) will be on hiatus while we take time to analyze ways to promote and celebrate the independent game movement. We have been committed and continue to be committed to supporting the independent game developer community. Post-DICE 2013 we will have more to share."

As of October 2023, the competition has not returned.

== See also ==
- PitchYaGame
