= Drunken Robot Pornography =

2014 first-person shooter game

- Developer: Dejobaan Games
- Publisher: Dejobaan Games
- Platforms: Windows, Linux
- Release: WW: 19 February 2014
- Genre: First-person shooter
- Mode: Single-player

Drunken Robot Pornography is a 2014 first-person shooter game developed and published by Dejobaan Games.

== Gameplay ==
Drunken Robot Pornography is a first-person shooter game.

== Plot ==
In the future, in Boston Massachusetts, wearing a robot suit, the player character is a gladiator who fights in the arena to acquire badges and some email messages.

== Development and release ==
Drunken Robot Pornography was developed and published by the American indie developer Dejobaan Games. Dejobaan Games previously developed The Wonderful End of the World (2008) and AaaaaAAaaaAAAaaAAAAaAAAAA!!! — A Reckless Disregard for Gravity (2009).

The game was first announced on 1 April 2010 as an April fool's Joke. It was released worldwide on 19 February 2014.

== Reception ==
Reception

Aggregate score
Aggregator	Score
Metacritic	66/100

Review scores
Publication	Score
Destructoid	7.5
Eurogamer	8/10
IGN	4/10
USgamer	3.5/5

Drunken Robot Pornography received mixed or average reviews according to review aggregator Metacritic, based on 6 reviews.
