= Sjoerd =

Sjoerd (Dutch pronunciation: [ɕuːrt]) is a Dutch masculine given name of West Frisian origin. It is derived via Sieuwerd from the Germanic Sigiward ("victory warden"). Sjoerd gained some popularity as a baby name between 1975 and 2005. The spelling Sjoert is far less common.

== Notable people named Sjoerd ==
- Sjoerd Ars (born 1984), Dutch footballer
- Sjoerd Bax (born 1996), Dutch cyclist
- Sjoerd De Jong, Dutch/Belgian video game level designer
- Pieter Sjoerd Gerbrandy (1885–1961), Dutch politician of the Anti Revolutionary Party (ARP)
- Sjoerd van Ginneken (born 1992), Dutch racing cyclist
- Sjoerd Hamburger (born 1983), Dutch rower who competes in the single scull
- Sjoerd Hoekstra (born 1959), Dutch rower
- Sjoerd Hofstra (1898–1983), Dutch sociologist and anthropologist working in Africa
- Sjoerd Hoogendoorn (born 1991), Dutch volleyball player
- Sjoerd Huisman (1986– 2013), Dutch marathon speed skater
- Sjoerd Janssen (born 1984), Dutch electronic dance musician, half of the Showtek duo
- Sjoerd Joustra (1916–2001), Dutch architect
- Sjoerd Koppert (born 1950), Dutch-born recording engineer and producer now based in California
- Sjoerd Kuyper (born 1952), Dutch poetry and prose writer
- Sjoerd Marijne (born 1974), Dutch field hockey player and coach
- Sjoerd Bertus Mooi Wilten (1913–1965), Dutch swimmer
- Sjoerd Overgoor (born 1988), Dutch footballer
- Sjoerd Potters (born 1974), Dutch VVD politician
- Georges (Sjoerd) Romme (born 1960), Dutch professor in organizational theory
- Sjoerd de Roos (1877–1962), Dutch type designer, book cover designer and artist
- Sjoerd Wiemer Sjoerdsma (born 1981), Dutch diplomat and politician
- Sjoerd Soeters (born 1947), Dutch postmodern architect
- Sjoerd Vollebregt (born 1954), Dutch sports sailor
- Sjoerd Wartena (born 1939), Dutch rower
- Sjoerd Wiarda (1399–1410), the fifteenth potestaat of Friesland, now a province of the Netherlands
- Sjoerd Winkens (born 1983), Dutch footballer
- Sjoerd van Ginneken (born 1992), Dutch racing cyclist

== Notable people with variants of the name ==
- Sjoerdje Faber (1915–1998), Dutch long-distance speed skater
- Sjoert Brink (born 1981), Dutch bridge player
