= Development of BioShock Infinite =

Development of 2013 video game

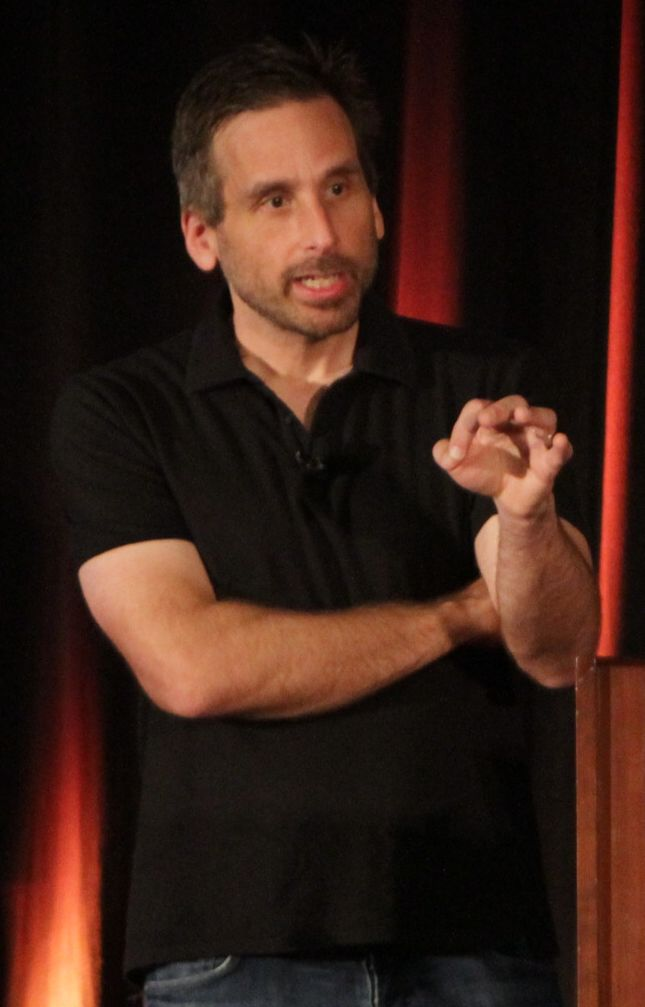
Ken Levine, the creative director and lead writer for BioShock Infinite

The development of BioShock Infinite began after BioShock's release in August 2007. The five-year development, led by studio Irrational Games, began under the moniker "Project Icarus". Irrational's creative lead, Ken Levine was inspired by events at the turn of the 20th century and the expansion of the concept of American Exceptionalism set by the 1893 World's Fair in Chicago. His story took these events to create a tale set in 1912 where the player, as former Pinkerton agent Booker DeWitt, is charged with rescuing a young woman, Elizabeth, who has been kept aboard the floating city of Columbia in the middle of a civil war between its founder Father Zachary Comstock and the Vox Populi, the underclass revolting against him.

Though development initially started in Rapture, the underwater city of the first two BioShock games, the team found this to be too limiting and created the open-aired city of Columbia that allowed for expanded opportunities for combat. The Irrational team referenced much of the media from the turn of the century, as well as more recent events such as the various "Occupy" protests, to shape the game's story and world. Central to the game was the character of Elizabeth, whom Levine wanted to be more of a companion akin to Half-Life 2's Alyx Vance rather than an escort mission. Levine took a novel approach for his story by bringing the voice actors for Booker and Elizabeth, Troy Baker and Courtnee Draper, respectively, into the studio to develop the characters and help refine the story.

Irrational and 2K Games used a number of different marketing approaches to promote the game. They worked with various gaming magazines to create promotional artwork reflecting the turn of the 20th century, and developed tie-in video clips teasing the game's mythology in the style of In Search Of.... A standalone browser game, BioShock Infinite: Industrial Revolution, was developed by Lazy 8 Studios under Irrational's direction to promote the main game and provide the player with in-game rewards. Additional promotional media included an art book, figurines of various characters in the game, a prequel novella, a board game, and a contest to have the winner have their name used within the game. 2K Games published BioShock Infinite on 26 March 2013 for PlayStation 3, Windows, and Xbox 360 (Note: An OS X port was released on 29 August 2013 by Aspyr.) as the third game in the BioShock series. Though the game was a commercial success, Irrational would downsize shortly after releasing a final piece of Infinite downloadable content and ultimately rebrand itself.

== Development ==
Irrational worked in secrecy on BioShock Infinite for two-and-a-half years since completing the original BioShock prior to its announcement; with the game announced as going gold on February 19, 2013, about five years of development had been put into the game, with about 200 people involved in the process. 2K Games gave them the freedom to develop their sequel at will. Though The New York Times claimed that the game cost an estimated $100 million to develop with up to an additional $100 million for marketing, Levine countered this assertion though the true cost of development has not been affirmed.

One issue at the start of Infinite's development was reassembling the Irrational team. 2K had moved some of Levine's team, including Jon Chey, to 2K Marin to help develop BioShock 2. Levine had considered he and Chey to be "the yin and yang of the organization", with Chey handling production matters while Levine worked on the creative side. As such, Levine had to find people to help replace these absences, but felt that he never really had rebuilt Irrational for development of Infinite, and there was a schism in the company throughout the development period. The larger expectations of Infinite required Levine to manage a team of 150 developers, which he was not able to get to know personally as he had been able to for BioShock. The stress of having many more responsibilities with the larger team took its toll on Levine. After the game was released, Levine had looked back over the past five years and found how much he had aged, and believed the period had affected his health and his personal relationships. He opted to leave Irrational Games, and started a separate smaller project.

Though BioShock Infinite shares the same name with the other two games, Levine has stated that this is a new direction, and was coy to answer if they shared the same universe. Levine referred to the term BioShock not as a specific location or setting, but a concept conjoined by two ideas: the exploration of a fantastical setting, and the use of a large number of tools and abilities in creative manners to survive. Along with the System Shock games, which Levine and other Irrational developers had worked on, the titles share the same idea of a "component of learning about a new place" and shocking the player into discovering more of the setting, according to Levine. Levine affirmed that with the similarities between the games, "It would be dishonest to say this is not BioShock". Similarly, Timothy Gerritsen, director of product development, stated they wanted to keep the feel of the BioShock experience but still consider Infinite to be a new intellectual property; as a means to sever the implied connection to the previous games, the teaser purposely shows a Big Daddy figurine being crushed at the onset. This was furthered by the selection of the word Infinite as part of the title, to reflect the "many possibilities" they wanted to explore with the BioShock concept. The game does not completely eschew BioShock, as certain elements like the sound effects representing the player's health or for gaining new quests from BioShock are reused without modification in Infinite; Levine stated that they had worked these common elements as former BioShock players would already understand their impact, and that they had spent a great detail of time during BioShock to get these elements right and felt no need to reinvent the sounds again. Further, the introduction of Infinite purposely mimics several elements from BioShock's opening: one example given by writer Drew Holmes is the act of walking through a candle-lined water trough in a Columbia church to be baptized, which visually is similar to swimming through the flaming wreckage of the plane to reach the bathysphere terminus for Rapture. Levine said "it is a new thing, but it's also a continuation of the things we've done before" and has a shared heritage, in a similar manner to Final Fantasy sequels.

=== Story and setting ===
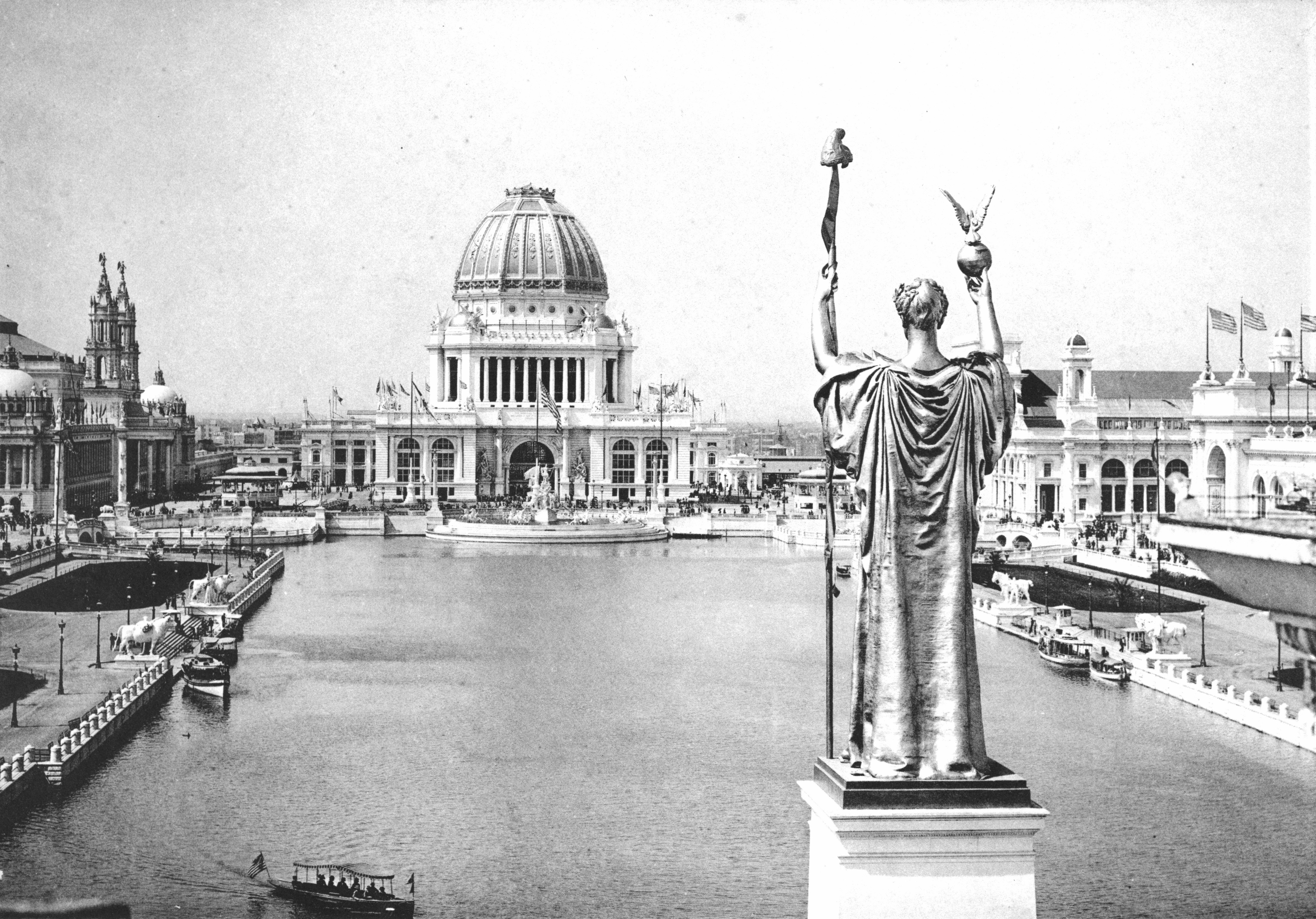
The 1893 World's Fair in Chicago, considered to have flourished the idea of American Exceptionalism, is a major influence on Infinite's story and the design of Columbia.

For the first six months of development, the team prototyped several possible ideas to brainstorm on what concepts would be effective for the next game. The team had originally considered reusing Rapture from the first two BioShock games, aware that Rapture would be synonymous with the BioShock name, and that players had reacted positively to exploring the underwater city, learning of its history, and having "the sense of the world, and being in that place". As they worked to determine the story and types of quests the player would undertake, they found themselves bored and struggling to come up with new ideas and feared that players would react the same. This prompted the team to consider an alternate setting despite this being a "terrifying" prospect in terms of project scope. Irrational had also considered placing events during the Renaissance, but upon the announcement of Assassin's Creed II in 2009 which took place during the same historical period, they dropped this idea. The idea of the air-city came early in the development. The open-air environment gave them an opportunity to use color schemes that sharply contrasted with the darker palettes that were a staple of their earlier games. Even then, their initial designs of the flying city were darker and closer to Art Nouveau, making the game world too claustrophobic and appearing similar to the city of Rapture. The period of American exceptionalism allowed them to create a brighter, expansive system.

According to Irrational's Ken Levine, the name "Columbia", in reference to the female figure that personifies the United States, and the idea of American exceptionalism did not come about until six to eight months before the game's reveal. An early concept was to depict a group of technology geeks against a band of luddites, but Levine found that such conflict exists "only in shades of reality" and wasn't compelling enough. Instead, the Irrational team recentered on the idea of American exceptionalism, a tangible concept that continues to be repeated throughout history. The idea came to Levine after watching a PBS documentary, America 1900, about the late 19th century, which quickly caught on with the rest of the team. In particular, Levine pointed to one quote of U.S. President William McKinley on the eve of the Philippine–American War, which spoke to the need of America to "uplift and civilize and Christianize" the natives of the Philippines. Though the accuracy of the quote is disputed, Irrational's lead artist Shawn Robinson noted that BioShock Infinite's goal is "not to teach any history", but felt such historical aspects helped to ground the work's fiction. Levine stated that in the same manner that BioShock was not built specifically around Objectivism, Infinite is not built around jingoism, but only uses the concepts to help set the stage to tell the story of individuals caught up in the conflicts. Another work that Levine took inspiration from was Erik Larson's The Devil in the White City about Dr. H. H. Holmes, the first recorded serial killer at the 1893 World's Fair in Chicago; Levine considered how the work gave "a great optimism and excitement for the future and one of this ominous feeling at the same time". Levine noted that in contrast to the character of Andrew Ryan from the first BioShock, where history had influenced some of his decisions, Booker and other characters have been directly involved with some of the aforementioned history, reflected in how these characters react to certain scenarios.

If you think about the founding principles of the United States, if you think about the Declaration of Independence and the Constitution and the Bill of Rights, what's interesting to me is how two different people can look at the same set of documents by a single group of writers and come away with entirely different opinions about what those writings mean-so different that they're willing to kill each other over them.

— Ken Levine, Irrational Games

Levine considered how the founding documents of the United States can be interpreted in several ways, leading to conflict between those that hold various interpretations of those ideals, leading to Infinite's different factions. Figureheads of the powers-that-be like Saltonstall are based on both historical and present-day nationalistic personalities, seeking to put the needs of America before others. One example given by Levine is President Theodore Roosevelt, whose ideals were highly influential during America's transformation in the early 20th century; Levine considered how Roosevelt willingly gave up office to fight during the Spanish–American War. On the other hand, the Vox Populi were based on historical factions that often splintered into small, independent groups that undertook violent actions, such as the Red Army Faction from the 1970s and the Animal Liberation Front and Earth Liberation Front of present day. During the course of the game's development period, the series of "Occupy" protests occurred across several cities; Levine, comparing these protests to other historical ones already incorporated into Columbia's history, used the real-time events to refine the game's story. Specifically, due to the nature of the various decentralized groups involved with the "Occupy" protests, Levine was able to define how the Vox Populi group would grow from its haphazard beginnings. Levine reflected that despite the game's earlier setting, many of the modern day political turmoil calls back to similar tactics and behavior used in the early days of America's democracy, and thus provided a means to flesh out these aspects within the game.

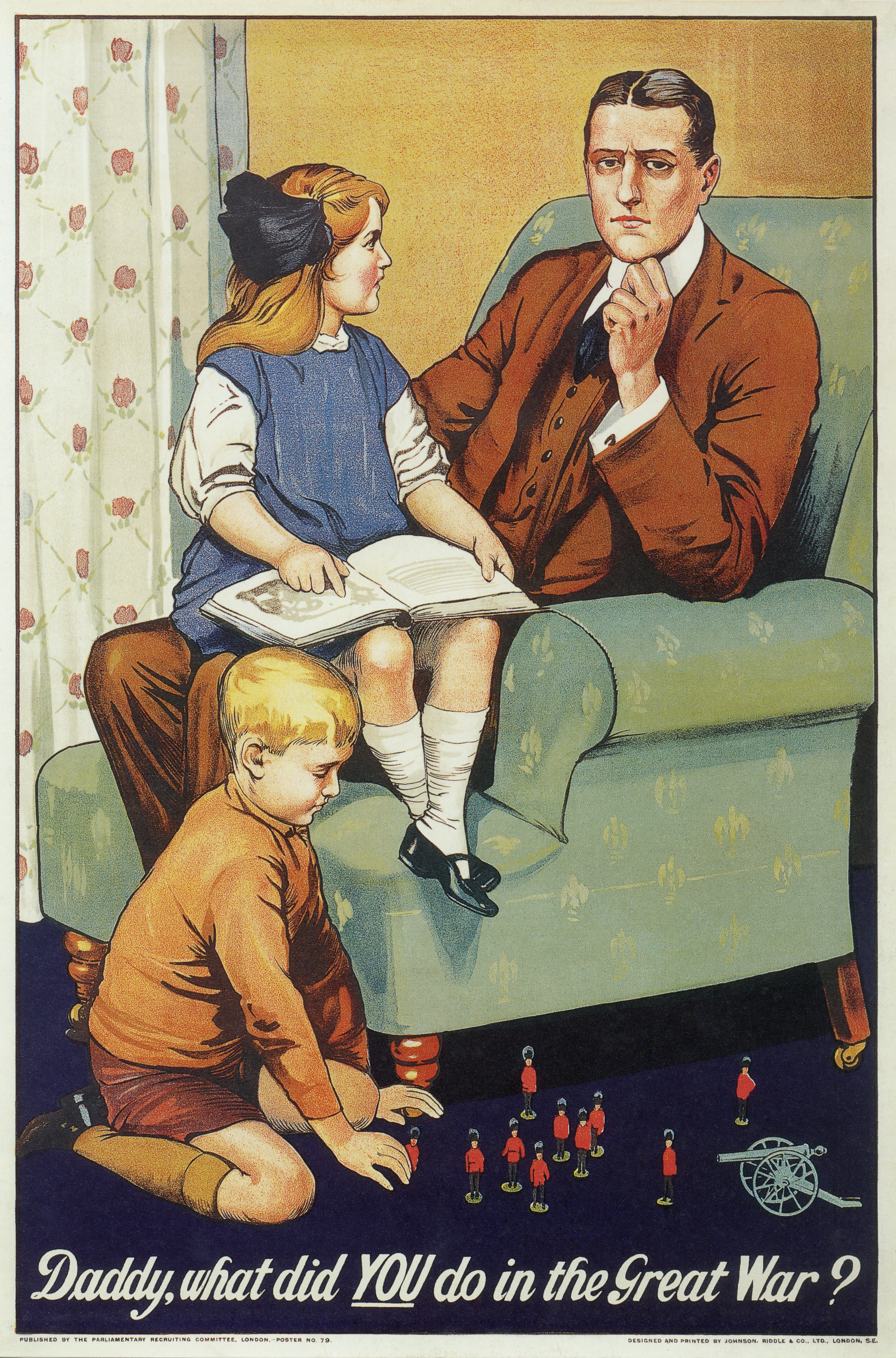
Propaganda such as the British poster for World War I recruitment (left) inspired much of Columbia's propaganda (right) developed by Irrational.

Irrational Games brought another 2K Games subsidiary, 2K Marin, aboard to help build out the architecture and details of Columbia. Irrational's director of design Bill Gardner stated that the scope of Columbia was much more expansive than Rapture in terms of virtual space, using an example of the whole of one BioShock level, the "Medical Pavilion", able to easily fit into a beach on Columbia, a fraction of the overall level there, and thus necessitating the additional help. The Irrational team reviewed much of the American culture and propaganda at the turn of the 20th century, using the artwork to create some of the in-game posters. Levine commented that at the time, such imagery was "really subtle", and considered that their re-envisioning of these posters within Columbia was "a great way to communicate ideas visually". Other sources of inspiration for the game's art included photographs from before and after the 1906 San Francisco earthquake, and from Sears-Roebuck catalogs from the turn of the century. Another source of inspiration for the art style was developed by considering Infinite to represent "The Fourth of July, 1912", just as BioShock resonated with the theme of "New Years Eve 1959". By selecting this hypothetical date, the team quickly identified films to draw imagery from, like The Music Man, Meet Me in St. Louis, and Hello, Dolly which exhibited ideal views of Americana at the turn of the 20th century. The bright, open-air environments of Columbia presented a challenge to the team to keep aspects of the horror genre within the game; Levine stated they took some inspiration from Stanley Kubrick's The Shining and David Lynch's Blue Velvet, transforming an "antiseptic environment" into the "scariest ******* place [one's] ever seen". Other film inspirations for the game include: Angel Heart, Beauty and the Beast, O Brother, Where Art Thou? and There Will Be Blood.

The idea of using tears in the fabric of space-time was influenced by a similar story decision in BioShock. With Rapture set in the 1960, the Irrational team had looked to the scientific progress of James D. Watson and Francis Crick towards understanding DNA in 1953, and built the idea of ADAM and gene modification. For Infinite, the same concept was used with the development of quantum theory by Albert Einstein, Max Planck, and Werner Heisenberg that would later bore out in the Many Worlds Theory. Incorporating the use of tears was a challenge from the story standpoint but one that Levine enjoyed, noting that this leads to the impression of Booker being an unreliable narrator for the events of the game. One of the game demonstrations showed Elizabeth accidentally opening a tear into a 1980s setting after trying to revive a fallen horse. This setting was in contrast to their initial idea, a woodland glade, which Levine felt wasn't "striking or different enough" than the rest of Columbia. Instead, they borrowed assets from a previous project that, according to lead artist Shawn Robertson, Irrational was "literally about to throw away", finding the contrast and abrupt differences from the Columbia setting helped to emphasize the use of tears in the game. In regards to the ending, Levine has stated that the ending of Infinite is "like nothing you've experienced in a video game before"; the story purposely avoids a problem that arose from the original BioShock in which, after the death of Andrew Ryan before the last third of the game, "the story loses some of its steam".

=== Character development ===
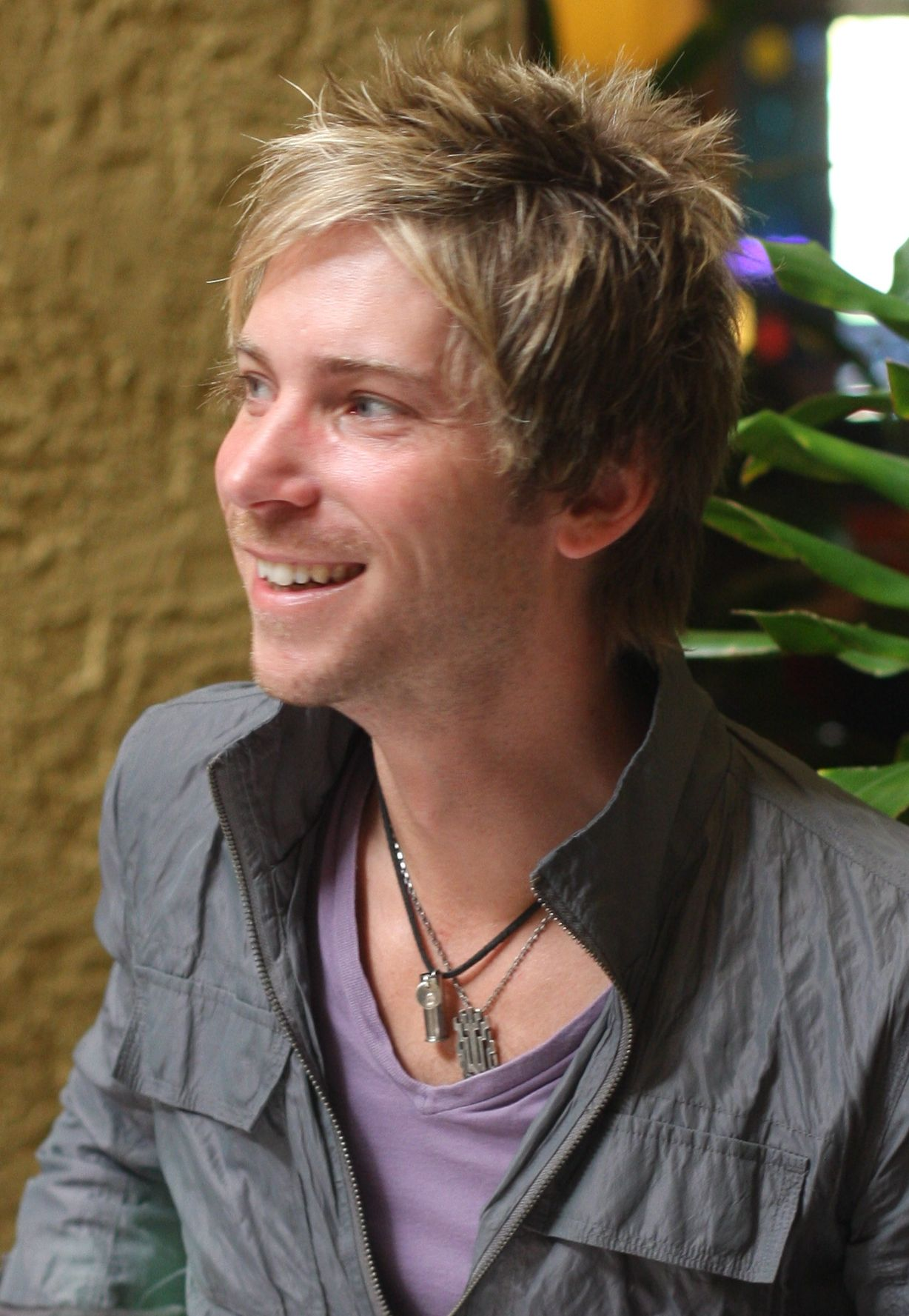
Veteran voice actor Troy Baker plays Booker DeWitt in BioShock Infinite.

Booker is voiced by veteran voice actor Troy Baker, while Elizabeth is voiced by actress Courtnee Draper. Baker and Draper's participation in the development process was atypical for most video games; instead of just coming in to record their lines, Levine considered them as collaborators on the story development process. The three spent a significant amount of time in the recording studio, improvising scenes and working on repeated recordings to try to find the right tone to present scripted dialog; such changes were then reflected appropriately in the game's story and dialog. Levine favorably contrasted Baker and Draper as "the genius and the novice" respectively; Baker had several previous roles in video game voice-overs, while Draper had none; the different levels of experience between the two helped to tighten the performances, the combination a "potent mix" according to Levine. Levine explained one case where Draper was struggling to give a convincing tearful performance when Elizabeth is having difficulty using her powers. Both Draper and Levine believed it would be helpful to have Baker provide Booker's loud, berating dialog alongside Draper to help Draper find the right emotional response to deliver for the scene. Levine considered the input of both actors of critical importance to be able to deliver a lot of information, both in words and emotion, in only a few lines of dialog. Levine also worked with the actors directly to script out specific scenes once they had gotten to know their characters before recording their voices. Despite working closely with Baker and Draper on characterization and creating dialog on the fly, Levine did not provide the actors with full knowledge of their characters' backstory or the overarching plot of the game prior to recording; according to Levine, this helped the actors to create the in-game connection between Booker and Elizabeth in a much more natural manner than reading with full knowledge of the script. Similarly, Levine had not told the developers on his team the whole story of BioShock Infinite, using the reveals to gauge their reactions and adjust the story as needed; this had created some strife in the team, as they would prefer working with full knowledge of the script, but Levine noted "that's not the way we present stuff to the gamer".

In the early development of Infinite, Elizabeth was designed to be more of a useful companion than a partner within the game; she would be able to perform tasks like picking locks that the player could not, but otherwise lacked a significant emotional bond. However, after showcasing the game at the 2011 E3 Convention, the Irrational team saw players react favorably to Elizabeth, and started to make her the player's partner for the game, expanding her abilities to accommodate this. This approach to Elizabeth was inspired by the character of Alyx Vance from Half-Life 2, a central element and an "emotional driver" to the game's story. Irrational wanted to expand on that concept, demonstrating how such a character would interact with talkative player-character, compared to the silent Gordon Freeman, and creating further emotional ties between the two characters. Levine also considered the characterization of the player-character Monkey and his non-playable companion Trip in the game, Enslaved: Odyssey to the West, as inspiration towards the story of Booker and Elizabeth. The plot revolves around changes that Elizabeth, Booker, and their relationship undergo as the player explores deeper into Columbia. Further, they wanted to avoid giving Elizabeth any of the same abilities that the player has; they rejected letting her use a gun, for example, as this would take away from the player's role in defeating the enemy. They gave Elizabeth additional abilities, such as being able to scrounge and toss supplies of ammunition and Salts to Booker, or to decode ciphers hidden around Columbia with codes found by Booker, that helped to connect her more emotionally to the player.

Elizabeth's character, particularly her relationship to her captor, the Songbird, is based on his experience with a former female companion that Levine had; she had told Levine that her previous relationship was abusive, but she would otherwise "make excuses for him [her former friend], all the time" and ultimately returned to him. Levine had altered this in Infinite, that while creating the abusive relation between Elizabeth and Songbird, Elizabeth desired to escape that, even if death was the only option; at one point in the game's preview material, Elizabeth is shown wrapping Booker's hands around her neck and convincing him to kill her while Songbird attempts to break into the building that they have secured themselves into. In response to discussions on Internet forums regarding the size and exposed nature of Elizabeth's breasts, Levine noted that part of their design for Elizabeth and her costume was to be able to recognize her from a distance given the open-space nature of the game and limited resolution. Levine stated that her costume is inspired by that of superheroes, using a simple color scheme that would help her to stand out in the colorful and complex landscapes.

The programming of the artificial intelligence for Elizabeth was considered a major technical challenge for Irrational, as they desired to give her as much near-human behavior in contrast to most other games where such companions are either highly scripted or given relatively simplistic pragmas to follow, and had little previous examples from other games to build on; Levine cited Half-Life 2's Alyx as the last "great AI companion". Irrational had previously developed AI routines for the Big Daddies and Little Sisters in BioShock that would allow them to roam and interact with the environment if otherwise left alone by the player; these routines were the basis of building out improved behavior for Elizabeth. The developers had spent much time improving these routines to give Elizabeth her own tendencies to look and move around as a real actor instead of a robotic non-player character, as to re-enforce her central role to the player. To this, Levine explained that they looked to the banter between the main characters in the Uncharted series by Naughty Dog. Levine praised the work that Naughty Dog had done, and felt he would be able to create the same with a more somber period piece. Some of Elizabeth's responses will be driven by a player's action (such as the aforementioned horse recovery scene), but other times, Elizabeth's actions will be on her own in response to the environment. Much of Columbia was seeded "room by room" with elements that Elizabeth will be interested in, comment on, and react to. However, as for the player not missing these elements, such actions would only be performed based on a number of factors, including whether the player was near and looking at Elizabeth, and the current tension of the game. This apparent curiosity serendipitously worked with Elizabeth's story, who after having been locked up for twelve years would be eager to see new things. Elizabeth's AI also monitors and tracks the player's behavior over time, such that the AI will attempt to predict when the player is moving and keep Elizabeth out of the line of fire. Programming Elizabeth's AI was a significant challenge to the Irrational team, and at several points during development the suggestion of cutting her from the game was brought up. Levine countered these suggestions, insisting on keeping her in the game. To manage this, a multidisciplinary subgroup called the "Liz Squad" reviewed the levels designed by others to assure that the presence of Elizabeth was accounted for across the game and to avoid situations where the level would delegate the character to simply hiding in a closet. On March 15, 2013, the full voice cast was announced by Irrational Games.

=== Technical and gameplay development ===
According to Levine, the team had to revolutionize their previous work on the BioShock game in order to realize Columbia, including both indoor and outdoor settings that take place thousands of feet above the ground. The original BioShock engine, a modified Unreal Engine 2.x, was inadequate for their vision, and so they chose to work with Unreal Engine 3, modifying it with their own lighting engine and means to simulate the movement and buoyancy of the buildings. The development team found that the implementation of open spaces created new gameplay options for the player, such as deciding between long-ranged attacks or finding a means to move in for short-range or melee combat. While Irrational had followed 2K Marin's work on BioShock 2, Infinite does not include any further improvements that 2K Marin had made on the original engine. According to Levine, all assets of Infinite are created from scratch.

One challenge facing Irrational was identified from BioShock, in which players, once equipped with specific plasmids and weapons, could complete the game without having to alter their weapons; Levine quotes the saying "When all you have is a hammer, everything looks like a nail" to describe how they found players were able to complete most of BioShock using the 'Electro Bolt' plasmid and a shotgun. Irrational wanted instead to create situations through Infinite's weapons and powers that allowed the player to progress to some point with certain combinations but then would be forced to learn new possibilities that Irrational had designed within the game. The vertical and open-air spaces of Columbia provide more opportunity to include various types of combat compared to the close-ranged limits of Rapture within the first BioShock. The team developed a variety of enemies that would have certain strengths and weakness that would force the player to experiment and work with all their available tools given to them. This was further enhanced by the inclusion of Elizabeth, who has powers that can be used in conjunction with Booker's to achieve more impressive results but that strain her powers and giving choice to the player as to how and when to use her abilities. Another aspect that Irrational had considered from BioShock was the way players opted in choosing whether to save or harvest the Little Sisters; according to writer Drew Holmes, because this choice simply affected the reward that players would receive, they would not consider the moral consequences of their actions, particularly with subsequent playthroughs of the game. While Infinite will offer such choices to the player, these will be less obvious and with initially ambiguous results, an example being the choice of throwing a baseball at an interracial couple or the barker at the start of the game.

The inclusion of Elizabeth also served to better extend Irrational's vision of storytelling first-person shooters and to avoid other tropes used in similar games that have become "long in the tooth" such as receiving information over a radio or from someone on the opposite side of a window; according to Levine, having Elizabeth as a person working aside the player-characters helps to make the game "feel more grounded in humanity". In contrast to the silent Jack from BioShock, the player character Booker is also given a voice, a decision to avoid complacency with the "silent protagonist" motif as well to have face-to-face interactions with other non-player characters instead of being told what to do over a radio or separated by a barrier.

The team wanted to capture the aspect of BioShock where not every non-player character would immediately be aggressive towards you; Levine discusses a situation in Infinite where the player character walks into a crowded bar and cannot immediately tell the disposition of the non-player characters towards the player. Levine compared this to the introduction of the Big Daddy in BioShock, giving the player several opportunities to view but not engage the characters so they would understand that there are several possible outcomes depending on what approach they used when they did have the ability to engage one. As Infinite contains numerous groups in internal conflict with each other, the player will be given the opportunity to learn how to utilize different non-player character agents to progress in the game. Irrational wanted to make sure consequences of the player's actions were reflected in the game; part of this is through the strain on Elizabeth when using her powers, but through altering the suspended city, they are able to change the environment in response to the player's choice and force the player to consider different tactics.

Earlier versions of the games had included Nostrums as gameplay elements, but these were replaced by equipable gear. Nostrums would have made permanent changes to the character and cannot be removed once used. They would have been available in two types, stable and unstable varieties, the latter referred to as "potlucks". Stable nostrums would have been expensive, but the player would know exactly what effect applying the nostrum would gain them. Unstable nostrums would be cheaper or found lying around the environment, but upon use, would require the player to select one of four random effects to alter their character, an idea inspired by Heroes of Might and Magic according to Levine. The Nostrum system was scrapped in favor of using gear as they found that the system was too similar to other ones that the player would have available in equipping their character, compared to the gear option. Similarly, earlier demonstrations of the game did not use Salt to power vigors, but instead each vigor would have a limited number of uses before it was exhausted. While more can be found around the game's environment, the player would have only been able to carry a limited number of vigors into battle, with more powerful vigors containing fewer charges.

The game's "1999 Mode" was a result of a conversation that Levine had with a college student after speaking at a college during the latter stages of Infinite's development; the student explained his disappointment with BioShock in that none of the choices the player makes in that game has long-lasting impact. Levine agreed with this statement and realized that giving permanence to the player's choices would make the game more interesting. Design director Bill Gardener also acknowledged that their approach within BioShock was part of the general trend in gaming over the last decade due to streamlining of games. Irrational Games validated the inclusion using an informal survey from fans of the studio, with 57% responding positively towards the idea. Levine compared the 1999 Mode similar to the idea of selecting a character class, and specializations would be a mutually exclusive choice; opting to be proficient in pistols would leave the character struggling to use any other weapon type. Elements of resource management were also critical to Levine; while the player can revive Booker upon death within the game, this will cost resources, and potentially lead to a case where the player can no longer afford the revitalization, forcing the player to load a save game. Levine wanted to also capture the flavor of games like Tom Clancy's Rainbow Six, where turning a corner carelessly could result in the character's death by a single bullet, creating a certain tension while traversing the level. The addition of the mode was late in the development cycle, requiring the Irrational Team to re-balance parts of the game for it, having to recall the design of "hard-core" games like System Shock 2 where the failure of the player would often lead to the game being over prematurely. The studio recognized that the average gamer would likely quit playing the game in such circumstances, and plan to hide access to the 1999 Mode in the game's menus, such as by using the Konami Code, as to prevent such gamers from accidentally stumbling upon it. The game was ultimately released with a variation on the Konami Code as the means to unlock 1999 Mode from the start, though the mode also becomes available after the player completes the game the first time.

After the previous installations of BioShock were found to have some issues with Windows computers, Levine stated that they have a "dedicated group" to make sure that Infinite "feels at home on [Windows computers]". The retail Windows version will ship on three DVD discs to accommodate higher-resolution textures beyond the consoles versions, and will support video cards capable of running DirectX 11 in addition to DirectX 10, allowing for further graphical improvements to the game. Levine further stated that the Windows version, enabled by Steamworks, will not use additional digital rights management software such as Games for Windows - Live or SecuRom.

The original BioShock received some criticism from PlayStation 3 owners, who found the port from the native Windows and Xbox 360 developed by a separate studio, Digital Extremes, to be lackluster. To address this, Irrational Games has stated that the PlayStation 3 version of Infinite would not be a port, as that version is being developed in-house simultaneously with the Windows and Xbox 360 versions. In addition, the PlayStation 3 version of the game will support stereoscopic 3D. BioShock Infinite will support the PlayStation Move motion controller. Though some reports believed that a new Move controller would be produced for the game based on information from Sony, 2K Games debunked these stories, stating that no new hardware is being developed for the game. The North American PlayStation 3 version of the game will include a copy of the original BioShock. Levine has expressed interest in a Wii U version of Infinite in light of what abilities the touchscreen controller can offer, but contends that the decision to develop for that platform is "really a discussion that the business people have and see if it makes sense for Nintendo, if it makes sense for Take Two". Aspyr helped to port Infinite to the OS X platform and was released on August 29, 2013.

=== Final years of development ===
The last years of Infinite's development were considered stressful according to many former Irrational developers. Once the game was announced in 2010 and on public display in 2011, there was pressure on the studio from the media and interested players to make sure the game delivered on its promises. Levine started asking 2K to help expand the Irrational team to speed up production around that time.

To get 2K to buy into expanded hiring, Levine proposed multiplayer modes for the game as to extend its product life, even though he initially had no plans for this. While the team had early on experimented with concepts for a multiplayer component, Levine had originally stated that they would only proceed forward if it had elements not otherwise found in multiplayer games like Halo.

With 2K agreeing to bring on more staff, at least two multiplayer modes were in development. One mode was a co-operative mini-game similar to tower defense having the player characters miniaturized within an old-time arcade machine to defend against waves of enemies. This mode was cancelled early on to focus on a four player co-operative mode tentatively titled "Spec-Ops", similar to the mode of the same name from Call of Duty: Modern Warfare. The four players would have worked their way through levels from the single player game to complete missions under certain requirements. Further development on "Spec-Ops" was also eventually dropped.

Some of these new hires that came in found that while there was a lot of ideas already behind the game, there was still no core game yet built about this time. One programmer, Forrest Dowling, described that while the core idea of Infinite had been fixed, Levine was still tinkering on larger story beats and settings, which would have drastic impacts on various teams as those changes filtered through the process, often eliminating months-worth of work in a short time. Levine's management approach also began to wear down on some of the staff (see Impact below), leading to a number of departures in 2012. Among the developers to leave in 2012 was Tynan Sylvester, who went on to create RimWorld.

To help with focusing the team's timelines and budget, Irrational Games hired Jordan Thomas, the creative director of 2K Marin that led BioShock 2's development, in January 2012. Levine and Thomas decided on the roadmap for Infinite, quickly determining that the multiplayer elements were not needed and refocusing on the single-player campaign. 2K later hired Don Roy in March 2012, a former game producer from Sony and Microsoft. Roy found that there was no fully playable build of Infinite, and Irrational had outsourced much of the game's content but failed to have any process to bring that content back into their internal production line. As a result, that content was effectively lost, leading to significant wasted costs and time. Roy stepped in to streamline the production processes and try to bring the game back on track.

Despite improved processes, Irrational continued to shed developers, with several announcing their departures in August 2012; these included art director Nate Wells, who began working with Naughty Dog, and director of product development Tim Gerritsen. Two further high-level departures occurred in October 2012: Don Norbury and Clint Bundrick, who were producers for the game's artificial intelligence and combat design, respectively; Irrational did not comment on these departures but asserted that the game was still scheduled for its February 2013 release. Levine stated that he still believes in the Infinite development team's capacity to complete the game as expected.

At the same time as these departures, 2K hired Rod Fergusson from Epic Games as their product director while Scott Sinclair, art director from the original Bioshock, replaced Wells. Fergusson had gained a reputation as a "closer" from his prior work at Microsoft and Epic, helping to assure games were completed in their final development cycle. Fergusson reviewed the state of Infinite, and in direct consultation with Levine, made several calls to stop work on content either not yet in the game or that was not yet refined enough for shipping. Additional material, such as locations, weapons, vigors, and other enemies, were also cut from the game as it neared publication and fine-tuned the experience; Irrational's Bill Gardner claims that enough material for five or six games were scrapped during this process. Former Irrational employees credited Fergusson with helping to make Levine's creative vision into practice timelines and budgets, helping to make sure that Infinite would be released in a timely manner.

=== Impact ===
About a year after BioShock Infinite's release, Levine announced that he was going to be drastically scaling back the size of Irrational Games down to around 15 total employees, and seek to develop more narrative-driven games. Ultimately, this resulted in Irrational Games being rebranded as Ghost Story Games in February 2017; the new studio was still owned by 2K Games, but was considered a fresh start for Levine and others. Levine had cited stress over the development of BioShock Infinite as the primary reason to reduce the size of Irrational's team; he stated in 2014 that his choice was "to refocus my energy on a smaller team with a flatter structure and a more direct relationship with gamers. In many ways, it will be a return to how we started: a small team making games for the core gaming audience." Levine described these newer games based on the concept of "narrative Lego" bricks.

Former developers from Irrational discussed with Polygon what they felt led to the transition of the studio. According to these employees, work on BioShock Infinite's main gameplay initially focused on the two multiplayer modes, with very little time spent on the single player campaign, initially because neither time nor money were a concern at the start of the project, an allowance from 2K Games due to the success of the first BioShock. However, with some years into the project and no strong game close to being delivered, Levine became more involved in overseeing nearly all elements of the game. While these employees commented favorably that Levine was detail-oriented, they considered that his demand for detail led to many of the game's parts being reworked over and over again. These employees also said that Levine's style created a culture within Irrational that, while rewarding, led to numerous confrontations between employees. As described above, 2K brought in several hires to help in terms of project managing to keep the game on track in 2012, including Thomas, Roy, and Fergusson.

Levine had stated that his approach to video game development is comparable to sculpting a statue or writing a script, where one often will self-edit their own work after completing much of it. Roy stated of Levine, "He essentially makes a tremendous amount of a game so he can evaluate it, which makes sense. But when you're doing it on paper, thats one thing. When you're doing it with real humans, time, money, emotions, obligations, it's a completely different thing." Levine himself said that he had found in his past experience of development that he spent much of the development time toying around with ideas and concepts during which there may be no real game and otherwise procrastinating, but when a deadline was imposed "I find that when it's time to [ask] what do we keep, what do we cut, what do we focus on, what do we polish, that's really when the games made."

Once the game had "gone gold" and was ready for release, there was some departures of employees, which most attributed to the standard ebb and flow during software development. The team started to transition towards developing three planned pieces of downloadable content for the game. Irrational was planning on working on the two episodic content, BioShock Infinite: Burial at Sea, while 2K Marin was to work on "Clash in the Clouds", a more combat-heavy story. Executives at Irrational found that the product 2K Marin was producing was not acceptable, and Irrational took over its development, having only about nine weeks to complete the work before it was scheduled for release. With the studio already down some numbers from the previous departures, in addition to many others taking time off following Infinite's release, this forced the remaining developers to focus heavily on completing the downloadable content. Another wave of employees departed the company around this time. Eventually, all three pieces of content were completed for release, around late 2013, but at that point, the studio had no other projects set up, leading to some concern about the fate of Irrational. These concerns were also fueled by Fergusson's departure in mid-2013; employees were told that Levine was considering what their next game would be given the current environment in the market, and a desire to work with a smaller team. Following the completion of the downloadable content, Irrational had a few rounds of layoffs to scale back the team. Around February 2014, only about 70 full time staff along with five contractors remained, when Levine announced that he would be winding down Irrational, and laid-off most of the remaining staff, before eventually rebranding the studio to Ghost Story Games in 2017.

The BioShock intellectual property remained with 2K, and the publisher had announced in 2019 that a new BioShock game is planned under a new in-house studio, Cloud Chamber.

== Marketing ==
=== Announcements ===
One of the three Saturday Evening Post-inspired covers of the October 2010 issue of Game Informer to highlight BioShock Infinite, in this one showing Elizabeth tending to Songbird, a giant bird-like robotic creature

Prior to its announcement on August 12, 2010, Irrational Games has used the moniker "Project Icarus" to describe their next game, creating a teaser site in late July 2010. Following a teaser site buildup, Irrational revealed the game on August 12, 2010, at a 1920s-themed press event in New York's Plaza Hotel, reflecting Infinite's setting. For its October 2010 issue, Game Informer featured three covers styled as early 20th-century magazines, illustrated by Irrational's Rob Waters and including fictional ads inspired by The Saturday Evening Post. Kevin Gifford of Gamasutra praised these covers. Similarly, in its reveal of the first images of the player protagonist Booker, Electronic Games Monthly used a cover in homage to the Uncanny X-Men comic, Days of Future Past, another story dealing with alternate realities.

In March 2012, an October release date announced. By May, the release was delayed to February the following year, leading to its absence from E3 and Gamescom. By the end of 2012, the launch was delayed further to March 26, 2013, based on new lead Rod Fergusson's recommendation to ensure final quality.

For PlayStation 3, Windows, and Xbox 360, a Special Edition was released with physical collectibles and in-game bonus content, while the Ultimate Songbird Edition added a 9.5" Songbird statue.

=== Release trailers ===
The game's first trailer was released alongside the game's full announcement, showcasing Columbia, the propaganda around the city, and Elizabeth and her powers. A second trailer for the game premiered at the 2011 Spike Video Game Awards held in December of that year; in it, new scenes from the game are played during the song "Will the Circle Be Unbroken?". This version of the song was sung by Elizabeth's voice actress, Courtnee Draper, while the backing guitar is played by Booker's actor, Troy Baker. While Levine had intended to use Draper for the vocals, Baker's role was happenstance; as Levine was working with Draper in the recording of the song, Baker offered up his abilities on the guitar, and the group spent several hours to exact the appropriate tone of the song. A version of this song, sung by both actors, is part of the game's soundtrack. Given the opportunity for a broadcast trailer, Levine wanted to create a mood piece, and centered the trailer around desolation of the workers in the factories of Columbia in the Finkton district, providing the basis for the creation of the Vox Populi. The trailer had received some criticism from religious groups, believing that its producers had purposely removed the word "Lord" from the song, but Levine pointed out that the original hymn, written in 1908, did not include the word; it was added in the Carter Family recording of "Can the Circle Be Unbroken (By and By)" in 1935.

A third trailer was released in October 2012, entitled "Beast of America". It initially shares similarities with the opening of BioShock, with Booker being taken to a lighthouse with instruction. From there, the trailer's first half shows in-game scenes of settings around Columbia representative of American Exceptionalism such as an amusement park, a public beach, and an ice-cream parlor, prior to demonstration many of the gameplay elements including the Skyhook and the Heavy Hitters. The trailer is set to Nico Vega's "Beast", which, as stated by Time's Matt Peckham notes, "excoriates American apathy, in so many words, '[planting] seeds for the Beast of America'". A fourth trailer, "City in the Sky", was released, showcasing many of the game's elements, including Columbia, Booker, Elizabeth, Songbird, and Comstock. The fifth trailer "The Lamb of Columbia", focuses more on Elizabeth, showing her importance to the war aboard Columbia, her potency of her powers, and how Booker comes to fear her.

A separate set of teaser trailers was released started in January 2013, and presented the history of Columbia in the style of shows like In Search Of..., an approach used by the television show Lost to demonstrate the history of the fictional Dharma Initiative. Within the trailers, presented as a film "Truth in Legend: Columbia – A Modern Day Icarus", the fictional host, Alistair Bloom, briefly narrates the mysteries of Columbia, such as its disappearance or the legend of Songbird.

=== Other marketing ===
Russian cosplayer Anna Moleva (right) had recreated the character of Elizabeth (left) so accurately that Irrational hired her to be their live-action Elizabeth, and slightly redid her in-game model to resemble Moleva.

The official game cover was revealed by Irrational Games in early December 2012; the art featured DeWitt against a burning flag with some other elements of the game. Several journalists were critical of the art, with the lack of any major elements from the game including Elizabeth, and lacking any of the uniqueness that BioShock Infinite had set itself to be prior to this point, such as through the Game Informer Saturday Evening Post-inspired covers. Erik Kain of Forbes considered the art "generic", while Owen Good of Kotaku considered it both "bland" and "cliché"; Gieson Cacho of the San Jose Mercury News noted that the cover was reminiscent of Uncharted: Drake's Fortune, down to the pose of DeWitt matching that of Nathan Drake. Levine responded to these complaints commenting that they had decided to make the cover art something to draw the attention of the more casual player, "the uninformed, the person who doesn't read IGN" that may never have heard of the game, knowing that those players that are already planning to purchase the game do not need to be swayed further. A public poll was opened by Irrational to allow players to decide what the reversible cover art should be, while alternate cover art will be provided as downloadable files that players can print and use. Levine further showed the back cover art, which includes Elizabeth, an element further designed to draw interest in casual players. Levine stated that for the cover and other parts of the game's promotion including live-action commercials, they had hired Anna "Ormeli" Moleva, a Russian cosplayer that had earlier attracted attention for her recreation of Elizabeth back in September 2011.

=== Tie-in media ===
Dark Horse Comics released an art book in 2012, entitled The Art of BioShock Infinite. NECA has produced miniatures of Elizabeth and a Boy of Silence, as well as a full-scale replica of a Skyhook. Plaid Hat Games was contracted to publish a board game based on Infinite, entitled BioShock Infinite: The Siege of Columbia, in which players take on the roles of the Founders or Vox Populi to battle each other for control of the city. The game was released in 2013.

A prequel novella called BioShock Infinite: Mind in Revolt was released in February 2013, written by Levine and Joe Fielder as an in-universe report by Dr. Francis Pinchot, after a research study about captured Vox Populi leader Daisy Fitzroy. According to Levine, the novella offers a spoiler-free backstory that gains deeper meaning after completing the game.

Irrational held a "Name in the Game" contest to feature a player's name in the world of Infinite, with the winner, Payton Lane Easter, inspiring the in-game business "Payton Lane Easter & Son."

=== BioShock Infinite: Industrial Revolution ===
In the browser-based Industrial Revolution, players assemble machines from gears and pulleys to perform specific actions.

Pre-orders of the game granted the purchaser with an accesscode to a browser-based puzzle game, BioShock Infinite: Industrial Revolution, developed in conjunction with Lazy 8 Studios. Irrational approached Lazy 8 Studios after seeing their steampunk puzzle game Cogs, asking them to develop a BioShock tie-in with similar gear-based puzzles and steampunk setting. The resulting game simplified Cogs' mechanics into 59 puzzles and incorporated a branching narrative where players aligned with either the Founders or the Vox Populi, with irreversible decisions meant to provoke second-guessing. Solving levels unlocks items within the main BioShock Infinite game.

=== Downloadable content ===
Following the release of BioShock Infinite, two major pieces of downloadable content have been released by Irrational. The first piece, titled Clash in the Clouds, was released on July 30, 2013. It is a non-story arena-based combat mode where the player is faced with increasingly difficult waves of enemies on various maps based on in-game settings. The player earns in-game money that they can use at a central hub to buy new vigors, upgrade weapons and vigors, and unlock character models, concept art, kinetoscopes, and music. Various challenges in the form of blue ribbons are given to the player, such as by killing foes with specific weapon and vigor combinations.

The second piece of downloadable content, titled Burial at Sea, is a story-based expansion set in Rapture that links Infinite's story to that of the original BioShock game. It consists of two episodes: in the first episode, released on November 12, 2013, player assume control of Booker, who is a private investigator in a different reality; in the second episode, released on March 25, 2014, players assume control of Elizabeth. BioShock Infinite Complete Edition, bundling BioShock Infinite with Clash in the Clouds and Burial at Sea, is due for release later in 2014.

Additionally, new weapons, gear, costumes, and vigors are also available as extra content; for example, part of the reward for completing the Industrial Revolution puzzle game included such weapons and gear. A season pass is available to purchase all downloadable content for a reduced price. Columbia was featured as a stage in fighting game PlayStation All-Stars Battle Royale and is seen in the background along with a blimp and a Songbird in another stage. BioShock Infinite outfits for LittleBigPlanet games were released in March 2013.
