= Symphony (video game) =

2012 video game

- Developer: Empty Clip Studios
- Publisher: Empty Clip Studios
- Platforms: Windows, Linux, OS X
- Release: Windows; August 9, 2012; Linux, OS X; May 28, 2014
- Genre: Shoot-em-up
- Mode: Single-player

Symphony is a shoot-em-up video game developed and published by Empty Clip Studios. It was released for Microsoft Windows in August 2012, and for Linux and Mac OS X in May 2014.

The game received positive reviews from critics, and a sequel named Mind Symphony was released in 2019 for iOS, macOS and tvOS through Apple Arcade.

== Gameplay ==
In Symphony, players maneuver their ship (orange, bottom right) and shoot down attacking enemies (blue and red) as to defend their music at the top of the screen.

Upon first launch of Symphony, the user is given the opportunity to add existing music on their computer to the songs that ship with the game; by default this includes common locations such as the directory for iTunes and Windows Media Player. Additional folders can be added at a later time, and existing folders rescanned for new songs.

The player is then given the option to select a song using a set of simple filters, or to have the game randomly select a song. The game will process the song to create the patterns of attack that the player will face. Prior to starting the actual game, the player can customize their ship in the game with any equipment earned and purchased from completing songs.

The core game is otherwise like most arcade shoot-em-ups like Galaga, where the player must maneuver their ship across the bottom of the screen to evade enemy ships and fire, while firing on the enemies to destroy them and "protect" their music. Points are scored for defeating enemies and the player can earn a scoring multiplier by keeping a chain of destruction going. If the ship is hit, parts of it will fall off, but the player can collect notes left behind by destroyed ships to restore the ship. Should the ship take too much damage, the ship will respawn after a few moments, but the player's score will be penalized. The player is also penalized for allowing certain ships from remaining on screen for too long, affecting their music. Certain target scores are pre-determined for each song, with the player's goal to surpass these levels. When the song is completed, they then gain in-game currency and the opportunity to buy a new weapon for their ship.

Certain songs from the player's library will randomly be selected as boss levels, where the regular attacking ships are replaced by a single, difficult-to-kill enemy. There are a total of six bosses, reflecting the six difficulty levels in the game. Defeating three bosses at one difficulty level will allow the player to access the next highest difficulty level, and the kinds of rewards that the player can earn for completing songs. Once at the sixth level, defeating the sixth boss will effectively win the game for the player.

Players can opt to have their scores tracked on external servers based on the song name and artist. This creates global leaderboards so the player can compare their abilities with friends and other players.

== Development ==
Symphony is the product of the two-man development team of Empty Clip Studios, Francois Bertand and Matt Shores. The game has been in development since 2008, and had an initial planned 2010 release, but subsequent development pushed the game back into 2012. One of the goals of their game was to develop their music analysis engine as to "capture [the] range of emotions that's uniquely present in every song".

Symphony was awarded two prizes at the 2012 Indie Game Challenge; "Technical Achievement" (which included a $2,500 prize) and "GameStop PC Digital Download Award". On May 27, 2014, Symphony was included in a Humble Bundle in which the Linux and Mac OS X versions debuted.

== Reception ==
Reception

Aggregate score
Aggregator	Score
Metacritic	75/100

Review scores
Publication	Score
GameSpot	8/10
IGN	7/10
Hardcore Gamer	4/5
USA Today	3/4

Symphony received generally positive feedback from journalists who compared it positively to Beat Hazard and Audiosurf, two other games that procedurally generate gameplay based on the player's choice of music track. Marc Saltzman of USA Today called the title "fun and frantic" but commented that it becomes repetitive. Leif Johnson of GameSpot considered the weapon upgrade system to be a differentiation from these other games, as the randomness of such upgrades keeps the game interesting, though manipulating the upgrades can be difficult for large music libraries.

A common initial complaint of the game was an input lag that slowed down the player's movements and affected their performance. The Empty Clip team was able to address this lag issue and others within the first week of its release.
