= Brandon Q. Morris =

German fiction writer (born 1966)

Brandon Q. Morris, pseudonym of Matthias Matting, born 28 August 1966 in Luckenwalde (East Germany), is a German writer of hard science-fiction.

== Biography ==
After completing his physics studies at the TU Dresden, Matting became an editor at a specialist publisher for computer magazines in Munich. In the following years he worked among other things. as editor for Computer Bild, Wirtschaftswoche, Focus and Heise-Verlag. In addition, he regularly published specialist books on various technical topics as well as several fiction novels. Matting also operated web portals for self-publishers and offered seminars for authors. From February 2015 to December 2017 he was chairman of the board of the German Self Publisher Association, which he co-founded. Under the pseudonym, he has also been a science fiction writer since 2017.

== Book features ==
All of Morris' books have an afterword educational chapter about the subject matter (such as a celestial object like Enceladus or concept like black holes) that drives the plot of the book.

== Awards ==
- In 2011 Matthias Matting was one of the first winners of the derneuebuchpreis.de (dnbp), endowed with a total of 20,000 euros, in the non-fiction category for Travel to Fukushima.
- Skoutz Award 2019 in the Science Fiction category together with Cliff Allister for the novel Helium-3.
- Fantastik-Literaturpreis Seraph 2020 - nomination longlist “Best Independent Title” for the novel Das Triton-Desaster.

== Publications ==
- Ice Moon series
  - Enceladus Mission (2017)
  - Titan Probe (2018)
  - Io Encounter (2018)
  - Return to Enceladus (2018)
  - Jupiter Catastrophe (2018)
- Solar System series
  - Hole (2018)
  - Silent Sun (2018)
  - Rift (2019)
  - Triton Disaster (2020)
  - Clouds of Venus (2020)
  - Dark Spring (2020)
  - The Beacon (2021)
  - Pluto Debacle (2023)
  - The Uranus Fiasco (2023)
- Disturbance series
  - The Disturbance (2022)
  - The Disturbance 2: The Answer (2022)
  - The Disturbance 3: The Truth (2023)
- Proxima Trilogy
  - Proxima Rising (2019)
  - Proxima Dying (2019)
  - Proxima Dreaming (2019)
- Proxima Logfiles
  - Marchenko's Children (2021)
  - Into the Darkness (2021)
  - Into the Light (2021)
  - Runaway (2021)
  - Evolution (2021)
  - Olom (2022)
  - Earthward (2022)
- Big Rip Trilogy
  - The Death of the Universe (2020)
  - Ghost Kingdom (2020)
  - Rebirth (2020)
- Amphirite series
  - Amphirite 1: The Black Planet (2020)
  - Amphirite 2 (2021)
  - Amphirite 3 (2021)
- Andromeda series
  - Andromeda: The Encounter (2022)
  - Andromeda: The Sojourn (2022)
  - Andromeda: The Arrival (2022)
- The Timeless Artifact series
  - Möbius – The Timeless Artifact (2022)
  - Möbius 2 – The Timeless Artifact (2022)
  - Möbius 3 – The Timeless Artifact (2022)
- Mars Nation series
  - Mars Nation Part 1 (2019)
  - Mars Nation Part 2 (2019)
  - Mars Nation Part 3 (2019)
- Helium 3 series, co-written by Cliff Allister
  - Helium-3: Fight for the Future (2021)
  - Helium-3: Death from the Past (2021)
- Impact series
  - Impact: Titan (2020)
  - Impact: Earth (2020)
- Standalone novels
  - The Wall: Eternal Day (2021) (a companion book, The Wall: Eternal Night (2021) is written by Joshua Calvert)
  - Lost Moon: Lunar Eclipse (2022) (a companion book, Lost Moon: Earth Storms (2022) is written by Tim L. Rey)
