= Extrasolar =

2014 video game

- Developer: Lazy 8 Studios
- Platform: Browser
- Release: 18 February 2014
- Genres: Adventure, Simulation
- Mode: Single-player

Extrasolar was a 2014 video game developed by Lazy 8 Studios. Described as a single-player browser game with alternate reality elements, players interacted with a browser interface and map on the game's website to receive updates on a Mars rover exploring the surface of a fictional planet, Epsilon Prime. Gameplay consisted of issuing commands to the rover to points of interest on the planet, with travel and updates from the rover taking several real-time hours to complete. Following release, Extrasolar received positive review coverage, with praise directed to its attention to detail and realism and the merit of its passive gameplay model. It received several accolades, including as a nominee for the Nuovo Award at the Independent Games Festival. Due to rising costs and the failure of a Kickstarter campaign to fund future content, the developers of Extrasolar discontinued the game on 1 December 2018.

== Gameplay ==
The user interface of Extrasolar was designed to resemble a browser, allowing the player to receive fictional in-game emails and voice messages.

Players assumed the role of a volunteer remotely operating a Mars rover operated by the Exoplanetary Research Institute (XRI), a fictional organisation who have crowdsourced operation of the mission to players. The rover is located on Artocos, an island on Epsilon Prime, a fictional planet orbiting the star Epsilon Eridani. The objective of Extrasolar was to complete missions to direct the rover to certain locations on the planet, such as to take samples. Mission objectives and updates to the game were shared to the player in the form of emails, recorded video calls and documents shared to a fictional in-game inbox. As the game progresses, these communications reveal a deeper narrative between XRI scientists and a hacker named kryptex81, who warns the player not to trust the organisation.

To issue commands to the rover, players would navigate menus to plot points on a map of the planet for the rover to explore. Players would select a position, time of day, and camera angle for the rover. Once the rover reached its designated location, players would receive a photograph reflecting the perspective of the rover at that location. Players could select up to three points of interest to identify from the resulting photo, which would add entries to a database on the ecosystem of Epsilon Prime. The map also tracked the journey of the rover and points where photos were taken for future reference. The game featured a day and night cycle, requiring the player to use flash or infrared to see objects if shots were taken in the darkness.

Extrasolar operated on a free-to-play model. Described as taking time for player input to "relay through space", the rover would have a limited range and speed to travel to locations and take four hours to receive a screenshot. Players could pay a one-time membership fee to reduce the maximum time restrictions to one hour, and unlimited use of photography features. Players could also pay a larger fee to continue playing the game following completion of all the missions. Photographs generated by the rover could also be shared by players on social media, including Facebook and Twitter.

== Development ==
Extrasolar was developed by Lazy 8 Studios, led by producer Rob Jagnow, a doctor in computer graphics from the Massachusetts Institute of Technology, lead artist Brendan Mauro and software designer Jon Le Plastrier. The studio had previously created Cogs, which was featured as part of an alternative reality game led by Valve Corporation named Potato Sack to promote the release of Portal 2. The participation encouraged the studio to explore methods to "blur the line between fantasy and reality", although chose to focus on a single-player experience with a linear narrative to be accessible for players.

Development of the game commenced in April 2010, with Jagnow conceiving of an online space exploration game as a method of showcasing high-quality rendering techniques to a general audience. The concept of interacting with a distant Mars rover following a delay supported the game's anticipated limitations of providing players with one high-resolution photo every hour. Most of Extrasolar was programmed using the Python programming language, with some elements of the client and its user interface written in JavaScript, and the renderer using C++. Third-party tools including GeoControl were used to generate the terrain. In order to create a plausible scientific premise, the development team engaged scientific consultants, including a biologist, Jane van Susteren. The landscape on Epsilon Prime was inspired by Jagnow's experiences travelling with his father, a geologist, and Socotra, an island off the coast of East Africa. The game was promoted via a website prior to release, providing background to the Exoplanetary Research Institute.

Extrasolar launched on 18 February 2014, with the developers entering preproduction for a second and third season of content. It was showcased at PAX East in April 2014. The game was not commercially successful, with developers stating that whilst "quite a few" players paid a fee to upgrade their accounts, revenue was "nowhere near enough to fund development of new content" and was "barely enough to keep [the game] up and running". In September 2014, a Kickstarter campaign was launched with an $85,000 target to support development of new seasons of content for Extrasolar, proposing new features including topographic maps. The campaign was unsuccessful. In November 2018, in response to the rising costs of operating the game's website, the developers announced Extrasolar would shut down on 1 December of that year.

== Reception ==
Extrasolar has been described by critics as a browser game and an alternate reality game, although several remarked that the game did not feature the conventional alternate reality mechanics such as communication outside the game. Several critics praised the game's immersive qualities and imitation of scientific procedures. Holly Green of The A.V. Club stated the presentation of its fictional ecosystems were "educational but interesting", and Andrew Webster of The Verge writing that exploration was "truly fascinating" due to the detailed information about the planet, and how the game "really draws you into its world". Listing the game as one of the best of 2014, Darren Nakamura of Destructoid praised the game as feeling "more real than almost anything out there", writing that its "attention to scientific detail" and its alternative reality elements helped "facilitate the suspension of disbelief".

Critics were generally positive about the passive gameplay and delays, and the game was seen as ideal to play in short bursts of time. Kelsey Adams of CNET wrote that whilst the delays "sound frustrating", she found they "contributed to the illusion of controlling a rover far away in space". Both Dan Whitehead of Eurogamer and Chris Priestman of Kill Screen considered the countdown mechanic built the player's anticipation, with Whitehead stating the mechanic was "entirely justified by the narrative, rather than a crude interruption". Describing the game's concept as "initially smart and appealing", Alec Meer of Rock Paper Shotgun critiqued its execution, writing that the game involved too many delays between events, and featured a "disassociation between the apparent gravity of the situation and the limitations of my screenshot-scrutinising actions".

=== Accolades ===
In 2014, Extrasolar received a nomination for the Nuovo Award at the Independent Games Festival, and won the Best Desktop Game at the US Indie Prize Awards. It was also shortlisted for the Gamer's Voice award at the SXSW Gaming Awards. The following year, it received an Honorable Mention for the Innovation Award at the 2015 Game Developers Choice Awards. Extrasolar was also included as a finalist as part of the 2013 IndieCade festival.
