= Sjoerd De Jong =

European video game developer

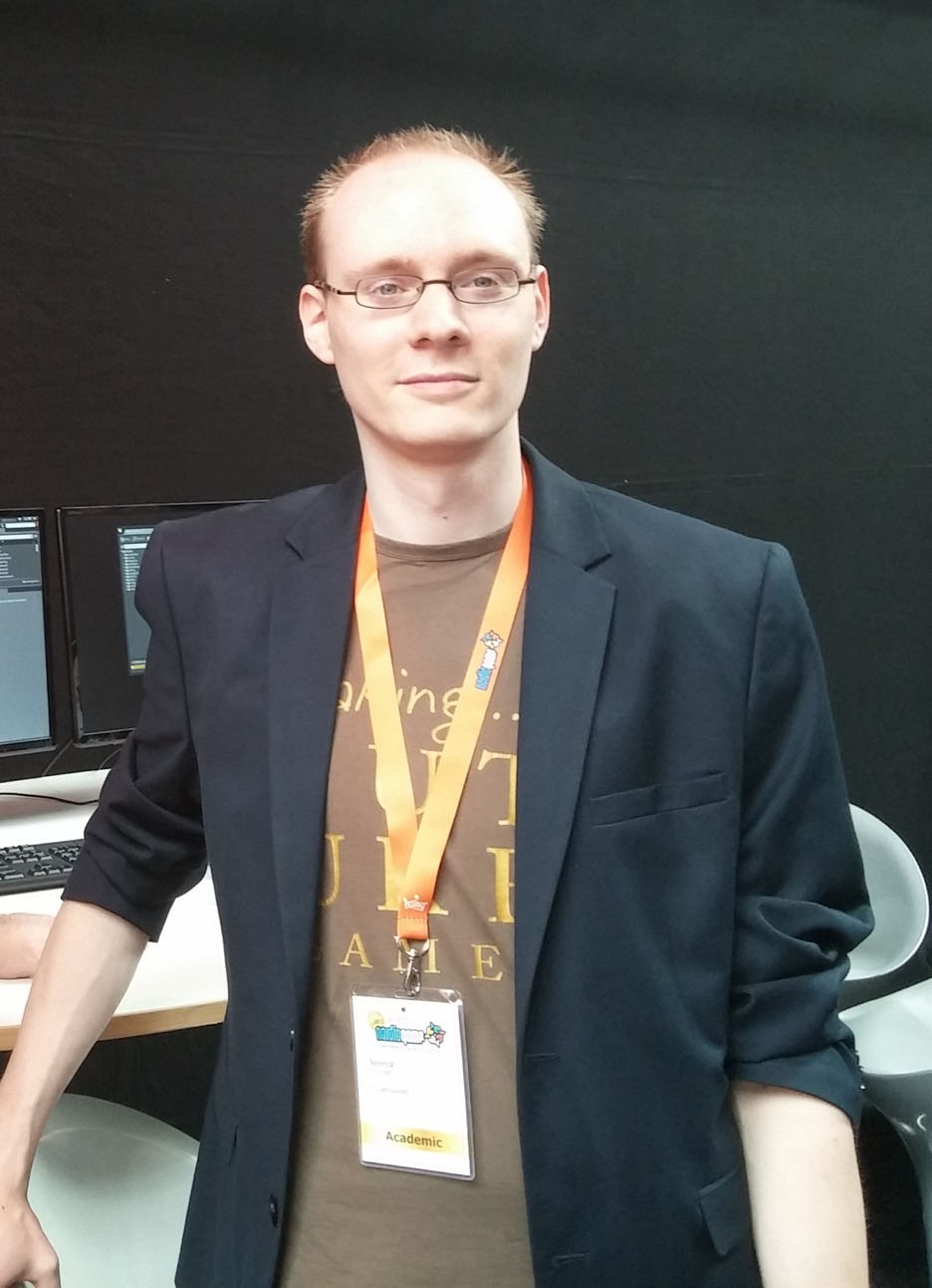
- De Jong at the 2014 Nordic Game Conference in Malmö, Sweden
- Other names: Hourences
- Occupation: Video game developer
- Years active: 1999–present

Sjoerd De Jong, also known as Hourences, is a Dutch-Belgian video game developer, level designer and the founder of Teotl Studios. He serves as technology evangelist for Epic Games, promoting Unreal Engine 4 in the northern half of Europe.

== Career ==
De Jong started making levels for video games at the age of 15, when he purchased a copy of Unreal in 1999. Shortly after, he started to make a name for himself in the Unreal community, not only for the many maps he released, but also for his work on popular Unreal Tournament mods such as "Operation Na Pali", "Xidia" and "Jailbreak". With a few more custom maps and contributions to mods for Unreal Tournament 2003, he was contracted by Epic Games to create 6 maps for Unreal Tournament 2004, two of which were included in the demo. He has worked on several games, including Killzone, The Chronicles of Spellborn and Huxley.

In March 2010, following his work on Syndicate, he founded Teotl Studios. The studio's first project was the first-person action-adventure game The Ball, which was originally a mod for Unreal Tournament 3. His most recent work, The Solus Project, came out in 2016.

== Video game credits ==
- 2004 – Unreal Tournament 2004, Epic Games (level designer / artist)
- 2004 – Street Racing Syndicate, Eutechnyx (3D artist)
- 2004 – Shellshock: Nam '67, Guerrilla Games (environment artist)
- 2004 – Killzone, Guerrilla Games (Environment artist)
- 2006 – Warpath, Digital Extremes (level designer / artist)
- 2008 – The Chronicles of Spellborn, Spellborn International (senior level artist)
- 2010 – Huxley, Webzen Games (level designer / artist)
- 2010 – The Ball, Teotl Studios (creative director / project lead)
- 2011 – Q.U.B.E., Toxic Games (lighting / material artist)
- 2012 – Syndicate, Starbreeze Studios (senior level designer / artist)
- 2012 – Unmechanical, Talawa Games (creative director / project lead)
- 2014 – Rekoil, Plastic Piranha (level artist)
- 2016 – The Solus Project, Teotl Studios (creative director / project lead)

== Books ==
- The Hows and Whys of the Games Industry (2007). Self-published
- The Hows and Whys of Level Design (2008). Self-published
