= The Object =

2024 sci-fi novel by Joshua Calvert

- Cover page of The Object
- Author: Joshua T. Calvert
- Language: English
- Genre: Hard science fiction
- Publisher: Independently published
- Publication date: February 1, 2024
- Publication place: United States
- Pages: 392 (paperback), 380 (e-book)
- ISBN: 979-8-8781-7592-0

The Object is a 2024 hard first contact science fiction novel written by Joshua T. Calvert. It is about a scientist who discovers an extrasolar object which has entered the Solar System under mysterious circumstances.

== Plot ==
Dr. Melody "Mel" Adams is a scientist working at a NASA base in Hawaii. In January 2023, she discovers a strange object near Pluto, which is initially thought to be a comet due to a glow around the object and an elongation assumed to be the tail of the comet. However, Mel realizes that the object which she calls the "visitor" might be an extrasolar spaceship. She proposes this theory in a book titled Extraterrestrial, which becomes a best-seller. However, she is expelled from NASA due to her ideas.

Two years later, amidst a talk show, members of the Secret Service come to take Mel. She meets Jim Rothman, the Administrator of NASA, whom she secretly loves. He confirms that her hypothesis was correct, and NASA is planning to set up a combined mission with the ESA at Houston to research the object, which is named "Serenity". They receive the support of President Brosnahan. Mel is recruited back into NASA, but cannot become an astronaut, because years before, in the astronaut examination, another candidate named Bernard had cheated, stealing her spot. Serenity momentarily disappears behind Saturn's icy rings, but soon appears again.

Soon, a crewed mission to Serenity is planned, and a team of six astronauts including Bernard, Dr. Selena Rogerton, Gabriella Mancarella and Dr. Thomas "Tom" Ehrmann. Due to political reasons, the Chinese also decide to collaborate, and so two of the astronauts are replaced by Chinese taikonauts, Col. Ye Zhigang and Col. Wang Hongbo. Bernard is injured and is replaced by Melody, who is also the commander of the mission.

A spaceship called Pangaea or Pangu Dalu in Mandarin, is built, and is launched in 2031. It is designed to land on Serenity which is fast approaching Mars. During an EVA, Gabriella is killed by micrometeorites. Aboard the ship, Mel, Tom, Selena and Hongbo experience the same dream of floating in deep space. Pangaea lands on the rotating Serenity, and the astronauts begin studying its nature. Tom reveals that is covered by diatoms and polyps and appears to be bionic.

A hole is created on the surface. Mel, Tom, Selena and Hongbo enter the hole, while Zhigang stays aboard Pangaea. The astronauts are attacked by a black fluid and discover that the hole has been sealed by a callus. Selena dies due to impact after falling, and is covered by green snail-like pustules.

The astronauts explore the network of tunnels and realize that the black fluid flows with a periodic tremor and air-flow every 11 minutes 8 seconds. Mel slips and enters a large chamber containing a tree-like neural structure with slow blue-colored flashes of light. Hongbo reaches there too, but after cutting some flesh, is thrown into the network and dies. Her suit is damaged by the green snails which enter inside and cover her corpse.

Mel escapes from the chamber. She meets Tom and they fire a rope to the callus using a potato cannon. When the rope begins shaking, Tom boosts it up again, while the gas throws Melody into Serenity. They realize that Serenity is an organism with a brain, blood vessels, immune cells, etc., but a slow metabolism to facilitate interstellar travel. The dreams might serve as a form of communication from Serenity's side.

Mel enters the brain chamber and sees that Hongbo's suit and MMU have disappeared. She makes actions indicating greetings, and Hongbo's corpse appears to mimic those, while blue flashes flow through the network below her. Mel's mind is transmitted inside a virtual chamber in Serenity's brain, after the green "slugs" enter her body. She meets Serenity, who has assumed Hongbo's form to communicate with her. Serenity reveals that it is a living fully-conscious biological probe, developed by an intelligent species in the distant past to collect data about other intelligent species. This data is sent to a "Data Center" where the species shifted after a gamma ray burst destroyed their home. Serenity had traveled for eons, and had encountered many species, but due to the damage caused by humans, it had only fifty years to live. It reveals that for it, time appears to pass very quickly. Mel is given temporary control of her body, and she uses her spacesuit equipment to contact Zhigang and Tom, who are on the way back to Earth on Pangaea. They continue to monitor her audio and visual system. Mel returns to the virtual chamber and contacts Serenity in Hongbo's form, to ask it about the dreams. Serenity reveals that the dreams were a form of quantum entanglement communication system.

In the epilogue, it is revealed that Tom has lived to the age of 140 years. Fujao is the Secretary-General of the United Nations and has set up many "dream centers" based on knowledge received from Mel's audio and video system. He has set up a mission Pangaea II in honor of the astronauts who are regarded as heroes. The mission is launched from the Wang Hongbo Center in Texas. Finally, Tom dies peacefully, ending the story.

=== Main characters ===
- Lt. Col. Dr. Melody "Mel" Adams - An American scientist and astronaut working at NASA, who discovers Serenity; Commander of Pangaea
- Dr. Thomas "Tom" Ehrmann - A neurologist and chemist from Germany
- Col. Wang Hongbo - A taikonaut from China
- Col. Ye Zhigang - Chinese taikonaut and colleague of Hongbo
- Dr. Selena Rogerton - An American astronaut and physician
- Bernard - A trained American astronaut
- Administrator Jim Rothman - Administrator of NASA
- Serenity - A biological alien probe, which enters the Solar System
