= Lazy 8 Studios =

American video game developer

- Type: Private
- Industry: Video games
- Founded: 2008
- Founder: Rob Jagnow
- Defunct: February 2021
- Headquarters: San Francisco, United States
- Products: Cogs; BioShock Infinite: Industrial Revolution; Extrasolar
- Services: Video game development

Lazy 8 Studios is an independent video game developer. It was founded by Rob Jagnow in 2008 and is based in San Francisco. Jagnow founded the company after spending some time in video game development on flight simulators. Jagnow soon brought aboard Brendan Mauro for art development and Luke Gilbert for sound and music.

== History ==
The company's first title was the 2009 Cogs, a steampunk-like puzzle game that Jagnow had envisioned for many years. The game was successful, nominated for several indie gaming awards and winning the 2010 "Professional" prize at the Indie Game Challenge.

With the game's success, the team was invited by Valve to participate in the Potato Sack, an alternate reality game (ARG) that preceded the release of Valve's Portal 2. The challenge was to modify Cogs to meet the spirit of the game.

Following Cogs, the company began work on a social game called Extrasolar, spurred by their participation in the Potato Sack ARG. Extrasolar plans to have players working with others to solve puzzles in an ARG-like environment, but without the real-time limitations required by most ARGs.

Lazy 8 Studios was invited by Irrational Games to develop a browser-based tie-in puzzle game for their pending release of BioShock Infinite. It is titled BioShock Infinite: Industrial Revolution. Irrational had seen the studio's work on Cogs and felt the steampunk environment was a good match with the nature of their own game.
