= Altitude (video game) =

2009 video game

- Developers: Erik Measure, Karl Sabo
- Publisher: Nimbly Games
- Engine: Java
- Platforms: Windows, Mac OS X, Linux
- Release: May 1, 2009
- Genre: Action
- Modes: Single-player, Multiplayer

Altitude is a multiplayer 2D aerial combat video game developed by American independent software developers Erik Measure and Karl Sabo. The game was released on May 1, 2009 for Windows, Mac OS X and Linux. It became available on Steam on December 4, 2009. It has become a free game in 2014, from the previous 9.99 price.

== Gameplay ==
Players control one of five customizable aircraft and battle in teams across 2D landscapes. As a player gains experience in battle they unlock new planes and customizations called perks. The game has been described by the press as a cross between Teeworlds, Team Fortress 2 and a role-playing video game.

Altitude is primarily an online game with some offline skirmish options and bot support. There are several modes, and plane customizations.

== Game modes ==
=== Free For All (ffa) ===
The players compete in a timed deathmatch, competing for the highest number of kills.

=== Team Deathmatch (tdm) ===
The players are divided into two teams, competing for the highest kill total in a specified amount of time.

=== Team Base Destruction (tbd) ===
In Team Base Destruction or TBD, players try to use a special bomb to destroy the enemy's base while protecting their own bases from the bomb. Planes must pick up the bomb and "bomb run" it into enemy territory with or without escorts to score a hit on the enemy's base. The bomb runners are always at a disadvantage due to the fact that a plane carrying a bomb is slowed down which makes it more vulnerable to enemies. bombs spawn at either base and can only be used by that team and will be simply disarmed instead of picked up or spawn in the middle of the map where any team can use it. if the bomb hits something else other than a base it will most likely instakill it due to the fact that the bomb does extremely large amounts of damage.

=== Ball ===
Ball mode utilizes a single persistent ball and a goal for each team. Every time a goal is scored all planes are reset and the ball is given to the team that just conceded the goal. At the beginning of the match the ball is placed in the middle of the map. The winning team is the team that reaches 6 goals first, or once a timer expires. A plane that carries the ball is slowed down, much like in Team base destruction.

=== One life deathmatch (1dm) ===
This game mode is similar to normal deathmatch, with the exception that players will not respawn until the round is completed. Its objective is to be the last plane left alive. There is also a round time limit.

=== One life demolition (1de) ===
The one life demolition game type sets up the teams in an attack/defense scenario, where one team has to plant a bomb on the defender team's base, and the defenders have to stop them. The teams switch places after a number of rounds, swapping the attackers and defenders.

=== One life team base destruction (1bd) ===
The one life tbd mode is similar to the normal tbd type, but with one life per round. The one life game types are all round based.

== Reception ==
- Altitude received favorable reviews and has attained an overall score of 79 out of 100, based on 6 reviews, on aggregate website Metacritic.
- PC Zone magazine in the UK commented that it is "a great little indie game, it's cheap and you really should play it."
- IT Reviews called it "the perfect lunch break filler, with its fast paced action and quick turnaround matches."
- Finalist at the 2010 Penny Arcade Expo
- Winner of Technical Achievement and Gamer's Choice Awards at the 2010 Indie Game Challenge
