= Potato Sack =

Alternate reality game

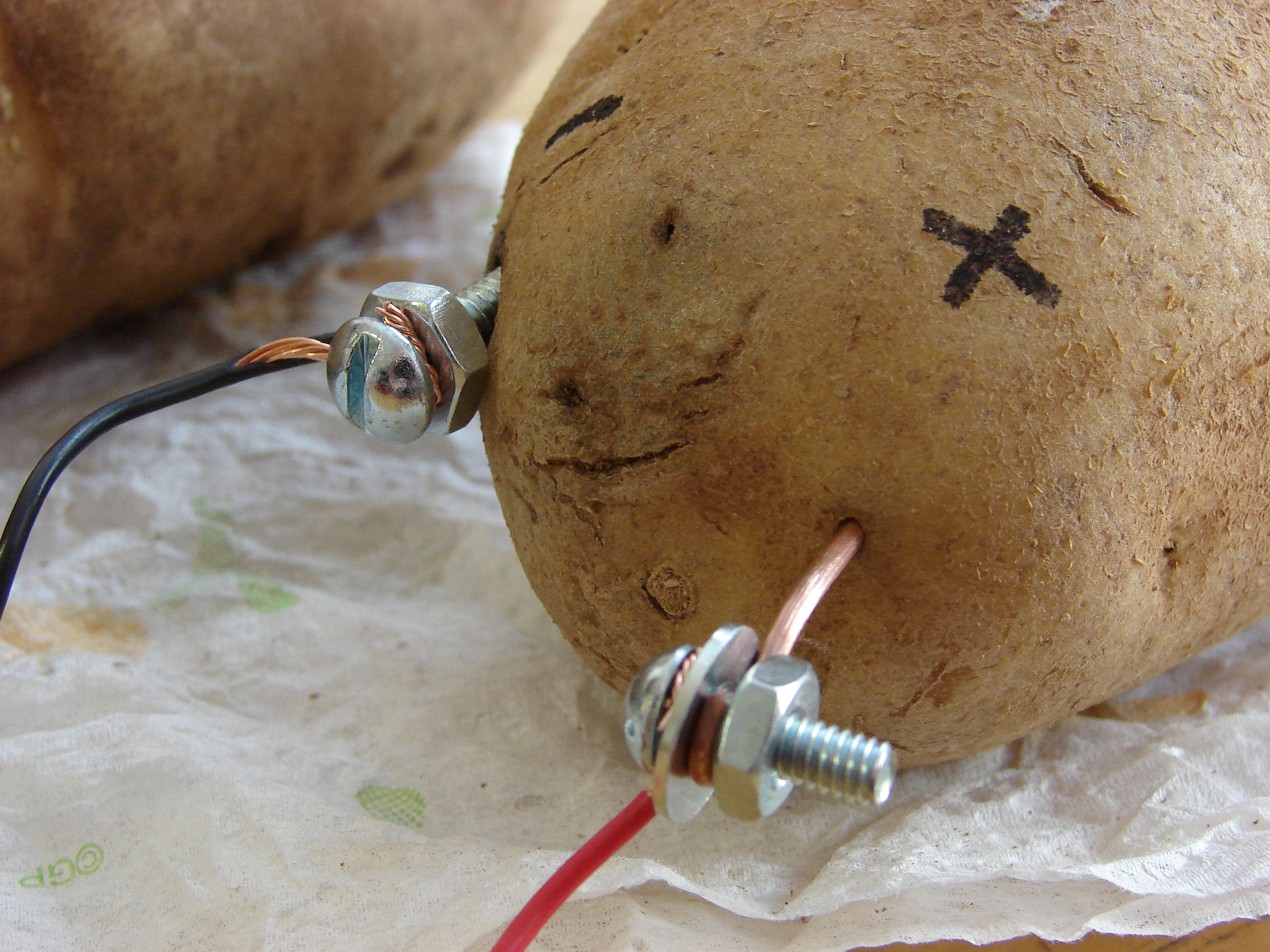
The ARG's theme of potatoes reflected a part of Portal 2's story, in which GLaDOS is powered by a potato battery.

Potato Sack is an alternate reality game (ARG) created by Valve and the developers of thirteen independent video games to promote the release of Valve's game Portal 2, in April 2011. Valve president Gabe Newell envisioned the game as a "Cross Game Design Event" in December 2010, and allowed the developers free rein to design the game using Valve's Portal intellectual property. The game, requiring players to find and solve a number of puzzles hidden within updates of the thirteen games, led to the opportunity for players to release Portal 2 about 10 hours earlier than its planned release by playing games under the pretense of powering up GLaDOS, the sentient computer from the Portal series. The ARG's theme of potatoes is based on plot elements within Portal 2, specifically that for part of the game, GLaDOS's personality module is run off a potato battery.

Large numbers of people participated in solving the puzzles. Reaction from players and journalists was mixed; while some felt the ARG had limited benefit, some saw the ARG as a show of commitment from Valve to independent game development.

== History ==
=== The Potato Sack Bundle ===
The ARG began without announcement with the release of the "Potato Sack Bundle" on Steam on April 1, 2011, which offered the included games at 75% off their normal price. The games included in the Potato Sack are listed below with their developer and release year.

Game	Developer	Release year
1... 2... 3... KICK IT! (Drop That Beat Like an Ugly Baby)	Dejobaan Games	2011
AaaaaAAaaaAAAaaAAAAaAAAAA!!! – A Reckless Disregard for Gravity	Dejobaan Games	2009
Amnesia: The Dark Descent	Frictional Games	2010
Audiosurf	Invisible Handlebar	2008
The Ball	Teotl Studios / Tripwire Interactive	2010
Bit.Trip Beat	Gaijin Games	2009
Cogs	Lazy 8 Studios	2009
Defense Grid	Hidden Path Entertainment	2008
Killing Floor	Tripwire Interactive	2009
RUSH	Two Tribes	2010
Super Meat Boy	Team Meat	2010
Toki Tori	Two Tribes	2010
The Wonderful End of the World	Dejobaan Games	2009

=== The first update ===
In the first phase, players found nonsense phrases that contained 16 consonants, leading to a 4x4 grid and ultimately to a bitmap image of a letter, later combined with other letters to get a complete password.

On the release date of the Potato Sack bundle, players found the games within it had recently received updates. Most provided an immediate cosmetic change by replacing or adding assets that referred to potatoes. When players started looking deeper into these new assets, they discovered a series of glyphs that referred to other games associated with specific letters, as well as nonsense sentences that lead to specific cyphers. Other hints were less direct, using online services such as Twitter and YouTube to embed clues. In the case of Toki Tori, sections of new levels included braille code that referred to the latitude and longitude coordinates of Two Tribes' headquarters. One player, "Jake_R", traveled to Two Tribes, where he discovered the glyphs and cyphers posted outside their headquarters. Several of Two Tribes' developers, upon learning of his presence, began filming him from a barbershop across the street. They would later use this footage of him climbing a pole to find these clues as part of another clue during the second phase.

=== The second update ===
On April 7, each of the games in the Potato Sack received a second major update. Players found that by completing certain tasks in the game, they would be presented with login screens for the fictional Aperture Science corporation within the Steam interface. Other tasks and clues led to passwords that could be used to log into these Aperture Science screens. These provided players with compressed archives of pictures that consisted of Portal 2 artwork, including photographs from around Seattle (where Valve is based) embedded in their alpha channels. Each archive included a portion of a larger archive that was password-protected; the password was unveiled using the glyphs, cyphers, and letters from the first update. The larger archive gave further photographs of the Seattle area. When the locations of these points were mapped and connected per the puzzle's instructions, the map showed the word "prelude". Furthermore, players that reached and logged into these screens received a potato icon for each accessed screen on their Steam profile.

=== The third update ===
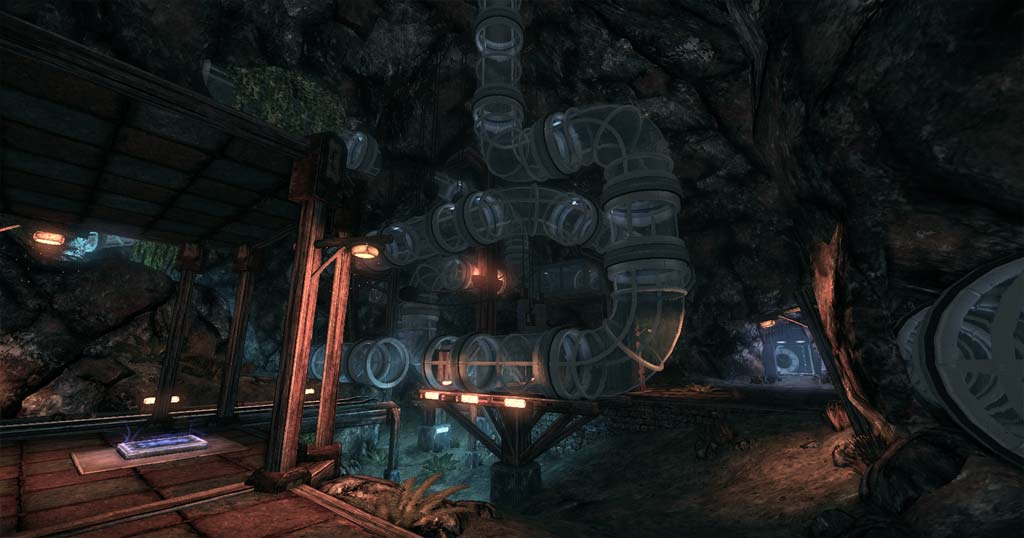
For the third update, Teotl Studios integrated their own Mayan-inspired level design with Portal-themed aspects to create additional content for The Ball.

On April 12, another update for each game was released. These updates were all Portal themed, such as levels based on Aperture Science in The Ball and Killing Floor. Again, players found that by completing specific tasks in the new content, they would be presented with an Aperture Science screen, though this time the screens provided a cryptic audio clue. These clues were found to be two-part clues relating to the previously identified locations around Seattle. By mapping these points, using locations commonly shared by one clue, players were led to the name of a Steam group that contained a single member by the name of "dinosaur", a reference to an earlier ARG used for Portal 2's announcement. Screenshots within this user's profile gave a QR Code that pointed to a website with a countdown time set to expire on the morning of April 15, 2011. Players who discovered these audio clues would be awarded another potato on their Steam profile. A total of 36 possible potatoes were found: 35 within the games and the referenced Steam group, and a 36th earned by obtaining all 35 of the other potatoes.

Concurrent with these changes, Portal 2 became available for pre-loading on the Steam client. At this point, several journalists and players suspected that Portal 2 may have been unlocked early at the end of the countdown timer. This correlated with a separate puzzle embedded in messages sent by Newell to a number of gaming sites; the message suggested the "early release" of material and "thirteen offsite chambers", seemingly referring to the independent games, as well as a message "4/19/2011 7 AM == 4/15/2011 9 AM", again referencing the planned Portal 2 release date and the countdown timer. As April 15 drew near, about nine heavily involved players from the ARG appeared to disengage from the various chat rooms, leaving with the message "There's a hole in the sky through which I can fly"—a line used in early advertisements for Portal; when contacted by other players, these individuals remained coy and cryptic about their actions, appearing to have been "infected" by GLaDOS. It was later revealed that these players, contacted by Valve a few days prior, were invited to Valve's headquarters to be the first to play Portal 2.

=== GLaDOS@Home ===
At the end of the countdown timer, the countdown website redirected to a new page on the fictional Aperture Science website, calling itself "GLaDOS@Home". Spoofing other distributed computing efforts like Folding@home, the site stated that if players generated enough CPU cycles by playing the thirteen games in the Potato Sack, GLaDOS would be rebooted earlier, effectively suggesting an earlier release of Portal 2 before the originally scheduled time of 7:00 AM PDT on April 19, 2011. The number of potatoes found would also serve to help to "boost" the effort. Only one game, Killing Floor, saw an update in this phase, where a special chamber in their Portal-themed map would be opened for players to complete for an in-game achievement. The players organized a schedule of games to be played to maximize the rate of progression, and eventually, ended up unlocking Portal 2 on Steam about ten hours before this scheduled time. The approximately 1800 players that had successfully earned all 36 potatoes by the time of Portal 2's launch were given the Valve complete pack, including Portal 2, which they could gift to other players. Players who had found at least thirteen potatoes or played each of the Potato Sack games for a minimum amount of time received Portal 2-themed items within Team Fortress 2.

=== Reunion ===
On June 12, 2012, the Potato Sack bundle briefly returned to Steam under the name "Potato Sack Reunion".

== Development ==
Valve had previously performed an ARG in the week prior to the announcement of Portal 2, at the start of March 2010. The ARG was initiated by a new patch to Portal that led to a sequence of puzzles, which were ultimately solved within hours of the patch's release.

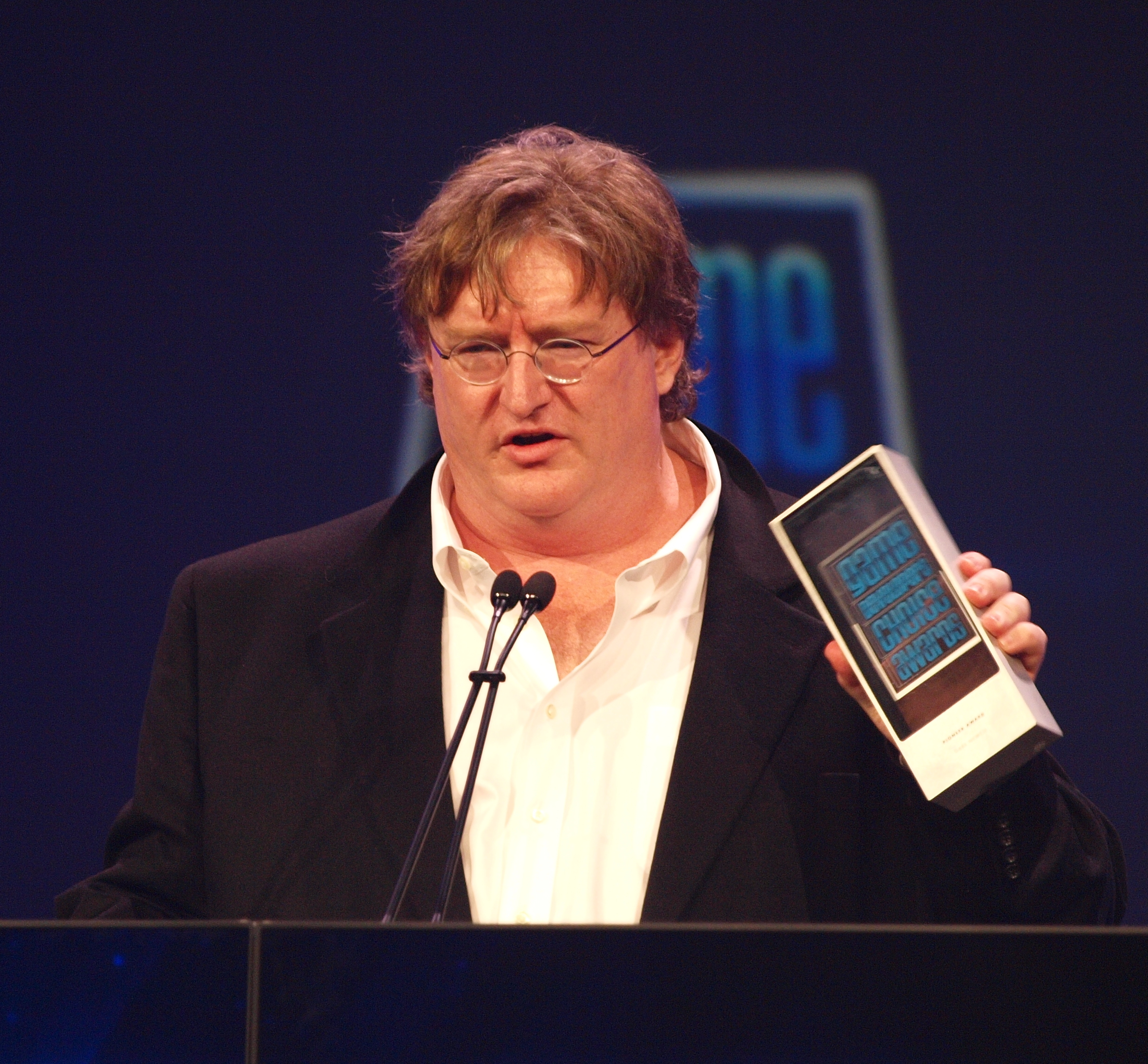
Gabe Newell, president of Valve, is credited with the concept behind the Potato Sack ARG.

The idea of the Potato Sack ARG came from Valve president Gabe Newell sometime around December 2010. Following on the success of the first ARG, he saw a way to promote both the highly anticipated Portal 2 release along with several independent games through a "Cross Game Design Event". Dejobaan Games' Leo Jaitley believed that Valve targeted developers that had proven track records of working with other developers, and not necessarily for the sales or popularity of the specific games. Valve invited the twenty independent developers to their headquarters on December 16, though did not explain the rationale for the visit. Only there did Valve explain the promotion, with the ultimate goal being the early release of Portal 2 at the conclusion of the ARG, according to Gaijin Games' CEO Alex Neuse. According to Rob Jagnow of Lazy 8 Studios, Valve assured the developers of an open relationship, stating that they had "No constraints. No NDAs." and that the project was "built on trust and mutual respect". Jaitley commented "most studios got involved knowing that there was likely to be some payoff, but without anything upfront or any promises of riches".

To help with the ARG, Valve gave the developers a free rein over the game's structure, and full access to Portal intellectual property to include within their games. Such assets included further voice work from Ellen McLain, the voice actress for GLaDOS, who recorded additional lines for the developers of the games to taunt the players with. Furthermore, the developers were given the opportunity to play what had existed of Portal 2 to build ideas for the ARG. Valve and the indie developers worked together over the next few days to design the ARG, creating the three phases, the timing between phases to allow for the puzzles to be solved, and the general fiction of the game. The developers decided to design the fiction of the ARG around the return of GLaDOS, who had been apparently destroyed at the end of Portal, leaving clues to her revival in the various games. The potato theme was based on Portal 2's fiction, in which, during a portion of the game, GLaDOS' personality is placed into a potato battery. To help promote the ARG, Valve and the developers arranged for the Potato Sack sale as to "make it easier for hard-core fans to participate in every aspect of the ARG".

Between the December meeting and second gathering in March 2011, prior to the ARG's launch, there was no direct verbal communication between Valve or the developers. Instead, the independent developers spent time, using a shared wiki provided by Valve, to plan out and coordinate the game. They also had to develop the new content for their games, which in most cases was work in addition to existing projects that they were presently undertaking. Others had to go back to older programming code and re-acquaint themselves with it before undertaking the new additions for the ARG. Valve's Jeep Barnett helped to coordinate the large effort. The second visit to Valve in March 2011 was to affirm the plans for the launch of the ARG.

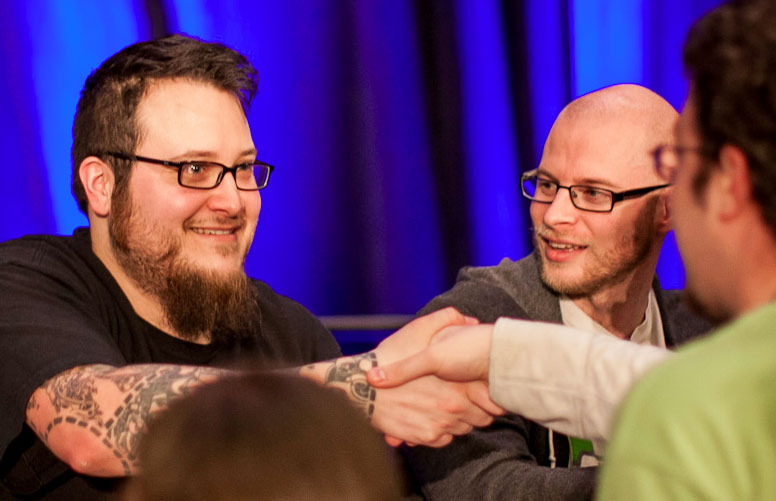
Edmund McMillen (left), one of the developers of Super Meat Boy and creators of the ARG

The first update was tied with April Fools' Day, with the addition of potatoes and gibberish sentences being in line with the pranks one normally sees on that day. Throughout the ARG, the players were monitored by the developers through the Internet Relay Chat, forums, and web sites that were being used to coordinate the solving effort. This allowed, for example, Two Tribes to prepare for Jake_R's visit, and the integration of a screenshot of the chat log into one of the puzzles. In another example, another chat room user, following a red herring, visited a physical location near the California studio for Team Meat; Edmund McMillen was able to arrange to meet the user and give him a signed copy of Super Meat Boy. Monitoring of the players enabled the developers to provide hints and clues for puzzles that players were struggling with as to allow the ARG to progress in a timely manner. While many puzzles of the ARG included cross-game clues—such as finding the password for one of the Aperture Science login screens from another game—Neuse felt they could have increased the cross-game complexity of the puzzles if they had more time to plan it out. The developers were aided by the agility of Valve in its participation. During the second phase, one of the developers asked if Newell would become involved in the ARG. Newell then fed the image with the encrypted message to media outlets. Valve also placed hidden messages in promotional videos for Portal 2 which helped to point the ARG players in specific directions, including calling some of the players out by name.

There were points during the ARG that players used unexpected means to solve a puzzle, but the developers and the player community worked around these issues. In some cases, players attempted to download beta versions of the patches to the games, but Valve was able to respond, usually in minutes, to block access to these. Valve also quickly responded to a web site that used Steam credentials to award players the potatoes without having to complete the target achievements; only about 1% of the potatoes were earned this way, and Valve later revoked them, though let players earn them again though legitimate means. Other players examined the files and binary code of the patched games to try to find password strings or other identifiers that would normally be seen only while playing the game. In at least one case, where this action served to reveal the solution to the puzzle before it was truly solved, the ARG players discouraged this behavior and apologized to Valve for these actions. When possible, the developers laid red herrings for those that tried to hack the ARG, including the use of Rickrolling.

Jagnow commented on several changes the developers would have made in hindsight after the completion of the ARG. One aspect he considered was the weak part of the fiction of the ARG, something he believed they would have integrated more in the game from the start. The release of the Potato Sack on April 1 may have been a bad decision according to Jagnow, as they did not get the press exposure they thought they would in conjunction with the other April Fool's events occurring that day, with some media outlets hesitant to report on potential pranks for fear of having to retract these later. In the third phase, where certain players were "taken over" by GLaDOS, Jagnow felt they extracted these players from the game too early as they were influential in coordinating the chat rooms and wiki, leaving the remaining players confused. Instead, Jagnow suggested they should have found a way to allow these players to continue participating until near the end. Jagnow considered the push of the crescendo of the ARG, the "appearance" of GLaDOS@Home, to have been the biggest failing. Originally scheduled for April 16 or 17, it was pushed to April 15 to allow more players, including international ones, to participate in the effort to release Portal 2 early, and to gain media attention. Instead, the developers found that existing players of the ARG were frustrated with no new puzzles to solve, while new players brought to the site by the media were skeptical and saw the event as "a cheap media ploy to get players to buy the Potato Sack in the hope of an early Portal 2 release".

== Reception ==
Overall, the alternate reality game received mixed response from gamers, some praising it as outstanding marketing between Portal 2 and the indie gamers, others considering it a way to force players to buy games they do not want to gain access to Portal 2 earlier. Pete Davison of GamePro considered it a "risky marketing move" that relied on Valve's long-standing reputation with the community to build on their trust, as well as a "hugely positive sign of support for indie games" from the company. David Ewalt of Forbes considered the tactic a huge benefit for the indie developers, whose games led Steam sales charts in the weeks leading to Portal 2's release. Ben Kuchera of Ars Technica noted that it was entirely possible to ignore the alternate reality game without any negative effects or losing any potential benefits. Luke Plunkett of Kotaku was more critical, commenting that for most players in North America, having the release only ten hours earlier—occurring overnight for many—would be "business as usual" in that they would not be able to play until the next day; thus, players that purchased and spent time in the Potato Sack games may have simply wasted their money for something they didn't want to gain almost nothing back. Leigh Alexander of Gamasutra also criticized the ARG for not providing an idea of the expectation of reward when it was successfully completed, comparing the ten-hour gain to a vignette in the movie A Christmas Story, where the main character after saving up money and waiting weeks for a secret decoder ring to decipher a message from a radio program, finds that the coded message is only an advertising blurb. Alexander suggested that instead, ARGs should give players an idea of the type of reward that may be offered, and then can exceed player's expectations when it is completed. Retailers in countries where the disc-based version of the game would have lagged a few days behind the Steam release opted to break their street date to avoid losing sales to the digital downloads.

Though direct sales from Steam are unknown, the Potato Sack ARG helped to boost sales of the independent games. The whole Potato Sack promotion was the second-highest selling compilation on Steam in the week prior to Portal 2's release, following Portal 2 itself and ahead of the Potato Sack/Portal 2 bundle. Dylan Fitterer, programmer for Audiosurf, noted that during the promotion, more than 6000 people were playing his game at a time, compared to 300 players before the event. Fitterer also saw an opportunity to create a new game based upon the ARG-themed addition to Audiosurf. Ichiro Lambe of Dejobaan Games was also pleased with the sales increased; while not a windfall, it helped him to continue to live comfortably. Thomas Grip of Frictional Games claimed that the boost of sales for Amnesia within the first two days of the Potato Sack sale completely covered the development costs for the added "Justine" content they had developed for the ARG. John Gibson of Tripwire Interactive believed that similar ARGs could be run in the future without the presence of a major title like Portal 2 as long as there is a significant payoff for the players.

Journalists noted that many of the user reviews for Portal 2 on Metacritic evoked negative opinion of the game, believed to be tied to the minimal impact on Portal 2's release time. These users cited complaints about the game being too short (with some saying it is only four hours long), the existence of paid downloadable content at launch for some versions, and supposed evidence that the game on Microsoft Windows and Mac OS X were ports of the console version. Journalists have defended Valve in these claims, countering that the game's length depends on the amount of immersion the player puts into the game, that the downloadable content is only cosmetic additions for the co-op mode, and that the quality of the graphics on the Windows and Mac version do not suggest a simple console port.
