= The Wonderful End of the World =

2008 video game

- Developer: Dejobaan Games
- Engine: Gamestudio
- Platform: Microsoft Windows
- Release: NA: January 25, 2008
- Genre: Action
- Mode: Single-player

The Wonderful End of the World is a 2008 video game made by Dejobaan Games. It involves a marionette that grabs as many objects as she can before the end of the world. It has been compared with Katamari Damacy due to their similar gameplay.

== Plot ==
The Wonderful End of the World is centered around Terra Nova, a goddess racing to save humanity from a mythological demon. Using a marionette, she sets out to save as much of Earth as possible before the apocalypse.

== Gameplay ==
In The Wonderful End of the World, the player takes control of a puppet that is able to grab small objects. The object of the game is to grab as many small objects as they can, growing bigger with each object consumed. The level ends once the player has consumed a predetermined number of objects. Once the level ends, the player receives a grade ranging from A+ to F. There is also an exploration mode, where there is no objective.

== Legacy ==
The Wonderful End of the World was updated shortly before the release of Portal 2 in 2011 as part of an alternate reality game. It was alongside several other games in the Potato Sack. A secret level containing Portal easter eggs and potatoes was added to the game. Once enough players found these potatoes, Portal 2 was released.
