= PitchYaGame =

Indie game showcase on Twitter

- PitchYaGame official logo
- Status: Active
- Genre: Social media showcase
- Frequency: June and November each year
- Venue: Twitter
- Years active: 2020–present
- Inaugurated: May 2020
- Founder: Liam Twose
- Website: pitchyagame.com

PitchYaGame or #PitchYaGame (sometimes abbreviated to PYG) is a volunteer movement hosted on the social media platform Twitter to showcase, and present awards for, independent video games from around the world.

== Description ==
PitchYaGame is hosted on the social media platform Twitter to showcase independent video games from around the world. Video pitches are presented by developers in June and November each year, and use the hashtag #PitchYaGame to identify and reference news about the showcase and the individual pitches, and the presentation of awards.

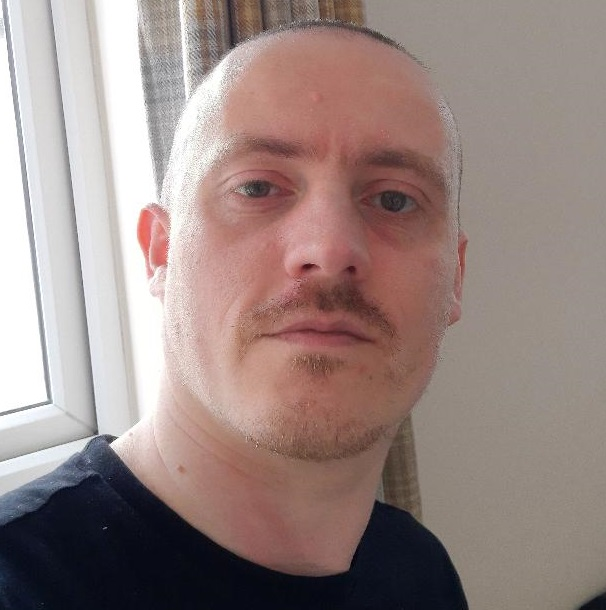
Liam Twose in 2023

The showcase was founded in May 2020 by Liam Twose, with the mission of recognising independent video games, and "focused on empowering indie game developers to strengthen their position in the industry." Twose has made clear that PitchYaGame is a showcase and not a hardcore competition, with "[j]ust enough of a push to make sure people put their best pitch forward."

The team now comprises Twose (@LiamTwose at Twitter), operations manager "Indie Game Lover" (@IndieGameLover), and host Sarah Clancy (@ImSarahNow).

The pitches were originally made monthly, with entries split into a number of categories, but this proved unmanageable. PitchYaGame collaborator, Sarah Clancy reported that judging the many entries on a monthly basis was "difficult and unwieldy." Therefore, pitches were later switched to six monthly, "feature creep" was reduced, and awards streamlined into gold, silver, bronze, runners-up, and most viral.

== Sponsorship ==
In June 2021, PitchYaGame prizes were sponsored by Xsolla, and in November 2021 by Aurora Punks and Cold Pixel. No cash prizes were available in 2022, as the organisers moved PitchYaGame into a less-competitive, "more showcase centric format".

== Reception ==
In October 2020, Elijah Beahm at The Escapist wrote that "One of the greatest challenges for any game is landing a solid pitch. You have to sell people, maybe even a publisher, to take your idea seriously. Most of the time, it's an obfuscated process that leaves the average developer scratching their heads, but Liam Twose and his team behind #PitchYaGame, 'PYG' for short, are looking to change all that with some clever social engineering."

In March 2021, Cameron Koch at GameSpot wrote that "Using the #PitchYaGame, thousands of indie developers tweeted out pitches for their games on November 2 as part of a social media contest, and the results are astounding." He went on to say that "There is no arguing with the results. According to Twose, around 1100-1300 games were shared with the hashtag, and some real gems look to have shined through."

In November 2021, Stafano "Stef" Castelli at IGN Italia wrote that "I myself enjoyed 'browsing through' the competitors, discovering a handful of intriguing video games in development." (translated from Italian).

In November 2022, Eric Bartelson at Premortem Games wrote that "It's a great way to get games noticed by fellow developers, but also publishers, investors and press."

In June 2023, Mark Plunkett in Kotaku wrote about the impossibility of keeping up with all the video game releases, and described PitchYaGame, which has attracted over 10,000 pitches since 2020, as an "astoundingly simple idea" that has "become an increasingly useful spot to catch up on some excellent-looking games that we may have otherwise completely slept on."

== See also ==
- Video game development
