= The Solus Project =

2016 video game

- Developers: Teotl Studios; Grip Digital
- Publishers: Teotl Studios; Grip Digital
- Engine: Unreal Engine 4
- Platforms: Microsoft Windows; Xbox One; PlayStation 4
- Release: Microsoft Windows; June 7, 2016; Xbox One; July 15, 2016; PlayStation 4 September 18, 2017
- Genre: Survival
- Mode: Single-player

The Solus Project is a first-person single-player survival video game developed by Teotl Studios and Grip Games. An early access version of the game was released on Steam, Xbox One and GOG in February 2016, and the full version of the game was released on June 7, 2016 on PC and July 15, 2016 for Xbox One . The game is a spiritual successor to previous Teotl title, The Ball.

== Gameplay ==
The Solus Project is an environmental survival-adventure game, in which the player controls an astronaut on a mission to save mankind. Their spacecraft crashes on an uncharted, alien planet, Gliese-6143-C. They have to survive on the planet and faces factors such as hunger level, thirst, body temperature or weather conditions. The player explores the planet full of temples and other places. Your character is the lone survivor of a crew looking for a colony, as mankind is on the verge of extinction. Plants grow and rot, weather changes from scorching heat to chilling storms, and the wind and humidity are unforgiving.

== Reception ==
The Solus Project has a score of 68, a "Mixed or Average" rating on Metacritic, based upon 27 reviews.

The Solus Project has 3 nominations for Czech Game of the Year Awards. It is nominated in categories Best audio, Best story and Best visuals.
