= Sjoerd Koppert =

Dutch record producer

Sjoerd Auke Koppert, a.k.a. Sjoko (born 1950, The Hague) is a Dutch-born recording engineer and producer who is now based in Carpinteria, California. He was the "sound guy" behind many successful Dutch bands in the early 70s, before going on to work with numerous high profile international artists. Since then, Sjoerd has built a solid background of expertise in the music industry, business development, and consultancy.

Sjoerd's involvement in the music industry started in the mid 60s, when Dutch bands like Golden Earring, Focus, Shocking Blue and various others broke through on the International scene. Recognized as one of the leading engineers in Europe at the time, he worked with many top acts, from The Who, Pink Floyd, ABBA, the Doors, Jefferson Airplane, the Beach Boys to Elton John, Rod Stewart, the Faces, The Rolling Stones, the Doobie Brothers, J. Geils, Frank Zappa, and many more. His sound design expertise also lead to the establishment of I.M.S. (International Music Services), which grew to become Europe's leading Sound Corporation at the time, as well as the development of the first live surround-sound (quadraphonic) systems (Pink Floyd, Golden Earring).

He left the music industry in the 80s in order to concentrate on "normal" business, and made a name for himself in corporate and logistics consultancy. After a period with Texas Instruments, where his marketing strategy and lobbying led to the acceptance of hand-held programmable calculators throughout the EEC's education system and a 78% market share for T.I., he accepted an offer from UK based Lex Service PLC. Starting with responsibility for project management and development strategy, he soon became an operating board member and strategist for Lex Specialist Transport division, consisting of a group of eight companies. After the Lex Group's decision to divest from their transport and logistics interests, Sjoerd had the task of arranging management buyouts and company sales – and managed to do so without the loss of a single job of the 14.000 jobs involved.

Left with the two largest of Lex's transport companies, he played a leading role in selling them to the US based Federal Express corporation, after which he joined the operating board of FedEx responsible for the launch and development of FedEx in Europe and the Middle East, a high profile and award winning corporate launch he completed in 1986. In 1988 Sjoerd left FedEx in order to establish a logistics and general business consultancy. He also decided that he wanted to bring his children up in a healthy environment and moved to a farm in rural North Yorkshire, U.K.

Sjoerd's consultancy business thrived, and he developed an interest in sustainable agriculture and development. His farm operated in an environmentally friendly and efficient manner, without the use of chemicals. In addition he was involved in the development of alternatives to hardwood for stabling, non-harmful timber preservatives and many other environmentally friendly projects.

In the meantime Sjoerd's consultancy practice undertook major corporate projects including; Massey Ferguson, the world's largest tractor manufacturer by restructuring their logistics and workflow practices, re-structuring logistics operations for corporations such as Mothercare, Jaguar, Boots, Saab, Volvo, Toyota, Fisher HiFi and others, before being recruited by the UK government to assist in the introduction of market economy practices to conglomerates in the former USSR.

He returned to music in the late 1990s, while working as an advisory board member and consultant for audio industry corporations such as JBL, Lucid, Symeterix. In 2001, he established a recording studio, Tantrum Studios, based in Santa Barbara, California. The design incorporated all Sjoerd had learned over the years. The studio is now gaining International recognition for its high quality sound and productions. One of its unique features is that only recycled or organic products have been used in its construction. Recycled rubber flooring, sound diffusion panel made from pressed straw, naturally dyed hemp cloth. Sjoerd established Tantrum Records in 2005, a production company and record label representing popular African artists.

As of the end of 2011 Sjoerd became the CEO of a new media corporation i.D.B. Media Group LLC, based in Carpinteria, California, USA. The corporation is in the process of building a new production facility. Incorporating the latest technology available the facility incorporates a sound stage, multi-room recording facility and editing suites. The corporation will incorporate Tantrum Records and its music production and will produce and distribute feature film and original television programming.

Apart from in music and business, Sjoko has achieved success in sailing, speed skating, car racing, and horse breeding.
