= Cogs (video game) =

2009 video game

- Icon of Cogs
- Developer(s): Lazy 8 Studios
- Platform(s): Windows, Mac OS X, iOS, Linux, PlayStation 3
- Release: 2009; 2011 (PS3)
- Genre(s): Puzzle
- Mode(s): Single-player

Cogs is a puzzle video game released in 2009 by Lazy 8 Studios, originally released as a Microsoft Windows title, but receiving subsequent ports to other operating systems, mobile platforms, and game consoles. The game requires the player to manipulate a three-dimensional object's sides as sliding block puzzles as to complete specific goals, such as meshing gears to complete a clockwork mechanism or routing gas flow through pipes to a balloon.

Cogs was named as the 2010 Indie Game Challenge Grand Prize winner.

== Gameplay ==
Cogs screenshot showing the "Siege Engine" puzzle; this puzzle involves both gears (left face) and pipes (right face) that must be manipulated ultimately to turn the device's wheels.

Cogs is built on a number of puzzles that mimic sliding block puzzles. Each level, representing some three-dimensional object, has various objectives, but generally involve moving tiles to connect sets of gears, piping, and other physical elements to make that object behave in a specific manner, such as providing gear power to turn wheels. As objects are three dimensional, the player may need to manipulate puzzles on multiple faces or faces that wrap around the object, or consider the front and back-sides of tiles. The player is free to rotate the virtual object to identify how to arrange the tiles correctly.

The basic physical elements that the player may need to manipulate include: gears which can turn other gears it is meshed with as well as transmission gears of different sizes that affect the rate of rotation of subsequent gears; pipes which carry (coloured) steam or gas, which may be necessary to drive motors for the gears or fill balloons; and bell strikers, which must be set at the right time to make a specific melody for the puzzle. Early puzzles features one type of mechanic, but later puzzles may include many of these spread on multiple faces.

The player can earn up to ten stars for completing a puzzle; three stars are awarded for completing the puzzle, and the player can earn an additional zero to three stars based on the number of moves and the time needed to complete the puzzle. Earning the maximum number of stars in each category awards the player a tenth final star. The player unlocks more puzzles by earning more stars.

Each puzzle also features a special challenge mode to finish the puzzle within a few seconds or with a limited number of moves; completing these earns additional stars for the player.

== Ports ==
Cogs was available for Microsoft Windows, Mac OS X, and iOS upon release. The game was released on Linux in July 2011 as a part of the Humble Indie Bundle 3. A version for Android was released in the Humble Bundle for Android 2. A 3D version was released in PlayStation Home (the PlayStation 3's social gaming network) on November 3, 2011. In 2025, the game was ported to Unity3D and was released as an updated version on Steam for existing owners.

== Reception ==
Cogs was, in 2010, the Grand Prize Winner at the Indie Game Challenge, in the professional category, having also received the Achievement in Art Direction and Achievement in Gameplay on the same contest. The game was also a finalist at the 2010 Independent Games Festival and 2009 IndieCade Cogs was one of thirteen games that were part of the alternative reality game, the Potato Sack that preluded the release of Portal 2; during this time, additional puzzles relating to the Potato Sack and Portal 2 were added to the game.
