= Groovin' Blocks =

2008 video game

- Developer: Empty Clip Studios
- Publishers: Zoo Publishing; Sony Online Entertainment
- Platforms: iPhone OS, Wii, WiiWare, PlayStation Network
- Release: WiiWare: NA: September 8, 2008; Wii: NA: August 11, 2009; iOS: NA: October 24, 2009; PlayStation Network: NA: March 18, 2010
- Genre: Puzzle
- Modes: Single-player, multiplayer

Groovin' Blocks is a puzzle video game for Wii by Empty Clip Studios. It was released in North America on September 8, 2008 as a downloadable WiiWare game. It was also released as an expanded retail of the game in North America on August 11, 2009. The game was later released for the iPhone OS platform and on PlayStation Network on March 18, 2010.

== Gameplay ==
Groovin' Blocks is a falling block-type puzzle game with gameplay that has been likened to Columns and Lumines. The game sees players having to clear lines of three or more blocks of the same color, and like Columns players can cycle through the falling lines of blocks, with adjacent blocks of the same color also disappearing with the matched lines. In addition, extra points can be scored when players bring their falling blocks down to the downbeats (called "Superbeats") of the game's electronica soundtrack, adding to a score multiplier.

By setting high scores, players collect stars to unlock new songs and power-ups. Unlike most puzzle games which are played to infinity, each stage in Groovin' Blocks lasts for the duration of the song if the player has not yet failed the stage by filling their play area with blocks.

The game also features offline two player competitive and co-operative modes, as well as an option for colorblind players that turns the different colored blocks into shapes.

== Reception ==
Reception

Aggregate scores
Aggregator	Score
GameRankings	PS3: 75.17% Wii: 75.46%
Metacritic	PS3: 68/100; Wii: 75/100

Review scores
Publication	Score
GamePro	4/5
GameZone	6.8/10
IGN	PS3: 7.5/10; Wii: 7.6/10
Nintendo Life	7/10
Nintendo World Report	8.5/10

Groovin' Blocks received mixed reviews from critics upon release, with the Wii version getting more positive reviews compared to the PlayStation 3 version. On Metacritic, the game holds scores of 68/100 for the PlayStation 3 version based on 6 reviews, and 75/100 for the Wii version based on 13 reviews. On GameRankings, the game holds scores of 75.17% for the PlayStation 3 version based on 6 reviews, and 75.46% for the Wii version based on 13 reviews.

IGN gave the Wii version of Groovin' Blocks a 7.6/10, calling the game a fun "one trick pony" and a "pretty impressive" first effort from the developers. Siliconera called it "a deceptively addictive, fun little gem" that is "a great hybrid of the puzzle and music genres".
