= AaAaAA!!! – A Reckless Disregard for Gravity =

2009 video game

AaaaaAAaaaAAAaaAAAAaAAAAA!!! — A Reckless Disregard for Gravity
- Developer: Dejobaan Games
- Publisher: Dejobaan Games
- Platforms: iOS; Windows; OnLive
- Release: WW: September 3, 2009
- Genre: Action
- Mode: Single-player

AaaaaAAaaaAAAaaAAAAaAAAAA!!! — A Reckless Disregard for Gravity (officially abbreviated as AaAaAA!!! – A Reckless Disregard for Gravity) is a 2009 video game developed by Dejobaan Games for Microsoft Windows. Taking place in the year 2011 in an alternate reality version of Boston, Massachusetts, players BASE jump from the highest building, trying to get the highest possible score.

== Gameplay ==
AaAaAA!!! – A Reckless Disregard for Gravity is a game where players BASE jump headfirst from the top of the highest building downwards. The game is viewed in a 3D first-person perspective. Players score points by flying near objects on the way down, smashing through various colored glass plates, landing via parachute on a designated drop zone. Players also receive points for "kissing" (flying very close to) buildings or other airborne obstacles, and for "hugging" (remaining in close proximity to) these obstacles as they fall. Players receive bonus points for "threading the needle", spraying paint on buildings, giving a thumbs-up to fans and making rude gestures to protestors. Players can also score points by hitting a bird. Hugs and kisses are the main way to increase score. Structures, obstacles, and objects vary amongst levels. Some levels feature mountain slopes, floating and/or moving structures, birds, and abstract art.

Players are rated for how well they jump, and they attain "teeth" for achieving certain benchmark high scores on jumps. Teeth allow players to unlock new levels, items (which includes espresso to help slow down jumps, graffiti to spray on buildings, and a glove designed to give a thumbs up to supporters or a two-fingered salute to protesters), and other obscure things such as guided meditations and pig de-bristling techniques. Earning high enough scores allows players to post their scores on online leaderboards. Developers say the game was inspired by BASE jumping in a wingsuit.

== Development ==
The first version of AaAaAA!!! was a prototype that was based on people who were base jumping off the side of a mountain. One of the challenges of developing this game was building a core gameplay mechanic and then simplifying it down to what was necessary. It was then developed as a spin-off of a previous game, Inago Rage. Some of the influences during the development were Alternate Reality: The City, M.U.L.E. and Koronis Rift.

== Reception ==
Reception

Aggregate score
Aggregator	Score
Metacritic	81/100 (PC)

Review scores
Publication	Score
Destructoid	8/10
GamesRadar+	4.5/5
PC Gamer (UK)	79/100
Macworld	3.5/5
The A.V. Club	A

AaAaAA!!! – A Reckless Disregard for Gravity has received generally favorable reviews, as seen by the aggregate scores of 81/100 at Metacritic. The game was a 2010 Independent Games Festival finalist for Excellence in Design. It was recognized by Guinness World Records for the "longest word in the title of a commercially released video game", being 28 characters long.

== Legacy ==
In 2011 an updated version, subtitled For the Awesome, was released in collaboration with Owlchemy Labs. It includes several graphical upgrades and new expert levels, as well as every level from the original game. Also added to this version was support for the Oculus Rift Virtual reality head-mounted display (HMD).

In 2012, again in collaboration with Owlchemy Labs, mobile port Force = Mass x Acceleration was released for iOS and Android. The game currently has a rating of 90% on Metacritic based on 12 critic reviews.

In a third collaboration with Owlchemy Labs, a second Android port titled Caaaardboard!!!! (AaAaAA! Cardboard Edition!) was released in 2014, designed solely for use with the Google Cardboard virtual reality platform.
