= Stealth game =

Video game genre

A stealth game is a type of video game in which the player primarily uses stealth to avoid or overcome opponents. Games in the genre typically allow the player to remain undetected by hiding, sneaking, or using disguises. Some games allow the player to choose between a stealthy approach or directly attacking antagonists, but rewarding the player for greater use of stealth. The genre has employed espionage, counter-terrorism, and rogue themes, with protagonists that are special forces operatives, special agents, secret agents, thieves, ninjas, or assassins. Some games have also combined stealth elements with other genres, such as first-person shooters and also platformers.

Elements of "stealth" gameplay, by way of avoiding confrontation with enemies, can be attributed to a diverse range of games, including Pac-Man (1980). Early maze games have been credited with spawning the genre, including Manbiki Shounen (1979), Lupin III (1980), Castle Wolfenstein (1981), 005 (1981), and Metal Gear (1987). The genre became a mainstream success in 1998, with Tenchu: Stealth Assassins, Metal Gear Solid, and Thief: The Dark Project. They were followed by later releases, like Hitman and Tom Clancy's Splinter Cell.

== Definition ==
Unlike most action games, stealth games challenge the player to avoid alerting enemies altogether. The core gameplay elements of the modern stealth game are to avoid combat, minimize making noise, and strike enemies from the shadows and behind. Completing objectives without being detected by any enemy, sometimes referred to as "ghosting" is a common approach to stealth games. Avoiding detection may be the only way to successfully complete a game, but there are usually multiple ways to achieve a goal with different pathways or styles of play. Players can hide behind objects or in shadows, and can strike or run past an enemy when the enemy is facing the other way. If the player attracts the attention of enemies, they may be able to hide and wait until the enemies abandon their search. Thus, planning becomes important, as does trial-and-error. Some stealth games put more emphasis on physical combat skill when the player is spotted. Some games offer a choice between killing or merely knocking out an enemy. When ghosting is optional, or not well-supported by a game, players may still attempt to avoid combat for moral reasons or as a demonstration of skill. Early on in the development of the stealth genre these games were referred to as sneak 'em up games.

== Game design ==
'Soliton Radar' feature in the Metal Gear series. The player has a radar with the location and field of view at the enemies, in order to plan the path in advance.

When hiding in the dark is a gameplay element, light and shadow become important parts of the level design. Usually the player is able to disable certain light sources. Stealth games also emphasize the audio design when players must be able to hear the subtle sound effects that may alert enemies to their actions; noise will often vary as the player walks on different surfaces such as wood or metal. Players who move recklessly will make more noise and attract more attention.

In order for a game to include stealth gameplay, the knowledge of the artificial intelligence (AI) must be restricted to make it ignorant to parts of the game world. The AI in stealth games takes into specific consideration the enemies' reactions to the effects of the player's actions, such as turning off the lights, as opposed to merely reacting to the player directly. Enemies typically have a line of sight which the player can avoid by hiding behind objects, staying in the shadows or moving while the enemy is facing another direction. Enemies can also typically detect when the player touches them or moves within a small, fixed distance. Overall, stealth games vary in what player actions the AI will perceive and react to, with more recent games offering a wider range of enemy reactions. Often, the AI's movements are predictable and regular, allowing the player to devise a strategy to overcome their adversaries.

One staple of many stealth games is an alarm phase or an alert phase, in which enemies more aggressively seek out the player character. Players can evade capture or engage in combat. This mechanic can also be used to increase difficulty over the course of the game, with missions that end immediately when the alarm phase is activated.

Players are often given limited methods of engaging opponents directly in stealth games, either by restricting the player to ineffective or non-lethal weapons, equipping adversaries with far superior equipment and numbers, or providing the player with a limited amount of health that makes most combat scenarios extremely dangerous. Stealth games sometimes overlap with the survival horror genre, in which players are forced to hide from and evade supernatural or occasionally mundane enemies as they attempt to track down the player.

While early stealth games relied on small maps and simple hitboxes, 3D stealth games have introduced more complex environments. Modern stealth games often give players the ability to quickly climb or maneuver objects, take cover with hotkeys, or mark a series of enemies for attack.

== History ==
=== Early developments: 1979–1997 ===
According to Retro Gamer's John Szczepaniak, the first stealth game was Manbiki Shounen (Shoplifting Boy), published in November 1979. Published as a type-in program for the PET 2001 in RAM magazine in February 1980, it was developed by Hiroshi Suzuki and involves a boy entering a convenience store and attempting to shoplift by stealing "$" symbols while avoiding the line-of-sight detection of the owner. If caught, the player is led away by the police. Suzuki presented the game to developer Taito, which used it as inspiration for their similar stealth arcade game, Lupin III (based on the manga and anime of the same name), released in April 1980. In November 1980, Suzuki developed a sequel, Manbiki Shoujo (Shoplifting Girl).

Castle Wolfenstein, originally available in 1981, employed stealth elements as a focus of the gameplay. Players were charged with traversing the levels of Castle Wolfenstein, stealing secret plans and escaping. Players could acquire uniforms to disguise themselves and walk by guards undetected. Beyond Castle Wolfenstein, released in 1984, included some additions to its predecessor, such as a dagger for close-range kills and a greater emphasis on disguising in enemy uniform. id Software's updated 1992 remake Wolfenstein 3D was originally going to feature some of the original's stealth gameplay, such as body hiding, but this was cut to make the game faster paced. As a result of these changes, Wolfenstein would instead pave the way for later 3D action games, specifically first-person shooters.

In 1981, Sega released an arcade game called 005 in which the player's mission is to take a briefcase of secret documents to a waiting helicopter while avoiding enemy flashlights and use boxes as hiding spots. 005 holds the Guinness World Record for being the first stealth game. Mindscape's Infiltrator, released in 1986, combined a flight simulator with a stealth-based "ground mission". In this ground mission, the protagonist attempts to sneak into enemy territory using false IDs to avoid detection and knock-out gas to incapacitate enemies. The goal of this mission is to photograph secret documents while avoiding alarms.

Hideo Kojima's Metal Gear, released in 1987 for the MSX2 and the Nintendo Entertainment System in 1988, utilized stealth elements within an action-adventure framework, and was the first mainstream stealth game to be released on consoles. Since the MSX2 was not available in North America, only the NES version was released there. Metal Gear placed a greater emphasis on stealth than other games of its time, with the player character Solid Snake beginning without any weapons (requiring him to avoid confrontation until weapons are found) and having limited ammunition for each weapon. Enemies are able to see Snake from a distance (using a line-of-sight mechanic) and hear gunshots from non-silenced weapons; security cameras and sensors are placed at various locations, and a security alarm sounds whenever Snake is spotted and causes all enemies on screen to chase him. Snake could also disguise himself in enemy uniform or a cardboard box, and use hand-to-hand combat to fight enemies. In 1988, Infogrames published Hostages, sometimes known as Rescue: The Embassy Mission. One of the game's three main segments required players to evade searchlights by rolling and ducking into doorways. GameSpot has observed that the game "set important grounds and ideas for future stealth/tactical shooters," noting the game's use of time limits, cover mechanics, and tests of reflexes.

The sequel Metal Gear 2: Solid Snake was released in 1990 for the MSX2. It further evolved the stealth gameplay of its predecessor and introduced most of the gameplay elements present in Metal Gear Solid, including the three-dimensional element of height, allowing players to crouch and crawl into hiding spots and air ducts and underneath desks. The player could also distract guards by knocking on surfaces and use a radar to plan ahead. The enemies had improved AI, including a 45-degree field of vision, turning their heads left and right to see diagonally, the detection of various different noises, being able to move from screen to screen (they were limited to a single screen in earlier games), and a three-phase security alarm (where reinforcements are called in to chase the intruder, then remain on the lookout for some time after losing sight of the intruder, and then leave the area). The game also had a complex storyline and improved graphics.

=== Establishing a genre: 1998–2002 ===
Although stealth gameplay had appeared in previous games, 1998 is seen as a turning point in gaming history because of the release of Tenchu: Stealth Assassins, Metal Gear Solid, and Thief: The Dark Project. The ninja-themed Tenchu: Stealth Assassins was the first 3D stealth based-game. Months later, the highly anticipated Metal Gear Solid transformed its modestly successful franchise into a mainstream success. The increased power of the PlayStation console over previous platforms allowed for greater immersion in terms of both story and game environment. Metal Gear Solid has been credited with popularizing the stealth genre. Thief: The Dark Project is also credited as a pioneer of the genre. It was the first stealth game using the first-person perspective, dubbed a "first-person sneaker". Among its contributions to the stealth game was the impact of light and dark areas, the latter which could be used for concealment, and the sound design approach that allowed players to track the movement of unseen enemies, while at the same time making the player-character's movement across certain surfaces louder, such as on stone, than on other surfaces, like carpetting, and helping in their stealth.

With further releases, many games in the genre drifted towards action by allowing the option of direct confrontations. The Hitman series, the first installment of which was released in 2000, allowed this play style, but rewarded the player for stealthy and elaborate assassination of antagonists. Hitman: Codename 47, the first of the series, was the first 3D game to employ the genre's device of disguises. The Operative: No One Lives Forever, an espionage themed parody also released in 2000, again allowed the player to combine or choose between stealth and overt violence. In 2000, the first-person action role-playing game Deus Ex also allowed the player the choice of taking a stealth approach. A USA Today reviewer found "At the easiest difficulty setting, your character is pureed again and again by an onslaught of human and robotic terrorists until you learn the value of stealth."

1998 also saw the release of Commandos: Behind Enemy Lines, a real-time tactics game with heavy stealth gameplay. Players control a team of several soldiers, each with different limited sets of abilities. Missions are completed by navigating or clearing densely layered enemies patrols with "vision cones", similar to the Soliton radar in Metal Gear Solid. The game is recognized for its difficulty, demanding precision and memorization of hot keys. Commandos gave rise to other sequels along with third-party clones such as the Desperados series and Robin Hood: The Legend of Sherwood.

Metal Gear Solid 2: Sons of Liberty, released 2001 for the PlayStation 2, further evolved the stealth gameplay series. It featured an array of new abilities, including "leaping over and hanging off of railings, opening and hiding in storage lockers," and sneaking up behind enemies to "hold them at gunpoint for items and ammunition." Metal Gear Solid 2 holds a Guinness World Record for being the first stealth game to feature collective artificial intelligence. Metal Gear Solid 2: Sons of Liberty sold 7 million units in sales, followed by Metal Gear Solid with 6 million units.

=== Later developments: 2002–2012 ===
Tom Clancy's Splinter Cell (2002) featured a light-based visibility meter which determined how much the player was visible.

After the mainstream success of the genre, stealth elements became increasingly incorporated into a wide range of video games, with numerous action games using stealth elements in some way or another. In 2002, the first installment of the Tom Clancy licensed Splinter Cell series was released, which attempted to add more realism to the stealth genre both in terms of graphics and in-game equipment. If the player is discovered in Splinter Cell, the guards will often raise a general alarm which can cause a difficulty spike or even result in automatic mission failure. Clint Hocking, who worked as a level designer for Splinter Cell, noted that this mechanic was in place at this point because the gameplay developers could not easily implement alternative player actions in the case of such detection; for example, on detection, a real agent may react by subduing the agent that found them, but this was not possible to program in at this point in time. Hocking recognized this would be frustrating to the player and would remain an issue with stealth games for about a decade. In addition, Splinter Cell was notable for its state of the art graphics, including dynamic lighting and shadows. Like Thief, Splinter Cell featured a visibility meter which determined how much light was falling on the character. These effects not only contributed to the atmosphere of the game, but dynamically affected in which areas the player could hide. The 2004 sequel, Tom Clancy's Splinter Cell: Pandora Tomorrow, added a multiplayer component to the stealth genre.

The growth of the genre also led to the production of a number of E-rated stealth platformers aimed at younger audiences, most notably Sly Cooper, a cel-shaded game released in 2002. Other related games include 2001 Looney Tunes game Sheep, Dog 'n' Wolf and the 2000 movie tie-in game The Grinch. Later, in 2005, Ape Escape 3 featured a mini-game based on the Metal Gear Solid series.

Developers continued to meld stealth with other genres. 2003's Siren combined the survival horror genre with the stealth genre. Its sequel would later be released in 2006, with refined game mechanics and expanded difficulty options. Manhunt employed a snuff movie theme and allowed the player to kill antagonists with varying levels of violence, dependent on how much time was spent sneaking behind them. It was the first to show visual executions in the genre. The following year, Konami's Metal Gear Acid combined the stealth gameplay of the Metal Gear series with turn-based strategy and tactical role-playing game elements as well as card battle elements from Konami's own Yu-Gi-Oh! games.

Metal Gear Solid 3: Snake Eater (2004) introduced camouflage to the stealth genre as can be seen with the "camo index" in the top-right corner.

In 2004, Metal Gear Solid 3: Snake Eater introduced camouflage to the genre. Set in a jungle, the game emphasized infiltration in a natural environment, along with survival aspects such as food capture, healing, and close-quarters combat. The game was also notable for its infamous stealth battle with a sniper, in which the player confronts the nearly invisible enemy in a boss fight that can take hours to complete. The following year, the updated version Metal Gear Solid 3: Subsistence added an online multiplayer mode to the game with stealth elements.

Another 2004 release was The Chronicles of Riddick: Escape from Butcher Bay, based on the Chronicles of Riddick series of movies. The game follows the character of Riddick as he attempts to escape from prison. Action and stealth gaming are combined seamlessly by allowing the character to hide, sneak, or fight his way past most situations. The game was critically acclaimed, and was followed with The Chronicles of Riddick: Assault on Dark Athena in 2009.

Hitman: Blood Money released in 2006 and introduced a "notoriety" system where the player's actions in missions affect the difficulty of the stealth gameplay. If Agent 47 is recorded by camera surveillance or witnessed committing a crime, his notoriety will rise and NPCs will be able to spot him more easily in later missions. Conversely, eliminating witnesses, destroying surveillance footage, or bribing officials will reduce notoriety.

In 2007, Assassin's Creed employed a social element to the stealth game, where the player is able to hide among crowds of civilians by taking care to blend in. Stealth elements were incorporated into Crytek's open world first-person shooter Crysis, multiplayer first-person shooter Team Fortress 2, and first-person role-playing game Fallout 3. Call of Duty 4: Modern Warfare included a stealth mission called "All Ghillied Up" which has been considered one of greatest levels in video game history by critics.

Also in 2007, Ben Yahtzee Croshaw published Trilby: The Art of Theft, one of the first indie stealth games. The game features a rudimentary engine built in Adventure Game Studio. Because of this restricted approach, the game's maps are largely static building cutaways. Trilby's graphical style, combined with its stealth gameplay, has drawn comparisons to 1990's Bonanza Bros. In turn, Trilby likely influenced later indie stealth games such as 2013's Gunpoint and 2015's Master Spy.

In 2008, Metal Gear Solid 4: Guns of the Patriots introduced a battlezone element, where the stealth gameplay is incorporated into a battlefield fought between two armies, both of which can be infiltrated by Solid Snake.

In 2009, Assassin's Creed II broadened its predecessor's elements of stealth by allowing the player to blend among any group of civilians, rather than specific ones. Assassin's Creed II also allowed the player to distract guards by tossing coins or by hiring thieves and courtesans, and also featured a notoriety level, which made the player more recognizable until they paid off officials or tore down wanted posters. The same year, Uncharted 2: Among Thieves and Batman: Arkham Asylum incorporated stealth elements in different segments of the games. The multiplayer modes of Aliens vs. Predator in 2010 and Killzone 3 in 2011 also incorporated stealth elements.

In 2009, independent developers began to work on a recreation of Thief called The Dark Mod. The project began as a mod of Doom 3 but became a standalone project as of 2013. It features approximately 150 community-built missions and is one of the only open-source stealth games in development.

2010 saw the release of Assassin's Creed: Brotherhood, the sequel to Assassin's Creed II, which is notable for continuing to evolve the series' social stealth elements by introducing a multiplayer component where players must hide in crowds from other rival assassins.

=== Recent developments: 2012–present ===
The 2012 game Dishonored tried to incorporate stealth elements that were influenced by Thief, such as the importance of lighting and shadows. The developers later abandoned that system citing realism as a factor. The game instead relies on a system of "occlusion-based" stealth, using the vision cones of the enemies, obstacles, and special abilities which determines whether or not the character is visible. Additionally, while other games had implemented such systems, Dishonored was recognized for having a forgiving stealth system compared with Splinter Cell, in that if detected, the player had several options available to either attack those enemies that detected them, distract them, or flee and outrun them by using parkour, rather than immediately reaching a "game over". Forbes called Dishonored one of the best stealth games of 2012, along with Hitman: Absolution and Mark of the Ninja. A sequel, Dishonored 2, released in 2016 and was praised for improving upon the stealth elements of its predecessor.

Mark of the Ninja put a twist on the stealth genre in that it is a 2D side-scroller. This posed some unique factors, such as the lack of corners for the character to hide behind, and the visibility presented in a side-scroller; the developers overcame this by adding 'fog' that prevents the player from seeing things that the character can not see, visually representing enemy line-of-sight and even visualizing the noise made by the character, including how far that noise travels. After the completion of the game, the player has access to a harder difficulty called "New Game Plus", which further decreases visibility by adding fog behind the player and removes noise visualizations and enemy line of sight indicators.

Throughout the 2010s, stronger technology allowed for larger environments and spurred the development of next-gen entries in existing stealth franchises. 2015's Metal Gear Solid V: The Phantom Pain concluded the main Metal Gear series, introducing an open-world for the first time in the franchise. In 2016, Deus Ex: Mankind Divided took a similar approach with a semi-open world designed around city hubs. 2016's Hitman reboot also drastically increased the size of its game maps.

2013's Splinter Cell: Blacklist was considered a return to form after 2010's controversial entry, Splinter Cell: Conviction, which departed from the series formula by forcing combat. Blacklist retained some of the modern conventions of the previous entry, most notably context actions, and was recognized for balancing action gameplay with pure stealth options. 2013 also saw the release of Payday 2 and the top-down Monaco: What's Yours Is Mine, both of which are cooperative stealth games focused around heists.

Between 2013 and 2016, République reunited some of the developers and cast of the Metal Gear series in an episodic point-and-click stealth game. The game's unique play style required users to hack doors and surveillance systems from a bird's eye view in order to navigate their character through the environment.

In 2014, Creative Assembly released Alien: Isolation, a stealth game which emphasized survival-horror. In this game, the protagonist is trapped on a space station with an alien xenomorph which they must avoid for the majority of the game, being unable to kill it. The game also uses feedback from the player's microphone to enhance gameplay as the alien is able to hear noises made by the player and can use them to detect their location.

2014's Styx: Master of Shadows was recognized by many reviewers as a "pure stealth" game that discouraged combat. It also provided a distinctive scouting game mechanic through the use of clones.

2016 saw a comeback of Commandos-like stealth games with the release of Shadow Tactics: Blades of the Shogun, published nine years after the previous Commandos-style game Helldorado. In 2020 Shadow Tactics developer Mimimi Games produced a new entry in the Desperados series, titled Desperados III. In 2021 the developer announced a standalone expansion to Shadow Tactics called Aiko's Choice.

Recent years have also seen procedurally generated and randomized stealth games including 2015's turn-based Invisible Inc, and 2017's top-down action stealth game Heat Signature.

In 2019, Asobo Studio's A Plague Tale: Innocence and FromSoftware's Sekiro: Shadows Die Twice were recognized for their stealth elements. 2019 also saw Untitled Goose Game by Australian developer House House utilize stealth as a major mechanic alongside the otherwise comedic tone of the game, leading to comparisons to Metal Gear Solid and Hitman.

In 2020, The Last of Us Part II released which has been praised for how its level design encourages sneaking around enemies using stealth during combat encounters. It was also praised for its AI, enemies will search for the player using tracking dogs and change their search patterns upon finding dead bodies.

2021's Hitman 3 concluded the "World of Assassination" trilogy and was highly praised for its sandbox and social stealth elements, with PC Gamer calling it the best stealth game of the year.

A recent development in the stealth genre has been the rise of multiplayer stealth games using elements from social deduction games like Werewolf or Mafia. Games like Among Us and SpyParty are all about "hiding in plain sight" and blending in to avoid detection from other players. This has the benefit of providing a "real" stealth experience compared to a singleplayer game and acts as a continuation of the trend pioneered by the multiplayer portion of Assassin's Creed: Brotherhood.
