= Action-adventure game =

Video game genre

An action-adventure game is a video game hybrid genre that combines core elements from both the action game and adventure game genres.

== Definition ==
An action adventure game can be defined as a game with a mix of elements from an action game and an adventure game, especially crucial elements like puzzles. Action-adventures require many of the same physical skills as action games, but may also offer a storyline, numerous characters, an inventory system, dialogue, and other features of adventure games. They are typically faster-paced than pure adventure games, because they include both physical and conceptual challenges. Action-adventure games normally include a combination of complex story elements, which are often displayed for players using audio and video. The story is heavily reliant upon the player character's movement, which triggers story events and thus affects the flow of the game. Popular examples of action-adventure games include The Legend of Zelda, God of War, Grand Theft Auto, and the Tomb Raider series.

=== Relationship to other genres ===
There is a good deal of controversy over what actually constitutes an action-adventure game. One definition of the term "action-adventure" is: "An action/adventure game is a game that has enough action in it not to be called an adventure game, but not enough action to be called an action game." In some cases, an action game with puzzles will be classified as an action-adventure game, but if these puzzles are quite simple they might be classified as an action game. Others see action games as a pure genre, while action-adventure games are action games that include situational problem-solving. Adventure gamers may also be purists, rejecting games that make use of physical challenges or time pressure. Regardless, the action-adventure label is widely used in articles on the internet and in the media. The term "action-adventure" is often used as a broad label encompassing several subgenres due to its wide scope.

== Subgenres ==
Although action-adventure games are diverse and difficult to classify, there are some distinct subgenres. Popular subgenres include:

=== Grand Theft Auto clone ===
A Grand Theft Auto clone belongs to a subgenre of open world action-adventure video games in the third-person perspective. They are characterized by their likeness to the Grand Theft Auto series in either gameplay or overall design. In these types of open world games, players may find and use a variety of vehicles and weapons while roaming freely in an open world setting.

=== Metroidvania ===
Metroidvania is a portmanteau of Metroid and Castlevania; such games are sometimes referred to as "search action", and are generally based on two-dimensional platformers. They emphasize both exploration and puzzle-solving with traditional platform gameplay.

=== Survival horror ===
Survival horror games emphasize "inventory management" and making sure the player has enough ammunition and recovery items to "survive" the horror setting. This is a thematic genre with diverse gameplay, so not all survival horror games share all the features. The Resident Evil franchise popularized this subgenre.

=== Zelda-like ===
Many games with gameplay similar to those in The Legend of Zelda series are called Zelda clones or Zelda-like games.

== Gameplay ==
Action-adventure games are faster-paced than pure adventure games, and include physical as well as conceptual challenges where the story is enacted rather than narrated. While motion-based, often reflexive, actions are required, the gameplay still follows a number of adventure game genre tropes (gathering items, exploration of and interaction with one's environment, often including an overworld connecting areas of importance, and puzzle-solving). While the controls are arcade-style (character movement, few action commands) there is an ultimate goal beyond a high score. In most action-adventure games, the player controls a single avatar as the protagonist. This type of game is often quite similar to role-playing video games.

They are distinct from graphic adventures, which sometimes have free-moving central characters, but also a wider variety of commands and fewer or no action game elements and are distinct too from text adventures, characterized by many different commands introduced by the user via a complex text parser and no free-moving character. While they share general gameplay dynamics, action-adventures vary widely in the design of their viewpoints, including bird's eye, side-scrolling, first-person, third-person, over-the-shoulder, or even a 3/4 isometric view.

Many action-adventure games simulate a conversation through a conversation tree. When the player encounters a non-player character, they are allowed to select a choice of what to say. The NPC gives a scripted response to the player, and the game offers the player several new ways to respond.

Due to the action-adventure subgenre's broad and inclusive nature, it causes some players to have difficulty finishing a particular game. Companies have devised ways to give the player help, such as offering clues or allowing the player to skip puzzles to compensate for this lack of ability.

== History ==
=== 1979–1983: Precursors ===
Several games prior to 1984 are considered precursors to the action-adventure genre. Superman (Atari, 1979) is cited by Brett Weiss as an early action-adventure game, with Retro Gamer crediting it as the "first to utilize multiple screens as playing area". Mark J.P. Wolf credits Adventure (1980) for the Atari VCS as the earliest-known action-adventure game. The game involves exploring a 2D environment, finding and using items which each have prescribed abilities, and fighting dragons in real-time like in an action game. Muse Software's Castle Wolfenstein (1981) further expanded the formula by combining maze-like exploration, stealth, combat, and item collection. Drawing inspiration from arcade shoot 'em ups, war films (such as The Guns of Navarone), and maze games (such as maze-shooter Berzerk), it laid groundwork for both stealth and action-adventure games. shoot 'em ups .

According to Wizardry developer Roe R. Adams, early action-adventure games "were basically arcade games done in a fantasy" setting. Tutankham, debuted by Konami in January 1982, was an action-adventure released for arcades. It combined maze, shoot 'em up, puzzle-solving and adventure elements, with a 1983 review by Computer and Video Games magazine calling it "the first game that effectively combined the elements of an adventure game with frenetic shoot 'em up gameplay". It inspired the similar Time Bandit (1983). Action Quest, released in May 1982, blended puzzle elements of adventure games into a joystick-controlled, arcade-style action game, which surprised reviewers at the time.

=== Mid-to-late 1980s: The hybrid genre takes shape ===
According to 1UP's Jeremy Parish, action-adventure games emerged in the mid-1980s as developers sought to combine arcade-style gameplay with exploration and puzzle-solving elements drawn from text adventures and RPGs. While noting some similarities to Adventure, IGN argues that The Legend of Zelda (1986) by Nintendo "helped to establish a new subgenre of action-adventure". The series featured real-time combat (a swingable sword rather than collision-based attacks), open-ended exploration, item-gated progression, and a persistent world via battery-backed saves. The Legend of Zelda series was the most prolific action-adventure game franchise through to the 2000s. Roe R. Adams also cited the arcade-style side-scrolling fantasy games Castlevania (1986), Trojan (1986) and Wizards & Warriors (1987) as early examples of action-adventure games.

Games like Brain Breaker (1985), Xanadu (1985), Metroid (1986) and Vampire Killer (1986) further established the side-scrolling "platform-adventure" format. These games allowed players to explore large, interconnected spaces, collecting upgrades to access previously unreachable areas. Over time, this would evolve into the "Metroidvania" subgenre. Other mid-’80s games, such as Wizards & Warriors (1987), Castlevania (1986), and Trojan (1986), added fantasy themes and action-platformer mechanics to the formula. Meanwhile, games like 005 (1981), and Metal Gear (1987) combined action-adventure exploration with stealth mechanics, laying the foundations for the stealth game subgenre, which would later be popularized in 1998 with the releases of Metal Gear Solid, Tenchu: Stealth Assassins, and Thief: The Dark Project.

The release of cinematic platformer Prince of Persia (1989) by Jordan Mechner marked a major evolution in the genre's visual and mechanical identity. The game introduced rotoscoped animation, realistic movement, and a cinematic presentation. Its blend of puzzle-platforming and deadly traps would go on to inspire numerous "cinematic platformers". It inspired games such as Another World (1991) and Flashback (1992). Another World / Out of This World (1991) pushed visual storytelling and minimal UI even further, inspiring later cinematic adventures and platformers. Alone in the Dark (1992) introduced pre-rendered 3D environments with polygonal characters and fixed camera angles. Often cited as a proto-survival horror, it nonetheless stands within the action-adventure tradition for its combination of real-time combat, puzzle-solving, and exploration which would later be popularized by Resident Evil (1996) and Tomb Raider (1996).

=== 1990s: Genre branching and 3D milestones ===
The early 1990s saw diversification in the genre. The Amazing Spider-Man 2 (1992) was the first action adventure superhero game developed by Bits Studios and published by Acclaim Entertainment and released in 1992. Super Metroid (1994) refined the Metroidvania formula, emphasizing ability-based gating, readable environments, and seamless world design. On PC, Little Big Adventure (1994) and Fade to Black (1995) experimented with 3D movement and camera systems, albeit with mixed critical results. Resident Evil in particular created the survival horror subgenre, inspiring titles such as Silent Hill (1999) and Fatal Frame (2001). The late ’90s brought 3D camera, lock-on, and context-sensitive actions into focus. The Legend of Zelda: Ocarina of Time (1998) set a new standard for 3D action-adventure games. Its Z-targeting system solved the issue of 3D combat clarity, while context-sensitive interactions and an expansive world made it a template for third-person adventure games. 1998 also saw the release of Metal Gear Solid and Thief: The Dark Project. Metal Gear Solid (1998) popularized cinematic stealth systems, while Thief: The Dark Project (1998) defined the first-person immersive-stealth approach that inspired many later games.

=== 2000s: Parkour, gadgets and set-pieces ===
The decade began with Grand Theft Auto III (2001) which combined the action-adventure template into a modern open-world sandbox, allowing non-linear mission structures and systemic interaction in an urban environment Prince of Persia: The Sands of Time (2003) reintroduced the series with parkour traversal and the rewind mechanic shaping later movement-centric action-adventures. Red Dead is a series of Western-themed action-adventure games published by Rockstar Games beginning with Red Dead Revolver (2004). Assassin's Creed (2007) blended social stealth, open-world exploration, and freerunning born from a Prince of Persia offshoot seeding a long-running stealth-action formula. Uncharted created by Naughty Dog, pushed the “cinematic” action-adventure (snappy traversal, set-pieces, character-driven storytelling). Batman: Arkham Asylum (2009) took a 3D, gadget-gated “Metroidvania-like” structure: returning to a hub island with new abilities opening shortcuts, an approach many third-person action-adventures later adopted. In the same year, Shadow Complex (2009) ignited a modern indie Metroidvania revival on digital storefronts.

=== 2010s: Open worlds and systemic play ===
The 2010s were defined by systemic world design and “prestige” storytelling. Telltale Games developed and published the first entry of The Walking Dead an episodic graphic adventure video game series in 2012. The Last of Us series by Naughty Dog set in a post-apocalyptic United States ravaged by cannibalistic humans infected by a mutated fungus debuted with its first entry in 2013. Wolfenstein, a previously first-person shooter franchise shifted towards the action adventure with Wolfenstein: The New Order (2014) after acquisition by Bethesda Softworks. The Legend of Zelda: Breath of the Wild (2017) reimagined the franchise around physics-based interactions, survival elements, and emergent play. Nintendo's developers explicitly cited the original 1986 Legend of Zelda as inspiration, now applied through modern systemic tools. God of War (2018) rebooted the franchise with an intimate, single-shot camera, semi-open world structure, and weighty, tactical combat. Critics and developers alike pointed to its seamless narrative integration as a genre milestone. Sony entertainment brought Spider-man games in house with the Marvel's Spider-Man series which began with Marvel's Spider-Man (2018). As of February 2024, this series sold more than 50 million copies, with Marvel's Spider-Man 2 having sold 10 million units. Death Stranding (2019) experimented with asynchronous co-op through a “social strand” system, where players indirectly aided each other by leaving behind infrastructure, items, and messages. Star Wars Jedi series of action adventure games based on the Star Wars setting debuted with Star Wars Jedi: Fallen Order (2019).

=== 2020s: Player-created solutions and global popularity ===
Action-adventure games have gone on to become more popular than the pure adventure games and pure platform games that inspired them. Sucker Punch's Ghost of Tsushima (2020) combined stealth-action, a Kurosawa-inspired aesthetic, and smart navigation tools (like the Guiding Wind) to refine open-world action-adventure design. The Legend of Zelda: Tears of the Kingdom (2023) extended the systemic design of Breath of the Wild with Ultrahand and Fuse, enabling open-ended traversal and combat through player-created contraptions. Developers explicitly stated their desire to support emergent gameplay through these tools.
