= Desperados: Wanted Dead or Alive =

2001 video game

- European cover art
- Developer: Spellbound Entertainment
- Publisher: Infogrames
- Director: Jean-Marc Haessig
- Producer: Armin Gessert
- Designer: Jean-Marc Haessig
- Programmer: Stéphane Becker
- Composers: Michael Anarp; Serge Mandon; Giovanni Vindigni
- Series: Desperados
- Platforms: Microsoft Windows; OS X; Linux
- Release: Windows: FRA: 18 April 2001; UK: 20 April 2001; NA: 24 July 2001; OS X: WW: 4 March 2015; Linux: WW: 5 July 2018
- Genre: Real-time tactics
- Mode: Single-player

Desperados: Wanted Dead or Alive is a real-time tactics video game developed by Spellbound Entertainment and published by Infogrames for Microsoft Windows.

In the game, the player controls up to six characters in an Old West setting. The protagonist is a worldly knife-fighter and gunslinger, John Cooper, who sets out to capture a notorious train-robber named "El Diablo" and claim the bounty on his head. As Cooper sets off on his quest, he is aided by five companions and they work together in a real-time, stealth-based structure, although all-out gunfights are still highly possible in the game.

The game is the first in the Desperados series, initially followed in 2006 by Desperados 2: Cooper's Revenge and in 2007 by a stand-alone expansion Helldorado. A multiplayer-oriented title that would have been called Desperados Gangs was in development when Spellbound shut down. The series was revived in 2020 with Desperados III developed by Mimimi Productions and published by THQ Nordic.

== Plot ==
In 1881, a bandit gang commits armed holdups of several trains. The railroad company Twinnings & Co puts up a reward of $15,000 for whoever brings those responsible in dead or alive. John Cooper, a traveling gunfighter, decides to pursue the bounty and gathers a team of his old acquaintances: explosives fanatic Sam Williams; Doc McCoy, a physician, sharpshooter and lockpicker; and gambler and con-woman Kate O'Hara.

After questioning cantankerous U.S. Marshal Jackson, the group apprehends bandit gang leader Pablo Sanchez, whom Jackson has implicated, but as they attempt to deliver him to the authorities, they run into (and thwart) an ambush set by another gang of bandits. This, and Sanchez's revelation that a masked outlaw known only as "El Diablo" is behind the robberies and has a snitch at Twinnings, convinces Cooper that Sanchez must be innocent.

Cooper deduces that Smith, Twinning's partner, is El Diablo's snitch, but Smith is assassinated before Cooper can get answers. With Jackson sending a posse to pursue the bounty hunters on charges of murder, Cooper frees Sanchez from prison and enlists his help. Sanchez guides the team to Socorro to track down Carlos, a local tavern owner and underling of El Diablo. Mia Yung, a young Chinese American girl, also joins the team after Jackson's deputies kill her father in his own waystation, vowing revenge.

While Cooper listens in on a conversation between Carlos and one of El Diablo's representatives (in which Carlos dies), Doc and Kate are taken hostage. Cooper, Sam, Mia, and Sanchez secretly follow El Diablo's gang as they use a hijacked train to deliver supplies to their boss's hideout in a remote cave. El Diablo captures the group in a trap and imprisons them while he offers Sanchez a chance to join his gang as an alternative to being tortured to death. The gang escapes with the help of Mia's pet monkey, Mr. Leone; Cooper rescues Sanchez and confronts El Diablo. To his shock, Diablo reveals that he is actually Marshal Jackson. After a gunfight, Cooper finishes Jackson off with his knife, and the latter falls out of his office's window to his death. Cooper then bids farewell to El Diablo, tossing a coin towards his final resting place for a "One way ticket to hell".

== Gameplay ==
The game is a top down stealth tactics game, similar to Commandos: Behind Enemy Lines. The player controls up to six characters to navigate through each level and deal with the enemies in a variety of ways, such as John's knife throwing, Sam's snake, Doc's knock out gas, etc etc.

The player can use a "spyglass" function on NPCs to see their fields of vision. Depending on the color of the cone, the player can see the mental state of the NPC. If the cone is green, it means the person is calm. Similarly, a yellow cone signifies suspicion, and a red means the NPC has spotted one of the characters. Some colors signify special status such as a pink cone, meaning the NPC has become attracted to Kate, or a black cone, meaning they have been hit by Mia's blowpipe.

Another special feature is the Quick Action, in which certain actions - from running to a certain place up to using a weapon against a pre-targeted enemy - can be 'pre-programmed' and called upon immediately when needed. For instance, by programming his revolver with Quick Action, Cooper can either concentrate all three shots that he can fire on a single opponent or divide them between up to three targets without having to move the mouse cursor around.

== Development ==
Physical copies of the game released in the United States featured an alternate cover art by famed comic book artist Glenn Fabry.

An add-on was announced, but it was never released.

A modernised update, Desperados: Wanted Dead or Alive - Modernized, released in July 2018 improved compatibility with newer Windows 10 OS, as well as ports to MacOS and Linux, added foreign dubs that were previously missing from most digital versions, and its mission from the game's demo brought into the full game.

== Reception ==
Reception

Aggregate score
Aggregator	Score
Metacritic	78/100

Review scores
Publication	Score
Computer Games Magazine	3.5/5
Computer Gaming World	4/5
Edge	5/10
Game Informer	7.25/10
GameSpot	6.8/10
GameSpy	83%
GameZone	8/10
IGN	8.1/10
Next Generation	4/5
PC Gamer (US)	81%

Rob Smolka reviewed the PC version of the game for Next Generation, rating it four stars out of five, and stated that "this gets an extra star just for being that rare Western-themes game that does justice to its source. Stick with it through the tough times, or you'll miss out on a great story and a stable full of action".

The game received "generally favorable reviews" according to the review aggregation website Metacritic.
