= Robin Hood: The Legend of Sherwood =

2002 video game

- Developer: Spellbound Entertainment
- Publishers: Strategy First; Mindscape; Freeverse Inc. Wanadoo Edition; Meridian4
- Platforms: Microsoft Windows, Mac OS X, Linux (PowerPC/x86), MorphOS
- Release: Windows: UK: November 12, 2002; WW: November 15, 2002; OS X 2005; Linux; November 1, 2012
- Genres: Real-time tactics, stealth
- Mode: Single-player

Robin Hood: The Legend of Sherwood is a 2002 stealth-based real-time tactics video game developed by Spellbound Entertainment. It is similar to games such as Desperados: Wanted Dead or Alive and the Commandos series. In the game, the player controls up to five characters in a setting based on the stories of the protagonist, Robin Hood. The player can also control Robin Hood's Merry Men, including Little John, Friar Tuck, Will Scarlet, Will Stutely, and Maid Marian. Robin and his crew must evade the cruel Sheriff of Nottingham and his henchmen and stop the machinations of the vile usurper to England's throne, Prince John. Robin must avoid killing enemies as much as possible, or he will not be able to recruit as many new Merry Men.

== Plot ==
The game starts with Robin Hood, arriving in Lincoln from the Crusades, and finding out that his inheritance has been stolen by the notorious Sheriff of Nottingham. After the player finishes the first and second missions, meets Maid Marian in the Nottingham cathedral, and subsequently tries to meet the Prince, it is understood that King Richard has been kidnapped by Leopold of Austria for a ransom, and that the Regent Prince John is unlawfully usurping the rightful king. The responsibility of getting the ransom of £100,000 to save the king falls into the player's hands. Missions generally include ambushing convoys and infiltrating towns, usually to gather information or even liberate a notable outlaw from the sheriff's clutches. In the final mission, Robin must fight the Sheriff of Nottingham, thereby defeating the Prince.

== Gameplay ==
While the merry men can kill or wound enemy soldiers, their resources are limited to a certain extent, with main characters having more than minor miscellaneous ones. In addition, in every town, the player can give money to beggars, who, when given coins and purses, help by providing hints and tips. Common folk sometimes, though rarely, offer help but two—a woman in a red apron and a man in a red-and-blue shirt—flee at the sight of a merry man and alert nearby enemy soldiers. The greed of enemy soldiers is also limited, with money purses not affecting sergeants, while ale does affect them. Sometimes, money can be found in knights, cavalry units, sergeants, and more rarely, normal soldiers.

== Reception ==
Reception

Aggregate score
Aggregator	Score
Metacritic	80/100

Review scores
Publication	Score
Computer Games Magazine	3/5
Computer Gaming World	4/5
GamesMaster	74%
GameSpot	8.6/10
GameSpy	4/5
GameZone	8.5/10
IGN	8.2/10
Jeuxvideo.com	12/20
PC Gamer (US)	71%
PC Zone	71%

The PC version received "favorable" reviews according to the review aggregation website Metacritic. The Linux version of the game, which was available in German and English, also received favourable mentions.

=== Awards ===
The game received awards for Best Game Design and Best Animation at the 2003 Animago Awards.
