= Beyond Castle Wolfenstein =

1984 video game

- Developer: Muse Software
- Publisher: Muse Software
- Designers: Eric Ace; Frank Svoboda III; Silas S. Warner
- Series: Wolfenstein
- Platforms: Apple II, Atari 8-bit, Commodore 64, MS-DOS
- Release: NA: July 1984
- Genres: Action-adventure, stealth
- Mode: Single-player

Beyond Castle Wolfenstein is a 1984 action-adventure game developed and published by Muse Software. A direct sequel to Castle Wolfenstein, it is the second game in the Wolfenstein series. Castle Wolfenstein was written solely by Silas Warner for the Apple II, while the sequel was developed simultaneously for the Apple II and Commodore 64 by Warner, Eric Ace, and Frank Svoboda III. It was quickly ported to the Atari 8-bit computers and MS-DOS.

== Gameplay ==
Like its predecessor, Beyond Castle Wolfenstein is a combination action and adventure game with stealth elements set in Nazi Germany during World War II. The objective is to traverse the levels of the secret Berlin bunker where Adolf Hitler is holding meetings with his senior staff. The player must retrieve a bomb that operatives have hidden inside the bunker, place it outside the room where Hitler is holding a meeting, and escape before the bomb explodes.

IBM PC screenshot of Beyond Castle Wolfenstein showing the player about to place the bomb in the meeting room, the numbers denoting the bomb's countdown timer and the passes the player possesses

The game shows a top-down view of each room, though the characters are from a side view. The player explores the levels by sneaking by, impersonating, and sometimes killing opponents. The game is controlled via a joystick, paddles, or the keyboard, although the keyboard is the only option that allows for all commands.

The play is similar to its predecessor, but with some updates. The guards use a pass system, in which the player is periodically summoned by guards and asked to show the correct pass (which varies by floor), or offer a bribe. If an incorrect pass is shown or the bribe is rejected due to the lack of money (for a total of two times), the guard will attempt to activate a bunker-wide alarm or kill the player. The bodies of dead guards can be dragged through the room to conceal them, block passages, or gain access to objects. The grenades of the previous game have been replaced with a dagger which can silently kill guards. Upon successful completion of the game, the player is rewarded with a high resolution image of the bunker exploding with the player running away in the foreground.

== Reception ==
Harvey Berstein of Antic wrote in 1985 of the Atari 8-bit version: "while there have been some minor improvements, the game play doesn't provide nearly as much depth as the documentation suggests." He criticized the game for having the same Apple II-like graphics as its predecessor and slow loading speed. He also pointed out, "Once you know which passes to use, you can breeze through the game", discouraging replay.

In January 1985, Computer Entertainer rated the Atari 8-bit version 5½ out of 8 stars.

A 1991 Computer Gaming World survey of strategy and war games gave it two stars out of five.
