= The Last Tinker: City of Colors =

2014 action-adventure-platform video game

- Developer: Mimimi Productions
- Publishers: Unity Games (PC); Loot Entertainment (PS4); Soedesco (Retail version); Daedalic Entertainment (PC)
- Director: Dominik Abé
- Producer: Johannes Roth
- Designers: Martin Hamberger; Mortiz Wagner
- Programmers: Dominik Abé; Johannes Roth; Maximilian Auer
- Artists: Bianca Dörr; Cem Erdalan; Lucas Reiner; Florian Smolka
- Writers: Dominik Abé; Martin Hamberger; Dennis Huszak; Johannes Roth; Mortiz Wagner
- Composer: Filippo Beck Peccoz
- Engine: Unity
- Platforms: Microsoft Windows; OS X; Linux; PlayStation 4
- Release: 12 May 2014: Windows, macOS, Linux; 12 May 2014; PlayStation 4; NA: 19 August 2014; EU: 20 August 2014
- Genre: Action-adventure
- Mode: Single-player

The Last Tinker: City of Colors is a 2014 German action-adventure-platform video game developed by Mimimi Productions. It was published by for Microsoft Windows, OS X and Linux on 12 May 2014. A PlayStation 4 version was handled by Loot Interactive, and released digitally on the PlayStation Store on August 19, 2014, in North America and August 20, 2014, in Europe and Australia. A retail version published by Dutch publisher Soedesco was released in May 2015 in Europe and in March 2016 in North America.

The player controls a young anthropomorphic monkey named Koru as he rises, using color and emotion, from his home in the slums of Colortown to stand against the "Bleakness", a force trying to wipe out all joy and life from the world. An Xbox One port of the game was planned, but was cancelled due to poor sales on the PlayStation 4 version.

== Gameplay ==
The Last Tinker: City of Colors is inspired by classic platform game series like Jak and Daxter or Banjo-Kazooie while breaking the format by not having a jump button. The game is described as "a vivid journey through Colortown, a world built upon creativity, emotion and collaboration".

== Reception ==
The Last Tinker: City of Colors received mixed reviews and the Deutscher Computerspielpreis 2015 for best game design. Aggregating review websites GameRankings and Metacritic gave the Windows version 75.63% based on 27 reviews and 72/100 based on 41 reviews and the PlayStation 4 version 67.25% based on 20 reviews and 66/100 based on 19 reviews.

In a positive review, Matt Beaudette of Hardcore Gamer rated the game a 4/5, calling it "a hard game to hate" and said the "beautiful visuals, brilliantly realized art style, and enjoyable music will put a smile on even the most cynical faces."

In a negative review, David Roberts of GamesRadar+ rated the game 2 and a half stars out of 5, saying the game "just bleeds together into a formless mass of cartoon characters and mediocre action."
