= ABM (video game) =

1980 video game

- Publisher: Muse Software
- Programmer: Silas Warner
- Platform: Apple II
- Release: 1980
- Genre: Shoot 'em up

ABM (standing for Anti-Ballistic Missile) is a clone of Atari, Inc.'s Missile Command arcade video game. It was programmed for the Apple II by Silas Warner and published by Muse Software in 1980, the same year as Missile Command.

== Gameplay ==
In ABM, the player uses anti-ballistic missiles to defend six cities along the East Coast against incoming ICBMs.

== Reception ==
Bruce Webster reviewed ABM in The Space Gamer No. 43. Webster wrote that "In the end, the question is whether or not you want to spend the money for another arcade game. If so, then I can recommend ABM to you with the above caveats."
