= Firebug (video game) =

1982 video game

- Developer: Muse Software
- Publisher: Muse Software
- Designer: Silas Warner
- Platform: Apple II
- Release: NA: 1982
- Mode: Single-player

Firebug is an Apple II maze video game written by Silas Warner and published by Muse Software in 1982. The game was released on cassette tape and on floppy disk. Warner previously created Castle Wolfenstein for the Apple II in 1981. As a pyromaniac, the player carries and ignites cans of gasoline in an attempt to burn as much of the level as possible.

Firebug uses the Apple II's lo-res graphics mode, which displays 16 colors but has a resolution of only 40 wide by 48 high. The game looks more colorful than hi-res Apple games, but the low resolution gives a crude appearance, even by the standards at the time of release. The game was originally released as Firefly.

== Gameplay ==

The player controls a "firebug," a 3-by-3-pixel square with a tail stretching behind it. The player picks up gas cans—each represented by a single pixel—and drops a can by pressing the joystick button. The end of the player's tail glows white, and ignites any gas can that it is adjacent to, including cans the player had dropped. Once a gas can ignites, it burst into colorful flames, which ignites any walls they touch.

The goal is to burn down the highest possible percentage of the walls on the level, and escape down the stairs to the next level without touching any flames with the body of the firebug. Tail collisions with fire are expected and ignored. As the game progresses, each level features tighter mazes of walls, increasing the penalty for player mistakes; and the player's tail is shortened, causing player-dropped gas cans to explode sooner.

== Reception ==
Johnny L. Wilson reviewed the game for Computer Gaming World, and stated that "Firebug seems to have the ingredients necessary for a successful arcade game: interesting graphics, sufficient challenge, moderate strategy, and ample flexibility. Indeed, "ash" far "ash" this reviewer is able to "ash-certain," this game is an "ash-set" to an "ash-tute" arcade lovers "ash-sortment" of games. Unab-ash-edly."

In Microcomputing, Jim Hansen wrote "Neither I nor my kid-game testers found Firebug a game worth playing more than once or twice at most."

In 1982, the city council of Kentwood, Michigan asked dealers not to sell the game because they felt it encouraged arson.
