= Desperados 2: Cooper's Revenge =

2006 video game

- Developer: Spellbound Entertainment
- Publisher: Atari
- Director: Jean-Marc Haessig
- Designer: Matthias Nock
- Programmers: Arno Wienholtz; Mark Novozhilov
- Artist: Serge Mandon
- Writers: Hans-Jörg Knabel; Jean-Marc Haessig
- Series: Desperados
- Platform: Microsoft Windows
- Release: GER: 27 April 2006; UK: 28 April 2006; NA: 8 May 2006; AU: 12 May 2006
- Genre: Real-time tactics
- Mode: Single-player

Desperados 2: Cooper's Revenge is a real-time tactics video game developed by Spellbound Entertainment and published by Atari exclusively for Microsoft Windows. It is the sequel to Desperados: Wanted Dead or Alive. The game was followed by a spin-off/sequel Helldorado in 2007 for Windows, and a successor, Desperados III, released for Windows, PlayStation 4 and Xbox One in 2020 by THQ Nordic.

== Plot ==
US Marshal Ross Cooper, John Cooper's brother, has been tortured to death by the henchmen of a criminal known as Angel Face, and John vows to avenge him. In order to investigate the mysterious Angel Face, John sends Doc McCoy to the Eagle's Nest, Pablo Sanchez's fortress, to gather him and Sam Williams.

When Doc arrives, the fortress had been forcibly taken over by Rodriguez, Sanchez's rival bandit leader, and his friends were captured. After freeing the two, they reunite with John and Kate O'Hara in Santa Fe, where John has agreed to protect some settlers on their journey.

At a pass known as Eye of the Needle, they find a blockade of logs set up by hostile Native Americans. After they manage to survive the ambush, a troop of US cavalry under Captain Clarke appears and takes an unconscious Indian prisoner. Suspicious of Clarke, John, Doc, and Kate follow the soldiers to a campsite, where they eavesdrop on them. Thereby, they learn that Angel Face has bribed Clarke and most of his men to orchestrate the Indian attack on the settlers, which will trigger a conflict between the US Government and the Native tribes. Kate follows Clarke as he transports the captive Indian to his base at Fort Wingate. As John and Doc keep listening, they learn that the soldiers are about to attack the settlers again to silence all witnesses. They return just in time to join forces with Sam and Sanchez and successfully repel the raid.

At Fort Wingate, Kate enters the restricted area to find Hawkeye, the Indian prisoner, and see if he knows anything about Angel Face, but he's too weak after being severely beaten. When the others arrive, Doc sneaks into the prison and patches Hawkeye up. Hawkeye informs the group of a letter sent to Clarke. The group, with Hawkeye as a new member, breaks into Clarke's office to steal the letter. Using a piece of charcoal, John uncovers a signature imprinted on the letter, with the name Lester Lloyd Goodman (a.k.a. Angel Face). As they present the damning evidence to the fort's commanding colonel, they capture Clarke on the spot, but his loyal sergeant stages a revolt among the corrupted soldiers. John and his team intervene on the cavalry's behalf and manage to liberate the fort.

Having discovered Angel Face's true identity, the group returns to Santa Fe, where they kidnap Goodman's secretaries in order to find proof of his crimes in his accounting book. They coerce Morgenstein, one of the secretaries, to co-operate. But when John, Kate, and Sam present the evidence to the sheriff, he reveals that the old sheriff was murdered, and he's in cahoots with Goodman. After seeing the sheriff arrest his friends, Hawkeye sneaks through the city to alerts Doc and Sanchez. They free their friends from prison and recapture Morgenstein. Since Morgenstein has sealed the incriminating documents in the city bank, the group enlists the bank manager to open the safe, but they are intercepted by Goodman himself just as they claim the documents. He flees with the evidence to the Sacred Mountains, the site of his latest railway construction project, taking Kate with him. John and his team fight their way to the Santa Fe railway station, where John boards a train bound for the same destination. But the train derails upon arrival, and he gets captured.

Hawkeye and Doc arrive at Hawkeye's camp near the Sacred Mountain to convince the tribe to join the fight against Goodman, but Goodman's men have occupied the camp. The two kill the invaders to liberate the tribe and meet up with Sam and Sanchez, who have also infiltrated Goodman's camp. With the aid of the Indians, the four overrun Goodman's henchmen and save Cooper from being hung. The group pursues Goodman to a tunnel construction site, where he holes up with Kate as his hostage. They overpower Goodman's last men and escape before Goodman's lit cigar ignites some explosives and blows up the building, killing him.

In the end, John stands by his brother's grave with Kate, and they share a kiss. Later, a mysterious figure sneaks into Doc's apartment and poisons him, setting the stage for Helldorado.

== Development and release ==
Andreas Speer, one of the heads of Spellbound, said the publisher, Atari, missed six months worth of payment which forced Spellbound to lay off staff and release the game not as planned and promoted. A sequel, Helldorado, was made with the scrapped part of the game, but Spellbound could not gain the rights to the Desperados name. The game was released in 2006 in France on 21 April, in Germany on 27 April, in the United Kingdom on 28 April, in North America on 8 May, and in Australia on 12 May.

== Critical reception ==
Reception

Aggregate score
| Aggregator | Score |
|---|---|
| Metacritic | 66/100 |

Review scores
| Publication | Score |
|---|---|
| Edge | 4/10 |
| Eurogamer | 7/10 |
| GamesMaster | 80% |
| GameSpot | 6.1/10 |
| IGN | 7.1/10 |
| Jeuxvideo.com | 13/20 |
| PC Format | 61% |
| PC Gamer (UK) | 76% |
| PC Zone | 67% |
| X-Play | 2/5 |
| The Sydney Morning Herald | 2.5/5 |

The game received "average" reviews according to the review aggregation website Metacritic. Graphical quality was praised but many did not like the story and the buggy features of the game.
