= Chicago 1930 =

2003 video game

- North America box art
- Developer(s): Spellbound Entertainment
- Publisher(s): Wanadoo Edition (Europe); MC2-Microids (North America)
- Platform(s): Windows, Mac OS X
- Release: November 2003
- Genre(s): Action, role-playing
- Mode(s): Single-player

Chicago 1930 (also known as Chicago 1930: The Prohibition) is a 2003 video game developed by Spellbound Entertainment.

The game is based in the American city of Chicago in the 1930s, an era heavily associated with gangsters. The RPG style game allows players to choose to be the mafia, headed by Don Carmine Falcone, or a special unit of the police, headed by Edward Nash.

== Gameplay ==
Players can choose their side: either lead a mafia team or a special police unit, each consisting of five specialized characters. The game features RPG elements, including various character skills such as shooting, melee combat, and charisma. During battles, players can use slow-motion mode and realistic AI-driven opponents to achieve their objectives.

== Plot ==
The game is set in a conflict between the mafia and a special police task force in Chicago.
