= Three Mile Island (video game) =

1979 video game

- Publisher: Muse Software
- Programmer: Richard Orban
- Platform: Apple II
- Release: 1979; 1980: Special Edition
- Genre: Simulation

Three Mile Island is an Apple II game written by Richard Orban and published by Muse Software in 1979. Three Mile Island: Special Edition is a 1980 update that is written in 6502 assembly language instead of Integer BASIC.

== Background ==
The game gets its name from the Three Mile Island accident, which occurred the same year as its release. The date the game is set is December 30, 1978 - which was also the day Unit 2 of the Three Mile Island Nuclear Generating Station went into commercial operation.

== Contents ==
Three Mile Island is a simulation game set in a nuclear power plant with an impending nuclear meltdown.

== Reception ==
Bruce F. Webster reviewed Three Mile Island in The Space Gamer No. 34. Webster commented that "Three Mile Island is not a cheap piece of software, in any sense of the term. But for those of you with the interest and the money, I can recommend it to you without reservations."

== See also ==
- Scram, a 1981 video game with a similar premise
