= Night Light Interactive =

Night Light Interactive, LLC
- Type: Private
- Industry: Video games
- Founded: 2012; 14 years ago
- Founders: David Logan; Michael Bellavia
- Headquarters: Los Angeles, California, U.S.
- Key people: David Logan; Leif Dahl
- Products: Whispering Willows
- Website: nightlightinteractive.com

Night Light Interactive, LLC is an American video game company founded in 2012 and based in Los Angeles, California that has developed the video game Whispering Willows.

== History ==
Night Light Interactive was co-founded by David Logan and Michael Bellavia in 2012. The studio's first game, Whispering Willows, was entered in the 2013 OUYA Create Game Jam, where it won "Most Immersive" and first received major attention. The success led to the company creating a successful Kickstarter and getting the game released on Steam through Steam Greenlight. Night Light Interactive was converted into the Limited Liability Corporation 'Night Light Interactive, LLC' on April 12, 2012. then received funding from OUYA's "Free the Game Fund."

In 2014 Night Light brought on two official advisers, Kellee Santiago, formerly of Thatgamecompany and Terry Redfield, of Wicked Fun. In 2015 Leif Dahl became a company partner through working on Whispering Willows.

Their next game, Nomad has been teased on their website.

== Whispering Willows ==
Whispering Willows is a horror-themed adventure game. Assuming the role of Elena Elkhorn, a child looking for her missing father, the player progresses by using astral projection to communicate with spirits and explore the environment. The game won multiple awards including "Best Story" at Casual Connect Indie Prize; First Place at Seattle Indie Gaming Competition; Winner 2013 for “Most Immersive,” Finalist for “Grand Prize” and “Best Visuals” at OUYA CREATE Game Jam; Finalist in Captivate Conference Game Design Competition 2013, and Winner of the Cerebral Indie Developer Grant in 2013. The game has also been ported to PlayStation, Xbox, Wii, iOS and Android.
