= JumpJet Rex =

2015 video game

- Developer: TreeFortress Games
- Publishers: TreeFortress Games; Loot Interactive (PS4, XBO)
- Designer: Shawn Blais
- Platforms: Linux; OS X; PlayStation 4; Windows; Xbox One
- Release: Linux, OS X, Windows; April 22, 2015; Xbox One; April 29, 2016; PlayStation 4; June 28, 2017
- Genre: Platformer

JumpJet Rex is a 2D platform game developed and published by TreeFortress Games. The game was released for Windows, OS X and Linux in April 2015. An Xbox One version was later released in April 2016 with a PlayStation 4 release following in June 2017.

== Gameplay ==
JumpJet Rex is a 2D platform game, in which players control the eponymous character, a space-exploring tyrannosaurus equipped with jet-propelled boots. Rex's jet boots give him the ability to hover, dash and boost.

== Development and release ==
Developed by TreeFortress Games, JumpJet Rex original began as a project for a game jam in 2014. The game takes inspiration from classic platform titles of the 8-bit and 16-bit eras, such as Mega Man and Sonic the Hedgehog.

An in-development version of the game was released commercially through Steam Early Access for Linux, OS X, and Windows on January 14, 2015. The early access release featured the first dozen levels of the game. The game exited the early access phase and received an official release for PC platforms on April 22, 2015. The game was later released on the Xbox One video game console on April 29, 2016.

== Reception ==
JumpJet Rex received a "generally favourable" reception from critics, with aggregate review website Metacritic assigning a score of 76 out of 100 based on 11 reviews.
