= Titan Empire =

1983 video game

- Developer: Muse Software
- Publisher: Muse Software
- Platform: Apple II
- Release: 1983
- Genre: Strategy
- Mode: Single-player

Titan Empire is a strategy video game for the Apple II published by Muse Software in 1983

== Gameplay ==
The player controls a ship resembling the Starship Enterprise. A militant government originating from a settlement on Saturn's moon Titan have started attacking neighboring moons and planets and taking over their government. It is the player's objective to stop the spread of the faction and free planets conquered by them. The player does this by bombing enemy planets and attacking enemy ships.

== Reception ==
Computer Gaming World described Titan Empire as an "overall playable, but sometimes frustrating game".
