= Overworld =

Multilevel area in video game design

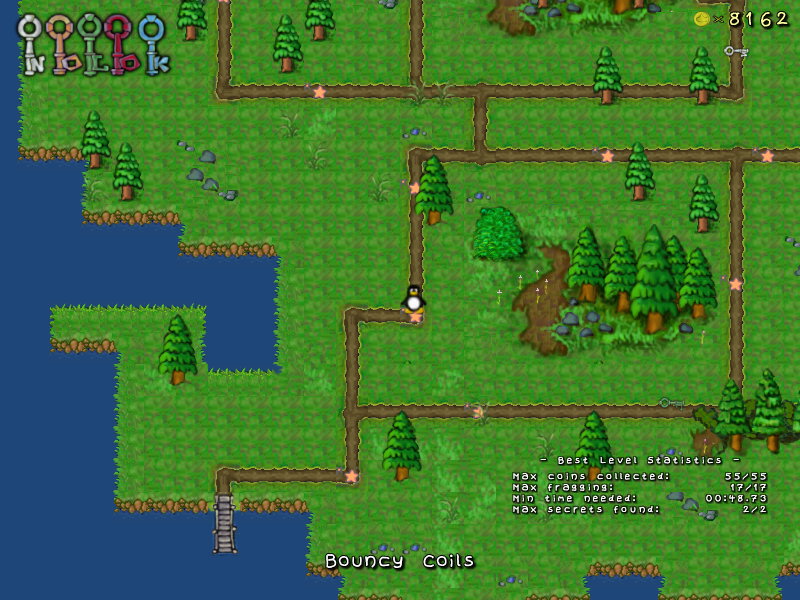
An example of an overworld in the platformer SuperTux (2004)

An overworld or a hub world is, in a broad sense, an area within a video game that interconnects all its levels or locations. They are mostly common in role-playing games, though this does not exclude other video game genres, such as some platformers and strategy games.

== Description ==
An overworld or hub world is an area within a video game which connects its other levels or locations. The term can also refer to a safer area which players frequently return to, like a town. They are common in adventure games, role-playing games (RPGs), platformers, and dungeon crawlers. Multiplayer games have hub worlds which serve as a centre for interaction with other players and non-player characters (NPCs).

Hub worlds in single-player games are often used for worldbuilding, while hubs in multiplayer games are more purposed for storage for weapons and equipment, as well as restocking supplies. They serve as safe areas in between dangerous areas and quests where players can take on more passive actions. Wired and Kotaku described overworlds as a sort of "home" for the player in-game. They have also been considered an essential element of RPGs.

== History ==
The 1981 arcade games Route-16 and 005 were among the earliest examples of a hub world. In Route-16, a driving maze game, exiting a maze takes the player to a large overworld map showing the locations of the player, cars, mazes and treasures. In 005, an early stealth game, players could enter buildings like ice rinks and warehouses from the main screen to avoid enemies, leading to different screens. The final scene tasks the players with controlling their getaway helicopter to escape and finish the level. Dubbed "a game in four screens", 005 was then described as a "RasterScan Convert-a-Game" according to The Encyclopedia of Arcade Games.

In Super Mario 64 (1996), Princess Peach's Castle serves as its hub world. Free of enemies (apart from the courtyard's Boos), the castle serves as a safe area where players can experiment with its movement system and serves as an entrance to all other levels. Players are free to leave the castle whenever they wish.

== Audio design ==
In terms of video game music, overworld themes are often orchestral in nature, and of greater length and complexity than other pieces in the same game, due to the amount of time spent travelling the overworld map. Because players will usually visit a single level or area a few times in a given play session, the music for any such section of the game will typically be shorter and/or less complex, and thus less time-consuming for the designers to produce. The overworld theme frequently functions as the main theme of a game, often used as a motif for other tracks (e.g., a "romance" theme features the main melody of the overworld theme, orchestrated in a different key).

== See also ==
- Level design
- Open world
