= Spellbound Entertainment =

Former German video game developer

Spellbound Entertainment AG
- Type: Public
- Industry: Video games
- Founded: 1994; 32 years ago
- Defunct: 2012; 14 years ago
- Fate: Administration
- Successor: Black Forest Games
- Headquarters: Offenburg, Germany
- Products: Desperados series
- Number of employees: 65 (2012)

Spellbound Entertainment AG was a German video game developer based in Offenburg. The company is best known for the Desperados series.

They also developed Arcania: Gothic 4 (part of the Gothic series) and later its expansion, Arcania: Fall of Setarrif. It was Spellbound's first entry into the series, which was previously developed by Piranha Bytes.

== History ==
Spellbound was founded in 1994 by Armin Gessert. They created video games for Windows computers, and other gaming systems.

In 2012 the company went into administration and closed. On 13 July 2012, the studio re-opened as Black Forest Games, employing 40 of the former 65 staff members.

=== Games developed ===
- Perry Rhodan: Operation Eastside (1995; Fantasy Productions)
- Desperados: Wanted Dead or Alive (2001; Infogrames)
- Untitled Desperados addon (unreleased)
- Robin Hood: The Legend of Sherwood (2002; Mindscape, Free verse, Wanadoo Edition)
- Airline Tycoon (1998–2003; Infogrames, Monte Cristo, RuneSoft)
- Smoking Colts (2003; Spellbound Entertainment)
- Chicago 1930 (2003; Wanadoo Edition)
- Desperados 2: Cooper's Revenge (2006; Atari)
- Helldorado (2007; Viva Media)
- Giana Sisters DS (2009; Destineer, DTP Entertainment)
- Arcania: Gothic 4 (2010; JoWooD Entertainment, DreamCatcher Interactive)
- Arcania: Fall of Setarrif (2011; Nordic Games)
- Desperados Gangs (cancelled)
