= Loot Interactive =

American video game developer

Loot Interactive, LLC
- Company type: Private
- Industry: Video games
- Founded: 2009; 17 years ago
- Headquarters: Culver City, California, U.S.
- Key people: David Sterling (CEO)
- Website: lootinteractive.com

Loot Interactive, LLC is a group of developers best known for creating experiences and products for PlayStation Home. Previously part of Sony Pictures and later Sony DADC New Media Solutions, Loot has been an independent company since 2015.

Before Home's closure in March 2015, their products included premium personal spaces and different ornaments and costumes for the users' personal spaces and avatars. Their most significant contribution for Home was giving users tools to make machinimas. In 2012, Loot released their first standalone game, Forsaken Planet for Microsoft Windows. They have also released four games for Android and iOS. Since 2014, Loot Interactive has released ports of games for PlayStation 3, PlayStation 4, and PlayStation Vita, such as The Last Tinker: City of Colors (2014), Q*bert Rebooted (2015), and Whispering Willows (2015).

== PlayStation Home products ==
=== Stage Sets ===
Stage Sets were premium personal spaces where users, if they had a video capture system, could make their own machinimas in Home. The Stage Sets were available from the Home Estates store in Home's shopping complex.

The first Stage Set, the Living Room Stage Set from Loot, was made available on May 7, 2009. With the space included interactive lights, cameras, backdrops and film-related equipment to simulate a real-life studio production environment. The lighting and camera systems allowed for a wide range of desired angles, movements, transitions, and cuts and lens set-ups that allowed users to take control of the technical and artistic aspects.

The second Stage Set to be released from Loot in joint with Atari and Terminal Reality was the Ghostbusters Firehouse (originally named the Ghostbusters Firehouse: On Location). This space was dedicated to the 25th anniversary of Ghostbusters and its worldwide release on Blu-ray on June 18, 2009. The Firehouse personal space was a detailed replica of the three floor Ghostbusters headquarters from the original film.

The third Stage Set to be released from Loot was the Modular Stage Set 3. This Stage Set let users control over three enormous retractable backdrops, which could be set to different chroma key colors with motion track markers. The stage light system offered two additional flood lights for defining the right mood of each take and the floor could also be set to different materials and colors. This Stage Set was available in the "Ultimate Machinima" bundle (along with the "Talk Show" bundle – a collection of props that allowed users to dress their personal space like a talk show) as well as separate. This Stage Set was released on November 25, 2010, in both Europe and North America.

The fourth Stage Set to be released from Loot was the LOOT Studio Stage Set. This Stage Set was modeled after actual Sony Pictures Entertainment professional sound stages located on the Sony Pictures Lot in Culver City, California. The Studio Stage Set cameras could record video and audio to the PS3 hard drive or upload directly to YouTube. Together with PlayStation Home's customizable avatars, clothing, furniture items and environments, users could create a variety of machinimas. This Stage Set was released on June 27, 2012, in North America.

=== Personal spaces ===
In addition to the "Stage Sets", Loot released three other Personal Spaces for users to purchase. These included the "Sunset Yacht", the "Hollywood Hills House", and the "Space Apartment". Each one of these Personal Spaces included an "Entertainment On Demand" (EOD) screen that featured a variety of content from Loot. Users could also watch a variety of movies for free with their friends on all EOD screens thanks to Crackle. In addition to the standard features of PlayStation Home's Personal Spaces, Loot's "Space Apartment" also allowed users to view up to five Twitter feeds from a ticker, search for photos from their Flickr account and display them on the fifteen photo screens available (as well as setting up a slideshow for each screen), eight EOD screens, and they could control their Space Apartment's retractable ceiling, automated blinds, and dynamic lighting options.

=== Other products ===
In addition to the personal spaces, Loot released one public space, the "Loot Space Station", which was a public space devoted to videos and special events. The Loot Space Station also featured an EOD Theater that had access to all of the EOD content from Loot as well as Crackle. The Loot Space Station was released on April 7, 2011.

Other products from Loot included decorative ornaments for users personal spaces and clothes and costumes for users avatars, and products to help users make their own machinimas, such as the Live Active Camera that could be placed in any Personal Space to record videos.

On May 28, 2009, Loot released two Ghostbusters Fan Packs and a Ghostbusters costume for users avatars which could be purchased in the Threads store in the shopping complex. The first Fan Pack, called the Ghostbusters Fan Pack: Shirts, included one Ghostbusters themed hat and five Ghostbusters themed T-shirts for the users avatars. The second Fan Pack, called the Ghostbusters Fan Pack: Ornaments, included five Ghostbuster themed ornaments for the users personal spaces and three Ghostbuster themed T-shirts for the users avatars. The Ghostbusters costume is a replica of the costume used in the original film. On June 18, 2009, Loot released a Ghostbusters 25th Anniversary T-shirt for free in celebration of the 25th anniversary of Ghostbusters.

From May to June 2010, to celebrate a year with PlayStation Home, Loot featured a machinima contest for the Home users. The theme of the contest was "Aliens vs Androids II: The Fight for Freedom". Users got to decide how this fight should end. Each user that was a part of the winning video also received special PlayStation Home rewards with second and third-place winners also receiving a reward. This was only open to North America. The top five videos could be viewed on Loot's EOD screens.

== Games ==
Game title	Platform(s)	Year(s)	Notes
PlayStation Home products	PlayStation 3	2009–2014	Co-developed with London Studio
Forsaken Planet	Microsoft Windows	2012	
Devious Defender	Android, iOS	2013	
Forsaken Planet: First Day	Android, iOS	2013	
Sorcerer's Odyssey	Android, iOS	2014	
The Last Tinker: City of Colors	PlayStation 4	2014	Co-developed with Mimimi Productions
Fluster Cluck	PlayStation 4	2014	
Q*bert Rebooted	PlayStation 3, PlayStation 4, PlayStation Vita, Xbox One	2015	Co-developed with Gonzo Games and Sideline Amusements
Dojo Quest	Android, iOS	2015	Tie in to the film Pixels
Whispering Willows	PlayStation 4, PlayStation Vita	2015	Co-developed with Night Light Interactive
Velocibox	PlayStation 4, PlayStation Vita	2015	Co-developed with Shawn Beck Games
Back to Bed	PlayStation 3, PlayStation 4, PlayStation Vita	2015	Co-developed with Bedtime Digital Games
Electronic Super Joy	PlayStation 4, Xbox One	2016	Co-developed with Michael Todd Games
JumpJet Rex	PlayStation 4, Xbox One	2016	Co-developed with TreeFortress Games
