= Global War (video game) =

1979 video game

- Publisher: Muse Software
- Designer: Alan M. Boyd
- Platform: Apple II
- Release: 1979

Global War is a 1979 video game published by Muse Software for the Apple II. It was written in Applesoft BASIC by Alan M. Boyd.

== Contents ==
Global War is a game involving the production of armies, and is a clone of the tabletop board game Risk.

== Reception ==
Alan Isabelle reviewed Global War in The Space Gamer No. 34. Isabelle commented that "The game has attractive features, but is not worth [the price]."
