= Whispering Willows =

2014 video game

- Developer: Night Light Interactive (Note: Ported to PlayStation 4 and PlayStation Vita by Loot Interactive, ported to Xbox One and Wii U by Abstraction Games)
- Publisher: Night Light Interactive (Note: PlayStation 4 and PlayStation Vita ports published by Loot Interactive; Xbox One and Wii U ports published by Abstraction Games; Nintendo Switch version published by Akupara Games)
- Composer: Steve Goldshein
- Engine: Unity
- Platforms: Ouya: Linux; OS X; Windows; PlayStation 4; PlayStation Vita; Xbox One; Wii U; Android; iOS; Nintendo Switch
- Release: May 27, 2014: Ouya; May 27, 2014; Linux, OS X, Windows; July 9, 2014; PlayStation 4, Vita; June 30, 2015; Android, iOS, Xbox One; August 28, 2015; Wii U; October 8, 2015; Nintendo Switch; September 27, 2018
- Genre: Adventure
- Mode: Single-player

Whispering Willows is an indie adventure horror video game developed by independent developer Night Light Interactive for Ouya in May 2014.

== Gameplay ==
The player takes control of Elena Elkhorn who wants to rescue her father. With her pendant, she can access her shamanic powers: the ability to leave her physical body and explore the world in spirit form. Using this ability, she can fly through gaps in walls and reach new places. The player can also possess certain objects, such as levers, to manipulate the environment. Throughout the game, the player finds notes from ghosts, which reveal new things. To advance in the game, the player has to find items and use them on certain objects.

== Plot ==
Young Elena Elkhorn embarks on a harrowing journey to find her missing father and discover the secrets of the Willows Mansion. Aiding her journey is a unique amulet she received from her father, which allows her to astrally project her spirit into a ghostly realm and communicate with the dead.

=== Characters ===
- Elena Elkhorn: The protagonist who wants to rescue her father.
- John Elkhorn: Elena's missing father and descendant of the Kwantako tribe.
- Wortham Willows: The antagonist. He was the mayor of the city and searched for a way to revive his dead wife.
- Flying Hawk: A shaman who wanted to have a peaceful meeting with the white men.
- Darby O'Halloran: An old friend of Wortham's. He is haunted by the memories of Sky Flower, a little girl he once killed.
- Fleur le Rue: Wortham's secret new love affair.

== Development and release ==
Whispering Willows was funded via Kickstarter. With 750 backers and $20,747 the game exceeded its initial goal of $15,000. Michael Johnson created a live-action trailer for the game's release. Skyler Davenport recorded voice acting for the role of Elena. The game was translated into Spanish, German, French, Italian, Russian, Polish, Chinese, Ukrainian and Brazilian Portuguese. The soundtrack by Steve Goldshein was released on January 9, 2018 by video game music label Materia Collective.

The game was initially released in 2014 for Ouya on May 27. It was released for Steam via Linux, OS X, Windows on July 9, following a delay from an initial release date of June 17. Developed and published by Loot Interactive, ports for PlayStation 4 and PlayStation Vita were released on June 30, 2015. Versions for Android and iOS were developed by Night Light Interactive and released on August 28, 2015. The game was also ported by Abstraction Games to Xbox One and Wii U on August 28 and October 8, respectively. A version for Nintendo Switch published by Akupara Games was released on September 27, 2018.

== Reception ==
Reception

Aggregate score
Aggregator	Score
Metacritic	(PC) 64/100 (PS4) 63/100 (Wii U) 58/100 (XONE) 57/100

Review scores
Publication	Score
Adventure Gamers	2.5/5 (PC)
Electronic Gaming Monthly	6/10 (PS4)
GameSpot	7/10 (PS4)
IGN	5.8/10 (PS4)
Nintendo Life	5/10 (Wii U)

Whispering Willows received "mixed or average" reviews according to video game review aggregator Metacritic. Critics praised the game's visuals with Shuva Raha from Adventure Gamers saying that the game is "good-looking" and Electronic Gaming Monthly reviewer Mollie Patterson calling the game's graphics "great". However reviewers noted the boring gameplay with Shuva Raha saying that "the simplistic – often to the point of boring – gameplay, along with poor design that attempts to prolong playing time by inserting hours of completely avoidable backtracking, reduces the experience to a grind".

== Awards ==
Whispering Willows has won the following awards:

- Casual Connect Indie Prize - Winner 2014 for "Best Story," Finalist for "Best Desktop Game" and "Best Art"
- Seattle Indie Gaming Competition - Winner 2014
- OUYA CREATE Game Jam - Winner 2013 for "Most Immersive," Finalist for "Grand Prize" and "Best Visuals"
- Captivate Conference Game Design Competition – Finalist 2013
- Cerebral Indie Developer Grant – Winner 2013

== Sequel ==
In an interview, Logan said that a sequel might be possible, depending on how the game does on consoles. They already started preplanning for the continuation of the story.
