= Electronic Super Joy =

2013 video game

- Developers: Michael Todd Games; Loot Interactive (XBO)
- Publisher: Michael Todd Games
- Designers: Michael Todd; Cassie Chui
- Composer: EnV
- Engine: Unity
- Platforms: Windows, OS X, Linux, Xbox One, Wii U, PlayStation 4, Switch
- Release: Windows, Linux, OS X; August 23, 2013; Wii U; November 5, 2015; Xbox One; January 20, 2016; PlayStation 4; June 21, 2016; Switch; November 28, 2019
- Genre: Platform
- Mode: Single-player

Electronic Super Joy is a 2013 platform game created by Michael Todd. The game was released on Microsoft Windows, OS X, Linux, Wii U, PlayStation 4, Xbox One, and Nintendo Switch.

== Gameplay ==
Gameplay

The game is a humorous platformer following a human character as he navigates a music-drenched world seeking revenge for his stolen butt. The player is able to run, jump (sometimes fly, or double jump on levels), and "smash", an attack that causes the character to drop directly downwards. Obstacles include mazes, special surfaces that impede or otherwise affect the player's movement, moving levels that force the player to move quickly, and enemies, some of which shoot missiles. The player passes numerous checkpoints in game levels that they resume from if they die.

The game contains 45 levels in three worlds, with a boss fight taking several levels at the end of each world. A recent update added another world and 3 bonus levels, themed on the jungle and winter, respectively. The fourth world can only be accessed after the player has collected all of the 22 'Stars' scattered across various levels.

== Development ==
The original prototype name was called Techno Ninja. It had 20 minutes of gameplay in one long level, using one color style (Pink) and only one of EnV's music tracks. The player had the ability to double jump & ground-pound ('Smash' in the game's terminology). The game was intended to initially release in 2012, but missed that date, released on August 23, 2013.

A PlayStation Vita release was planned, but later cancelled.

== Legacy ==
In 2014, a sequel was released titled Electronic Super Joy: Groove City. The gameplay and music style were similar to the original, and was released on all of the original platforms as well as the Wii U before its predecessor, but the sequel was released only in North America. The plot centers around a giant robot that destroys Groove City.
