= Desperados III =

2020 video game

- Developer: Mimimi Games
- Publisher: THQ Nordic
- Director: Dominik Abé
- Artist: Bianca Dörr
- Writer: Martin Hamberger
- Composer: Filippo Beck Peccoz
- Series: Desperados
- Engine: Unity
- Platforms: Microsoft Windows; PlayStation 4 Xbox One; Linux macOS
- Release: Windows, PS4, Xbox One; 16 June 2020; Linux, macOS; 2 September 2020
- Genre: Real-time tactics
- Mode: Single-player

Desperados III is a 2020 real-time tactics video game, developed by Mimimi Games, published by THQ Nordic, and released Microsoft Windows, PlayStation 4, Xbox One, Linux, and macOS. The game is the fourth installment in the Desperados series following the 2007 spin-off title Helldorado, and serves as a prequel to Desperados: Wanted Dead or Alive, with the story focusing on a bounty hunter who assembles a posse of allies to help him bring down a bandit leader responsible for killing his father.

The game received favourable reviews from critics, praising the gameplay, level design and character interactions, and later received a number of updates and DLC content.

== Gameplay ==
Desperados III is a real-time tactics stealth video game, which operates on a similar priniciple to the Commandoes (series), where players need to clear a series of missions, each with specific objectives, making use of the abilities of different characters to overcome enemies and difficult situations.

Enemies in each mission will react to seeing a character in their sight - represented by a view cone, divided between two zones: a dashed area in which characters can avoid detection if crouched; a full colour area, in which detection is unavoidable if entered, unless the character is hiding in a bush; and a dull faded area in which the enemy's view is obscured by an obstacle (such as a high rooftop). Some missions at night will reduce an enemy's ability to see, unless they use a lamp or view an area illuminated by a source of light. Once an enemy detects a character, their viewcone starts filling to yellow until it reaches the character, whereupon it turns red and causes the enemy to raise the alarm and begin attacking the character; until they are either dead or manage to lose sight of them. Players can view an enemy's viewcone, or plant a marker to see which enemies are able to see an area.

In some missions, the game features a neutral "Civil Zone" area, in which enemies will not detect characters unless they do something suspicious; civilians will also react negatively to a character's presence if they do something suspicious in their presence. Some buildings also house reserve enemies, who will be brought in if an alarm is raised and become active when the situation has calmed; a guardhouse will stop supplying reinforcements when no more guards remain within.

In this screenshot, the player uses showdown mode to plan to attack two enemies.

Players can either knock out and tie up enemies or eliminate them with lethal methods, including through environmental kills (dropping a boulder, or making an animal lash out on nearby enemies). Any enemy that is dead or incapacitated can be hidden inside bushes, wells, empty buildings, or into rivers or down cliffs; if any body is found by patrolling enemies, a dashed line appears, which fills up until it reaches the body, whereupon the enemy raises the alarm.

Each character in the game comes equipped with different abilities, and different strengths and weaknesses - for example some characters move faster than others, while others can climb up vines and ropes. Alongside lethal and non-lethal takedowns, each character's abilities include: ranged attacks; a distraction/lure method (which is less effective on certain enemies); and healing abilities. Abilities have a recharge time, meaning they can't be used in quick succession, while certain abilities and actions have a limit on the number of times they can be used - guns have limited ammo, which can be replenished through containers for specific characters.

Desperados III introduces a new gameplay element to the series known as "Showdown Mode" - a means of co-ordinating several characters in the team to conduct actions in synch with each other. When activated, the game pauses time (except on higher difficulties), allowing players to synch the actions of certain characters, including a waypoint system to direct how they act or move.

== Plot ==
=== Setting ===
Desperados III takes place several years before the events of Desperados: Wanted Dead or Alive, during the Wild West period in the 1870s, and provides an origin story to the series' protagonist John Cooper. The events of the game take place across Colorado, Louisiana and Mexico, with the plot borrowing several elements from the Spaghetti Western film Once Upon a Time in the West.

=== Synopsis ===
John Cooper, a young boy, accompanies his bounty hunter father James, as he pursues notorious bandit leader Frank to the Devil's Canyon, Mexico. Whilst John is left alone to practice knife throwing, on a promise he will get a gun, James pursues Frank on his own, and is killed in an ambush. Upon learning what happened, John vows to avenge his father's death.

Several years later, John, now a bounty hunter himself, travels to the town of Flagstone, Colorado. Upon arriving in the town, he meets with his friend Hector Mendoza, who reveals that Frank, now working for wealthy industrialist Vincent DeVitt, is meeting with the town's mayor. The following day, the mayor makes ready for his wedding with local ranch girl Kate O'Hara, who overhears him and Frank discuss the recent sale of her family's ranch to DeVitt's railroad company. Angered, she kills the mayor, just as John arrives seeking Frank. After escaping from the mayor's guard, Kate asks John for his help to aid her uncle Ian in defending the ranch, leading him recruit assistance from Hector, alongside Doctor McCoy, a skilled sniper and doctor, who he met on the train to Flagstone. Although the group defend the ranch, Ian dies after being fatally shot, leading Kate to seek revenge against DeVitt.

John soon discovers Frank left Flagstone to meet DeVitt in New Orleans. Aided by Hector, McCoy and Kate, the group pursue after him, only for DeVitt to capture them. However, John is surprised when a voodoo practitioner, Isabelle Moreau, helps them to escape, seeking their aid to find her partner Marshall Wayne, who was investigating DeVitt. The team learn from Isabelle that Frank and his men have been imprisoning people across Louisiana's wetlands and shipping them off to work in DeVitt's mining operations. After rescuing Wayne and destroying an old riverboat used by Frank, New Orleans is placed on lockdown. Voicing his desire to face Frank alone, John snaps when Hector mentions his father's fate and shoots them in the arm. Going alone, John duels with Frank on a ship, where he is outgunned and wounded, causing him and the others to be captured again, and sent to one of DeVitt's mines.

A week after they arrive, John and the others manage to escape the mine; however, McCoy decides to cut his losses and abandon the group. Returning to Wayne, John undertakes a commission from him to abduct DeVitt from a lavish party at his mansion. Although John and the others succeed, DeVitt manages to outwit them, until McCoy returns to rescue them. With his group back together, John discovers Frank returned to Mexico, and determines he fled back to Devil's Canyon. Aided by his friends, the team pursue after Frank, whereupon John faces off against him in another stand-off. Aided by the others, who overpower Frank's men, John gains the upper hand and defeats Frank, avenging his father's death.

=== Money for the Vultures DLC ===
Three months after the death of Frank, John and his team find themselves approached by Rosie Adams - a woman whom they encountered during their pursuit of Frank, who made them rob a bank for her. Rosie reveals that she needs the group's help to secure DeVitt's gold, which was hidden in his mansion. Agreeing to her request, John, aided by McCoy, Hector, and Kate, break into the mansion, now deserted and being looted by bandits. Finding the safe containing the gold, John is surprised when they discover a note within revealing that, after DeVitt was captured, the gold was moved by his brother Magnus DeVitt.

Joined by Isabelle, the group head to Magnus' plantation to confront him, uncovering a map showing that the gold was moved to an old fortress called "The Eagle's Nest". Heading to the site, the group discover it occupied by Frank's former henchmen. With help from Rosie, the group defeat the occupants and recover the gold. As they celebrate their success, Hector betrays the group, who runs off with the gold along with Rosie.

== Development ==
The game was developed by German studio Mimimi Games, the developer of Shadow Tactics: Blades of the Shogun, which borrows many gameplay mechanics and assets from this game; Cooper, for instance, plays very similar to Hayato. Desperados III also uses the same game engine, Unity (game engine), which allowed Mimimi Games to adapt and improve many of the aspects from Shadow Tactics into this game. THQ Nordic, which acquired the rights to the franchise from Atari in 2013, served as the game's publisher. Since the last game in the series was released more than a decade ago, the team made Desperados III a prequel story so that it can be accessible to new players who are new to the franchise or new to the genre. To achieve this, the team ensured that the game features an adequate tutorial system that teaches the player the gameplay foundation, and implemented gamepad controls for players who use a controller to play. The game's showdown mode, which allows players to pause time completely, was created after receiving players' feedback about the limitations of Shadow Tactics's "shadow mode". Unlike Shadow Tactics, the game features a more playful tone, with characters bantering with each other more frequently.

The game was officially announced by THQ Nordic in August 2018. Initially set to be released in 2019, the game was released on 16 June 2020 for Microsoft Windows, PlayStation 4 and Xbox One, and on 2 September 2020 for Linux and macOS.

=== Updates and expansions ===
Beginning in July 2020, Mimimi and THQ Nordic started supplying free updates for the game, which include additional mission scenarios. The first updates entail a loose frame story, titled The Baron's Challenge, in which the main characters get hired by an enigmatic figure, who is simply known as the Baron, to undertake certain missions for the entertainment of his patrons. Each mission can be unlocked with the successful completion of one or several levels in the main game. While the settings are basically the same as in the main story, each of the 14 new missions includes a different objective, sometimes with the characters having their in-play options restricted. In one example the player is required to eliminate certain enemies using environmental kills only, meaning that their other weapons are locked down for the scenario's duration.

Between September and November, Mimimi and THQ Nordic also published a purchasable three-part DLC story expansion, titled "Money for the Vultures".

In December, two new updates were provided: The "Veteran Bounty Hunter Mode", which allows the player to optionally add the other protagonists to a level where any of them were originally not available (this option does not exist for the Baron's Challenges), and the "Level Editor Light", a cheat which allows (in the PC version only) the complete rearrangement of a mission map's characters and items.

== Reception ==
Reception

Aggregate scores
Aggregator	Score
Metacritic	(PC) 86/100 (PS4) 82/100 (XONE) 85/100
OpenCritic	96% recommend

Review scores
Publication	Score
GameSpot	9/10
GameStar	88/100
Hardcore Gamer	4.5/5
IGN	8/10
PC Gamer (US)	86/100
PC Games (DE)	9/10
Push Square	7/10
USgamer	4.5/5

Desperados III received "generally favorable" reviews, according to review aggregator platform Metacritic. Fellow review aggregator OpenCritic assessed that the game received "mighty" approval, being recommended by 96% of critics.

IGN enjoyed the game's character interactions, saying they gave charm to an otherwise standard Western, saying: "Their contextual banter as you make your way through each murderous mission really helps to define their individual personalities, making for an outlaw gang I was consistently happy to be at the reins of". GameSpot praised the save system, writing that it gave the player freedom to take risks without consequence, saying: "What's remarkable is that this quick-save and quick-load routine never becomes frustrating. Instead it feels liberating. You're free to try new things and give all kinds of wild ideas a shot". USgamer felt the distinct characters rewarded mastery of their abilities, "The stringent focus of each character allows Mimimi to craft each level with those characters in mind... Desperados 3 rewards the player's knowledge of how team fits together and where skill overlap and diverge".

While liking the showdown system, PC Gamer criticized the visuals as being mostly uninteresting, saying: "Though they're impressive stealth sandboxes, none of the maps are lookers. There's a lot of mud, sand and ramshackle buildings, and while the gang's journey takes them across a few regions, a lot of the maps lack a distinct visual identity, especially compared to Shadow Tactics". Rock Paper Shotgun praised the character of Isabelle Moreau, feeling she was a standout from the cast, saying: "Nicely voiced by Debra Wilson, and possessing two voodoo-inspired abilities that are refreshingly different and a hoot to use, the sickle-wielding Creole sorceress is a lovely addition to the canon. Busy 'connecting' foes and mind-controlling them, I'd be surprised if series veterans found themselves missing Mia Yung, Sam Williams, and Hawkeye".

Desperados III was nominated for the category of Best Sim/Strategy game at The Game Awards 2020, as well as a nomination for Strategy/Simulation Game of the Year at the 24th Annual D.I.C.E. Awards.
