= Ugh! (video game) =

1992 video game

- Title screen
- Developer(s): Egosoft
- Publisher(s): Play Byte
- Platform(s): MS-DOS, Amiga, Commodore 64
- Release: 1992
- Genre(s): Action
- Mode(s): Single-player, multiplayer

Ugh! is an arcade/flight game developed by Egosoft and published in 1992 by Play Byte for the Amiga, Commodore 64, and MS-DOS. It is a clone of the 1984 Commodore 64 game Space Taxi.

Ugh! was later distributed as shareware mainly via Bulletin Board Systems and magazine cover disks.

== Gameplay ==
The game features a caveman who, in order to appeal to his beloved future mate, controls a stone-age muscle-powered helicopter, picking up passengers and flying them to the desired location for money. The player must venture through 69 levels, and must evade natural obstacles as well as hostile Dinosaurs and "Birds" (actually pterosaurs). Collisions with obstacles, hard landings and touching obstacles with the helicopter's rotor inflict damage to the helicopter. Also, powering the helicopter exhausts the pilot, which may be recovered by picking up fruits knocked off a Tree with a Stone. Stone may be also dropped on a hostile monster, knocking it out for a short time.

There is a cooperative simultaneous two player mode.

The game keeps tracks of the player's progress using level codes; the codes for single player levels are Christian Death song titles, while the two-player codes are song titles by Current 93.
