= Michael Todd (video game developer) =

Canadian video game designer

- Born: August 25, 1989 (age 37); Toronto, Canada
- Other names: thegamedesigner, M.T.Hammer
- Occupation: Video game developer

Michael Todd (born 1989) is a Canadian independent video game programmer and designer. He is an active member of the Toronto video game developer community, and an advocate for mental health awareness within the profession.

== Early life and education ==
Todd was born in 1987 in Toronto, and was home schooled as his family followed his father, a Reverend with the Anglican church. He is the brother to four siblings, three of whom are adopted from various countries, including Ethiopia and China. Todd moved with his family to the Northwest Territories, through Europe, and then to Halifax, Nova Scotia.

At age 10, Todd's interest in computer games began to develop even though his father would not allow Todd to have a computer or video games. Todd was suggested by a friend, Zachary, to turn his drawings into video games. Todd's first attempt at creating a video game was a failure, but it sparked a curiosity in him that led him to want to learn more. He began to explore videogames in secret and built his first computer at the age of 13 after some persuasion as well as paid for his own internet. Game designing was trial and error for Todd during his early years.

At age 12, Michael Todd travelled with the Bluenose Jugglers, a Nova Scotian busker troop. At age 13, he learned to unicycle.

He eventually moved back in Toronto following a soul-searching trip to Africa. As a video game developer, Todd is primarily self-taught, and has been creating games with various levels of success since he was 13 years old, and has been developing games as his professional, full-time occupation since age 17. His first financially successful commercial title is Engine of War in 2009.

== Career ==
Throughout his career, Todd has headed a number of small game development studios, varyingly composed of himself only, or himself along with a small team of employees. These include:

- Akith Games (2000–2006)
- SpyeArt (2006–2011)
- Michael Todd Games (2011–present)

Todd is a prolific speaker and has lectured at worldwide events, including GDC, PAX, GamerCamp, NoMoreSweden, IGDA Toronto, IGDA Phoenix and the Hand Eye Society. Todd takes an active interest in speaking to those learning about game development. His topics include: game design, lifestyle and professional development in the video games industry, the benefits of going indie vs. AAA, formal and vocational education, skill set development, and employment standards. He has engaged his audiences in Q&A sessions, seminars, round-table discussions, and welcomes students' questions and participation in the industry. He has helped develop Toronto Skillswap's events, a collective that runs workshops related to various game development topics.

=== Ludography ===
Year	Video Game	Platform
2009	Engine of War	Windows
2009	Broken Brothers	Windows
2010	Silent Skies	Windows
2012	Little Gardens	Windows/Mac
2013	Electronic Super Joy	Windows/Mac/Linux
2014	Electronic Super Joy Groove City	Windows/Mac/Linux
2019	Electronic Super Joy 2	Windows/Mac/Linux

=== Mental Health Awareness ===
In 2011, Michael Todd gave a lecture during the Independent Game Summit of the Game Developers Conference titled "Turning Depression into Inspiration". In the talk, Todd discussed his own decade-long battle with depression, and the coping mechanisms he had devised to funnel his emotions into his creative work. In 2013, as Todd was putting the final touches on Electronic Super Joy, he gave an interview to Polygon about his process of developing games through depression.
