= Muse Software =

Former American video game developer

Micro Users Software Exchange, Inc.
- Trade name: Muse Software
- Company type: Private
- Industry: Video games
- Founded: August 1, 1978; 47 years ago
- Founder: Ed Zaron
- Defunct: October 7, 1987
- Fate: Chapter 7 bankruptcy
- Headquarters: Baltimore, Maryland, U.S.
- Area served: North America
- Key people: Ed Zaron; Silas S. Warner; John F. Kutcher
- Products: Castle Wolfenstein; Beyond Castle Wolfenstein

Micro Users Software Exchange, Inc., doing business as Muse Software, was an American video game developer based in Baltimore, Maryland, focusing on the development of games for the first generation of home computers. The company began with developing games for Apple II, and later expanded to the Commodore 64, Atari 8-bit computers, and IBM PC compatibles. They are best known for creating the Wolfenstein series, having developed the first two installments: 1981's Castle Wolfenstein and its 1984 sequel, Beyond Castle Wolfenstein. The brand name lapsed and was used by id Software.

== History ==
Muse Software was incorporated by Ed Zaron on August 1, 1978, with Silas S. Warner becoming the first employee. Initially publishing games, the team also sold non-game software such as Super-Text, a word processor written by Zaron, and Appilot, a course-writing language written by Warner. Their original market was for the Apple II, with their first programs sold on cassettes, and later on floppy disks. They expanded their software offerings for the Atari 8-bit computers and Commodore 64, plus ported both Castle Wolfenstein games to the IBM PC. The company also ran a retail store on the corner of Charles Street and Mulberry Street in Baltimore, called "Muse Software and Computer Center," which was closed down in 1982.

At its peak, Muse was making more than US$2 million per year in sales. According to Zaron, the growth of Muse's sales was "extremely slow" because of a slump in the home computer software market. The company, which had about 40 employees at its peak in 1983, had shrunk down to just six prior to filing for Chapter 7 bankruptcy protection in 1985. Warner, who was leaving Muse to join MicroProse, said the company had difficulty setting up a sales program because of the long-term illness of a key sales employee. Muse Software was found to be in forfeiture on October 7, 1987.

In 1992, id Software released Wolfenstein 3D, based on Muse Software's Wolfenstein intellectual property. It brought the Wolfenstein brand to a much larger audience.

== Games developed ==
| Year | Title | Platform |
|---|---|---|
| 1978 | Maze Game | Apple II |
| 1978 | Escape! | Apple II |
| 1978 | Side Show | Apple II |
| 1978 | Tank War | Apple II |
| 1979 | Global War | Apple II |
| 1979 | Three Mile Island | Apple II |
| 1980 | ABM | Apple II |
| 1980 | Three Mile Island: Special Edition | Apple II |
| 1981 | International Gran Prix | Apple II |
| 1981 | RobotWar | Apple II |
| 1981 | Castle Wolfenstein | Apple II, Atari 8-bit, Commodore 64, MS-DOS |
| 1982 | The Caverns of Freitag | Apple II |
| 1982 | The Cube Solution | Apple II |
| 1982 | Firebug | Apple II |
| 1982 | Frazzle | Apple II |
| 1983 | Advanced Blackjack | Apple II |
| 1983 | Titan Empire | Apple II |
| 1983 | Rescue Squad | Commodore 64 |
| 1984 | Beyond Castle Wolfenstein | Apple II, Atari 8-bit, Commodore 64, MS-DOS |
| 1984 | Intellectual Decathlon | Apple II |
| 1984 | Space Taxi | Commodore 64 |
| 1985 | Leaps and Bounds! | Atari 8-bit, Commodore 64 |
