= 005 =

1981 video game

- Developer: Sega R&D Japan
- Publishers: JP: Sega; NA: Sega/Gremlin
- Platform: Arcade
- Release: JP: December 1981; NA: 2December 28, 1981
- Genres: Stealth, maze
- Modes: Single-player, multiplayer
- Arcade system: G80

005 (pronounced "double-o five") is a 1981 arcade video game by Sega. They advertised it as the first of their RasterScan Convert-a-Game series, designed so that it could be changed into another game in minutes "at a substantial savings."

It is one of the first examples of a stealth game, and the first to use a "vision cone" mechanic, which allows players to see the precise field of view of their enemies. 005 is also credited for being the first game to introduce the concept of a "hub world" in games.

Gameplay screenshot

== Gameplay ==
Largely inspired by James Bond (the title itself is a tribute or parody to the secret agent's codename 007), the player's mission is to take a briefcase of secret documents to a waiting helicopter. The player controls a spy who must avoid the enemies as he makes his way through buildings and warehouses, where he will have to dodge the enemies' flashlights and use boxes as hiding spots.

== Reception ==
Upon release, 005 received a positive review from Cash Box magazine. They called it an "exciting new multi-scene computer video spy chase game" with challenging gameplay requiring skill and praised the game's multiple alternate escape routes with challenging obstacles such as enemy patrols and slippery ice. They said it "combines the challenge and thrills of four games in one" along with appealing cartoon-style graphics as well as suspenseful music and sound.

== High score ==
Dwayne Richard holds the Guinness World Records high score for this game with a maximum possible 1,500,000 points. The record was set in May 2002.
