= Action Quest =

1982 video game

- Developer: JV Software
- Publishers: JV Software; Roklan
- Designer: Jack Verson
- Platform: Atari 8-bit
- Release: NA: May 1982
- Genre: Action
- Mode: Single-player

Action Quest is a video game written by Jack Verson for Atari 8-bit computers. It was published in 1982 by his company, JV Software. Action Quest combines real-time action with puzzle solving as the player explores 30 rooms in an attempt to collect 20 treasures. Reviewers found the combination to be different from how puzzles in games—such as graphic adventures—worked at the time.

== Gameplay ==
Gameplay screenshot

The player takes the role of a gun-carrying ghost exploring a world divided into 5 levels with 6 rooms on each. Rooms contain monsters or timed-puzzles. The gun is used both to defend against monsters and to aid in puzzle solving.

== Reception ==
The Creative Atari commented on the generic name, but found the real-time aspect to be "a rather radical departure from the format of traditional adventure games." The style was also new to John J. Anderson of Computer Gaming World's "Atari Arcade" column: "Rather than entering coded text commands, as one would expect with a conventional adventure program, this program is played solely with joystick and trigger."

In a "B−" review, the Book of Atari Software 1983 stated, "The game's sounds and graphics are fair. The puzzle content is high enough that it will take several hours to retrieve all twenty treasures." John Anderson agreed about the puzzles: "The play-value of this program won't diminish until you've reached the thirtieth room, which shall take quite some time to accomplish".

== Legacy ==
Action Quest was followed by a sequel from the same author, Ghost Encounters. Both games were later combined on a cartridge and published by Roklan as Castle Hassle.
