= Desperados (video game series) =

- Early logotype for Desperados III
- Genre: Real-time tactics
- Developers: Spellbound Entertainment (2001–07); Mimimi Games (2020)
- Publishers: Infogrames/Atari SA (2001-2006); Viva Media (2007); THQ Nordic (2020-present)
- Platforms: Microsoft Windows, MacOS, Linux, PlayStation 4, Xbox One
- First release: Desperados: Wanted Dead or Alive; 20 April 2001
- Latest release: Desperados III; 16 June 2020

Desperados is a real-time tactics video game series originally developed by Spellbound Entertainment, which was then acquired by THQ Nordic on 24 June 2013. The series is set in the 1880s Midwest, its main protagonist John Cooper deals with living the life of a cowboy, often coming to blows with other criminals and bandits as he struggles to make a living as an outlaw. The series gameplay revolves around stealth with players having the option to take out enemies one by one or going in guns blazing, either by controlling John or numerous other player characters that help John along the way.

== Games ==
Aggregate review scores
Game	Metacritic
Desperados: Wanted Dead or Alive	(PC) 78/100
Desperados 2: Cooper's Revenge	(PC) 66/100
Helldorado	(PC) 65/100
Desperados III	(PC) 86/100 (PS4) 82/100 (XONE) 85/100

=== Desperados: Wanted Dead or Alive (2001) ===
Released in 2001, Desperados: Wanted Dead or Alive was developed by Spellbound Entertainment and published by Infogrames for Microsoft Windows. In the game, the player controls up to six characters in an Old West setting, led by knife-fighter and gunslinger John Cooper. A modernized version of the game was released in July 2018 adding dubs in multiple languages, improving compatibility with newer versions of Windows, and porting the game to MacOS and Linux.

=== Desperados 2: Cooper's Revenge (2006) ===
The sequel Desperados 2: Cooper's Revenge was released in 2006, again developed by Spellbound Entertainment and published by Atari for Microsoft Windows. John Cooper returns as the protagonist, setting out to avenge the death of his brother, US Marshal Ross Cooper.

=== Helldorado (2007) ===
Helldorado was first announced as an expansion to Desperados 2, using elements that had been scrapped during development. It was instead released as a stand-alone game continuing the story of Desperados 2. The game was released in 2007 in Europe and 2009 in North America with Viva Media as the publisher.

=== Desperados III (2020) ===
The series was revived in 2020 with Desperados III, developed by Mimimi Games and published by THQ Nordic for Microsoft Windows, PlayStation 4, Xbox One, Linux, and MacOS. The story is a prequel to the first Desperados game, exploring the origins of protagonist John Cooper in the 1870s.

== Cancelled title ==
Spellbound was developing a follow-up with more multiplayer and steampunk-oriented elements, Desperados Gangs. However, they canceled it because they were unable to find a publisher to fund the project.

== Recurring cast and characters ==
List indicator

This section includes characters who will appear or have appeared in at least two games.

- An empty grey cell indicates the character was not in the film, or that the character's official presence has not yet been confirmed.

Cast and characters of Desperados series
Character	Game			
Character	Desperados: Wanted Dead or Alive	Desperados 2: Cooper's Revenge	Helldorado	Desperados III
John Cooper	John Chancer	Appeared	Appeared	Doug Gochman
Hawkeye		Appeared	Appeared	
Arthur "Doc" McCoy	Garrick Hagon	Appeared	Appeared	Todd Haberkorn
Kate O'Hara	Denica Fairman	Appeared	Appeared	Erica Lindbeck
Pablo Sanchez	John Guerrasio	Appeared	Appeared	
Samuel Williams	Dean Hill	Appeared	Appeared	Mentioned
