= Mimimi Games =

German video game developer

Mimimi Games GmbH
- Type: Private
- Industry: Video games
- Founded: 13 January 2011; 15 years ago
- Founders: Dominik Abé; Johannes Roth
- Defunct: December 2023
- Headquarters: Munich, Germany
- Key people: Johannes Roth (managing director)
- Number of employees: 38 (2021)
- Website: mimimi.games

Mimimi Games GmbH (formerly Mimimi Productions) was a German video game developer based in Munich that specialised in creating strategy and tactical games. It was founded in January 2011 by Dominik Abé and Johannes Roth, who had previously developed Grounded (2009) while studying video game design. Notable games developed by the studio include The Last Tinker: City of Colors (2014), Shadow Tactics: Blades of the Shogun (2016), Desperados III (2020), and Shadow Gambit: The Cursed Crew (2023). By November 2021, Mimimi Games employed 38 people. On 29 August 2023, the studio announced that it would be closing down.

== History ==
Mimimi Games began as a co-operation between Dominik Abé and Johannes Roth, video game design students at the Mediadesign Hochschule in Munich. In October 2008, they began working together under the name "Mimimi" and developed their first game, Grounded, which was released in November 2009. The game got second place in the "Gamesload Newcommer Awards" at the 2009 Deutscher Entwicklerpreis and was nominated in the "Best Concept from a Student Competition" category for the 2010 Deutscher Computerspielpreis ceremony.

Following Grounded's release, the team began working in the Unity game engine to create a game, later titled daWindci, in which the player would control the weather to direct a hot air balloon to a destination. A prototype for personal computers was shown at Gamescom 2010, where it received positive reception. However, its mouse-based input system was perceived as an obstacle and the studio was advised to bring the game to mobile devices instead. Planning to develop it for iPad devices, the team found that it would need approximately €15,000 to acquire the needed hardware and software, which they could not finance themselves. They thus turned to developer Reality Twist, which agreed to publish the game and Mimimi hired Florian Smolka and Lucas Reiner as artists to overhaul the game's style.

On 13 January 2011, Abé and Roth founded Mimimi Productions GbR, and daWindci was released on 14 April that year. Mimimi Productions was incorporated anew as Mimimi Productions UG in January 2012. A remake of DaWindci called DaWindci Deluxe was released for iOS and Android in July 2014.

On 29 August 2023, it was announced that the studio would be closing down due to the rising costs of development and not enough revenue being generated. The studio formally shut down in December of that year.

== Games developed ==
Year	Title	Publisher(s)	Platform(s)	Ref(s)
2011	daWindci	Reality Twist	iOS	
2014	The Last Tinker: City of Colors	Unity Games, Loot Entertainment	Linux, macOS, Windows, PlayStation 4	
2016	Shadow Tactics: Blades of the Shogun	Daedalic Entertainment	Linux, macOS, Windows, PlayStation 4, Xbox One	
2020	Desperados III	THQ Nordic	Linux, macOS, Windows, PlayStation 4, Xbox One	
2021	Shadow Tactics: Blades of the Shogun - Aiko's Choice	Daedalic Entertainment	Linux, Windows	
2023	Shadow Gambit: The Cursed Crew	Mimimi Games	Windows, PlayStation 5, Xbox Series X/S	
