= Castle Wolfenstein =

1981 video game

- Cover art by John Benson
- Developer: Muse Software
- Publisher: Muse Software
- Designer: Silas Warner
- Programmers: Silas Warner; Dale Gray; George Varndell
- Artist: John Benson
- Series: Wolfenstein
- Platforms: Apple II; Atari 8-bit; Commodore 64; MS-DOS
- Release: Apple II: NA: September 1981; Atari 8-bit: NA: 1982; Commodore 64: NA: 1983; MS-DOS: NA: 1984
- Genres: Action-adventure, stealth
- Mode: Single-player

Castle Wolfenstein is a 1981 action-adventure game developed by Silas Warner for the Apple II and published by Muse Software in 1981. It is one of the earliest games based on stealth mechanics. A port to Atari 8-bit computers was released in 1982, followed by Commodore 64 (1983) and MS-DOS (1984). The player takes the role of an Allied prisoner of war during World War II who is held captive in the fictional Castle Wolfenstein. After escaping from a cell, the player's objective is to find the Nazis' secret war plans and escape from the castle. Nazi soldiers can be dealt with via impersonation, sneaking, or killing.

Warner was inspired by the 1961 film The Guns of Navarone and the 1980 arcade video game Berzerk. The 60 room castle is procedurally generated.

Castle Wolfenstein was positively received by critics and became one of the best-selling games of the early 1980s. The game was praised for its graphics, and gameplay, but criticized for long waiting times when opening chests. It had a direct influence on modern stealth games. A sequel, Beyond Castle Wolfenstein, was released in 1984. The rights to the Wolfenstein name were purchased for the 1992 first person shooter Wolfenstein 3D.

== Gameplay ==
The player character is in green clothing. There are two unopened chests and a guard (C64).

Castle Wolfenstein is a two-dimensional action-adventure game played from a top-down perspective using a keyboard, joystick, or paddles. It has also been described as a maze game. There are eight difficulty levels in the game that are determined by the player's rank. The player takes the role of an Allied spy that has been captured by Nazis and imprisoned in a dungeon within Castle Wolfenstein for interrogation by the SS Stormtroopers. While the spy is waiting for interrogation, a dying prisoner emerges from a hiding place and hands the player a fully loaded pistol with 10 rounds, and three grenades before dying. The objective is to escape from the castle and if the player finds the battle plans before escaping, they will be promoted and the complexity of the subsequent run will be increased, while the castle's layout changes and the game starts again.

The game takes place in a procedurally-generated castle of approximately 60 rooms that house standard Nazi guards and SS Stormtroopers identified by their bulletproof vests marked with the SS insignia. Standard guards can be eliminated with a pistol and have a chance to surrender if the player points a pistol at them even if they have no ammunition, and SS Stormtroopers with grenades because they usually wear body armor. Enemies can be looted once surrendered or after they've been eliminated and can possess ammunition, grenades, and keys which can be used on doors and chests. Doors and chests can be opened more quickly by shooting at them but will attract the guards in the room, and if the chest contains ammunition and grenades, they will explode resulting in immediate death. Chests may contain bulletproof vests, uniforms, and secret documents, or sauerkraut, sausages, and schnapps that do not affect the gameplay. Uniforms allow the player character to pass guards unnoticed, but they are ineffective against SS Stormtroopers. If the player dies from enemy gunfire, the game restarts with the castle's layout preserved and the same chests and guards. If they are killed by their own grenade, the game restarts in a newly generated castle.

== Development and release ==
Castle Wolfenstein was developed by Silas Warner at Muse Software and the game's cover art was drawn by John Benson.

The game was initially conceptualized as a game set in the mid-1980s in what Warner describes as "a guy running around rooms" and did not know how to develop the game further. He was uninterested in using space as a setting due to his belief that there were so many of them on the market. The concept changed after Warner watched the 1961 British-American war film The Guns of Navarone and was amazed by the Allied commandos who broke into a German fortress to destroy the German artillery battery. Within the same day, he played Berzerk, a multidirectional shooter arcade video game in which the player navigates through a maze with laser-shooting robots. He decided to use the same concept but with Nazi soldiers instead of robots. His idea was to take the basic common concept of an arcade shoot 'em up, where players dodge enemies with the intent of killing them, and change the objective to escape the enemy guards and their castle with shooting guards simply a means to an end and not an end in itself.

Warner implemented procedural level generation to the game, which took 35 to 60 seconds to complete before the gameplay of the original Apple version started; as a result, the game produced a new set of 60 rooms, the arrangement of which was nearly always different. He designed the game's architecture using three programs, each of which was on separate floppy disks and later integrated into a single floppy disk. The first one initialized the graphics and shuffled 64 interchangeable floor plans. The second disk governed the behavior of the castle's guards, while the third disk handled the player character's behavior. According to Warner, a lot of work went into synchronizing the programs, and he was satisfied with the result. For the soundtrack, he implemented his own voice for the German guards, using Apple II software called The Voice (also published by Muse Software). He used eight German phrases, such as Achtung, Schweinhund, and Halt.

Muse Software released Castle Wolfenstein in September 1981 for the Apple II and the game was made on other platforms. A port to the Atari 8-bit computers was published six months after the Apple release, and a Commodore 64 version in 1983 and to MS-DOS in 1984. Following the game's release, a software developed by Moxie, The Great Escape Utility, was marketed in 1983, promising bug fixes to speed up the opening of chests and the startup time of the game. It also allowed players to choose their starting location and gain an unlimited amount of items. The software is regarded as the first commercial trainer in video gaming.

== Reception ==
Reception

Review scores
Publication	Score
AllGame	5/5
Computer Gaming World	1.5/5

Award
Publication	Award
Computer Gaming World	116th Best Game of All Time (1996)

According to Harvey Bernstein of Antic, after its release, Castle Wolfenstein "quickly shot to the top of the charts" and became "one of the most popular games for any microcomputer". In the October 1982 issue of Computer Gaming World, associate publisher and game merchandiser Dana Lombardy released an incomplete list of top-selling games as of 30 June 1982, where the game landed in 13th place with 20,000 copies sold. The game ultimately sold about 50,000 copies by 1983.

Creative Computing Video and Arcade Games's Andrew Brill complained about the Apple version's slow gameplay, which according to Brill is mainly due to the time taken to open chests that contain "completely useless" items, which Brill regarded as the game's "most frustrating feature", but added "thrill of the escape" is "worth the wait". Richard Herring of Ahoy!, reviewing the game's Commodore 64 version, also complained about Castle Wolfenstein's slow gameplay, especially the long time it took to open the chests. He also stated that each room must be loaded from the floppy disk, causing a lag when each room is entered. Herring also mentioned a bug, in which if the player character bumps into a wall, the screen "goes into hysterics for a few seconds". Herring added that playing the game with a keyboard is "inconvenient" as the player does not have time to perform game actions quickly enough but concluded by stating Castle Wolfenstein has "simple but effective graphics" and called the game "addicting". InfoWorld's Essential Guide to Atari Computers recommended the game as among the best adventure games for the Atari 8-bit, stating that while entertaining it was "too gory for young kids". Antic criticized the Atari 8-bit version's porting of the Apple II original's "lousy sound and black-white-green-purple graphics". In a 1991 Computer Gaming World survey of strategy and war games, M. Evan Brooks called the game an "arcade classic", and stated that despite the outdated graphics, it had remained in his "fond memories". In 1996, the same magazine listed Castle Wolfenstein as the 116th best game of all time.

== Legacy ==
In 1984, Muse Software released a sequel, Beyond Castle Wolfenstein, with similar graphics and gameplay. It adds some new features, such as the use of a knife, the ability to bribe guards, and a pass system in which guards periodically summon the player character and ask him or her to show the correct pass.

Castle Wolfenstein directly influenced the 1992 game Wolfenstein 3D developed by id Software. John Romero stated the original idea was to create a 3D Castle Wolfenstein but did not have the rights to the game during development. Many options for the game's title were proposed and rejected and, eventually, id Software bought the rights to use Wolfenstein from Silas Warner. The original concept of Wolfenstein 3D changed significantly because the developers decided the core of the gameplay would be fast and simple so features such as the ability to drag and loot fallen enemy soldiers were withdrawn. Further development by other studios led to the emergence of one of the longest-living video game series; as of 2021, there are 13 Wolfenstein games, the most recent of which, Wolfenstein: Youngblood and Wolfenstein: Cyberpilot, are spin-offs released in 2019.

Multiple media outlets considered Castle Wolfenstein to be significant in the shaping of the stealth games genre. Though no more Wolfenstein games were released by Muse Entertainment after Beyond Castle Wolfenstein, Metal Gear series and several other video games took elements and inspiration from the two original games. Casey Alkaisy, marketing manager at DICE, in his review of stealth games on Gamasutra, said the first foundations of the stealth genre were laid down in Pac-Man but its game mechanics only took shape with the advent of Castle Wolfenstein, after which other games using the same ideas began to appear. In its review of the series, Xbox Wire called Castle Wolfenstein a "proto-stealth game" that contains "innovations that would go on to become standards in the stealth genre". When speaking with Retro Gamer, Wolfenstein 3D co-creator John Romero credited Castle Wolfenstein as the "original stealth shooter". Castle Smurfenstein, a modified version of the game replacing assets and text with references to The Smurfs, is considered one of the first game mods.

Silas Warner died in 2004 after a long illness.
