= Helldorado (video game) =

2007 video game

- Developer(s): Spellbound Entertainment
- Publisher(s): GER: DTP Entertainment; NA: Viva Media
- Director(s): Jean-Marc Haessig
- Designer(s): Jean-Marc Haessig; Matthias Nock
- Programmer(s): Arno Wienholtz; Mark Novozhilov
- Artist(s): Serge Mandon
- Writer(s): Hans-Jörg Knabel; Jean-Marc Haessig
- Series: Desperados
- Platform(s): Microsoft Windows
- Release: GER: 25 May 2007; NA: 9 April 2009
- Genre(s): Real-time tactics
- Mode(s): Single-player

Helldorado is a real-time tactics video game. It is the spin-off/sequel to the 2006 game Desperados 2: Cooper's Revenge, continuing a plot development introduced in the final sequence of that game.

== Plot ==
Angel Face's widow kidnaps and poisons Doc McCoy, and unless John does some 'menial' tasks for her, she will leave McCoy to die. These menial tasks inevitably brand Cooper and his friends as criminals, since they involve robbing a bank and stealing a train full of U.S. Army weapons. While Cooper and his team are forced to perform the tasks, they discover that they - as is Mrs. Goodman - are mere pawns for a more dastardly plot: the Mexican revolutionary El Cortador's plan to assassinate Chester Alan Arthur, the President of the United States.

== Features ==
All six characters of Desperados 2 (John, Kate, Doc, Sam, Sánchez and Hawkeye) reappear in this game. This game features a new character system in which attacks are shown on the left side of HUD and characters are selected from a circular menu (similar to the backside of a revolver cylinder) in the bottom-left corner, unlike the portrait system on the bar used in the previous games.

Another new feature is the Combo System, in which two characters can combine their abilities for increased effectiveness. For example, Sam and Hawkeye can use the Missile combo, in which Sam attaches a piece of dynamite to one of Hawkeye's arrows to deliver its explosive power at long range. John and Sam can use the Brawler combo to beat every enemy in a selected area into submission. Sánchez can team up with either Kate or Hawkeye for a distraction, pretending that his partner is actually his prisoner.

== Reception ==
Reception

Aggregate score
Aggregator	Score
Metacritic	65/100

Helldorado holds a 65/100 aggregate score on Metacritic. IGN gave the game 5.7/10 criticizing its trial and error approach calling it "only for the hardcore strategy fan that has a massive reservoir of patience". GameSpot gave it 4.5/10, praising its huge levels but criticizing frustrating difficulty where a single mistake can cost the game.
