= Boosting (video games) =

Service to pay for improved video game status or rank

Boosting is a method by which low-ranked players in online multiplayer games, such as first-person shooters and massively multiplayer online role-playing games (MMORPGs), hire more skilled players to artificially increase their gaming account rank or winning positions. Boosting is rarely allowed as part of a game's terms of service, and while legal in most countries, boosted accounts are sometimes banned or reset if detected. In South Korea, it was declared a criminal offense in 2018, leading various companies to tighten their policies on it. The act of boosting negatively impacts game balance by allowing unskilled players to lower the quality of high-ranking play, making the game less viable and enjoyable. However, the extent of the crackdown on boosting has been debated, with some calling it not severe enough to merit criminal penalties.

== Player reasoning ==
MMORPGs fuse conventional sports competition concepts and fantasy themes, where two or more highly skilled gamers are pitted against each other. Typically, the winners are rewarded with a combination of experience items, points, and in-game currency, which can then be used to skip the unnecessary grind and spruce up characters. To foster competitive integrity during these Quests, video game publishers use modified Elo rating systems to mean and match players' skills, ensuring everyone competes on a level playing field.

In practice, when a player or team with a higher MMR (matchmaking rating) plays against a competitor with a lower MMR, the winner gains a few points from the loser. Meanwhile, if the lower MMR opponent wins, more points are deducted from the higher MMR loser and awarded to the winner.

Games may give in-game rewards to players with high MMRs. In Valorant, for example, well-performing players are rewarded with the coveted Radiant and Immortal ranks, which are displayed as badges of honor on their gaming accounts. In World of Warcraft, the Classic Honour System allows players to unlock titles and equipment at various ranks and earn PvP ranks based on the number of Honorable Kills in their weekly PvP contributions.

A player's rank can affect their ability to qualify for e-sport team selections and qualifying for e-sports tournaments. In 2021, for example, The E-sports Federation of India (ESFI) started publishing national rankings for various MMORPGs including Valorant, Call of Duty Mobile (Battle Royale), and FreeFire, which are used to field academy rosters.

Likewise, a combination of experience points, experience time, and in-game currency is important for players, as it carries an intrinsic social status within the online video gaming communities. A study by Tichon and Makaresz on the effects of MMORPGs on the social identities of players showed that most video gamers heavily identify with their gaming avatars and highly value their online reputation in their respective gaming communities.

Different MMORPGs feature different ecosystems, setups, and leagues, all of which require a unique set of skills. To skip the time-consuming and skill-intensive grind, while still remaining competitive, weak players often offload their gaming accounts to professional video gamers and video gaming services and websites, who help level up their characters and attain their desired rank for a fee.

== Types of boosting ==
According to German data gathering platform Statista, the global e-sports market was valued at $1.3 B in 2022, with revenues projected to surpass the $1.87 B mark by 2025. As the e-sports ecosystem becomes increasingly lucrative, the stakes keep rising, ultimately racking up the pressure on players. And since there are very few in-game mechanisms to skip the leveling-up grind and attain the desired rank, weak players result to using ELO boosting service providers to climb the ladder and ramp up their accounts.

Commercial Elo boosting can be divided into five primary categories:

Solo boosting. This boosting method entails a professional gamer logging onto the account of another gamer using a VPN and playing on their behalf. Both the pro gamer and the account owner enter into a contract obligation with the pro gamer to boost the account up to a desired rank or level. If the parties involved are located in different locations, the primary account holder relinquishes the login details of their account to the professional gamer.

Duo boosting. Also known as "queue boosting", this video game boosting method occurs in the form of the account owner playing alongside the professional booster. They can either play on behalf of the account owner in their gaming account or provide personal coaching services in real time. Duo queue boosting can also occur in the form of a highly ranked gamer losing to a low-ranked competitor intentionally to boost their rank due to the way the MMR (matchmaking rating) system works.

Placement matches boosting. This Elo boosting category entails hiring a professional gamer to give a new gaming account a positive head start. Placement matches are the first few games in a competitive playlist, and they are mainly used to gauge a player's skill level. On top of a higher starting rank, players who perform well in placement matches also receive unique rewards.

Win boosting. As the name suggests, win boosts entail a professional ELO booster winning a particular game on behalf of the account owner. This form of boosting is mainly used by amateur account owners struggling to win a particular video game.

In-game purchases. Although not necessarily boosting, in-game purchases are paid-for features and items that allow a gamer to advance more rapidly in the game. Today, it is one of the fastest-growing video gaming market segments, managing to surpass the $145 B mark in 2022. Depending on the video game, in-game purchases come in different forms including coins, special weapons, rare skins, extra lives, unlocking levels, etc.

== Commercial market ==
Although the true size of the commercial video game boosting industry remains largely unknown, a 2019 study by the University of Limerick estimated ELO boosting among the three most popular MMORPGs i.e. League of Legends, Overwatch, and Dota 2 to be $170 million. During the same period, the overall global e-sports revenue surpassed $1.2 billion, with projections indicating it hit the $1.87 B mark by 2025. A more recent study conducted in 2021 estimated the combined revenue generated by LoL, Overwatch, and DOTA boosting at $119 million, representing a 7% decline over a period of three years.

When asked in 2023 why he engages in boosting services, competitive Europe Nordic & East (EUNE) League of Legend player Chausa replied: "I can earn way more doing this than having a regular job."

A few years earlier in 2015, veteran Chinese League of Legends gamer, XiaoWeiXiao confessed to earning $1300 for boosting a friend's account to LoL's second-highest tier rank, which led to his suspension from the now defunct Team Impulse.

== Bans ==
Elo boosting is a controversial and divisive practice that is supported and condemned in equal measure by the video gaming community. On one hand, some players argue it goes against the spirit of gaming and should attract a permanent ban, while others believe it helps below-average players achieve their video gaming aspirations.

Today, the Elo boosting industry continues to operate in a grey area with no clear rules and regulations from video game providers and governments around the world. From a legal perspective, MMR boosting is legal everywhere in the world, except South Korea. According to the country's Game Industry Promotion Act, individuals and commercial entities are prohibited from offering paid services to level up a player's video gaming account, noting that it curtails a free, fair, and competitive ecosystem. Violating the Game Industry Promotion Act in South Korea attracts a $17,800 fine, a two-year jail term, or both.

Since the 2017 ban on MMR boosting in South Korea, several leading gaming providers have joined the country in distancing themselves from the ideals of Elo boosting by making it a bannable offense on their platforms. According to Riot Games' terms of service, for example, both the booster and the boostee risk a 2-week account suspension in League of Legends, a drop in Honor to level 0, exclusion from the weekly Ranked Rewards, and even a permanent ban from the game for second-time offenders.

Riot Games can also ban CS-GO and Valorant accounts caught engaging in MMR boosting, with the punishment varying with the severity of the offense. Respawn Entertainment and Electronic Arts, on the other hand, also expressly prohibit boosting/account sharing in Apex Legend, citing it goes against the games' Fair Play rules and TOS.

Notable professional video game outlaws who have been caught engaging in MMR boosting in the past include:

- Ryu Ho-jeong: In 2014, popular South Korean Twitch streamer turned politician, Ryu Ho-jeong, admitted to having boosted her League of Legends accounts. During this period, she was still serving as the president of "Klass Ewha", a well-known esports club at Ewha Womans University.
- XiaoWeiXiao: In 2015, veteran Chinese League of Legends gamer, XiaoWeiXiao confessed to earning $1300 for boosting a friend's account to LoL's second-highest tier rank while playing for his North American organization Team Impulse. Further investigation also revealed that Xiao had been in talks to sell an unlocked League of Legend Championship Series (LCS) account with access to all champions, a huge skins collection, and an XP boost. Consequently, he was declared ineligible to participate in all Riot-affiliated LoL competitions until February 2016.
- Jeong Sang-gil: Popularly known as "Apdo", this enigmatic League of Legends gamer is yet another prime example of a video gaming "outlaw" caught engaging in Elo boosting. Considered the king of macro play and one of the best solo-queue boosters in Korea, Jeong first appeared in Season 2 of LoL, where he gained notoriety for playing on championships such as Swain and curating gaming guides on Inven, Korea's equivalent of Reddit. In Season 3 of the game, he made his debut in the Challenger league of Korean soloque, and subsequently started flaunting and offering his ELO boosting services through multiple Smurf accounts. In 2014, an anonymous female gamer reported him for engaging in smurfing and Elo boosting, which were (and still are) prohibited by Riot Games. Eventually, Riot Korea banned Apdo's primary gaming account for 1,000 years, as well as revoked his participation in OGN LOL Champ Winter. In 2022, Jeong "Apdo" Sang-gil announced he was putting his full-streaming career on hold to join the compulsory military service.
- In 2021, Respawn Entertainment and Electronic Arts banned over 2,051 users for engaging in Elo boosting. Despite these bans, the practice is still prevalent as professional Apex Legends Xbox Predator players were caught boosting and teaming in their ranked matches in 2022.

Other inappropriate behaviors, including harassment, troll farms, or promoting fiery opponents, can also attract a ban, although it varies with the game provider.

=== MMORPGs that condone Elo-boosting ===
Although MMR boosting and selling in-game items for real-world cash attracts an almost compulsory ban across different video games, there are a select few that condone the practice. In FIFA, for example, players can use FIFA GOLD to select top players and even purchase advanced training programs for their teams.

Likewise, the in-game purchases in World of Warcraft can help weak players skip time-intensive and skill-testing Raids. Other popular video games that allow players to skip the grind in exchange for money include Guild Wars 2 (ArenaNet 2012) and Lost Ark (Tripod Studio and Smilegate 2022).

== Effects of MMR boosting services ==
Winning, gaming expertise, and general knowledge of video game content are valuable social currencies in the gaming community. For example, in 2019, Tyler "Ninja" Blevins made $17 million through brand endorsements, fees, and sponsorship due to his online following of Fortnite gamers. To earn these accolades, however, the rules of the game need to be fair, public, and enforced consistently. By hiring professional MMR boosters weak gaming accounts can take down players and teams with slightly better gaming skills, ultimately distorting the gear, point, and progression systems.

Video game boosting also erodes the matchmaking balance of a game. Matchmaking refers to the process of connecting and bundling players with similar gaming skills for online play sessions, where they can compete against each other. MMR boosting can upset this balance by placing unskilled players on teams expected to display competence, ultimately dropping the team's overall rating. Similarly, placing highly skilled players against mediocre teams can lead to domination of the game by their stronger, more experienced counterparts.

Video game boosting can throw off in-game virtual economies by giving the boosted players an undue advantage over low-ranked players. This mainly occurs in the form of unlocking higher tiers of content, which offer more direct virtual currency and better in-game items.

== Combating commercial MMR boosting services ==
As the e-sports industry continues to evolve and expand, different game providers have developed unique ways to combat cheating practices like bots, cheat codes, accounts selling, and virtual items trading. In 2003, Battlefield 1942 incorporated special tools such as nProtect GameGuard, Valve Anti-Cheat, and PunkBuster to counter cheating exploits within the game. Riot Games followed suit in 2015 by banning the sale of virtual content and the use of performance-altering software or bots.

Unlike these run-off-the-mill cheating practices, however, MMR boosting is fairly difficult to detect since players don't need to use external software, and can only be reported by players involved in the game.

In 2021, Blizzard Entertainment co-chief Mike Ybarra came under heavy criticism for promoting his guild raid, which included the sale of Heroic Sanctum of Domination boosting run in World of Warcraft: Shadowlands. Raid boosting encourages highly skilled players to carry their weak counterparts through high-end raids in exchange for in-game items and gold. In 2022, the company imposed a ban against selling carries or boosting services, as well as the sale of in-game items for real world money. Players found violating these new policies risk temporary suspension or a complete ban from playing the game.

To counter boosting tendencies and some of its offshoot exploits, video game providers have continued to develop dedicated systems to detect MMR boosting. Riots Games, for instance, uses the ELO rating system to profile and bundle opponents with the same skills and VPN change detection systems to detect multiple account logins from different countries.

Rank decay is a system used to downgrade a player's competitive tier and division after spending extended periods without participating in competitive matches.
