= Rising Storm =

(The) Rising Storm may refer to:

- The Rising Storm (band), an American rock band
- Rising Storm (novel), a fantasy novel written under the pen name Erin Hunter
- Rising Storm (video game), a stand-alone expansion pack to Red Orchestra 2: Heroes of Stalingrad
  - Rising Storm 2: Vietnam
- Star Wars: The Rising Storm, a novel by Cavan Scott

== See also ==
- Storm Rising, a 1995 fantasy novel by Mercedes Lackey
