= RS2 =

RS2 may refer to:

- Audi RS 2 Avant, high-performance estate car/station wagon, jointly developed by Audi and Porsche
- ALCO RS-2, a diesel-electric locomotive built by Alco-GE
- Rising Storm 2: Vietnam, a tactical first-person shooter video game set in the Vietnam War, sequel to Rising Storm
- "RuneScape 2", an older version of the online video game RuneScape
- Romancing SaGa 2, role-playing video game
- Red Steel 2, a 2010 first-person action game
- "Redstone 2", codename of the Windows 10 Creators Update, released April 2017
- RS2, an album by Canadian bass guitarist and singer-songwriter Rhonda Smith
- The second Randall–Sundrum model

== See also ==
- RSRS
- RSS (disambiguation)
- RS (disambiguation)
