= Darkest Hour: Europe '44-'45 =

- Developer: Darklight Games
- Engine: Unreal Engine 2.5
- Platforms: Microsoft Windows, Linux
- Release: June 6, 2008; 18 years ago
- Genre: Tactical first-person shooter
- Mode: Multiplayer

Darkest Hour: Europe '44-'45 is a multiplayer realism-based tactical first-person shooter video game developed by Darklight Games as a free modification for Tripwire Interactive's Red Orchestra: Ostfront 41-45. Originally set on the Western Front of World War II, the game has seen continuous development since its initial release in 2008 and now spans across the European Theater of the war. It depicts authentic locations from historic battles such as the Battle of Stalingrad, Operation Citadel, Invasion of Sicily, Normandy Landings, Operation Market Garden, Operation Bagration and more, as well as multiple playable factions including American, British, Canadian, Polish, German and Italian forces with a focus on realistic weapons, vehicles and units.

== Gameplay ==
Axis player wielding a K98k rifle on the Stoumont map

Player driving a Higgins boat (LCVP) on the Dog Green map

Darkest Hour's gameplay style is similar to its parent game, Red Orchestra: Ostfront 41-45, although with many expansive changes especially to the armor system, have many features such as the round shatter, overmatch, the ability to break the traverse of the turret, optics, kill tank crew with a penetrating shot, different ammunition types such as armour-piercing discarding sabot (APDS), armour-piercing ammunition (AP, or HVAP), and high-explosive anti-tank (HEAT), tank brew ups and many other features not in the original game.

Players assume the role of an individual infantryman or tank crew from either the Allied or Axis forces in an online multiplayer environment. Each team then attempts to accomplish objectives varying by the historical battle the game map is based on. The main type of play consists of an attack and defend style, whereby one team must take objective areas from the opposing team to claim victory.

The game features significantly more content than its parent in the form of entirely new battlegrounds, vehicles, weapons and uniforms. The Allied team players get the chance to play the role of an American, British, Canadian, Polish or Soviet soldier, while the Axis team play as a soldier from various units of the Wehrmacht, Waffen SS or part of the fascist Italian Regio Esercito.

Over 20 World War II era firearms can be used including the M1 Garand, M1 Carbine, .30-cal, Bren LMG, FG 42, Thompson, Lee–Enfield, American Bazooka, British PIAT and German Panzerschreck. Crewable vehicles include the King Tiger, Jagdpanther, Sherman, Cromwell, M10 Wolverine and Kübelwagen.

Other new improvements have been made to increase gameplay realism, such as bullet suppression, wall mantling, supersonic cracks, shell shock, deployable mortars, player/vehicle damage, and a playable radioman class required for calling in artillery strikes.

== Battle Locations ==
Maps available include:

- Juno Beach – Canadians storming the beach in D-Day-style action.
- Carentan – The US 101st Airborne assaults the town shortly after D-Day.
- Brecourt – 101st Airborne tries to disable a key German artillery battery behind the beaches.
- Vieux – Vast, sweeping armored combat as the British attempt to break out during Operation Goodwood in Normandy.
- Ginkel Heath (near Ede, Netherlands) – British paratroopers drop into a hotly contested landing zone at the start of Operation Market-Garden.
- Wacht-am-Rhein – German armor attempts to seize critical roadways from an American armored unit in the opening hours of the Ardennes Offensive.
- Stoumont – American infantry and armor try to hold back SS PanzerGrenadiers in the streets of a demolished Ardennes town.
- Bois Jacques – Americans in trench-style defense against a combined German tank and infantry force in the forests between Bastogne and Foy, Belgium.
- Foy – German forces defend against attacking American Airborne troopers deep in the Ardennes.
- Noville -
- DogGreen - D-Day 0600hrs - Omaha Beach: Dog Green Sector
- Raids - A British Airborne unit, backed by Cromwell tanks, attempts to take a French town from dug in German troops.
- La Monderie - This is a fictional tank battle taking place in September 1944 somewhere in the country side of France.
- Freyneux and Lamormenil - This map closely models the actual terrain of the Freyneux-Lamormenil area of Belgium in December 1944.
- La Chapelle - US infantry forces supported by a section of tanks must seize the village from a German infantry force.
- Hurtgenwald - While the Hurtgen Forest attracts tourists today because of its forested hills, lakes, and rivers, in 1944 and 1945 it was the site of one of the longest, bloodiest battles in U.S. Army history.
- Vieux Recon - Commonwealth reconnaissance forces run into their German counterparts just north of Caen in the early dawn hours.
- Carentan Causeway
- Cambes-en-Plaine - British armor encounters elements of the 12.SS Panzer Division on D-Day +1.
- Caen
- Poteau Ambush - Kamfgruppe Hansen of the 1.SS Leibstandarte ambush a convoy of the American 14th Cavalry Group.
- Hill 108
- Hill 400
- Kommerscheidt
- Simonskall
- Lutremange
- Bridge Head
- Gran
- Battle of Gela - Landings by the US 1st Infantry Division at the Sicilian coastal town of Gela during the Invasion of Sicily.

== History ==
Game development began in November 2006. First public release occurred on June 6, 2008 as Darkest Hour: Normandy 1944 (to coincide with the 64th anniversary of D-Day). The original Darkest Hour development team, known as Darklight Games, amassed dozens of contributors before the first release. For the subsequent second and third releases, the full team was downsized to "provide an efficient core team of multi-skill leads with a network of contributors who help whenever they can".

After several members of the original development group departed following the second release, the Darklight name was dropped in favor of the more general, Darkest Hour Team. To reach a broader audience, this consolidated group, composed of remaining original team members along with new talent, produced a substantially overhauled version of the game culminating in an acclaimed re-release through Steam in June 2009 under its current title, Darkest Hour: Europe '44-45.

Following the release of the 5.1 update in December, 2011, several members of the original development team split off to found Antimatter Games and began work on an expansion for Red Orchestra 2: Heroes of Stalingrad called Rising Storm, while others founded Jackboot Games and began development on a now defunct sequel to Darkest Hour known as Festung Europa.

In 2014, Darklight Games was reconstituted by several members of the previous development team and work on the game was resumed. The first major update in 4 years, 6.0, was released in December 2015 and the game saw a resurgence in popularity. The team at Darklight Games continued to expand and regular updates to the game continued. In 2016, a new major update was released which officially introduced the Eastern Front into the game, with the Soviet Union becoming a playable faction with unique weapons, vehicles and maps. This was followed in 2018 by the largest update to the game's mechanics since its inception with the "Rally Up!" update which introduced several new game modes "Advance" and "Clash", as well as a new squad system which allowed players to better organize, communicate and coordinate with each other and finally a logistics system which brought with it the ability for players to build defenses, anti-tank guns, ammunition depots, spawn points and other constructions to facilitate more dynamic gameplay.

Finally, building on the renewed popularity of the mod, the Darklight Games team continued to expand and development began on the game's largest content expansion in history, the addition of the Sicilian Theater of World War II. Released on July 11th, 2025, the 12.0 update brought with it a brand new full-featured faction, the Kingdom of Italy's Regio Esercito, with unique character models, professional voice acting, 10 new weapons, 6 new vehicles and 5 maps representing the Invasion of Sicily.

== Reception ==
Darkest Hour made it into Mod DB's top 100 unreleased mods of 2007. Egames.de, a prominent German gaming website, featured the game on its release.
