= Heroes of the West =

Heroes of the West may refer to:

- Heroes of the West (1932 film), an American Western serial
- Heroes of the West (1965 film), an Italian Spaghetti Western
- Heroes of the West (Red Orchestra 2 mod), a modification for the video game Red Orchestra 2
