= Cheating in online games =

Practice of subverting video game rules or mechanics to gain an unfair advantage

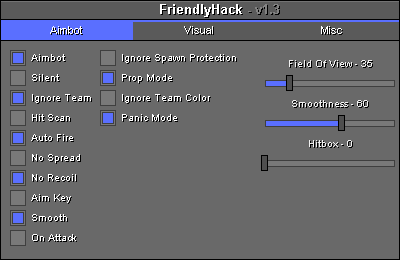
A video game cheat menu

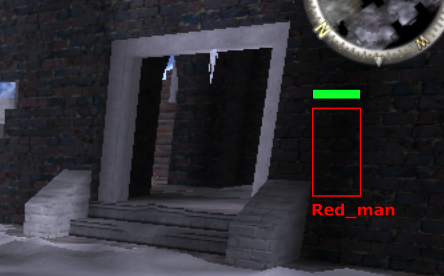
Typical extrasensory perception (ESP) cheat showing the health, name and bounding box of a character that is otherwise invisible

On online games, cheating subverts the rules or mechanics of the games to gain an unfair advantage over other players, generally with the use of third-party software. What constitutes cheating is dependent on the game involved, its rules, and consensus opinion as to whether a particular activity is considered to be cheating.

Cheating is present in most multiplayer online games, but it is difficult to measure. Various methods of cheating in online games can take the form of software assistance, such as scripts and bots, and various forms of unsporting play taking advantage of exploits or glitches within the game. The Internet and darknets can provide players with the methodology necessary to cheat in online games, with software often available for purchase.

As methods of cheating have advanced, video game publishers have similarly improved methods of anti-cheating, but are still limited in their effectiveness. Punishments for cheaters also have various forms, with legal measures also being taken against those who create or use cheats. While some countries include laws that prohibit and punish cheating, video game companies have a history of citing copyright infringement in lawsuits against cheaters.

== Bots and software assistance ==
=== Aimbots and triggerbots ===
An aimbot or autoaim is a type of computer game bot most commonly used in first-person shooter games to provide varying levels of automated target acquisition and calibration to the player. They are sometimes used along with a triggerbot, which automatically shoots when an opponent appears within the field-of-view or aiming reticule of the player.

Aimbotting relies on each player's client computer receiving information about all other players, whether they are visible from the player's position or not. Targeting is a matter of determining the location of any opponent relative to the player's location and pointing the player's weapon at the target. This targeting works regardless of whether the opponent is behind walls or too far away to be seen directly.

Some servers allow inactive players to spectate, watching the game from the viewpoints of the active players. Recording of gameplay actions is also often possible. If someone was using a targeting aimbot, the bot would be obvious to the spectator as unnatural exact position tracking. Some aimbots and triggerbots attempt to hide from spectators the fact they are being used through a number of methods, such as delaying firing to hide the fact it shoots the instant an opponent is in the cheater's crosshair. Some triggerbot programs can be easily toggled on and off using the mouse or keyboard.

Cheat suites may incorporate these in addition to other features, including adjustments to extrasensory perception, move speed, ammo count, and player radar. Neophytes may colloquially define these suites as aimbot programs.

=== Artificial lag/lag switch ===
In the peer-to-peer gaming model, lagging is what happens when the stream of data between one or more players gets slowed or interrupted, causing movement to stutter and making opponents appear to behave erratically. By using a lag switch, a player is able to disrupt uploads from the client to the server, while their own client queues up the actions performed. The goal is to gain advantage over another player without reciprocation; opponents slow down or stop moving, allowing the lag switch user to easily outmaneuver them. From the opponent's perspective, the player using the device may appear to be teleporting, invisible or invincible, while the opponents suffer delayed animations and fast-forwarded game play, delivered in bursts. Some gaming communities refer to this method as "tapping" which refers to the users "tapping" on and off their internet connection to create the lag.

The term "lag switch" encompasses many methods of disrupting the network communication between a client and its server. One method is by attaching a physical device, called a hardware lag switch, to a standard Ethernet cable. By flipping the switch on and off, the physical connection between the client and the server is disrupted. The designers of video game console hardware have started to introduce built-in protection against lag switches in the form of voltage detectors, which detect a change in voltage when the switch is flipped. Some manufacturers have taken counter measures to bypass or trick this detector. This can also be achieved by simply unplugging the Ethernet cord going to the client, causing a disruption in the player's internet connection. Other methods, called a software or wireless lag switch, involve using a computer program. In this method, the cheater runs an application on a computer connected to the same network as the client. The application hogs the network bandwidth, disrupting the communication between the client and its server. However, one cannot do this for an unlimited amount of time. At some point, if no traffic is being received, most game clients and/or game servers will decide that the connection has been lost and will remove the player from the game. In some P2P games, it can result in all players lagging or being disconnected from the game.

Simpler methods are firewall or router rules that apply bandwidth shaping and network latency, a cheat is able to adjust limits on both bandwidth and latency to stay relevant to a P2P network yet have considerable advantage over other players.

=== Look-ahead ===
Look-ahead cheating is a method of cheating within a peer-to-peer multiplayer gaming architecture where the cheating client gains an unfair advantage by delaying their actions to see what other players do before announcing its own action.

A client can cheat using this method by acting as if it is suffering from high latency; the outgoing packet is forged by attaching a time-stamp that is prior to the actual moment the packet is sent, thereby fooling other clients into thinking that the action was sent at the correct time, but was delayed in arrival. A partial solution is the lockstep protocol.

=== World-hacking ===
World-hacking is a method or third-party program that enables a user to exploit bugs and to view more of a level than intended by the developer.

A common aspect of real-time strategy games is the player's partial limitation or complete inability to see beyond the visibility range of individual game objects that are under their ownership (typically units and structures); this concept is controlled by a mechanism known as the fog of war. World-hacking usually enables the user to bypass this mechanism, either by removing it entirely and/or by rendering objects through the fog that would not normally be visible. In multiplayer modes, this allows for a distinct advantage against the other players who are subject to the intended settings. The advantage gained can be substantial, especially for the average real-time strategy games that rely on the rock paper scissors dynamic to balance out individual objects' varying strengths and weaknesses.

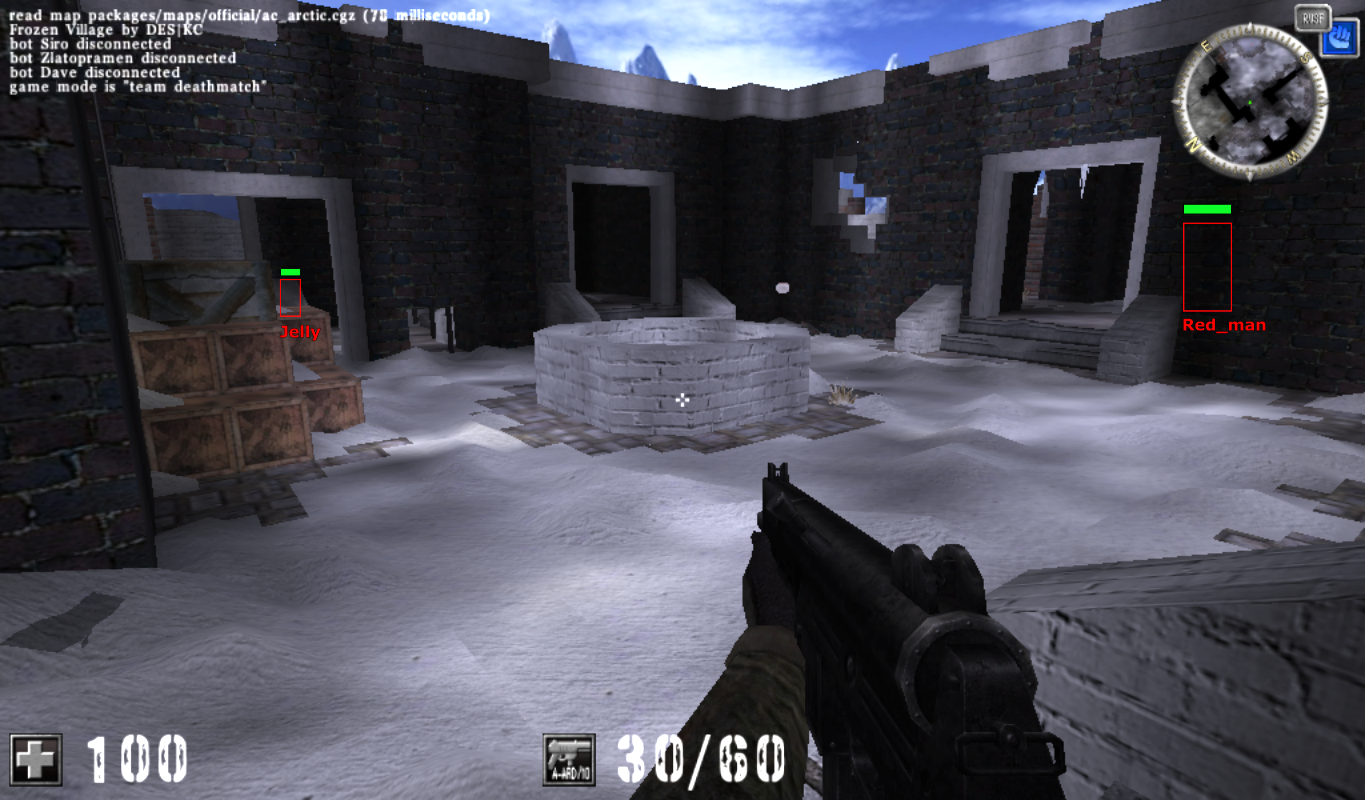
Wallhacking in AssaultCube, where players concealed in the corridors to the left and right are indicated with red rectangles

World-hacking may also allow a player to see through solid or opaque objects and/or manipulate or remove textures, to know in advance when an opponent is about to come into targeting range from an occluded area. This can be done by making wall textures transparent, or modifying the game maps to insert polygonal holes into otherwise solid walls. This variation is commonly known as a "wallhack" since it basically allows to the player to see enemies through walls. (The term wallhack has since generalized to mean all forms of hacking that produce visual information, also known as extrasensory perception (ESP).)

World-hacking relies on the fact that an FPS server usually sends raw positional information for all players in the game, and leaves it up to the client's 3D renderer to hide opponents behind walls, in plant foliage, or in dark shadows. If the game map rendering could be turned off completely, all players could be seen moving around in what appears to be empty space. Complete map hiding offers no advantage to a cheater as they would be unable to navigate the invisible map pathways and obstacles. However, if only certain surfaces are made transparent or removed, this leaves just enough of an outline of the world to allow the cheater still to navigate it easily.

In the context of mobile gaming, world-hacking has evolved to exploit the Unity engine's rendering pipeline. On platforms like Android, third-party software for Standoff 2 utilizes shader modification (Chams) and library hooking to bypass occluded geometry, providing real-time visual advantages.

Asus released wireframe display drivers in 2001 that enabled players to use wallhacks, announcing the settings as "special weapons" that users could employ in multiplayer games. In a poll by the Online Gamers Association, 90% of its members were against the release of the drivers.

== Unsporting play ==
=== Boosting ===
Players will set up multiple accounts to play against each other. Usually, the primary account will be allowed to win through a deliberate lack of resistance from the secondary account(s) due to those accounts being unplayed or those players agreeing to lose. Some players will reverse roles between games, giving each account an equal win–loss record.

=== Disconnecting ===
In games where wins and losses are recorded on a player's account, a player may disconnect when they are about to lose in order to prevent that loss from being recorded. This is usually done by activating known in-game glitches or through third-party sources via "IP booting" (a feature of firewall software). Some players do this if they feel their opponent is being unfair. Some games implement a disconnection penalty, usually by recording the disconnect as a loss, a deduction of experience, or even Elo points. Certain games also have a 'disconnect delay' period before the player can disconnect that can last 10–30 seconds. This prevents a player from instantly disconnecting if they are about to die or lose. In some games, if a player disconnects they can receive a warning or even get locked out of online play for a short period.

=== Rapid Fire Modifications (Macros) ===
In many games, weapons can be fired in burst fire or single shot fire modes. Modifying a controller or keyboard/mouse to gain the advantage of having a faster firing weapon than the standard player can be considered a method of cheating. These modifications can create an imbalance within the game. In addition to modifying a console or its controller, it is possible to achieve a similar effect on the PC by binding the firing button to the scroll wheel of a mouse, or by using a macro setting that will simulate rapid key presses automatically. However, most games limit the rate at which weapons can be fired, regardless of how fast a player presses the button, in order to limit this form of cheating.

=== Exploits ===
Exploiting is the application of an unintended feature or bug that gives the player an advantage not intended by the game design. Exploiting is generally considered cheating by the gaming community at large due to the unfair advantage usually gained by the exploiter. Most software developers of online games prohibit exploiting in their terms of service and often issue sanctions against players found to be exploiting. There is some contention by exploiters that exploiting should not be considered cheating as it is merely taking advantage of actions allowed by the software. Some players view exploiting as a skill because certain exploits take a significant amount of time to find, or dexterity and timing to use.

=== Farming ===
The term farming may refer to the practice of garnering achievements or virtual property for the purpose of real-money-trading. With rare exception, this has no direct effect on the gaming experience of other players; instead, it is a violation of most EULAs and could devalue the virtual property being farmed.

=== Twinking ===
Twinking is the act of transferring gear intended for higher level characters to lower level characters that would be incapable of obtaining the gear on their own. Twinked characters have a huge advantage over non-twinked characters, as well as the rest of the game world. This is usually used by players who wish to create a new character, either to help them level more rapidly or to gain an unfair advantage in PvP (i.e. player versus player, a type of multiplayer interactive conflict). Most MMORPGs tolerate it, provided that the twinked character is not used in PvP combat against non-twinked characters. Often limits on twinking are placed into the game, usually through strict level or stat requirements to equip the item. Circumventing these level requirements would then be further cheating.

=== Ghosting ===
Most games allow other participants to observe the game as it is played from a variety of perspectives; depending on the game, perspectives allow an observer a map overview or attach a "camera" to the movement of a specific player. In doing so, the observer can communicate with an accomplice using a secondary communication methodology (in-game private message, third party communication, or even off-line) to inform friendly players of traps or the position of opponents. An observer can be an active player, using a separate computer, connection and account.

Some systems prevent inactive players from observing the game if they are on the same IP address as an active player, on the grounds that they are probably in close physical proximity; when all players from a single IP address are no longer active participants, they are all allowed to observe. However, this restriction can be easily evaded if there are multiple IP addresses available at one location (a common feature of broadband subscriptions), or if the observer installs remote desktop software on their computer, thus enabling their computer screen to be viewed by select other players in real time.

Additionally, this may be used against players livestreaming to platforms like Twitch to observe the player and their team's position and stats. This is often referred to as stream sniping.

=== Stacking ===
Stacking involves altering game settings or team lineups to give one or more teams an unfair advantage over others. One example includes arranging a team composed of skilled or professional players against a team with members of lesser skill. Less ethical rigging involves weighting the game by providing a player or team with an advantage by outfitting them with better (or more familiar) weapons or equipment, or creating a play field that caters to a certain player, team or playing style. Many games prevent this by preventing players from joining a team with more players than the opposing side, forcing newcomers to balance the teams.

=== Scripting ===
Scripting is the use of a program or game feature to automate certain actions or behaviors. The use of scripts may or may not be considered cheating, depending on the behavior involved, and whether said behaviour is replicable without the use of such script. A script may give the user unusually fast firing rate, unobtainable otherwise, or may perform seemingly trivial tasks such as reloading. Some scripts can also tamper with other players' systems by spoofing commands.

=== The "Shadow" PC ===
The cheat does not actually run on the gaming computer. Instead, the DMA card sends the game's memory data to a second computer via a cable.

== Implementation of cheats ==
In the client–server model, the server is responsible for information security and enforcing game rules. (See "Anti-cheating methods and limitations" below for drawbacks.) In the peer-to-peer gaming model, clients run equal code but are still subject to most of the same type of cheats found in the client–server multiplayer model; however, the peer-to-peer multiplayer model has been deprecated in favor of the client–server model with the wider adoption of high-speed networks.

"Never trust the client" is a maxim among game developers (as well as other developers) that summarizes the model of client–server game design. It means that no information sent from a client should be accepted by a server if it breaks the game rules or the basic mechanics of the game, and that no information should be sent to a client unless it is "need-to-know." For example, a server with no rule enforcement or data integrity checking will synchronize all of the clients with all of the information about all of the other clients. The server will be very fast, but any wallhack program will reveal where all the players in the game are, what team they are on, and what state they are in — health, weapon, ammo etc. At the same time, altered and erroneous data from a client will allow a player to break the game rules, manipulate the server, and even manipulate other clients.

=== Game code modification ===
Many cheats are implemented by modifying and hooking code at runtime. There are two types of cheats implemented in this manner, internal and external. The principal difference between the two is how they interact with the game process. Internal cheats inject their code into the process, commonly via DLL injection, which allows them to read and write the process's entire address space and hook internal functions. On the other hand, external cheats run in a separate process with their own address space, and use the operating system's memory read/write primitives (such as ReadProcessMemory on Microsoft Windows) to modify the process's memory.

=== System software modification ===
Rather than modifying the game code (which the game itself or a 3rd-party protection system may detect), some cheats modify underlying system components. An example of this is graphics driver modifications that ignore depth checking and draw all objects on the screen—a primitive wallhack. System or driver modification is harder to detect, as there are a large number of system drivers that differ from user to user.

=== Packet interception and manipulation ===
The security of game software can be circumvented by intercepting and/or manipulating data (divided into "packets") in real-time while in transit from the client to the server or vice versa (i.e. a man-in-the-middle attack). Interception can be passive or result in active manipulation; either method can be performed on the client machine itself or via an external communication proxy; some aimbots incorporate this method.

=== Third-party hardware peripherals ===
==== Input hacking ====
Some computer and console devices sold under the guise of "accessibility peripherals" have been used to gain unfair advantages over other players of games, such as eliminating recoil completely and boosting aim assistance, and some may even include additionally downloadable macros.

Some games use different pools for matchmaking purposes, for instance, PC players are matched with other PC players, and console players are matched with other console players. A console peripheral allowing the use of mouse and keyboard can be used to trick the console system to provide additional aim assistance provided to controllers.

==== DMA hacking ====
More sophisticated online video game cheaters use specialized DMA attack cards to access a game's memory, providing features such as seeing through walls. This method uses a second computer to analyze the memory dump without requiring any software modification on the computer that a game is running on, making it much harder to detect than conventional cheats. A mouse-emulator can then automatically aim and fire, implementing an aimbot. Delta Force is notorious for its tug-of-war between cheaters and Anti-Cheat Expert developers.

== Anti-cheating methods and limitations ==
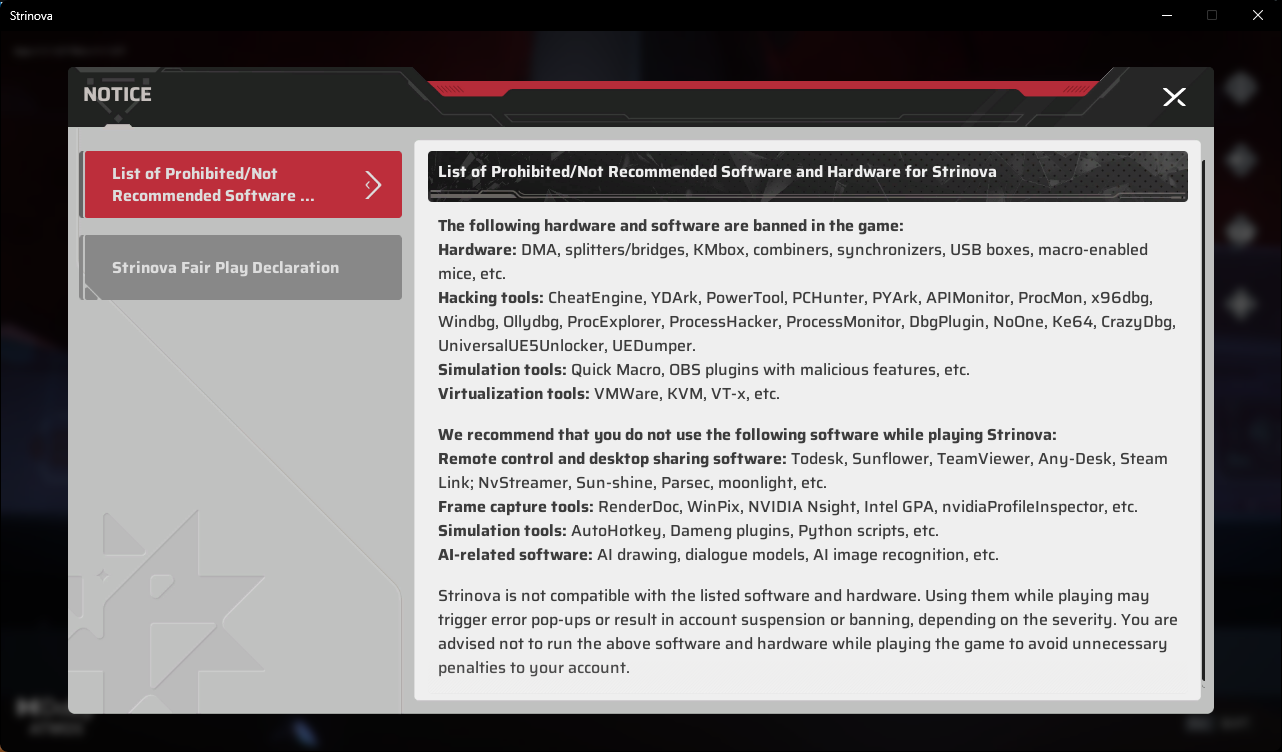
Most competitive multiplayer games prohibit third-party software that can give an unfair advantage, such as macro software.

There are many facets of cheating in online games which make the creation of a system to stop cheating very difficult; however, game developers and third-party software developers have created or are developing technologies that attempt to prevent cheating. Such countermeasures are commonly used in video games, with notable anti-cheat software being BattlEye, GameGuard, PunkBuster, Valve Anti-Cheat (specifically used on games on the Steam platform), and EasyAntiCheat.

=== Authoritative and mirrored server design ===
Generally, the better the server is at enforcing the rules, the less of a problem cheating will be in the game. In this approach, all client functionality either runs purely on the game server or alternatively the game server mirrors the client gameplay and continuously validates the game state. In many mobile games, it is a common practice to run the client game sessions synchronously on the server, using exactly the same user input. The client session is reset when the game sessions become unsynced, thereby preventing cheating.

Server-side game code makes a trade-off between calculating and sending results for display on a just-in-time basis or trusting the client to calculate and display the results in appropriate sequence as a player progresses. It can do this by sending the parts of the world state needed for immediate display, which can result in client lag under bandwidth constraints, or sending the player the entire world state, which results in faster display for the player under the same bandwidth constraints, but exposes that data to interception or manipulation —— a trade-off between security and efficiency.

When game servers were restricted by limited available resources such as storage, memory, internal bandwidth, and computational capacity due to the technologies available and the cost of the hardware, coupled with internet connections that were slow, it was believed to be necessary to compromise on security for optimization to minimize the impact on the end-user. Today however, with the increased speed and power of multi-core computers, lower-priced hardware, and the increased availability of broadband internet, this has become less of an issue.

=== Software obfuscation ===
Additionally to storing data in non-standard formats, some games also utilize runtime protection through software protectors. The key target is to keep attackers from directly inspecting or modifying compiled software. Protectors utilize any of three methods to protect software.

Encryption solutions will encrypt the code instructions and typically use a multi–layered defense mechanism against any reversing or tampering attempts that target the decryption code directly. Most protection systems in this category encrypt the code and then decrypt it at the application's startup or during runtime. This is the moment at which an attacker will breakpoint, reverse, and inject custom code. Runtime decryption may also add significant processing overhead and lower the game's framerate. Alternatively, some solutions focus on obfuscating the code by inserting jump statements and seemingly random instruction paths. The final and strongest alternative is virtualization. In this approach the encrypted code runs on a virtual CPU that can be markedly different from generic x86 and x64 CPUs as the instruction set can be unique for each protected file.

The shared weakness of protectors and virtualizers is that they impact performance, either by requiring decryption or by introducing unnecessary CPU instructions. To reduce the overhead, code virtualizers are often only used to secure the critical parts of the code base, such as those interfacing with the game state and rendering.

=== Player supervision ===
Spectator functionality can allow server administrators to monitor individual players and thereby determine whether or not a cheat is in place. One risk of the spectator mode is that in competitive matches the spectator could abuse the mode for spying on specific players and communicating player positions and tactics to the opposing team. Some games get around this limitation by not allowing spectator mode at all, or by delaying the video feed.

Some games have systemized player supervision by allowing the community to review reports of disruptive behavior, determine whether those reports are valid, and apply temporary bans if appropriate. Reports can include data such as screenshots, videos, and chatlogs.

=== Anomaly detection ===
Anomalies in player behavior can be detected by statistically analyzing game events sent by the client to the server. The benefit is that this anti–cheat method is non–intrusive to the player's privacy and guaranteed to work on all end–user system configurations. The restriction of this method is that it cannot always be clear whether or not a player is cheating. Highly skilled players can for example develop such a map sense that they may end up being flagged for the use of a wallhack and/or aimbot. On the other hand, players may also cheat in a way that is under the detection thresholds and remain uncaught.

To reduce the amount of false positives, statistical detection systems are often combined with a supervision system that either is community driven or managed by a professional administrator team. In such implementations unusual player behavior can trigger a client-side component to create and upload reports for review.

=== Pattern detection ===
Pattern detection systems scan the player's hard drives and system memory for known cheat code or programs. Compared to statistical detection, the key advantage is that the subtle cheaters are also detected. Other than this, a pure pattern detection approach generally has few advantages. Experience has shown that keeping detection-based systems up to date is relatively slow and labor-intensive as one needs to constantly track down cheats and update detection patterns. End–users may also be concerned with privacy issues, such as has been the case with VAC (Valve Anti-Cheat) accessing browsing history.

=== Sandboxing ===
Sandboxing a software process can protect against potentially malicious actions such as code injection and memory modifications that would otherwise tamper with the game. One of the key benefits of sandboxing is that it can effectively prevent the underlying cheat mechanisms from working, and thereby can avoid the need for banning game community members as cheats simply do not work. Additionally, strong prevention mechanisms can stop many game hackers from targeting the game because of elevated skill requirements. Compared to pattern detection systems, sandboxing is generally not privacy invasive, as the approach requires no data to be uploaded to foreign back-end systems.

=== System incompatibility ===
Anti-cheat software commonly use low-level system interfaces not intended by the OS vendor for public use. As a result, they are a common source of incompatibilities with newer versions of operating systems and security measures as well as alternative OS API implementations such as Wine. For example, Windows enables Hypervisor-protected Code Integrity (HVCI) by default in every market except Chinese and Korean installations due to anti-cheat compatibility issues.

=== Third-party hardware detection ===
With the additional scrutiny directed towards the rising popularity of the third-party peripherals being used to gain unfair advantages in competitive games, game developers such as Bungie and Activision started cracking down on the users of these peripherals, with Activision updating its RICOCHET cheat detection software to detect such devices, while Bungie has just announced that while they are fine with using peripherals for the sake of genuine accessibility, they are ready to take countermeasures if they detect players using these devices to gain unfair advantages.

== Penalties for cheating ==
Game publishers can implement a wide array of consequences for cheating players.

=== Banning players ===
Some game publishers may decide to try to permanently ban players who are persistent in cheating and disrupting the game community. Such bans are typically placed based on hardware ID or IP address. Consequently, cheaters may develop ways of getting around these bans, by either playing through proxy or VPN servers, or spoofing or changing their hardware configuration.

Some companies and leagues ban suspected cheaters by blacklisting specific installation or serial keys, or user accounts, meaning that the player is effectively prevented from playing the game online. Certain games are known to identify cheaters and "shadow ban" them by placing them in matchmaking with other cheaters only, so as not to let the cheaters know that they have been identified.

While game publishers are known to ban players employing cheats, the actual number of players banned is usually not revealed. Exceptions to this include Blizzard Entertainment, Nexon, and CipSoft, known for banning cheaters in batches, and publicising the number of banned accounts, presumably in order to discourage others from cheating.

=== Suspension ===
In some cases a ban may not be permanent and will expire after a certain period of time. Suspensions are commonly used as a punitive measure for abuse of game glitches, harassing players, or benefiting from hacks, and to discourage further violation of rules unless the user receive a permanent ban. Temporary bans may also be utilized in case a violation cannot be fully proven, as is common with anti-cheating methods based on supervision or statistical detection.

=== In-game kick ===
In general kicking is perceived as a mild punishment, serving as a warning for the player in question. Some anti-cheat systems may decide to kick players out of a game server when the system integrity cannot be enforced nor be determined with certainty. Other anti-cheat methods may also utilize kicks as an instant punishment for presumably unfair game play behavior.

Some games may also provide the community with the option of voting for particular players to be kicked. Even though vote kicking brings many benefits, it may also serve as a tool for trolling or griefing by allowing for legitimate players to be removed out of the game through the voting process.

=== Demotion ===
When a violation is the result of farming or stat-padding, it may be too severe of a punishment to suspend or ban players. Some games, therefore, implement a system of demotion in which the offender is moved to a lower rank (demoting), the opposite of a promotion.

=== Progress-removal ===
In several games where points are used, if a player is caught cheating they will get their score reset to the base value that is applied when a new player joins the server.

== Legal measures ==
In recent years, countries including South Korea and China have criminalized the sale or use of cheats in video games. In South Korea, cheaters could be punished with up to 5 years in jail or fines exceeding $40,000. The presence of cheaters in online games may push away the legitimate playerbase and reduce overall profits in the industry, leading to game developers working with legislative bodies or enforcement agencies.

Historically, some game companies have also taken legal measures against individuals that have created and sold cheating tools in video games as a means to curb their use. Anti-cheat experts have argued that it is particularly important to take legal steps against entities who profit from making and selling cheats. In April 2013, coder DrUnKeN ChEeTaH was sued by Nexon America for operating GameAnarchy, a popular subscription based cheat provider for Combat Arms, and lost, Nexon being awarded $1.4 million in damages. In January 2017, Riot Games successfully sued the LeagueSharp service, which offered a subscription-based hacking service for Riot's League of Legends, with a $10 million award to be paid to Riot. Blizzard Entertainment sued Bossland GMBH for distributing software hacks for several of its games, and was awarded $8.5 million in damages. Epic Games, producers of the battle royale game Fortnite have sued two cheaters partnered with AddictedCheats, who offer cheating services for a variety of online games. Bungie had sued AimJunkies for cheats related to Destiny 2. Parts of their claims were settled via arbitration with Bungie being awarded $4.3 million, but a jury trial found for Bungie on copyright infringement claims, and while Bungie was awarded around $60,000 based on revenue made by AimJunkies, it was the first time that a jury trial had ruled on cheat software for video games, potentially setting future case law for further challenges.

Often, game company lawsuits against cheaters or cheat providers cite copyright infringement as the reason for the lawsuit. While some argue against the merit of this claim, grounds for copyright infringement include damaging the company's intellectual property, affecting the experience of other users, and circumventing the Digital Millennium Copyright Act (DMCA), which could be applied to video games.

== See also ==
- Cheating in esports
- Cheating in video games
- Gaming etiquette
- Metagame
- Warden (software)
