= Tibia (video game) =

1997 video game

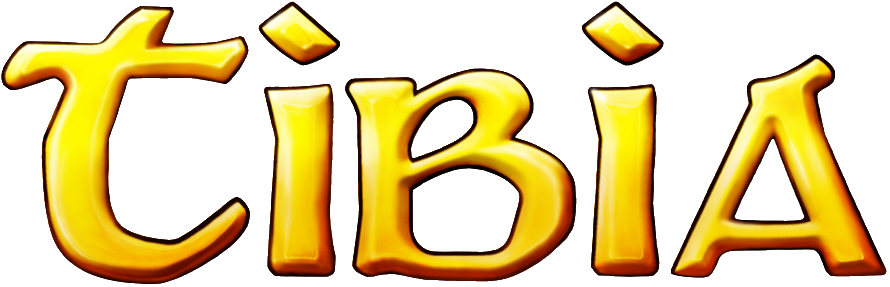
- Developer: CipSoft
- Publisher: CipSoft
- Platforms: Windows, macOS and Linux
- Release: January 7, 1997
- Genre: MMORPG
- Mode: Multiplayer

Tibia is a multiplayer online role-playing game (MMORPG) released in January, 1997. It was developed and published by CipSoft. It is one of the earliest and longest-running MMORPGs, having reached its peak of popularity in 2007. The Tibia MMORPG is free to play but players are able to pay to upgrade to a premium account. Tibia is a two-dimensional tile-based game set in a fantasy world with pixel art graphics and a top-down perspective.

== Gameplay ==
A team hunting Hellspawns

Tibia is a two-dimensional tile-based MMORPG with text-based elements. It is set in an open fantasy world that uses pixel art graphics, an oblique projection, and a top-down perspective. The core gameplay involves killing monsters to receive loot and gain experience, which causes the player to advance in level. Early in the game, players choose between one of five unique vocations, each of which uses different spells and abilities. Players may complete quests to receive rewards, kill bosses to obtain rare items, fight other players, form guilds, buy and decorate houses or guildhalls, or spend time on idle activities like fishing, training skills, or role-playing with other players. Interaction with Tibia's NPCs is text-based, requiring the player to type keywords like "Hi" and "Trade" to interact with them, similar to many earlier text-based adventure games. Many of Tibia's quests and activities require a team of players, and players can speak to each other using the client's chat interface. Tibia has five 'vocations' - knight, paladin, druid, sorcerer, and monk. Knights specialize in melee, paladins in distance fighting, sorcerers in offensive magic, druids in healing magic and monks in staff fighting. Once players choose their vocation, they will be permitted to take a ship to the mainland, where the rest of the game takes place. Once on the mainland, depending on the server's PvP type, players may be permitted to attack each other.

Tibia is an open world game that encourages exploration and discovery. Very little instruction is given once the player has reached the mainland, and the game is distinguished by its harsh penalty upon dying. Players progress in the game by upgrading their equipment, increasing their level, and completing quests to access restricted locations. Each level requires the player to accumulate more experience than the previous level, but unlike many other MMORPGs, Tibia does not have a level cap, so players are permitted to gain levels without limits.

=== Setting ===
In its early years, Tibia took place in a medieval Tolkien-esque setting, but as years passed and new areas and content were added, inspiration was drawn from a wide range of fantasy, mythological, and historical influences, resulting in a diverse world of many continents, with seventeen major cities. NPCs have unique dialogue and responses to keywords provided by the player. NPCs can buy and sell items, give quests, provide information and hints, and tell stories. The world also contains many books and libraries that contain information, quest hints, tales, and history about the world of Tibia. Tibia contains many allusions to the outside world, including pop culture references, allusions to video games and books, mythological references, and more. The demonym of a Tibia player is Tibian.

=== Combat ===
Tibia has hundreds of weapons and armors used for fighting and protection from attacks. Melee fighting is the specialty of knights, who may choose to advance their sword, axe, or club skills, and who may also wear a large variety of armors and shields. Melee attacks only hit monsters on squares adjacent to the attacker. Ranged fighting is the specialty of paladins, who attack using an assortment of bows, crossbows, and throwing stars. Ranged attacks can hit monsters from many squares away, and different weapons have different attack ranges.

All five vocations can use magic to some degree. Sorcerers and druids have a wide variety of magic spells available to them, while paladins, monks and knights have a limited variety. Tibia's magic system is text-based. There are two types of magic: instant magic and rune magic. Instant magic uses spells that, once cast, will consume mana in order to produce the desired effect. Each spell uses spell words and consumes some of the character's mana points to use. Some spells are offensive and deal damage to creatures, some heal the player, and others serve other purposes. To cast a spell, a player can type the words of the spell into the text channel. Typing "exura gran" casts the Greater Healing spell. Tibia's client developed over the years to make spells easier and quicker to cast using hotkeys. Players may assign each spell to a hotkey, and press the hotkey when they wish to cast it.

Rune magic is magic cast by using an item called a rune. Runes are magic spells stored in small stones. To create runes, a player casts a spell while holding a blank rune in their inventory. Casting the spell "adori mas flam" consumes 530 mana and turns one blank rune into four "Great Fireball" runes, which may be stored in the player's inventory and then used later. Players may buy both blank runes and spell runes from vendor NPCs, along with mana and health potions to restore hit points and mana.

=== PvP ===
Players in Tibia are allowed to attack and kill other players. The rules governing PvP vary depending on the player's server type. Some servers, called Optional-PvP, don't allow player killing except under certain circumstances, while other server types, such as Hardcore PvP, encourage such fighting where the player gains experience points for killing other players. In Tibia's early years, players could kill any number of players without limits, and players who died lost a portion of their experience and dropped their backpacks and equipment. For this reason, Tibia earned a reputation for being a punishing, unforgiving game. Over the years, PvP rules were adjusted and modified, and a complex system is known as the "skull system" was implemented on Open-PvP servers to limit player killing. Many items and resources in Tibia are limited, and many intense large-scale wars have been fought in Tibia to decide who gets them.

=== Houses and guildhalls ===
Players are allowed to purchase houses and guildhalls in Tibia's major cities. The houses sit in the view of those walking by, and players often decorate their houses in various ways. Some players display their rarest items, and others decorate their houses with roleplaying items such as tables and chairs.

== History and development ==
Tibia's development began in 1995 as a hobby project of German students Guido Lübke, Stephan Payer, Ulrich Schlott and Stephan Vogler under the name CIP Productions. The first server went online in January 1997 and its growing popularity led to the creation of CipSoft GmbH in June 2001. Premium accounts were introduced the same year, which allowed players to pay a monthly fee to gain additional in-game benefits. In the years that followed, more features were introduced, including map expansions, new outfits, new game mechanics including a "skull system" for PvP, and additional game worlds. The number of players online reached its peak at 64,028 players on November 28, 2007, with CipSoft reporting over 250,000 active players. According to a 2009 poll conducted by CipSoft, players came from a very wide range of countries, the largest numbers living in Brazil (26.56%) and Poland (24.38%). Other countries included Mexico, Sweden, the United States, the Netherlands, Spain, Chile, Canada, Venezuela, United Kingdom, and Germany.

Tibia has remained online up to the present, with developers releasing major content updates every six months. There are currently 68 game servers online, of which 24 in Europe, 25 in North America, and 19 in South America.

Before game updates test servers are run to find and repair bugs and glitches within the update. These servers are first available for testing to players that hold official positions such as Tutors, Fansite representatives and Senators. Test servers are sometimes opened to the general Tibian public. The major updates usually involve the creation of new cities, hunting areas, spells, weapons, etc. Updates may also include graphic redesign, gameplay changes, and anti-cheating measures. In addition to the major updates, as needed, minor updates are done throughout the year to fix bugs and other minor problems.

=== Phasing out of Game Masters (GMs) ===
In late 2010, CipSoft decided to phase-out the "Game Master" system which had been used since launch. The Game Masters, commonly known as "GMs" to the community were compensated for their time with a rare item of their choice. CipSoft implemented a new report statement function to the game client that players could use themselves, and the official course of action is for customer support to deal with all game queries. These representatives can be noted on the game's forum boards as Community Managers, or "CM" for short.

=== Level 999 ===
In 2005, a Tibia update added a door that requires a player to reach level 999 before it opens. The level 999 door remained a mystery until August 2016 when a player named Kharsek, the first player to reach level 999, entered the room. Kharsek, however, chose to keep their discoveries behind the door a secret, and the general public had to wait another ten months to learn the answer to the mystery of what lay behind the door. In June 2017, a player named Dev onica broadcast a live stream via their Twitch account, where they entered the level 999 door at level 1,001; they were transported to a tropical island with a variety of NPCs and no additional content of note.

== Support and rules ==
The Tibian support system is made up of volunteer Tutors and paid Customer Support. Tutors are regular players who have no special or legal standing but can report in-game bugs as well as have access to a private chat channel and forums. Customer Support members are employees of CipSoft who handle cheating and bug reports. Retired gamemasters and long-term tutors may also, with prior invitation by CipSoft, choose to adopt the honorary title of Senator.

The role of tutor encompasses a number of duties including answering questions from the in-game Help Channel and on the Help board on the forum, checking the private tutor board and in-game channels regularly, and reporting bugs. All players are now able to report inappropriate statements, names, and posts in-game or on the forums which were previously a power held by tutors and higher positions.

Eligibility for the tutor position is determined if the player's account is registered, has been played for at least three months with one character having at least level 20, their criminal record contains no banishment entries, and has received 40 "Thank you!'s" in the last 90 days. "Thank you!'s" are garnered when players submit them via the in-game Help channel or on the forums Help board indicating a player's appreciation of someone's assistance. Players previously had to take an online multiple-choice test on the official website to become a tutor and after 3 months of active tutorship without a bad/false report would be automatically promoted to the position of senior tutor.

=== Rule violations ===
Conduct from players and premium accounts are expected to abide by rules rather similar to most such games, including prohibitions against sharing or selling account information, exploiting "obvious" errors or flaws which give unreasonable advantages to a player, posing as CipSoft employees, using any and all non-official programs such as "bots", and offensive behaviors. In such events, CipSoft uses a system of a violation record and conduct levels that grade both the severity and frequency of violations, with the "conduct level" slowly relenting over time with no new violations. Once a violation is entered in the record it can be protested until 60 days have lapsed, allowing players to protest inappropriate charges or complain if the charges are not understood; the entry cannot be expunged from the record later than that time. If the conduct level reaches its highest state, whether through continued minor violations or few very severe ones, the account is threatened with banishment (from the game and forum) or deletion. If an account has been banished or scheduled for deletion, CipSoft promulgates that the only recourse is to either create a new character or appeal to Customer Support directly.

By January 2009, CipSoft banned 4,959 characters for using illegal software while playing. A quote from CipSoft at the Tibia website states:

These accounts have been identified by an automatic tool with complete accuracy, therefore any complaints about these punishments are in vain. They are final and complaints will be ignored. We will neither reveal our criteria for these punishments, nor will we hand out any proofs.

The article goes on to say that CipSoft is not finished and will continue to work hard to eliminate cheating from the game. Since then, CipSoft has used this automatic tool about once a month to delete tens of thousands of accounts.

In September 2010, CipSoft made fundamental changes to the player versus player fighting mechanism, in an effort to mitigate abuse.

CipSoft implemented the kernel-level anti-cheat software BattlEye, launched on 18 April 2017, with retroactive protection to other game-worlds over the course of a year.
