= Red Orchestra 2: Heroes of Stalingrad =

2011 video game

- Developer: Tripwire Interactive
- Publisher: 1C Company
- Composer: Sam Hulick
- Engine: Unreal Engine 3
- Platform: Microsoft Windows
- Release: NA: September 13, 2011; AU: September 15, 2011; EU: September 16, 2011
- Genres: Tactical shooter, first-person shooter
- Mode: Multiplayer

Red Orchestra 2: Heroes of Stalingrad and Rising Storm GOTY, now known as Rising Storm/Red Orchestra 2 GOTY on Steam, is a multiplayer tactical first-person shooter video game set during World War II, developed and published by Tripwire Interactive. Released in September 2011, it is a sequel to Red Orchestra: Ostfront 41–45. The title focuses heavily on the Battle of Stalingrad and the Pacific Theater.

The game is a Windows exclusive and contains many new features compared to the original, including a new first-person cover system, which can also be combined with blind firing, first-person collision detection, Commander role and abilities as well as an entirely new system of statistics tracking and player levelling. Maps are much bigger and had immediate 64-player support.

An expansion pack, Rising Storm, was released in May 2013, featuring the addition of the Pacific Theater, adding the United States and the Empire of Japan as playable factions. This spawned a sequel, Rising Storm 2: Vietnam, set in the Vietnam War.

== Game modes ==
The game features four server settings called Play Styles: Custom, Action, Realistic and Classic. Classic is based on the original Red Orchestra, Realism is the standard mode and Action is more forgiving than Realism or Classic. All maps and theaters of Rising Storm/Red Orchestra 2 GOTY support Multiplayer Campaign, Territory Control and Countdown. Some maps don't support Firefight. Singleplayer is unable to be played directly from or within the Multiplayer installation of the game.

=== Single-player campaign (removed from newer updates) ===
Owners of Red Orchestra 2: Heroes of Stalingrad and Rising Storm GOTY used to have access to a separate singleplayer campaign installation of both games, which was removed in a later update to the game, meaning only those who owned it at the time could still access or install the singleplayer campaign.

==== Reception ====
The singleplayer campaign received a fairly negative reception due to the uninteresting gameplay, which was mostly caused by very poorly programmed AI opponents and teammates. A singleplayer game plays much like a multiplayer campaign except each team only has less than 12 players and the player assumes control of a bot when he dies, with no reinforcements to the teams.

=== Multiplayer campaign (TE) ===
The multiplayer campaign is a multiple-map based game of Territory Control, with each side having a certain Combat Power that they replenish or lose by winning and losing a match against the enemy and the number of reinforcements each side loses. The side with the most combat power at the end of a match will decide whether to Attack or Defend: if they attack, they have to choose an enemy held sector and map to attack. If they defend, the enemy can choose a sector and map to attack.

Combat power also affects the number of bonus reinforcements and which team has the reinforcement advantage in the next match.

Once the enemy team holds all enemy sectors or drains the combat power of the enemy team, they win.

=== Territory Control (TE) ===
A 40 minute to 2 hour long timed match between two teams to complete the map objectives. A team has to complete all possible objectives on the map or wipe out the enemy team to win before the time runs out, primarily capturing control points by having more teammates in it than the enemy.

=== Countdown (CD) ===
One team attacks while the other defends, but the attacking team does not respawn until they capture a control point from the enemy, which they must do in less than 3 minutes. Once they do, their dead teammates respawn and they swap places—now attackers must defend the objective, while defenders must attack it.

Attackers have a Commander which has 2 Force Respawns to use to give them a fair shot, letting him respawn all the previously dead teammates immediately.

=== Firefight (FF) ===
This game mode is a simple Team Deathmatch: the team to first kill a certain number of the opposing team, or just have killed more of them than they did, wins. The players spawn near where their teammates are on the map, instead of from a fixed spawn, similar to other team deathmatch games.

=== Search and Destroy (SD) ===
Similar to Counter-Strike defuse maps, the attacking team has a bomb and has to plant it at a specific location, while the defending team must kill the bomb carrier before they are able to do that and wipe out the enemy team. The attacking team can also wipe out the defenders to win. Both teams have only one life and no reinforcements.

== Gameplay ==
A Soviet soldier training his rifle at a doorway

Rising Storm/Red Orchestra 2 is a realistic first-person shooter. Guns behave realistically, with bullet drop and spin taken into account. The game also takes away many of the elements of a traditional HUD, like an ammo counter, forcing players to remember, or manually check, the approximate number of rounds that are left in the gun's magazine. Additionally, the game employs a realistic mode of reload management. When reloading a weapon, the character checks the weight of the new magazine and determines if it is heavy (full or close to full) or light (empty or close to empty). The game's first-person cover system allows players to hide behind objects to avoid enemy fire. While in cover, players can peek out to take more accurate shots or fire blindly. However, the shape, size, and composition of the object changes its effectiveness at protecting the player. Smaller objects may not cover the player's entire body, and some may not stop bullets. Health does not regenerate over time or by use of medical equipment, but non-fatal wounds must still be bandaged to prevent further blood loss.

The player gains "Kill Points" and "Honor Points" which level up their weapons and the Honor level of each class, which is akin to the class level. The higher the character's Honor, the more rugged their outfit will be, and the weapons receive new features upon levelling up, such as a bayonet for the bolt-action rifles, or a drum magazine for the soviet submachine guns. The game features a limited number of slots for each of its various classes for the Soviet army, Wehrmacht army, Imperial Japanese and the US Marine Corps. Each class is based on a historical role of the respective army in that time frame. Tanks do not appear in Rising Storm.

The classes available in Rising Storm/Red Orchestra 2 are:

- Commander, who can use radio emplacements to call in artillery or recon planes.
- Squad Leader, who can give artillery co-ordinates to the Commander, and teammates can spawn on the SL, allowing them to reach the frontline faster.
- Sniper, whose rifle is equipped with a scope, letting them engage at longer ranges.
- Rifleman, who can only use a bolt-action rifle, with the exception of the American forces, who can have a semi-automatic M1 Garand.
- Elite Rifleman, Red Orchestra 2 only, elite riflemen can use a semi-automatic rifle.
- Automatic Rifleman, exclusive to the American forces, who uses an M1918 BAR.
- Assault, who can use a submachine gun, not available to American forces.
- Elite Assault, Red Orchestra 2 only, elite assault, can use a automatic rifle, like StG 44 or AVT-40.
- Engineer, who is equipped with satchel charges which can destroy enemy barricades, bunkers or tanks.
- Machine gunner, whose machine gun must be deployed in order to be effective.
- Anti-tank, who uses an anti-tank rifle, which can destroy enemy tanks, but must be deployed in order to fire.
- Tank Commander, who can give orders to his other crewmen.
- Tank crewman: As the loader will always be a bot, the rest of the tank crew will consist of the driver, main gunner, and hull gunner, who will operate the tank's main gun, and machine gun.
- Flamethrower, US only, equipped with a Flamethrower, which can burn through enemy defenses with ease.
- Light Mortar, Japanese only, equipped with a Type 89 grenade discharger (aka the 'knee mortar'), which can be fired either like a traditional mortar, or used in direct fire.

Players who level up their classes enough will change in appearance to very closely resemble the level 1 look of the enemy team in color and uniform. Leveling up weapons means the player will gain up to two additional upgrades to their weapon, which vary between weapons, and some changes are purely cosmetic, such as the removal of the rear sights on the Karabiner 98k. Leveling up weapons also causes the player to get steadier aim, less recoil, and faster reloads. Class and weapon level also reduces the level at which the player loses stamina, and becomes suppressed. Every team has a number of squads making up a 64 player team.

Every team starts out with around 400-600 tickets (to simulate reinforcing a battalion) called reinforcements, with each game lasting around 30 minutes to 2 hours. In Territory Control (TE) maps, players have to attack the control points of a defending team which are usually large landmarks and other large zones of capture players must enter. The team with the most people in a capture point will start capturing the point for their team, unless they are killed while trying to attack or defend it. Players may choose to respawn on a number of spawn points or at a particular role in the squad (machine gunner or squad leader) as the role they select, and respawn in waves that spend the team's reinforcement tickets. The team to wipe out the opposing side with no reinforcements left or by completing all of the objectives indicated on the Map screen wins (capturing and destroying objectives).

There are tanks, APCs, artillery and recon planes in Red Orchestra 2. The interiors of each tank are fully recreated with either a human or AI manning each station. The level of detail was described by Tripwire's president John Gibson as "rivaling or exceeding tank simulation games." Because of the extensive work required to recreate each vehicle, which Tripwire estimates took three months each, the game launched with two tanks: the German Panzer IV Ausf. G and Soviet T-34/76. In April 2014, the Game of the Year addition was released with the Search and Destroy game mode, new maps and two armoured personnel carriers were added into the game: a Sd.Kfz. 251, used by the Germans, and a British Universal Carrier with a mounted DP-27 machine gun used by the Soviets. These additions gave infantry more protection and a quick alternative for moving around the battlefield. Two more tanks, the German Panzer III Ausf. M and the Soviet T-70 along with the MG42 German machine gun were added in the free Armored Assault DLC.

== Development ==
In June 2011, Red Orchestra 2's developer Tripwire announced they would be taking an aggressive, three-pronged approach to proactively deal with cheating. Red Orchestra 2 would be using a combination of three anti-cheat services; VAC along with Punkbuster and a related service called PBBans. Server operators can choose to use any or none of these services. Tripwire later clarified that Punkbuster for Red Orchestra 2 will have three levels of protection so server operators can optionally make it more or less aggressive in kicking players. A Beta was initiated early on the development process with several phases. First, the Family and Friends Beta for family members and friends of the Tripwire Interactive staff. Then the Beta moved on to include long time clans from Red Orchestra: Ostfront 41–45 and clans new to the game. After this stage, the Beta was opened for anyone that had pre-ordered the Digital Deluxe Edition of the game, which gave the added bonus of participating in the final stage of the Beta.

Rising Storm was released on May 30, 2013 as a standalone expansion to Red Orchestra 2. An optional Digital Deluxe edition is available, and a Red Orchestra 2: Heroes of Stalingrad ownership bonus discount of 25% on the Steam store. A 15% preorder discount was also available. Owners of the original Red Orchestra 2: Heroes of Stalingrad received free access to the rifleman class, whilst buyers of Rising Storm were given the original game as well. As of 2018, both games' content is merged and cannot be bought separately as "Rising Storm/Red Orchestra 2 GOTY" on Steam. The game has had many gameplay and feature updates from 2011 to 2015. The last update released for both games was on October 20, 2015.

Rising Storm features content based on the Pacific war between the US and Japan. Both sides have distinct weaponry and abilities so as to create an asymmetric gameplay. The Americans have access to high firepower weapons such as semi-automatic rifles, machineguns and flamethrowers. The Japanese are instead equipped with bolt-action rifles, hand-held mortars, mines, katanas and the ability to banzai charge: causing the enemy to be suppressed and have it difficult to fire back to simulate fear, for the duration of the charge.

A sequel, Rising Storm 2: Vietnam, was released on May 30, 2017.

== Mods ==
Some mod teams were given early access to the Steam Development Kit (SDK) and have been developing mods. These mods include In Country Vietnam and Rising Storm, which later went commercial as an agreement between Tripwire Interactive and Rising Storm Team to push the product commercially in case of successful mod development. Another mod called Vehicle Expansion was supposed to be released as an official update for Red Orchestra 2: Heroes of Stalingrad with Tripwire Interactive Vice President John Gibson offering to help with programming, however due to modding team owning student licences of 3D Software, it was never released and all work scrapped. Modifications to come out after Rising Storm release are Heroes of the West, set in Western Europe during the campaigns of 1944 and 1945, which also could have been sold as a DLC, however at a time due to it being released in 2016, was only released as a free mod on Steam, and Aufmarsch: The Great War 1914–1918, which includes maps set on both the Eastern and Western Fronts of World War I. There is also the CGT mod that adds classic gametypes such as Capture the Flag and Search & Destroy to the game. The full SDK was made available in January 2012. The SDK has allowed modders to create many custom maps for the base game, Rising Storm, and for the game's mods. These maps expand the variety of locations represented in game, adding battles in places like Ukraine, the Caucasus, and various Pacific islands.

== Music ==
Sam Hulick's Main Theme
30-second sample from the theme of Red Orchestra 2: Heroes of Stalingrad.

Composer Sam Hulick, one of the principal composers for the Mass Effect series, was chosen to score the game. The game features a dynamic music system, which will cue different music depending on the state of the battle. The Russian and German sides have their own separate soundtrack.

== Themes ==
The game has been described as a work of Social Realism because of game mechanics which stress human hardship and the social and psychological consequences of war.

== Rising Storm ==
A standalone expansion pack, titled Rising Storm, was announced in 2010 and released May 30, 2013. It features the addition of the Pacific Theater and the United States Marine Corps, United States Army, Imperial Japanese Army, and Special Naval Landing Forces as playable factions, as well as new weapons, maps, and gameplay mechanics.

It received mostly positive reception. A sequel, Rising Storm 2: Vietnam, was announced June 2015 and released May 2017.

== Reception ==
Reception

Aggregate score
Aggregator	Score
Metacritic	76/100

Review scores
Publication	Score
Destructoid	8/10
Edge	7/10
GamePro	4/5
GameSpot	7.5/10
GameSpy	4.5/5
GameTrailers	7.6/10
IGN	8/10
PC Gamer (UK)	78%
PC PowerPlay	8/10

Red Orchestra 2: Heroes of Stalingrad received "generally favorable reviews" according to the review aggregation website Metacritic.

GameSpot gave it a 7.5/10, with a generally positive review, only critiquing the game's singleplayer component, stability (citing frequent crashes) and inconsistent, unrefined game mechanics.

Gamespy gave the game a 9/10, praising the game's immersion and depth, but critiqued the numerous bugs: "Red Orchestra 2: Heroes of Stalingrad is the kind of shooter that can live only on the PC. This is as hardcore as first person shooters get, and if you're prepared to put the time in to learn how to play it well, you'll be rewarded with a level of satisfaction that team deathmatch will never deliver. Tripwire should be applauded for not being afraid to innovate, but at the same time I wonder if they've bitten off a little more than they could chew. Despite the bugs, this is the perfect shooter for those who like to exercise their intellect as much as their trigger fingers."

Reviewers had generally positive, to mixed feelings about the title. Most spoke positively of the game's realism and attention to detail, but it was held back by excessive bugs.
