= RSS (disambiguation) =

RSS is a family of web feed formats.

RSS may also refer to:

== Organizations ==
=== Education ===
- Red Swastika School, Singapore
- Riverside Secondary School (Windsor, Ontario), Canada
- Rowan-Salisbury Schools, in Salisbury, North Carolina, US

=== Other organizations ===
- Radio Security Service, a British signals intelligence group during World War II
- Raqqa Is Being Slaughtered Silently, a citizen journalism effort in Syria
- Rashtriya Swayamsevak Sangh, an Indian Hindutva paramilitary organisation
- Red Swastika Society, a Taoist association founded in China in 1922
- Regional Security System, an agreement between several countries in the Caribbean region
- Remote Sensing Systems, in Santa Rosa, California, US
- IBM Retail Store Solutions, a division of IBM
- Royal Society of Sculptors, a British organisation
- Royal Stuart Society, a monarchist organisation in the United Kingdom

== Mathematics ==
- Residual sum of squares in statistics
- Royal Statistical Society, a scientific and professional body for statisticians in the UK

== Science and technology ==
=== Biology and medicine ===
- Russell-Silver syndrome, a form of dwarfism
- Recombination signal sequences, genes used to generate antibodies and T-cell receptors in immunology
- Reactive sulfur species, chemically reactive molecules containing sulfur

=== Computing and telecommunications ===
- Radio Service Software, a suite of programs sold by Motorola
- IBM Retail Store Solutions, a division of IBM
- Received signal strength indication, referring to the strength of the signal that a receiver gets in a wireless communication
- Receive-side scaling, a scaling technique for network traffic processing
- Resident set size, the portion of memory occupied by a process that is held in RAM

=== Other uses ===
- Radio science subsystem, on a scientific spacecraft, the use of radio signals to probe a medium such as a planetary atmosphere
- Reduced Space Symbology, a family of barcodes now called GS1 DataBar
- Rotary steerable system, a tool used in the drilling industry
- Rotating Service Structure, part of the Space Shuttle launch tower

== Other uses ==
- Red Sea (state) in Sudan
- Regional spatial strategy, a planning document for a region of England
- Republic of Singapore Ship, commissioned Navy ships belonging to the Republic of Singapore Navy
- Reusable spaceship
- Rockdale, Sandow and Southern Railroad, in Texas

== See also ==
- RS (disambiguation)
- RS2 (disambiguation)
