= Super People =

Battle royale video game

SUPER PEOPLE
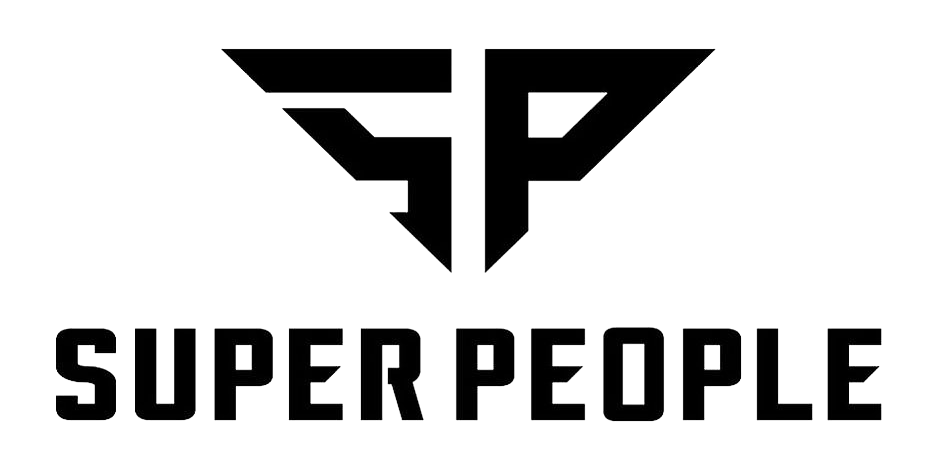
- Developer: Wonder People
- Publisher: Wonder Games
- Director: Seong Gon Park
- Platform: Microsoft Windows
- Release: October 10th, 2022 (US) October 11th, 2022 (KR)
- Genre: Battle royale
- Mode: Multiplayer

Super People (stylized as "SUPER PEOPLE") was a battle royale game developed by South Korean studio Wonder People, and published by Wonder Games. Directed by Seong Gon Park, the debut title gained popularity on Steam, with 4.3 million players participating in its closed beta test in February 2022.

A final closed beta test for the game concluded on August 30, 2022, before the game finally launched in Early Access on October 8, 2022.

The game was rebranded as Super People 2 on December 12, 2022, a change the developer said reflected “huge and sweeping changes” to core systems. However, on May 23, 2023, the developer announced plans to terminate the live service in August due to declining user numbers, despite ongoing balance patches and updates. The live service was terminated on August 21, 2023. It was briefly revived but shut down again on February 23rd, 2026.

== Revival and Closure ==
In June 2025, Wonder People launched a new closed beta featuring updated gameplay systems, including anti-cheat measures, balanced progression without pay-to-win mechanics, resurrection options, and PvPvE elements such as boss monsters and the Altar of Buffs.

The beta received criticism from sections of the player base. Some players argued that the inclusion of PvE boss monsters disrupted pacing and clashed with the game’s core competitive focus, while others described the temporary in-game shop as intrusive, reducing tactical looting depth and cluttering the interface. Following community feedback, Wonder People announced that several of these new features, including boss monsters and the in-game shop, would be removed or reworked before the Early Access relaunch.

Wonder People confirmed that the title would revert from Super People 2 back to Super People, and that it is scheduled to re-enter Early Access on Steam on September 18, 2025.

Despite initial success dwindling player count resulted in the service being terminated once again in February of 2026.

== Gameplay ==
Super People was a player versus player, class-based shooter, set on the fictional island of Orb Island. Similar in gameplay to battle royale titles PUBG: Battlegrounds or Fortnite, players parachute into the map with limited supplies to engage in a large-scale, elimination-style deathmatch, until one player or one team remains. Once on the ground, players can craft or scavenge for weapons and gear, which can differ in type and quality. Players are given the option to freely toggle between first-person and third-person viewpoints.

=== Classes ===
Unique to Super People, players are randomly assigned to one of thirteen character classes, with an option to reroll in exchange for in-game gold.

== Story ==
Players assumed the role of super soldiers, who are the product of a genetic enhancement program initially devised to aid humans on Mars. Granting superhuman abilities, the enhancement technology quickly attracts the attention of rogue agents and criminals, who infiltrate the elite group of soldiers and sow discord. With declining morale and a looming terrorist threat, the super soldiers fracture and turn on one another, resulting in the ongoing conflict on the proxy settlement of Orb Island.

== Development ==
Super People was first announced in a game reveal trailer on July 16, 2021. It is expected to launch as a free-to-play early access game. In response to player feedback a final closed beta test was available in late August 2022, featuring daily tournaments and a $75,000 (USD) cash prize pool for top players.
