= Standoff 2 =

2017 video game

- Current game logo
- Developer: Axlebolt
- Publisher: Axlebolt
- Composers: Ivan Sysoev; Sava Tsurkanu
- Series: Standoff
- Engine: Unity
- Platforms: Android, iOS, HarmonyOS
- Release: Android: April 17, 2017; iOS: March 28, 2018; HarmonyOS: July 23, 2020
- Genre: First-person shooter
- Mode: Multiplayer

Standoff 2 is a free-to-play online mobile multiplayer first-person shooter game developed and published by Cypriot company Axlebolt in 2017 for Android, in 2018 for iOS and in 2020 for HarmonyOS smartphones.

== Gameplay ==
Screenshot of gameplay in the "Allies" mode

Standoff 2 is a classical first-person shooter (FPS) game with multiple different gamemodes and modern Russian and non-Russian weapons. Each weapon has different characteristics, divided into the following categories: damage, fire rate, recoil control, range accuracy, movement rate, armor penetration and penetration power.

Multiple gamemodes are available, such as Defuse, Team Deathmatch and Arms Race. Reaching level 10 unlocks duel mode Reaching level 15 unlocks the "Allies" mode and reaching level 20 unlocks the "Competitive" mode.

Unlike most mobile shooters, in Standoff 2 there is no auto-shooting and aiming assistance, but at the same time there is also a flexible control setting: the ability to move, change the visibility and size of most of the interface elements. Only decorative items that do not affect the gameplay are sold for real money in the game.

== Gamemodes ==
=== Defuse ===
In this mode, 10 players are divided into two teams of five: Defense (CT) and Attack (T). They compete on one of the seven available maps. The Terrorists aim to either plant the bomb at one of the two designated bomb sites and defend it until it explodes, or eliminate all of the counter terrorists. The Counter-Terrorists must eliminate the Terrorists or defuse the bomb before it detonates.

Players spawn at team-specific locations on opposite sides of the map. Based on their performance in a round—primarily the number of kills—they earn money, which can be used to purchase weapons unique to their team. Weapons have limited ammunition and can run out. Once a player is killed, they cannot respawn until the next round begins.

Matches can last up to 11 rounds, with no possibility of a draw. The first team to win 6 rounds wins the match.

=== Team Deathmatch ===
In this mode, up to 10 players are split into two teams and play on one of eight available maps. Players instantly respawn after being killed. The objective is to score more total kills than the opposing team within a 5-minute time limit. Players have unlimited ammunition and can choose from any weapons available to their team. Each team spawns at its designated area on opposite sides of the map.

=== Arms Race ===
Two teams face off, but only one player can win. Instead of choosing weapons, players progress through a level system where each level corresponds to a different weapon. To advance a level, a player must get two kills with their current weapon without dying. Alternatively, using a knife—available at all times—grants an immediate level up. The first player to reach level 20 wins the match. Maps used in this mode are the same as in Team Deathmatch.

==== MMR System ====
In Competitive, Allies, and Duel modes, players are unranked for their first 10 matches. After completing these placement matches, players receive an initial rank. In each subsequent game in these ranked modes, players gain or lose MMR points based on predefined performance factors.

== Reception ==
Critics often compare Standoff 2 to Counter-Strike: Global Offensive and call it a mobile clone. Sushant Rohan from PCQuest called the game the best mobile adaptation of CS:GO and an ideal FPS game and praised good frame rate, enjoyable gameplay, good weapon skins and strong protection against cheaters and hackers. Sushant noted that the game may not be optimized enough, as some players experience slow performance in the game, but in his opinion that is typical for any multiplayer mobile game, or the freeze is due to the fact that Standoff 2 is not designed to work on MediaTek devices. In the third quarter of 2021, Standoff 2 entered the top three most profitable games on the Russian mobile game market.
