= XiaoWeiXiao =

Chinese professional League of Legends player

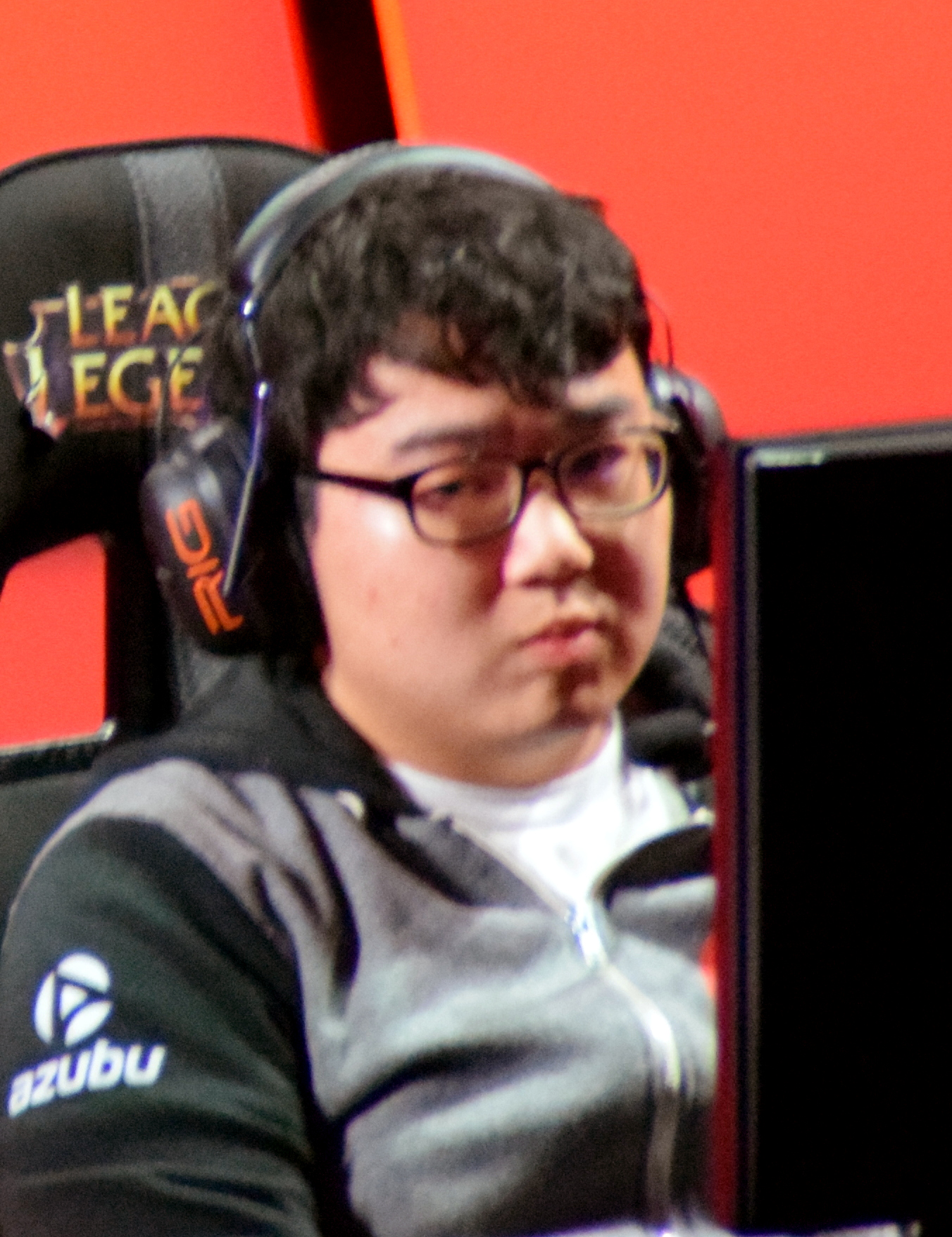
- Yu in 2015

Personal information
- Name: 余显 (Yu Xian)
- Nationality: Chinese

Career information
- Games: League of Legends
- Playing career: 2012–2018
- Role: Mid Laner

Team history
- 2012–2013: Royal Club
- 2013: Royal Club Tian Ci
- 2013–2014: LMQ
- 2015: Team Impulse
- 2016: Oh My Dream
- 2017: Now or Never
- 2017: DS Gaming
- 2018: TS Gaming
- 2018: VS Gaming

Career highlights and awards
- 2014 NA LCS Summer MVP

Chinese name
- Chinese: 余显
Transcriptions
Standard Mandarin
- Hanyu Pinyin: Yú Xiǎn

Chinese alias
- Chinese: 小微笑
- Literal meaning: small smile
Transcriptions
Standard Mandarin
- Hanyu Pinyin: xiăo wēixiào

Yu Xian (Chinese: 余显), better known by his in-game name XiaoWeiXiao (小微笑), is a Chinese professional League of Legends player. He was most recently the mid laner for Victory Song Gaming of the League of Legends Developmental League, China's secondary league for professional League of Legends. His name is derived from that of another Chinese player, Gao "WeiXiao" Xuecheng, who has since retired from professional competition. He received the 2014 NA LCS Summer MVP award in August 2014.

== Career ==
=== Season 2 ===
XiaoWeiXiao made his entrance into the competitive scene at the end of the season, joining Royal Club. His time with the team saw him compete in a number of notable tournaments, including the Gunnar Invitational, which XiaoWeiXiao and the team won, beating OMG in the final. During his time on the starting roster, the team also managed 3rd-place finishes in both and HAN Pro League, along with a tournament win at the 2012 GALAXY eSports Carnival.

=== Season 3 ===
XiaoWeiXiao also contributed to the team's 3rd-place finish in the G-League 2012 Season 2, but was moved to the second squad, Royal Club Tian Ci after the tournament. The new team competed in few tournaments, with their main success coming in the Go4LoL Pro Asia 2013 Season 1, which saw the team come 2nd behind OMG.

A few months later, the team disbanded, with XiaoWeiXiao and the majority of the roster going on to join LMQ. The team started off by competing in the Summer Split of the LPL, though their results were disappointing, and the team finished in 6th place. However, LMQ followed this up with a 3rd-place finish at National Electronic Sports Tournament.

=== Season 4 ===
It was at this point that XiaoWeiXiao and the team decided to venture to North America in search of success. After convincing wins in minor tournaments, LMQ made their way into the Challenger Series, dominating the scene. Wins in Challenger Spring #1 and Challenger Spring #2 made the team's intentions clear. With the LCS in their sights, XiaoWeiXiao and the team went on to win the Challenger Spring Playoffs, beating Cloud 9 Tempest in the final.

A convincing 1st-place finish at the National ESL Pro Series - Season IX set XiaoWeiXiao and the team up for their participation in the upcoming LCS Summer Promotion. LMQ went on to beat XDG in their promotion match-up, meaning that the Chinese outfit had made it into the North American LCS.

The Summer Split was a complete success for XiaoWeiXiao and LMQ, with the midlaner impressing on a range of champions including Yasuo and Twisted Fate. He also managed to pick up 3 Weekly MVP awards, more than anyone else has done in one split. LMQ finished 2nd overall, despite having the same number of wins as the 1st-place Cloud9. This meant that they had qualified for the Summer Playoffs, a chance to make it to the World Championship. LMQ and XiaoWeiXiao went on to finish 3rd in the playoffs, losing to eventual champions Team SoloMid in the semifinals, but then securing their place in the 2014 Season World Championship by beating Team Curse in the 3rd place match.

The World Championship saw LMQ placed in Group C with Samsung Blue, OMG, and Fnatic. The team was only able to win 2 matches out of 6 in their group, meaning that they would go no further in the tournament.

=== 2015 Preseason ===
Despite the departure of the rest of the Chinese roster and the LMQ's rebranding to Team Impulse, XiaoWeiXiao stayed with the team, the only member of LMQ to do so. During the off season, XiaoWeiXiao competed in the Best Zed NA Tournament, only losing to Huhi in the semifinals.

=== 2015 season ===
Team Impulse finished the NA LCS spring split round robin with an 11–7 record, in fourth place. In the playoffs, they defeated Gravity before losing to Team SoloMid and then Team Liquid, placing fourth overall. On July 22, XiaoWeiXiao was temporarily suspended pending investigation into elo-boosting allegations. In the meantime, Team Impulse started Gate in the mid lane. A few weeks after his suspension, he was banned from competitive play until February 1, 2016. After his ban he returned to China.

When his ban was lifted he joined OMG's sister team Oh My Dream.
