= CipSoft =

German video game developer

CipSoft GmbH
- Company type: Private
- Industry: Video games
- Founded: 8 June 2001; 24 years ago
- Founders: Guido Lübke; Stephan Payer; Ulrich Schlott; Stephan Vogler
- Headquarters: Regensburg, Germany
- Products: Tibia
- Number of employees: 100 (2024)
- Website: https://cipsoft.com

CipSoft GmbH is a German video game developer based in Regensburg. Founded in 2001, it is the developer of Tibia. As of August 2024, the company employs 100 people.

== History ==
CipSoft was founded on 8 June 2001 by Guido Lübke, Stephan Payer, Ulrich Schlott, and Stephan Vogler. The four had developed the game Tibia during their time at university and released it in 1997. After completing their studies, they founded CipSoft to continue the development of the game.

== Games ==
=== Tibia ===
Tibia is one of the first online role-playing games (MMORPG) ever created. It is the main product of CipSoft GmbH. On the islands of Tibia players discover a fantastic 2D world where they can go on virtual adventures. The main intention of the game is for the player to develop the character and to prove oneself as a knight, paladin, sorcerer or druid. The fact that Tibia is still based on 2D has never influenced the growth of the number of players. In 2008, Tibia was seen as one of the "8 best MMORPGs for Linux".

=== TibiaME ===
TibiaME is the first online role playing game for mobile phones. The story of TibiaME is inspired by the PC game Tibia. As a knight or a sorcerer, the players develop the skills of their selected characters. By exploring large varieties of areas, they will come upon exciting quests and dangerous dungeons where hundreds of players can set their forces together. Communicating and interacting with other players in a diplomacy is only one attractive aspect of TibiaME. The player can log out at any moment of the game and log in later.

=== Fiction Fighters ===
Fiction Fighters was a new product, which became available in 2011, but was discontinued during its beta release due to massive lack of player's staying interest, despite a massive marketing campaign. It was an interactive 3D comic, where players entered a parallel comic universe. The players acted and interacted only in comic strips.

=== Panzer League ===
Panzer League was a mobile multiplayer online battle arena for tanks. To win the game the players had to destroy the opponents and defense systems before blowing up. Matches lasted 5 to 10 minutes. The game was available for Android and iOS devices. CipSoft ceased the operation of Panzer League on October 30, 2020, after more than 600,000 downloads.

=== LiteBringer ===
LiteBringer was a blockchain game developed by CipSoft, fully operating on the Litecoin blockchain. Released on September 15, 2020, LiteBringer offered a unique multiplayer experience with decentralized gameplay, where players had unprecedented control over their accounts and achievements. The game combined elements of a trading simulation and idle RPG, allowing players to level up fantasy characters, embark on quests, and manage resources directly on the blockchain. All in-game items and characters were stored on the Litecoin blockchain, enabling secure and direct transactions between players.

In March 2022, CipSoft announced the discontinuation of further development and active support for LiteBringer. Despite this, the game remains playable without trading fees or subscriptions, leveraging its decentralized architecture on the Litecoin network.

=== Persist Online ===
Persist Online is CipSoft's first MMORPG for PC since 1997. Announced in June 2024, the game features action-packed combat against zombies using firearms and melee weapons. It is designed as a true old-school MMORPG where hundreds of players interact on one server in a post-apocalyptic open world. The game will be available for Windows, macOS, and Linux via Steam and will initially be released as Early Access. A trailer and the game's Steam page were launched alongside the announcement.
