= Valve Anti-Cheat =

Anti-cheat software

- Developer: Valve
- Release: 2002
- Operating system: Windows, macOS, Linux
- Platform: Windows, Linux
- Type: Anti-cheat software
- License: Proprietary
- Website: help.steampowered.com

Valve Anti-Cheat (VAC) is an automated anti-cheat system developed by Valve and first released with Counter-Strike in 2002 to enforce rules in online multiplayer games distributed through the Steam platform. The system detects unauthorized modifications to a game, including third-party software designed to manipulate gameplay, as well as alterations to core game files such as executable programs and dynamic-link libraries. Modifications that provide an unfair advantage are classified as cheats and are subject to detection by VAC.

When cheat software is detected on a user's system, VAC issues a permanent ban preventing access to VAC-secured servers for the specific game involved. Bans are applied automatically and may result from various factors, most commonly the detection of known cheat signatures. Enforcement may occur days or even weeks after the initial detection, depending on the game and circumstances.

Valve does not disclose to the player the date of detection, the type of cheat identified, or the specific method by which the cheat was detected. VAC bans are typically permanent and non-negotiable, although Valve retains the ability to remove them in certain cases, such as confirmed false positives, through internal review.

During one week of November 2006, the system detected over 10,000 cheating attempts, and during the month of December 2018 over 600,000 accounts were banned.

== History ==
In 2001, Even Balance Inc., the developers of the anti-cheat software PunkBuster designed for Counter-Strike and Half-Life mods, stopped supporting the games as they had no support from Valve. Valve had also rejected business offers of integrating the technology directly into their games.

Valve started working on a "long-term solution" for cheating in 2001. VAC's initial release was with Counter-Strike in 2002. During this initial release, the system only banned players for 24 hours. The duration of the ban was increased over time; players were banned for 1 year and 5 years, until VAC2 was released in 2005, when any new bans became permanent. VAC2 was announced in February 2005 and began beta testing the following month. On November 17, 2006, they announced that "new [VAC] technology" had caught "over 10,000" cheating attempts in the preceding week alone.

During the early testing phase in 2002, some information was revealed about the program via the Half-Life Dedicated Server mailing lists. It can detect versions of "OGC's OpenGl Hack", can detect OpenGL cheats, and also detects CD key changers as cheats. Information on detected cheaters is sent to the ban list server on IP address 205.158.143.67 on port 27013, which was later changed to 27011. There is also a "master ban list" server. RAM/hardware errors detected by VAC may kick the player from the server, but not ban them.

Eric Smith and Nick Shaffner were the original contacts for game administrators. In February 2010, the VAC Team consisted of Steam's lead engineer John Cook and his team of 16 engineers.

In July 2010, several players who successfully used information leaked from Valve to increase their chances of finding a rare Team Fortress 2 weapon called the Golden Wrench were banned by VAC. During the same month, approximately 12,000 owners of Call of Duty: Modern Warfare 2 were banned when Steam updated a DLL file on disk after it had been loaded into memory by the game, causing a false positive detection. These bans were revoked and those affected received a free copy of Left 4 Dead 2 or an extra copy to send as a gift.

In February 2014, some users expressed concern that the system was monitoring websites they had visited by accessing their DNS cache. Gabe Newell responded via Reddit, stating that the purpose of the check was to act as a secondary counter-measure to detect kernel level cheats, and that it affected fewer than 0.1% of clients checked which resulted in 570 bans.

As of May 2016, the system began banning accounts that were registered with the same phone number. Additionally, a phone number that was used on an account at the time it was banned will not be allowed to be re-registered on other accounts for three months.

The system has been criticized for failing to detect LMAOBOX, a popular cheat program for Team Fortress 2, until May 2016, which resulted in a wave of bans.

In February 2017, Valve announced plans to introduce a machine-learning approach to detecting cheats in Counter-Strike: Global Offensive, and that an initial version of the system was already in place, which would automatically mark players for manual detection by players through the "Overwatch" system.

In March 2018, Valve publicized said machine-learning based approach in a talk at the Games Developer Conference, naming it VACNet.

In October 2023, certain users of AMD graphics cards were banned from Counter-Strike 2 after AMD added support for their "Anti-Lag+" feature via a driver update, which the game flagged as a cheat due to it detouring certain DLL functions. AMD subsequently withdrew the driver update and Valve pledged to unban any affected users. During the same month, Valve continued to mistakenly issue VAC bans to accounts for playing on Windows 7, shortly before undoing those same bans. Similarly, Valve also began issuing bans to users for excessively high mouse DPI settings.

== Design ==
Valve rarely discusses the software, as it may help cheaters write new code or conduct social engineering.

The software sends client challenges to the machine; if the appropriate response is not received, it is flagged as a possible violation. It uses Signature Scanning to detect possible cheats when scanning the computer's memory and processes. Whenever an anomaly is detected, an incident report is created and compared to a database of banned applications and/or analyzed by Valve engineers. The engineers may inspect the code and run it on their own copies of the game. If the code is confirmed as a new cheat, it is added to the database of cheat codes.

According to Steam's lead engineer John Cook, to stop the anti-cheat software itself from being exploited, "The software is constantly updated and sent down in small portions for the servers as needed, so hackers only get to see small portions of it running at any particular time. So while they may be able to work around pieces of it, they can never hack everything."

Valve also accepts submissions of cheat programs and cheat websites from players by email. Players may also report players they suspect of cheating through their Steam Community profile, although players are not banned from these reports alone.

If a cheat is found, the player's Steam account will be flagged as cheating immediately, but the player will not receive any indication of the detection. It is only after a delay of "days or even weeks" that the account is permanently banned from "VAC Secure" servers for that game, possibly along with other games that use the same engine (e.g. Valve's Source games, GoldSrc games, Unreal Engine games). Valve never discloses which cheat was detected. Players have criticized the system for taking weeks to months to ban cheaters.

Large numbers of flagged accounts may also be banned in "waves" or “VAC waves”.

=== Additional restrictions ===
Players that are banned face additional restrictions. Steam Family Sharing allows users to share their video game library with another Steam user to download and play, but games that the player is VAC banned from cannot be shared. If a user shares their games with another user, then cheats or fraud are detected on the recipient's account, the original owner of the games being shared may be VAC banned and the sharing function revoked. Banned users also cannot contribute to the Steam Translation Server project, that allows users to contribute new translations of Steam and its games. Users banned from a game are not allowed to refund it.

Over 100 games support VAC; players that are banned from the following games face additional restrictions:

- Call of Duty: Modern Warfare 2#
- Call of Duty: Modern Warfare 3#
- Counter-Strike (video game)†
- Counter-Strike: Condition Zero†
- Counter-Strike: Source‡
- Counter-Strike 2§
- Day of Defeat†
- Day of Defeat: Source‡
- Deathmatch Classic†
- Half-Life 2: Deathmatch‡
- Half-Life Deathmatch: Source‡
- Ricochet†
- Team Fortress 2‡§
- Team Fortress Classic†

Mods based on the games above may inherit VAC support from the host game.

^{†} Denotes GoldSrc games, if a player is banned in one of these games they are banned from all of them.
^{‡} Denotes Source engine games, if a player is banned in one of these games they are banned from all of them.
^{#} Denotes games that have a stricter policy of having all servers VAC protected, and additionally bans players for editing of any game files except config files.
^{§} Denotes games that face digital goods restrictions and or revocation.

== Social impact ==
The user's Steam profile is also marked with "ban(s) on record", which is publicly visible and cannot be hidden, regardless of the profile visibility of the banned account. An analysis of 43,465 users that had been banned between April 2011 and October 2011 showed that the more VAC banned players a user is friends with, the more likely they will also be VAC banned themselves in the future. After they were banned, they lost more friends, were more likely to increase their privacy settings and also had more VAC banned friends than non-banned players. Banned players are also sometimes referred to as going on "VACation".

Banned players are also excluded from competing in most electronic sports tournaments. In 2014, professional player Joel "Emilio" Mako was banned during a live stream; he initially denied using a cheat, claiming it was caused by "a friend of his played on one of his smurfing accounts which mail is linked to his main account". Then in 2015, he admitted to using a cheat. Hovik "KQLY" Tovmassian, Simon "smn" Beck and Gordon "SF" Giry were banned shortly before they were scheduled to play at DreamHack Winter 2014. The ESEA League claimed the bans were a result of working with Valve directly. Simon "smn" Beck and Hovik "KQLY" Tovmassian both admitted to using cheats.

In March 2020, Elias "Jamppi" Olkkonen filed a lawsuit against Valve, alleging that a lifetime VAC ban negatively affected his esports career, specifically his inability to play in Valve-sanctioned Major tournaments, which subsequently prevented him from signing onto the esports team OG. The VAC-ban is tied to an account which he previously owned when he was 14, and then sold to a friend who incurred the ban; the lawsuit alleges that a lifelong VAC ban for a minor, particularly without the ability to first plead his case, is unreasonable.

A few users used to collect VAC bans, but this was eventually made less prolific as Valve updated the VAC ban message shown on the user's profile, now showing "Multiple VAC bans on record" instead of the actual number of VAC bans.

== See also ==
- BattlEye
- Riot Vanguard
