= Kernel-level anti-cheat =

Type of video game anti-cheat

Kernel-level anti-cheats are a type of video game anti-cheat that run at a lower system level than regular processes, making it harder for cheats to avoid detection. Kernel-level monitoring has received much criticism from cybersecurity experts since they require the highest level of trust. Supporters argue that kernel-level access is necessary to detect sophisticated cheats that operate at the same privilege level.

== Technology ==
Privilege rings for the x86 architecture. Kernel-level anti-cheats operate in Ring 0

Kernel-level anti-cheat systems are software mechanisms that operate within an operating system's kernel space (Ring 0) in order to detect and prevent unauthorized modification of video game processes. Unlike user-mode anti-cheat systems, which operate at the same privilege level as standard applications (Ring 3), kernel-level implementations use privileged drivers to monitor system activity at a lower level.

Kernel-level anti-cheat systems have historically had limited support on Linux. Differences in driver signing requirements, kernel module policies, and the decentralized nature of Linux distributions can complicate the deployment of proprietary kernel drivers compared to Windows, where driver signing and distribution are centrally managed by Microsoft.

Because kernel-level systems have such a high level of trust, any software that wants to enter kernel space (running Windows) must be digitally signed according to Microsoft's driver signing requirements. It is possible to disable these requirements, but anti-cheats detect this and prevent the game from running.

== Support and rationale ==
Conventional anti-cheats run in user mode with limited access. These anti-cheats may be unable to reliably detect and intercept kernel-mode cheats. By running in Ring 0, kernel-level systems can observe low-level system calls, drivers, and memory interactions that would otherwise be inaccessible to user-mode applications.

Game developers have stated that kernel-level anti-cheat mechanisms are intended to preserve competitive integrity, particularly in online multiplayer environments where cheating can undermine matchmaking systems, ranked play, and esports competition.

== Security ==
Code signed drivers are susceptible to vulnerabilities like any other software. However, the elevated privilege required by kernel-level anti-cheats amplifies the impact of any vulnerability found. In one reported case, the anti-cheat driver mhyprot2.sys used by Genshin Impact was abused by ransomware actors to disable antivirus software.

Vulnerable kernel-level drivers were also the cause of the 2024 CrowdStrike-related IT outages.

== See also ==
- Rootkit
- Kernel (operating system)
- Cheating in online games
- Digital rights management
