= Rising Storm (video game) =

2013 video game

- Developer: Tripwire Interactive
- Publisher: Tripwire Interactive
- Engine: Unreal Engine 3
- Platform: Microsoft Windows
- Release: May 30, 2013
- Genres: First-person shooter, tactical shooter
- Mode: Multiplayer

Rising Storm is a 2013 multiplayer first-person shooter game and a standalone expansion pack to Red Orchestra 2: Heroes of Stalingrad. It was developed by Tripwire Interactive in conjunction with the modding community. The title focuses on the Pacific campaign of World War II. Announced in May 2010, the game was scheduled for release in 2013. The beta went live on May 8 that year. A sequel, titled Rising Storm 2: Vietnam, was released in 2017.

== Gameplay ==
Rising Storm is a realistic first-person shooter. All of the core gameplay mechanics from Red Orchestra 2 are present, such as the cover system and bullet drop. Rising Storm brings in a whole new arsenal of weapons that relate to the American and Japanese weaponry used in the Pacific Theater, such as the M1 Garand and the Type 38 rifle. Gameplay has been described by Tripwire as asymmetrical, due to the Japanese having inferior weaponry to the Americans to maintain historical accuracy. To balance the teams out, the Japanese are given the Knee Mortar, along with the ability to plant grenades as booby traps, and being able to launch Banzai charges at the Americans, which in turn deals suppression onto the Americans while the Japanese suffer less from suppression themselves.

Rising Storm features four playable factions, including the United States Marine Corps, the U.S. Army, the Imperial Japanese Army, and the Special Naval Landing Forces. The game takes the player around the Pacific with maps varying from the Battle of Peleliu, with a desert-island type environment, to the Battle of Saipan at Charan Kanoa, an urban environment, to the Battle of Iwo Jima and the like.

Rising Storm also comes with all multiplayer content from Red Orchestra 2: Heroes of Stalingrad.

On September 26, 2013, the Island assault content pack was added, bring with it a multiplayer campaign previously seen in Red Orchestra 2: Heroes of Stalingrad.

In November 2014, a new free content update was released, featuring a new map and changes to some other maps. The new map was Demyansk.

In September 2014, the Armored Assault free content update was released, adding in two new maps, Kobura and Tula outskirts, and two new tanks, the Soviet T-70 Light tank and the German Panzer III Medium tank. A new weapon was also added in, the MG-42 German machine gun. The update also changed the map Arad 2, which was updated to showcase the T-70 and Panzer III tanks.

== Development ==
First announced on May 18, 2010, Rising Storm was developed between Tripwire Interactive and the modding community.

== Reception ==
Rising Storm earned a positive reception from fans and media alike. PC Gamer magazine gave it a rating of 86/100, calling it "a gritty, brutal WWII shooter that uses its scale, setting, and fidelity to great effect." The game has a critic score of 82 and a user score of 84 on review aggregator Metacritic.

== Sequel ==
Rising Storm 2: Vietnam is a sequel to Rising Storm and focuses on the Vietnam War. It was developed by Tripwire Interactive and Antimatter Games. Announced on June 17, 2015, the game was released May 30, 2017.
