= Rising Storm 2: Vietnam =

2017 video game

- Developers: Antimatter Games; Tripwire Interactive
- Publishers: Tripwire Interactive; Iceberg Interactive
- Producers: Jack Hackett; Toby Ellis; Mike Stone
- Designers: Sturt Jeffery; Adam Hatch
- Programmers: Sturt Jeffery; Andrew Ladenberger
- Writers: Jack Hackett; Toby Ellis
- Composers: Lennie Moore; Chris Rickwood
- Engine: Unreal Engine 3
- Platform: Microsoft Windows
- Release: May 30, 2017
- Genres: Tactical shooter, first-person shooter
- Mode: Multiplayer

Rising Storm 2: Vietnam is a 2017 multiplayer tactical first-person shooter video game developed by Antimatter Games and Tripwire Interactive and co-published by Tripwire Interactive and Iceberg Interactive. It is a direct sequel to 2013's Rising Storm and is set during the Vietnam War. The game was released worldwide for Microsoft Windows through digital distribution platform Steam on May 30, 2017.

== Gameplay ==
Like its predecessors in the series, Rising Storm 2: Vietnam is a tactical first-person shooter that emphasizes large-scale teamwork with realistic mechanics and combat. The game is set in the period of the Vietnam War, and many of the locations are based on historic battles. Players can make use of era-specific weapons, including automatic and semi-automatic rifles, artillery, flamethrowers, and machine guns.

Rising Storm 2: Vietnam's multiplayer pits up to 64 players against one another from either the South or the North in the Vietnam War conflict. Each faction features unique Roles and abilities, making the game asymmetrical. Players can choose between the National Liberation Front (NLF/VC) and the North Vietnamese Army (PAVN/NVA), against the United States Army, the United States Marine Corps, the Australian Army, and the Army of the Republic of Vietnam (ARVN).

For the first time in the franchise, players are able to take control of airborne vehicles, including attack, reconnaissance, and transport helicopters. Weapon and character customization also mark their debuts, including weapon and munition varieties as well as head, upper and lower body and skin customization.

=== Multiplayer modes ===
The game launched with eight maps and three modes; Territories, Supremacy, and Skirmish.

- Territories: One of the standard two-round game modes in the series. In order to win, the attacking team must capture all of the objectives on the map before the round ends. The defenders win a round if they can hold on to their besieged objectives long enough to break the assault and successfully enter lockdown. If attackers are contesting any objective when the lockdown timer runs out or the last objective when the round timer runs out, the game enters overtime. Additionally, one or both teams can enter sudden death if their reinforcement tickets have been depleted, which disables respawning. The last team standing wins. A team can win the game by tie breaker if they have captured more objectives (first tiebreaker) or have more reinforcement tickets remaining (second tiebreaker) at the end of the two-round match.
- Supremacy: A new mode featured in the franchise. Teams capture objectives across the map, earning points based on the number of objectives they hold. A team wins the game if they achieve a greater score. Sudden death and tie breaker are also applied.
- Vincent's Mode: A new mode added in update 1.6.2, the Vincent mode comes bundled with a map featuring a singular point of contact between the opposing north and south teams; the Vincent's House. Vincent mode also features two new forces, Camerons (north force) and Calebs (south force). Another notable feature is the lack of reinforcement budget and trap limit. The mode may only be accessed through the use of console commands.
- Skirmish: A different take on Supremacy with up to five rounds and featuring smaller maps for official eight versus eight player teams. Players must seize all objectives on the map and deplete the enemy's spawn tickets within the timer. Taking over an objective will replenish spawns.
- Campaign: Returning from Red Orchestra 2: Heroes of Stalingrad and Rising Storm, Campaign has both teams battle each other through Territories matches to gain territory on a map of South Vietnam over an 11-year period. In order to secure victory, the winning team must either acquire and hold all territories or hold a greater number of victory points by the end of the campaign. Defeat in the campaign can result from mismanaging and depleting the team's combat power.

== Development ==
Rising Storm 2: Vietnam was announced at the E3 2015, alongside an announcement trailer. It was being developed by Antimatter Games, the studio founded by the team who made the first Rising Storm.

The game introduces several features new to the franchise including stealth, tunneling and player-controlled military helicopters. Players earn cosmetics as they level up to customize their soldiers for each faction.

Rising Storm 2: Vietnam went into open beta from May 19 to May 22, 2017, and was officially released for the PC using the software distribution platform Steam on May 30, 2017.

=== Music ===
Chris Rickwood and Lennie Moore have returned to score the soundtrack for Rising Storm 2: Vietnam. They were previously employed by Tripwire Interactive to compose the music for 2013's Red Orchestra: Rising Storm. Tripwire also licensed the song "Run Through the Jungle" by Creedence Clearwater Revival.

== Downloadable content ==
Users were able to pre-purchase the Digital Deluxe edition of the game from April 27 to May 30, 2017. The Digital Deluxe came with two exclusive camouflage boonie hats and the official soundtrack.

On September 2, 2017, Tripwire announced that a DLC adding Australian forces was in the works, with an anticipated release date at the end of the year.

On November 27, 2017, The "Pulling Rank" Cosmetic DLC was added to the game, adding new cosmetic items only available to purchasers, and an early unlock.

On April 2, 2020, the (fan made) Talvisota: Winter War Mod was released on Steam, which takes place in the Winter War of 1939–1940 between Finland and Soviet Union.

== Reception ==
=== Critical reception ===
Reception

Aggregate score
Aggregator	Score
Metacritic	81/100

Review scores
Publication	Score
GameRevolution	4/5
PC Gamer (US)	85/100

Rising Storm 2: Vietnam received generally favorable reviews, according to video game review aggregator Metacritic.

== Successor ==
In 2019, a team of Tripwire Interactive developers separated to form Antimatter Games, and announced that they had begun work on '83, a combined-arms tactical first-person shooter set in an alternative history where World War III has begun, developed as a spiritual successor to Rising Storm 2: Vietnam The game is being developed in Unreal Engine 5. In 2023, development was postponed due to publisher issues, but EG7 later licensed the rights to Blue Dot Games to continue development. The game entered a Closed Alpha Test in December 2023. It was released on Early Access in April 2026.

== See also ==
- List of Vietnam War games
