= List of Koei Tecmo games =

This is a list of video games developed and/or published by Koei Tecmo. Some games were only published by Koei Tecmo in a specific region or for a specific platform; these games will only list the publisher relevant to this list and will be notated appropriately. Also, many games have different release dates for different regions, platforms, or re-releases. For the purposes of simplicity, and to ensure easy automated sorting, only the earliest date will listed on this table.

Year	Title	Developer	Publisher	Platforms
2027	The Apothecary Diaries: The False Imperial Brother	Gust	Koei Tecmo	Microsoft Windows, Nintendo Switch, Nintendo Switch 2, PlayStation 5
2014	Ar Nosurge	Gust	Tecmo Koei	PlayStation 3, PlayStation Vita
2015	Arslan: The Warriors of Legend	Omega Force	Koei Tecmo	PlayStation 3, PlayStation 4, Xbox One, Microsoft Windows
2012	Atelier Ayesha: The Alchemist of Dusk	Gust	Koei Tecmo	PlayStation 3, PlayStation Vita
2012	Atelier Elkrone: Dear for Otomate	Gust	Koei Tecmo	PlayStation Portable
2013	Atelier Escha & Logy: Alchemists of the Dusk Sky	Gust	Koei Tecmo	PlayStation 3, PlayStation Vita
2016	Atelier Firis: The Alchemist and the Mysterious Journey	Gust	Koei Tecmo	PlayStation 4, PlayStation Vita, Microsoft Windows
2027	Atelier Karia: The Night Kingdom & the Guide of Memories	Gust	Koei Tecmo	Nintendo Switch 2, Microsoft Windows, PlayStation 5, Xbox Series X/S
2017	Atelier Lydie & Soeur: Alchemists of the Mysterious Painting	Gust	Koei Tecmo	Microsoft Windows, PlayStation 4, PlayStation Vita, Nintendo Switch
2009	Atelier Lina: The Alchemist of Strahl	Gust	Koei Tecmo	Nintendo DS
2007	Atelier Lise: The Alchemist of Orde	Gust	Koei Tecmo	Nintendo DS
2019	Atelier Lulua: The Scion of Arland	Gust	Koei Tecmo	PlayStation 4, Nintendo Switch, Microsoft Windows
2023	Atelier Marie Remake: The Alchemist of Salburg	Gust	Koei Tecmo	PlayStation 4, PlayStation 5, Nintendo Switch, Microsoft Windows
2011	Atelier Meruru: The Apprentice of Arland	Gust	Tecmo Koei	PlayStation 3, PlayStation Vita, PlayStation 4, Nintendo Switch
2018	Atelier Online: Alchemists of the Brasier	Gust	Koei Tecmo	Android, iOS
2014	Atelier Questboard	Gust	Koei Tecmo	Android, iOS
2025	Atelier Resleriana: The Red Alchemist & the White Guardian	Gust	Koei Tecmo	Nintendo Switch, PlayStation 4, PlayStation 5, Microsoft Windows
2019	Atelier Ryza: Ever Darkness & the Secret Hideout	Gust	Koei Tecmo	Nintendo Switch, PlayStation 4, Microsoft Windows
2020	Atelier Ryza 2: Lost Legends & the Secret Fairy	Gust	Koei Tecmo	Nintendo Switch, PlayStation 4, PlayStation 5, Microsoft Windows
2022	Atelier Sophie 2: The Alchemist of the Mysterious Dream	Gust	Koei Tecmo	Nintendo Switch, PlayStation 4, Microsoft Windows
2023	Atelier Ryza 3: Alchemist of the End & the Secret Key	Gust	Koei Tecmo	Nintendo Switch, PlayStation 4, PlayStation 5, Microsoft Windows
2014	Atelier Shallie: Alchemists of the Dusk Sea	Gust	Koei Tecmo	PlayStation 3, PlayStation Vita
2015	Atelier Sophie: The Alchemist of the Mysterious Book	Gust	Koei Tecmo	PlayStation 3, PlayStation Vita
2010	Atelier Totori: The Adventurer of Arland	Gust	Tecmo Koei	PlayStation 3, PlayStation Vita, PlayStation 4, Nintendo Switch
2025	Atelier Yumia: The Alchemist of Memories & the Envisioned Land	Gust	Koei Tecmo	Nintendo Switch, Nintendo Switch 2, Microsoft Windows, PlayStation 4, PlayStation 5, Xbox One, Xbox Series X/S
2016	Attack on Titan	Omega Force	Koei Tecmo	Microsoft Windows, PlayStation 4, PlayStation 3, PlayStation Vita, Xbox One
2018	Attack on Titan 2	Omega Force	Koei Temco	Nintendo Switch, Microsoft Windows, PlayStation 4, PlayStation Vita, Xbox One
2026	Attack on Titan 3	Omega Force	Koei Tecmo	Nintendo Switch 2, Microsoft Windows, PlayStation 5, Xbox Series X/S
2017	Attack on Titan: Escape from Certain Death	Ruby Party	Koei Tecmo	Nintendo 3DS
2016	Berserk and the Band of the Hawk	Omega Force	Koei Tecmo	PlayStation 3, PlayStation 4, PlayStation Vita, Microsoft Windows
2015	Bladestorm: Nightmare	Omega Force	Koei Tecmo	PlayStation 4, Xbox One
2017	Blue Reflection	Gust	Koei Tecmo	PlayStation 4, PlayStation Vita
2026	Blue Reflection Quartet	Gust	Koei Tecmo	Nintendo Switch, Nintendo Switch 2, Microsoft Windows, PlayStation 5
2021	Buddy Mission Bond	Ruby Party	Nintendo	Nintendo Switch
2011	Champion Jockey: G1 Jockey & Gallop Racer	Tecmo Koei	Tecmo Koei	PlayStation 3, Wii, Xbox 360
2017	Champion Jockey Special	Kou Shibusawa	Koei Tecmo	Nintendo Switch
2012	Ciel Nosurge	Gust	Tecmo Koei	PlayStation Vita
2014	Daikoukai Jidai V: Road to Zipang	Koei Tecmo	Koei Tecmo	Microsoft Windows
2019	Daikoukai Jidai VI	Kou Shibusawa	Koei Tecmo	iOS, Android
2012	Dead or Alive 5	Team Ninja	Tecmo Koei	PlayStation 3, Xbox 360, PlayStation Vita
2015	Dead or Alive 5 Last Round	Team Ninja	Koei Tecmo	PlayStation 3, PlayStation 4, Xbox 360, Xbox One, Microsoft Windows, Arcade
2013	Dead or Alive 5 Ultimate	Team Ninja	Tecmo Koei	PlayStation 3, Xbox 360
2019	Dead or Alive 6	Team Ninja	Koei Tecmo	PlayStation 4, Xbox One, Microsoft Windows
2026	Dead or Alive 6 Last Round	Team Ninja	Koei Tecmo	PlayStation 5, Xbox Series X/S, Microsoft Windows
Cancelled	Dead or Alive: Code Chronos	Team Ninja	Tecmo Koei	Xbox 360
2011	Dead or Alive: Dimensions	Team Ninja	Tecmo Koei	Nintendo 3DS
2010	Dead or Alive Paradise	Team Ninja	Tecmo Koei	PlayStation Portable
2016	Dead or Alive Xtreme 3	Team Ninja	Koei Tecmo	PlayStation 4, PlayStation Vita
2014	Deception IV: Blood Ties	Tecmo Koei	Tecmo Koei	PlayStation Vita, PlayStation 3
2015	Deception IV: The Nightmare Princess	Tecmo Koei	Tecmo Koei	PlayStation Vita, PlayStation 3, PlayStation 4
2014	Derby Musou	Tecmo Koei	Tecmo Koei	Microsoft Windows
2018	Dissidia Final Fantasy NT	Team Ninja	Square Enix	PlayStation 4
2026	Dynasty Warriors 3: Complete Edition Remastered	Omega Force	Koei Tecmo	Nintendo Switch 2, Microsoft Windows, PlayStation 5, Xbox Series X/S
2013	Dynasty Warriors 8	Omega Force	Tecmo Koei	PlayStation 3, Xbox 360, Microsoft Windows
2014	Dynasty Warriors 8: Empires	Omega Force	Koei Tecmo	PlayStation 3, PlayStation 4, Xbox One, Microsoft Windows, Nintendo Switch
2013	Dynasty Warriors 8: Xtreme Legends	Omega Force	Koei Tecmo	PlayStation 3, PlayStation 4, Microsoft Windows
2018	Dynasty Warriors 9	Omega Force	Koei Tecmo	PlayStation 4, Xbox One, Microsoft Windows
2022	Dynasty Warriors 9 Empires	Omega Force	Koei Tecmo	PlayStation 4, Xbox One, Microsoft Windows, Nintendo Switch
2016	Dynasty Warriors: Godseekers	Omega Force	Koei Tecmo	PlayStation 3, PlayStation 4, PlayStation Vita
2013	Dynasty Warriors: Gundam Reborn	Omega Force	Bandai Namco Entertainment	PlayStation 3, PlayStation Vita
2014	Dynasty Warriors Online	Omega Force	Tecmo Koei	PlayStation 4, PlayStation Vita
2025	Dynasty Warriors: Origins	Omega Force	Koei Tecmo	PlayStation 5, Xbox Series X/S, Microsoft Windows
2017	Dynasty Warriors: Unleashed	Nexon	Koei Tecmo	iOS, Android
2020	Fairy Tail	Gust	Koei Tecmo	PlayStation 4, Nintendo Switch, Microsoft Windows
2024	Fairy Tail 2	Gust	Koei Tecmo	PlayStation 4, PlayStation 5, Nintendo Switch, Microsoft Windows
2023	Fatal Frame: Mask of the Lunar Eclipse	Koei Tecmo	Koei Tecmo	Nintendo Switch, PlayStation 4, PlayStation 5, Microsoft Windows, Xbox One, Xbox Series X/S
2014	Fatal Frame: Maiden of the Black Water	Koei Tecmo	Koei Tecmo	Wii U, Nintendo Switch, PlayStation 4, PlayStation 5, Windows, Xbox One, Xbox Series X/S
2023	Fate/Samurai Remnant	Omega Force	Koei Tecmo	Nintendo Switch, PlayStation 4, PlayStation 5, Microsoft Windows
2017	Fire Emblem Warriors	Omega Force, Team Ninja	JP: Koei Tecmo WW: Nintendo	Nintendo Switch, New Nintendo 3DS
2019	Fire Emblem: Three Houses	Intelligent Systems, Kou Shibusawa	Nintendo	Nintendo Switch
2022	Fire Emblem Warriors: Three Hopes	Omega Force, Team Ninja	JP: Koei Tecmo WW: Nintendo	Nintendo Switch
2010	Fist of the North Star: Ken's Rage	Omega Force	Tecmo Koei	PlayStation 3, Xbox 360
2012	Fist of the North Star: Ken's Rage 2	Koei	Tecmo Koei	PlayStation 3, Xbox 360, Wii U
2013	Geten no Hana	Ruby Party	Koei Tecmo	PlayStation Portable, PlayStation Vita
2015	Harukanaru Toki no Naka de 6	Ruby Party	Koei Tecmo	PlayStation Portable, PlayStation Vita
2018	Nobunaga's Ambition: Nyapuri!	Koei Tecmo	Koei Tecmo	iOS, Android
2014	Hyrule Warriors	Omega Force, Team Ninja	Koei Tecmo	Wii U
2016	Hyrule Warriors Legends	Omega Force, Team Ninja	Koei Tecmo	Nintendo 3DS
2018	Hyrule Warriors: Definitive Edition	Omega Force, Team Ninja	Koei Tecmo	Nintendo Switch
2020	Hyrule Warriors: Age of Calamity	Omega Force	JP: Koei Tecmo WW: Nintendo	Nintendo Switch
2025	Hyrule Warriors: Age of Imprisonment	AAA Games Studio	JP: Koei Tecmo WW: Nintendo	Nintendo Switch 2
2014	Kin'iro no Corda 3 AnotherSky feat. Amane Gakuen	Ruby Party	Koei Tecmo	PlayStation Portable, PlayStation Vita
2014	Kin'iro no Corda 3 AnotherSky feat. Jinnan	Ruby Party	Koei Tecmo	PlayStation Portable, PlayStation Vita
2014	Kin'iro no Corda 3 AnotherSky feat. Shiseikan	Ruby Party	Koei Tecmo	PlayStation Portable, PlayStation Vita
2013	Kin'iro no Corda 3: Full Voice Special	Ruby Party	Koei Tecmo	PlayStation Portable, Nintendo 3DS, PlayStation Vita
2016	Kin'iro no Corda 4	Ruby Party	Koei Tecmo	PlayStation Vita
2017	Kin'iro no Corda Octave	Ruby Party	Koei Tecmo	Mobile phones
2019	Marvel Ultimate Alliance 3: The Black Order	Team Ninja	Nintendo	Nintendo Switch
2010	Metroid: Other M	Team Ninja/Nintendo	Nintendo	Wii
2019	Nelke & the Legendary Alchemists: Ateliers of the New World	Gust	Koei Tecmo	Microsoft Windows, PlayStation 4, PlayStation Vita, Nintendo Switch
2015	Nights of Azure	Gust	Koei Tecmo	PlayStation 3, PlayStation 4, PlayStation Vita, Microsoft Windows
2017	Nights of Azure 2: Bride of the New Moon	Gust	Koei Tecmo	PlayStation 3, PlayStation 4, PlayStation Vita, Microsoft Windows, Nintendo Switch
2025	Ninja Gaiden II: Black	Team Ninja	Koei Tecmo	Microsoft Windows, PlayStation 5, Xbox Series
2012	Ninja Gaiden 3	Team Ninja	Tecmo Koei	PlayStation 3, Xbox 360
2012	Ninja Gaiden 3: Razor's Edge	Team Ninja	Tecmo Koei	Wii U, PlayStation 3, Xbox 360
Cancelled	Ninja Gaiden 3DS	Team Ninja	Tecmo Koei	Nintendo 3DS
2025	Ninja Gaiden 4	Team Ninja, PlatinumGames	Xbox Game Studios	Microsoft Windows, PlayStation 5, Xbox Series
2021	Ninja Gaiden: Master Collection	Team Ninja	Koei Tecmo	PlayStation 4, Nintendo Switch, Xbox One, Microsoft Windows
2017	Nioh	Team Ninja	Sony Interactive Entertainment, Koei Tecmo	PlayStation 4, PlayStation 5, Microsoft Windows
2020	Nioh 2	Team Ninja	Sony Interactive Entertainment, Koei Tecmo	PlayStation 4, PlayStation 5, Microsoft Windows
2017	Nobunaga's Ambition: Taishi	Kou Shibusawa	Koei Tecmo	Microsoft Windows, PlayStation 4, Nintendo Switch
2012	One Piece: Pirate Warriors	Omega Force	Bandai Namco Games	PlayStation 3
2013	One Piece: Pirate Warriors 2	Omega Force	Bandai Namco Games	PlayStation 3, PlayStation Vita
2015	One Piece: Pirate Warriors 3	Omega Force	Bandai Namco Entertainment	PlayStation 3, PlayStation Vita, PlayStation 4, Microsoft Windows
2020	One Piece: Pirate Warriors 4	Omega Force	Bandai Namco Entertainment	PlayStation 4, Microsoft Windows, Nintendo Switch, Xbox One
2020	Persona 5 Strikers	Omega Force, P-Studio	Atlus	Nintendo Switch, PlayStation 4, Microsoft Windows
2012	Pokémon Conquest	Tecmo Koei	The Pokémon Company, Nintendo	Nintendo DS
Cancelled	Project Progressive	Team Ninja	Tecmo	Xbox 360
2012	Project Zero 2: Wii Edition	Tecmo Koei	Nintendo	Wii
2024	Rise of the Rōnin	Team Ninja	Sony Interactive Entertainment, Koei Tecmo	PlayStation 5, Windows
2016	Romance of the Three Kingdoms XIII	Kou Shibusawa	Koei Tecmo	PlayStation 3, PlayStation 4, Xbox One, Microsoft Windows
2016	Samurai Warriors: Spirit of Sanada	Omega Force	Koei Tecmo	PlayStation 3, PlayStation 4, PlayStation Vita, Microsoft Windows, Nintendo Switch
2014	Samurai Warriors 4	Omega Force	Koei Tecmo	PlayStation 3, PlayStation 4, PlayStation Vita
2014	Samurai Warriors 4-II	Omega Force	Koei Tecmo	PlayStation 3, PlayStation 4, PlayStation Vita, Microsoft Windows
2015	Samurai Warriors 4: Empires	Omega Force	Koei Tecmo	PlayStation 3, PlayStation 4, PlayStation Vita
2017	Sangokushi Legion	Koei Tecmo	Koei Tecmo	iOS, Android
2014	Sengoku Musou Shoot	Tecmo Koei	Tecmo Koei	iOS, Android
2018	Shin Sangokushi	Koei Tecmo	Koei Tecmo	iOS, Android
2018	Shin Sangokumusō Vs	Koei Tecmo	Koei Tecmo	Nintendo 3DS
2012	Spirit Camera: The Cursed Memoir	Tecmo Koei	Nintendo	Nintendo 3DS
2022	Stranger of Paradise: Final Fantasy Origin	Team Ninja	Square Enix	Microsoft Windows, PlayStation 4, PlayStation 5, Xbox One, Xbox Series X/S.
2025	Three Kingdoms Heroes	Koei Tecmo	Koei Tecmo	iOS, macOS, tvOS
2014	Toukiden: Kiwami	Omega Force	Tecmo Koei	PlayStation Portable, PlayStation Vita, PlayStation 4, Microsoft Windows
2013	Toukiden: The Age of Demons	Omega Force	Tecmo Koei	PlayStation Portable, PlayStation Vita
2016	Toukiden 2	Omega Force	Koei Tecmo	PlayStation 3, PlayStation 4, PlayStation Vita
2025	Venus Vacation Prism: Dead or Alive Xtreme	Team Ninja	Koei Tecmo	PlayStation 4, PlayStation 5, Microsoft Windows
2025	Warriors: Abyss	Omega Force	Koei Tecmo	PlayStation 4, PlayStation 5, Xbox Series X/S, Microsoft Windows, Nintendo Switch
2017	Warriors All-Stars	Omega Force	Koei Tecmo	PlayStation 4, PlayStation Vita, Microsoft Windows
2018	Warriors Orochi 4	Omega Force	Koei Tecmo	Microsoft Windows, PlayStation 4, Xbox One, Nintendo Switch
2011	Warriors: Legends of Troy	Koei Canada	Tecmo Koei	PlayStation 3, Xbox 360
2023	Wild Hearts	Omega Force	Electronic Arts, Koei Tecmo	PlayStation 5, Microsoft Windows, Xbox Series X/S, Nintendo Switch 2
2017	Winning Post 8 2017	Koei Tecmo	Koei Tecmo	PlayStation 3, PlayStation 4, PlayStation Vita, Microsoft Windows, Nintendo Switch
2018	Winning Post 8 2018	Koei Tecmo	Koei Tecmo	PlayStation 4, PlayStation Vita, Microsoft Windows, Nintendo Switch
2019	Winning Post 9	Kou Shibusawa	Koei Tecmo	Nintendo Switch
2009	Winning Post World	Tecmo Koei	Tecmo Koei	PlayStation 2, PlayStation 3, Microsoft Windows, Wii
2010	Winning Post World 2010	Tecmo Koei	Tecmo Koei	PlayStation 2, PlayStation 3, Xbox 360, Wii
2014	Winning Post World 8	Koei Tecmo	Koei Tecmo	PlayStation 3, PlayStation 4, PlayStation Vita, Microsoft Windows
2023	Wo Long: Fallen Dynasty	Team Ninja	Koei Tecmo	Microsoft Windows, PlayStation 4, PlayStation 5, Xbox One, Xbox Series X/S.
2027	Wo Long 2: Wings of Ember	Team Ninja	Koei Tecmo	Nintendo Switch 2, Microsoft Windows, PlayStation 5, Xbox Series X/S
2014	Yaiba: Ninja Gaiden Z	Team Ninja	Tecmo	PlayStation 3, Xbox 360, Microsoft Windows
2016	Yo-kai Sangokushi	Level-5, Koei Tecmo	Level-5	Nintendo 3DS
2018	Yo-kai Sangokushi: Kunitori Wars	Level-5, Koei Tecmo	Level-5	iOS, Android

== See also ==
- List of Koei games
- List of Tecmo games
