= Mana Khemia 2: Fall of Alchemy =

2008 video game

- Developer: Gust Co. Ltd.
- Publishers: JP: Gust Co. Ltd.; NA: NIS America
- Series: Atelier
- Platforms: PlayStation 2, PlayStation Portable, PlayStation Network
- Release: PlayStation 2: JP: May 29, 2008; NA: August 25, 2009; PSP: JP: October 1, 2009; PlayStation Network: JP: June 27, 2013
- Genre: Role-playing
- Mode: Single-player

Mana Khemia 2: Fall of Alchemy (Note: Japanese: マナケミア2 〜おちた学園と錬金術士たち〜, Hepburn: Mana Kemia 2 ~Ochita Gakuen to Renkinjutsushi-tachi~; lit. Mana Khemia 2: The Fallen Academy and the Alchemists) is a role-playing video game developed by Japanese developer Gust Co. Ltd. for the PlayStation 2. A "Portable+" version for PlayStation Portable was released on 1 October 2009 (Japan only). The game is the direct sequel to Mana Khemia: Alchemists of Al-Revis, as well as the tenth installment to the Atelier series.

== Gameplay ==
Mana Khemia 2 is classified as a console role-playing video game and is a direct sequel to Mana Khemia: Alchemists of Al-Revis also created by Gust.

Like its predecessor, the core of this game focuses on alchemy through which players can create items, weapons, armors and accessories to be used throughout the duration of the game. These alchemy recipes can be attained through field explorations, completing certain jobs or bought in shops. Each item has its own special properties, from elemental attributes to special skills (called "Common Skills") which are useful during battle. Like the previous installment, the quality of an item depends on its "Ether Level" which starts at 50 and can either increase or decrease according to the selected elemental attributes on the "alchemy wheel." New recipes can be derived from older ones depending on the ingredient selected during item creation.

In the field, players are confronted by visible monsters. Once the player bumps into a monster, one of the four PlayStation controller buttons will be displayed. If the player manages to quickly input the corresponding button, the player gets an advantage in battle allowing the characters to strike first. Unlike the first Mana Khemia, players will only have five permanent characters in their group (three in the active party, two/three in reserve), the sixth being a "Guest" character which will only participate during certain events. Guests are playable during battle but feature inaccessible equipment and status parameters. Players can call in the reserve characters for an extra attack or to defend against an incoming attack. The switched-out character will have to wait a certain amount of time before being available to switch again.

As more hits are inflicted upon the enemies, the battle gauge will build up; "Unite Mode" will initiate once it maxes out. The "Unite Mode" is akin to the "Burst Mode" from the previous game in which damage dealt will be critical and the amount of time reduced for reserve characters to act again. In Mana Khemia 2, the "Intimate Attack" (known previously as "Co-op Attack") can only be executed during "Unite Mode." An "Intimate Attack" is a combo attack achieved by switching in both characters in reserve consecutively, dealing more damage than an ordinary attack (much like "Variable Strike" from Mana Khemia). Also returning from Mana Khemia is the "Finishing Burst," a powerful single character attack which requires the player to fill up a separate gauge only available during "Unite Mode."

Like the previous game, this game has no levels and instead depends entirely on "Grow Books" to increase the characters' stats. A "Grow Book" requires the player to create items through alchemy to unlock slots containing stat boosts acquirable by distributing AP (Ability Points) gained during battle. Mana Khemia 2 adds another layer to the Grow Book by requiring an Ether Level of 100 (the highest) for an item, weapon, armor, or accessory in order to unlock the third slot for that specific creation, thus encouraging the player to plan out the synthesis before using any ingredients in alchemy.

The game is presented as a series of terms at Al-Revis Academy. Each term is made up of several weeks, typically starting and ending with an event and ultimately leading to a key battle at the conclusion. Between main story events, the player is generally required to complete two or three courses, earning grades for how well each course was completed. Once in free time, the player is free to take jobs with Cole (money) as a reward, initiate a "Character Story" (known as "Character Quest" in Mana Khemia) which reveals more about a particular character, or participate in the "Bazaar" which allows the sale of items the player has created and leads to the resale of those items later (bypassing the need to recreate them in the alchemy workshop).

== Story ==
At the start of the game, players are given a choice between two characters: Razeluxe Meitzen (or Raze for short) or Ulrika Mulberry. The events that play out following the choice of characters differs greatly as Raze's route deals with his past while Ulrika's route deals with the origin of Mana. But in either character's playthrough, the core events will still remain the same (taking alchemy classes and school events), though the jobs available may slightly differ.

The game prologue describes Al-Revis Academy (アルレビス学園 Aru-Rebisu Gakuen), a famous alchemy school which used to be floating, separated from the Lower World (where ordinary humans live). But due to the weakening power of Mana which kept the school afloat, Al-Revis Academy plummets down to the Lower World. It soon manages to adapt to the surroundings with the help of students and teachers and resumes its activities in teaching alchemy.

But due to the school's dwindling budget, they have to search for sponsors to keep the school running and Marta Schevesti was given the position of 'Chairman' (理事長 rijichou) of the school due to her being the spokesperson of the sponsors. She proposed to start a new class; 'Combat Class' (戦闘技術 sentou gijitsu) so that more students will enroll in the school to boost the school's finance. But her main goal is to remove alchemy from the school's syllabus stating that "it's a waste of money" (a rough translation).

Al-Revis Academy's principal, Zeppel (of the previous game), was a little too weak-willed to stop her and he seeks Flay (also from the first Mana Khemia) to help and appoints Flay as the classroom teacher for the new class, which Raze and Etward enroll in. Tony (the third recurring character from the previous game) is the homeroom teacher for the alchemy class, with Ulrika, Chloe and Lily under him.

== Soundtrack ==
The soundtrack was composed by Ken Nakagawa and Daisuke Achiwa. It was released May 21, 2008 in Japan by Team Entertainment.

Opening Song

- My Silly Days by Marie

Insert Songs

- 希望告げる風～合唱版～ (Kibou Tsugeru Kaze~Gasshouban~ / The Wind That Reveals Hope~Chorus Version~) by Gust Staff
- Namenloses Licht by Yuto Izumi

Ending Song

- Sail by Mami Yanagi

== Reception ==
Reception

Aggregate score
| Aggregator | Score |
|---|---|
| Metacritic | 70/100 |

Review scores
| Publication | Score |
|---|---|
| Famitsu | 32/40 |
| GameZone | 6.7/10 |
| IGN | 8/10 |
| PlayStation: The Official Magazine | 3/5 |
| RPGamer | 2.5/5 |
| RPGFan | 89/100 |

The game received "mixed or average reviews" according to the review aggregation website Metacritic. In Japan, Famitsu gave it a score of 32 out of 40.
