= Nelke & the Legendary Alchemists: Ateliers of the New World =

2019 video game

- Developer: Gust
- Publisher: Koei Tecmo
- Director: Hiroshi Kataoka
- Producers: Keisuke Kikuchi; Junzo Hosoi
- Designer: Azusa Takahashi
- Artist: Noco
- Writers: Tetsu Shirakawa; Akira Tsuchiya
- Composers: Kazuki Yanagawa; Daisuke Achiwa; Ken Nakagawa; Tatsuya Yano
- Series: Atelier
- Platforms: PlayStation 4 PlayStation Vita; Nintendo Switch; Windows
- Release: Vita: JP: January 31, 2019; PS4, Switch: JP: January 31, 2019; NA: March 26, 2019; EU: March 29, 2019; Windows: NA: March 26, 2019; JP: March 27, 2019; EU: March 29, 2019
- Genres: Role-playing, city-building
- Mode: Single-player

Nelke & the Legendary Alchemists: Ateliers of the New World (Note: Japanese: ネルケと伝説の錬金術士たち ～新たな大地のアトリエ～, Hepburn: Neruke to Densetsu no Renkinjutsushi-tachi ~Aratana Daichi no Atorie~) is a 2019 video game developed by Gust and published by Koei Tecmo for PlayStation 4, Nintendo Switch, Windows, and PlayStation Vita only in Japan. A title within the Atelier series, the gameplay combines a city-building simulation with role-playing elements. The storyline follows Nelke von Lestamm as she attempts to build her own city while seeking a magical tree, employing legendary alchemists from the Atelier franchise to aid her.

Beginning production in 2017 as a series celebration title, the team included multiple veterans including co-producer Junzo Hosoi, artist Noco, scenario designer Akira Tsuchiya, and composers Kazuki Yanagawa, Daisuke Achiwa, and Ken Nakagawa, and Tatsuya Yano. The gameplay was based on the original Atelier trilogy with added social and city building elements. Reception of the game was mixed. Praise was given to the music and gameplay mechanics, but its story, graphics and slow pace saw frequent criticism.

== Gameplay ==
Nelke acts during a battle in Nelke & the Legendary Alchemists

Nelke & the Legendary Alchemists: Ateliers of the New World is a video game that combines a city-building simulation with role-playing elements. The game follows Nelke von Lestamm as she both investigates the location of a magical tree, and builds up the town of Westwald with the help of characters from across the Atelier series. The game is split into two gameplay sections, a five day week dedicated to town maintenance, and a weekend where other activities can be done.

During the working week, Nelke can create new stores and shops to support the town's economy and produce products based on raw materials provided during the weekend period, with money and items being produced as a result. The shop's produce and quality varies depending on who is put in charge, with only alchemists able to work at ateliers. Building up the town encourages new people to move in, which further allows the town to expand. During the game, Nelke must complete assigned tasks sent to test her ability to grow and manage the town, ranging from getting a certain number of citizens to move in to fulfilling certain item or material requirements. If this task is failed or uncompleted, the player reaches a game over.

During the weekend period, Nelke can engage in social events with different characters to raise her relationships status with them, and embark on "Investigations". These actions are limited by a gauge which is depleted with each option, with the weekend ended either manually by the player or by the gauge running out. Investigations have Nelke and a party explore different dungeon environments to gather materials. Material gathering and movement happens automatically, with both materials gathered, chests found and battles triggered being randomised. Battles have a party of five, with only the game's original characters being player-controlled. Actions include basic attacks, special moves activated by gaining points from attacks and other actions, and using items. Investigations end if either the action gauge runs out, or the player party is defeated.

== Synopsis ==
The game follows Nelke von Lestamm, an aristocrat investigating the location of the Granzweit Tree, a plant-like Sage Relic which links to multiple parallel worlds. In exchange for being allowed to continue her research, Nelke's father puts her in charge with managing and growing the town of Westwald, which is said to be near the Granzweit Tree. Soon after arriving, Nelke encounters alchemists from other worlds pulled into her own by the influence of the Granzweit Tree. With help from both the alchemists, and her own servants and allies, Nelke builds up and protects Westwalk into becoming a bustling town. Nelke learns that the Granzweit Tree is imprisoning a monster called Siegel, with its distortion causing the alchemists to appear. Depending on her in-game actions, Nelke either fails to uncover the truth, or destroys Siegel in a final battle which allows the Granzweit Tree to grant its blessing to the land and let the alchemists return home.

== Development ==
Nelke & the Legendary Alchemists was developed by the Kyoto Development Department of Gust. The concept was created by co-producers Keisuke Kikuchi and Junzo Hosoi, who were working out concepts to celebrate the series' anniversary following the release of Atelier Lydie & Suelle in 2017. Among the concepts raised were a party game and a "love simulation" title. The concept they settled on was a city building design that would have Atelier protagonists from across the series with a standalone protagonist. The game was directed by Hiroshi Kataoka, and the design team was led by Azusa Takahashi. In contrast to the growing RPG focus of the main series, Nelke & the Legendary Alchemists was designed to return to the simulation style of the first Atelier games. Based on this gameplay concept, the team created the weekday and weekend structure, with an emphasis on social interaction and automated exploration similar to the Salburg trilogy. Hosoi and series creator Shinichi Yoshiike did not describe the game as a spin-off, with the aim being to create a potential alternative gameplay style for the series as a whole.

The world design was created by Akira Tsuchiya, who had worked on the scenarios of early Atelier titles. The scenario and script were written by Tetsu Shirakawa. It was decided from the outset that the lead Nelke would not be an alchemist, which helped inform the gameplay and world. Despite this change, the theme of a young girl achieving her dreams was kept through Nelke's custodianship of the village. The idea of characters being drawn in from alternate dimensions allowed the team to unify some of the disparate tones and designs, as different Atelier subseries had sometimes starkly different artistic and tonal styles. A common underlying theme was kindness, demonstrated by the alchemists pitching in to help Nelke grow her town. While the game featured cameos from alchemist characters across the series with their own episodic interactions, they were not intended to have starring roles.

The characters were designed by Noco, an artist who had collaborated on the character design of the Mysterious series. When she was offered the role of sole character artist, Noco was initially shocked and thought it was a joke. Nelke was created around the concept of an aristocrat, with her standing out while not being an alchemist. Noco created twelve different drafts of Nelke, designing a thirteenth at Hosoi's insistence. Due to not being an alchemist, Nelke's design had fewer restrictions for Noco, who had fun with the design and added "sparkle" to emphasise her aristocratic background. Nelke's blue hair was chosen so it did not overlap with other Atelier protagonists. The animated opening was created by LandQ Studios, who had worked on other mainline entries.

=== Music ===
The music of Nelke & the Legendary Alchemists was co-composed by Kazuki Yanagawa, Daisuke Achiwa, Ken Nakagawa, and Tatsuya Yano. All were series veterans; Achiwa had composed since the beginning of the series, Yanagawa had first composed for the Arland series, Nakagawa had been a composer since the Gramnad series, and Yano had co-composed for the Mysterious series. Yanagawa described the soundtrack as inspired by and based around Nelke as a character. The soundtrack included a lot of older track arrangements, with the priority being to make them work within the game's world rather than radically changing them.

The opening theme "Alchemia" was composed by Achiwa and performed by Nakae Mitsuki. Achiwa described the song as a "festival-like theme". The title was chosen based on the game's status as a celebratory title, being a direct thematic reference considered unsuitable for the main series. The chorus incorporated words referencing all nineteen Atelier titles up to that point, with Achiwa having trouble incorporating references to the earlier Salburg and Gramnad titles. The ending theme "Birth" was written and composed by Yanagawa, and sung by Haruka Shimotsuki. Yanagawa created the theme without the need to emphasise the series' anniversary, which was being done with the opening theme. Shimotsuki had sung for several earlier Atelier titles, and described the song as initially simple but having a number of cord and key changes. A soundtrack album for the game was released on March 26, 2019

== Release ==
Nelke and the Legendary Alchemists was first announced in June 2018 for PlayStation 4, PlayStation Vita and Nintendo Switch. Originally scheduled for release on December 13 of that year, the game was delayed in Japan to January 31, 2019 to allow more development time. It was supplemented with promotional merchandise. In the West, the game was released for PS4, Switch and Windows through Steam on March 26 in North America, and March 29 in Europe. The Steam version released in Japan on March 27. Koei Tecmo acted as publisher in all regions. Downloadable content was released, covering new music and playable characters, and side stories. Nelke was included as a side character in a 2021 expanded release of Atelier Lydie & Suelle.

== Reception ==
Reception

Aggregate score
Aggregator	Score
Metacritic	PS4: 67/100; NS: 70/100

Review scores
Publication	Score
Famitsu	33/40
Nintendo World Report	7/10
Pocket Gamer	2.5/5 stars
RPGamer	2/5
RPGFan	73%
RPG Site	5/10

During its first week on sale, Nelke & the Legendary Alchemists sold over 31,000 units across its three platforms. The PS4 version reached sixth place in the charts. The game received mixed reviews from critics. Review aggregator website Metacritic gave a score of 70 out of 100 for the Switch version based on 22 reviews, and 67 out of 100 for the PS4 version based on 10 reviews.

Japanese gaming magazine Famitsu noted the inclusion of characters across the series, though one reviewer found the dialogue lacked depth. Daan Koopman of Nintendo World Report enjoyed the story and characters, while RPGamer's Sam Watcher enjoyed the character interactions during social events. Nathan Lee of RPGFan noted the story's focus on character interactions between the alchemists over the overarching narrative, enjoying those and Nelke's personality. Elizabeth Henges described the story as "nothing particularly special" and was unimpressed by the character cameos, while Pocket Gamer's Dave Aubrey simply called it "bland".

Koopman praised the music and graphics, though he noted some poor textures and frame rate issues. Lee enjoyed the animations, but found character model movements stiff, and praised the music and voice acting. Watcher disliked the graphics as cheap-looking and lacking due to minimal animations and low-resolution textures, while he lauded the music for both its original and arranged tracks.

Famitsu praised the gameplay loop, though there were comments that it could be overly varied and feel grindy. Koopman enjoyed the gameplay overall, finding it an interesting alternative to the mainline Atelier series, but disliked the slow opening and investigation sections. Watcher praised the town building mechanics, but disliked the shallow combat and lack of character control, opinions echoed by Lee. Henges noted the enjoyment that was possible in the different systems, but grew bored with the gameplay due to a lack of progression for hours of game time. Aubrey noted an appeal for completionists, but was overall disappointed in its gameplay design, feeling it was an underwhelming low-budgeted title more suited to mobile phones than home consoles.
