= Atelier Lydie & Suelle: The Alchemists and the Mysterious Paintings =

2017 video game

- Nintendo Switch cover
- Developer: Gust
- Publisher: Koei Tecmo
- Producers: Junzō Hosoi; Keisuke Kikuchi; Tadanobu Inoue; Hisashi Koinuma
- Designer: Shinichi Yoshiike
- Artists: Yuugen, NOCO
- Composers: Tatsuya Yano; Daisuke Achiwa; Kazuki Yanagawa
- Series: Atelier
- Platforms: PlayStation 4; PlayStation Vita; Nintendo Switch; Microsoft Windows
- Release: PlayStation Vita: JP: December 21, 2017; Nintendo Switch, PS4: JP: December 21, 2017; NA: March 27, 2018; EU: March 30, 2018; Microsoft Windows: WW: March 27, 2018
- Genre: Role-playing
- Mode: Single-player

Atelier Lydie & Suelle: The Alchemists and the Mysterious Paintings (Note: Japanese: リディー＆スールのアトリエ ～不思議な絵画の錬金術士～, Hepburn: Ridī & Sūru no Atorie ~Fushigi na Kaiga no Renkinjutsushi~) is a role-playing video game developed by Gust, and originally released in Japan for the PlayStation Vita and PlayStation 4 in December 2017. It was released worldwide in March 2018 for the PlayStation 4, Nintendo Switch and Microsoft Windows. It is the nineteenth main entry in the Atelier series celebrating the 20 years of the franchise. It is also the third game of the Mysterious storyline and the last one in chronological order.

The enhanced version of the game titled Atelier Lydie & Suelle: The Alchemists and the Mysterious Paintings DX (Note: Japanese: リディー＆スールのアトリエ ～不思議な絵画の錬金術士～ DX, Hepburn: Ridī & Sūru no Atorie ~Fushigi na Kaiga no Renkinjutsushi~ DX) was released for PlayStation 4, Windows, and the Nintendo Switch on April 22, 2021.

== Gameplay ==
The player controls Lydie and Suelle Marlen as they travel the world, fight monsters, and take on quests to increase their atelier's reputation. The player can receive "quests" from various NPCs around the game's world, and can unlock various secrets and abilities regarding the mysterious paintings they explore. Combat is turn based, and up to six characters can fight at once, divided into three pairs, each pair composed of an attacker and a supporter. The attacker can always act once their turn begins, but supporters can only act according to certain actions performed by the attacker. The attacker and supporter can switch places during the battle and certain pairs have special combination attacks that can be unleashed with powerful results. The player must find and purchase various magical reagents and process them into potions, crystals, and food items for the local townspeople. The game also features puzzle-based mini games that allow you to provide for the townspeople.

== Plot ==
Set eight years after Atelier Sophie and four years after Atelier Firis, the story follows the alchemist twins - the reserved but caring Lydie Marlen, and the eccentric, carefree Suelle Marlen who work alongside their father at the family atelier. But due to his inexperience in alchemy they rarely see any customers. While working to hone their skills, the duo uncovers a mysterious-looking painting, and as they reach out to investigate, the girls are drawn inside a world full of a plethora of rare materials perfect for alchemy. Thus begins the twin's mutual adventure to run a successful atelier, but their inexperience and young age will prove this to be a difficult task. This entry into the series follows Lydie and Suelle go through their lives at the atelier, mixing everyday life with extraordinary experiences and adventures in the "painting world" where they find materials for their alchemy.

== Characters ==
=== Main ===
Lydie Malen (リディー・マーレン, Ridī Māren)
The older of the twin protagonists, Lydie isn't very good at physical exercise, but is good at studying. She's social and kind, carefree and does things at her own pace. However, sometimes she can be a bit of an airhead.

Suelle Malen (スール・マーレン, Sūru Māren)
The younger of the twin protagonists, Suelle, or just "Sue", is as an energetic girl who is more of a tomboy but dislikes bugs.

Firis Mistlud (フィリス・ミストルート, Firisu Misutirudo)
The protagonist of Atelier Firis, she is a certified alchemist who travels the land along her sister Liane, and eventually becomes friends with Lydie and Sue.

Sophie Neuenmuller (ソフィー・ノイエンミュラー, Sofī Noienmyurā)
The protagonist of Atelier Sophie, she is a certified alchemist who travels the land along her close friend Plachta, and also becomes a member of Lydie and Sue's party.

Matthias Ferrié Adalet (マティアス・フェリエ・アダレット, Matiasu Ferie Adaretto)
The crown prince of Adalet and a knight in training, Matthias has a fear of monsters, but does not hesitate when fighting them is needed. He also fancies himself as a womanizer, but usually fails on his advances. He is assigned by his older sister to assist Lydie and Sue as part of his training to become the next king.

Alt (アルト, Aruto)
A mysterious and tactful alchemist who agrees to help Lydie and Sue.

Lucia Borthayre (ルーシャ・ヴォルテール, Rushia Borutieru)
Lydie and Sue's childhood friend and cousin. She acts cocky towards the sisters, while hiding her desire to get closer to them. She is also available as a player character via DLC.

Ilmeria Von Leinweber (イルメリア・フォン・ラインウェバー, Irumeria Bon Rainuebā)
A certified alchemist and a returning character from Atelier Firis who becomes Lydie and Sue's teacher. Like Lucia, she is available as a player character via DLC.

== Release ==
The game released in Japan on December 21, 2017 and March 27, 2018 for Western regions. The game is available both on disc and on digital download. The game features text translations for a variety of languages, but the only language spoken verbally is Japanese.

== Reception ==
=== Review Scores ===
Reception

Aggregate score
Aggregator	Score
Metacritic	NS: 62/100; PS4: 74/100

Review scores
Publication	Score
Computer Games Magazine	7/10
Electronic Gaming Monthly	2/5
Famitsu	35/40
Hardcore Gamer	4/5
Nintendo Life	6/10
Nintendo World Report	6/10
Push Square	6/10
RPGFan	(DX) 81/100

The game received a Famitsu review score of 35/40 across all platforms.

=== Sales ===
In Japan, the PS4 version launched in thirteenth place in the weekly charts with 21,000 copies sold, while the Vita and Switch versions did not appear in the top twenty.
