= Atelier Shallie: Alchemists of the Dusk Sea =

2014 video game

- Developer: Gust Co. Ltd.
- Publishers: JP: Gust Co. Ltd.; WW: Koei Tecmo
- Director: Yoshito Okamura
- Producer: Tadanobu Inoue
- Designer: Azusa Takahashi
- Programmer: Yuji Higuchi
- Composers: Kazuki Yanagawa; Hayato Asano; Daisuke Achiwa
- Series: Atelier
- Platforms: PlayStation 3, PlayStation Vita, PlayStation 4, Nintendo Switch, Microsoft Windows
- Release: July 17, 2014: Atelier Shallie PlayStation 3; JP: July 17, 2014; NA: March 10, 2015; AU: March 12, 2015; EU: March 13, 2015 Atelier Shallie Plus PlayStation Vita; JP: March 3, 2016; NA: January 17, 2017; EU/AU: January 20, 2017 Atelier Shallie DX Nintendo Switch & PlayStation 4; JP: December 25, 2019; WW: January 14, 2020 Microsoft Windows; WW: January 14, 2020
- Genre: Role-playing
- Mode: Single-player

Atelier Shallie: Alchemists of the Dusk Sea (Note: Japanese: シャリーのアトリエ～黄昏の海の錬金術士～, Hepburn: Sharī no Atorie ~ Tasogare no Umi no Renkinjutsu-shi ~) is a 2014 Japanese role-playing video game developed by Gust for the PlayStation 3. It is the 16th main entry in Gust's Atelier series and is currently the final installment of the Dusk trilogy. The game was released in North America and Europe in March 2015.

A version for the PlayStation Vita titled Atelier Shallie Plus: Alchemists of the Dusk Sea was released on March 3, 2016, in Japan, January 17, 2017 in North America and January 20, 2017, in Europe.

A port of the game titled Atelier Shallie: Alchemists of the Dusk Sea DX for Nintendo Switch and PlayStation 4 was released on December 25, 2019, in Japan, and on January 14, 2020, in the West along with an additional Microsoft Windows release worldwide. The DX version was also physically released with English support across Asia as part of the Dusk Trilogy pack in January 2020.

== Gameplay ==
The player is able to choose one of two characters, each with a differing storyline and adventure; regardless of which character is chosen, the flow of the game remains the same. In comparison to previous Atelier games, fields are significantly larger, and the player is able to harvest a wider variety of items and raw materials to use for mixing. Field actions differ depending on the character. Shallotte is able to scrub the floor for items with her broom or clean and catch fish using bait, Shallistera is able to uncover hidden items through dowsing, and both characters are able to mine for items at various locations on the field.

A new goal management system that is known as the "life task system" displays the tasks that need to be performed at specific times, and is tailored to suit different play styles. This system replaces the time limit feature from previous installments of the series. The details of each life task vary upon play style and progression so that they match the player's previous choices, an example being that a player who spends much of the time in battle will be given battle-related tasks. The field changes dynamically during exploration depending on the player's actions; monsters and items on the map change after fulfilling life tasks. Failure to accomplish enough life tasks has a toll on the player's performance during exploration and item gathering.

Just like the previous game, the battle system involves parties consisting of up to six characters, where consecutive attacks fill a Burst gauge which triggers a Burst state when filled, allowing the player to build up effect boosts from the chain, and utilize special skills.

The player is able to experience events with the characters as the game proceeds. These events are separate from the main storyline and allows the player to view new sides of the characters.

The player is able to combine items into different items. To create an item, the player must first obtain the blueprints and items to use as ingredients for the new item. The player can then choose what item to create through a list that is displayed by accessing a cauldron in an atelier. The player will then be able to choose ingredients and decide in what order they will be added, and the player will after a certain point in the game be able to use skills to fine-tune items in this step. At a high enough level, the access to using "Chain" will be given. By using skills of the same element, a "Chain" will build up. The Chain value affects the effect of skills. Additional effects can be picked in the last step of the creation of the item. Weapons and armor are made in the same way, but has to be crafted by character Miruca at her atelier, as the player characters Shallistera and Shallotte are unable to create such items. Miruca will also learn skills and share the level used to create items with the protagonists, but there are differences between Miruca's, Shallotte's, and Shallistera's skills. Items that can be used to create other items can be obtained from the fields, but items may disappear from a location if they are harvested too frequently.

== Plot ==
The game's story takes place about 10 years after the beginning of Atelier Ayesha: The Alchemist of Dusk and 6 years after the beginning of Atelier Escha & Logy: Alchemists of the Dusk Sky. As water sources dry up from an oasis town, the plants wilt and animals go hungry. It is here where two alchemists with different methods of making a living meet. Whilst Shallistera Argo to find a way to save her village from demise, Shallotte Elminus goes on her daily life in an attempt to become a proper alchemist. After meeting each other, Shallistera and Shallotte will fulfill goals by working together.

== Development ==
During the development phase, the game was referred to by the code name "Project A16", which was announced as a new game project by Gust on March 16, 2014. The game was initially announced for release on June 28, 2014, but was delayed to July 17 in the same year in order to improve the game's quality.

== Reception ==
Reception

Aggregate score
Aggregator	Score
Metacritic	PS3: 76/100; VITA: 78/100; NS: 74/100

Review scores
Publication	Score
Computer Games Magazine	(Plus) 7.5/10
Destructoid	(Plus) 8.5/10
Hardcore Gamer	(Plus) 4/5
Nintendo Life	(DX) 7/10
Nintendo World Report	(DX) 7.5/10
Pocket Gamer	(Plus) 3.5/5
Push Square	(Plus) 8/10
RPGamer	(Plus) 3.5/5
RPGFan	91/100
VentureBeat	84/100

Famitsu gave the game a review score of 33/40. The game sold 43,744 physical retail copies within the first week of release in Japan. Within a November 2014 earnings report, Koei Tecmo announced that 80,000 copies were shipped within the Japanese and Asian regions.

The game has a Metacritic rating of 76/100. Push Square's review of the game compliments how the game simplifies some of the more complex mechanics from previous games while still remaining to be challenging enough for the player to enjoy, giving an overall rating of 7/10.
