= Atelier Marie: The Alchemist of Salburg =

1997 video game

Atelier Marie: Alchemist of Salburg
- Cover of the PlayStation version
- Developer: Gust
- Publishers: Gust (1997–2005); Koei Tecmo (2018–present)
- Director: Toshiharu Yamanishi
- Producer: Tadanobu Inoue
- Designer: Shinichi Yoshiike
- Programmers: Yuji Higuchi; Kenichi Takanashi; Yoichi Nakayama
- Artist: Kohime Ohse
- Composers: Daisuke Achiwa; Toshiharu Yamanishi
- Series: Atelier
- Platforms: PlayStation: Sega Saturn; Windows; Dreamcast; PlayStation 2; Android; iOS; PlayStation 4; PlayStation 5; Nintendo Switch
- Release: May 23, 1997: Original PlayStation; JP: May 23, 1997 Sega Saturn; JP: December 11, 1997 Windows; JP: April 28, 2000 Dreamcast; JP: November 15, 2001 PlayStation 2; JP: April 27, 2005 Android, iOS; JP: February 28, 2018 Remake PS4, PS5, Switch, Windows; WW: July 13, 2023
- Genre: Role-playing
- Mode: Single-player

Atelier Marie: The Alchemist of Salburg (Note: Japanese: マリーのアトリエ ～ザールブルグの錬金術士～, Hepburn: Marī no Atorie ~Zāruburugu no Renkinjutsushi~) is a 1997 role-playing video game developed and published by Gust. The first entry in the Atelier series, it was originally released for the PlayStation, then received ports and enhanced versions on other platforms. A remake for modern platforms, Atelier Marie Remake, was released worldwide in 2023 by Koei Tecmo. Following the efforts of alchemist-in-training Marie to pass an exam within five years, the gameplay focuses on exploring for materials to create alchemical recipes, and completing story missions and requests within the in-game time limit.

Atelier Marie began development in 1996, with creator and designer Shinichi Yoshiike wanting a light-hearted fantasy. Artist Kohime Ohse created the character designs and in-game art. Reception of the game has been generally positive, with commentary focusing on its non-standard gameplay compared to other titles of its time. The remake saw praise for its art, but several noted its archaic elements. Following the success of Atelier Marie, Gust developed several follow-up games including two sequels. The Atelier series would become one of Gust's flagship products.

== Gameplay ==
While maintaining similar gameplay concepts, there are some mechanical differences between the original Atelier Marie (top) and its remake (bottom).

Atelier Marie: The Alchemist of Salburg is a role-playing video game in which the player takes on the role of alchemist-in-training Marie, running an alchemy workshop over five in-game years. The world and environments are presented through 2D sprite environments and artwork. As Marie, the player works from their atelier workshop in the city of Salburg, where Marie combines ingredients to create items through alchemy. The resultant item is determined by what ingredients are used. Each synthesis increases Marie's fatigue metre, which increases the likelihood of a failure producing no item. Successful syntheses are recorded in a journal. Players typically cannot create using more than two attributes, with the one in-game exception being the Philosopher's Stone item. Using ingredients with opposing attributes requires a neutralizing agent. The game has a time limit, with major actions such as exploring beyond Salburg or synthesising in the atelier taking up a day of in-game time. Depending on the player's progress and actions, multiple endings can be unlocked.

In Salburg, Marie can purchase and sell supplies, talk to non-playable characters (NPCs) to receive quests or unlock new areas beyond Salburg, and hire adventurers to accompany her outside on expeditions. Outside the town, exploration is done by travelling to a location on the world map revealed through talking with NPCs, with exploration portrayed through static artwork and a menu where the current party can be checked, and exploration can be continued. Each day spent exploring yields randomised ingredients harvested or a random encounter with an enemy. Battles are turn-based, with the three party members including Marie positioned on a grid which determines their abilities. The party can attack, use magic skills, and equipped items. Winning a battle rewards resources and experience points which raise character levels. Minigames also trigger when gathering certain materials or creating important items.

The remake, while preserving the original's basic structure and time limit, features multiple gameplay changes. The world is presented from an angled 3D perspective with visual novel-style cutscenes. The player guides Marie around the environments of Salburg and dungeon environments, with enemies represented by sprites on the map the player can engage by running into. There are additional quests, including instructional lessons from Marie's teacher. The remake also includes an "indefinite mode" which turns off the time limit, allowing the player to take their time while altering the story progression.

== Synopsis ==
Marlone, known by her nickname Marie, is attending the prestigious Royal Academy of Magic in the city of Salburg. Despite her eagerness and genuine passion for alchemy, Marie is the worst student enrolled, continually failing her exams due to her clumsiness while synthesizing. Her instructor Ingrid allows Marie one final chance to graduate, gives her a workshop of her own in Salburg. The condition is that Marie must successfully synthesize a high-quality item within five years, or she will be held back from graduation. Over the five years, Marlone operates from her workshop, fulfilling requests for the people of Salburg. She also interacts with Schia Donnerstag, a close friend who is suffering from a prolonged illness. There are multiple endings; a bad ending where Marlone fails, and multiple endings where she passes Ingrid's test with varying levels of success, with further variations depending on her relationship with Schia.

== Development ==
The plan for Atelier Marie was created by Shinichi Yoshiike. He was looking for a job in the game industry at the time, and was so eager to create a game that he was drafting the design document before he was hired by Gust. He was inspired by a class he took in university which covered historical alchemy. Beginning production in February 1996, the early plan was for a tactical role-playing game. Due to the growing number of RPGs on the PlayStation, the concept of alchemy and synthesis was added to distinguish it from other titles at the time. While the game used a fantasy setting, Yoshiike kept the alchemy grounded by having mundane items being created. As he did not plan on doing a sequel, Yoshiike put everything he wanted to into Atelier Marie.

The narrative tone was inspired by Yoshiike's liking for children's fantasy and classic novels including Anne of Green Gables. To contrast against other Japanese titles which had a chosen one figure as the lead character, a second-rate student was chosen as the lead protagonist, giving players a relatable goal. The lead was made a teenage girl to appeal to the female gaming and manga market, which had grown visibly with the popularity of shōjo manga. At Yoshiike's insistence, no romance elements were included. Marie and Schia's friendship was directly based on that between Anne and Diana from Anne of Green Gables. The multiple endings were included by Yoshiike as an incentive for players to complete the game as fast as possible with high completion.

The character designs and artwork were created by Kohime Ohse. Ohse was involved from an early stage, with Yoshiike wanting to create a game with her art from the outset. In response to Yoshiike's wish for a light-hearted "fluffy" game, Ohse's work on Atelier Marie used a light-hearted and "pastoral" look. The setting of Salburg was based on Medieval Germany, with Ohse travelling to the region to study a castle which she replicated in a piece of cutscene art. Marlowe's design was inspired by European witches, with her final design being a version that showed her both as a classy figure and a drop-out. Once the art was completed, there were no redrafts, with the team getting a clearer vision for the gameplay and tone when they saw Ohse's art. The music was co-composed by Daisuke Achiwa and Toshiharu Yamanishi.

== Release ==
Atelier Marie was originally published by Gust for PlayStation on May 23, 1997. An expanded version for Sega Saturn, titled Atelier Marie Ver. 1.3, was published by Imagineer's publishing label Imadio on December 11. An expanded PlayStation version, Atelier Marie Plus, was published on June 4, 1998. Imagineer ported the game to Windows and released it on April 28, 2000. This version had network sharing capabilities until December of that year. A remake for the Dreamcast was developed and published by Kool Kidz on November 15, 2001. The version bundled Atelier Marie with a remake of its sequel Atelier Ellie. The Dreamcast version released with a computer virus which would infect computers when the disc was used to access desktop features included on the disc. In response, Kool Kidz recalled the game and issued an apology to buyers. The remake bundle was released by Gust for PlayStation 2 on October 27, 2005. The PS2 port received a fan translation in 2018. The Plus version was released for iOS and Android on February 28, 2018, by then-series owners Koei Tecmo. Until 2023, no version of Atelier Marie was released outside Japan.

=== Atelier Marie Remake ===
A high-definition remake, titled Atelier Marie Remake: The Alchemist of Salburg, was announced in February 2023 for PlayStation 4, PlayStation 5, Nintendo Switch, and Windows via Steam. The remake was based on the expanded Plus version with further gameplay additions alongside redone graphics. The remake was released worldwide by Koei Tecmo on July 13, 2023. A digital deluxe edition came with additional items and a translated port of the PS2 remake of Atelier Marie.

Following the increased popularity of the Atelier series with the success of the Atelier Ryza trilogy, series producer Junzo Hosoi wanted to make the first game accessible to new players to celebrate the series' 25th anniversary. Production began in early 2022 as development was finishing on Atelier Sophie 2. The game was made easier by adjusting gathering and battle statistics, and introduced new social events triggered during the five year time limit. An "Unlimited Mode" was added as an accommodation to newer players, who were used to the more lax time mechanics of later Atelier titles. The in-game character models were designed in a deformed miniature style, emulating the original in-game sprites. The character designs were redrawn by artist Benitama, and the music was arranged for the remake by Kumi Tanioka.

== Reception ==
Reception

Aggregate score
Aggregator	Score
Metacritic	75/100 (PC); 75/100 (PS5); 77/100 (Switch)

Review scores
Publication	Score
Famitsu	30/40
Hardcore Gamer	4/5
Nintendo Life	8/10
Nintendo World Report	7/10
RPGamer	3/5
RPGFan	80%
TouchArcade	4/5
Dengeki PlayStation	75/100, 85/100, 80/100, 90/100; 80/100, 85/100 (Plus)
RPG Site	7/10
Weekly TV Gamer	7/10, 5/10, 7/10(SS)

While Atelier Marie was not extensively promoted by Gust, the game was a commercial success. By the end of 1997, it had sold over 212,000 units in Japan. It was particularly popular among young women, and the series went on to become one of Gust's main properties. Both the PlayStation and Saturn versions earned scores of 30 points out of 40 from Japanese gaming magazine Famitsu. In a later review of the Plus version, Famitsu noted the high degree of player freedom and the fun in collecting and creating items.

In a retrospective review, Michael Baker of RPGamer praised its innovation at the time of release, but found its gameplay "average" and graphics underwhelming compared to other titles of its time. In an article on a later entry in the series, Eric L. Patterson of Play Magazine said the original game looked interesting, feeling that its unusual style and presentation kept it exclusive to Japan.

The remake made a strong sales debut in Japan, recording sales of over 21,000 units across its PS5 and Switch versions and becoming the highest-selling new release for its launch week. The game saw generally positive reviews from critics. Famitsu praised the updates to its playability, but noted some archaic elements in its design and character writing that showed the game's original age. Paige Chamberlain of RPG Site felt the game was priced too high for its length and content, but enjoyed the game as a good modern version of the original game. Nintendo World Report's Allyson Cygan disliked the redesigned minigames and felt the time limit would frustrate new players, but otherwise gave praise to the remake both for its revamped presentation and core gameplay.

Mitch Vogel of Nintendo Life praised the graphical and audio presentation of the remake, praising its charm and calling it a "must-buy" for series fans. His main criticisms were its short length and simplistic alchemy system. RPGFan's Des Miller noted the potential issues players might have with its older mechanics, and felt the combat and gathering systems were weak points, but otherwise praised the remake's updates. Hardcore Gamer's Jeremy Peeples praised the remake for its revamped mechanics and presentation, calling it "a fantastic gateway game for anyone new to the Atelier games". Shaun Musgrave of Touch Arcade called the game an enjoyable entry for series fans as it made the original game more accessible, but did not recommend it to first time players due to its older mechanics.

== Legacy ==
=== Sequels ===
Following the success of Atelier Marie, further titles were released within the Salburg continuity. The first, a direct sequel Atelier Elie: The Alchemist of Salburg 2 (Note: Japanese: エリーのアトリエ ～ザールブルグの錬金術士2～, Hepburn: Erī no Atorie ~Zāruburugu no Renkinjutsushi 2~) was released on December 17, 1998, for the PlayStation. Ellie follows trainee alchemist, who was cured of a disease by an experienced Marie, as she enters the same academy. Atelier Ellie was made quickly based on the success of the original, with Yoshiike focusing on refining the original mechanics rather than adding anything new. The game featured anime cutscenes created by Studio D-Volt. Isaemon Yamagata took over as character designer and illustrator, while Yamanishi and Achiwa returned as composers. Atelier Ellie earned a score of 33 points out of 40 from Famitsu, and across 1998 and 1999 sold over 161,000 units.

The third title, Atelier Lilie: The Alchemist of Salburg 3 (Note: Japanese: リリーのアトリエ ～ザールブルグの錬金術士3～, Hepburn: Rirī no Atorie ~Zāruburugu no Renkinjutsushi 3~) was released on June 21, 2001, for the PlayStation 2. The game is a prequel to the previous titles, following Lilie as she introduces alchemy to the kingdom of Salburg. After Ellie, Yoshiike felt he had exhausted the series, but was encouraged to carry on by fan requests, using the new platform to experiment with new and expanded systems. Digimation created the game's animated cutscenes. Yamagata returned as character designer, while Yamanishi composed the music with Akira Tsuchiya. As with Ellie, Lilie was given a score of 33/40 from Famitsu, and sold over 90,000 units during its release year.

=== Spin-offs ===
Several spin-off using the Salburg setting were released during the 2000s. An adventure game sequel to Atelier Lilie, Hermina and Culus: Atelier Lilie Another Story, was released for PlayStation 2 on December 20, 2001. Two titles were published by Imagineer in January 2000, Atelier Marie GB and Atelier Ellie GB for the Game Boy. Yamagata returned to create character designs. A spin-off for the WonderSwan, Marie & Ellie: Two People's Atelier, was released on October 25, 2001. Developed by E3 Staff, the game follows Marie and Ellie collaborating on setting up an alchemy workshop. A follow-up to the WonderSwan title co-developed by Gust and Banpresto, Marie, Ellie & Annis, was released for the Game Boy Advance on January 24, 2003.

Characters from the Salburg series were later featured in the 2019 spin-off title Nelke & the Legendary Alchemists: Ateliers of the New World. Marie would be featured alongside other Gust series characters in the 2008 RPG Cross Edge, developed by Idea Factory.
