= Atelier Judie: The Alchemist of Gramnad and Atelier Viorate: The Alchemist of Gramnad 2 =

2002 and 2003 video games

Atelier Judie: The Alchemist of Gramnad Atelier Viorate: The Alchemist of Gramnad 2
- Cover art for Atelier Viorate
- Developer: Gust
- Publisher: Gust
- Director: Shinichi Yoshiike
- Producer: Tadanobu Inoue
- Designer: Shinichi Yoshiike
- Artist: Jun Futaba
- Composers: Akira Tsuchiya; Miyoko Kobayashi; Masayuki Kobayashi; Ken Nakagawa; Daisuke Achiwa
- Series: Atelier
- Platforms: PlayStation 2 PlayStation Portable
- Release: Atelier Judie: JP: June 27, 2002 (PS2); JP: April 8, 2010 (PSP); Atelier Viorate: JP: June 26, 2003 (PS2); JP: February 3, 2011 (PSP)
- Genre: Role-playing
- Mode: Single-player

Atelier Judie: The Alchemist of Gramnad (Note: Japanese: ユーディーのアトリエ ～グラムナートの錬金術士～, Hepburn: Yūdī no Atorie ~Guramunāto no Renkinjutsushi~) and Atelier Viorate: The Alchemist of Gramnad 2 (Note: Japanese: ヴィオラートのアトリエ ～グラムナートの錬金術士2～, Hepburn: Viorāto no Atorie ~Guramunāto no Renkinjutsushi 2~) (Note: The protagonist of The Alchemist of Gramnad 2 has alternately been translated as "Viorate" and "Violet". As of 2019, the name has been officially localized as "Viorate".) are a duology of role-playing video games developed and published by Gust for the PlayStation 2. Forming the fourth and fifth entries in the Atelier series, they were respectively published in 2002 and 2003. Expanded versions of the games were released for PlayStation Portable in 2010 and 2011. Both titles follow a young female alchemist from the kingdom of Gramnad; Atelier Judie focuses on the character Judith after an accident transports her through time, and Atelier Viorate follows the young Viorate running an alchemy workshop in a dwindling town. The gameplay has the characters exploring for items to perform alchemy, fighting enemies in turn-based combat.

Series creator Shinichi Yoshiike returned as director and co-designer, while new artist Jun Futaba designed the characters. Following the Salburg series, Yoshiike renewed the setting and characters, and simplified the synthesizing mechanics. Both games feature anime cutscenes created by Point Pictures. Selling over 100,000 units combined in Japan, the two games earned positive reviews from Japanese gaming magazine Famitsu. When mentioned, Western journalists gave praise to their mechanics and music. Following the Gramnad titles, the Atelier series shifted to its RPG elements over gathering and alchemy, beginning with Atelier Iris: Eternal Mana (2004).

== Gameplay ==
A battle in Atelier Judie.

Atelier Judie: The Alchemist of Gramnad and Atelier Viorate: The Alchemist of Gramnad 2 are role-playing video games in which players take on the role of a young female alchemist. In Atelier Judie, the player controls lead character Judith "Judie" Volltone as she goes between her shop in town, and various other town and dungeon environments in the surrounding area to complete quests and gather ingredients for alchemy. While time passes and impacts some elements of the world, the series' recurring time management system is not present in Atelier Judie. In Atelier Viorate, players take on the role of Viorate Platane as she manages a shop in her home town. The gameplay of Atelier Viorate focuses on balancing exploring beyond the town with managing her shop, with the reintroduction of a time limit and mechanics tied to interacting with the locals and responding to product demands.

Environments are separated into interconnected zones, with town environments housing quest givers and shops for buying and selling, and characters the player can talk with to gain new quests or advance different elements of the story. Items and ingredients are collected during dungeon exploration. Combat in both games is turn-based, with the lead character and her current party able to perform normal attacks, and other actions tied to items. Both games feature item crafting through alchemy as a core mechanic. Based on the ingredients, which can age or degrade depending on how long they are kept in the inventory, the final result of alchemy will change.

== Synopsis ==
Atelier Judie and Atelier Viorate are set in the land of Gramnad, a land within the same world as Salburg, setting for the Alchemist of Salburg games. In Atelier Judie, young alchemist Judith "Judie" Volltone is synthesising the Hourglass of the Dragon, an artefact which can travel through time. Due to a hair falling into the cauldron, the synthesis goes wrong and the resulting explosion sends Judith and her pet parrot Fink two centuries into the future. She is taken in by the merchant Vitos, who initially appears kind but ends up shouldering her with a large debt; and befriends Rastel, a young woman with a love of fairy stories. Judie works to pay off her debt and synthesise another Dragon's Hourglass, forcing her to fight powerful monsters in the process. Depending on completed actions and a final choice, Judie either returns to her own time using the artefact, or stays in the future with her new companions.

In Atelier Viorate, the young Viorate Platane refuses to leave her village of Karotte when her parents moved to another town; the move was prompted by Karotte slowly losing its population and dwindling. Viorate, who was tutored in alchemy by Eisel Weimar of Salburg, sets up an alchemy workshop with her older brother Bartholamus. Her parents give her three years to make a success of it, otherwise she must join them. Depending on her success at running the workshop and attracting visitors to Karotte, and her relationships with different characters in the village, the game branches into several different endings. In the true ending, Viorate departs on a journey with Eisel, leaving Bartholamus to run the now-successful shop.

== Development ==
Production on the Alchemist of Gramnad titles began at series developer and publisher Gust following the release of Atelier Lilie (2001). Both games were produced for the PlayStation 2. Series creator Shinichi Yoshiike returned as director. Having felt he had explored the Salburg setting as much as he could, he decided to shift the series to a new setting and characters. The synthesizing mechanics, which had become progressively more complex over the Salburg titles, were simplified. Based on feedback from Atelier Judie, the gameplay of Atelier Viorate was adjusted. Specifically talking about Atelier Viorate, the team wanted to explore a theme of meeting and interacting with characters with their own lives and dreams. Eisel was a returning character from Atelier Ellie, with Yoshiike describing her appearance as being a "touch point" for series fans. Atelier Judie also introduced Pamela, a helpful ghost who became a recurring character in later Atelier titles.

The characters for both games were designed by Jun Futaba. The change in illustrator was part of Yoshiike's wish to renew the series. A relative newcomer to illustration, Futaba was a series fan and keen to maintain the series' visual identity without sacrificing his own style. Both games featured anime cutscenes animated by Point Pictures. The music for Atelier Judie was co-composed by Akira Tsuchiya, Miyoko Kobayashi, and Masayuki Kobayashi. The music was described as being in the style of earlier Atelier titles. Several vocal themes were created, including an opening theme and multiple in-game tracks performed by Miki Takahashi. The two ending themes were performed by Saeko Chiba. For Atelier Viorate, Tsuchiya returned alongside Daisuke Achiwa and newcomer Ken Nakagawa. For this soundtrack, the team incorporated Irish and Scandinavian-style musical elements to distinguish it from other entries. The opening theme was sung by Shue Nagakura. Achiwa had worked on the series since its beginning, while Tsuchiya began with Atelier Ellie.

== Releases ==
Atelier Judie was announced in 2002, releasing on June 27 that year. The game inspired different pieces of merchandise, including a game guide published by Enterbrain, and a trilogy of audio dramas following Judie and her companions. Atelier Viorate was announced under the provisional title Atelier 5 in January 2003, releasing on June 26 of that year. As part of the promotion, a prequel novella was released through Gust's website. Soundtrack albums for both games were released. Following the Gramnad duology, the series shifted its focus away from the alchemy simulation to traditional RPG elements, beginning with Atelier Iris: Eternal Mana (2004).

Both games were given expanded versions for the PlayStation Portable in the 2010s. Production on the ports began with Atelier Judie in 2009, with the platform choice being made due to similar hardware limitations. Both versions saw expansions to their gameplay and narrative, along with new characters which linked the games together. The ports were respectively released on April 8, 2010 for Atelier Judie, and February 3, 2011 for Atelier Viorate. These releases also saw soundtrack albums, featuring music created for the new versions. As with most of the early Atelier titles, the Gramnad games have not been released outside Japan.

== Reception ==
Atelier Judie

Review scores
| Publication | Score |
|---|---|
| Famitsu | 8/10, 9/10, 7/10, 7/10 (PS2); 6/10, 8/10, 7/10, 7/10 (PSP) |
| RPGamer | 2.5/5 |

Atelier Viorate

Review score
| Publication | Score |
|---|---|
| Famitsu | 32/40 (PS2); 6/10, 8/10, 7/10, 7/10 (PSP) |

During 2002, Atelier Judie sold nearly 67,000 units, ranking among the top 200 best-selling titles in Japan during the year. Japanese gaming magazine Famitsu praised the original Atelier Judie, focusing on its approachable nature for series newcomers. The PSP version was seen as enjoyable, but dated due to a lack of new features or graphical updates. In a 2015 import review, Michael Baker of RPGamer described the game as an improvement over Atelier Lilie, but still lacking later titles' polish and featuring controversial mechanical changes.

After three months on sale, Atelier Viorate was the seventh best-selling PS2 title in Japan. By the end of 2003, the game similarly entered the top 200 best-selling titles, selling over 58,500 units. Famitsu positively noted the focus on smaller tasks, but that there was a lack of innovation in its gameplay and style. The magazine's review of the PSP version was more positive, with the reviewers enjoying its approach to questing and alchemy. Reviewing the game's music album, Mike Wilson of RPGFan lauded its overall score as superior to the later Atelier Iris.

In a 2018 feature for RPGFan on Japan-exclusive games, RPGFan's Mike Salbato highlighted both the Gramnad titles for their growing RPG elements and having aged better than the three earlier Salburg titles. In a 2020 feature on the Atelier series, Anna Marie Privitere of RPGamer highlighted Atelier Judie for its introduction of new elements to the series and lack of a time limit; and summed up Atelier Viorate as "a fairly open game without much of a goal or direction" beyond Viorate's smaller tasks and character interactions.
