= Gust (company) =

Japanese video game company

- Japanese logo
- Native name: ガスト
- Formerly: Gust Co. Ltd. (1993–2011); Gust Nagano (2011 - 2016); Gust (2016 - present)
- Type: Division
- Industry: Video games
- Founded: 1 October 1993; 32 years ago
- Headquarters: Minatomirai, Yokohama, Japan
- Key people: Junzo Hosoi (Executive officer)
- Products: Atelier series Ar tonelico series
- Parent: Koei Tecmo (2011–present)
- Website: http://www.gust.co.jp/

Gust (Japanese: ガスト, Hepburn: Gasuto) is a video game developer and division of Koei Tecmo Games, known for its Atelier franchise.

== Company ==
Gust Co. Ltd. (株式会社ガスト, Kabushiki-gaisha Gasuto) was founded in 1993 in Nagano, Japan, as the first game software house in Nagano Prefecture. The company began by creating dōjinshi games for personal computers. Its first project was Story of King Aress (アレス王の物語) for the PC-9801 personal computer. In 1994 the company became an official developer for the Sony PlayStation video game console, and its first PlayStation product was the simulation game Falcata (ファルカタ). In 1997, Gust released Atelier Marie, the first game in the long-running, popular, and iconic Atelier series. Since then the company has released several successful games for various home and portable video game systems.

On December 7, 2011 Japanese publisher Koei Tecmo acquired the company from its previous owner Keiken Holdings for 2.2 billion yen as a wholly owned subsidiary. It was announced on July 28, 2014 that Gust will be absorbed by its parent company Koei Tecmo on October 1, 2014, and will continue to develop existing game series and new intellectual properties as "Gust Nagano Development Group".

In 2015, Gust released a new site called "Gust Social" exclusively for its social games, starting with Nights of Azure, Atelier Sophie and Ciel Nosurge as the first advertised, for the purpose of improving communication with fan feedback. The website allows for fans to make a Gust ID account which allows them to participate in surveys, buy products from the Gust online store, and a variety of other related content. Additionally, the Gust Social serves as an active news site for its new social games.

In 2016, during restructuring of Koei Tecmo, Gust Nagano fused with Koei Tecmo Kyoto to form Gust, a fully incorporated division of Koei Tecmo. In March 2020, Gust transferred its main studio from its building in Nagano to the newly completed Koei Tecmo headquarters in Minato Mirai 21.

== Games ==
Games developed by Gust are known for their alchemy and item-crafting systems, distinctive character designs, and traditional or "old-school" graphical and storytelling style. In Japan, Gust has published its own games or cooperated with Banpresto. In North America, these games are published by NIS America. After the acquisition by Koei Tecmo, all games are published by them.

Title	System	Release date	JP	NA	EU	AUS
Aress-ō no Monogatari (アレス王の物語)	PC-9801	March 18, 1994	Yes	No	No	No
Falcata: Astran Pardma no Monshou (ファルカタ ～アストラン・パードマの紋章～)	PlayStation	June 23, 1995	Yes	No	No	No
Welcome House (ウエルカムハウス)	PlayStation	February 23, 1996	Yes	No	No	No
Meru Purana (メールプラーナ)	PlayStation	June 21, 1996	Yes	No	No	No
Welcome House 2 (ウエルカムハウス2)	PlayStation	December 20, 1996	Yes	No	No	No
Atelier Marie: The Alchemist of Salburg	PlayStation	May 23, 1997	Yes	No	No	No
Karyuujou (火竜娘)	PlayStation	September 25, 1997	Yes	No	No	No
Atelier Marie: The Alchemist of Salburg Ver. 1.3	Sega Saturn	December 11, 1997	Yes	No	No	No
Atelier Marie Plus: The Alchemist of Salburg	PlayStation	June 4, 1998	Yes	No	No	No
Atelier Elie: The Alchemist of Salburg 2	PlayStation	December 17, 1998	Yes	No	No	No
Noir Yeux Noire: Cielgris Fantasm (黒い瞳のノア Cielgris Fantasm)	PlayStation	July 1, 1999	Yes	No	No	No
Robin Lloyd's Adventure (ロビン・ロイドの冒険)	PlayStation	January 6, 2000	Yes	No	No	No
Atelier Marie: The Alchemist of Salburg	Microsoft Windows	April 28, 2000	Yes	No	No	No
Atelier Elie: The Alchemist of Salburg 2	Microsoft Windows	April 28, 2000	Yes	No	No	No
Hresvelgr (フレースヴェルグ)	PlayStation 2	June 22, 2000	Yes	No	No	No
Hresvelgr: International Edition (フレースヴェルグ International Edition) (Note: Released in Europe as Jet Ion GP.)	PlayStation 2	December 21, 2000	Yes	No	Yes	No
Atelier Lilie: The Alchemist of Salburg 3	PlayStation 2	June 21, 2001	Yes	No	No	No
Atelier Marie & Elie: The Alchemists of Salburg 1-2	Dreamcast	November 15, 2001	Yes	No	No	No
Hermina & Culus: Atelier Lilie Another Story	PlayStation 2	December 20, 2001	Yes	No	No	No
Atelier Lilie Plus: The Alchemist of Salburg 3	PlayStation 2	April 4, 2002	Yes	No	No	No
Atelier Judie: The Alchemist of Gramnad	PlayStation 2	June 27, 2002	Yes	No	No	No
Taishou Mononoke Ibunroku (大正もののけ異聞録)	PlayStation 2	February 27, 2003	Yes	No	No	No
Atelier Viorate: The Alchemist of Gramnad 2	PlayStation 2	June 26, 2003	Yes	No	No	No
Atelier Iris: Eternal Mana	PlayStation 2	May 27, 2004	Yes	Yes	Yes	Yes
Atelier Iris 2: The Azoth of Destiny	PlayStation 2	May 26, 2005	Yes	Yes	Yes	Yes
Atelier Marie+Elie: The Alchemists of Salburg 1-2	PlayStation 2	October 27, 2005	Yes	No	No	No
Ar Tonelico: Melody of Elemia	PlayStation 2	January 26, 2006	Yes	Yes	Yes	No
Atelier Iris 3: Grand Phantasm	PlayStation 2	June 29, 2006	Yes	Yes	Yes	Yes
Mana Khemia: Alchemists of Al-Revis	PlayStation 2	June 21, 2007	Yes	Yes	Yes	No
Ar Tonelico II: Melody of Metafalica	PlayStation 2	October 25, 2007	Yes	Yes	Yes	No
Mana Khemia 2: Fall of Alchemy	PlayStation 2	May 29, 2008	Yes	Yes	No	No
Mana Khemia: Student Alliance	PlayStation Portable	September 25, 2008	Yes	Yes	Yes	No
Atelier Rorona: The Alchemist of Arland	PlayStation 3	June 25, 2009	Yes	Yes	Yes	Yes
Mana Khemia 2: Fall of Alchemy Portable Plus	PlayStation Portable	October 1, 2009	Yes	No	No	No
Ar Tonelico Qoga: Knell of Ar Ciel	PlayStation 3	January 28, 2010	Yes	Yes	Yes	No
Atelier Judie: The Alchemist of Gramnad: Imprisoned Garden	PlayStation Portable	April 8, 2010	Yes	No	No	No
Atelier Totori: The Adventurer of Arland	PlayStation 3	June 24, 2010	Yes	Yes	Yes	Yes
Atelier Viorate: The Alchemist of Gramnad 2: The Memories of Ultramarine	PlayStation Portable	February 3, 2011	Yes	No	No	No
Atelier Meruru: The Apprentice of Arland	PlayStation 3	June 23, 2011	Yes	Yes	Yes	Yes
Ciel Nosurge: Ushinawareta Hoshi e Sasagu Uta	PlayStation Vita	April 26, 2012	Yes	No	No	No
Atelier Ayesha: The Alchemist of Dusk	PlayStation 3	June 28, 2012	Yes	Yes	Yes	Yes
Atelier Totori Plus: The Adventurer of Arland	PlayStation Vita	November 29, 2012	Yes	Yes	Yes	Yes
Ciel Nosurge: Ushinawareta Hoshi e Sasagu Uta RE:Incarnation	PlayStation Vita	February 21, 2013	Yes	No	No	No
Atelier Meruru Plus: The Apprentice of Arland	PlayStation Vita	March 20, 2013	Yes	Yes	Yes	Yes
Atelier Escha & Logy: Alchemists of the Dusk Sky	PlayStation 3	June 27, 2013	Yes	Yes	Yes	Yes
Atelier Rorona Plus: The Alchemist of Arland	PlayStation 3, PlayStation Vita	November 21, 2013	Yes	Yes	Yes	Yes
Ar Nosurge: Ode to an Unborn Star	PlayStation 3	March 6, 2014	Yes	Yes	Yes	No
Atelier Ayesha Plus: The Alchemist of Dusk	PlayStation Vita	March 27, 2014	Yes	Yes	Yes	Yes
Atelier Shallie: Alchemists of the Dusk Sea	PlayStation 3	July 17, 2014	Yes	Yes	Yes	Yes
Ar Nosurge Plus: Ode to an Unborn Star	PlayStation Vita	October 2, 2014	Yes	Yes	Yes	No
Ciel Nosurge Offline: Ushinawareta Hoshi e Sasagu Uta	PlayStation Vita	October 2, 2014	Yes	No	No	No
Atelier Questboard	Android, iOS	October 17, 2014	Yes	No	No	No
Atelier Escha & Logy Plus: Alchemists of the Dusk Sky	PlayStation Vita	January 22, 2015	Yes	Yes	Yes	Yes
New Atelier Rorona: The Alchemist of Arland	Nintendo 3DS	June 4, 2015	Yes	No	No	No
Nights of Azure	PlayStation 3, PlayStation Vita	October 1, 2015	Yes	No	No	No
Nights of Azure	PlayStation 4	October 1, 2015	Yes	Yes	Yes	Yes
Atelier Sophie: The Alchemist of the Mysterious Book	PlayStation 3	November 19, 2015	Yes	No	No	No
Atelier Sophie: The Alchemist of the Mysterious Book	PlayStation 4, PlayStation Vita	November 19, 2015	Yes	Yes	Yes	Yes
Atelier Shallie Plus: Alchemists of the Dusk Sea	PlayStation Vita	March 3, 2016	Yes	Yes	Yes	No
Atelier Firis: The Alchemist and the Mysterious Journey	PlayStation 4, PlayStation Vita	November 2, 2016	Yes	Yes	Yes	Yes
Atelier Sophie: The Alchemist of the Mysterious Book	Microsoft Windows	February 7, 2017	Yes	Yes	Yes	Yes
Nights of Azure	Microsoft Windows	February 7, 2017	Yes	Yes	Yes	Yes
Atelier Firis: The Alchemist and the Mysterious Journey	Microsoft Windows	March 7, 2017	Yes	Yes	Yes	Yes
Blue Reflection	PlayStation 4	March 30, 2017	Yes	Yes	Yes	Yes
Blue Reflection	PlayStation Vita	March 30, 2017	Yes	No	No	No
Augmented Reality Girls Trinary	Android, iOS	April 12, 2017	Yes	No	No	No
Nights of Azure 2: Bride of the New Moon	Nintendo Switch, PlayStation 4	August 31, 2017	Yes	Yes	Yes	Yes
Nights of Azure 2: Bride of the New Moon	PlayStation Vita	August 31, 2017	Yes	No	No	No
Blue Reflection	Microsoft Windows	September 26, 2017	Yes	Yes	Yes	Yes
Nights of Azure 2: Bride of the New Moon	Microsoft Windows	October 24, 2017	Yes	Yes	Yes	Yes
Atelier Lydie & Suelle: The Alchemists and the Mysterious Paintings	Nintendo Switch, PlayStation 4	December 21, 2017	Yes	Yes	Yes	Yes
Atelier Lydie & Suelle: The Alchemists and the Mysterious Paintings	PlayStation Vita	December 21, 2017	Yes	No	No	No
Atelier Lydie & Suelle: The Alchemists and the Mysterious Paintings	Microsoft Windows	March 27, 2018	Yes	Yes	Yes	Yes
Atelier Arland Series Deluxe Pack	Microsoft Windows, Nintendo Switch, PlayStation 4	September 20, 2018	Yes	Yes	Yes	Yes
Atelier Online: Alchemists of the Bressisle	Android, iOS	October 3, 2018	Yes	No	No	No
Nelke & the Legendary Alchemists: Ateliers of the New World	Microsoft Windows, Nintendo Switch, PlayStation 4	January 31, 2019	Yes	Yes	Yes	Yes
Nelke & the Legendary Alchemists: Ateliers of the New World	PlayStation Vita	January 31, 2019	Yes	No	No	No
Atelier Lulua: The Scion of Arland	Microsoft Windows, Nintendo Switch, PlayStation 4	March 20, 2019	Yes	Yes	Yes	Yes
Atelier Ryza: Ever Darkness & the Secret Hideout	Microsoft Windows, Nintendo Switch, PlayStation 4	September 26, 2019	Yes	Yes	Yes	Yes
Atelier Dusk Trilogy Deluxe Pack	Microsoft Windows, Nintendo Switch, PlayStation 4	December 25, 2019	Yes	Yes	Yes	Yes
Fairy Tail	Microsoft Windows, Nintendo Switch, PlayStation 4	July 30, 2020	Yes	Yes	Yes	Yes
Atelier Ryza 2: Lost Legends & the Secret Fairy	Microsoft Windows, Nintendo Switch, PlayStation 4, PlayStation 5	December 3, 2020	Yes	Yes	Yes	Yes
Blue Reflection: Second Light	Microsoft Windows, Nintendo Switch, PlayStation 4	October 21, 2021	Yes	Yes	Yes	Yes
Atelier Sophie 2: The Alchemist of the Mysterious Dream	Microsoft Windows, Nintendo Switch, PlayStation 4	February 24, 2022	Yes	Yes	Yes	Yes
Atelier Ryza 3: Alchemist of the End & the Secret Key	Microsoft Windows, Nintendo Switch, PlayStation 4, PlayStation 5	March 24, 2023	Yes	Yes	Yes	Yes
Fairy Tail 2	Microsoft Windows, Nintendo Switch, PlayStation 4, PlayStation 5	December 11, 2024	Yes	Yes	Yes	Yes
Atelier Yumia: The Alchemist of Memories & the Envisioned Land	Microsoft Windows, Nintendo Switch, PlayStation 4, PlayStation 5, Xbox One, Xbox Series X/S	March 21, 2025	Yes	Yes	Yes	Yes
Atelier Yumia: The Alchemist of Memories & the Envisioned Land	Nintendo Switch 2	June 9, 2026	Yes	Yes	Yes	Yes
Atelier Resleriana: The Red Alchemist & the White Guardian	Microsoft Windows, Nintendo Switch, PlayStation 5	September 26, 2025	Yes	Yes	Yes	Yes
Atelier Resleriana: The Red Alchemist & the White Guardian	PlayStation 4	September 26, 2025	Yes	No	No	No
Blue Reflection Quartet	Microsoft Windows, Nintendo Switch, Nintendo Switch 2, PlayStation 5	July 30, 2026	Yes	Yes	Yes	Yes
Atelier Karia: The Night Kingdom & the Guide of Memories	Microsoft Windows, Nintendo Switch 2, PlayStation 5, Xbox Series X/S	February 25, 2027	Yes	Yes	Yes	Yes
The Apothecary Diaries: The False Imperial Brother	Microsoft Windows, Nintendo Switch, Nintendo Switch 2, PlayStation 5	2027	Yes	Yes	Yes	Yes

=== Cancelled ===
- Chronos Materia (クロノス・マテリア)

== Other media ==
Gust sells various licensed goods of their products from their online shop, such as anime, manga, music CDs, and drama CDs.

Gust maintains an extensive official fan-oriented web site, Salburg.com, featuring game information, news, contests, write-in columns, employee journals, fan-participation campaigns, mini-games, and shopping.
