= Nights of Azure =

2015 video game

- Developer: Gust
- Publisher: Koei Tecmo
- Producer: Keisuke Kikuchi
- Artist: Yoshiku
- Composers: Kazuki Yanagawa; Daisuke Achiwa; Hayato Asano
- Platforms: PlayStation 3, PlayStation 4, PlayStation Vita, Microsoft Windows
- Release: PlayStation 3, PlayStation Vita: JP: October 1, 2015; PlayStation 4: JP: October 1, 2015; NA: March 29, 2016; EU: April 1, 2016; AU: April 8, 2016; Microsoft Windows: WW: February 7, 2017
- Genre: Action role-playing
- Mode: Single-player

Nights of Azure (Note: Japanese: よるのないくに, Hepburn: Yoru no Nai Kuni; lit. "Land Without Night") is a 2015 action role-playing video game developed by Gust and published by Koei Tecmo for the PlayStation 3, PlayStation 4, PlayStation Vita and Microsoft Windows. The PlayStation 4 version received a North American release on March 29, 2016, with a European release following on April 1, 2016, and a Microsoft Windows release on February 7, 2017.

The game was followed up by a sequel titled Nights of Azure 2: Bride of the New Moon, released August 2017 in Japan, and October 2017 worldwide.

== Gameplay ==
The game features an RPG battle system where characters fight alongside contracted demons known as Servans. These demons can be summoned during battle through the use of SP, and are categorized into attacker and support types. As they become stronger through subsequent battles, they gain new abilities.

Arnice can also land attack chains using light, heavy and special attacks, with each chain gradually filling a transformation gauge. When gauge is full, the player can trigger a transformation which increases her offensive power. This demon form allows her to control flames, while her rabbit form focuses on speed and melee combat, and her phantom form improves her recovery capabilities. She is also able to transform her blood into creating different types of blood power weapons depending on the situation, such as daggers and longswords, which change her attack moveset and the abilities of summoned demons.

Drops of blue blood are gained by defeating enemies and completing quests, and they can be spent as currency at certain shops or used to level up the main playable character, Arnice. The Ende Hotel acts as a hub world, allowing the player to accept quests, buy items, plan daytime activities, change equipment, and save the game.

The game also contains an optional arena where players can take on various challenges and earn rewards, and these include battles with special restrictions placed upon them and fighting against enemies within a labyrinth.

== Setting ==
The game follows the journey of two girls and is set on the fictional island-kingdom of Ruswal, where nights are plagued by Azure-blooded demons, where no one sleeps at night. Although it is dangerous for humans to leave their homes after dark, the brave knights known as the Curia are trained to fend off the ever growing threat. After humans emerged victorious from the battle against the demonic Nightlord many years ago, the blue blood from the monster scattered and polluted those who bathed in it, changing them into creatures known as fiends, which steal night-time from the people. Although Arnice has polluted blood, her heart remained intact.

== Characters ==
- Arnice (アーナス, Arnas): The protagonist of the game, who is a holy knight serving a mysterious organization known as the "Curia." She is part human and part monster, having had contact with the blue blood of the Nightlord, and she has a bloodsucking ability which arises from her monster side, and can use her own blood to create a demon sword. Voiced by Mao Ichimichi.
- Lilysse (リュリーティス, Lyuritis): A saint who is destined to seal what remains of the Nightlord, and is a close friend of Arnice. Voiced by Hiromi Igarashi.
- Christophorus (クリストフォロス, Christophoros): A pure-blooded demon that lives within the opera house. Voiced by Tomoyo Kurosawa.
- Simon (サイモン): A hotel manager and cafe owner. Voiced by Masaki Terasoma.
- Corrine (コーリン): A member of the holy knights and Arnice's senior. Voiced by Ayane Sakura.
- Professor Alucard (有角教授, Professor Arukado): A self-declared researcher of monsters. Voiced by Yoshitsugu Matsuoka.
- Lloyd (ロイド): A merchant who is a realist. He is well-informed with apparitions and the Curia, and has a hidden side. Voiced by Satoshi Hino.
- Mistral (ミストラル): A bewitching, pure-blooded apparition who leads visitors astray with her sweet fragrance. She seemingly seeks for the soul of the Nightlord, although she is currently secluded to her palace. Voiced by Eriko Matsui.

== Development ==
The game was developed under the leadership of development producer Keisuke Kikuchi who has previously worked on the Deception and Fatal Frame game series, while the general producer was Tadanobu Inoue. The character sprites and background art were illustrated by Yoshiku. The game, along with the other Social Gust game, Atelier Sophie, experienced delays in release citing final adjustments as the reason for delay.

First-print copies of the game featured DLC codes for Gust from the Hyperdimension Neptunia series as a subordinate demon.

== Reception ==
Reception

Aggregate score
Aggregator	Score
Metacritic	(PS4) 67/100 (PC) 64/100

Review scores
Publication	Score
Destructoid	5/10
Famitsu	32/40
Hardcore Gamer	4/5
RPGFan	68/100

Famitsu gave the game a review score of 32/40. The game sold a total of 79,227 physical retail copies across all three platforms within its first week of release in Japan.

The game received "mixed or average reviews", according to review aggregator Metacritic.
