= Mana Khemia: Alchemists of Al-Revis =

2007 video game

- Developer: Gust Co. Ltd.
- Publishers: JP: Gust Co. Ltd.; NA: NIS America; EU: NIS Europe
- Composers: Ken Nakagawa, Daisuke Achiwa
- Series: Atelier
- Platforms: PlayStation 2, PlayStation Portable
- Release: PlayStation 2: JP: June 21, 2007; NA: March 31, 2008; EU: March 27, 2009; PlayStation Portable: JP: September 25, 2008; NA: March 10, 2009; EU: March 27, 2009
- Genre: Role-playing
- Mode: Single-player

Mana Khemia: Alchemists of Al-Revis (Note: Japanese: マナケミア ～学園の錬金術士たち～, Hepburn: Mana Kemia ~Gakuen no Renkinjutsushi-tachi~) is a role-playing video game developed by Gust Co. Ltd. in 2007 for the PlayStation 2. The game is the ninth entry to Gust's Atelier series and incorporates elements of standard turn-based combat and alchemy. A PlayStation Portable version was released which included additional features.

== Gameplay ==
Mana Khemia shares many common elements with its predecessors, the Atelier Iris trilogy.

At the core of the game is alchemy through which the player can create weapons, armor, usable items, and complex ingredients for these recipes. The player is required to gather core materials through field exploration, spoils of combat, or by purchasing them in the shops. Each item carries fundamental properties that include elemental and special abilities, and character stat improvements, that can be infused into equipment. Through the creation of new items, these properties can transfer over into the new item. A new "alchemy wheel" allows the player to adjust the quality of each ingredient as it is added to the mix, for better or worse, in order to alter the final item's properties as well. Recipes for items are learned over the course of the game by finding or buying recipe books, conversing with characters, or can be extrapolated from existing recipes by altering the ingredients list.

When in the field, the player can opt to avoid encounters with monsters by running and jumping over them, but also may attempt to strike first to go into battle. Mana Khemia uses a turn-based system similar to previous Atelier Iris games. Once the player has more than three characters in the party, he or she can then have up to three characters in reserve; these characters can switch in during a normal turn, or be called in at the end of one character's attack to provide an additional blow, or be called in to replace a character about to be attacked. The swapped out characters require a number of turns to recover before being called in again. As the player becomes able to inflict more damage, they can activate "Burst Mode" that temporarily increases the damage from each attack; this mode rewards the player with a large number of hits. Additionally, about mid-game, Burst Mode can lead to a "Finishing Burst" that requires the player to meet a certain condition while Burst Mode is activated, such as striking with each team member, or healing a certain amount of damage; this allows for a special powerful finishing move to be unleashed by one of the characters.

Both alchemy and combat are necessary to grow the characters. Unlike typical role-playing games, there are no experience points or characters levels. Instead, through combat, characters earn "action points" which are used in the character-specific "grow book" to unlock new skills, and character bonuses such as additional health or mana points. However, these bonuses are tied to completing the recipes for specific items in that book. The grow book is presented as a graph of synthesizable items. The bonuses for an item cannot be acquired using action points until an adjacent item on the graph, and the item itself, has been made.

The game is presented as a series of terms at a school. Each term is made up of several weeks, typically starting and ending with an event, ultimately leading to a key battle to be won. In between, the player is generally required to complete two or three courses, earning a grade depending on how well the course was completed. This is then followed by two or three days of free time. If the player should fail to make a decent cumulative grade by the end of courses, they will need to spend one day of free time in detention, doing required tasks. Once in free time, the player is free to take odd jobs, talk with characters, and perform side quests related to the other members of the party.

== Plot ==
The game's main focus is on the lead protagonist, Vayne Aurelius, the son of a legendary alchemist named Theofratus who had disappeared sometime after Vayne's birth. Since then, Vayne has led the life of a hermit, his only companion being a Mana in cat form named Sulpher. Vayne is invited to the Al-Revis Academy for alchemy training by Zeppel, one of the professors. He is quickly indoctrinated into the school by becoming part of an atelier led by Flay Gunnar (an older student who is known as The Defender of Justice) along with two other students, Jess (a clumsy girl who is nevertheless adept at alchemy), and Nikki (an impulsive beastgirl). They are soon joined by Pamela (the school's resident ghost), Anna (an 11-year-old master swordsman), Roxis (the son of a famous family of alchemists who is quickly forced to join the workshop by Flay), and Muppy (an alien the group discovers on an assignment). The eight of them are able to succeed at completing assignments, learn the skills of alchemy, and allow the workshop to prosper.

== Soundtrack ==
The soundtrack was composed by Ken Nakagawa and Daisuke Achiwa and includes opening song "Run For Your Life"' by Haruka Shimotsuki and ending song "TOGGLE" by Yuuki Mizusawa. It was released May 30, 2007 in Japan by Team Entertainment.

Disc 1, Tracks:
1. "Run for your Life" (also on Japanese release)
2. "Nostalgic School House" ( なつかしき学び舎よ )
3. "The Dream of the Black Cat" ( 黒猫の見た夢 )
4. "A Boy's Worries" ( 少年の悩み )
5. "To the Future of Dreams" (Chorus Version) ( 夢の未来へ~合唱版~ )
6. "The Day We Met, the Moment We Parted" ( 出会いの日、別れの刻 )
7. "Welcome to the Magic Workshop" ( ようこそ魔法の工房へ )
8. "The Ally of Justice Has Arrived" ( 正義の味方がやってきた )
9. "Homeroom" ( ホームルーム )
10. "Town of Clear Skies" ( 晴天の街 )
11. "Pulse" ( 鼓動 )
12. "Splendid Force" (also on Japanese release)
13. "Victorious High Touch" ( 勝利のハイタッチ )
14. "Nice Work" ( おつかれさ～ん )
15. "Result Announcement" ( 結果発表 )
16. "Vayne and His Pleasant Friends" ( ヴェインと愉快な仲間たち )
17. "Whistling Girl" ( 口笛少女 )
18. "Welcome to the Magic Workshop" ( ようこそ魔法の工房へ~ほのぼのアレンジ )
19. "The Store Lady & Old Man Medley" ( 購買部のおねいさん&おぢさんメドレー )
20. "Wind Banquet" ( 風の宴 )
21. "Pitch Black" ( 漆黒 )
22. "Hurry Up!" (also on Japanese release)
23. "The Menace" (also on Japanese release)
24. "Takedown of Defeat" ( 敗北のテイクダウン )
25. "Taking the Unknown Route" ( 知らない道を行こう )
26. "Ah, Discipline Committee of Youth" ( 嗚呼、青春の風紀委員 )
27. "Stupid Hair Saga" ( アホ毛サーガ )
28. "Legend of Feigned Ignorance" ( オトボケ伝説 )
29. "Let's Try Even Harder" ( もっとがんばりましょう )
30. "Tick Away! Rhythm of Time" ( 刻め！時のリズム )
31. "Sailbird" (also on Japanese release)
32. "Hallucinate Bell" (also on Japanese release)
33. "Today's the School Festival" ( 今日は学園祭 )
34. "A Friend's Hand" ( 友達の手 )
35. "To the Future of Dreams" ( 夢の未来へ )
36. "Sirius" ( シリウス ) by Marie

Disc Length: 66 mins 30 sec

Disc 2, Tracks

1. "Nee" ( ねぇ) by Marie
2. "Onto the Next Step Part 1" ( 次なるステップへ その1 )
3. "Grasshopper" (also on Japanese release)
4. "Absorbed by the Glasses" ( メガネが耽る )
5. "Crystalized" (also on Japanese release)
6. "Together with New Friends" ( 新たな仲間と共に )
7. "A Rusted Neigh" ( 錆びついた嘶き )
8. "Looming Conspiracy" ( 迫り来る陰謀 )
9. "Running Shadow" ( 奔る影 )
10. "Riding on the Winds Crossing over the Hills" ( 丘を越える風に乗って )
11. "Mansion of Slumbering Wisdom" ( 叡智眠りし館 )
12. "Hateful Mana-Khemialchemy" ( ウラメシマナケミアルケミー )
13. "Ghost Girl for Mana-Khemia" ( 幽霊少女 for マナケミア )
14. "Repulsion" (also on Japanese release)
15. "Gavotte" ( がぼっと )
16. "Memorial of Time" ( 刻の碑
17. "A Treasure Obtained" ( 手に入れた財宝 )
18. "The Life of Paon" ( パオーン列伝 )
19. "Rectangular Wave of Love" ( 愛の矩形波 )
20. "Memories of the Great Tree" ( 巨樹の記憶 )
21. "Disrupter" (also on Japanese release)
22. "Sunset" ( 夕茜 )
23. "Onto the Next Step Part 2" ( 次なるステップへ その2 )
24. "Flowers Blooming in the Empty Sky" ( 虚空に咲く花 )
25. "A Smile of Ice" ( 氷の微笑 )
26. "Nefertiti" (also on Japanese release)
27. "Silent Queasiness" ( 静かな眩暈 0
28. "Laments of the Rain" ( 雨の慟哭 )
29. "The Voice of Darkness that Comes from the Abyss" ( 闇の声、深淵より )
30. "One More Demise" ( もう一つの終焉 )
31. "A Gap to the Darkness" ( 闇への間隙 )
32. "With Power and Light in my Hands" ( この手に光と力を )
33. "STIGMATA" by Noriko Mitose (also on Japanese release)
34. "At the Side of an Illusion" ( 幻想の畔 )
35. "TOGGLE" (also on Japanese release)

Disc Length: 71 mins. 29 secs.

== Reception ==
Mana Khemia: Alchemists of Al-Revis

Aggregate score
Aggregator	Score
Metacritic	69/100

Review scores
Publication	Score
1Up.com	C
Famitsu	31/40
Game Informer	7/10
GameSpot	7.5/10
GamesRadar+	3/5
GameZone	5.5/10
IGN	5.7/10
Jeuxvideo.com	17/20
PlayStation: The Official Magazine	3.5/5
RPGamer	3/5
RPGFan	90/100

The game received "average" reviews according to the review aggregation website Metacritic. In Japan, Famitsu gave it a score of 31 out of 40.

== Re-release ==
A port for the PSP system that was released in Japan on September 25, 2008 under the title Mana-Khemia Gakuen no Renkinjutsushi-tachi Portable Plus (マナケミア 〜学園の錬金術士たち〜 ポータブルプラス, Mana Kemia ~Gakuen no Renkinjutsushi-tachi~ Pōtaburu Purasu), and in North America on March 10, 2009, branded under the name Mana Khemia: Student Alliance. There are added features like multiplayer battles, Jump Start function to allow the game to load faster, and more items that can be synthesized. In multiplayer battles, enemies may drop rare items that cannot be found in the main game.

=== Reception ===
Mana Khemia: Student Alliance

Aggregate score
Aggregator	Score
Metacritic	41/100

Review scores
Publication	Score
GamePro	2/5
GameRevolution	C−
GamesRadar+	3/5
GameZone	5.5/10
IGN	2.7/10
Jeuxvideo.com	6/20
PlayStation: The Official Magazine	3/5
RPGamer	1.5/5
RPGFan	(PSN) 65/100 (UMD) 43/100

Student Alliance received "unfavorable" reviews, more so than its PS2 counterpart, according to Metacritic. This was due to its additional loading times, but this can be remedied by playing the download rather than the UMD or using the install function.

== Sequel ==
A sequel was released on May 29, 2008 in Japan and in North America on August 25, 2009. Its story is set 15 years after the original game, and the only returning characters are Flay, Tony, and Zeppel.
