= Fairy Tail (video game) =

2020 video game

- Cover of the PS4 edition
- Developer: Gust
- Publisher: Koei Tecmo
- Producer: Keisuke Kikuchi
- Series: Fairy Tail
- Platforms: Nintendo Switch; PlayStation 4; PC
- Release: JP/EU: July 30, 2020; NA: July 31, 2020
- Genre: Role-playing
- Mode: Single-player

Fairy Tail is a 2020 role-playing video game developed by Gust and published by Koei Tecmo. Based on the manga series Fairy Tail by Hiro Mashima, it follows the adventures of Natsu Dragneel and the other members of the titular wizard guild. It was released for the Nintendo Switch, PlayStation 4, and PC in Japan and Europe on July 30, 2020, and in North America a day later. Reviewers praised the game's combat mechanics, but criticized the story as lacking accessibility for those not already familiar with the Fairy Tail franchise. A sequel, Fairy Tail 2, was released on December 12, 2024.

== Gameplay ==
In Fairy Tail, players control a party of characters and traverse the game world with the goal of restoring the titular guild to its former glory. The guild itself acts as a base, where players can accept missions, which when completed raises its renown via a lettered ranking system. Jewels (the in-game currency) are also earned from missions and, in addition to buying items, can be used to upgrade the guild's interior, such as adding a magic shop or the ability to take on more difficult quests.

Battles are turn-based, with a focus on chaining attacks and performing combination specials. Players use menus to select physical or magic-based attacks, use items to heal status ailments or restore HP or MP, defend, or flee from the fight; some fights can not be fled. Attacks slowly fill the Fairy Gauge that, when full, allows the player to trigger a Magic Chain, which allows party members to attack one after the other for less MP, or end the chain with a massive Finisher. After taking enough damage, individual characters can trigger Awakening, which grants brief stat bonuses and, on some characters, new forms and moves. Before being triggered, Awakening can be expended to avoid an incoming attack, or follow up an ally's attack with another. Characters are knocked out when they run out of either HP or MP. Enemies are placed on a 3×3 grid and the abilities of the player characters each have specific ranges and areas that they can affect. Some abilities can even reposition enemies on the grid.

Once the party defeats the enemies by winning the battle, each member gains experience points in order to reach new levels. When a character gains a new level, the statistics (stats) of the character are upgraded. Player characters and enemies alike have elemental compatibilities and weaknesses, based on a system of seven types of magic: Non-Elemental, Fire, Ice, Holy, Demon, Light, and Dark. Winning battles can also reward players with jewels and items dropped by the enemies, such as Ethernano Particles, which are absorbed by party members whose element matches that of those dropped and restores some of their MP. Equipable items called Lacrima may be dropped by enemies, bought, or crafted at the guild. They are separated into three categories; those that boost character stats, those that increase the likelihood of inflicting status ailments on enemies, and rare lacrimas formed from recipes that can only be equipped by a specific character.

== Plot ==
After the strongest members of Fairy Tail stop the dark guild Grimoire Heart on Tenrou Island, the dragon Acnologia appears and seemingly destroys the island while they are on it. Seven years later, the Fairy Tail guild has fallen into disrepair, becoming the weakest in Fiore. However, the missing members return, having been protected by magic cast by Mavis Vermillion's spirit, and start building up the guild's reputation again. Fairy Tail decides to participate in the Grand Magic Games, a tournament held in Fiore's capital Crocus to decide the most powerful guild, and takes first place. At the same time, Fiore's royal family initiates a plan using a device called Eclipse that is said to be capable of defeating an army of 10,000 dragons that are coming from 400 years in the past to ravage the kingdom. However, Princess Hisui was tricked by a Rogue Cheney from the future into allowing the dragons to come through the door of Eclipse so that he can control them and defeat Acnologia, but only seven successfully come through before Eclipse is closed. All the guilds participating in the Games team up to combat the dragons, while Fairy Tail defeats Future Rogue and destroys Eclipse, sending him and the dragons back to their own times.

Tartaros, a dark guild composed of demons created by Zeref, then assassinates past and former members of the Magic Council. When some of its members are hurt in one of the attacks, Fairy Tail vows revenge. It is eventually learned that Tartaros is aiming to detonate Face, a pulse bomb designed to neutralize magic across Fiore that is connected to the lives of three unknown council members, and revive END, Zeref's strongest demon. While Fairy Tail assaults their base, Tartaros activates Face. Mard Geer, the leader of Tartaros, then transforms the base, trapping the members of Fairy Tail. After Lucy Heartfilia frees her comrades by summoning the Celestial Spirit King, who destroys the base, Fairy Tail retreats. Launching another attack, Fairy Tail learns that Face is not one bomb, but a network of three thousand that is set to go off in one hour. After they succeed in killing Tartaros' top members, Acnologia appears but is held off by Igneel while Natsu Dragneel and others defeat Mard Geer. The Face bombs are then destroyed by other dragons, and the Book of END is taken by Zeref. Acnologia flees after killing Igneel, and the other dragons disappear. Natsu sets out on a journey and Fairy Tail is disbanded by its master, Makarov Dreyar. Later, in a monologue, Zeref reveals that Natsu is END (Etherious Natsu Dragneel), a demon he created from the body of his dead younger brother.

In the epilogue one year later, Lucy reunites with Natsu and the two set out to find the other members of Fairy Tail and revive the guild. Their mission also sees them stop the Avatar guild, who summon Ikusa-Tsunagi, one of the Yakuma Eighteen Battle Gods. With the members back together, Fairy Tail gets approved as a guild by the new Magic Council, and find Makarov before continuing their S-Rank wizards examination, which was interrupted by Grimoire Heart eight years earlier.

== Development ==
In September 2019, it was announced that Gust were developing a role-playing video game based on the manga series Fairy Tail under the direct supervision of its creator Hiro Mashima. Keisuke Kikuchi, a producer at the game's publisher Koei Tecmo, said that Mashima gave them a lot of feedback during the development process and was looking at everything from the viewpoint of making the fans happy. When deciding what story arcs of the large manga series to adapt for the game, Kikuchi explained that two fan-favorites stood out to them in particular, the Grand Magic Games and Tartaros arcs. Following the events on Tenrou Island, the titular guild is run down and needs to be restored to its former glory, with one of the game's core systems being the guild's development and expansion. Playable character choices and fan requests also played a large role in deciding when to set the video game; according to Kikuchi, "the best place to start would be in the middle of the franchise where some of the very popular characters have already made an appearance". Characters are voiced by the same voice actors from Fairy Tail's anime adaptation.

Kikuchi said the goal was to ensure that fans of the franchise would enjoy the game, but felt many aspects of the series "work perfectly as a game [for those unfamiliar with the original work], such as the unique characters who grow stronger throughout the story and the world itself, which is overflowing with fantasy elements." He also said that players could watch the anime to learn more about the story if this is their first foray into Fairy Tail. Kikuchi felt the turn-based combat made the game more accessible and easier to display the characters working together. He cited the "duel" system that lets players fight their fellow guild members one on one, and the ability to use "Extreme Magic" that destroy background objects via the "over damage" system as elements unique to Fairy Tail. Although characters have elemental weaknesses, the developers balanced the game to allow fans to continue using their favorite characters and not have to sacrifice their preferences to advance.

Originally planned for a worldwide release on March 19, 2020, Koei Tecmo announced in February 2020 that they were delaying Fairy Tail until June 25 of that year to further polish the game. In May 2020, it was announced that the game would be delayed again due to the COVID-19 pandemic. In July, Kikuchi said many of the developers were still working from home. Fairy Tail was released in Japan and Europe on July 30, 2020, and in North America on July 31, 2020. The digital deluxe edition comes with additional costumes for characters, including one for Lucy based on the character Ryza from Gust's Atelier Ryza: Ever Darkness & the Secret Hideout. An additional costume for Erza was offered for free until August 14, 2020. A free update added a "Photo Mode" on August 6, 2020. Four additional playable characters and three sets of additional costumes for characters, 48 in total, were released as paid downloadable content that same day.

== Reception ==
Reception

Aggregate score
Aggregator	Score
Metacritic	(PC) 66/100 (PS4) 71/100 (Switch) 69/100

Review scores
Publication	Score
Famitsu	32/40
Nintendo Life	6/10
Nintendo World Report	8/10
Push Square	7/10
Shacknews	8/10
Gayming Magazine	3.5/5

According to Famitsu, Fairy Tail sold 28,683 units in Japan its first week, 15,447 on Switch and 13,236 on PlayStation 4. In October 2020, Koei Tecmo announced that it had sold 310,000 copies worldwide.

Jenni Lada of Siliconera gave the game an 8 out of 10 rating with strong praise for the combat system and its treatment of the characters, but cited how it expects players to already be familiar with the story of Fairy Tail as the "only real downside". Inverse's Just Lunning praised the game for simplifying traditional turn-based gameplay in an "intuitive way, using elemental interactions in a way that requires strategy and planning but still feels simple enough that anyone can understand", but criticized it for omitting too much of the source material, while also making little attempt to endear its characters to newcomers. His 7/10 review ended with, "Fairy Tail strips away far too much of what's great about the popular anime and manga franchise to feel like a worthy adaptation. Even so, it's an enjoyable RPG in its own right."

Writing for Collider, Dave Trumbore praised the turn-based combat as "refreshingly fun" and enjoyed seeing the social bonds between characters evolve, but called the tasks and missions "repetitive and paint-by-number". He finished with, Fairy Tail "remains a solid enough title that's intended for fans of the series, but as a standalone game, it's just so-so." In a 6/10 review for Nintendo Life, Mitch Vogel wrote that the game has "occasional glimpses of the much greater RPG that Fairy Tail could be, but alas, it's never really given the chance to spread its wings." He called the combat system well-made and multi-layered, but felt it lacked difficulty. He also praised the game's detailed art, but cited poor frame rate performance on the Switch version.

== Sequel ==
A sequel, Fairy Tail 2, was released for PlayStation 4, PlayStation 5, Nintendo Switch and PC in Japan on December 12, 2024, and in North America and Europe a day later. Due to time differences, however, the PC version released in the West on December 11, 2024.
