= Atelier Sophie 2: The Alchemist of the Mysterious Dream =

2022 video game

- Developer: Gust
- Publisher: Koei Tecmo
- Directors: Yuki Katsumata; Masaki Sato
- Producer: Junzo Hosoi
- Designer: Ryoji Aono
- Programmer: Yuki Wakizaka
- Artists: Yuugen; NOCO
- Writers: Genki Tomimatsu; Yuya Jin
- Composers: Kazuki Yanagawa; Daisuke Achiwa; Tatsuya Yano; Ryudai Abe
- Series: Atelier
- Platforms: PlayStation 4; Microsoft Windows; Nintendo Switch
- Release: February 24, 2022
- Genre: Role-playing
- Mode: Single-player

Atelier Sophie 2: The Alchemist of the Mysterious Dream (Note: Japanese: ソフィーのアトリエ2 ～不思議な夢の錬金術士～, Hepburn: Sofī no Atorie 2 ~ Fushigi na Yume no Renkinjutsushi ~) is a 2022 Japanese role-playing video game developed by Gust. It was released in February 2022 for Microsoft Windows (via Steam), Nintendo Switch, and PlayStation 4. It is the 23rd game in the Atelier series and the fourth game in its Mysterious subseries, while chronologically set between the events of Atelier Sophie: The Alchemist of the Mysterious Book and Atelier Firis: The Alchemist and the Mysterious Journey. It is also the second game of the series with a returning protagonist, after Atelier Ryza 2: Lost Legends & the Secret Fairy.

== Gameplay ==
Atelier Sophie 2 is a turn-based role-playing game. A team which eventually grows to six playable characters faces enemies, with the player selecting an action for each character on their turn. The team is divided into three members in the front and three members in support. Attacking grants Technical Points (TP), a resource that can be spent in a number of ways: defensively bringing in party members in the rear to take a hit while blocking and swap with the front party member in a "Support Guard"; performing linked "Twin Attacks" between a front row member and their support character; and so on. If the main team in front is defeated, the backup team takes their place. Actions can include dealing damage of a variety of types which is modified by whether it hits specific elemental or other weaknesses; buffs and debuffs that increase or decrease statistics; healing wounded party members; and more. A two-team battle system somewhat similar to this was in Atelier Lydie & Suelle.

As the game progresses, there are both main plot progression tasks as well as sidequests. In-game, a bulletin board in Roytale, the main town, offers the optional sidequests and related rewards for completing them, such as defeating monsters or finding rare items. The characters in the party also have their own storylines that the player may choose to complete. Doing so increases their Friendship with Sophie and unlocks bonuses.

Traversing the world requires gems that each correspond to the kind of weather that appears when they are used. For example, when it is rainy, boxes and barrels may float in such a way that Sophie can skip across them. In the same area, that path won't be traversable because there is no body of water, but the land underneath that body of water will be exposed. This introduces a puzzle element to exploring, especially once multiple water levels are possible in an area and they can be frozen into platforms with snowy weather. These gems may only be used on alters that correspond to the correct weather. They also have a finite number of charges and the use of alchemy is required to fill them.

There is a new gathering mechanic where some spots will glow intensely and Sophie will play a minigame in order to (potentially) get better versions of the materials she's looking for.

=== Alchemy ===
As with other games in the Atelier series, there is an alchemy subgame. The player gathers materials from Erde Wiege's landscapes, defeating enemies, and completing sidequests and takes them back to an atelier in Roytale. There they can synthesize and transmute the raw materials into usable items and equipment for the party. Atelier Sophie 2 uses the basic structure of the alchemy system from the previous Mysterious games, with new mechanics. The player discovers how to create new items by completing assignments on the "Recipe Tree," but the way the items are synthesized is always the same. It works in four stages: selecting the output, choosing the materials, placing the materials, and choosing the new item's inherited traits.

1. The player chooses to have Sophie or Plachta perform the synthesis of a particular item. Some items unique to one or the other. Both alchemists have an Alchemy Level that can be raised by successfully synthesizing items.
2. The player chooses the required materials from their container. Each ability slot has a bar showing the effect level of an element: fire, ice, lightning, air, and light. Materials contribute up to four components for raising the corresponding element's effect level, unlocking higher-level abilities. To unlock difficult-to-reach abilities, the player can choose materials with link components. The player's choice of a catalyst provides bonuses that may make the higher levels and more powerful abilities easier to reach.
3. The player places the materials' components within a square grid. A component is cast out when any of its pips is overwritten by another component, and the final effect level is determined by the components that remain in the grid at the end. On the grid, certain squares may be marked to give a bonus effect level or prohibit components from occupying it. If the player wishes to unlock the higher-value abilities of an element, they must create horizontal or vertical chains of link components' star pips. The other five party members can trigger "assist skills" if the player makes long links. Additional skills unlock as the characters' friendships levels with Sophie increase. There is a "super success" chance that can allow the player to get bonus quality points at the end of synthesis that is increased when the player fills more grid squares and creates rows or columns five pips long.
4. The player selects up to three traits for the new item, from the materials' heritable traits that grant special effects. Two traits will combine into one higher-order trait if they are compatible. The player indicates that they are satisfied with their synthesis and the game calculates whether it is a Super Success.

== Plot ==
=== Characters ===
There are six playable characters in Atelier Sophie 2, which features the eponymous Sophie Neuenmuller (Yuuka Aisaka). Following the events of the first game, she leaves her hometown of Kirchen Bell to become a state-licensed alchemist and end up in a parallel world called Erde Wiege. On a quest to reunite with her mentor and friend, Plachta (Yuka Iguchi), she meets a younger version of Plachta who has not met Sophie before and is still a novice alchemist. This Plachta has been in Erde Wiege for some time before Sophie arrives, and she has her own atelier in the outskirts of town. Another surprise for Sophie is that a young version of her late grandmother, Ramizel Erlenmeyer (Rie Takahashi), is alive and perhaps the longest-berthed resident. The residents consider her their unofficial mayor. The other playable characters are Alette Claretie (Aoi Yūki), a merchant obsessed with scraping together money; Olias Enders (Tomoaki Maeno), a charismatic yet self-absorbed bodyguard held in high esteem; and Diebold Lewerenz (Kengo Kawanishi), a former knight who has become a stoic bodyguard.

Other members of the cast play supporting roles. Elvira (Reina Ueda) is the creator of Erde Wiege and is worshiped by the residents as a goddess. The tavern where Sophie's group receives requests is run by its burned out proprietor, Katrina "Kati" Balbastre (Manami Numakura), and her young friend who actually serves all the customers, Gnome Dumortier (Yūko Ōno). The game's duplication services are provided by Pirka (Yukimi Hayase), an experienced merchant who took Alette under her wing.

=== Story ===
Following the events of the first game, the alchemists Sophie and Plachta, with Plachta still stuck in a doll's body, leave the town of Kirchen Bell on a journey for Sophie to earn her alchemist certification. When they get close to a strange tree, both are pulled into a mysterious black void. Separated from Plachta, Sophie awakens in the city of Roytale and is taken in by two merchants, Pirka and Alette, who explains that they are in the parallel world of Erde Wiege, created by the goddess Elvira and inhabited by individuals chosen across multiple periods of time by her. Sophie moves to an atelier that she shares with another alchemist whom she discovers to be a younger version of Plachta, summoned to Erde Wiege before she loses her human body.

To search for Plachta, Sophie joins forces with the young Plachta, Alette, the bodyguard Olias, and the former knight Diebold. Finally, Sophie meets and teams up with her grandmother Ramizel, also summoned from her younger days. Ramizel, who is Elvira's only friend, eventually deduces that she is involved with Plachta's disappearance and the party confronts her. Elvira reveals that Plachta's soul was separated from her doll body when she was brought to Erde Wiege and was looking after her body since then. Using her alchemy, Sophie locates Plachta's soul and reattaches it to her doll body. By Ramizel's suggestion, Elvira starts interacting with the other inhabitants of Roytale and nominates Plachta as the new mayor. Some time later, the party is tasked to investigate a new breed of monsters with strange powers, named "Groll". After the Groll attack one of the Dream Cores, magical stones who act as cornerstones to Erde Wiege and possess some of Roytale's citizens, turning them apathetic, Sophie and the others discover that they are vicious creatures who prey on dreams. Plachta uses her alchemy to create a device to ward off the Groll while Elvira makes the citizens recover by extracting the Groll from their bodies, but the process corrupts her and she flees out of fear of being a risk to others.

Sophie, Young Plachta and Ramizel devise a plan to rescue Elvira from the Groll's influence. As the party sets to confront Elvira, they learn through her memories that she was always alone, only able to watch silently over the dreams of others and created Erde Wiege using the Dream Cores from pieces of her own power so that she could interact with Ramizel and the others, but in doing so she violated one of the gods' sacred rules, which led to the appearance of the Groll. Having lost control of herself, Elvira attacks the party, but they manage to weaken her long enough for Ramizel to extract the Groll from her body, saving her. Back to Roytale, Elvira decides to send all citizens back to the real world and destroy Erde Wiege so that she can regain her full powers and prevent the Groll from reappearing at the cost of being alone again, but to ease her solitude, Sophie creates an artifact that allows Elvira to communicate with others inside their dreams, much to her joy. Before departing, Young Plachta decides to have Elvira erase her memories to ensure that her future is unaltered and she will eventually reunite with Sophie. The party leaves Erde Wiege, except for Ramizel who accompanies Elvira one last time in her journey to recover the Dream Cores before also leaving. Sophie and Plachta awaken back at the real world and continue their journey, their next destination being the mining city of Ertona, setting the events of Atelier Firis.

== Development ==
Gust released enhanced ports and remasters of the Mysterious games in the Atelier series in 2021. This included setting up plot points in Sophie 2 in the new additions.

The artists from the first Atelier Sophie game, NOCO and Yuugen, returned to provide updated character designs. Both were freelancers with significant latitude to create as they wished. NOCO explored eleven new approaches to Sophie's design, but decided that he liked something akin to the first game the best. Yuugen noted that the 3D modeling was quite different than the illustration work he usually did. He declined to give the modelers detailed requests, preferring to tell them the impression the design would evoke. However, he was quite particular about the faces because he believed those were the most important part.

Preview footage of the game showed a significant graphical improvement from the previous Mysterious games, the last of which came out in 2017, and larger fields reminiscent of the previous Atelier game, Atelier Ryza 2.

Unlike the original Atelier Sophie's localization, an English voice track was not created for Sophie 2; the game's dialogue is set in Japanese. Many earlier Atelier localizations came with English dubs, but Atelier Lyddie & Suelle (2017) did not. Neither did the follow-up, Atelier Ryza, which sold so well that Gust did not order a dub for its sequel either. However, after releasing Atelier Sophie 2, Koei Tecmo surveyed fans about their localization preferences. One of the questions asked if they wanted an English dub to be produced.

== Release ==
The public first became aware of Atelier Sophie 2 when it was rated by the Australian Classification Review Board on September 15, 2021. Gust then created a special website to celebrate Atelier's 25th anniversary and used it to announce that the next game in the series would be revealed at the Tokyo Games Show 2021. Their parent company, Koei Tecmo, followed through on October 3, announcing the game with its February 25, 2022 release date. A limited edition featuring physical items like an art book and an exclusive costume for Sophie was also offered for pre-order.

In the lead-up to the release, there was a cross-promotion with Tales of Arise and Blue Reflection: Second Light. Both Yuugen and NOCO collaborated to create an illustration with the other series' artists, which was displayed at a panel discussion celebrating the 25th anniversaries of the Atelier and Tales of series. Later, DLC costumes based on the other series could be purchased for the playable characters of Atelier Sophie 2 to wear. Likewise, the other games featured costumes based on Atelier Sophie 2.

Atelier Sophie 2 released on February 25, 2022. In Japan, it sold 41,016 physical copies through the 27th. The PlayStation 4 and Nintendo Switch versions ranked 4th and 5th in overall sales that week, behind Pokémon Legends: Arceus and two versions of Elden Ring. In its second week, it placed 22nd and 26th with 5,206 additional sales between the versions. Its final appearance on that chart was the next week, when the Switch version sold an additional 1,634 units and placed 29th.

DLC came out in waves in the months following release. Most of it is cosmetic content such as in-game clothing, such as the cross-promotion with Tales of Arise and Blue Reflection: Second Light in costumes and areas mentioned above. There is also an extra scenario depicting Plachta's arrival in Erde Wiege.

== Reception ==
Reception

Aggregate scores
Aggregator	Score
Metacritic	NS: 80/100; PC: 83/100; PS4: 82/100
OpenCritic	82% recommend

Review scores
Publication	Score
Destructoid	8/10
HobbyConsolas	80/100
MeriStation	8.5/10
Nintendo Life	8/10
Nintendo World Report	8/10
Push Square	8/10
RPGamer	4.5/5
RPGFan	90/100
The Games Machine (Italy)	7.1/10
TouchArcade	4/5

Atelier Sophie 2: The Alchemist of the Mysterious Dream received "generally favorable" reviews according to review aggregator Metacritic. Fellow review aggregator OpenCritic assessed that the game received strong approval, being recommended by 82% of critics.

Des Miler of RPGFan scored the game highly, writing that the plot, music, dungeon design, and characters were all excellent, with his only complaint that the pacing was off in parts. Jenny Jones of Push Square also gave the game a positive review, writing it was an improvement on the previous game. She praised the story and characters, although felt that some of the side quests were a tad repetitive. Jenni Lada of Siliconera gave a more measured review, stating that the game's focus on Sophie, Plachta, and their relationship would potentially leave players who hadn't played the original Atelier Sophie, or who were less invested in those characters, left out.
