= Atelier Ayesha: The Alchemist of Dusk =

2012 video game

- Developer: Gust Co. Ltd.
- Publishers: JP: Gust Co. Ltd.; WW: Koei Tecmo
- Director: Yoshito Okamura
- Producer: Tadanobu Inoue
- Designer: Azusa Takahashi
- Programmer: Yuji Higuchi
- Artist: Hidari
- Composers: Daisuke Achiwa; Kazuki Yanagawa; Yu Shimoda
- Series: Atelier
- Engine: PhyreEngine
- Platforms: PlayStation 3, PlayStation Vita, PlayStation 4, Nintendo Switch, Microsoft Windows
- Release: June 28, 2012: Atelier Ayesha PlayStation 3; JP: June 28, 2012; NA: March 5, 2013; AU: March 7, 2013; EU: March 8, 2013 Atelier Ayesha Plus PlayStation Vita; JP: March 27, 2014; NA: January 13, 2015; PAL: February 11, 2015 Atelier Ayesha DX Nintendo Switch & PlayStation 4; JP: December 25, 2019; EU: January 14, 2020; NA: January 14, 2020 Microsoft Windows; WW: January 14, 2020
- Genre: Role-playing
- Mode: Single-player

Atelier Ayesha: The Alchemist of Dusk (Note: Japanese: アーシャのアトリエ ～黄昏の大地の錬金術士～, Hepburn: Asha no Atorie ~Tasogare no Daichi no Renkinjutsushi~; lit. Atelier Ayesha ~Alchemist of the Land of Dusk~) is a Japanese role-playing video game developed by Gust Co. Ltd. The character designs are by Hidari. It is the fourteenth title in the Atelier series, coming after Atelier Meruru, but has a storyline independent from previous titles in the series. The game is the first installment in the Dusk storyline. An English language release was published in March 2013 by Tecmo Koei in western regions. A PlayStation Vita version titled Atelier Ayesha Plus: The Alchemist of Dusk (Note: Japanese: アーシャのアトリエPlus ～黄昏の大地の錬金術士～) was released on March 27, 2014 in Japan, January 13, 2015 in North America and January 14, 2015 in Europe. There is also a drama CD and novel based on the game.

A port of the game titled Atelier Ayesha DX for Nintendo Switch and PlayStation 4 was released on December 25, 2019 in Japan, and on January 14, 2020 in the West along with an additional Microsoft Windows release worldwide.

== Gameplay ==
The game proceeds through that the player completes objectives through harvesting items, combat, or fusing items together. Objectives are given as the game's story proceeds. There is, however, no systematic objectives, and the only goal is to reunite Ayesha with her sister Nio again within a given time frame of three in-game years with time advancing while travelling on the map. Instead, the player will have to find out answers by making their own choices and in so doing, continue the story.

Combat commences when the player character comes in contact with an enemy. The battle system is turn-based and the fastest of the participating characters will receive the first turn. The distance between the player's characters and the enemies has an effect on the battle. The game's main character, Ayesha, is the only character in the game who can use items in battle, which is the main element in the game's battle system. The party of characters can support each other by performing actions such as defending or attacking, and characters that are close to each other can support each other with attacks. There are also skills and items that are effective within a certain range. When an enemy is attacked from behind, a ”Back Attack” occurs, which will make the attack into a critical hit.

The player is able to write in a diary by using points obtained from completing objectives. The diary allows the player to look back on the story so far, as well as obtain bonus rewards.

As the player travels on the map to reach main story quests or to reach locations where certain ingredients are needed for alchemy, temporary side quests, cutscenes, or character specific interactions can be encountered if the player chooses.

== Premise ==
Atelier Ayesha stars Ayesha Altugle, who runs an herbalist's workshop with her sister Nio. After Nio disappears mysteriously, Ayesha meets an alchemist called Keithgriff Hazeldine, who reveals that she must master the art of alchemy herself in order to rescue her sister, but she has only a few years to do so, or Nio will eventually be lost forever. Overcoming sadness is one of the game's themes and players will see Ayesha grow as she writes diary entries, while she gathers allies and improves her alchemy skills in her quest to reunite with her missing sister.

Atelier Ayesha takes place in a new world separate from the Arland saga where the art of alchemy used to thrive in the past, but now only a few know about its secrets.

== Characters ==
Ayesha Altugle (アーシャ・アルトゥール, Āsha Arutūru)
The protagonist of the game. Ayesha is an herbalist who ran a small workshop with her grandfather and little sister Nio until her grandfather died and Nio goes missing. Despite being left alone, Ayesha remained upbeat and continued to run the workshop. One day, Ayesha sees an apparition of Nio by her supposed grave. Convinced that her little sister is still alive, Ayesha sets off on a journey to discover the means to save her. The knowledge of alchemy has been passed down in her family, but she does not recognize herself as an alchemist.

Nio Altugle (ニオ・アルトゥール, Nio Arutūru)
Ayesha's younger sister who disappears one day while out gathering herbs. After a long search by Ayesha and nearby villagers found no trace of the girl, she is assumed dead, and a gravestone is erected at the place of her disappearance. The truth is that she has been captured by an alchemy creation that has gone out of control and she is reunited with Ayesha after a battle against Yggdrasil.

Keithgriff Hazeldine (キースグリフ・ヘーゼルダイン, Kīsugurifu Hēzerudain)
An experienced alchemist from another country with keen interest in ancient times. He is a calm and collected gentleman in pursuit of knowledge. Keithgriff first encounters Ayesha on one of his visits to an ancient ruin and points the young girl towards alchemy as the key to saving her younger sister. In battle, Keithgriff does not use a weapon, instead relying on alchemy related attacks, which he summons from his magic ring. He is on a journey to rectify the wrongdoings of alchemists before him and to pursue the ultimate truth, though he is considered a criminal in his native country after having destroyed various facilities and documents. He fights Ayesha over a flask found in a village that all inhabitants have disappeared from, but he is valuable to Ayesha, though that he is not aware of it himself that he has come to help her.

Regina Kurtis (レジナ・カティス, Rejina Katisu)
An acquaintance of Ayesha who makes her living selling artifacts excavated from ruins. Despite being a woman, she is considered one of the strongest amongst the prospectors, a group consisting mainly of heavily built men in their prime. Regina is a sociable and reliable girl with a bunch of younger siblings to take care of.

Wilbell Voll-Ersleid (ウィルベル・ヴォル エルスリート, Uiruberu Boru Erusurīto)
A girl who comes from a family of witches. Described as being cute and wearing a black pointy hat, Wilbell is a genius when it comes to magic, but knows that she is a long way to be acknowledged by her great-great-grandmother, to whom she looks up. Despite fighting with a broom, Wilbell is still learning to fly as a proper witch. To prove herself to her great-great-grandmother, she attempts one of the ultimate goals of the sorcerers and challenges the Wind Ruler. The Wind Ruler grants her powers after witnessing her protecting Ayesha.

Linca (リンカ, Rinka)
A calm and collected swordswoman that acts as Marion Quinn' bodyguard. By Marion's request, she offers her assistance to Ayesha, who in return helps in her efforts to improve her cooking and make other friends, with dubious results. She used to be a criminal, but she was captured and then saved by Marion. There exist at least seven others with the same appearance as Linca, as well as whom all possess the same name. Their personalities are however different.

Juris Gruden (ユーリス・グルンデン, Yūrisu Gurinden)
A hunter who wants to defeat a dragon and wear its scales as armor. Despite his stoic demeanor, he is very protective of his sister Nanaca, and watches over her from afar as she looks for pasture for their cows. Juris fights using a hatchet and crossbow.

Marion Quinn (マリオン・クィン)
An office worker from a large faraway city in a western country. Marion is tasked with gathering information about the area. She is small in size, but firm, and loves cute things. She captured Linca in the past, and Linca now serves as her bodyguard. She is also looking for Keithgriff, who committed crimes in their home country. When she realizes how important he is to Ayesha and his thoughts, she decides to let him go free. Her name is romanized as Marion Quin in the Japanese-language version of the game.

Odelia (オディーリア)
An automaton constructed with alchemy. She is the librarian of a library that collects information about alchemy. She cannot express feelings very strongly, and her memory has begun to get worse. She searches for a book for Ayesha in the library's collection, and she begins to become more human-like in her behavior by interacting with Ayesha. She is the guardian of knowledge and complements to the guardian of life, Yggdrasil. After her new master Keithgriff orders her to no longer follow orders, she proposes to come along with him on the journey he is about to set out on. Her name is romanized as Odileia in the Japanese-language version of the game.

Harry Olson (ハリー・オルソン)
The manager of a company with great influence. He holds a great interest about the ancient times and collects relics that others may view as trash.

Yggdrasil
The guardian of life who was made through ancient alchemy. He complements Odelia, the guardian of knowledge.

Wind Ruler (風の王)
The regent of the wind spirits.

Marietta Muir (メリエッタ・ミューア)
An enthusiastic clerk who workes in a shop owned by Harry. She manages the shop by herself since Harry is busy with his personal interests. Her name is romanized as Merietta Muir in the Japanese-language version of the game.

Ranun Etts (ラナン・エッツ)
A traveler with no employment. He is devoted to creating art by playing music on his bagpipes.

Nanaca Gruden (ナナカ・グルンデン)
A nomad who, according to her family's customs, keeps cows and travels in search of pastures. She is Juris's younger sister.

Ernie Lyttleton (アーニー・リトルトン)
A traveling salesman who is like a parental figure to Ayesha.

Tanya Volta (ターニャ・フォルタ)
A girl who mines salt together with her family in a desert.

Fred Rodfork (フレッド・ロッドフォーク)
A bread-obsessed baker who has set up shop in Vierzeberg. He has a crush on Marietta, and changes moods drastically when she is around.

Kyle Tarenbert (カイル・タレンバート)
A barkeeper in Hornheim. He behaves in a very laid-back manner towards his customers and even rents out the room next to his tavern to Ayesha for use in alchemy.

== Atelier Ayesha Plus ==
Atelier Ayesha Plus: The Alchemist of Dusk (アーシャのアトリエPlus ～黄昏の大地の錬金術士～) is a PlayStation Vita port of the game with additional content. It was released in Japan on March 27, 2014. This port includes almost all downloadable content that is available for the PlayStation 3 version of the game, such as costumes and characters, as well as new content, such as a harder difficulty to play the game in, new enemies and costumes and the ability to change the members of the party at any time.

== Reception ==
Reception

Aggregate score
| Aggregator | Score |
|---|---|
| Metacritic | PS3: 70/100; VITA: 76/100; NS: 66/100 |

Review scores
| Publication | Score |
|---|---|
| Electronic Gaming Monthly | 7.5/10 |
| Famitsu | PS3: 34/40; VITA: 31/40 |
| IGN | 6.2/10 |
| RPGFan | PS3: 4/5; Vita: 3.5/5 |

The PS3 version of the game received a Famitsu review score of 34/40, whilst the PS Vita version attained a score of 31/40.

== Media ==
=== Novel ===
A novel by the name アーシャのアトリエ～ある錬金術士の旅の日記より～ was released on March 26, 2013. The novel details events that was not included in the game, in the form of eight short stories. The novel was written by Toru Shizuki, illustrated by Hiroki Haruse, and published by Koei Tecmo.

=== World Guide CD ===
A CD narrated by Marina Inoue and Mariya Ise was bundled with pre-orders of the PlayStation 3 game in Japan. It is called the World Guide CD(ワールドガイドCD). It contained explanations of the setting of the story and there were six different designs available for the records' surface.
