= Atelier Sophie: The Alchemist of the Mysterious Book =

2015 video game

- Developer: Gust
- Publisher: Koei Tecmo
- Director: Yoshito Okamura
- Producer: Tadanobu Inoue
- Designer: Yoshito Okamura
- Artists: Yuugen, Noco
- Composers: Ryudai Abe; Daisuke Achiwa; Hayato Asano; Kazuki Yanagawa; Tatsuya Yano
- Series: Atelier
- Platforms: PlayStation 3; PlayStation 4; PlayStation Vita; Microsoft Windows; Nintendo Switch
- Release: PlayStation 3: JP: November 19, 2015; PlayStation 4, PS Vita: JP: November 19, 2015; NA: June 7, 2016; PAL: June 10, 2016; Microsoft Windows: WW: February 7, 2017; Nintendo Switch: WW: April 22, 2021
- Genre: Role-playing
- Mode: Single-player

Atelier Sophie: The Alchemist of the Mysterious Book (Note: Japanese: ソフィーのアトリエ～不思議な本の錬金術士～, Hepburn: Sofī no Atorie ~ Fushigi na Hon no Renkinjutsushi ~) is a 2015 Japanese role-playing video game developed by Gust and published by Koei Tecmo for the PlayStation 3 (only in Japan), PlayStation 4, PlayStation Vita (digital-only) and Microsoft Windows. It is the 17th main game in the Atelier series and the first game of the Mysterious storyline, as well as the debut of Koei Tecmo taking over publishing rights for Western regions in place of NIS America. The enhanced version of the game titled Atelier Sophie: The Alchemist of the Mysterious Book DX (Note: Japanese: ソフィーのアトリエ ～不思議な本の錬金術士～ DX, Hepburn: Sofī no Atorie ~Fushigi na Hon no Renkinjutsushi~ DX) was released for PlayStation 4, Windows, and the Nintendo Switch on April 22, 2021.

A sequel, Atelier Sophie 2: The Alchemist of the Mysterious Dream released on Nintendo Switch, PlayStation 4, and Windows on February 25, 2022.

== Gameplay ==
The game features a completely reformed worldview from earlier titles within the series, in addition to a new alchemy-centric system. Sophie is able to obtain ideas for recipes from activities such as harvesting, exploring, battling, or from events, and these ideas are used as a basis of improving her knowledge of alchemy. When she performs alchemy, the player is presented with various predetermined shapes representing the ingredients used, and arranges each shape on a puzzle board that represents the cauldron. This process involves visual trial-and-error, and if the shapes are arranged perfectly, the player receives a bonus. The materials selected affect the quality of the item synthesised. This system is intended to offer a high degree of freedom based on the player's own playstyle.

Once the player gathers the required ingredients, the alchemy process involves a five-step process which consists of selecting a cauldron, applying ingredients, arranging shapes to receive bonuses, reviewing the bonuses acquired, and finally selecting which bonuses the player intends to keep. After crafting, the player is able to progress the story, in addition to equipping up to four categories of items using the "Dollmake" feature.

The "Dollmake" feature allows the player to freely customise Plachta using costume items crafted by the player via alchemy. As the number of items crafted via alchemy increases, the possible customisation options widen. The game's new weather system affects how the game world changes based on the current time and weather; for example, items receive shop discounts and specific types of enemies appear at certain times and under certain conditions.

== Plot ==
The game is set in the small town of Kirchen Bell, a location with a warm atmosphere and occasional rainfall, during the dawning era of alchemy prior to it becoming a widespread art. Within the outskirts lies an atelier studio run solely by a girl named Sophie, who has a mysterious power that allows her to combine items together to form entirely different items. Without a mentor or reference guide to teach her, her alchemy attempts repeatedly fail time and time again. One day, however, she comes across a mysterious book that moves and talks by its own free will. Sophie's goal is to restore the book's memories and its former human form.

=== Characters ===
Sophie Neuenmuller
The protagonist of the game, who is an alchemist that runs her own atelier studio. Although she is popular and bright, she is also sloppy and is terrible at housework.

Plachta
A silver-haired girl with amnesia, who is originally an old book from the atelier's bookshelf. Plachta teaches Sophie alchemy, and as more recipes are written within her, she regains her memories. The player can customise her appearance via synthesised costumes using the game's "Dollmake" feature.

Oskar Behlmer
A greengrocer's son who has a passion for plants. Although he is lazy and physically unfit, he has an optimistic personality and the unusual ability to hear the voices of plants. He is also knowledgeable about grass and flowers.

Monika Ellmenreich
A talented woman born to a well-respected family who excels at swordsmanship and her studies. As Sophie's childhood friend, she often looks after her and scolds her. She has a serious personality and prioritises politeness, though she enjoys singing.

Corneria
An alchemist girl who works as a volume seller, and has the special ability of being able to replicate things, at the expense of shrinking her own body size.

Harol Siemens
A clocksmith who prefers making guns over repairing watches. He has a sarcastic personality.

Horst Basler
An old man in charge of the Kirhen Bell café, which operates as a bar in the evening. He is responsible for brokering requests, and shares information with Sophie.

Leon
A tailor who fights with a spear and uses jamming items.

Julio Sebald Leidenschaft
A young knight from the country of Adarett studying alchemy.

Fritz Weissberg
A former mercenary who now performs puppet shows during his travels as a doll-maker. He uses dual swords in combat.

Meklet (メクレット)
A young boy with an interest in alchemy who can see into the true nature of things.

Atomina
A young girl who is often silent. She accompanies Meklet.

Tess Heitzmann
The simple-minded and troublesome showgirl for the Kirchen Bell café.

Logix "Logy" Fiscario
A blacksmith who provides assistance to Sophie by crafting equipment for the party, he is based on a character of the same name from the Dusk series.

== Development ==
The game was first announced to the public through pre-publication previews of Weekly Famitsu and within the 593rd volume of Dengeki PlayStation, and is directed by series director Yoshito Okamura. Prior to the game's official reveal, trademarks for the names "ソフィーのアトリエ" and "不思議な本の錬金術士" had been filed by Koei Tecmo on May 20, 2015. The character designs are illustrated by Yuugen, an illustrator from Chiba Prefecture who has prior worked on Bravely Default, alongside Noco from Saitama Prefecture who has previously illustrated for KanColle: Kagerou, Setting Sail!.

Yoshito Okamura states that the choice of experimenting with two illustrators aims at creating a mysterious image for the game's setting and allows people with different artistic directions to design different characters which provides greater significance to the character designs. This is the first game in the series to use multiple artists. Musicians involved in production for the game's opening, ending and insert songs include Rurutia, Ami, Haruka Shimotsuki, Tsukiko, Okazaki Anna, and TynwaldMusic. The game, along with the other initial Social Gust game, Nights of Azure, experienced delays in release, with Atelier Sophie's delay being graphics quality enhancement.

== Reception ==
Reception

Aggregate score
Aggregator	Score
Metacritic	PS4: 75/100; PC: 73/100

Review scores
Publication	Score
4Players	PS4: 60/100
Famitsu	33/40
Game Informer	8/10
GameRevolution	PS4: 7/10
Hardcore Gamer	PS4: 3.5/5
Push Square	PS4: 5/10
RPGamer	PS4: 3.0/5; PC: 2.0/5
RPGFan	PS4: 80/100; DX: 82/100
The Games Machine (Italy)	PS4: 7/10

Atelier Sophie: The Alchemist of the Mysterious Book received "generally favorable" reviews for the PlayStation 4 version according to review aggregator Metacritic; the Windows version received "mixed or average" reviews.

The game received a Famitsu review score of 33/40 across all platforms. The game sold a total of 68,106 physical retail copies across all three console platforms within the first week of release in Japan. Koei Tecmo stated the game to have sold 170,000 units in Japan/Asia alone in their late 2016 report. The game had shipped 400,000 copies by 2021.
