= Atelier Firis: The Alchemist and the Mysterious Journey =

2016 video game

- Developer: Gust
- Publisher: Koei Tecmo
- Director: Shinichi Yoshiike
- Producers: Hisashi Koinuma; Tadanobu Inoue; Yoshito Okamura
- Artists: Yuugen, NOCO
- Composers: Kazuki Yanagawa; Daisuke Achiwa; Tatsuya Yano
- Series: Atelier
- Platforms: PlayStation Vita; PlayStation 4; Microsoft Windows; Nintendo Switch
- Release: PlayStation 4, PS Vita: JP: November 2, 2016; NA: March 7, 2017; EU: March 10, 2017; Microsoft Windows: WW: March 7, 2017; Nintendo Switch: WW: April 22, 2021
- Genre: Role-playing
- Mode: Single-player

Atelier Firis: The Alchemist and the Mysterious Journey (Note: Japanese: フィリスのアトリエ ~不思議な旅の錬金術士~, Hepburn: Firisu no Atorie ~Fushigi na Tabi no Renkinjutsushi~) is a 2016 Japanese role-playing video game developed by Gust for the PlayStation 4, PlayStation Vita, and Microsoft Windows. It is the eighteenth main game in the Atelier series and the second game of the Mysterious storyline. It was released on North America and Europe on March 10, 2017, the following year. The enhanced version of the game titled Atelier Firis: The Alchemist and the Mysterious Journey DX (Note: Japanese: フィリスのアトリエ ～不思議な旅の錬金術士～ DX, Hepburn: Firisu no Atorie ~Fushigi na Tabi no Renkinjutsushi~ DX) was released for PlayStation 4, Windows, and the Nintendo Switch on April 22, 2021.

== Gameplay ==
Atelier Firis is a role-playing game with a time management aspect. Players can perform actions such as exploration, combat, and item synthesis as they wish, although this causes the in-game calendar to advance, similar to some earlier Atelier games. Players are expected to finish the main quest of passing an alchemist certification exam within a year, with the rest of the game not limited by in-game time. As time passes day and night will cycle. It is the first game in the Atelier series to feature an open world.

The item synthesis system allows the player to place items of different sizes into a square panel, which players place items of differing shapes into. These panels have lines that appear on them; covering all the lines grants bonuses. Catalysts are used to change the size of the panel and add new lines, and thus new bonuses. The usage of catalysts can result in greatly different versions of the same item. There is, additionally, mass synthesis, or the ability to create items that change the fields themselves.

Item synthesis is not bound to a single location. Instead, it can be performed at any campfire found in the land, using a portable atelier. This atelier can be decorated, and with some of the decorations offering special effects. Further, recipes for synthesis can be found from all kinds of activities, such as fighting, meeting characters, gathering materials, and the act of synthesis itself. Items can be gathered through multiple methods. For instance, a rock can be broken with Firis's staff, or it can be blown up with an item, which may result in different materials.

Four characters can be taken into battle. Item effects and monster actions and abilities may change by the weather and time of day. Depending on the character's selected action, their wait time for their next turn may change. Attacking enemies repeatedly can inflict them with "break", which makes them unable to move. They can be left stunned until they recover, or they can then be attacked for greater damage. As the characters perform actions, a gauge fills, allowing characters to use "chain burst" activities when full. Any characters that move consecutively can use a combination attack together. Depending on the gauge and number of characters attacking together, chained skills can be used. Using these skills increases the "linkage" rate, which allows the use of finishing attacks once it reaches a certain value. All characters are capable of using items; however, only alchemists can use all items.

== Plot ==
Firis Mistlud is a young girl living in the secluded mine town of Ertona who dreams of exploring the world outside. One day, Firis becomes friends with Sophie and Plachta, the main characters of the previous game, who teach her the basics of alchemy. After proving her talent for alchemy, Firis is allowed to leave the village, accompanied by her sister Liane, but under the condition that she must pass the alchemist certification exam in one year, or she will be forced to return home.

After leaving Ertona, Firis is tasked to meet at least one certified alchemist and earn their recommendation letter which qualifies her for the alchemist certification exam, which is held in the town of Reisemberg. Should Firis fails to take the exam in one year or fails the exam itself, it triggers the game's bad ending, with Firis forced to give up on her dream of traveling around the world and returning to Ertona. Otherwise, the game continues with multiple possible endings, depending on the path the player takes as they keep exploring the map and interacting with other characters.

== Characters ==
Firis Mistlud (フィリス・ミストルート, Firisu Misutorūto)
A young girl from the secluded mining town of Ertona, she is drawn to the world of alchemy upon meeting Sophie and Plachta. She is eager to travel the world and finds a chance when is allowed to study for the alchemy certification exam.

Liane Mistlud (リアーネ・ミストルート, Riāne Misutorūto)
Firis' older sister who loves to dote on her. She is an archer who accompanies Firis in her travels.

Sophie Neuenmuller (ソフィー・ノイエンミュラー, Sofī Noienmyurā)
The protagonist of the previous game, she becomes Firis' teacher and inspires her to become an alchemist.

Plachta (プラフタ, Purafuta)
Sophie's friend and teacher in alchemy who travels with her.

Revy Berger (レヴィ・ベルガー, Revi Berugā)
A wandering swordsman seeking to become stronger, and becomes one of Firis' traveling companions.

Ilmeria Von Leinweber (イルメリア・フォン・ラインウェバー, Irumeria Fon Rainuebā)
Daughter of a famous alchemist, she becomes Firis' close friend and rival.

Oskar Behlmer (オスカー・ベールマー, Osukā Bērumā)
Another character returning from Atelier Sophie, he can hear the voices of plants, and now sports a more mature demeanor and fit complexion.

Drossel Weissberg (ドロッセル・ワイスベルク, Dorosseru Waisuberuku)
A warrior and puppeteer who travels in search for her mother, she is the daughter of Fritz Weissberg from the previous game.

Kald Lau (カルド・ラオ, Karudo Rao)

Angriff Dahlmann

Shanon Atkins

Heintz Freihorn (ハインツ・フライホルン, Haintsu Furaihorun)

== Reception ==
Reception

Aggregate score
Aggregator	Score
Metacritic	PS4: 74/100

Review scores
Publication	Score
Computer Games Magazine	5.5/10
Hardcore Gamer	3/5
Push Square	7/10
RPGamer	2.5/5
RPGFan	(DX) 70/100

The game received a Famitsu review score of 34/40 across all platforms. The PlayStation Vita version of Atelier Firis: The Alchemist and the Mysterious Journey debuted at number five of the Japanese video game sales charts, with 16,153 copies sold and PC steam ver has sold in total 23,151 Digital copies based on information from the steamspy count.
