= Atelier Lulua: The Scion of Arland =

2019 video game

- PAL cover art featuring Lulua and Rorona
- Developer: Gust
- Publisher: Koei Tecmo
- Producers: Junzo Hosoi; Keisuke Kikuchi
- Designer: Shinichi Abiko
- Artist: Mel Kishida
- Writer: Yuya Jin
- Composers: Kazuki Yanagawa; Ken Nakagawa; Daisuke Achiwa
- Series: Atelier
- Platforms: PlayStation 4 Nintendo Switch; Windows
- Release: PS4, Switch: JP: March 20, 2019; NA: May 21, 2019; EU: May 24, 2019; Windows: NA/JP: May 21, 2019; EU: May 24, 2019
- Genre: Role-playing
- Mode: Single-player

Atelier Lulua: The Scion of Arland (Note: Japanese: ルルアのアトリエ ～アーランドの錬金術士4～, Hepburn: Rurua no Atorie ~Ārando no Renkinjutsushi 4~; lit. Atelier Lulua: The Alchemist of Arland 4) is a 2019 role-playing video game developed by Gust and published by Koei Tecmo for PlayStation 4, Nintendo Switch and Windows. It is part of the Atelier series, and the fourth entry in the Arland subseries. Following trainee alchemist Lulua Frixell as she goes on a journey following the discovery of a magical book called the Alchemyriddle, gameplay features exploration and battles using turn-based combat, and alchemic synthesising for items and quest objectives.

Production began in 2017 led by producer Junzo Hosoi and illustrator Mel Kishida. The team wanted a title celebrating the tenth anniversary of the Arland series and 25th anniversary of Gust. Developed alongside Atelier Ryza, the team described the game as a refinement of current gameplay systems. The staff included multiple Arland veterans including co-composers Kazuki Yanagawa, Ken Nakagawa and Daisuke Achiwa. Japanese and Western journalists gave praise to its gameplay systems and the Alchemyriddle mechanics, but were mixed on its story and graphics.

== Gameplay ==
A battle in Atelier Lulua: The Scion of Arland

Atelier Lulua: The Scion of Arland is a role-playing video game in which players take on the role of trainee alchemist Lulua Frixell. The game is divided between synthesising items with alchemy, exploration of town and field environments, and engaging in combat with enemy monsters. Beginning with her home town of Arklys, Lulua explores different regions of Arland separated into zones accessed through a world map which expands as the story progresses. In contrast to earlier Atelier titles, there is no time limit in place. While in town areas, Lulua can use her workshop for alchemy, buy and sell items and equipment at shops, and complete quests linked to either the main narrative or side objectives from party members and non-playable characters. Quests are split into synthesising an item or killing a particular monster, with only five side quests able to be active at a time.

While exploring field environments, Lulua can gather materials from glowing harvest points. Some points need a special tool to harvest with, such as a rod for fishing or a net to catch insects. Enemies roam these environments, with combat initiated by running into them, and actions displayed on a timeline above the battle screen. The party can use standard attacks, unique skills, alchemist characters using an item, defending, switching party members mid-battle, and in some cases fleeing. Combat is turn-based, with three active characters and two support characters who can be triggered for additional attacks. Under certain conditions, alchemists can use an "Interrupt" to break turn order and use an item to damage the enemy or support the party. The battle ends when either side runs out of health.

Alchemy primarily focuses around creating items ranging from those used in combat, accessories, clothing items, food, and plot or quest items. Alchemy ingredients are displayed on a grid, with the player adding them to a recipe. Each ingredient has different traits such as elemental properties which impact the final result of the synthesis. Some items can only be synthesised after other items have been created through alchemy. There is also a chance of an "Awakening", granting new traits to an item. Alchemy-based goals are tied to the Alchemyriddle, a plot-relevant book which is unlocked by progressing the story and meeting in-game requirements. The book provides hints for completing the requirements, which include combat and exploration.

== Synopsis ==
Set many years after the events of Atelier Meruru in the Arland Republic, Elmerulia "Lulua" Frixell−adopted daughter of famed alchemist Rorona Frixell−is studying under the alchemist Piana in the town of Arklys. One day while Rorona has left on an errand, a book called the Alchemyriddle falls from the sky onto Lulua's head. While everyone else sees the book as blank, Lulua can read advanced alchemic instructions in it which expand as she explores and gains experience. She decides to go on a journey of learning with some of her allies, which takes her through ruins created by an ancient people; Arland's current alchemy was derived from discoveries within the ruins, which are also tied to a growing instability in Arland's land. During the journey, Lulua is joined by Rorona and befriends a young girl called Stia. Stia is revealed to be one of the Operators, artificial beings that maintain the ruins.

During her journey, it is discovered that the ruins' technology is slowly failing, including the great ruin of Fellegalaxan; its failure will cause Arland, which is built on top of it, to collapse. Stia regains the power she needs to restore Fellegalaxan, but it will come at the cost of her human form. The Alchemyriddle is revealed to have been sent from a parallel timeline by another Lulua who failed to save Stia from this fate. Multiple endings are unlocked based on the quests completed and Lulua's relationships with different people. One ending has Lulua failing to save Stia and sending the Alchemyriddle to another version of herself, continuing the cycle. In the best ending, Lulua saves Stia while stabilising the ruins, synthesizing items to save the alternate versions of Stia and Arland.

== Development ==
Atelier Lulua was developed by the Nagano Development Department of series creator Gust. Planning for the game began in December 2017 following a series festival. Producer Junzo Hosoi stated he had long wanted to create a fourth Arland title along with illustrator Mel Kishida. The two had recently collaborated on the RPG Blue Reflection. The game was intended to celebrate both the tenth anniversary of the Arland trilogy, and Gust's 25th anniversary. Hosoi co-produced the game with Keisuke Kikuchi. Production ran parallel with the next mainline entry Atelier Ryza (2019). While Atelier Ryza was intended to be an evolution of the series, Atelier Lulua was described as a refinement of the older gameplay design. Production was described as "smooth". The music and writing staff included people who had worked on all the previous Arland titles. The gameplay systems were intended to combine and refine design elements from the previous Arland titles, along with incorporating elements from later subseries. The Alchemyriddle went through multiple versions before the final build, with the focus being on balancing its design. The alchemy system was simpler to design, with the team balancing different elements they wanted to include from across the series. The battle system was a refined version of that used in Atelier Lydie & Suelle (2017).

Eva's design was finalized quickly, while Lulua's design process was prolonged by how much of Eva and Rorona's designs to incorporate. Kishida decided not to give a hat to Lulua in contrast with earlier Arland protagonists, and ended up in a standoff with Hosoi over incorporating a hair ornament. Lulua's final design blended established fantasy elements with a jacket using modern military uniform design, referencing the changing state of the Arland world. A design with a hoodie was rejected due to complaints from the 3D modeling team. Kishida also went against the production team's expectations for the pirate Nico to be "a more bitter and passionate character", creating a cool design to match the rest of the male cast. Due to the increased hardware power of the PlayStation 4 and Nintendo Switch, the team were able to accurately recreate Kishida's designs as 3D models. An important element for the team was creating emotive facial expressions and character models, drawing on their experience with Blue Reflection. The animated opening was created by LandQ Studios, who had previously worked on the Mysterious series.

The main story and scenario was written by Yuya Jin. Hosoi described the scenario as a collaborative effort between himself, Jin and the game's director. After talking over with Kishida, Hosoi decided to make Atelier Lulua a sequel, as they had previously created a prequel scenario for a remake of Atelier Rorona. The story's theme was "Inheritance", represented by Lulua's status as Rorona's daughter. While a sequel, the team also designed the game to be accessible to series newcomers. Lulua's personality was hard to balance, as the team wanted her to stand out for both newcomers and veterans. The tone was more overtly comical with manga-inspired expressions and actions included in cutscenes. Previous Atelier subseries had principally been trilogies, with Hosoi saying it was a challenge showing character growth across four games in the same continuity. When talking about the character growth, Hosoi compared it to the Star Wars film series and drew inspiration for his approach to Atelier Lulua from Star Wars: The Force Awakens.

The soundtrack was co-composed by Kazuki Yanagawa, Ken Nakagawa and Daisuke Achiwa, who had each worked on a different entry in the Arland series. It was the first time the three composers had worked together on the same project. They acted as both composers and arrangers, along with arranging new versions of earlier tracks including an arrangement of Miyoko Kobayashi's theme for the ghost girl Paula. The opening theme "Presa" was composed and written by Yanagawa and sung by Mineko Yamamoto, who had sung all previous Arland opening themes. Both were pleased to be returning to the Arland series. The ending theme "Tabi e Yosete" was composed by Nakagawa and performed by singer Kayoco. The lyrics were written by Kanai Aoki. Nakagawa wrote the song before a singer had been chosen for it. Kayoco was a newcomer to the Atelier series, and recorded the song without reference to a demo version. Chorus work was done by Yamamoto and Yuka.

== Release ==
The game was first announced in Japan in October 2018 through an issue of gaming magazine Famitsu, with a Western release confirmed shortly afterward for PS4, Switch and Windows via Steam. One of Kishida's promotional illustrations, featuring both Lulua and Rorona, went unreleased for years to focus marketing attention on Lulua. Atelier Lulua released in Japan on March 20, 2019, and in North America and Europe on May 21 and May 24 respectively. The Windows version released in Japan on May 21. Downloadable content was released between June and July 2019 featuring new outfits for the cast, and adding Totori and Rorona as playable characters. A soundtrack album was released alongside the game in Japan, a strategy guide was published on April 27, and an artbook was released on June 28.

== Reception ==
Reception

Aggregate score
Aggregator	Score
Metacritic	PS4: 78/100; NS: 78/100; PC: 79/100

Review scores
Publication	Score
Famitsu	8/10, 8/10, 8/10, 8/10
Nintendo Life	8/10
RPGamer	4/5
RPGFan	70%
RPG Site	9/10

During its first week on sale in Japan, Atelier Lulua sold a total of over 40,000 copies across PS4 and Switch, with the versions ranking respectively at #5 and #13 in Media Create's top twenty best-selling titles. The game received positive reviews from critics. Review aggregator website Metacritic gave a score of 78 out of 100 for the console versions, based on 22 reviews of the PS4 version and 12 of the Switch version; and 79 for the Windows version, based on 4 reviews.

When mentioning the narrative, reviewers for Famitsu praised the new characters, and Shinichi Yamoto of 4Gamer.net described the story as something players did not need to worry about when playing. RPG Site's positively noted the wider mysteries of Arland and callbacks to earlier games while still focusing on Lulua's journey, while RPGFan's Derek Heemsbergen faulted a lack of risks or surprises in the game. Mitch Vogel of Nintendo Life said the story was "admittedly not the strongest aspect" of the game due to uneven writing, but enjoyed the lighter narrative tone and humor.

Speaking about the graphics, reviewers for Famitsu gave overall praise, though one reviewer found the character model movements stiff during cutscenes. Yamoto lauded the accurate transition of Kishida's artstyle into the 3D models, while Matt Masem of RPGamer praised the visual design while echoing issues with character movements in cutscenes. Vogel praised the graphics as fitting with the game's tone and style, and enjoyed the soundtrack despite it not being particularly memorable. Heemsbergen disliked the character designs, feeling they had become generic in style compared to earlier Arland titles, and faulted both the technical performance and the music.

The gameplay and synthesis systems were lauded by Famitsu as enjoyable, though one reviewer noted a lack of new elements in alchemy synthesis. Yamoto enjoyed the synthesis gameplay and praised the speed of combat, while Masem praised the battle system as the best in the series and strengthened by how alchemy tied into its mechanics. Vogel described the synthesis and combat gameplay as good examples from the Atelier series as a whole. Heemsbergen lauded the game's take on alchemy while noting the combat lacked any innovation, and Henges noted balancing issues with some of the combat mechanics. Several Western reviewers also felt the alchemy elements became cumbersome due to lack of explanation and depth of mechanics. Multiple reviewers praised the reworked progression system around the Alchemyriddle as offering a different kind of engagement to previous time management.
