= Mel Kishida =

Japanese illustrator

- 岸田 メル
- Born: Hajime Kishira (岸良一); September 3, 1983 (age 42); Nagoya, Aichi Prefecture, Japan
- Known for: Light novel illustration, Anime character design
- Notable work: Heaven's Memo Pad; Hanasaku Iroha
- Website: maigo.jp

Mel Kishida (岸田 メル, Kishida Meru; born September 3, 1983) is a Japanese illustrator. His works include both light novel illustration and anime character design. His major works include the character designer of the Hanasaku Iroha anime and character designer for the Arland Atelier game series, as well as being the illustrator of the Heaven's Memo Pad light novel series.

== Works ==
List of works in books
Year	Title	Role	Publisher	Notes	Source
2012	Anna Smudge: Professional Shrink (アンナとプロフェッショナルズ, Anna to Purofeshonaruzu; lit. 'Anna and the Professionals'); Written by MAC	Illustrations	Media Factory, 2 volumes		
2007–14	Heaven's Memo Pad light novels Written by Hikaru Sugii	Illustrations	Imprinted in Dengeki Bunko; Published by ASCII Media Works, 9 volumes		
2012	Gakusei Shōjo (ja:楽聖少女); Written by Hikaru Sugii	Illustrations	Imprinted in Dengeki Bunko, 4 volumes		
2007–present	Shinigami Hime no Saikon (ja:死神姫の再婚; lit. 'The Death God Princess' Remarriage'); Written by Meiya Onogami	Illustrations	Imprinted in B's-Log, 19 volumes		
2005–10	Paracelsus no Musume (ja:パラケルススの娘, Parakerususu no Musume; lit. 'The Daughter of Paracelsus'); Written by Yu Godai	Illustrations	Imprinted in MF Bunko J, 10 volumes		
2008–12	Red Data Girl novel series Written by Noriko Ogiwara	Illustrations	Kadokawa Sneaker Bunko edition Published by Kadokawa Shoten in 6 volumes		

=== Anime ===
List of works in anime
Year	Series	Crew role	Notes	Source
2010	Sound of the Sky	Original character design		
2011	Hanasaku Iroha	Original character design		
2011	Heaven's Memo Pad	Original character design		
2013	Hanasaku Iroha: Home Sweet Home	Original character design		
2013	RDG Red Data Girl	Original character design		
2015	Wooser's Hand-to-Mouth Life: Phantasmagoric Arc	End card illustration, Ep. 10	Also guest voice acting role as Masked Swordsman.	
2021	Blue Reflection Ray	Original character design		

=== Video games ===
List of works in video games
Year	Series	Crew role	Notes	Source
2009	Atelier Rorona: The Alchemist of Arland	Character design	Also remake for 2015	
2010	Atelier Totori: The Adventurer of Arland	Character design		
2011	Atelier Meruru: The Apprentice of Arland	Character design		
2017	Blue Reflection	Character design, Supervisor		
2019	Atelier Lulua: The Scion of Arland	Character design		
2021	Blue Reflection: Second Light	Character design		

=== Artbooks ===
- Traditional White
- Fruits Gift

=== Other ===
- 22/7 (Original Character Designer for Tsubomi Hiragi and Sumika Orihara)
