= The Good Witch of the West =

Japanese fantasy novel series by Noriko Ogiwara

- Cover of the first shinsoban of The Good Witch of the West, published by Chuokoron-Shinsha in September 1997

西の善き魔女 (Nishi no Yoki Majo)
- Genre: Drama, Fantasy, Romance
- Novel series
- Written by: Noriko Ogiwara
- Published by: Chuokoron-Shinsha
- English publisher: NA: Tokyopop
- Imprint: C Novels Fantasia
- Original run: 1997 – 2003
- Volumes: 8
- Manga
- Written by: Noriko Ogiwara
- Illustrated by: Haruhiko Momokawa
- Published by: Mag Garden
- English publisher: NA: Tokyopop
- Magazine: Comic Blade
- Original run: July 9, 2004 – December 10, 2007
- Volumes: 8
- Anime television series
- Directed by: Katsuichi Nakayama
- Produced by: Shigeru Tateishi; Taimei Yamaguchi; Hiroyuki Ōmori; Katsumi Koike; Takayuki Hamatsu; Shinji Nakajima
- Written by: Atsuhiro Tomioka
- Music by: Hikaru Nanase
- Studio: Hal Film Maker
- Licensed by: NA: Maiden Japan
- Original network: KBS Kyoto, TV Kanagawa, BS Asahi, Tokyo MX TV
- Original run: April 8, 2006 – July 1, 2006
- Episodes: 13

The Good Witch of the West (Japanese: 西の善き魔女, Hepburn: Nishi no Yoki Majo) is a series of fantasy novels by Noriko Ogiwara, published by Chuokoron-Shinsha.

The series has been adapted into both a manga series and a thirteen episode anime television series subtitled Astraea Testament broadcast in Japan in 2006. The story revolves around a fifteen-year-old commoner who discovers that she is really a princess. The manga and novels were licensed for English language releases in North America by Tokyopop. After Tokyopop went out of business JManga began translating the manga and has progressed farther than TokyoPop did.

== Plot ==
Firiel Dee is given her mother's necklace by her childhood friend, Rumpelstiltskin (Roux). The necklace was meant as a birthday gift from her remote father, the astrologer Gideon Dee. All fifteen-year-olds are welcome to attend a public ball at the royal Roland castle in honor of the Queen's Birthday, and Firiel decides to wear her new necklace to the celebration. When it is recognized as a missing talisman of the royal family, this leads to the revelation that Firiel is the daughter of royalty and automatically in competition to become the next Queen.

== Characters ==
Firiel Dee (フィリエル·ディー, Firieru Dii)
Voiced by: Fumiko Orikasa
The main protagonist, Firiel is taken care of by Mr. and Mrs. Holy because her father never leaves the tower, the lab in which he and Roux study. She becomes recognized as one of the candidates for the Queen's position and finds out her mother was a famed member of the royal family.
Roux Liskin (Rumpel Stiltskin) (ルー·ルツキン, Rū Rutsukin)
Voiced by: Hiromi Hirata
Firiel's childhood friend as well as her father's student and assistant. He protects Firiel throughout the series and is obviously enamored by her. In the start of the series, Firiel looks at him more like a little brother, though they later develop a serious relationship. His past is troubled and shrouded in darkness as he later tells Firiel that he cannot be with her for that reason because to him she "shines like the sun itself". In the anime, they both end up returning home as a couple. Adale writes that Firiel, as a candidate, was the one who chose the most happiest life, because she lives in the place she loves with the person she loves.
Adel Roland (アデイル·ロウランド, Adeiru Rōrando)
Voiced by: Chiwa Saito
A candidate for the Queen's position and a princess of the Roland family who becomes one of Firiel's friends. She is a fantasy author whose stories often include yaoi pairings inspired by Roux and her brother Eusis.
Leandra Cheviat
Voiced by: Rie Tanaka
Leandra is a candidate for the Queen's position and a princess of the Cheviat family. She is also the headmistress of a school for girls so that she can maintain her high status and reputation. She is the archnemisis of both Firiel and Adel, as she sees them as threats to herself and her position. She tries to seduce and blackmail Roux, but is unsuccessful. Though she may seem like a bad person, she is in fact loyal to her country.
Ravenna
Voiced by: Kaho Kōda
Firiel meets Ravenna at the school for privileged girls. Ravenna is the leader of the group that controls the school. She is Leandra's right-hand man. She is one of the best sword fighters in the school.
Ingraine
Voiced by: Mitsuki Saiga
Ingraine attends the same school as Firiel, where her sword fighting skills are rivaled only by Ravenna's. She agrees to train Firiel for her duel with Ravenna to avenge her friend Roselitte, who she believes was killed by one of the girls in Ravenna's faction. Later in the series, she is seen fighting dragons side by side with Eusis, for whom she has developed a romantic attachment.
Gideon Dee (ギディオン·ディー, Gidion Dii)
Firiel's father is a scientist and researcher who took Roux in as a student. Firiel thinks that he cares more about his Roux than her. It is revealed that he helped Duchess Edilin escape from the palace and married her.
Tabitha Holy (タビサ·ホーリー, Tabisa Hōrii)
Voiced by: Yoshino Ohtori
Mrs. Holy takes care of Firiel before she lives in the palace; she appears throughout the series and helps Firiel.
Bo Holy (ボゥ·ホーリー, Bō Hōrii)
Voiced by: Hiroshi Naka
Mr. Holy took care of Firiel along with his wife. He dies trying to save Firiel and Roux from members of the Snake Rod.
Marie
Voiced by: Ayumi Fujimura
Marie is Firiel's friend from the village who often calls her "fairy girl" because of Firiel's fanciful nature. She becomes close friends with Adel as they both try to persuade Firiel to marry Eusis.
Eusis Roland (ユーシス·ロウランド, Yūshisu Rōrando)
Voiced by: Kishô Taniyama
Eusis is Adel's older brother, who also protects Firiel in the series. Eusis is considered to be Roux's rival for Firiel's affection. He proposes to Firiel on several occasions and eventually is rejected.
Lot Chrisbard (ロット·クリスバード, Rotto Kurisubādo)
Voiced by: Akira Ishida
Eusis's close friend. He often teases Eusis about his growing feelings for Firiel. He is cunning and manipulative.
Bard
Voiced by: Teruaki Ogawa
A mysterious minstrel with magical powers and close guardian to the queen of Gulair.
Edilin (エディリーン, Ediriin)
Edilin is Firiel's mother. She was a duchess of high standing in the royal court and a candidate to become the next queen of Astrea. She disappeared along with her touchstone, a very valuable necklace now in Firiel's possession. Adel and Eusis recognize the necklace from a picture on the wall of their father's study. She is seen in flashback to have been very similar to Firel - a smart, somewhat rebellious young woman who was willing to throw away everything for love. After running away, she changed her name to Yuna (a feminine alter-name for Astrea which means "my one and only").

== Media ==
=== Novel ===
There are eight novels out for Nishi no Yoki Majo released from September 25, 1997, to May 25, 2003. The last three novels are side stories. The series was authored by Noriko Ogiwara. It was published by Chuokoron-Shinsha. It was licensed for English language release in North America by Tokyopop.

No.	Title	Original release date	English release date
1	Sera Fiirudo no Shōjo (セラフィールドの少女)	September 25, 1997; 978-4-12-500491-4	— 978-1427800459
2	Himitsu no Hanazono (秘密の花園)	November 25, 1997; 978-4-12-500503-4	— 978-1427800466
3	Bara no Namae (薔薇の名前)	April 25, 1998; 978-4-12-500526-3	—
4	Sekai no Kanata no Mori (世界のかなたの森)	November 25, 1998; 978-4-12-500568-3	—
5	Gin no Tori Purachina no Tori (銀の鳥プラチナの鳥)	May 25, 1999; 978-4-12-500591-1	—
6	Yami no Hidarite (闇の左手)	January 1, 2000; 978-4-12-500635-2	—
7	Kin no Ito Tsumugeba (金の糸紡げば)	September 25, 2000; 978-4-12-500673-4	—
8	Mahiru no Hoshi Meisou (真昼の星迷走)	May 25, 2003; 978-4-12-500805-9	—

=== Manga ===
- Origin: Japan
- Type: Shōnen
- Author: Noriko Ogiwara
- Artist: Haruhiko Momokawa
- Publishers: Mag Garden in Japan, Tokyopop in USA, and Kami in France
- Prepublished as: Comic Blade
- First volume release: July 9, 2004
- Number of volumes: 7 (last volume never released in English)

=== Anime ===
An anime adaptation of The Good Witch of the West, directed by Katsuichi Nakayama and animated by Hal Film Maker, was aired in Japan between April 8, 2006, and July 1, 2006, containing thirteen episodes. The anime was aired on KBS Kyoto, AT-X, BS Asahi, Gunma TV, Tokyo MX, and TVK. The regular and limited edition of the DVDs were released from July 7, 2006, to January 25, 2007, on the same day, totaling a set of 7.

The series uses two pieces of theme music. "Starry Waltz", performed by Kukui is used for the opening theme of all episodes. "Kanata" (彼方), sung by Mariaria, is used for the ending theme.

At its September release slate, Section23 Films announced that Maiden Japan will release the series in North America.

No.	Title	Original air date
1	"Edeline's Necklace" "Ediriin no Kubikazari" (エディリーンの首飾り)	April 8, 2006
Firiel is excited that today is the Queen's birthday and thrilled to go a ball but before she goes, Roux comes to give Firiel a gift from her father. It is a necklace that she decides to wear to the ball where she meets Lot Chrisbard and Eusis Roland, whom she dances with. After the dance, Adel Roland sees Firiel's necklace and says that it is a missing Queen Jewel. Roux comes to take Firiel home and when they get home they find out that Firiel father has gone on south and that his work is considered 'heretical', therefore putting everyone in danger. A secret organization comes to capture Firiel and Roux who, at the very end, escape.
2	"The Land of Children" "Koyagitachi no Yukue" (子ヤギたちの行方)	April 15, 2006
Firiel went to Roland castle asking for help. Later Ru was rescued and Firiel was asked to go privileged girls school to help expand her knowledge....
3	"The Secret Garden" "Himitsu no Hanazono" (秘密の花園)	April 22, 2006
Firiel gone to privileged girls but there wait for her is full of threat from student council and later on there a girl was murdered... What will happen to Firiel and when Ru and Marie came to school?
4	"The Darkness of the Garden" "Hanazono no Kurayami" (花園の暗闇)	April 29, 2006
Rouxnet was called to the student council. Ru and Marie came to school to help Firiel that was in trouble and later on there was a duel between Firiel and Ravenna.
5	"Secretly Maneuvering Flowers" "An'yaku Suru Hanabana" (暗躍する花々)	May 6, 2006
6	"The Court Waltz" "Kyūtei Enbukyoku" (宮廷円舞曲)	May 13, 2006
7	"Pavane for the Late Princess" "Naki Ōjo no Tame no Kujakumai" (亡き王女のための孔雀舞)	May 20, 2006
8	"Fantasia and Fugue" "Gensōkyoku to Tonsoukyoku" (幻想曲と遁走曲)	May 27, 2006
9	"Forest Beyond the World" "Sekai no Kanata no Mori" (世界のかなたの森)	June 3, 2006
10	"Invisible Love" "Mienai Ai" (見えない愛)	June 10, 2006
11	"The Minstrel's Road" "Ginyūshijin no Michi" (吟遊詩人の道)	June 17, 2006
12	"Midday Star" "Mahiru no Hoshi" (真昼の星)	June 24, 2006
13	"Words" "Kotoba" (ことば)	July 1, 2006

=== Soundtrack ===
The original soundtrack for the anime adaptation, composed by Masumi Itō, was released in Japan by Geneon Entertainment on July 26, 2006. It contains 39 tracks.
