= Blue Reflection: Second Light =

2021 role-playing video game

- Developer: Gust
- Publisher: Koei Tecmo
- Directors: Kenzo Kobori; Junya Tanaka; Risako Yoshida
- Producers: Junzo Hosoi; Shuichi Takashino; Akira Tsuchiya
- Designer: Yuichiro Kosako
- Programmer: Takaaki Ohta
- Artist: Mel Kishida
- Writer: Akiko Waba
- Composer: Hayato Asano
- Series: Blue Reflection
- Platforms: PlayStation 4, PlayStation 5, Nintendo Switch, Nintendo Switch 2, Microsoft Windows
- Release: PlayStation 4: JP: October 21, 2021; NA: November 9, 2021; EU: November 9, 2021; Nintendo Switch: JP: October 21, 2021; NA: November 9, 2021; EU: November 9, 2021; Microsoft Windows: NA: November 9, 2021; EU: November 9, 2021; PlayStation 5, Switch 2: WW: July 30, 2026
- Genre: Role-playing
- Mode: Single-player

Blue Reflection: Second Light (Blue Reflection: Tie (BLUE REFLECTION(ブルーリフレクション) TIE/帝(タイ)) is a 2021 is a role-playing video game developed by Gust and a sequel to both the 2017 game Blue Reflection and the anime Blue Reflection Ray. It was published by Koei Tecmo first in October 2021 in Japan for the PlayStation 4 and Nintendo Switch, and worldwide in November for the console market as well as Microsoft Windows via Steam.

It follows a young teenage girl named Ao Hoshizaki, who awakens with three other girls in a mysterious school surrounded by water. Having lost their memories, the girls begin their quest to uncover the mystery of who they are and why they are together in this place. As Ao, the player can craft items for use in combat and structures around the school to aid in game play, talk and interact with the cast of characters, and explore environments known as "heartscapes" to fight Demons using their newly-gained magical girl powers.

A four game bundle titled Blue Reflection Quartet will release on PlayStation 5, Microsoft Windows, Nintendo Switch, and Nintendo Switch 2 on July 30, 2026. This includes remastered versions of Blue Reflection, and Blue Reflection: Second Light, alongside two new games — a console remake of the mobile game Blue Reflection: Sun and a video game adaption of the anime Blue Reflection Ray. The games will be digitally only in English.

== Synopsis ==
Ao Hoshizaki, a girl who regards herself as "normal," was on her way to summer classes when she suddenly vanished and awoke at an isolated high school surrounded by water, with no other people and no understanding of her situation. Ao meets three other girls who had been there for longer than her: Kokoro Utsubo, Rena Miyauchi, and Yuki Kinjou. All four girls had a ring appear on their finger when they arrived, and Ao is the only girl who was able to even vaguely retain her memories of the real world. The girls receive text messages from a person known as "ReSource" warning them to stay away from the entrance to a mysterious world called the Faraway. The girls enter and are attacked by a Demon, and ReSource instructs Ao, Kokoro, and Rena to use their rings and emotions to create weapons and become Reflectors.

Slowly, Ao and the other girls begin to recall their memories as they venture into parallel dimensions, dubbed heartscapes.

== Gameplay ==
The player can have Ao walk around the school and talk with the other girls to take on side quests. Scenes occur during school, some of which involve questions from the other girls in the group, which affect their relationship to Ao depending on the player's answers. In a series of dates and bonding episodes, the player is rewarded with additional support benefits during battles. Using items obtained from heartscapes, Ao can craft new items that provide benefits and can build new attractions on the school grounds that increase character stats and serve as new locations for dates. Similar to the first title, the player can also interact with characters by messaging them through an in-game mobile app for listening to crafting requests and to ask on a date.

When exploring a heartscape, battle is initiated when a player hits an enemy from behind or an enemy hits the player head on. Operating on a turn based system, the characters cast spells by spending their own individual "ether" meters which build up over real time during combat. Spending ether points increases a character's Gears level for that battle, which increases the maximum amount of ether available to a character and the speed at which characters gain ether, in addition to granting the characters more powerful spells.

== Reception ==
Reception

Aggregate score
Aggregator	Score
Metacritic	PS4: 77/100; Switch: 78/100; PC: 78/100

Review scores
Publication	Score
Electronic Gaming Monthly	4/5
Nintendo Life	9/10
RPGFan	90/100
Digitally Downloaded	5/5

Blue Reflection: Second Light received generally positive reception. Electronic Gaming Monthly noted that the game's difficulty was low, but that it suited the game. Digitally Downloaded found and praised yuri elements in the dialogue between the girls.
