= The Jade Trilogy =

Book series by Noriko Ogiwara

- Author: Noriko Ogiwara
- Language: Japanese
- Genre: Fantasy, Fantasy novel
- Publisher: (Japan) Futake Publishing (United States) Farrar Straus & Giroux Viz Media
- Publication date: 1988, 1991, 1996
- Publication place: Japan
- Media type: Print (Hardback & Paperback)
- Pages: (Japan) 418pp (Japan) 670pp (Japan) 484pp (United States) 340pp (United States) 329pp
- ISBN: 4-8288-1330-6; ISBN 978-4-8288-1330-1; ISBN 4-8288-4980-7; ISBN 978-4-8288-4980-5; ISBN 4-19-860558-0; ISBN 978-4-8288-4980-5
- Preceded by: Dragon Sword and Wind Child
- Followed by: Mirror Sword and Shadow Prince (Hakuchou Iden); Usubeni Tennyo

The Jade Trilogy is a set of three fantasy novels written by Japanese award-winning fantasy writer Noriko Ogiwara. The trilogy consists of the original novel and its two sequels.

== Overview ==
The first novel of the trilogy, originally written in Japanese as: Sorairo Magatama (空色勾玉 "Sky-colored Jade"; see magatama), won her several awards for children's literature. Translated by Cathy Hirano, the novel was first published in English by Farrar, Straus and Giroux as Dragon Sword and Wind Child. Several years after falling out of print, a second edition of the novel was published by VIZ Media LLC with an updated translation by Hirano.

After the success of Dragon Sword and Wind Child, Ogiwara later wrote a sequel to the story of the original novel, titled Hakuchou Iden (白鳥異伝 "Swan's Strange Legend"). The sequel was also praised by the Japanese media and fans of the original novel. The second novel of the trilogy was translated by Hirano and the English edition was released by Viz Media LLC as Mirror Sword and Shadow Prince on May 17, 2011.

The author would later continue the story with another sequel called Usubeni Tennyo (薄紅天女 "Pink Nymph"); this book was also a favorite among fans of the original novel and like the first two novels is still in print to this day in Japan. The last sequel of the trilogy is currently unavailable in English.

The series is based on Japanese mythology and legends: Dragon Sword and Wind Child is derived from the origin myths in the Kojiki and Nihon Shoki; Mirror Sword and Shadow Prince is a retelling of the legend of Japanese folk hero Yamato Takeru; while Usubeni Tennyo is adapted from the Sarashina Nikki and the legend of Aterui.

== Publication History ==
Book	Kanji title	Romaji title	Original title, literal translation	Notes
Book	Publication date	ISBN	English publication title	Notes
Book	Summary			Notes
1	空色勾玉	Sorairo Magatama	Sky-Coloured Jade	1 volume
1	August 25, 1988; June 4, 2010 (bunko)	ISBN 978-4828813301; ISBN 978-4198931667 (bunko)	Dragon Sword and Wind Child	1 volume
1	Saya is a young woman who has been raised to worship the immortal children of the God of Light, but begins to attract the attention of the followers of the Goddess of Darkness. Recognized as the latest reincarnation of the Water Maiden, Saya has the power to quell the spirit of the Dragon Sword, a weapon that embodies the rage of the Fire God after he was killed for burning his mother, the Goddess of Darkness, to death. She finds her destiny is tied with Chihaya, the Wind Child and the third child of the God of Light, who is capable of wielding the Dragon Sword, the only weapon that can slay the gods.			1 volume
2	白鳥異伝	Hakuchou Iden	Swan's Strange Legend	1 volume 2 volumes (bunko)
2	July 1, 1996; July 2, 2010 (bunko)	ISBN 978-4198605407; ISBN 978-4198931841 (part 1, bunko), ISBN 978-4198931858 (part 2, bunko)	Mirror Sword and Shadow Prince	1 volume 2 volumes (bunko)
2	Toko is a member of the Tachibana clan and a potential high priestess who may possess the power to tame the inherent rage that has descended through the imperial family founded by the union of the Water Maiden Saya and the Wind Child Chihaya. Her best friend, Oguna, is an orphan who is unaware of his true origins when he is chosen to become the crown prince's shadow. Toko and Oguna are further driven apart when it is revealed that Oguna is an illegitimate child of the imperial family and heir to a terrible power. When the chosen Tachibana priestess is unable to quell the emperor's rage, her decision to elope and rebel with the crown prince brings about disaster to the Tachibana clan. Toko must set out gather the five magatama to obtain the power to stop Oguna from destroying the world.			1 volume 2 volumes (bunko)
3	薄紅天女	Usubeni Tennyo	Pink Heavenly Maiden	1 volume 2 volumes (bunko)
3	August 1, 1996; August 6, 2010 (bunko)	ISBN 978-4198605582; ISBN 978-4198932046 (part 1, bunko), ISBN 978-4198932053 (part 2, bunko)		1 volume 2 volumes (bunko)
3	The Emishi tribe of the north have long been at war with the imperial capital. Saddened by the plight of her people, Princess Sonoe is spurred on by a prophecy that a heavenly maiden from the east will save the capital and sets off in disguise to recover the sacred magatama. In the north, a carefree young man, Ataka, learns that he is a descendant of the Emishi. When he falls into a trap by those who wish to use his shamanic abilities for their own ends, his family and friends set out to rescue him. Sonoe and Ataka's paths begin to intertwine in a quest to resolve the blood feud between their tribes.			1 volume 2 volumes (bunko)
