= Red Data Girl =

Japanese novel series

- Cover of the first novel volume

RDG レッドデータガール (RDG Reddo Dēta Gāru)
- Genre: Modern fantasy
- Novel series
- Written by: Noriko Ogiwara
- Illustrated by: Komako Sakai (original); Mel Kishida (Sneaker Bunko re-edition)
- Published by: Kadokawa Shoten
- Original run: July 4, 2008 – November 29, 2012
- Volumes: 6
- Manga
- Written by: Ranmaru Kotone
- Published by: Kadokawa Shoten
- Magazine: Shōnen Ace
- Original run: October 26, 2012 – July 26, 2014
- Volumes: 5
- Anime television series
- Directed by: Toshiya Shinohara
- Written by: Michiko Yokote
- Music by: Masumi Ito; Myu
- Studio: P.A. Works
- Licensed by: AUS: Hanabee; NA: Funimation
- Original network: Tokyo MX, KNB, Sun TV, TVQ, Chiba TV, BS11, TV Saitama, tvk
- Original run: March 16, 2013 – June 1, 2013
- Episodes: 12
- icon

Red Data Girl (RDG レッドデータガール, Ārudījī Reddo Dēta Gāru) is a series of fantasy novels written by Noriko Ogiwara. Six volumes have been released. The first volume was published by Kadokawa Shoten in 2008, while the last was published in 2012. The manga adaptation, illustrated by Ranmaru Kotone and published by Kadokawa Shoten, was serialized between 2012 and 2014. A 12-episode anime television series adaptation by P.A. Works aired between April and June 2013.

== Plot ==
The story revolves around Izumiko Suzuhara, a 15-year-old girl who was raised at Tamakura Shrine, which is a part of the Kumano Shrines World Heritage Site. She has the ability to destroy any electrical device that she touches. Despite being shy, she wants to try living in the city. Her guardian Yukimasa Sagara recommends that she enroll at Hōjō High School in Tokyo accompanied by his son, Miyuki Sagara. Miyuki has trained to become a yamabushi from a young age. While in Tokyo on a middle school field trip, an entity named "Himegami" appears. Izumiko learns that she is a yorishiro (or, more properly, a yorimashi, as she is a possessed person, not object), a vessel for a Shinto spirit known as a kami. She also learns that Miyuki is tasked with protecting her.

== Characters ==
=== Main characters ===
Izumiko Suzuhara (鈴原 泉水子, Suzuhara Izumiko)
Voiced by: Saori Hayami (Japanese); Bryn Apprill (English)
Izumiko is described by Miyuki as a dull-looking girl with twin braids. Before beginning her first year of high school in Tokyo she wore red-rimmed glasses that were given to her by her mother. At the beginning of the series she is very timid and shy, and doesn't like to share her desires or opinions with others. However, as the series progresses she begins to change and becomes more confident. One trait that shocks most people that meet her is that she has lived a few years of her life without using electronics, because they used to break whenever she tried to. It is revealed in episode 2 that Izumiko is destined to serve as the vessel for a powerful ancient goddess Himegami (姫神; Voiced by: Rie Tanaka (Japanese); Caitlin Glass (English)) and will most likely be her final vessel. Later in the season, it is revealed that her mother gave her the glasses to block her vision, because she "sees too much". Without them she can identify spirit agents, ghosts, and gods; though they appear to her as frightening creatures covered in a black aura.
Miyuki Sagara (相楽 深行, Sagara Miyuki)
Voiced by: Kōki Uchiyama (Japanese); Micah Solusod (English)
Miyuki is the son of Yukimasa and also a mountain monk-in-training. When he is first introduced he is very cruel to Izumiko and said that he couldn't believe a goddess was in such a dull girl like her. However, after seeing her powers and learning more about her he began to soften up towards her. Even after Yukimasa gave him the chance to go back home he decided to stay with Izumiko and protect her. After moving to Tokyo together, Izumiko and Miyuki grow closer; but Miyuki doesn't believe he can truly protect Izumiko. He believes he is weak and can't even take care of himself. Miyuki has a very strained relationship with his father, whom he hates. At first when Miyuki refuses to serve Izumiko, Yukimasa took him into the woods it is implied that he beat him into submission. Yukimasa often calls Miyuki unworthy of serving Izumiko and belittles him every chance he gets. As the series progresses he begins to fall in love with Izumiko.
Mayura Sōda (宗田 真響, Sōda Mayura)
Voiced by: Madoka Yonezawa (Japanese); Kristi Kang (English)
Triplets older sister of Manatsu and Masumi. In the third episode she is introduced as Izumiko's cheerful and kind roommate. However, in episode four it is revealed that she is a mountain monk and is currently involved in a secret school-wide rivalry between herself and Ichijō. Although she seems kind, she at times can be just as calculating as Ichijō. After witnessing Izumiko's ability to identify Ichijō's spirit agents, she realizes that Izumiko and Miyuki might be more powerful than she thought. She decides to try and recruit Izumiko, and attacks Miyuki to reveal his true strength.
Manatsu Sōda (宗田 真夏, Sōda Manatsu)
Voiced by: Kaito Ishikawa (Japanese); Joel McDonald (English)
Triplets younger brother of Mayura. One of Manatsu's defining characteristics is his intense love of horses. Especially his first horse, Tabi. He is usually very cheerful and kind, but when it comes to his family he can be very determined and fiercely protective just like Masumi.
Masumi Sōda (宗田 真澄, Sōda Masumi)
Voiced by: Ryōhei Kimura (Japanese); Chris Burnett (English)
Triplets younger brother of Mayura. He died of a heart defect while taking an afternoon nap when he was six. Masumi is very protective of his siblings and does his best to keep them safe when he can. Mayura and Manatsu are capable of summoning him as a divine spirit and communicate with him often. In his fight against Ichijō, it is clear he is very powerful and capable of devouring spirits. He has a very playful personality and sometimes likes to dress in girl's clothing much to chagrin of his identical brother Manatsu. However, when his family is threatened he can become serious and have a much darker personality.
Yukimasa Sagara (相楽 雪政, Sagara Yukimasa)
Voiced by: Jun Fukuyama (Japanese); David Matranga (English)
The father of Miyuki, his sole intention is to protect the goddess. Despite being 33 years old, he looks quite young and lively. In some scenes in the anime it is shown that he is awfully strict and looks down upon Miyuki. He has a job as a model and is also a trained mountain monk.

=== Others ===
Yukariko Suzuhara (鈴原 紫子, Suzuhara Yukariko)
Voiced by: Romi Park (Japanese); Melanie Mason (English)
Izumiko's mother.
Daisei Suzuhara (鈴原 大成, Suzuhara Daisei)
Voiced by: Kazuhiko Inoue (Japanese); Robert McCollum (English)
Izumiko's father, who works overseas.
Satoru Wamiya (和宮 さとる, Wamiya Satoru)
Voiced by: Rie Kugimiya (Japanese); Ryan Reynolds (English)
Izumiko's spirit familiar; he gained a physical appearance due to her wish to have friends. He can control other students and tries to use them to get rid of Miyuki for the purpose of keeping Izumiko from Tokyo.
Ichijō Takayanagi (高柳 一条, Takayanagi Ichijō)
Voiced by: Hirofumi Nojima (Japanese); Clifford Chapin (English)
Student council president candidate and top student. He badly desired to become the student council president, and acquired assistance from Spirit agents. However, he bore a grudge against Mayura for competing against him. In the end he lost the battle but intended to ruin the Sengoku festival organized by the student council. When Izumiko found out his plans, she went into a rage and transformed him into a white dog. In the end, however, he was converted back.
Honoka Jean Kisaragi (如月・ジーン・仄香, Kisaragi Jīn Honoka)
Voiced by: Sarah Emi Bridcutt (Japanese); Leah Clark (English)
Student council president and associate of Hodaka.
Hodaka Murakami (村上 穂高, Murakami Hodaka)
Voiced by: Akira Ishida (Japanese); Jason Liebrecht (English)
Former student council president of Hōjō Academy. He also identifies himself as an oracle and a judge (or "sayaniwa") in the battle to become a World Heritage Candidate. The goddess within Izumiko also called him the male god of art and said that she knew him from hundreds of years ago.
Rena Akinokawa (秋乃川 玲奈, Rena Akinokawa)
Voiced by: Ikumi Nakagami (Japanese); Sara Ragsdale (English)
Student council member and friend of Honoka.
Yoshiki Hayakawa (早川 佳樹, Hayakawa Yoshiki)
Voiced by: Mamoru Miyano (Japanese); Kyle Phillips (English)
Festival committee member.
Shingo Nonomura (野々村 慎吾, Nonomura Shingo)
Voiced by: Kenji Nomura (Japanese); Jason Douglas (English)
Izumiko's driver.
Takeomi Suzuhara (鈴原 竹臣, Suzuhara Takeomi)
Voiced by: Atsushi Ii (Japanese); Kent Williams (English)
Izumiko's grandfather.
Sawa Suemori (末森 佐和, Suemori Sawa)
Voiced by: Shukuko Tsugawa (Japanese); Stephanie Young (English)
Izumiko's maid and caretaker.
Ayumi Watanabe (渡辺 あゆみ, Watanabe Ayumi)
Voiced by: Kanako Miyamoto (Japanese); Noelle Fabian (English)
One of Izumiko's friends from her previous school.
Haruna Mita (三田 春菜, Mita Haruna)
Voiced by: Ayaka Suwa (Japanese); Jamie Marchi (English)
Another one of Izumiko's friends from her previous school.
Yōhei Misaki (三崎 洋平, Misaki Yōhei)
Voiced by: Keisuke Kōmoto (Japanese); Clay Wheeler (English)
A student from Izumiko's previous school who plays volleyball.
Misa Koshikawa (越川 美沙, Koshikawa Misa)
Voiced by: Shōmi Tsuboki (Japanese); Alex Moore (English)
A student from Izumiko's previous school who bullied Izumiko.
Tomoya Ogawa (小川 智也, Ogawa Tomoya)
Voiced by: Ryōsuke Kanemoto (Japanese); Jeff Johnson (English)
Student council member.

== Media ==
=== Novel series ===
The novel series is written by Noriko Ogiwara and published by Kadokawa Shoten. The first volume was published under the Kadokawa Gin no Saji Series imprint on July 4, 2008, and the last, the sixth, on November 29, 2012. The series is illustrated by Komako Sakai in the original novel version (cover only), and Mel Kishida in the Sneaker Bunko light novel re-edition.

=== Manga ===
A manga series adaptation, illustrated by Ranmaru Kotone and published by Kadokawa Shoten in Monthly Shonen Ace magazine began serialization in December 2012 issue released on October 26, 2012. It ended its run in the September issue on July 26, 2014. The series was compiled into five tankōbon volumes between February 21, 2013, and September 26, 2014.

=== Anime ===
It was adapted into an anime television series by P.A. Works, with original character designs by Mel Kishida, directed by Toshiya Shinohara. The first episode was streamed on Niconico on March 16, 2013 and aired on television on April 4, 2013. The opening theme is "Small WorlDrop" (スモルワールドロップ, Sumoru Wārudoroppu) by Annabel, and the ending theme, "Yokan" (予感; lit. 'Premonition') by Masumi Itō. Funimation later added the English dub version in June 2014, alongside Date A Live, Karneval and Code:Breaker.

No.	Title	Niconico stream date	Original air date
1	"The First Transfer Student" "Hajimete no Tenkōsei" (はじめての転校生)	March 16, 2013	April 4, 2013
In the Tamakura Shrine, a sheltered and timid fifteen-year-old girl named Izumiko Suzuhara trims her bangs, taking the first step to change her appearance. At the middle school, Izumiko's friends Ayumi Watanabe and Haruna Mita praise Izumiko for her new hairstyle. In the computer lab, Izumiko searches online for sightseeing activities in Shinjuku, but she begins to hallucinate as if she was underwater, briefly speaking to her father Daisei Suzuhara on a video call before inadvertently causing a power outage. Via helicopter, a young mountain monk named Yukimasa Sagara takes Izumiko to the Wakayama Prefectural Hospital and School of Western Medicine in order to run some neuroimaging. Back at the Tamakura Shrine, Yukimasa's son Miyuki Sagara constantly berates Izumiko, but Yukimasa says that Miyuki is destined to be Izumiko's servant. Miyuki initially refuses to transfer to the middle school and storms out of the Takamura Shrine, while Yukimasa follows after him. When Miyuki and Yukimasa shortly return after dinner, Yukimasa explains that a badly bruised Miyuki tumbled down a cliff during his mountain training. The next day, Miyuki transfers to the middle school, announcing that he will live with Izumiko at the Takamura Shrine in the meantime.
2	"The First Palm of Someone's Hand" "Hajimete no Tenohira" (はじめての手のひら)	March 23, 2013	April 11, 2013
Izumiko receives a letter from her mother Yukariko Suzuhara, requesting to meet up during a field trip. After Izumiko confesses that computers and cellphones will malfunction by simply using them, Miyuki agrees to accompany Izumiko on the field trip. Taking an airplane to Shinjuku, Izumiko begins to sense a sinister black figure following her. At the Tokyo Metropolitan Government Building, Miyuki takes Izumiko to the northern observation deck, but Yukariko does not show up. A series of unfortunate events start to occur when Izumiko and Miyuki travel towards Yukariko's house via subway and taxi. Izumiko holds Miyuki's hand to calm down when they are approached by the sinister black figure, turning out to just be Yukimasa. Bringing Izumiko and Miyuki to Yukariko's house, Yukimasa privately informs Miyuki that Izumiko is among the women susceptible to spirit possession, of which many people would want to exploit for personal gain. Izumiko momentarily awakens as a powerful ancient goddess called the Himegami, who urges Yukimasa and Miyuki to protect Izumiko as her last vessel. After Izumiko regains control of her body, Yukimasa allows Miyuki to transfer to another school if he no longer wants to protect Izumiko.
3	"My First Familiar" "Hajimete no Otsukai" (はじめてのお使い)	March 30, 2013	April 18, 2013
In the mountains overlooking the ocean, Izumiko considers attending Hōjō Academy in Tokyo with Miyuki. At the middle school, Ayumi and Haruna urge Izumiko to give a gift bag to her mysterious classmate Satoru Wamiya. Satoru notices that Izumiko has a change of heart since her field trip, realizing that she no longer hates Miyuki. After saving Miyuki from being attacked by three mind-controlled male students, Izumiko's driver Shingo Nonomura drives Izumiko and Miyuki towards the Tamakura Shrine. As Izumiko believes that Satoru wants to get rid of Miyuki, Satoru transforms into a crow and crashes Shingo's car off a cliff into the woods. Revealed as a tengu mountain deity, Satoru appears and summons a thunderstorm, saying that he existed in human form after Izumiko previously wished for a friend. Satoru disappears when Izumiko says that she wants to attend Hōjō Academy. In the aftermath, a recovering Shingo informs Izumiko and Miyuki that Satoru is Izumiko's familiar for the Himegami. Satoru later requests Izumiko to release him from his human form by performing a kagura in the mountains. Six months later, Miyuki gives Izumiko a tour of Hōjō Academy, where Izumiko is greeted by her new roommate Mayura Sōda.
4	"My First Roommate" "Hajimete no Rūmumeito" (はじめてのルームメイト)	April 6, 2013	April 25, 2013
Izumiko and Mayura meet up with Mayura's younger brother Manatsu Sōda in the cafeteria during lunchtime. Deciding to take off her eyeglasses, a gift given to her by Yukariko, Izumiko soon learns that she will be in the same homeroom class as Manatsu and not Mayura. In her homeroom class, Izumiko senses black aura coming from Ricardo, a Brazilian foreign exchange student. She is later invited by Ricardo to the media room after school, but this is a setup for top student Ichijō Takayanagi to determine if Izumiko is truly human. Miyuki uses his archery skills to dispel Ricardo, revealed as Ichijō's familiar. When Ichijō leaves, Miyuki finds a talisman on Izumiko's back, while Mayura appears to explain that Ricardo is a shikigami and Ichijō is an onmyōji. When Mayura accesses a password-protected website created by Ichijō called Mordoribashi Horoscopes, this proves to be a booby trap as the computer suddenly explodes and injures Mayura's left eye. Later in the girls' dorm room, Mayura explains that Izumiko and Miyuki must work together as a medium and an ascetic. Miyuki and Manatsu enter the girls' dorm room from the window as they agree to settle the score with Ichijō.
5	"My First Makeup" "Hajimete no Okeshō" (はじめてのお化粧)	April 13, 2013	May 2, 2013
Izumiko, Miyuki and Manatsu spectate outside as Mayuri and Manatsu's older brother Masumi Sōda, a divine spirit after his childhood death, is briefly summoned to absorb Ricardo and defeat Ichijō. The next day, Miyuki tells Izumiko never to talk about the Himegami since Mayura already believes that the two are merely partners. Yukimasa arrives with the news of being a part-time instructor at Hōjō Academy. In the study hall, Miyuki tells Izumiko to leave him alone. On Saturday morning at Mount Takao, Yukimasa explains to Izumiko that humans capable of spirit communication are becoming extinct and must be safeguarded. Upon later seeing Miyuki and Mayura becoming close, Izumiko runs off during a sunshower and wanders to a building, where she encounters current student council president Honoka Jean Kisaragi inviting her to meet former student council president Hodaka Murakami, a "judge" (or "sayaniwa"). Thanks to being alerted by female student Mikoto Kanzaki, Miyuki prevents Hodaka from nearly coercing Izumiko to perform a kagura, despite Izumiko already wearing makeup. Izumiko momentarily awakens as the Himegami, who warns Miyuki that she is the source of humanity's demise. While walking back, Miyuki tells Izumiko never to expect much from him.
6	"My First Slumber Party" "Hajimete no Otomari" (はじめてのお泊り)	April 20, 2013	May 9, 2013
Izumiko, Miyuki, Mayura and Manatsu travel to Nagano via bullet train, where Mayura tells Izumiko that she wants to join the student council's executive committee. They all enjoy a barbecue at the Sōda household, where Izumiko accidentally learns from Manatsu about Mayura's fan club. Later at night, Izumiko talks with Masumi in the backyard, where he encourages her to go to Mount Togakushi. During the camping trip on the following day, Mayura finds herself at odds with Honoka and Rena Akinokawa, who must remain neutral despite being aware that the Japanese history society is a front for Mayura's fan club. It is also revealed that Honoka and Rena are judges like Hodaka. After a student council meeting, Izumiko and Mayura take a walk as they discuss that Hōjō Academy is socially divided between two factions each supporting Mayura and Ichijō before the final round taking place during the cultural festival. Mayura ultimately wants to become a World Heritage candidate, a prestigious status with substantial rewards. As Izumiko and Mayura meet up with Miyuki and Manatsu, Mayura requests Miyuki to fully unleash his full power, despite Miyuki feeling hesitant in doing so.
7	"My First Time Getting Lost" "Hajimete no Maigo" (はじめての迷子)	April 27, 2013	May 16, 2013
Entering the spiritual plane, Mayura forces Miyuki to confront five yōkai, though Izumiko urges Mayura to stop on behalf of Miyuki's safety. After Miyuki is given a pewter staff, Izumiko reveals that Masumi has been impersonating Manatsu this whole time, while Manatsu was among the Japanese history society members disguised as yōkai. Miyuki, Mayura and Manatsu return to the real world, while a distraught Izumiko left behind is calmed down and guided out by Masumi. Izumiko is introduced to Mizuhiko Ryōgoku, the acting president of the Japanese history society. Later on, Manatsu is notified by his friend Mimura that his horse Tabi is extremely ill. Manatsu goes to Mimura's stable alone, while Masumi is summoned to accompany the others. Honoka performs a kagura while Ren plays the shamisen until nightfall during a student council meeting. The next day after breakfast, Izumiko and Miyuki visit Mimura's stable, where they find out that a depressed Manatsu gave the order to euthanize Tabi. Mayura suddenly arrives and argues with Manatsu over what is best for each other. Manatsu then runs away with Tabi as a divine spirit into the spiritual plane, leaving Izumiko, Miyuki and Mayura bereft of words.
8	"My First Wish" "Hajimete no Onegai" (はじめてのお願い)	May 4, 2013	May 23, 2013
Izumiko eventually enters the spiritual plane in search of Manatsu, and Masumi takes Izumiko to a cave that is sealed off with a boulder. Izumiko performs a kagura in order to break the boulder, but Manatsu and Masumi are revealed to have switched positions, meaning that Masumi is currently inside the cave. After Manatsu tells Izumiko to stop performing the kagura, Miyuki and Mayura arrive just before Masumi unleashes a dragon that breaks through the boulder. Using his pewter staff to stop the dragon from attacking Izumiko, Miyuki unveils his black wings. The Himegami suddenly appears and uses Miyuki's pewter staff, returning the dragon to its slumber inside the cave. Back in the real world, Izumiko and Miyuki stand before Yukariko, who momentarily leaves after revealing herself as the current vessel for the Himegami, hence the reason that Yukariko is barely around. Mayura is eternally grateful that Manatsu is now safe. Izumiko and Miyuki return to the Tamakura Shrine, where they spend the second half of summer vacation. After Miyuki asks Izumiko about her thoughts of being his partner, Miyuki mentions that Satoru resembled Ichijō.
9	"My First Debut" "Hajimete no Ohirome" (はじめてのお披露目)	May 11, 2013	May 30, 2013
The student council executive committee designates the Warring States period as the main theme of the cultural festival. Yoshiki Hayakawa, a member of the festival committee, informs Honoka that he is shorthanded on models for the traditional clothing demo. In the library, Ichijō approaches Izumiko with an invitation to join his side. While researching Hachiōji Castle, Izumiko finds herself in the infirmary, where Yukimasa warns her of a large-scale experiment that will occur during the cultural festival. As Izumiko fears that unbraiding her pigtails will awaken the Himegami, Miyuki urges Izumiko to learn the kuji technique as a form of self-defense. Izumiko soon agrees to become a fill-in model during the traditional clothing demo onstage with Mayura and Yoshiki. When Miyuki confronts Izumiko outside for what she did, Izumiko still awakens as the Himegami despite wearing her hair in pigtails. Miyuki takes the Himegami to the ruins of Hachiōji Castle, where she says that she brought humanity to its demise. After briefly summoning Satoru in the form of a crow, the Himegami reveals that she is protected by the kuji technique that Izumiko implemented earlier. Miyuki embraces the Himegami in desperation for Izumiko to regain control of her body.
10	"My First School Festival" "Hajimete no Gakuen-sai" (はじめての学園祭)	May 18, 2013	June 6, 2013
At night, Izumiko confides in Mayura about the Himegami, expressing the fear of losing herself. The food booths are opened and the stage events are announced on the first day of the cultural festival. Miyuki stops Izumiko from being nearly roped into participating in the parade, though he laughs when her double buns are exposed. He tells her that the Himegami only appears to prevent calamity from occurring. Honoka asks Izumiko and Miyuki to investigate the horror house after women and girls were reportedly becoming sick. Inside the horror house, Izumiko is haunted by the vengeful ghosts of Hachiōji Castle, though Miyuki later comforts Izumiko with a mudra. Miyuki has a disagreement with Yukimasa in the infirmary concerning Izumiko's protection. After lending her services in the parade, Mayura is forced into role-playing as the princess general of the defending army in the combat reenactment during the second day of the cultural festival, though this was a favor from Yoshiki so Mayura can take on Ichijō in the main army. In the girls' dorm room, Masumi appears and asks Izumiko about the concept of love. Before disappearing, Masumi mentions that there is a curse on campus.
11	"My First Rejection" "Hajimete no Kyozetsu" (はじめての拒絶)	May 25, 2013	June 13, 2013
Izumiko, Miyuki, Mayura and Manatsu search for the curse on campus. The combat reenactment is underway on the second day of the cultural festival. Returning Izumiko's cellphone to her, Miyuki urges Izumiko to believe that she will contact him in an emergency. Upon seeing a hot air balloon floating above a hill made by the science club, Izumiko successfully contacts Miyuki, who advises her to stay out of everyone's sight. Suddenly, Izumiko is approached by Ichijō and his second shikigami Klaus, a German foreign exchange student. Ichijō reveals that Hōjō Academy accepts foreign exchange students in order to pursue philosophies that would be effective on a global scale. When Miyuki finds himself lost on the hill due to an onmyōji spell, Izumiko soon notices that she is forgetting something important. Angelica Bernard, a French foreign exchange student, takes Izumiko to the riding grounds where the vengeful ghosts are gathered. After finding Miyuki near the library, Mayura proposes a fake engagement with him. After having a conversation with Ichijō, Izumiko realizes that Ichijō temporarily erased Miyuki from her mind. Izumiko implements the kuji technique, which quakes the entire campus after activating the power of the Himegami.
12	"World Heritage Girl" "Seikaiisan no Shojo" (世界遺産の少女)	June 1, 2013	June 20, 2013
After all electronics malfunction in the aftermath, Miyuki receives a pewter staff from Shingo. Miyuki and Manatsu enter the spiritual plane at the riding grounds, where they encounter Klaus and Angelica as well as Ichijō in the form of a dog. Upon summoning Satoru, Miyuki learns that Izumiko has confined herself in the woods, while Masumi eventually confesses his love to Izumiko. In the woods, Miyuki confronts the vengeful ghosts and crosses a rift. While Manatsu alerts Mayura about what has happened, Miyuki eventually contacts Izumiko on her cellphone. Satoru emerges from Izumiko's cellphone and chases away Masumi. When Miyuki appears in the blink of an eye, Izumiko accepts the fact that she is the Himegami reincarnate. As Miyuki urges Izumiko to say that she needs him, she breaks down in tears and he embraces her. Ichijō reveals that the hot air balloon is the source of the curse on campus. Izumiko performs a kagura to lift the curse on campus, as Masumi returns to Mayura in the real world. During a bonfire, Hodaka chooses Izumiko as the World Heritage candidate, while Izumiko and Miyuki sit on a bench, where she holds his hand after he dozes off.
