= Atelier Totori: The Adventurer of Arland =

2010 video game

- Developer: Gust Co. Ltd.
- Publishers: JP: Gust Co. Ltd.; WW: NIS America (PS3); WW: Tecmo Koei (Vita)
- Artist: Mel Kishida
- Composers: Kazuki Yanagawa; Ken Nakagawa
- Series: Atelier
- Engine: PhyreEngine
- Platforms: PlayStation 3, PlayStation Vita, Nintendo Switch, PlayStation 4, Microsoft Windows
- Release: June 24, 2010: Atelier Totori PlayStation 3; JP: June 24, 2010; NA: September 27, 2011; EU: September 30, 2011; AU: October 6, 2011 Atelier Totori Plus PlayStation Vita; JP: November 29, 2012; NA: March 19, 2013; PAL: March 20, 2013 Atelier Totori DX Nintendo Switch & PlayStation 4; JP: September 20, 2018; EU: December 4, 2018; NA: December 4, 2018 Microsoft Windows; WW: December 4, 2018
- Genre: Role-playing
- Mode: Single-player

Atelier Totori: The Adventurer of Arland (Note: Japanese: トトリのアトリエ ～アーランドの錬金術士 2～, Hepburn: Totori no Atorie: Ārando no Renkinjutsushi 2; lit. Atelier Totori: The Alchemist of Arland 2) is a Japanese role-playing video game developed by Gust Co. Ltd. It was first released for PlayStation 3 on June 24, 2010 in Japan.

Atelier Totori is the twelfth installment in the Atelier series, and it continues the series' emphasis on item synthesis. The game is the second in the Arland series and a direct sequel to Atelier Rorona: The Alchemist of Arland, taking place five years after the end of Atelier Rorona. It is followed by Atelier Meruru: The Apprentice of Arland, which was released in June 2011.

A version for the PlayStation Vita titled Atelier Totori Plus: The Adventurer of Arland was announced in the Dengeki PlayStation in August 2012, and released in Japan on 29 November 2012. An international release of the port by Tecmo Koei was hinted at by an R18+ rating appearing on the Australian Classification Board's website.

A port of the game titled Atelier Totori DX for Nintendo Switch and PlayStation 4 was released on September 20, 2018 in Japan, and on December 4, 2018 in the West along with an additional Microsoft Windows release worldwide.

== Story ==
In-game screenshot of the PS Vita version, depicting the exploration screen

Atelier Totori takes place 5 years after the previous game, Atelier Rorona. It begins with Totori in the fishing village of Alanya, her hometown, and ends after five years pass. Totooria Helmold is Rorona's student who is looking for her missing mother. After the events of Atelier Rorona, Rorona has been traveling across Arland teaching alchemy. One day, Totori and her older sister find a starving Rorona collapsed on their doorstep. She teaches Totori about alchemy, adopting her as a student. Since then, Totori has been learning alchemy on her own.

Everyone in Alanya believes that Totori's mother is dead. However, Totori thinks she is still alive, so she travels to Arland in order to become an adventurer and search for her. Players follow Totori on her journey exploring the world, improving her alchemy, and searching for her long-lost mother.

== Characters ==
Totooria Helmold
Known as Totori, she is the game's protagonist, a young alchemist and a student of Rorona. She travels to Arland in order to become an adventurer and search the world for her missing mother. She is very optimistic and believes her mother is still alive.

Cecilia Helmold
Totori's older sister who is very protective of her. She has already given up and assumes their mom is dead. She cares very much for Totori and does not like the idea of her becoming an adventurer. Her nickname is Ceci. She is playable as a DLC Character.

Gino Knab
Totori's childhood friend. He trains every day, hoping to become an adventurer with Totori.

Melvia Siebel
Ceci's childhood friend and an experienced adventurer. She agrees to watch over and protect Totori on adventures. She is well known in Alanya for her extreme strength.

Mimi Houllier von Schwarzlang
A young noble girl who also aspires to be an adventurer. She is very proud and considers Totori her rival.

Rorolina Frixell
Known as simply Rorona, she is the titular protagonist of the preceding installment – Atelier Rorona: The Alchemist of Arland – and Totori's alchemy teacher. She, Totori, and her teacher Astrid are the only known alchemists. She appeared at Totori and Ceci's doorstep, passed out from hunger, and, after destroying their house with a failed synthesis, became Totori's teacher. After hearing Totori's story of her mother, she decides to help Totori's endeavors.

Sterkenburg Cranach
Known as Sterk, he is a retired knight who is searching for the king of Arland while protecting Arland and novice adventurers from monsters at the same time. He frightens many characters with his face, even Rorona, who has known him for years. He is currently searching for Gio, the King of Arland, and helping Totori on the side.

Marc McBrine
An eccentric scientist with an interest in inventions and children. He comes off very aloof and abrasive due to his zealous pursuit of science.

Cordelia von Feuerbach
Rorona's childhood friend who works at the Adventurer's Guild in Arland. She is more mature now and also helps Totori by finding information on her mother's whereabouts. She still gets angry when people comment on her height (since she hasn't grown since the first game). She is playable as a DLC Character.

Guid Helmold
Totori's father. He is barely noticed by his daughters, having very little presence, and rarely shows emotion.

== Release ==
It was first released on PlayStation 3 in Japan on June 24, 2010 in a standard and premium edition. The premium edition comes in an oversized box with a limited edition crystal paperweight.

The PlayStation 3 version was localized by NIS America, and released on September 27, 2011 in North American territories, September 30, 2011 in Europe, and October 6, 2011 in Australia. In North America, a premium edition was also released. It came with the game, as well as a softcover artbook and partial soundtrack CD. For customers ordering from NIS America's online store, the premium edition also came with a double-sided poster.

On November 29, 2012, an enhanced port, titled Atelier Totori Plus: The Alchemist of Arland 2, was released in Japan for the PlayStation Vita. It was released in standard and premium versions. The premium set came with a crystal paperweight, but it has a different image and coloration from the previous paperweight. The main additional features to the port are the addition of a new post-game dungeon, along with several new boss enemies, new artwork, and new costumes for the player character. It also makes use of the Vita's back touchpad for navigating the world map.

The Vita version was localized in Europe and North America as Atelier Totori: The Adventurer of Arland Plus, and released on March 20, 2013 as a digital download on the PlayStation Network. It was given no official announcement, with the only clue being an R18+ rating that appeared on the Australian Classification Board's website. The PlayStation 3 version of Atelier Totori was rated PG, with the reason for the rating being "mild violence and infrequent coarse language," while the given reason for the R18+ rating was "references to sexual violence." In North America, the game received a T for Teen (ages 13+) rating while it received a B (ages 12+) rating in Japan, a 12 rating in South Korea, and a 12 rating in Europe. Its strict rating resulted in the creation of an internet meme captioned "High Impact Violence" that satirizes the Classification Board for labeling mildly sensual animation as having "high impact."

== Reception ==
Reception

Aggregate score
Aggregator	Score
Metacritic	PS3: 74/100; VITA: 79/100

Review scores
Publication	Score
Famitsu	VITA: 29/40
IGN	7.5/10
RPGamer	4.5/5

The game sold a total of 53,871 copies during its first week on sale in Japan and was the third best-selling game of the week, an increase of 10,000 copies from the first week sales of Atelier Rorona. The game has sold a total of 144,261 copies in Japan.

Reviews have been generally favorable; the game currently has an average score of 74 out of 100 on Metacritic.

RPGamer rated it a 4.5/5, complimenting its story in that "Atelier Totori is not an epic RPG like many other games in the genre try to be, but its allure allows it to stand tall as a bittersweet and emotionally charged experience that may require gamers to pull out the tissue box."

IGN gave the game a 7.5/10, praising the graphics and gameplay, but saying that while the core story is good, "the writing is mostly groan-worthy and the voice acting rarely does anything to save it either."

Famitsu gave the PS Vita version a review score of 29/40.
