= Atelier Yumia: The Alchemist of Memories & the Envisioned Land =

2025 video game by Gust Co. Ltd.

- Cover art of the game, Atelier Yumia: The Alchemist of Memories & the Envisioned Land
- Developer: Gust
- Publisher: Koei Tecmo
- Series: Atelier
- Engine: Katana Engine
- Platforms: Nintendo Switch; PlayStation 4 PlayStation 5 Xbox One; Xbox Series X/S; Microsoft Windows; Nintendo Switch 2
- Release: Switch, PS4, PS5, Xbox One, XSX/S, Win: WW: March 21, 2025; Nintendo Switch 2: WW: June 9, 2026
- Genre: Role-playing
- Mode: Single-player

Atelier Yumia: The Alchemist of Memories & the Envisioned Land (Note: Japanese: ユミアのアトリエ ～追憶の錬金術士と幻創の地～, Hepburn: Yumia no Atorie: Tsuioku no Renkinjutsushi to Genkaku no Shi) is a role-playing video game developed by Gust, and released for the PlayStation 4 and 5, Xbox One and Series, Nintendo Switch and Microsoft Windows in March 2025. It released on Nintendo Switch 2 in June 2026. It is the twenty-sixth main entry in the Atelier series and the first of the Memories series. A sequel titled Atelier Karia: The Night Kingdom & the Guide of Memories, is set for release in 2027.

== Gameplay ==
Atelier Yumia is a Japanese role-playing video game with an open world design. The game has a significant focus on item crafting, called alchemy, requiring the player to collect materials on the field, which can be later used for creating equipment. Exploration is hindered by dangerous zones, which can be "purified" by reaching certain landmarks within them. When the player character touches an enemy, the game enters the battle mode, in which party members move around a group of enemies and attack them in real time with skills and items.

== Plot ==
The game takes place during an expedition from the Eustella Republic into the former territory of the ancient Aladissian Empire, which thrived thanks to the art of alchemy, but fell due to an unknown cataclysm several centuries ago, leading its practice to be considered taboo. To clear the manabound areas that prevent the expedition from progressing, Erhard Boleman (Kenta Miyake) the leader of the expedition, enlists the help of Yumia Liessfeldt (Wakana Kuramochi), who practices the art despite its stigma, accompanied by an autonomous assistant called Flammi (Kana Asumi), created by her late mother, who also practiced alchemy in secret. Two young members of the expedition are assigned to accompany her, Viktor von Duerer (Makoto Furukawa), heir to the Duerer estate and his sister Isla (Kaori Maeda). Both are wary of Yumia at first, but eventually warm up as they get to know her better.

After a short encounter with a dragon-like mutant called Vesper (Takaya Kuroda), Viktor and Isla reveal to Yumia that Vesper was the responsible for an explosion of mana that destroyed their city, and Yumia confesses that her mother used her alchemy to sacrifice herself to clear up the mana and save the survivors. Three other members of the expedition later join Yumia's team: Rutger Arendt (Jun Fukuyama), an orphan treasure hunter raised by Erhard, Nina Friede (Mikako Komatsu), a veteran mercenary who later is revealed to be an homunculus created centuries ago by the empire, and Lenja (Yoshino Aoyama), a member of a demihuman race called "Welleks" who were the original creators of alchemy, but banned its practice after the fall of Aladiss. As the expedition pushes forward, they have occasional encounters with Vesper and two other mutants: Lili Borea (Yoko Hikasa), a woman transformed into a sheep-like mutant against her will, and Corleonis (Takehito Koyasu), a wolf-like mutant and alchemy researcher. The group eventually discovers that the three work for Basilius (Shin-ichiro Miki), the last emperor of Aladiss who was supposed to be dead centuries ago.

As the group defeats the three mutants, the expedition progresses until reaching the ruins of Aladiss Palace. They also discover that the mutants were helping Basilius, whose memories were transferred to several homunculi along the centuries to preserve his life, to gather the memories of the former inhabitants, technology and culture of Aladiss in a vain effort to restore it, after an accident caused the creation of the manabound areas and the collapse of the empire. Yumia and her party confronts Basilius, but Flammi sacrifices itself to protect Yumia, allowing her to destroy him for good. Having completed their expedition, the team part ways, with Yumia choosing to remain in Aladiss and study its secrets in order to restore the people's trust in alchemy and ensure the errors of the Aladiss Empire will never be repeated.

== Development and release ==
Atelier Yumia was developed by Gust. It was produced by Junzo Hosoi, the head of Gust. The story elements were based on those of Atelier Ryza 3: Alchemist of the End & the Secret Key; the development team reinterpreted the complex parts of the story and reconstructed the overall battle system with them. Antagonists were introduced in the narrative of Yumia after receiving complaints there were no villains in Ryza 3.

Atelier Yumia was announced in August 2024. It was released on 21 March 2025 for PlayStation 4, PlayStation 5, Xbox One, Xbox Series X/S, Nintendo Switch, and Windows. A Nintendo Switch 2 version released on 9 June 2026.

== Reception ==
Reception

Aggregate scores
| Aggregator | Score |
|---|---|
| Metacritic | PC: 81/100; PS5: 80/100; XSXS: 84/100 |
| OpenCritic | 77% recommend |

Review scores
| Publication | Score |
|---|---|
| Famitsu | 34/40 |
| Nintendo Life | 7/10 |
| RPGFan | 4/5 |

Upon its release, the game received "generally favorable" reviews on all platforms, according to review aggregator Metacritic. Fellow review aggregator OpenCritic assessed that the game received strong approval, being recommended by 77% of critics. In Japan, four critics from Famitsu gave the game a total score of 34 out of 40.

Within its first week, the game sold over 300,000 copies, making it the fastest-selling game in the franchise.
