= Blue Reflection =

2017 role-playing video game and its adaptation

- Developer: Gust
- Publisher: Koei Tecmo
- Director: Azusa Takahashi
- Producer: Junzo Hosoi
- Designer: Azusa Takahashi
- Programmer: Katsuto Kawauchi
- Artist: Mel Kishida
- Writers: Tetsu Shirakawa; Yurina Komuraski; Shohei Sakai
- Composer: Hayato Asano
- Series: Beautiful Girls Festival (final instalment); Blue Reflection (first instalment)
- Platforms: PlayStation 4, PlayStation 5, PlayStation Vita, Microsoft Windows, Nintendo Switch, Nintendo Switch 2
- Release: PlayStation 4: JP: March 30, 2017; NA: September 26, 2017; EU: September 29, 2017; PlayStation Vita: JP: March 30, 2017; Microsoft Windows: NA: September 26, 2017; EU: September 29, 2017; PlayStation 5, Switch, Switch 2: WW: July 30, 2026
- Genre: Role-playing

Blue Reflection (Note: Known in Japan as Blue Reflection: Maboroshi ni Mau Shōjo no Ken (Japanese: BLUE REFLECTION(ブルーリフレクション) 幻に舞う少女の剣; lit. "Blue Reflection: Sword of the Girl Who Dances in Illusions")) is a role-playing video game developed by Gust. It was published by Koei Tecmo in March 2017 in Japan for the PlayStation 4 and PlayStation Vita, and was released in September 2017 in North America and Europe for the PlayStation 4 and Microsoft Windows. The player takes the role of Hinako Shirai, a ballet dancer who due to a knee injury no longer can dance, but who is given magical power allowing her to fight and move freely. The game follows a day cycle, which sees Hinako attend school and spend time with classmates, and visit another world where she fights monsters in a turn-based battle system. By becoming close friends with her classmates, Hinako can use support abilities from them in battle.

The game is the final game in Gust's "Beautiful Girls Festival" project, which also includes Atelier Firis and Nights of Azure 2. It was produced by Junzo Hosoi, organized by Keiichi Sigsawa, Yūsaku Igarashi, and Kouji Natsumi, and supervised by Mel Kishida, who also designed the characters. It is intended to depict female youth in a true-to-life way, focusing on the concepts of interaction between girls and personal growth through sharing experiences with people.

An anime television series spin-off made by J.C.Staff named Blue Reflection Ray aired from April to September 2021.

A sequel, Blue Reflection: Second Light, was released for PS4, Switch, and Microsoft Windows in Japan in October 2021 and worldwide in November 2021. Blue Reflection Sun, a Japanese exclusive mobile game, released in February 2023.

A four game bundle titled Blue Reflection Quartet released on PlayStation 5, Microsoft Windows, Nintendo Switch, and Nintendo Switch 2 on July 30, 2026. This includes remastered versions of Blue Reflection and Blue Reflection: Second Light, alongside two new games — a console remake of the mobile game Blue Reflection: Sun and a video game adaption of the anime Blue Reflection Ray. The games will be digital only in English.

== Gameplay ==
The player controls a party of three characters in turn-based battles against monsters.

Blue Reflection is a role-playing game, which follows a day cycle: in the morning, the player character goes to school, and sometimes meets other students on the way. Scenes occur during school, some of which involve questions from the player character's classmates, which affect their relationship to the player character depending on the player's answers; close friendships with characters enables additional support benefits during battles, and affects their attitudes towards the player during story sequences. The player can also interact with characters by messaging them through an in-game mobile app, which also allows the player to view character profiles and play minigames. After school, the player is allowed to move around freely; they can choose between various activities, including spending time with the classmates and creating items. After the player is done for the day, their character returns home, and the day ends with her going to sleep.

The player can also try to solve classmates' problems during their free time. The cause for their problems sometimes reside outside the real world, in the Other World; by visiting it, the player can seek out emotion fragments, which cause defects in the real world. After finding the fragments and overcoming challenges in the Other World, the player learns about the thoughts of the character they're helping, is returned to the real world, and receives reward items and fragments. Different missions include different rewards; some give the player growth points, which the player can invest in their characters' attack, defense, support, or technic stats, making them stronger and teaching them new skills. The fragments the player acquires can be equipped to the characters' skills, giving the skills additional effects. In addition to the rewards, some missions give the player evaluation points; the story progresses when the player has acquired enough of them.

While exploring the Other World, the player sometimes encounters monsters, leading to a battle, wherein the three characters in the player's party fight through a turn-based system. The turn order is displayed through character icons that move across a bar, with characters at the center of the bar allowed to perform an action; by preemptively attacking monsters in the Other World, the player's party can start the battle at an advantage. Actions are chosen through a menu, with commands such as "attack" and "support". If certain requirements are met, the player can perform cooperative moves, where the powers of the characters in their party are linked, resulting in a much more effective attack than regular attacks. During each turn, the player can choose to charge up their ether; they can consume this when recovering or guarding to improve those actions' effects. Unlike other commands, these two are done in real-time before the player characters or the enemies perform an action, by pressing a button at the right time. In the real world, the player sometimes encounters powerful enemies called "Pure Breeds", which are capable of defeating a party member in one blow. During these battles, the player can receive support from the player character's schoolmates, who all have different support abilities; to do this, the player needs to choose up to four support characters per party member while outside combat. The player's "guard" action also changes during these battles, to "reflect", through which the player can reflect the Pure Breeds' attacks against themselves, dealing a large amount of damage.

== Synopsis ==
=== Setting and characters ===
Blue Reflection is set in the Hoshinomiya Girls High School in modern-day Japan, in the middle of summer. The player takes the role of Hinako Shirai, a ballet dancer who injured her knee one year prior to the beginning of the game, and has been unable to dance since then. After meeting with sisters Yuzuki and Lime Shijou, she is given the power to fight as a magical girl referred to as a "Reflector", allowing her to move freely.

== Development and release ==
The game was developed by Koei Tecmo's division Gust under supervision by Mel Kishida, who additionally was in charge of character designs. It was produced by Junzo Hosoi, and organized by Keiichi Sigsawa, Yūsaku Igarashi, and Kouji Natsumi. The developers describe the game as a "heroic RPG" that serves as a "life-sized" portrayal of youth for women, themed around "human essence" and connections between people. The central concept is interaction between women, with the player character growing as a person through experiences she shares with her classmates, such as the beginnings and endings of friendships. Hosoi cited Hana & Alice, Magic Knight Rayearth and Sailor Moon as influences for the game. The game was announced through Famitsu and Dengeki PlayStation in August 2016, as the final game in Gust's three-game "Beautiful Girls Festival" project, which also includes Atelier Firis and Nights of Azure 2. At the time of the announcement, development was 30% complete.

Blue Reflection was published by Koei Tecmo in Japan on March 30, 2017, for the PlayStation 4 and PlayStation Vita. It was made available in a standard, a premium, and a special collection edition: the premium edition includes the game's soundtrack, illustrations, a school calendar, a poster, and an in-game costume; the special collection edition includes all the items from the premium addition, along with sixteen further posters. People who pre-ordered the game were also given additional digital content. Koei Tecmo also plans to release the game in North America on September 26, 2017 and in Europe on September 29, 2017, for the PlayStation 4 and Microsoft Windows. Western pre-orders included an in-game swimsuit and a costume based on the title character from Atelier Rorona; additional pre-order bonuses were included with purchases from certain retailers.

The game features a collaboration with Final Fantasy XV in the form of in-game clothing based on the Final Fantasy XV characters Aranea Highwind and Cindy Aurum, and Blue Reflection characters appeared in an April 2017 event in the game Kai-ri-Sei Million Arthur.

In November 2017, Hosoi and Kishida said that they were intending to develop a sequel to Blue Reflection and turn it into a series, but noted that fan feedback was important and that they were not yet certain if a sequel would get made. An anime spinoff was announced in February 2021, titled Blue Reflection Ray, and in March 2021, two new games were formally announced, a console and PC sequel, Blue Reflection: Second Light and a mobile game, Blue Reflection: Sun; the latter was released on February 21, 2023.

== Reception ==
Reception

Aggregate score
| Aggregator | Score |
|---|---|
| Metacritic | PC: 61/100; PS4: 66/100 |

Review scores
| Publication | Score |
|---|---|
| Famitsu | 32/40 |
| IGN Japan | 7.4/10 |

=== Pre-release ===
Cory Arnold of Destructoid described the game as looking "crazy fun", likening it to a mix between Persona, Atelier, Final Fantasy X, and Ni no Kuni, and urged people to discard any "anime prejudices" they might hold; and Kimberley Wallace from Game Informer thought it looked "really cool".

=== Post-release ===
The game was met by "mixed or average reviews", according to the review aggregator Metacritic.
