= Atelier (video game series) =

- There is no unified logo for the series; this logo was used in Atelier Rorona.
- Genre: Role-playing
- Developer: Gust, Akatsuki Games, Team Ninja Spinoff developers: Amazing, Banpresto, Bothtec, E3 Staff, GMO Mobile, Hyde, Idea Factory, Otomate, Rideon Japan, Tose
- Publishers: Koei Tecmo Previous: JP: Gust, Banpresto (GBA), E3 Staff (WSC), Idea Factory (Elkrone), Imadio (Sat, Win), Kool Kizz (DC); NA/EU: NIS America (PS2/PS3/PSP); EU: Koei (PS2); AU: THQ (PS2)
- Platform: PlayStation, PlayStation 2, PlayStation 3, PlayStation 4, PlayStation 5, PlayStation Vita, Nintendo Switch, Nintendo Switch 2, Microsoft Windows, Xbox One, Xbox Series X/S, Android, iOS Spinoff and port only platforms: WonderSwan Color, PlayStation Portable, Game Boy Color, Game Boy Advance, Nintendo DS, Nintendo 3DS, Dreamcast, Sega Saturn, Mobile phone
- First release: Atelier Marie: The Alchemist of Salburg; May 23, 1997
- Latest release: Atelier Resleriana: The Red Alchemist & the White Guardian; September 26, 2025

The Atelier series (Note: Japanese: アトリエシリーズ, Hepburn: Atorie Shirīzu) is a franchise of bishoujo role-playing video games developed by Gust Corporation since 1997, originally being developed for the PlayStation line of consoles before main entries began to see consistent releases for Microsoft Windows since 2015 and the Nintendo Switch since 2017. New games are released in the series on an almost yearly basis. The series was solely released in Japan and Asia until 2004, after which the series has seen worldwide releases.

The franchise centers around the concept of an atelier specialising in alchemy; the gameplay involves finding, collecting, and combining items in recipes to create better items, which allows the player to advance further in the game. Like many JRPGs, the franchise is mostly an anthology of multiple subseries with their own self-contained stories and heroines, sometimes having a completely different continuity in a different subseries. Most of the games focus on female characters, which used to be somewhat rare among Japanese role-playing franchises around the time of the series debut.

Several manga and two anime adaptations of titles from the series have been created so far. As of August 2023, the series has shipped more than 7.5 million units worldwide.

== Common elements ==
Alchemy is the distinguishing theme of the Atelier series. Players control the game's character, roaming the game world to collect objects to use in alchemy recipes to create new objects, including cooking ingredients, recovery items, tools, weapons, armor, and accessories. Synthesized objects are commonly required in order to create more powerful or potent objects through alchemy. Many of the games feature a method of transferring properties of one item from the recipe to the synthesized item. Recipes also often allow the substitution of items, which can either lend better properties to the final synthesized item, or can lead to the character thinking of a completely new recipe. The games generally feature a turn-based combat system, in which the items made through alchemy come into play, either to boost the character's abilities, or for offensive, defensive, or support items.

The games' stories are typically light-hearted and humorous, bordering on iyashikei, with often deriving conflict from a source other than an antagonist, and the player ends up with a large group of characters to explore the world with.

In many earlier games in the series, the player are given a limited amount of in-game days to accomplish one or more main objectives and actions like gathering items, traveling or synthesizing spend a portion of that time. Failure to accomplish the game's main tasks in time may cause the game to end abruptly or lead to a bad ending, though these time limits tend to be rather lenient. The first entry in the "Mysterious" Atelier subseries Atelier Sophie does away with the time limit system, but the second entry Atelier Firis has a time limit for completing the game's first major story objective, after which players can play at their leisure. The third entry in the Mysterious subseries, Atelier Lydie & Suelle, only briefly included a time limit for one objective in the middle of the game. Starting from Atelier Lulua, the time limit system was completely removed from following main installments of the series, with future remakes such as that of Atelier Marie making time limits an optional, pre-game "difficulty" setting that can be activated or removed entirely.

== Games ==
There have been 28 main games in the Atelier franchise, which are subdivided into 10 sub-series, each usually connected by a single keyword in their titles. There are three games in the Salburg series, two games in Gramnad series, three games in the Iris series, two games in the Mana-Khemia series, four games in the Arland series, three games in the Dusk series, four games in the Mysterious series, three games in the Secret series, one entry in the ongoing Memories series, and two entries in the Resleriana series, although Forgotten Alchemy & the Liberator of Polar Night is a mobile gacha game crossover.

=== Debut Versions ===
| Name | Series | Platform | Japanese release date | North American release date^{[B]} | European release date | Australian release date |
|---|---|---|---|---|---|---|
| Atelier Marie: The Alchemist of Salburg | Salburg | PlayStation | 1997-05-23 | — | — | — |
| Atelier Elie: The Alchemist of Salburg 2 | Salburg | PlayStation | 1998-12-17 | — | — | — |
| Atelier Lilie: The Alchemist of Salburg 3 | Salburg | PlayStation 2 | 2001-06-21 | — | — | — |
| Atelier Judie: The Alchemist of Gramnad | Gramnad | PlayStation 2 | 2002-06-27 | — | — | — |
| Atelier Viorate: The Alchemist of Gramnad 2^{[A]} | Gramnad | PlayStation 2 | 2003-06-26 | — | — | — |
| Atelier Iris: Eternal Mana | Iris | PlayStation 2 | 2004-05-27 | 2005-06-28 | 2006-03-17 | 2006-03-23 |
| Atelier Iris 2: The Azoth of Destiny | Iris | PlayStation 2 | 2005-05-26 | 2006-04-25 | 2006-09-29 | 2006-10-12 |
| Atelier Iris 3: Grand Phantasm | Iris | PlayStation 2 | 2006-06-29 | 2007-05-29 | 2007-08-03 | 2007-07-26 |
| Mana Khemia: Alchemists of Al-Revis | Mana | PlayStation 2 | 2007-06-21 | 2008-03-31 | 2009-03-27 | — |
| Mana Khemia 2: Fall of Alchemy | Mana | PlayStation 2 | 2008-05-29 | 2009-08-25 | — | — |
| Atelier Rorona: The Alchemist of Arland | Arland | PlayStation 3 | 2009-06-25 | 2010-09-28 | 2010-10-22 | 2010-10-28 |
| Atelier Totori: The Adventurer of Arland | Arland | PlayStation 3 | 2010-06-24 | 2011-09-27 | 2011-09-30 | 2011-10-06 |
| Atelier Meruru: The Apprentice of Arland | Arland | PlayStation 3 | 2011-06-23 | 2012-05-29 | 2012-05-25 | 2012-05-31 |
| Atelier Ayesha: The Alchemist of Dusk | Dusk | PlayStation 3 | 2012-06-28 | 2013-03-05 | 2013-03-08 | 2013-03-07 |
| Atelier Escha & Logy: Alchemists of the Dusk Sky | Dusk | PlayStation 3 | 2013-06-27 | 2014-03-11 | 2014-03-07 | 2014-03-06 |
| Atelier Shallie: Alchemists of the Dusk Sea | Dusk | PlayStation 3 | 2014-07-17 | 2015-03-10 | 2015-03-13 | 2015-03-20 |
| Atelier Sophie: The Alchemist of the Mysterious Book | Mysterious | PlayStation 3 PlayStation 4 PlayStation Vita; Microsoft Windows | 2015-11-19 | 2016-06-07 | 2016-06-10 | 2016-06-10 |
| Atelier Firis: The Alchemist and the Mysterious Journey | Mysterious | PlayStation 4 PlayStation Vita; Microsoft Windows | 2016-11-02 | 2017-03-07 | 2017-03-10 | 2017-03-10 |
| Atelier Lydie & Suelle: The Alchemists and the Mysterious Paintings | Mysterious | Nintendo Switch; PlayStation 4 PlayStation Vita; Microsoft Windows | 2017-12-21 | 2018-03-27 | 2018-03-30 | 2018-03-27 |
| Atelier Lulua: The Scion of Arland | Arland | Nintendo Switch; PlayStation 4 Microsoft Windows | 2019-03-20 | 2019-05-21 | 2019-05-24 | 2019-05-24 |
| Atelier Ryza: Ever Darkness & the Secret Hideout | Secret | Nintendo Switch; PlayStation 4 Microsoft Windows | 2019-09-26 | 2019-10-29 | 2019-11-01 | 2019-11-01 |
| Atelier Ryza 2: Lost Legends & the Secret Fairy | Secret | Nintendo Switch; PlayStation 4 PlayStation 5 Microsoft Windows | 2020-12-03 | 2021-01-26 | 2021-01-29 | 2021-01-29 |
| Atelier Sophie 2: The Alchemist of the Mysterious Dream | Mysterious | Nintendo Switch; PlayStation 4 Microsoft Windows | 2022-02-24 | 2022-02-25 | 2022-02-25 | 2022-02-25 |
| Atelier Ryza 3: Alchemist of the End & the Secret Key | Secret | Nintendo Switch; PlayStation 4 PlayStation 5 Microsoft Windows | 2023-03-23 | 2023-03-24 | 2023-03-24 | 2023-03-24 |
| Atelier Resleriana: Forgotten Alchemy & the Liberator of Polar Night | Resleriana | iOS; Android; Microsoft Windows | 2023-09-23 | 2024-01-25 | 2024-01-25 | 2024-01-25 |
| Atelier Yumia: The Alchemist of Memories & the Envisioned Land | Memories | Microsoft Windows; PlayStation 4 PlayStation 5 Xbox One; Xbox Series X/S; Nintendo Switch | 2025-03-21 | 2025-03-21 | 2025-03-21 | 2025-03-21 |
| Atelier Resleriana: The Red Alchemist & the White Guardian | Resleriana | Microsoft Windows; PlayStation 4 PlayStation 5 Nintendo Switch | 2025-9-26 | 2025-9-26 | 2025-9-26 | 2025-9-26 |
| Atelier Karia: The Night Kingdom & the Guide of Memories | Memories | Microsoft Windows; PlayStation 5 Xbox Series X/S; Nintendo Switch 2 | 2027-02-25 | 2027-02-25 | 2027-02-25 | 2027-02-25 |

=== Side games ===
In addition to the main games, several side games have been released.

| Name | Series | Platform | Japanese release date | North American release date^{[B]} | European release date | Australian release date |
|---|---|---|---|---|---|---|
| Atelier Marie GB | Salburg | Game Boy Color | 2000-01-08 | — | — | — |
| Atelier Elie GB | Salburg | Game Boy Color | 2000-01-08 | — | — | — |
| Marie & Elie: Atelier Pair | Salburg | WonderSwan Color | 2001-10-25 | — | — | — |
| Hermina and Culus: Atelier Lilie Another Story | Salburg | PlayStation 2 | 2001-12-20 | — | — | — |
| Atelier Marie, Elie & Anis: Message on the Gentle Breeze | Salburg | Game Boy Advance | 2003-01-24 | — | — | — |
| Marie's Charajan | Salburg | DoCoMo 504i and 504iS (i-mode) | 2003-03-10 | — | — | — |
| Atelier Marie: Puzzle Workshop | Salburg | EZ App (BREW) | 2006-11-02 | — | — | |
| Atelier Elie: Puzzle Workshop | Salburg | EZ App (BREW) | 2006-11-02 | — | — | |
| Iris no Atelier: Eternal Mana 2 After Episode | Iris | SoftBank 3G, FOMA90x Series | 2006-12-01 | — | — | — |
| Atelier Lise: The Alchemist of Orde | DS | Nintendo DS | 2007-04-19 | — | — | — |
| Atelier Annie: Alchemists of Sera Island | DS | Nintendo DS | 2009-03-12 | 2009-10-27 | — | — |
| Atelier Lina: The Alchemist of Strahl | DS | Nintendo DS | 2009-12-22 | — | — | — |
| Atelier Marie–Elie: The Alchemists of Salburg | Salburg | GREE | 2012-02-02 | — | — | — |
| Atelier Elkrone: Dear for Otomate | — | PlayStation Portable | 2012-04-12 | — | — | — |
| Atelier Quest Board | — | iOS; Android | 2014-10-17 | — | — | — |
| Atelier Online: Alchemists of Bressisle | — | iOS; Android | 2018-10-03 | 2021-07-08 | 2021-07-08 | 2021-07-08 |
| Nelke & the Legendary Alchemists: Ateliers of the New World | — | Nintendo Switch; PlayStation 4 PlayStation Vita; Microsoft Windows | 2019-01-31 | 2019-03-26 | 2019-03-29 | — |

=== Remakes and ports ===
Several of the series' titles were remade or ported, mostly for portable devices.

| Name | Series | Platform | Japanese release date | North American release date^{[B]} | European release date | Australian release date |
|---|---|---|---|---|---|---|
| Atelier Marie: The Alchemist of Salburg Ver.1.3 | Salburg | Sega Saturn | 1997-12-11 | — | — | — |
| Atelier Marie Plus: The Alchemist of Salburg | Salburg | PlayStation | 1998-06-04 | — | — | — |
| Atelier Marie: The Alchemist of Salburg | Salburg | Microsoft Windows | 2000-04-28 | — | — | — |
| Atelier Elie: The Alchemist of Salburg 2 | Salburg | Microsoft Windows | 2000-04-28 | — | — | — |
| Atelier Marie & Elie: The Alchemists of Salburg 1–2 | Salburg | Dreamcast | 2001-11-15 | — | — | — |
| Atelier Lilie Plus: The Alchemist of Salburg 3 | Salburg | PlayStation 2 | 2002-04-04 | — | — | — |
| i Atelier Marie: The Alchemist of Salburg | Salburg | DoCoMo 504i, 504iS, 505i, 505iS and FOMA (i-mode) | 2003-12-15 | — | — | — |
| Atelier Marie | Salburg | au BREW | 2003 | — | — | — |
| Atelier Elie | Salburg | au BREW | 2003 | — | — | — |
| Atelier Lilie | Salburg | au BREW | 2003 | — | — | — |
| Atelier Marie | Salburg | DoCoMO 504i, 505i, FOMA2071, 2102V series | 2004-06-03 | — | — | — |
| Atelier Marie+Elie: The Alchemists of Salburg 1–2 | Salburg | PlayStation 2 | 2005-10-27 | — | — | — |
| Atelier Marie | Salburg | Vodafone V703SH, V703SHf, V802SH, V804SH, V902SH, V903SH, V803T, V902T, V903T, V904T, 804SS, 804N | 2006-04-03 | — | — | — |
| Atelier Marie | Salburg | S! App | 2006-06-03 | — | — | — |
| Atelier Elie: Puzzle Workshop | Salburg | S! App | 2006-11-02 | — | — | |
| Atelier Elie | Salburg | S! App | 2007-04- | — | — | — |
| Mana Khemia: Student Alliance | Mana | PlayStation Portable | 2008-09-25 | 2009-03-10 | 2009-03-27 | — |
| Mana Khemia 2: Fall of Alchemy Portable Plus | Mana | PlayStation Portable | 2009-10-01 | — | — | — |
| Atelier Judie: The Alchemist of Gramnad: Imprisoned Guardian | Gramnad | PlayStation Portable | 2010-04-08 | — | — | — |
| Atelier Viorate: The Alchemist of Gramnad 2: The Memories of Ultramarine^{[A]} | Gramnad | PlayStation Portable | 2011-02-03 | — | — | — |
| Atelier Totori Plus: The Adventurer of Arland | Arland | PlayStation Vita | 2012-11-29 | 2013-03-19 | 2013-03-20 | 2013-03-20 |
| Atelier Meruru Plus: The Apprentice of Arland | Arland | PlayStation Vita | 2013-03-20 | 2013-09-03 | 2013-09-04 | 2013-09-04 |
| Atelier Rorona Plus: The Alchemist of Arland | Arland | PlayStation 3 PlayStation Vita | 2013-11-21 | 2014-06-24 | 2014-06-20 | 2014-06-19 |
| Atelier Rorona Plus: The Alchemist of Arland DX | Arland | Microsoft Windows; Nintendo Switch | 2018-09-20 | 2018-12-04 | 2018-12-04 | 2018-12-04 |
| Atelier Ayesha Plus: The Alchemist of Dusk | Dusk | PlayStation Vita | 2014-03-27 | 2015-01-13 | 2015-02-11 | 2015-02-11 |
| Atelier Ayesha Plus: The Alchemist of Dusk DX | Dusk | Microsoft Windows; Nintendo Switch | 2019-12-25 | 2020-01-14 | 2020-01-14 | 2020-01-14 |
| Atelier Escha & Logy Plus: Alchemists of the Dusk Sky | Dusk | PlayStation Vita | 2015-01-22 | 2016-01-19 | 2016-01-20 | 2016-01-20 |
| Atelier Escha & Logy Plus: Alchemists of the Dusk Sky DX | Dusk | Microsoft Windows; Nintendo Switch | 2019-12-25 | 2020-01-14 | 2020-01-14 | 2020-01-14 |
| The Arland Atelier Trilogy | Arland | PlayStation 3 | — | 2015-10-13 | 2015-03-06 | — |
| New Atelier Rorona: The Alchemist of Arland | Arland | Nintendo 3DS | 2015-06-04 | — | — | — |
| Atelier Shallie Plus: Alchemists of the Dusk Sea | Dusk | PlayStation Vita | 2016-03-03 | 2017-01-17 | 2017-01-20 | — |
| Atelier Marie Plus: The Alchemist of Salburg | Salburg | Android, iOS | 2018-02-28 | — | — | — |
| Atelier Arland Series Deluxe Pack | Arland | Nintendo Switch; PlayStation 4 Microsoft Windows | 2018-09-20 | 2018-12-04 | 2018-12-04 | 2018-12-04 |
| Atelier Dusk Series Deluxe Pack | Dusk | Nintendo Switch; PlayStation 4 Microsoft Windows | 2019-12-25 | 2020-01-14 | 2020-01-14 | 2020-01-14 |
| Atelier Mysterious Trilogy Deluxe Pack | Mysterious | Nintendo Switch; PlayStation 4 Microsoft Windows | 2021-04-22 | 2021-04-22 | 2021-04-22 | 2021-04-22 |
| Atelier Marie Remake: The Alchemist of Salburg | Salburg | Nintendo Switch; PlayStation 4 PlayStation 5 Microsoft Windows | 2023-07-13 | 2023-07-13 | 2023-07-13 | 2023-07-13 |
| Atelier Ryza Secret Trilogy Deluxe Pack | Secret | Nintendo Switch; Nintendo Switch 2 PlayStation 4 PlayStation 5 Microsoft Windows | 2025-11-13 | 2025-11-13 | 2025-11-13 | 2025-11-13 |
| Atelier Yumia: The Alchemist of Memories & the Envisioned Land - Nintendo Switch 2 Edition | Memories | Nintendo Switch 2 | 2026-06-09 | 2026-06-09 | 2026-06-09 | 2026-06-09 |

- A Gust's official spelling is Viorate, as seen on the manga adaptation's and the original soundtrack's cover.
- B Release dates are one day earlier than listed here for specifically the North American Microsoft Windows releases from 2022 onwards. This is due to time zone considerations, as a single worldwide Windows version is released via Steam. Console releases follow the listed dates.

==== External Crossovers ====
- Marie from Atelier Marie: The Alchemist of Salburg, and Liliane Vehlendorf, Rozeluxe Meitzen, Whim and Rewrich Wallach from Mana Khemia 2 joins many other out of game characters in 2008's Cross Edge.
- Viorate from Atelier Viorate: The Alchemist of Gramnad 2 appears in the 2009 company-collaboration RPG, Trinity Universe released in the United States by NIS America (as "Violet").
- Company-collaborative 2010 RPG Hyperdimension Neptunia's in-game character Gust displays Atelier characters in numerous special attacks in the game. Gust also has a costume that directly resembles a costume from Atelier. She also has a hobby of making items out of strange ingredients, a play on the Atelier series' focus on alchemy. She returns for the reboot as an important story character but was later replaced by Broccoli in the remake. She also appeared in the Megami Tsuuhin manga on some chapters.
- As of January 2015, Koei Tecmo's My Gamecity Card Collection browser collectible card game features more than 170 Atelier-themed cards.
- Astrid Zexis, Rorolina Frixell, Cordelia von Feuerbach, Lionela Heinze and Pamela Ibis, from Atelier Rorona: The Alchemist of Arland appeared in 2013's Kaku-san-sei Million Arthur.
- Sterkenburg Cranach from Atelier Arland series, appeared in Warriors Orochi 3 Ultimate, sporting his Meruru appearance and his Rorona appearance as a downloadable content (DLC) costume.
- 2013's Dynasty Warriors 8: Xtreme Legends has a Rorolina Frixelle-themed (from Atelier Rorona) costume for playable character Wang Yuanji.
- 2014's Deception IV: Blood Ties has a costume based on Totooria Helmold, from Atelier Totori.
- Chain Chronicle's October 2015 update added Rorolina Frixell and Cordelia von Feuerbach from Atelier Rorona, Merurulince Rede Arls, Keina Swaya and Sterkenburg Cranach from Atelier Meruru, and Totooria Helmold and Mimi Houllier von Schwarzlang from Atelier Totori, as playable characters.
- In 2016, costumes based on various games by Gust, including the Atelier series, appeared as DLC in Dead or Alive 5 Last Round.
- In 2017, Sophie Neuenmuller and Plachta appeared in Warriors All-Stars as playable characters.
- In 2017, costumes based on Rorolina Frixell and Hom from Atelier Rorona appeared as DLC in Gust's game Blue Reflection.
- In 2018, costumes of Lydie and Suelle Malen appeared in Everybody's Golf as part of a collaboration. In return, costumes based on the game appear for free for an entire year exclusive to the PlayStation 4 version of Atelier Lydie & Suelle: The Alchemists and the Mysterious Paintings.
- Various Atelier costumes return as DLC in Dead or Alive 6 as part of the "Gust Mashup Costume Set". A separate DLC pack was released titled "Atelier Ryza Mashup Set" that is based on the three female playable characters in Atelier Ryza: Ever Darkness & the Secret Hideout.
- In 2024, costumes based on the Atelier Ryza series appeared in Fairy Tail 2 as a part of the "Digital Deluxe" edition. It also includes "Atelier Lucy", an additional feature based on the series.
- In 2025, Sophie, Ryza, and Yumia appeared in Warriors: Abyss as playable characters.

== Manga and anime adaptations ==
Atelier Marie and Elie - The Alchemist of Salburg by Yoshihiko Ochi is a five volume manga adaptation first published in Japan by Enterbrain, published in German by Egmont, published in French by Ki-oon, and four of the volumes were published in English by Tokyopop. The series was later re-edited and re-released in two tankōbon volumes on July 25, 2007. The manga later received a sequel titled Marie to Elie Atelier: Salburg no Renkinjutsushi Second Season, as of February 2018 Enterbrain released eight tankōbon volumes. In 2005 Enterbrain also released a one-shot manga titled Viorate no Atelier: Kiteretsu Muraokoshi.

Atelier Escha & Logy: Alchemists of the Dusk Sky was adapted into a manga series by Chako Abeno. It features some arrangements to the story in order to let supporting characters play a bigger role. As of January 2015 two tankōbon volumes was released. It has also been adapted into a 12-episode television anime series, produced by Studio Gokumi and directed by Yoshiaki Iwasaki, aired on Tokyo MX between April 10, 2014, and 26 June 2014.

A manga adaptation of Atelier Ryza: Ever Darkness & the Secret Hideout, written and illustrated by Riichu started serialization in Shūkan Famitsū on September 17, 2020.

A manga adaptation of Atelier Rorona also exists.

An anime television series adaptation of Atelier Ryza: Ever Darkness & the Secret Hideout was announced on March 19, 2023. It is animated by Liden Films and directed by Ema Yuzuhira, with Yashichiro Takahashi and Kazuki Yanagawa reprising their roles from the game as script writer and composer. The anime series aired from July 2 to September 17, 2023, on Tokyo MX and other networks.

== See also ==
- Quintet (company)
- Chronos Materia
