= Dragon Sword and Wind Child =

1988 book by Noriko Ogiwara

- First edition (Japanese)
- Author: Noriko Ogiwara
- Cover artist: Dan Burr
- Language: Japanese
- Series: The Jade Trilogy
- Genre: Fantasy novel
- Publisher: Farrar, Straus and Giroux (first edition); Viz Media (second edition)
- Publication date: 1988
- Publication place: Japan
- Media type: Print (Hardback & Paperback)
- Pages: 340
- ISBN: 0-374-30466-1
- OCLC: 25833413
- LC Class: PZ7.O344 Dr 1993
- Preceded by: n/a
- Followed by: Mirror Sword and Shadow Prince (Hakuchou Iden)

Dragon Sword and Wind Child (ISBN 0-374-30466-1) is the first book of award-winning fantasy writer Noriko Ogiwara. The book, originally written in Japanese in 1988 as: Sorairo Magatama (空色勾玉 Sky-Colored Jade; see magatama), won her several awards for children's literature and was later translated into English by Cathy Hirano in 1993 as Dragon Sword and Wind Child.

Viz Media LLC, a publisher of English-translated manga, republished the novel in English in October 2007.

Ogiwara wrote two sequels, Hakuchou Iden (白鳥異伝 Swan's Strange Legend) and Usubeni Tennyo (薄紅天女 Pink Nymph). Until 2011, these sequels have only been published in Japanese; in May 2011, Viz published an English translation of Hakuchou Iden as Mirror Sword and Shadow Prince. Together, the three books are known as "The Jade Trilogy".

== Plot summary ==
Saya is a young maiden who was adopted by an elderly couple who found her in the forest when she was an infant and raised to worship and revere the God of Light and his two immortal children, the passionate and fierce Princess Teruhi and the subdued and melancholic Prince Tsukishiro. As she comes of age, she catches the eye of Prince Tsukishiro and the people of Darkness, those who continue to reincarnate and do not fear death.

Tsukishiro, enchanted by Saya's beauty, invites her to become one of his handmaidens at the Palace of Light where he and his sister reside. Before she leaves, she discovers from the People of Darkness that she is latest reincarnation of the Water Maiden, the Princess of the People of Darkness and a priestess capable of stilling the Dragon Sword, a weapon that contains the rage of the Fire God when he was killed by his father, the God of Light, for burning his mother, the Goddess of Darkness, to death. The Dragon Sword and the Water Maiden are linked and the sword is the only weapon which can slay a Child of Light. It is this aspect, Saya discovers, of her that intrigues and attracts Tsukishiro and infuriates and causes Teruhi to despise her since she resembles her previous reincarnation, the Princess Sayura.

Saya, despite having worshiped the Light all her life and looked down on the People of Darkness, finds that she cannot escape her destiny as the Water Maiden, symbolized the magatama shaped jewel that was clutched in her hand when she was born. She ends up escaping the Palace of Light with the third Child of Light, Chihaya, the effeminate younger brother of Teruhi and Tsukishiro who was stilled by Teruhi to act as a surrogate Water Maiden for the stolen Dragon Sword and revealed to be the Wind Child, the only entity capable of wielding the Dragon Sword.

Together, they join the People of Darkness to stop the fanatical and merciless Teruhi and the indifferent Tsukishiro from destroying the gods of nature and the People of Darkness.

== Book covers ==
There are several different covers for the novel. When the book was first published in Japan in 1988, it was given a traditional Japanese painting for the cover. When it was first translated into English in 1993 by Cathy Hirano, it was given a drawing of a young Asian girl wearing traditional Japanese clothing holding a long sword, with a traditional Japanese background (similar to the traditional atmosphere of the Japan of the Warring States period). Editors felt that the change was necessary as the original cover would not be interesting to western readers. When the Japanese edition was reissued by another publisher in Japan, the cover was changed again because it was felt that the original cover was not going to be popular with young readers.

Dragon Sword and Wind Child, the 1993 English cover.

== Availability ==
English-language copies of Dragon Sword and Wind Child were considered rare before Viz Media republished it in the fall of 2007. Japanese copies are much easier to find, due to its popularity in Japan. Copies of Sky-blue Jade and its two sequels are available in Japanese and remain in print.
