= Blue Reflection Ray =

Japanese anime television series

- Created by: Koei Tecmo Games
- Anime television series
- Directed by: Risako Yoshida
- Produced by: Shūichi Takashino; Hiroyuki Aoi
- Written by: Akiko Waba; Seishi Minakami; Yukie Sugiwara
- Music by: Daisuke Shinoda
- Studio: J.C.Staff
- Licensed by: Crunchyroll (streaming); SEA: Mighty Media
- Original network: JNN (MBS, TBS, BS-TBS)
- Original run: April 10, 2021 – September 25, 2021
- Episodes: 24
- Video game
- Developer: Gust
- Publisher: Koei Tecmo
- Genre: Role-playing
- Platform: PlayStation 5, Microsoft Windows, Nintendo Switch, Nintendo Switch 2
- Released: July 30, 2026

Blue Reflection Ray is a Japanese anime television series and the spin-off of the video game, Blue Reflection. It serves as a prelude to the 2021 game, Blue Reflection: Second Light and features a new cast of characters. It aired from April to September 2021.

A four game bundle titled Blue Reflection Quartet will release on PlayStation 5, Microsoft Windows, Nintendo Switch, and Nintendo Switch 2 on July 30, 2026. This includes a newly made video game adaption of Blue Reflection Ray, alongside remastered versions of Blue Reflection and Blue Reflection: Second Light, and a console remake of the mobile game Blue Reflection: Sun. The games will be digitally only in English.

== Characters ==
Hiori Hirahara (平原 陽桜莉, Hirahara Hiori)
Voiced by: Manaka Iwami (Japanese); Kayli Mills (English)
Ruka Hanari (羽成 瑠夏, Hanari Ruka)
Voiced by: Haruka Chisuga (Japanese); Brianna Knickerbocker (English)
Momo Tanabe (田辺 百, Tanabe Momo)
Voiced by: Yuka Takakura (Japanese); Erica Mendez (English)
Miyako Shirakaba (白樺 都, Shirakaba Miyako)
Voiced by: Hitomi Ōwada (Japanese); Madeline Dorroh (English)
Mio Hirahara (平原 美弦, Hirahara Mio)
Voiced by: Reina Ueda (Japanese); Maureen Price (English)
Nina Yamada (山田 仁菜, Yamada Nina)
Voiced by: Nina Tamaki (Japanese); Katelyn Barr (English)
Uta Komagawa (駒川 詩, Komagawa Uta)
Voiced by: Rui Tanabe (Japanese); Lindsay Sheppard (English)
Shino Mizusaki (水崎 紫乃, Mizusaki Shino)
Voiced by: Shiori Izawa (Japanese); Kimberley Anne Campbell (English)
Ryōka Tachibana (橘 涼楓 Tachibana Ryōka)
Voiced by: Yurika Hirayama (Japanese); Morgan Berry (English)
Amiru Sumeragi (皇 亜未琉, Sumeragi Amiru)
Voiced by: Ayumi Mano (Japanese); Jalitza Delgado (English)

== Production and release ==
On February 12, 2021, an anime television series spin-off of the video game Blue Reflection by J.C.Staff named Blue Reflection Ray was announced. The series is directed by Risako Yoshida, with Akiko Waba writing and overseeing scripts, Koichi Kikuta adapting Mel Kishida's original character designs for animation, and Daisuke Shinoda composing the series' music. The series aired from April 10 to September 25, 2021, on the Animeism programming block on MBS, TBS, and BS-TBS. (Note: MBS and TBS lists the series premiere at 25:55 on April 9, 2021, which is effectively 1:55 a.m. JST on April 10.) EXiNA performed the series' opening theme song, "DiViNE", while ACCAMER performed the series' ending theme song "Saishin". Eir Aoi performed the series' second opening theme song, "Atokku", while ACCAMER performed the series' second ending theme song "fluoresce". Funimation previously streamed the series outside of Asia. Mighty Media has licensed the series in Southeast Asian territories. The series ran for two consecutive cours (seasons).

On June 15, 2021, a Blu-ray release of the series was canceled due to "various reasons." On May 26, 2022, Crunchyroll announced that they would begin streaming the series on June 7, along with an English dub.

=== Episodes ===
No.	Title	Directed by	Written by	Storyboarded by	Original release date
1	"The Undying Light"; Transliteration: "Kienai Hikari" (Japanese: 消えない光)	Nana Harada	Akiko Waba	Risako Yoshida	April 10, 2021
2	"Without a Single Friend"; Transliteration: "Tomo, Hitori mo Naku" (Japanese: 友、一人もなく)	Chihiro Kumano	Akiko Waba	Kunihisa Sugishima	April 17, 2021 (Note: This episode aired at 2:10 a.m. JST, 15 minutes after the original air time.)
3	"Hiding Your True Feelings"; Transliteration: "Honshin Kakushite" (Japanese: 本心隠して)	Miyuki Ishida; Kōzō Kaihō	Akiko Waba	Tōru Yoshida	April 24, 2021
4	"Asking for the Impossible"; Transliteration: "Nai Mono Nedari" (Japanese: ないものねだり)	Yasuo Iwamoto	Akiko Waba	Hiroshi Kawashima	May 1, 2021
5	"I Can't See Anything"; Transliteration: "Nani mo Mienai Watashi" (Japanese: 何もみえないわたし)	Akira Tanaka	Akiko Waba	Sayaka Morikawa	May 8, 2021
6	"The Girl With Briars Surrounding Her Heart"; Transliteration: "Kokoro ni Ibara o Motsu Shōjo" (Japanese: 心に茨を持つ少女)	Toshikatsu Tokoro	Seishi Minakami	Kunihisa Sugishima	May 15, 2021
7	"Please, Just Let Me Have What I Want"; Transliteration: "Onegai da Kara Hoshii Mono o Te ni Iresasete" (Japanese: お願いだから欲しいものを手に入れさせて)	Makoto Sokuza	Seishi Minakami	Kōichi Takada	May 22, 2021
8	"Panic"; Transliteration: "Panikku" (Japanese: パニック)	Miyuki Ishida	Akiko Waba	Iku Suzuki	May 29, 2021
9	"What She Said"; Transliteration: "Kanojo no Itta Koto" (Japanese: 彼女の言ったこと)	Akira Tanaka	Yukie Sugawara	Hiroshi Kawashima	June 5, 2021
10	"The Beautiful Girls Digging a Grave"; Transliteration: "Haka o Horu Utsukushii Musume-tachi" (Japanese: 墓を掘る美しい娘たち)	Chihiro Kumano	Seishi Minakami	Kurio Miyaura	June 12, 2021
11	"Tell Me I'm Guilty"; Transliteration: "Watashi ni Yūzai Senkoku o" (Japanese: わたしに有罪宣告を)	Miyuki Ishida	Akiko Waba	Kunihisa Sugishima	June 19, 2021
12	"Greatest Depths"; Transliteration: "Saishin" (Japanese: 最深)	Akira Tanaka	Akiko Waba	Tōru Yoshida	June 26, 2021
Special	"Special Edition"; Transliteration: "Tokubetsu-hen" (Japanese: 特別編)	Nao Sakamoto	Nao Sakamoto	Nao Sakamoto	July 3, 2021
A recap of the first 12 episodes of the series.
13	"Some Girls"; Transliteration: "Samu Gāruzu" (Japanese: サム・ガールズ)	Yūki Morita	Akiko Waba	Sayaka Morikawa	July 10, 2021
14	"The Witness Who Lost Her Words"; Transliteration: "Kotoba o Nakushita Mokugekisha" (Japanese: 言葉をなくした目撃者)	Toshikatsu Tokoro	Seishi Minakami	Katsumi Terahigashi	July 17, 2021
15	"Getting Along"; Transliteration: "Nakayoku Tsurunde" (Japanese: 仲良くつるんで)	Kōhei Hatano	Akiko Waba	Kōhei Hatano; Takaaki Ishiyama	July 24, 2021 (Note: This episode aired at 2:05 a.m. JST, 10 minutes after the original air time.)
16	"Rubber Ring"; Transliteration: "Rabā Ringu" (Japanese: ラバー・リング)	Yūsuke Onoda	Akiko Waba	Sayaka Morikawa	July 31, 2021 (Note: This episode aired at 2:30 a.m. JST, 35 minutes after the original air time.)
17	"Angel Angel"; Transliteration: "Enjeru Enjeru" (Japanese: エンジェル・エンジェル)	Fumihiro Ueno	Seishi Minakami	Katsumi Terahigashi	August 7, 2021
18	"Cemetery Gate"; Transliteration: "Semetarī Gēto" (Japanese: セメタリー・ゲート)	Akira Tanaka	Seishi Minakami	Takaaki Ishiyama	August 14, 2021
19	"Found You, Found You, I Found You"; Transliteration: "Mitsuketa, Mitsuketa, Mitsuketa yo" (Japanese: 見つけた、見つけた、見つけたよ)	Yūki Morita	Akiko Waba	Katsumi Terahigashi	August 21, 2021
20	"Guillotine Margaret"; Transliteration: "Girochin no Māgaretto" (Japanese: ギロチンのマーガレット)	Yūya Horiuchi	Akiko Waba	Tōru Yoshida	August 28, 2021 (Note: This episode aired at 2: a.m. JST, 5 minutes after the original air time.)
21	"I Still Haven't Mastered Anything"; Transliteration: "Mada Nani mo Mono ni Shite Inai yo" (Japanese: まだ何もものに していないよ)	Takaaki Ishiyama	Akiko Waba	Kōhei Hatano; Takaaki Ishiyama	September 4, 2021
22	"Deaths Side by Side"; Transliteration: "Tonari Awase no Shi" (Japanese: となりあわせの死)	Toshikatsu Tokoro	Seishi Minakami	Sayaka Morikawa	September 11, 2021
23	"You Now Have Everything"; Transliteration: "Subete o Te ni Shita Kimi" (Japanese: すべてを手にしたきみ)	Yūsuke Onoda	Seishi Minakami	Takaaki Ishiyama	September 18, 2021
24	"Blue Reflection"; Transliteration: "Burū Rifurekushon" (Japanese: ブルー・リフレクション)	Akira Tanaka	Akiko Waba	Risako Yoshida; Tōru Yoshida	September 25, 2021
