= Noriko Ogiwara =

Japanese fantasy writer (born 1959)

- Born: April 22, 1959 (age 67); Japan
- Occupations: novelist, manga writer
- Writing career
- Period: 1987–present
- Genres: romance, fantasy, Juvenile
- Notable work: The Jade Trilogy
- Website: andante-d.way-nifty.com/blog

Noriko Ogiwara (荻原規子) (born April 22, 1959) is a Japanese fantasy writer.

== Biography ==
Noriko Ogiwara was born in 1959. Having read C. S. Lewis' Chronicles of Narnia at a very early age, she decided to become a fantasy writer.

Her first book, Sorairo Magatama (空色勾玉, "Sky-colored Jade") won her several awards for children's literature and was translated into English by Cathy Hirano as Dragon Sword and Wind Child; the English version was out-of-print until it was re-released by Viz Media in October 2007. The two sequels, Hakuchou Iden (白鳥異伝, "Swan's Strange Legend") and Usubeni Tennyo (薄紅天女, "Pink Nymph"), were previously only published in Japanese. The re-issuing of Dragon Sword and Wind Child encouraged Viz to publish the next novel in the sequence, Hakuchou Iden, as Mirror Sword and Shadow Prince in May 2011, also translated by Cathy Hirano. The third novel, Usubeni Tennyo, has not been published in English. These three books together are called The Jade Trilogy.

Another of her works is Nishi no Yoki Majo (西の善き魔女 "Good Witch of the West Astraea Testament"), a western-styled high fantasy series featuring a girl on the quest of finding out the mysteries surrounding the legends of her country and her friends. The series consists of eight books, including three side stories also penned by her. Nishi no Yoki Majo has been adapted into a manga series by Haruhiko Momokawa in Comic Blade, and licensed for English publication as The Good Witch of the West. The Good Witch of the West was also animated and aired in Japan in 2006.

Her fantasy novel series Red Data Girl (RDG レッドデータガール, RDG reddo dēta gāru) was first published in 2008. It consists of six books, and was adapted into an anime television series.
