= Atelier Meruru: The Apprentice of Arland =

2011 video game

- North American PS3 cover art
- Developer: Gust Co. Ltd.
- Publishers: JP: Gust Co. Ltd.; WW: NIS America (PS3); WW: Tecmo Koei (Vita)
- Director: Yoshito Okamura
- Producer: Tadanobu Inoue
- Designers: Azusa Takahashi; Yoshito Okamura
- Programmer: Yuji Higuchi
- Artist: Mel Kishida
- Writers: Yasuhiro Nakai; Tamon Matsuzawa; Yoshito Okamura
- Composers: Daisuke Achiwa; Kazuki Yanagawa; Ken Nakagawa; Miyoko Kobayashi
- Series: Atelier
- Engine: PhyreEngine
- Platforms: PlayStation 3, PlayStation Vita, Nintendo Switch, PlayStation 4, Microsoft Windows
- Release: June 23, 2011: Atelier Meruru PlayStation 3; JP: June 23, 2011; EU: May 25, 2012; NA: May 29, 2012; AU: May 31, 2012 Atelier Meruru Plus PlayStation Vita; JP: March 20, 2013; NA: October 1, 2013; PAL: October 2, 2013 Atelier Meruru DX Nintendo Switch & PlayStation 4; JP: September 20, 2018; EU: December 4, 2018; NA: December 4, 2018 Microsoft Windows; WW: December 4, 2018
- Genre: Role-playing
- Mode: Single-player

Atelier Meruru: The Apprentice of Arland (Note: Japanese: メルルのアトリエ～アーランドの錬金術士3～, Hepburn: Meruru no Atorie: Ārando no Renkinjutsushi 3; lit. Atelier Meruru: The Alchemist of Arland 3) is a Japanese role-playing video game developed by Gust Co. Ltd. It was released for PlayStation 3 on June 23, 2011, in Japan. Atelier Meruru is the thirteenth installment in the Atelier series, and it continues the series' emphasis on item creation and synthesis. It is the third game in the Arland series and a direct sequel to Atelier Totori: The Adventurer of Arland. It was withdrawn from the market after a month due to being mis-rated, only being re-released after CERO applied a B rating a few days later. It is notably the last title that Gust self-published before merging with Tecmo Koei. A PlayStation Vita version titled Atelier Meruru Plus: The Apprentice of Arland was released on March 20, 2013, in Japan.

A port of the game titled Atelier Meruru DX for Nintendo Switch and PlayStation 4 was released on September 20, 2018, in Japan, and on December 4, 2018, in the West along with an additional Microsoft Windows release worldwide.

== Plot ==
Meruru is the princess of Arls, a little kingdom situated in the far north of the Arland republic. After her father and Gio, the leader of Arland, discussed the merging of the two lands, she met Totori, the now-graduated alchemist. Dazzled by the power of alchemy, and with a desire to help her country prosper, she forced herself on Totori as her first student. Her father initially disapproves of this decision but agrees following a suggestion from Rufus. He gives Meruru a directive to use her alchemy to improve the kingdom, with several intermediate goals which must be met within specific time periods in order to be allowed to continue her alchemy work. Later, Rorona joins the two, but she has been turned into a child by Astrid after drinking an experimental potion of youth.

== Characters ==
Merurulince Rede Arls (メルルリンス・レーデ・アールズ, Merururinsu Rēde Āruzu)
The protagonist of the game. She is the princess of Arls kingdom, though she eschews her royal duties and instead seeks a life of adventure. She has a bubbly personality, and often acts impulsively. She prefers to be called by her nickname, "Meruru".

Rorolina Frixell (ロロライナ・フリクセル, Rororaina Furikuseru)
Known as simply Rorona, she is Totori's teacher and the protagonist of the first Arland installment, Atelier Rorona: The Alchemist of Arland. She remains very energetic and knowledgeable about alchemy but takes the form of a child in this game. She prefers to be called by her nickname, "Rorona".

Totooria Helmold (トトゥーリア・ヘルモルト, Totūria Herumoruto)
Known as Totori, she is Meruru's mentor and previously Rorona's pupil and also the protagonist of the preceding installment, Atelier Totori: The Adventurer of Arland. She is gentle and frail but can lack tact at times.

Keina Swaya (ケイナ・スウェーヤ, Keina Suēya)
Meruru's childhood friend and a maid at the castle. She watches over Meruru, provides her company, and is well adapted to the princess's bizarre behavior.

Mimi Houllier von Schwarzlang (ミミ・ウリエ・フォン・シュヴァルツラング, Mimi Urie fon Shuwarutsurangu)
An Arland aristocrat who is exceedingly fond of Totori as a friend. She encounters Meruru through being hired by Rufus as her escort.

Lias Falken (ライアス・フォールケン, Raiasu Fōruken)
A childhood friend of Meruru who idolizes his older brother, Rufus.

Gino Knab (ジーノ・クナープ, Jīno Kunāpu)
An experienced adventurer involved in the events of the previous game.

Sterkenburg Cranach (ステルケンブルク・クラナッハ, Suterukenburuku Kuranahha)
Known as Sterk, he is a knight who was first involved in the events of first Arland game who holds very traditional views about knighthood and wants it re-instituted in Arland.

Esty Dee (エスティ・エアハルト, Esuti Eaharuto)
Previously a receptionist in the Adventurers' Guild, she is now an experienced adventurer.

Ludwig Giovanni Arland (ルードヴィック・ジオバンニ・アーランド, Rūdowikku Jiobanni Ārando)
Previously the king of Arland, he is now a wandering swordsman pursued by Sterk for his abolishment of the republic's knighthood.

== Combat ==
The game features a turn-based battle system. Battles are based on the idea that the princess, Meruru, is the leader and those accompanying her are considered "escorts." Meruru can use items in battle and depending on the conditions in battle, her escorts can chain attacks and the power of the items can be increased. The escorts have access to a range of special attacks that consume MP and later in the game gain access to powerful finishing moves. Totori and Rorona, as alchemists, are also able to use items, but cannot make use of the bonuses like Meruru. Opponents drop items that can be used for alchemy synthesis and the defeat of certain opponents are required to advance development in most areas.

== Rating controversy ==
One month after the game's initial release in Japan, shipments were halted due to it having been mis-rated. It was re-released a few days later with a B rating from CERO. Its A (All Ages) rating was revoked and it was given a B (Ages 12+) rating instead due to some suggestive scenes featured in-game. The game was originally rated for all ages due to Gust Corporation allegedly not providing them with complete content of the game to review. A similar occurrence happened years later when the North American PS Vita release of Gal★Gun: Double Peace, rated M for Mature by the ESRB, was mis-rated on the back as E for Everyone, but with the correct depiction of sexual content.

In Europe, the game has a PEGI rating of 12, citing violence, bad language and sexual content.

== PlayStation Vita release ==
A PlayStation Vita re-release, titled Atelier Meruru Plus: The Alchemist of Arland 3 was announced in January 2013. It features new scenes, costumes, areas, and boss enemies, as well as connectivity with the Vita release of Atelier Totori. Consumable items and enemy difficulty will be rebalanced to create a more enjoyable gameplay experience. Unlike Atelier Totori Plus, it features costumes for characters other than the player character, as well as a costume store that can be built over the course of the storyline. It was released in Japan on March 30, 2013, in standard and premium releases. The premium edition comes with a crystal paperweight. The English-language version was shown at E3 2013, and was released in North America on October 1, 2013, and in Europe and Australia on October 2, 2013, as a download-only title.

== Music ==
The opening theme of Atelier Meruru: The Apprentice of Arland is "Cadena" performed by Mineko Yamamoto (who also performed Atelier Totori: The Adventurer of Arland's opening theme) with Dani on guitar and bass. The title means "A Chain of Dreams". The ending theme is "Metro", sung by mao (who also performed the previous game's ending theme) with Akihisa Tsuboy on violin and Dani on guitar and bass. There are four in-game songs: "Alchemic Girl Meruru" by Marie, "Cloudy" sung by Chata, "Little Crown" sung by Mutsumi Nomiyama and "Renkinshoujo Meruru no uta," a vocal version of one of the game's battle themes.

== Reception ==
Reception

Aggregate score
Aggregator	Score
Metacritic	PS3: 66/100; VITA: 74/100

Review scores
Publication	Score
Electronic Gaming Monthly	7.5/10
Famitsu	8/10, 9/10, 9/10, 9/10
GameSpot	5/10

=== Japanese release ===
The game sold a total of 82,585 copies during its first week on sale in Japan and was the top-selling game of the week, outpacing the two previous Arland games. The game has sold a total of 155,772 copies in Japan.

Famitsu magazine scored the game 9/9/8/9 for a total of 35/40. Other reviews include scores of 78/100 and 71/100.

=== US release ===
Reviews have generally praised the game's reiteration of the series' iconic crafting system, but opinions on other aspects of the game have been mostly mixed or negative.

Metacritic reviewers gave the game a composite score of 66 out of 100, criticizing the niche qualities of the plot and gameplay, the story's lack of serious conflict and the game's fan-service orientation. The Vita port was received more positively at 74 out of 100, with reviewers citing the series' compatibility with mobile platforms in addition to "a better sense of pacing, more content, and free DLC."

IGN gave it a 6 out of 10, praising its gameplay and visuals, but criticized the story, voice acting, the lack of any central conflict, and uninteresting characters.

GameSpot gave it a 5 out of 10 for its crafting system but disliked the story, characters, emphasis on cuteness, and sexualization of its female cast.

EGM gave the game 7.5 out of 10, praising the alchemy system, character designs, and quirky character interactions, but found issue with the combat and occasional fanservice scenes. A second review five days later gave the title a 7 out of 10.

RPGamer gives the game 4 out of 5, making note of the game's crafting, character interactions, and graphics as strong points, but felt the main story and music were not as strong as they could have been.
