= Atelier Rorona: The Alchemist of Arland =

2010 video game

- Developer: Gust
- Publishers: JP: Gust; NA/PAL: NIS America
- Director: Yoshito Okamura
- Artist: Mel Kishida
- Composer: Ken Nakagawa
- Series: Atelier
- Engine: PhyreEngine
- Platforms: PlayStation 3, PlayStation Vita, Nintendo 3DS, Nintendo Switch, PlayStation 4, Windows
- Release: June 25, 2009: Atelier Rorona PlayStation 3; JP: June 25, 2009; NA: September 28, 2010; EU: October 22, 2010; AU: October 28, 2010 Atelier Rorona Plus PlayStation 3 & PlayStation Vita; JP: November 21, 2013; AU: June 19, 2014; EU: July 2, 2014; NA: June 24, 2014 (Retail); NA: July 22, 2014 (PSN) Nintendo 3DS; JP: June 4, 2015 Atelier Rorona DX Nintendo Switch & PlayStation 4; JP: September 20, 2018; EU: December 4, 2018; NA: December 4, 2018 Windows; WW: December 4, 2018
- Genre: Role-playing
- Mode: Single-player

Atelier Rorona: The Alchemist of Arland (Note: Japanese: ロロナのアトリエ ～アーランドの錬金術師～, Hepburn: Rorona no Atorie ~Aarando no Renkinjutsushi~) is a Japanese role-playing video game developed by Gust Co. Ltd. It first released for the PlayStation 3 on June 25, 2009, in Japan and was later re-released under the PlayStation 3 the Best label (which means it is a best-seller in Japan) on September 23, 2010. The North American release followed on September 28, 2010, along with a European release on October 22, 2010 and an Australia release on October 28, 2010.

Atelier Rorona is the eleventh installment in the Atelier series, and it continues the series' emphasis on item synthesis. The game is the first title in the series to be developed for PlayStation 3, and it is also the first to utilize 3D models as opposed to the 2D sprites in earlier titles. A sequel titled Atelier Totori: The Adventurer of Arland, which takes place five years after the end of Atelier Rorona, was released in Japan on June 24, 2010.

Gust released a remake titled Atelier Rorona Plus: The Alchemist of Arland for PlayStation 3 and PlayStation Vita on November 21, 2013, in Japan, and in June 2014 in the West. A version for Nintendo 3DS was released in 2015.

A port of the game titled Atelier Rorona DX for Nintendo Switch and PlayStation 4 was released on September 20, 2018, in Japan, and on December 4, 2018, in the West along with an additional Microsoft Windows release worldwide.

== Gameplay ==
A battle in Atelier Rorona depicting characters Sterkenburg and Rorona

Atelier Rorona has four main modes of gameplay: a field map, a battle screen, an alchemy system, and a visual novel system. Navigation occurs via two static map illustrations, which depicts the Arland town and its surrounding area in a scaled down view. Field map areas such as the town and forests are depicted as realistically rendered environments, in which the player can converse with locals, gather items, or encounter enemies. Enemies on field maps are openly visible to the players, and players can either engage or avoid the encounter. Contact with the enemies initiates a separate battle screen.

Battles in Atelier Rorona are turn-based and continue until either side is defeated or flees. The player may use physical attacks, items, or skills to either wound targets or heal characters. Each character and enemy has a number of hit points which depletes as he or she is attacked or performs certain skills. When a character loses all hit points, he or she faints; if all of the player's characters fall in battle, the player is sent back to the game's town. Certain items and skills also affect the battle's element, which, depending on the element, could either increase or decrease the efficiency of certain skills performed or make additional skills available.

Atelier Rorona's storyline is presented as a series of twelve tasks. Each of these tasks amounts to three months of the game's storyline and requires the player to complete it by the end of the period. If the player fails to complete the task, the game ends and must be restored from a previously saved game. The plot develops as the player progresses through text conversations akin to a visual novel-style gameplay. Gameplay in this segment requires little player interaction as most of the duration is spent reading the text that appears on the screen. There are fourteen main plot lines that the player will have the chance to experience. To view all of the plot lines, the player will need to replay the game multiple times and perform different quests for the game's various characters.

== Plot ==
The game opens with a brief introduction to the city of Arland, a city that is slowly being industrialized, but also a city that uses technology possessed by an ancient civilization. The main character, Rorolina Frixell, is being forced to work for the master alchemist Astrid Zexis to pay off a debt her parents owe. One day, Sterkenburg Cranach, a knight of Arland, comes to the alchemy workshop and informs Rorona that the shop will be shut down unless she is able to prove that it can function in the city's economy. Over the next three years, she must pass 12 examinations to assess the ability of the workshop to do this.

Atelier Rorona Plus introduces a postgame storyline (in between the ending and New Game+) set in a year of overtime featuring the two protagonists of the following two installments in the Arland series of Atelier as guest characters after they are sent back in time – Rorona's future apprentice Totooria Helmold (Totori) from Atelier Totori: The Adventurer of Arland and Totori's apprentice Princess Merurulince Rede Arls (Meruru) from Atelier Meruru: The Apprentice of Arland.

== Development ==
Atelier Rorona was first revealed on March 13, 2009, in ASCII Media Works' Dengeki PlayStation magazine. Yoshito Okamura, the main planner for the Mana Khemia series, served as the game's director. Ken Nakagawa, who contributed to previous Atelier soundtracks, also returned as the sole composer for the title. Mel Kishida, who also provided the game's illustrations, designed the game's characters. Okamura appointed Kishida, whose work is the artist's first video game contribution, to serve the position after finding that Kishida's work met his desires for a "modern and clean design in visuals." Atelier Rorona is described by the development team as a recreation of the series' starting points. It is the first title in the Atelier series to be produced for the PlayStation 3, and it is also the first to feature 3D computer graphics.

== Reception ==
Reception

Aggregate scores
| Aggregator | Score |
|---|---|
| GameRankings | PS3: 71% |
| Metacritic | PS3: 65/100; PS3 (Plus): 80/100; VITA: 79/100 |

Review scores
| Publication | Score |
|---|---|
| Famitsu | PS3: 26/40; VITA: 32/40 (Plus) 34/40 |
| GameSpot | 6.0/10 |
| IGN | 5.0/10 |

Atelier Rorona sold quickly in Akihabara on its first day of release, and, by 1:00 PM, the majority of the district's stores were sold out of the limited edition release. This is because the majority of the stores reserved a limited number of copies for regular sales to meet pre-order demands. The game had sold a total of 43,243 copies during its first week on sale in Japan and was the third best-selling game of the week. It dropped down to ninth place, selling 10,849 copies for the following week. According to public sales information published by Gamasutra, Atelier Rorona was the best-selling PlayStation 3 title on the Japanese Amazon website for the week ending on July 9, 2009. The game dropped to the second highest the following week ending on July 17, 2009, marking its final appearance in the ranking; overall estimates from this time put Rorona at or near 70,000 copies sold, with low-level sales continuing since. This makes Atelier Rorona the fastest and best selling title in the franchise since at least Atelier Iris: Eternal Mana. In December 2009, developer and publisher Gust noted that the company was pleased with Atelier Rorona's sales because of the game selling a total of 121,256 copies in Japan. Atelier Rorona fared well in the West, increasing its sales to over 200,000 copies worldwide, which the company considered as "good numbers for an HD generation RPG".

Atelier Rorona has received average reviews in Japan, receiving 80/75/70/65 in the Dengeki PlayStation magazine, and 7/6/7/6 for a total of 26/40 in the Famitsu magazine. However, Western reception was mixed. GameSpot awarded it 6.0 out of ten and said "confining deadlines and shallow exploration undermine the fun" of the game. IGN was more critical of the game, saying it was "missing that part where the game is compelling and fun."

US Gamer gave the remake Atelier Rorona Plus a 5/5 score, claiming that the new edition addresses the issues with the original version in addition to providing adequate amounts of new content. Both the PS3 and Vita versions of New Atelier Rorona (the Japanese title of the Atelier Rorona Plus enhanced remake) received Famitsu review scores of 34/40, an improvement over the original game.
