= List of Non Non Biyori episodes =

Non Non Biyori is an anime television series by Silver Link based on the manga series by Atto, which follows the lives of a group of children who live in the countryside. The first series aired in Japan between October 8 and December 24, 2013, and was simulcast by Crunchyroll. An original video animation episode was bundled with the seventh manga volume released on July 23, 2014. The opening theme is "Nanairo Biyori" (なないろびより, Rainbow-colored Weather) by Nano Ripe, and the ending theme, composed by Zaq, is "Non Non Biyori" (のんのん日和) sung by Rie Murakawa, Ayane Sakura, Kana Asumi and Kotori Koiwai. A second season, Non Non Biyori Repeat, aired between July 7 and September 22, 2015. The opening theme is "Kodama Kotodama" (こだまことだま, Echoing Words) by Nano Ripe and the ending theme is "Okaeri" (おかえり, Welcome Home) by Murakawa, Sakura, Asumi, and Koiwai. The series is licensed in North America by Sentai Filmworks.

A movie, Non Non Biyori Vacation, premiered on August 25, 2018. The film's opening theme song is "Ao no Rakugaki" (あおのらくがき) by Nano Ripe, and the ending theme song is "Omoide" (おもいで) composed by Zaq and performed by Murakawa, Sakura, Asumi, and Koiwai.

A third season, Non Non Biyori Nonstop, aired from January 11 to March 29, 2021. The staff and cast from the first two anime series are reprising their roles for the season. The opening theme is "Tsugihagi Moyō" (つぎはぎもよう, Patchwork Pattern) by nano.RIPE and the ending theme is "Tadaima" (ただいま, I'm Home) by Murakawa, Sakura, Asumi, and Koiwai. The third season ran for 12 episodes.

== Episodes ==
=== Non Non Biyori (2013) ===
No.	Title	Original release date
1	"A New Transfer Student Came"; Transliteration: "Tenkōsei ga Kita" (Japanese: 転校生が来た)	October 8, 2013
In the countryside village of Asahigaoka, a fifth grade elementary school girl named Hotaru Ichijou moves in from the city and transfers into the village's branch school, which consists of only four other students; a first grader named Renge Miyauchi and three middle school siblings, Natsumi, Komari and Suguru Koshigaya, along with their teacher, Renge's older sister Kazuho. After school, Renge invites Hotaru and the others to her house, where she shows off her pet tanuki. The next day, the girls take Hotaru to a blooming cherry blossom tree to eat their sakuramochi, though they end up missing the bus home on the way back.
2	"We Went to a Candy Store"; Transliteration: "Dagashi-ya ni Itta" (Japanese: 駄菓子屋に行った)	October 15, 2013
Hotaru develops a crush on Komari due to her short stature and feels happy after receiving some candy from her. Later, Komari invites Hotaru to come hang out with her, although Hotaru's choice of clothing causes Komari to mistake her for an unknown adult tourist from Tokyo. The two go to a candy store together, with Komari unaware she is actually hanging out with Hotaru the entire time.
3	"I Ran Away From Home With My Sister"; Transliteration: "Nee-chan to Iedeshita" (Japanese: 姉ちゃんと家出した)	October 22, 2013
The class goes on a school field trip to help out in a rice field, where Natsumi and Komari end up getting stuck in the mud. Later that night, Komari gets frightened after seeing a scary movie, which is not helped by Natsumi. After getting into a fight with her mother, Natsumi runs away from home with Komari in tow and goes to her secret hideout. They eventually spot a cat that had put Natsumi in trouble in the first place, but leave her alone when they see she is feeding her family and eventually head home.
4	"Summer Vacation Started"; Transliteration: "Natsuyasumi ga Hajimatta" (Japanese: 夏休みがはじまった)	October 29, 2013
As summer vacation begins, Renge's older sister Hikage comes home from her school in Tokyo, hoping to impress the others with her know-how about city life only for Hotaru to outshine her. Later, Renge meets another girl her age named Honoka Ishikawa, who she quickly becomes friends with. After spending several days playing with Honoka, Renge is saddened when she learns Honoka had to suddenly leave due to her father's work. However, she cheers up a week later after receiving a letter from Honoka saying she'll come back next summer.
5	"I Pretended I Forgot My Swimsuit"; Transliteration: "Mizugi o Wasureta Furi o shita" (Japanese: 水着を忘れたふりをした)	November 5, 2013
Hotaru and Renge are invited to the Koshigaya's house for breakfast. Afterwards, the girls, accompanied by Kazuho, go to the beach, where Komari's height leads her to be mistaken for a lost child. On their way home, the girls stop at a railside udon restaurant (tachigui udon stand), where a prank by Natsumi on Komari backfires due to Renge's innocence. They manage to catch the last train home on time, but accidentally leave Kazuho behind.
6	"I Became a Ghost and Tried Hard"; Transliteration: "Obake ni Natte Ganbatta" (Japanese: おばけになってがんばった)	November 12, 2013
Natsumi gets chewed out by her mother over her poor school grades whilst also trying to hide her poor test results from her. Afterwards, the girls visit Hotaru, who attempts to hide the vast number of handmade Komari plushies in her room. This ultimately fails, but she manages to pass them off as part of a school project. Later that night, the gang have a test of courage at the shrine, which proves a bit too much for Komari.
7	"My Rice Cracker Turned Into Curry"; Transliteration: "Senbei ga Karē ni Natta" (Japanese: せんべいがカレーになった)	November 19, 2013
With Kazuho absent at the start of the new semester, the girls try to find ways to pass the time in class. Later, Hotaru and Renge try and catch a rabbit that had escaped from its pen, only for it to lock them inside the pen themselves, though they are eventually rescued by Kazuho. Afterwards, Renge visits the candy store run by Kaede Kagayama, who finds her to be a handful.
8	"We Cooked Rice at School"; Transliteration: "Gakkō de Gohan o Taita" (Japanese: 学校でごはんを炊いた)	November 26, 2013
Hotaru gets along with the Koshigaya family's next door neighbour, Konomi Fujimiya, whilst Komari laments that the two seem more grown up than she is. Later, Komari joins Hotaru and Renge in doing some sketching, where she ends up becoming a model for them. Afterwards, Konomi helps Komari and Natsumi make dried persimmons.
9	"We Tried Having a Cultural Festival"; Transliteration: "Bunkasai o Yattemita" (Japanese: 文化祭をやってみた)	December 3, 2013
Since the school doesn't hold cultural festivals, Natsumi suggests they hold their own and invite the alumni, including Kaede, Konomi and Hikage. At the festival, the girls run a café, hold an art exhibit and put on a play. However, their play ends up being overwhelming and they end up slacking on food orders. They do eventually work together to prepare some food and have fun. Afterwards, Komari and Konomi help clean Natsumi's room, where they find a lot of old toys.
10	"We Watched the First Sunrise of the Year"; Transliteration: "Hatsuhinode o Mita" (Japanese: 初日の出を見た)	December 10, 2013
After sleeping through the New Year, Renge joins Kazuho, Hikage and Kaede as they decide to go up a mountain to watch the first sunrise of the year. Along the way, Kaede recalls five years ago when she was first asked to look after the one-year-old Renge, initially finding her to be quite a handful but soon taking a liking to her. They eventually manage to reach the top of the mountain and watch the sun as it rises.
11	"We Made Snow Houses"; Transliteration: "Kamakura o Tsukutta" (Japanese: かまくらをつくった)	December 17, 2013
Due to a snowy blizzard, the girls end up having to spend the night at school, with Hotaru and Natsumi competing against each other to see who gets to sleep in a futon, eventually decided to just kick Kazuho out of hers. Later that night, Hotaru decides to check out the snow and see the starry night sky, leading to some misunderstandings from Komari and Natsumi. Later, on another snowy day, the gang decide to try their hand at skiing before building a snow house and having some hot food.
12	"Spring Came Again"; Transliteration: "Mata Haru ga Kita" (Japanese: また春が来た)	December 24, 2013
As Spring arrives again, Hotaru and Komari go on a picnic together, where Hotaru ends up eating Komari's botched up homemade lunch in order to not hurt her feelings. Later, the girls get together to search for some edible plants, eventually coming to a field of renge flowers where Natsumi makes a costume for Renge.
13 (OVA)	"We're Going to Okinawa"; Transliteration: "Okinawa e Ikukoto ni Natta" (Japanese: 沖縄へ行くことになった)	July 23, 2014
Suguru wins some tickets to Okinawa in a shopping mall lottery, so the whole gang plan to go on a trip there. To prepare for the trip, the girls practice being on an airplane and go to a convenience store to buy some travel things. Meanwhile, Renge is very thoughtful about how the trip may change her view on the world, spending the evening before the trip giving her farewells to the countryside. The next day, everyone sets off on their flight to Okinawa.

=== Non Non Biyori Repeat (2015) ===
No.	Title	Original release date
1	"I Became a First Grader"; Transliteration: "Ichi-nen-sei ni Natta" (Japanese: 一年生になった)	July 7, 2015
Renge, who is about to start first grade, goes with the others to check out the school before the entrance ceremony, before seeing Hikage off as she goes to Tokyo. The next day, as Renge and the others enjoy the entrance ceremony and begin their first lessons, Hotaru starts moving in.
2	"We Went to Look at the Stars"; Transliteration: "Hoshi o Mi ni Itta" (Japanese: 星を見に行った)	July 14, 2015
A few days after transferring in, Hotaru and the others play a game in which they try to knock each other's rulers off a table. Later, Hotaru gets lost while walking her dog Pechi, but manages to get pointed back towards home thanks to Pechi's scent. Afterwards, Hotaru goes with Komari to watch the stars together, but run into trouble when their flashlight runs out of battery before they head back. Komari, viewing herself as the older one, takes the initiative of finding their way back, and thanks to a wayward bottle cap Komari dropped earlier, they soon manage to make their way back home. The next day, Hotaru is shown drawing pictures of Komari in class.
3	"We Got Motivated During the Holiday Break"; Transliteration: "Renkyūchū ni Yaruki o Dashita" (Japanese: 連休中にやる気を出した)	July 21, 2015
The girls attempt to do some studying for upcoming tests, with Natsumi ending poorly due to her slacking off. As the girls plan another study session during Golden Week, Renge tries to get Kazuho motivated so they can study.
4	"I Made a Teru-teru Bouzu"; Transliteration: "Teruterubōzu o Tsukutta" (Japanese: てるてるぼうずを作った)	July 28, 2015
Wanting to clear up the rain so she can ride her new bike, Renge dresses up as a teru teru bōzu, which Komari mistakes for a monster. Later, Renge becomes saddened when some tadpole shrimp she was looking after die, but Natsumi manages to recover some of their eggs, which hatch into new babies.
5	"We Ate Okonomiyaki"; Transliteration: "Okonomiyaki o Tabeta" (Japanese: お好み焼きを食べた)	August 4, 2015
While cleaning the pool with everyone, Komari keeps finding herself on the receiving end of various water-based mishaps. The next day, as the others enjoy a day off school, Hotaru has to stay at home while waiting for a delivery, but becomes happy when the others come to pick her up. As the girls take shelter at the candy store when it starts raining, Kaede teaches them how to make okonomiyaki.
6	"We Made Friends With Fireflies"; Transliteration: "Hotaru to Nakayokunatta" (Japanese: ホタルと仲よくなった)	August 11, 2015
Natsumi tries to come up with some conversation topics while alone with Hotaru, only to find her go off about an anime series that she herself hasn't watched, but she soon comes across something of interest to Hotaru. The next day, Natsumi takes Hotaru and Renge bug hunting, where she shows them a cicada nymph. Later, Hotaru invites the girls to view some fireworks with them, only to find the store has run out, leaving only a single underwhelming one. As Hotaru feels down about disappointing everyone, Kazuho takes everyone to a special place filled with fireflies.
7	"We Bravely Dove In"; Transliteration: "Omoikitte Tobikonda" (Japanese: 思い切って飛び込んだ)	August 18, 2015
Hotaru gets a letter from her friend in Tokyo while Hikage shows Renge her own pictures of Tokyo Tower before having to play dolls with her. Later, Hotaru ends up losing her bag on the bus, so she, Renge, and Hikage make their way over to the bus depot to look for it, coming across various sights along the way. Afterwards, Hotaru manages to work up the courage to dive into the river for a picture to send to her friends in Tokyo.
8	"I Took Lunch Duty"; Transliteration: "Kyūshoku Tōban o Shita" (Japanese: 給食当番をした)	August 25, 2015
The girls do a woodwork class, where Natsumi and Renge struggle to come with an idea of what to make. Later, Natsumi recalls what happened years ago when Hikage brought in a baby Renge, who proceeded to cause chaos in her wake. On another day, Komari finds her old teddy bear and asks Hotaru to help her fix it.
9	"We Looked at the Moon Together"; Transliteration: "Minna de Otsukimi o Shita" (Japanese: みんなでお月見をした)	September 1, 2015
Tasked with catching some fish for her garden's pond, Natsumi holds a fishing tournament with the others at the lake, where Natsumi manages to catch a large carp. Afterwards, Komari and Konomi try to dress up Natsumi to look and act more girly. Later, Natsumi and Hikage inadvertently eat some dango meant for a moon-viewing party with everyone, struggling to come up with a plan to avoid disappointing the others.
10	"I Practiced Really Hard"; Transliteration: "Sugoku Renshū shita" (Japanese: すごく練習した)	September 8, 2015
Konomi decides to pretend to be a monster to tease Renge, who seems to show a talent for multiplication. The next day, Renge decides to try riding her bike without training wheels, with minimal supervision from Kaede. As Renge ends up with a fever the day afterwards, Kaede comes over to help look after her. After Renge recovers, Kaede decides to take the day off work to teach Renge how to ride her bike.
11	"I Became a Pampered Child"; Transliteration: "Amaenbō ni Natta" (Japanese: 甘えんぼうになった)	September 15, 2015
During winter break, Komari learns how to send an e-mail on Konomi's phone, but struggles to get a signal due to her short height. Meanwhile, Hikage becomes curious as to what Renge is drawing on her New Year's cards. Later, Hotaru spends New Year's Eve at home, where she acts more like a spoiled child than she does in front of her friends.
12	"A Year Passed"; Transliteration: "Ichinen ga Tatta" (Japanese: 一年がたった)	September 22, 2015
Everyone goes to the mountain to pick bamboo shoots, with Hotaru bringing along her family's dog, Pechi. Later, the girls prepare some lunches for a flower viewing party, having to find ways to pass the time while Natsumi and Komari's mother talks with the neighbor. As everyone enjoys the party, Hotaru looks forward to spending another year having fun with her friends.
13 (OVA)	"Hotaru Had Fun"; Transliteration: "Hotaru ga Tanoshinda" (Japanese: 蛍が楽しんだ)	September 23, 2016
On a Winter day, Hotaru has fun creating all kinds of things with the snow, which end up triggering a chain reaction of mishaps for Komari. During Spring, Hotaru goes to the candy store by herself and ends up making cookies with Kaede. On the last day of Summer, the girls use various senses to try and give Komari a pleasant dream. Finally, during the Autumn, the girls go to the woods to collect fruit, where Komari comes up against a flying squirrel.

=== Non Non Biyori Vacation (2018) ===
No.	Title	Original release date
N–A	"Non Non Biyori Vacation"; Transliteration: "Gekijō-ban Non Non Biyori Bakeishon" (Japanese: 劇場版 のんのんびより ばけーしょん)	August 25, 2018
As depicted in the first season's OVA, Suguru wins tickets for a four-day trip to Okinawa in a department store raffle. There, Natsumi befriends Aoi Nizato, a girl who helps out at the hotel they're staying, over their mutual age and interest in badminton. The next day, everyone separates into snorkeling and kayaking groups, the former in which Renge starts drawing her experiences. On the penultimate day, Aoi guides the girls around Okinawa, including playing a badminton match at her school and visiting a lake with bioluminescent algae. When everyone is packing up to go home, Natsumi cries over leaving before promising Aoi that she'll send her a photo of Asahigaoka and practice her badminton skills. Upon returning, Renge gives Natsumi a drawing of her and Aoi, which she pins on her room's wall.

=== Non Non Biyori Nonstop (2021) ===
No.	Title	Directed by	Written by	Original release date
0	"Just Before the Start! Let's Review Together!!"; Transliteration: "Sutāto Chokuzen! Minna de Issho ni Osarai Suru no!!" (Japanese: スタート直前！みんなでいっしょにおさらいするのん！！)	N/A	N/A	January 4, 2021
1	"I Played the Frog Song"; Transliteration: "Kaeru no Uta o Fuita" (Japanese: カエルの歌を吹いた)	Kento Shintani	Reiko Yoshida	January 11, 2021 (Note: This episode aired at 1:50 a.m. JST, 15 minutes after the original air time on TV Tokyo.)
The girls make dolls with tooth-picks and tape, and prank teacher Kazuho [Renge's sister]. Konomi invites new highschool student Akane for flute practice and sends Renge to meet her at the bus stop. After the end credits, Renge reveals why she was practicing the recorder-flute with so much diligence.
2	"Hotaru Was Really Mature?"; Transliteration: "Hotaru ga Otonappokatta?" (Japanese: 蛍が大人っぽかった？)	Yūsuke Tomita	Reiko Yoshida	January 18, 2021
Renge, Hotaru, and the Koshigaya siblings help Kazuho to plant seedlings in the Miyauchi's garden. They build a greenhouse for the seedlings after it starts raining and Renge worries they will get cold. That Sunday Konomi introduces Akane -who at first thinks Hotaru is older- to the other girls to help her with her anxiety. Later that week Hotaru, who after all is a 5th grader, is embarrassed when Konomi sees her acting childlike.
3	"We Were Always Like This"; Transliteration: "Mukashi Kara Kōdatta" (Japanese: 昔からこうだった)	Kento Shintani	Fumihiko Shimo	January 25, 2021
Natsumi breaks a planter playing ball with Renge's older sister, Hikage, who is back from Tokyo. After some debate they try to find Natsumi's mother to come clean, but learn from Komari she went to the candy shop. They then decide to hide the evidence so it doesn't look as if they are only apologizing because they got caught. That night they both reminisce about how they used to play and fight when they were younger, but also that they cared about each other. The next day is similar to the one they both remembered and Renge joins them to play.
4	"I Turned Into Santa to Deliver Tomatoes"; Transliteration: "Tomato o Todokeru Santa ni Natta" (Japanese: トマトを届けるサンタになった)	Jun Fukuta	Reiko Yoshida	February 1, 2021
Renge strolls around giving the tomatoes planted in episode 2 as a 'Summer Christmas' gift. She helps Shiori, the daughter of the resident police officer, who is lost and calls Renge onee-chan (big sister), much to her pleasure. Renge puts toy-handcuffs, she bought at the candy store with her New-Year's money, on Kaede but they can't find the key. Later Renge plays at being police officers with Shiori and decide to arrest Hikage and Natsumi. When Shiori falls asleep, Renge takes her role as a big sister very seriously.
5	"I Made Something Incredible"; Transliteration: "Monosugoi Mono o Tsukutta" (Japanese: ものすごいものを作った)	Yasufumi Soejima	Yuka Yamada	February 8, 2021
Hotaru builds a small robot from a kit as a free study project, and dresses it as Komari riding a dog. The robot escapes and goes on an adventure. Akane shows up at Konomi's house on the wrong day, and embarrassed by her mistake hides from her with Renge's help. While teaching Renge to play hospcotch, Konomi and then Natsumi show up and mistaking Akane for a wild animal chase her until she ends up like "a slug that found salt". Later she crosses paths with Hotaru's robot that somehow manages to return home. On another day, Hotaru and Komari invite Akane to hang out, and she tells them of her encounter with the "miniature Komari". Things quickly escalate from there.
6	"We All Went Camping Together"; Transliteration: "Minna de Kyanpu ni Itta" (Japanese: みんなでキャンプに行った)	Jun'ya Koshiba	Fumihiko Shimo	February 15, 2021
Wednesday, August 25th, Kazuho Miyauchi [Renge's older sister & homeroom teacher] brings the whole class camping. Come nightfall, Kazuho falls asleep after drinking too much and Natsumi goes hunting for rhinoceros beetles with Renge. However Kazuho wakes up and, still very much drunk, goes looking for the girls and ends up scaring the beejesus out of Komari. As the end of vacation time draws near, Natsumi goes to the Miyauchi's to do her Summer homework with Hikage at the last possible moment, but they decide to boycott doing it. As the others prepare for a new semester, Renge draws her sister and Natsumi while they sleep.
7	"It Was a Thrilling Autumn"; Transliteration: "Harahara Suru Aki Datta" (Japanese: ハラハラする秋だった)	Tsutomu Yabuki	Yuka Yamada	February 22, 2021
It is parents day at Asahigaoka Branch School, and the presence of Yukiko Koshigaya (Natsumi, Komari, and Suguru's mother) makes both Natsumi and Kazuho nervous. Renge and Shiori (daughter of resident police officer, episode 4) play with a ball together, and it somehow turns into a philosophical discussion. Natsumi and Renge set up a fish-tank for Salt, a crab the younger girl wants to keep until the weather warms up again. Pleased with Natsumi for helping her little sister set the tank, Kazuho invites her for dinner, but the planned meal shocks Renge.
8	"My Senpai Had Entrance Exams Coming Up"; Transliteration: "Senpai wa Mōsugu Juken Datta" (Japanese: 先輩はもうすぐ受験だった)	Kento Shintani	Fukurō Kamiza	March 1, 2021
One of Akane's higher-grade schoolmates leaves the school's music club to prepare for entrance exams. This makes Akane worry that Konomi will also quit the club. After school Akane meets Konomi perchance and they hang out at a festival. That night Konomi stays over at the Koshigaya's, then Natsumi starts a pillow fight, tries to hide a hole in the screen-door from her mother, and things take an unexpected turn. On another day, Akane confides in Renge she worries not being able to practice with Konomi once she goes to college. Later on Hotaru, Komari and Natsumi arrive at Konomi's house looking for Renge, and Akane gets her anxiety under control and plays the flute for them.
9	"We Made Tasty Food"; Transliteration: "Oishii Gohan o Tsukutta" (Japanese: おいしいごはんを作った)	Yuki Inaba	Fukurō Kamiza	March 8, 2021
While at home alone, Komari struggles with her fear of ghosts and an unexpected guest. After agreeing with Hotaru to knit gifts for each other, Komari asks for Natsumi's help when her work doesn't meet her expectations. Later, Komari decides to cook dinner for her family, but Natsumi strongly opposes the idea.
10	"It Got Cold and Then Hot"; Transliteration: "Samuku Nattari Attakaku Nattari Shita" (Japanese: 寒くなったりあったかくなったりした)	Jun Fukuta	Reiko Yoshida	March 15, 2021
Hikage gets too greedy with New Year's allowance, annoying Renge. During a blizzard, Natsumi and Renge force Hikage to play outdoors, further irritating her with their nonsense. Honoka, a girl Renge befriended in season 1 episode 4, is visiting her grandmother over Winter break. Although she isn't staying for long, Renge is happy to see her again.
11	"I Got Drunk and Remembered"; Transliteration: "Yopparatte Omoidashita" (Japanese: 酔っぱらって思い出した)	Jun'ya Koshiba	Reiko Yoshida	March 22, 2021
Renge hangs out with Shiori (Police officer's daughter), acting as a proper "big sister", and later plays dodgeball with Hotaru, Komari, and Natsumi. Talking about Shiori soon getting a little sister, and Komari and Natsumi's brother graduating middle school, makes Renge take her role as a "big sister" even more seriously. Kazuho invites Kaede (Candy Store) for drinks, who gets sloshed and hides her condition from Renge. Later, following a comment from Hikage, she reminisces about when Renge was a baby. Both young women reflect about how the children they used to take care of are now taking care of others.
12	"The Cherry Blossoms Bloomed Again"; Transliteration: "Mata Sakura ga Saita" (Japanese: また桜が咲いた)	Kento Shintani	Reiko Yoshida	March 29, 2021
The girls attend Suguru's graduation ceremony at school. Akane comes to hang out with Konomi and meets Hikage. They go to the candy store to buy snacks, but Kaede has closed it for the day so they force it open. Hotaru, Komari and Natsumi go to play with Renge, who made plans with Shiori earlier, so the five of them go to the candy store for carboard. The other girls are still there, and although Kaede insists it's her day off, they rope her into playing with them. When they walk Shiori back home, they find her mother in labour, call a taxi and look after Shiori. On another day, the cherry blossoms are blooming, heralding the coming of Spring. Suguru goes to highschool and the girls go get Shiori, who is starting elementary school. They meet Kasumi, Shiori's newborn sister, and Renge makes a pinky promise with the baby to look after her when she will start school.
13 (OVA)	"Our Club Worked Hard"; Transliteration: "Bukatsu wo Ganbatta" (Japanese: 部活をがんばった)	Shinya Kawamen	Shinya Kawamen	March 23, 2022
After the class, Kazuho assigns the girls their homework. While Natsumi looks disappointed with it, Shiori is very happy to have her very first homework. They go to Natsumi's house to do their homework together. Another day, Natsumi says that she wants to be the captain of a badminton club. Kazuho recommends Natsumi to ask Kaede because Kaede used to be into badminton and has the equipment. Though Kaede refuses Natsumi's request to teach them badminton, she accepts it after all, being asked by Renge and Shiori. While teaching them, Kaede is reminded of the day she gave a set of crayon to baby Renge. In the evening of that day, Natsumi talks on the phone with Aoi, the girl she befriended in Non Non Biyori Vacation.
