= Atelier Escha & Logy: Alchemists of the Dusk Sky =

Japanese video game

- European cover art

エスカ&ロジーのアトリエ ~黄昏の空の錬金術士~ (Esuka & Rojī no Atorie ~Tasogare no Sora no Renkinjutsushi~)
- Genre: Fantasy
- Video game
- Developer: Gust Co. Ltd.
- Publisher: Koei Tecmo
- Genre: Role-playing
- Engine: LTGL
- Platform: PlayStation 3, PlayStation Vita, PlayStation 4, Nintendo Switch, Microsoft Windows
- Released: June 27, 2013: Atelier Escha & Logy PlayStation 3; JP: 27 June 2013; AU: 6 March 2014; EU: 7 March 2014; NA: 11 March 2014 Atelier Escha & Logy Plus PlayStation Vita; JP: 22 January 2015; NA: 19 January 2016; EU: 20 January 2016 Atelier Escha & Logy DX Nintendo Switch & PlayStation 4; JP: 25 December 2019; EU: 14 January 2020; NA: 14 January 2020 Microsoft Windows; WW: 14 January 2020
- Anime television series
- Directed by: Yoshiaki Iwasaki
- Produced by: Akira Watanabe; Shūichi Takashino; Ryōichi Ishihara; Junzō Hosoi
- Written by: Tatsuhiko Urahata
- Music by: Hayato Asano (Gust); Kazuki Yanagawa (Gust)
- Studio: Studio Gokumi
- Licensed by: NA: Sentai Filmworks
- Original network: Tokyo MX, Sun TV, KBS, TV Aichi, BS11, AT-X
- English network: Anime Network
- Original run: 10 April 2014 – 26 June 2014
- Episodes: 12

Atelier Escha & Logy: Alchemists of the Dusk Sky (Note: Japanese: エスカ&ロジーのアトリエ ～黄昏の空の錬金術士～, Hepburn: Esuka & Rojī no Atorie ～Tasogare no Sora no Renkinjutsushi～) is a Japanese role-playing video game developed by Gust Co. Ltd. Given the project code "A15", it is the 15th game in the official Atelier series and the second installment of the Dusk storyline. Hidari remains as the character designer and the game runs on the LTGL engine. It was released in Japan on 27 June 2013.

In Japanese the title is Escha to Logy and that is in reference to the English word Eschatology which is the study of the end of the world, human history, or the current age.

An anime adaptation by Studio Gokumi aired from 10 April 2014 to 26 June 2014.

A version for the PlayStation Vita titled Atelier Escha & Logy Plus: Alchemists of the Dusk Sky was released in January 2015 and featured new playable characters, enemies and story events. A release in other territories came the following year.

An enhanced port of the game titled Atelier Escha & Logy: Alchemists of the Dusk Sky DX for Nintendo Switch and PlayStation 4 was released on 25 December 2019 in Japan, and on 14 January 2020 in the West along with an additional Microsoft Windows release worldwide.

== Gameplay ==
Atelier Escha & Logy allows players to choose between two protagonists. The main storyline remains the same regardless of who is chosen, but certain events and endings are only available using a particular protagonist.

With the new synthesis system, the player can combine different items. The two protagonists Escha and Logy use different kinds of tools to synthesize.

== Plot ==
The game's story takes place about four years after the beginning of Atelier Ayesha: The Alchemist of Dusk in a far away place to the west of the Twilight Land where the local administration hires two new alchemists, Escha and Logy as members of their R&D division. While learning the ropes of their new occupation, Escha and Logy gather friends and companions as they unlock the secrets of the nearby ruins and help the citizens in a world that is still recovering from a catastrophic event known as "The Dusk".

== Characters ==
Escha Malier (エスカ メーリエ, Esuka Mērie)
The first protagonist of the game. Escha is often quite quirky and cheerful and often shows her feelings very clearly. She is full of energy and is also a very curious person. Escha works as a government official alongside her partner Logy and performs alchemy using a cauldron to synthesize items.
Logix "Logy" Fiscario (ロジックス フィクサリオ, Rojikkusu Fikusario)
The second protagonist of the game. Logy is a serious and "down-to-earth" person but is also kind. He has a burn scar on one of his arms, and he seems to avoid talking about his past. Like Escha, he is a government official and is assigned to work with her. Instead of a cauldron, Logy uses specialized tools to assemble new weapons and armor and to disassemble items in order to discover their properties.
Lucille Ernella (ルシル・エルネラ, Rushiru Erunera)
Lucille is a new government official educated in medicine, sent to the development project from The Center. She is junior to Escha and Logy within the development team, and address them both with the "senpai" honorific. She is serious about her work and polite, but sometimes she makes big mistakes. She comes from the rich Ernella family.
Awin Sidelet (アウィン・サイドレット, Awin Saidoretto)
Escha's cousin, Awin is a balloon-mechanic working in the engineering team. He is responsible for the maintenance of public facilities, carriages, and so on. He's a caring person and admires the adventurer Reyfer Luckberry. Since he is very knowledgeable about mechanical arts, he provides assistance with various sides of investigations.
Reyfer Luckberry (レイファー・ラックベリー, Reifā Rakkuberī)
Reyfer is a sharpshooter and treasure hunter who joins the team in search for ancient relics.
Threia Hazelgrimm (スレイア・ヘーゼルグリム, Sureia Hēzerugurim)
Threia is an archeologist who makes use of the knowledge obtained from her studies to fight. Her uncle is Keithgriff Hazeldine, which she doesn't have a good relationship with.
Linca (リンカ, Rinka)
Returning from the previous game, Linca is a swordswoman and Marion Quinn' bodyguard. She joins the party under Marion's request.
Wilbell voll Erslied (ウィルベル・ヴォル エルスリート, Uiruberu Boru Erusurīto)
Return from the previous game. Wilbell is traveling, along with Nio, to better improve magic and to search for Ayesha.
Nio Altugle (ニオ・アルトゥール, Nio Arutūru)
Return from the previous game. Nio is currently traveling with Wilbell and is a traveling apothecary. She is able to sense and communicate with spirits and trying to find her sister by searching the ruins. Escha calls her "Miss Nio" which she told not to call her that because it makes her a little embarrassed.
Katla Larchika (カトラ・ラーチカ, Katora Rāchika)
A young shopkeeper who frequently tries to swindle her customers.
Micie Sun Mussemburg (ミーチェ・サン・ミュッセンブルグ, Mīche San Myussenburugu)
A brilliant upstart with the government agency.
Solle Gumman (ソール・グラマン, Sōru Guraman)
A very strict official who is in charge of the subdivision's budget.
Marion Quinn (マリオン・クィン, Marion Quin)
A government official from a foreign country who leads the development team.
Duke Beriel (デューク・ベリエル, Dūku Berieru)
A bartender and a retired government agent with a very strong personality.

== Media ==
=== Anime ===
A 12-episode anime television series adaptation, produced by Studio Gokumi and directed by Yoshiaki Iwasaki, aired from 10 April 2014 to 26 June 2014. The opening is "Asuiro" (アスイロ) by Rie Murakawa, and the ending theme is "Fuyumidori" (ふゆみどり) by Haruka Shimotsuki. The anime has been licensed by Sentai Filmworks for streaming and home video release.

==== Episode list ====
No.	Title	Original release date
1	"Welcome to the Atelier!"; Transliteration: "Yōkoso atorie e!" (Japanese: ようこそアトリエへ！)	10 April 2014
Escha Malier starts her first day as an official alchemist at the city of Colset's R&D division, under the supervision of head official Colland Grumman, his son and the treasurer Solle, and R&D division head Marion Quinn. There, she has an awkward first meeting with fellow alchemist Logix "Logy" Fiscario, who is also a newcomer to the division. Later, Escha and Logy are ordered to fix the local apple orchard's windmill as their first assignment. While on their way to the orchard, Escha tells Logy that the orchard belongs to her family, while he tells her about the Land of Dusk, the uninhabitable wasteland that surrounds Colset and encompasses most of the world. The two travel through the Land of Dusk and reach the orchard, where Logy meets Clone, an automaton who is the orchard's groundskeeper and Escha's surrogate mother; and Awin Sidelet, an engineer and Escha's cousin. As they gather the materials needed to fix the windmill's damaged axle, Escha asks Logy about his alchemical background, but he refuses to share certain details. They eventually manage to repair the axle and reinstall it without any problems. Later, they see the Unexplored Ruins, an abandoned castle floating high in the sky, which has yet to be explored due to winds and surrounding debris. Escha shares with Logy her dream to one day explore the Unexplored Ruins.
2	"What's a Witch?"; Transliteration: "Mahōtsukai tte nan desu ka?" (Japanese: 魔法使いってなんですか？)	17 April 2014
Escha and Logy meet Linca, a swordswoman who is Marion's close friend and bodyguard. Later, they are tasked to provide assistance to a nearby village to the north of Colset, which is short on water due to pollution. While waiting for the town's transport balloon, their only efficient means of transport, to be repaired, Escha purchases an alchemical book from new shopkeeper Katla Larchika, which contains instructions on how to create the Bottle of Purity, a medicine that can remove every kind of contamination from water. Under the instruction of local chef Duke Beriel, Escha and Logy travel on foot to some ruins along the way to the northern village, to retrieve a key ingredient. At the ruins, Escha and Logy split up to look for the ingredient, and Escha is poisoned after touching a toxic flower. She is treated by two travelers, Nio Altugle and Wilbell voll Erslied, who agree to assist her and Logy. The group finds shrubs of the ingredient growing atop a cliff, and Logy scales the precipice to retrieve some. In the process, he nearly falls, but Wilbell saves him using her magic before making Escha promise not to reveal her abilities to anyone else. Escha and Logy manage to finish the Bottle of Purity and use it to clean the northern village's water supply.
3	"I'll Fight, Too!"; Transliteration: "Watashi datte tatakaimasu!" (Japanese: 私だって戦います！)	24 April 2014
Though the Bottle of Purity succeeds in cleaning the village's water supply, Escha and Logy learn that the pollution is coming from the water's source, a set of ruins located upstream and that it will continue. Realizing that the Bottle of Purity will not keep the water clean forever, Escha decides to travel to the ruins with Logy, Nio, and Wilbell and investigate the cause of the pollution. There, Escha and Logy have an encounter with Reyfer Luckberry and Harry Olsen, a pair of looters. The group then meets archaeologist Threia Hazelgrimm, who tells them that a highly advanced civilization famous for its powerful alchemy was responsible for building the ruins. They arrive at the heart of the ruins, where the water source is, just as they awaken a large, robot-like alchemic lifeform with near-invincibility, left behind by the civilization that created it. During the battle, Linca, Awin, Reyfer, and Harry arrive; and Escha eventually destroys the lifeform with a powerful explosive. The group then finds that the water supply was being obstructed and removes the obstacle, permanently purifying the water. Afterward, Awin takes the others back to Colset. During the flight back home, Nio explains that she had begun hearing the voice of a girl ever since she arrived at the region, which was why she and Wilbell were drawn to the city.
4	"It's a Barrel! It's a Tail!"; Transliteration: "Taru desu! Shippo desu!" (Japanese: たるです！しっぽです！)	1 May 2014
While settling into their new residence at Colset, Wilbell becomes interested in Escha's artificial tail, and Escha explains that her late alchemist mother, Miria, created it as a gift and accessory for her, in order to keep her from feeling lonely. Later, while trying to buy furniture from Katla, Escha learns that mass-producing her tail and selling it could have a significant, positive impact on Colset's economy, which is mostly reliant on its apples. Though she initially refuses, not wishing to use alchemy as a way to make money, Escha eventually decides to recreate it, but only to learn more about Miria. After failed attempts to learn about the tail, Escha and Logy find a storybook that Clone used to read to Escha in her childhood. Reading it again causes Escha to remember the recipe, and she manages to recreate the tail, though it cannot move just like hers. Disappointed in the result, Wilbell uses magic to give the tail an ability to move, but she instead implants an animal spirit. The tail escapes and temporarily gives animal attributes to anyone it touches. The magic eventually wears off, but Escha is reprimanded and forced to write an apology letter. When Escha wonders why the recreated tail wouldn't move while hers could, Logy suggests that Miria's feelings for Escha may have had a factor in the tail's makeup.
5	"I became a Senpai!"; Transliteration: "Watashi, senpai ni narimashita!" (Japanese: 私、先輩になりました！)	8 May 2014
Lucille Ernella, a medical specialist, arrives from Central to work on the R&D division. She is placed under Escha and Logy's tutelage, though she proves to be quite capable compared to her peers. During an assignment in town, Lucille purchases a rare toy from Reyfer, despite its unusually high price. She also strikes up a friendship with R&D's homunculi. Later, the R&D division is assigned to prepare medicine to prevent an epidemic, and Lucille volunteers to do the task. However, she declines any assistance from the other members and does the work on her own, distancing herself from everyone else. However, labor affects her health and she is unable to make any progress. While visiting her, Escha and Logy learn that Lucille, the daughter of a wealthy family, had difficulties in comprehending medicine-making instructions and was thus excluded from preparing medicine at Central. Wanting to help the world rather than live a life of luxury, Lucille decided to leave home and moved to Colset. Escha and Logy realize from her story that Lucille did not ask others for help, thus leading to her failure, and offer their assistance. With the help of the others, Lucille overcomes her difficulties and creates the medicine, which is accepted. She receives a letter of thanks from her family's company, which moves her, and she writes a response for them.
6	"Which Is the Good Dessert?"; Transliteration: "Oishī dezāto do~re da?" (Japanese: おいしいデザートど～れだ？)	15 May 2014
Escha is tasked by her father Faul to find a new way to improve the harvest on the local orchard. While volunteering at the orchard, Escha, Logy, and Lucille decide to take apples discarded during fruit thinning and use them for a new recipe. While looking for ideas, she and her friends decide to hold a contest to look for recipes at the same time as an eating contest held at the local restaurant. Meanwhile, Logy is selected by the restaurant owner, Duke Beriel, as a contestant in the eating contest, and is assigned to find more participants. He eventually convinces Awin, Linca, and Reyfer to become contestants as well. The next day, the double event begins; after Linca wins the eating contest, she tries the recipes created by Escha and the others, and though she likes all of them, she chooses Wilbell's as her favorite. Linca's ruling inspires Escha to create a new synthetic soil, made with concentrated nutrients taken from different types of soils, for the apple orchard. Clone leads Escha to a section of the orchard that was reserved for alchemists in the Malier family, who have worked hard to maintain it with varying degrees of success, and shows her the tree that Miria worked on. As the latest Malier alchemist in charge of the section, Escha resolved to do her best in maintaining it. Later, Escha, Lucille, and Nio throw a party for Wilbell's victory, and Wilbell reveals that she used magic on her recipe. Escha then reads one of her childhood storybooks to the others. In the epilogue, a mysterious girl in the Unexplored Ruins declares that she hates humans more than anything else.
7	"It's All Ms. Linca!"; Transliteration: "Nani ga nan da ka Rinka-san!" (Japanese: なにがなんだかリンカさん！)	22 May 2014
The members of the R&D division prepare for the arrival of an auditor to check on their work, with Escha and Linca being put on break after cleaning duty. While having tea with Nio, Linca is forced to leave after a confrontation with Wilbell, who explains that Linca attacked her unprovoked the previous night. Later, the auditor, Micie Sun Mussemburg, arrives at R&D's headquarters and admonishes Linca for an encounter previously unknown to her. While gathering ingredients, Escha and Logy find Linca at the restaurant, drinking and exhibiting uncharacteristic mannerisms. The next day, Linca is billed for damages to personal property and is positively identified by Katla, who was an eyewitness. Linca and Marion reveal that the former is a member of a set of clones who committed crimes, but were all eventually captured. While Marion rescued Linca and took her in, seven others escaped and one of them is likely responsible for the recent damages. During the search, Logy and Lucille find a clone drinking at the restaurant, while Escha and Wilbell track another at Nio's house. Wilbell pursues the malevolent second clone to downtown Colset, where Linca battles her and eventually wards her off. The first clone leaves peacefully, explaining she just went to Colset to check in on Linca and that she needed to continue her search for their mother.
8	"Too Hot? It's a Hot Springs Trip!"; Transliteration: "Atsu-atsu? Onsen ryokō desu!" (Japanese: アツアツ？温泉旅行です！)	29 May 2014
With all of their assignments completed for the quarter, the R&D division begins their holiday off. When no one has any idea how to spend their vacation, Wilbell appears and convinces them to accompany her on a hot springs trip located near the base of a volcano. At the hot springs, the girls enjoy the water while Logy and Awin set up the tents, during which Logy learns of Awin's dream to travel to the end of the world on his own balloon. Later, the girls are attacked by the Flame Ruler, a fire spirit residing in the springs. Wilbell reveals her true motive for going to the springs: to find the Flame Ruler and form a contract with it, in order to prove to her elder that she had been continuing her training in witchcraft. The gang learns that the Flame Ruler hates all humans because of looters destroying her shrine and stealing her ceremonial jewel long ago. Deciding to help the Flame Ruler, Escha, Logy, and Awin fly back to Colset to create a new ceremonial jewel, while the others stay behind to repair the shrine. When Escha, Logy, and Awin return, they find that the others have already repaired the shrine and placated the Flame Ruler. Escha places the new jewel on the shrine, which restores the Flame Ruler's powers. The gang enjoys the warmth of the hot springs again, while Wilbell decides to postpone her contract with the Flame Ruler and take her time to grow stronger.
9	"Oh No! The Dream is Going to be Stolen!"; Transliteration: "Gān! Yume ga torarechau!" (Japanese: ガーン！夢がとられちゃう！)	5 June 2014
As Escha, Logy, Threia, and Reyfer explore another set of ruins, Escha discovers a slab depicting the Unexplored Ruins and a girl levitating above it. The group later discovers a large mural. At the R&D headquarters, Threia explains that the mural was depicting the construction of the ruins they were in. It was an effort carried out by the teamwork between multiple countries who were researching a way to grow plants in a barren land, though they were unsuccessful and their civilizations died out in the end. In need of more information, Threia decides to issue a request for R&D to look for a means to reach the Unexplored Ruins. Escha is initially excited by the news, only for her dreams to be crushed when the members of the R&D division are ordered by the higher-ups to make preparations for another team to do so in their place. Clone later explains to Logy, Nio, and Wilbell that Escha had always aspired to go to the Unexplored Ruins ever since Miria's death, under the belief that someone was living there. Later, the R&D members resolve to explore the Unexplored Ruins first, and Marion drafts a request similar to the higher-ups' instructions, but with a small loophole that would allow them to make the exploration first. Colland realizes their intentions, but decides to submit the request after getting into a fistfight with Duke, a former colleague who is supportive of R&D's cause. After learning of all of this, Escha tearfully thanks everyone. In the epilogue, Nio hears the voice of the girl she had been hearing recurrently, telling her that she and the world don't need humans. The girl contacting Nio is then revealed to be the one residing in the Unexplored Ruins.
10	"Don't Give Up!"; Transliteration: "Akiramenaide!" (Japanese: あきらめないで！)	12 June 2014
Escha's cousin Awin and his team of mechanics have been working on an airship that can travel safely to the Unexplored Ruins, but several key components to build it are missing. While looking for ingredients to complete it, Escha learns that Logy was involved in building airships in the past, but a tragic accident made him abandon his dreams and she decides to encourage him to give himself another chance.
11	"The Unexplored Ruins I've Dreamed of!" Transliteration: "Akogare no mitō iseki desu!" (Japanese: あこがれの未踏遺跡です！)	19 June 2014
Boarding their new airship, Escha and her friends at last reach the unexplored ruins where they meet an enigmatic girl named Flameu that drives them away. Once back home, Escha learns from her foster mother, the automaton Clone the true story behind Flameu's tragic past and decides to return to the ruins in order to help her.
12	"It's Our Promise!"; Transliteration: "Watashi-tachi no yakusoku desu!" (Japanese: 私たちの約束です！)	26 June 2014
Back to the ruins, Escha and her friends confront Flameu and have her remember her past. Once she breaks free from the device that binds her to the ruins, they fall to the ground and Flameu departs to parts unknown after thanking Escha and Logy for their help. Some time later, Logy is summoned to work in the capital, and the two alchemists also part ways.

=== Manga ===
The game was adapted into a manga by Chako Abeno. The manga ran in Dengeki Maoh, starting with the December 2013 issue of the magazine until November 2014.

== Release ==
The game was initially released for the PlayStation 3 in Japan on 27 June 2013, with releases for other territories coming out the following year. In early 2015, a PlayStation Vita version was released, with the western versions coming out in early 2016. This port contained new playable characters, enemies and story events. The physical version for North America was available exclusively through a collector's edition sold on NIS America's webstore and the Canadian retailer videogamesplus.ca.

== Reception ==
Reception

Aggregate score
Aggregator	Score
Metacritic	PS3: 79/100; VITA: 75/100

Review scores
Publication	Score
Computer Games Magazine	(Plus) 7.5/10
Destructoid	(Plus) 7/10
Famitsu	PS3: 36/40; VITA: 33/40
Game Informer	7.75/10
GamesRadar+	4/5
Hardcore Gamer	4/5
IGN	7.0/10
Nintendo Life	(DX) 7/10
Push Square	(Plus) 5/10
RPGFan	88/100

Atelier Escha & Logy received a score of 85/80/85/80 in the magazine Dengeki PlayStation, the highest average/aggregate score a game in the series has received from that magazine's ratings so far. Outside Japan, the game has generally positive reviews. The IGN comments: "With tons of things to do, things to make, and areas to explore, Atelier Escha & Logy is a nice fusion of alchemy, adventure, and tactics".

Most of the critics praise the idea of choosing between two heroes, the battle, and gameplay tactics. Koei Tecmo reported the game to have sold 100,000 units in Japan alone in their presentation material for the period. The game sold 57,550 copies in its first week, making it the second-best-selling PS3 title in Japan for the week of 24–30 June 2013.
