= Tanaka-kun Is Always Listless =

2010s shōnen web manga and anime

- Cover of the first volume featuring title character, Tanaka.

田中くんはいつもけだるげ (Tanaka-kun wa Itsumo Kedaruge)
- Genre: Slice of life
- Manga
- Written by: Nozomi Uda
- Published by: Square Enix
- Magazine: Gangan Online
- Original run: July 25, 2013 – July 25, 2019
- Volumes: 13
- Anime television series
- Directed by: Shinya Kawatsura
- Written by: Akemi Omode
- Music by: Hiromi Mizutani
- Studio: Silver Link
- Licensed by: NA: Sentai Filmworks (expired)
- Original network: Tokyo MX, MBS, HTV, TVA, BS11
- Original run: April 9, 2016 – June 25, 2016
- Episodes: 12
- Original video animation
- Directed by: Shinya Kawatsura
- Written by: Akemi Omode
- Music by: Hiromi Mizutani
- Studio: Silver Link
- Released: June 24, 2016 – July 22, 2016
- Episodes: 7

Tanaka-kun Is Always Listless (田中くんはいつもけだるげ, Tanaka-kun wa Itsumo Kedaruge) is a Japanese slice of life shōnen web manga series written and illustrated by Nozomi Uda. It was published by Square Enix, being serialized on the Gangan Online website from July 2013 to July 2019. Thirteen volumes have been released as of September 2019. An anime adaptation by Silver Link aired from April 9 to June 25, 2016.

== Characters ==
Tanaka (田中)
Voiced by: Kensho Ono (Japanese); Blake Shepard (English)
Tanaka is listless student who is always dozing and acts exhausted when awake. He can sleep in almost any location, but prefers to be outside when he does so. His uncaring, sleepy nature forces Ohta to carry him to and from multiple locations quite often. Despite his general lack of enthusiasm, he shows on multiple occasions that he does not see friendship as bothersome, most specifically when Shiraishi pleaded with him to let her be his friend, he simply responded "I thought we already were." However, he finds the prospect of Miyano being his "apprentice" to be more trouble than it is worth. Despite being lazy, he is shown to score high in tests and is relatively strong as he threw a badminton racquet.
Ohta (太田)
Voiced by: Yoshimasa Hosoya (Japanese); Andrew Love (English)
Ota is a tall and stoic student, who is reliable and often looking after Tanaka. Tanaka states that because of Ohta's caring nature, he sees Ohta as the perfect candidate for marriage. He states on multiple occasions that he admires Tanaka's ability to be listless in any given situation, but also feels that Tanaka's personality causes him to miss out on things like romance and love.
Miyano (宮野)
Voiced by: Natsumi Takamori (Japanese); Monica Rial (English)
Miyano is Tanaka's classmate with short stature who admires Tanaka for his listless personality. She knows about Shiraishi's crush on Tanaka, and vows to support her in her quest for love, though Tanaka does not reciprocate her feelings. She constantly proclaims herself to be Tanaka's apprentice in listlessness, however he constantly decries her.
Echizen (越前)
Voiced by: Ayaka Suwa (Japanese); Luci Christian (English)
Ohta's short-tempered childhood friend who dresses and acts like a delinquent. She is Miyano's best friend and affectionately calls her "Myaano (みゃーの)." Despite her tomboyish manner, Echizen adores cute things, to the point where she refuses to eat sweets shaped like cute animals.
Shiraishi (白石)
Voiced by: Kotori Koiwai (Japanese); Stephanie Wittels (English)
A beautiful and intelligent student, she is very popular among both males and females. After Tanaka recognizes her when she isn't putting effort into her appearance (a short running theme in the show is that she looks completely different when she dresses herself more comfortably), she falls in love with Tanaka, believing that he is able to see her for who she is regardless of how she looks. (In reality, he was able to discern her in both forms of dress due to her bust size.) Tanaka, however, doesn't seem to reciprocate her feelings at all.
Rino Tanaka (田中 莉乃)
Voiced by: Aoi Yūki (Japanese); Brittney Karbowski (English)
Tanaka's sister. She is a middle school student who is the manager of the Volleyball Club of her school. She expresses a dislike towards Ohta, brought about by Ohta and Tanaka's close relationship, and sometimes gets jealous. She has a crush on her older brother, Tanaka.
Saya Ohta (太田 早夜)
Voiced by: Nao Tōyama (Japanese); Allison Sumrall (English)
Ohta's sister, who goes to same school as Rino. She is a shy person with an unusually small voice. She belongs to the Volleyball Club. In comparison to her brother's taller and heavier build, she states that Tanaka seems "prince-like" due to his pale, more slender features.
Shimura (志村)
Voiced by: Kazuyuki Okitsu (Japanese); Bryson Baugus (English)
Tanaka's classmate. He is cool and intelligent, but has a weakness for girls. He looks so different when not wearing eyeglasses that he cannot be recognized.
Katō (加藤)
Voiced by: Yūichi Iguchi (Japanese); Scott Gibbs (English)
Tanaka's classmate. He is good at sports and loves soccer.
Yoshitaka (吉高)

Voiced by: Haruka Nagamine (Japanese); Flecknoe Maggie (English). Alternate name: Ophelia Cox. One of Shiraishi's best friends. Her nickname is "Kitchan. A tall, boyish female student with short black hair, she was born on April 24th, 164 centimeters tall, and has type O blood. Together with Miyoshi, she supports Shiraishi's love life.

Saionji (西園寺)

Voiced by: Murakawa Rie (Japanese); Neves Emily (English) A college student with different part-time jobs.

== Media ==
=== Manga ===
No.	Release date	ISBN
01	April 26, 2014	978-4-7575-4286-0
02	July 22, 2014	978-4-7575-4354-6
03	November 22, 2014	978-4-7575-4474-1
04	May 22, 2015	978-4-7575-4642-4
05	November 21, 2015	978-4-7575-4796-4
06	April 4, 2016	978-4-7575-4947-0
07	September 9, 2016	978-4-7575-4971-5
08	April 22, 2017	978-4-7575-5317-0
09	September 22, 2017	978-4-7575-5478-8
10	March 22, 2018	978-4-7575-5655-3
11	September 21, 2018	978-4-7575-5846-5
12	March 22, 2019	978-4-7575-6055-0
13	September 12, 2019	978-4-7575-6268-4
13.5	September 12, 2019	978-4-7575-6285-1

=== Anime ===
An anime television series adaptation by Silver Link aired from April 9 to June 25, 2016, on Tokyo MX and MBS. The anime was directed by Shinya Kawatsura and written by Akemi Omode. The character designs were handled by Haruko Iizuka and the music was composed by Hiromi Mizutani. The opening theme is "Utatane Sunshine" (うたたねサンシャイン, Utatane Sanshain) by Unlimited Tone, while the ending theme is "Bonbon" by CooRie. The first and second home video release volumes bundled an OVA each, which were released on June 24 and July 22, 2016, respectively.

==== Episode list ====
No.	Title	Original release date
1	"Tanaka-kun and Ohta-kun" "Tanaka-kun to Ōta-kun" (田中くんと太田くん)	April 9, 2016
Tanaka Kyoji is a listless teenager who can fall asleep anywhere and seems to be exhausted even while awake. His chronic sleepiness means his best friend Ohta looks after him and frequently carries him from place to place. Tanaka notes that Ohta is actually a caring person ideal for marriage. Tanaka's sleepiness is such he considers it a philosophical approach to life, confusing his classmates as he seems to put great amounts of effort into being as lazy as possible. On one of his "double listless days" while sleepier than normal, Ohta notices he is listless that Tanaka loses his appetite, despite being obviously hungry. She mangages a sudden outburst despite the increased listless personality. With help from classmates, Shimura and Kato, Ohta determines Tanaka is in love. However, it soon becomes clear Tanaka's odd behaviour is actually his listless reaction to a tooth decay, so Ohta carries him to the dentist. When Tanaka lays out a plan to avoid cavities in the future just to avoid the effort of making it to the dentist, Ohta decides to completely support Tanaka's listless life.
2	"Apprenticeship Application" "Deshiiri Shigan" (弟子入り志願)	April 16, 2016
Ohta sees Tanaka at a shrine praying for peace; otherwise he will spread rumours about the local God, adding bribery and blackmail to his listless philosophy. Tanaka is approached by tiny classmate Miyano, who admires his listless lifestyle and wishes to become his apprentice. Tanaka agrees, deciding it costs less effort than constantly rejecting her, but Miyano's energetic personality makes her ill-suited to listlessness and she fails repeatedly. Miyano attempts to study listlessness in academics but Tanaka points out hard work proves how inappropriate to it she is. A few days later, Miyano seems to improve her listless personality instantly to even impress Tanaka. However, Miyano abruptly reverts to normal, revealing she had actually been worried about mascot costumes taking over the world, leaving Tanaka disappointed. When Miyano realizes how close she came to perfect listlessness, she decides to find another problem to worry about. Tanaka visits the shrine again and threatens to report the local God to a more senior God. The next day, he finds a duel challenge in his locker, ruining his peace once again.
3	"Girl of Contrast, Echizen-san" "Gyappu Shōjo Echizen-san" (ギャップ少女越前さん)	April 23, 2016
Ohta learns Tanaka only eats food that requires no effort. With Ohta's help he eats more than usual, making him sleepier than usual. Echizen, Ohta's childhood friend who challenged Tanaka, confronts him about ignoring her duel summons. Tanaka refuses to duel as his listlessness means he will lose, making competition pointless. Echizen forces him to play Othello and Ohta notices Tanaka's listlessness makes enemies lose fighting spirit. Echizen wins but is irritated that Tanaka spelled the word "White" with his pieces, suggesting he could win easily if he wanted. Echizen demands to know why her best friend, Miyano, is obsessed with someone so listless. Miyano appears and Echizen's true personality emerges, revealing she loves cute things. Miyano's respect for Tanaka makes Echizen want to challenge him even more, ruining his peace. Miyano becomes upset after Echizen refused to eat rabbit cookies she made, thinking them too cute, and they went mouldy. Tanaka suggests writing an apology, but it ends up sounding like another duel summons. Echizen learns about Miyano trying to match her personality with someone she admires, and Miyano ends up admitting she admires Echizen and they reconcile. Miyano starts making ugly sweets for Echizen to eat them. Tanaka looks forward to a peaceful future.
4	"Shiraishi-san's Secret" "Shiraishi-san no Himitsu" (白石さんの秘密)	April 30, 2016
Tanaka and Ohta cross paths with Shiraishi, the beautiful and popular class president. Having accidentally torn her paperwork, the boys help reprint the pages. Tanaka begins to fall asleep so Ohta takes him home. Now alone, Shiraishi relaxes dramatically: changing her outfit, swapping contacts for glasses, and putting her hair in a ponytail. It transpires her class president persona was designed to make her popular, despite feeling uncomfortable all day. Tanaka and Ohta return unexpectedly and see her but leave without reacting while Shiraishi panics. She is surprised when they tell no one her secret, but assumes they are planning blackmail. While eavesdropping, she realizes Ohta does not actually recognize her, and Tanaka was asleep so she decides to test her camouflage by walking around in her relaxed persona. She is completely ignored until Tanaka somehow recognises her, causing Ohta to realize as well. Much to her surprise, Tanaka respects her effort when compared to his listless personality, so she decides to relax slightly and starts wearing glasses in public. Ohta wonders how Tanaka could recognize her when he barely pays attention to anything and starts to develop a crush on him. Meanwhile, Tanaka reveals to Ohta he recognized Shiraishi even when relaxed due to her breasts.
5	"Tanaka-kun's Day" "Tanaka-kun no Nichijō" (田中くんの日常)	May 7, 2016
Tanaka forgets what item his sister asked him to buy and realises both he and Ohta have younger sisters. Ohta's knowledge of household skills and smart shopping habits draws attention from potential mother-in-laws. Assuming Tanaka's sister knows how unreliable he is, Ohta deduces she wanted Tanaka to buy limited edition pancakes. However, the next day, Tanaka stinks and explains his sister actually wanted pipe cleaner for the shower and was so mad he bought pancakes she fed him smelly food. Meanwhile, the more relaxed Shiraishi finds herself drawn to Tanaka and wonders if she is in love with him. She asks Ohta's advice as only he understands Tanaka, but Ohta admits Tanaka has never shown interest in girls. Ohta realizes Shiraishi has a crush on Tanaka and secretly wishes her luck. Shiraishi decides to become friends with Tanaka before confessing, only to realize he is already friends with Miyano and loses her confidence. Miyano assumes Shiraishi also wants to be a listlessness apprentice but Shiraishi instead asks to be his friend, confusing Tanaka who assumed they were friends already. Shiraishi happily swaps email with Tanaka and Miyano, only to receive an email from Miyano secretly supporting her love for Tanaka.
6	"The Sick Tanaka-kun" "Kazehiki Tanaka-kun" (風邪ひき田中くん)	May 14, 2016
Tanaka does not use his umbrella because it takes too much effort; resulting in him getting drenched multiple times trying to evolve immunity to rain or dodge raindrops like a ninja. Shiraishi offers to share her umbrella, but is nervous that she increases the distance between them, causing Tanaka to be drenched again and he finally catches a cold. Unable to speak, Tanaka decides to use a notepad. However, when Tanaka tries to tell Echizen to change her name to something that takes less effort to write, she thinks he is asking her to marry either him or Ohta. The next day, Echizen's belief of both Tanaka and Ohta want to marry her leaves her flustered and confused. She decides Tanaka's family name sounds better, but when she sprains her ankle Ohta is tall enough to carry her like a princess, causing her to become attracted to him and panic, so he drops her on her head. She finally explains why she has been acting strangely and Tanaka realises she misunderstood his asking her to change her name. Echizen is furious she spent all day confused because of Tanaka's laziness, but returns to being embarrassed when they decide to nickname her "Ecchan" as it is easier to say and write.
7	"Tanaka-kun's Valentine" "Tanaka-kun no Barentain" (田中くんのバレンタイン)	May 21, 2016
Tanaka receives anonymous valentine chocolates, depressing him as it means he has to put effort into giving a gift in return on White Day. Ohta is mildly depressed when he receives cheaper quality bitter dark chocolate, but things turn sinister when Tanaka finds a threatening note. Ohta suspects it may be Miyano but discounts this when Miyano gives chocolate to Echizen but admits she forgot Tanaka and Ohta's. After tasting Tanaka's quality chocolate Ohta suspects it was homemade by Shiraishi, but overhears her admitting she had completely forgotten about Valentine's Day. Walking home they discover a sinister recording device in Tanaka's bag before being confronted by Tanaka's sister, Rino. She admits the device is something she uses for study purposes but put it in Tanaka's bag by mistake. She invites Ohta to their home but treats him with mild hostility after hearing about their friendship and how he ate some of Tanaka's chocolate, which she made. After he leaves she secretly reveals her feelings for Tanaka and swears she will not let Ohta take him from her. Meanwhile, Tanaka naively believes Rino was actually being nice to Ohta for being his friend. Rino is furious that all she can hear on her device is Ohta as Tanaka's voice is too soft for the device to record it properly.
8	"Ohta-kun's Ordeal" "Ōta-kun no Junan" (太田くんの受難)	May 28, 2016
Ohta has a rare sick day and Tanaka volunteers to take his homework, despite forgetting his address, and asks an irritated Echizen for help as she lives next door. On his way there, Echizen speaks to several people and Tanaka realizes Echizen is liked by people in her neighborhood, despite her delinquent personality. After Ohta returns to school with a sprained ankle Tanaka decides to look after Ohta for once but due to his listless personality, it is only useful as a crutch to support Ohta moving around, slowly. Echizen gives Ohta some of her lunch but panics when Miyano almost reveals she bought food especially for Ohta. Due to the extra effort Tanaka is determined to sleep and begins completing his work at incredible speed, but is forced to stay awake after his speed results in many incorrect answers. The school has a fire drill but Tanaka is so used to Ohta carrying him he gets lost trying to find his way outside. For Tanaka's safety Ohta decides to never be injured again. Tanaka realizes how much he relies on Ohta and decides to create Ohta Appreciation Day, gifting him a coupon book he can use to force Tanaka to sometimes do things on his own, but this is rendered useless straight away as Ohta has to carry him to get to class on time.
9	"Welcome to Wac" "Wakku e Yōkoso" (ワックへようこそ)	June 4, 2016
Tanaka is reluctant to visit WcDonalds with Ohta until he realises they are offering robot vacuums as a free giveaway, but becomes depressed after they run out. He orders a milkshake but cannot muster the effort needed to suck it up the straw. Meanwhile, the waitress, intimidated by Tanaka's listless stare, is further intimidated by Ohta's naturally terrifying aura, only to be surprised when they politely thank her. They visit again the next day but Ohta leaves to fetch his forgotten phone. Tanaka is spotted by his sister and her nervous friend Saya. Rino is happy she can spend time with Tanaka in public without Ohta. Saya reveals she has an older brother who is much larger and more gorilla-like than Tanaka, but she prefers Tanaka for his "dark prince" looks. The waitress is further intimidated after meeting Rino, believing she is a Tanaka clone. Ohta returns and it turns out he is Saya's brother. Saya wonders at the coincidence of being friends with everyone's siblings, while Rino is irritated at seeing Ohta again. After everyone returns home Ohta notices Saya is unusually happy, while Tanaka has a full stomach from WcDonalds, causing Rino to blame Ohta for her missing out on having dinner alone with Tanaka.
10	"Tanaka-kun's Summer" "Tanaka-kun no Natsu" (田中くんの夏)	June 11, 2016
Tanaka suggests visiting a pool, despite not knowing how to swim and must use an inflatable. Two boys burst his inflatable, causing Ohta to realise Tanaka's listlessness makes him float without effort. The WcDonalds waitress, who is also a lifeguard, is too nervous to say anything. The next day they meet the boys again who reveals listless floating has become a fad at their junior school. Miyano asks Tanaka to help her grow 10cm as Echizen has invited her to a firework festival, but she always looks like a child in costume when she wears a yukata. As growing is impossible, Tanaka suggests they stay at home and watch fireworks on TV, but Ohta suggests she search for a yukata that makes her look mature despite her height. Miyano takes Tanaka, Ohta and Shiraishi shopping. Shiraishi is happy when Tanaka compliments her new yukata but cannot go with them as she is already going with other friends. Miyano fails to find a yukata so Shiraishi sews her one from scratch which Miyano loves. During the festival, Echizen is surprised when Ohta compliments her in her yukata, but when she tries to compliment him he is distracted by food stalls, so she pours shaved ice over his head.
11	"Tanaka-kun's Culture Festival" "Tanaka-kun no Bunkasai" (田中くんの文化祭)	June 18, 2016
Tanaka's class is chosen to create the haunted house for the cultural festival, Tanaka's least favorite festival due to the effort required. Tanaka is chosen to play the ghost, though he is so bad at acting Miyano comes up with a way for him to look scary while sitting still. Shiraishi provides costumes but is embarrassed when Tanaka flashes his underwear while changing. With the haunted house finished everyone prepares to receive customers, but Ohta is reluctant to play his part as he is secretly terrified of ghosts. Miyano tries to replace him but her performance comes across as cute instead of scary. Tanaka ends up being the scariest ghost despite being asleep. When the haunted house closes for a break Tanaka tries to find somewhere to sleep only to stumble on an irritated Echizen playing a maid in a café. He continues wandering in a listless way and goes missing, forcing Kato to replace him as the ghost. Ohta goes looking for Tanaka and finds him in a dark staircase inside a cardboard box, scaring him horribly he passes out. Tanaka decides to guard Ohta until he wakes up but ends up falling asleep again until after the festival has ended. The next day, rumors spread that a real ghost was seen wandering the school, scaring Ohta so badly he buys salt to purify the building.
12	"Tanaka-kun's Happiness" "Tanaka-kun no shiawase" (田中くんのしあわせ)	June 25, 2016
Tanaka despairs when he is moved to the front row, until Miyano points out she cannot see from her new seat behind Ohta, so a lucky Tanaka quickly swaps seats to sleep behind Ohta. This places him beside Shiraishi who is determined to become closer to Tanaka but can barely start a conversation before he falls asleep or Ohta interrupts. Tanaka eventually tells her watching him makes him uncomfortable, depressing her, until he also tells her patience is a good thing. Shimura and Kato see Tanaka with Shiraishi in her comfortable outfit and accuse Tanaka of having a secret girlfriend. Tanaka is subjected to many annoying questions that eventually cause him to snap at his friends. A guilty Shiraishi tries to explain but is stopped by Miyano who mistakenly thinks she is heartbroken about Tanaka's girlfriend. Ohta asks Echizen if he can carry her around as a Tanaka replacement, causing her to punch him as she thought he was going to confess to her. Walking home alone Tanaka is subjected to many annoying distractions he could have avoided if his friends were there, making him miss them. Ohta realises the girl was a relaxed Shiraishi and provides a believable explanation. The next day everyone apologises and Shiraishi thanks Ohta for saving Tanaka. However, she is depressed when Tanaka decides girlfriends definitely cause too much drama for him to ever want one, but she decides to carry on being patient anyway.

== Reception ==
The manga has sold 1 million copies in Japan as of November 2015. Volume 2 reached the 32nd place on the weekly Oricon manga charts and, as of July 27, 2014, had sold 37,291 copies; volume 3 reached the 16th place and, as of November 30, 2014, had sold 63,079 copies. It was tied at 17th place on the 2015 Kono Manga ga Sugoi! Top 20 Manga for Female Readers survey. It was also placed 4th on Zenkoku Shotenin ga Eranda Osusume Comic 2015.
