= Rie Murakawa =

Japanese voice actress and singer

- 村川 梨衣
- Born: June 1, 1990 (age 36); Saitama Prefecture, Japan
- Occupations: Voice actress; singer; radio personality
- Years active: 2011–present
- Agent: Stay Luck
- Notable work: Non Non Biyori as Hotaru Ichijō; Atelier Escha & Logy: Alchemists of the Dusk Sky as Escha Malier; Etotama as Nyaa-tan; Brave Witches as Naoe Kanno; Re:Zero − Starting Life in Another World as Ram; Komi Can't Communicate as Najimi Osana
- Height: 1.52 m (5 ft 0 in)
- Musical career
- Genre: J-pop
- Instrument: Vocals
- Years active: 2016–present
- Label: Nippon Columbia

Rie Murakawa (村川 梨衣, Murakawa Rie; born June 1, 1990) is a Japanese voice actress, singer and radio personality from Saitama Prefecture, Japan. She is currently affiliated with Stay Luck. She is known for her roles as Hotaru Ichijō in Non Non Biyori, Escha Malier in Atelier Escha & Logy: Alchemists of the Dusk Sky, and Ram in Re:Zero − Starting Life in Another World.

Murakawa made her solo debut as singer on June 1, 2016, with the double A-side single "Sweet Sensation/Baby, My First Kiss", released under the Nippon Columbia record label. Her stints hosting the radio programs Etotama Radio ~ Soruraru Kure Nya! ~ and Non Non Biyori Web Radio Non Non Dayori Repeat! Nanon led her to winning the Best Funny Radio (Rookie) and Best Comfort Radio (General) awards at the 2nd Aniraji Awards in 2016. She released her first solo album in January 2017, and she released her second solo album in February 2018.

== Biography ==
=== Early life ===
Murakawa was born in Saitama Prefecture on June 1, 1990. From an early age, she had an interest in playing games as well as magical girl anime such as Sailor Moon and Magic Knight Rayearth. During her fifth grade of elementary school, she transferred to another school, an event that years later she would later cite as a common point with her character Hotaru Ichijō in the anime series Non Non Biyori.

Also during her fifth grade of elementary school, Murakawa started becoming interested in voice acting after watching the anime series Hunter × Hunter (1999), which had been recommended to her by an older cousin. She was inspired by the voice acting performance of Yuki Kaida as the character Kurapika, and she also became interested in the voice of the series' main character, Gon Freecss. After this, she attempted to find ways to audition for voice acting roles, but was stopped. However, her parents promised her that they would let her become a voice actress in the future.

During her junior high school years, Murakawa attempted to join her school's theater club as a first step towards pursuing a voice acting career, but eventually abandoned this and instead joined the school's basketball club, which she would remain part of for three years. She then decided to enroll in a high school with a thriving theater club to help develop her acting skills. After graduating from high school, she enrolled at the vocational college Human Academy in 2009. Following her graduation from Human Academy in 2011, she enrolled at the Haikyō's voice acting school, finishing her studies that same year.

=== Acting career ===
After becoming a part of the Tokyo Actor's Consumer's Cooperative Society following her graduation from their acting school, Murakawa began playing roles in anime series. Her first anime role was as the character Coco in the 80th episode of the anime series Fairy Tail. She would continue to play supporting roles until 2013, when she was cast in her first main role as Aoi Futaba in the anime series Vividred Operation. That same year, she played a role in the anime film Hunter × Hunter: Phantom Rouge, which greatly pleased her as Hunter × Hunter was what originally inspired her to become a voice actress. Later that year, she was cast as Hotaru Ichijō in the anime series Non Non Biyori, and Escha Malier in the video game Atelier Escha & Logy: Alchemists of the Dusk Sky.

In 2014, Murakawa reprised the role of Escha for the anime series adaptation of Atelier Escha & Logy: Alchemists of the Dusk Sky. She also played the role of Megumi Natsu in Is the Order a Rabbit? and Ruri Aoi in Minarai Diva. In 2015, she was cast as the role Nyaa-tan in Etotama, and in 2016 she played the role of Ram in Re:Zero − Starting Life in Another World In 2017, she played the role of Constanze in Little Witch Academia, and in 2018 she played the role of Anzu in Hinamatsuri.

In 2019, she voiced Eyeone, a major villain in Star Twinkle PreCure, the 16th season of the Pretty Cure franchise. Murakawa has announced her interest in voicing a mainstream Pretty Cure.

On October 1, 2020, Murakawa transferred from Haikyō to Stay Luck.

=== Music career ===
Murakawa's music career began with the release of her first single "Sweet Sensation/Baby, My First Kiss" on June 1, 2016; the song "Sweet Sensation" was used as opening theme to the anime series Age 12: A Little Heart-Pounding. Her second single "Dokidoki no Kaze" (ドキドキの風) was released on November 2, 2016; the title track is used as the ending theme to the anime series Kiss Him, Not Me. She released her first album RiEMUSiC on January 11, 2017. This was followed by two singles that year: "Tiny Tiny"/"Mizuiro no Fantasy" (水色のFantasy) on May 17, and "Night terror" on October 11; "Tiny Tiny" was used as the opening theme to the anime series Frame Arms Girl, She released her second album RiESiNFONiA on February 28, 2018, and she released the single "Distance" on May 23, 2018; the song "Distance" was used as the opening theme to Hinamatsuri. She released the single "Hajimari no Basho" (はじまりの場所) on February 20, 2019; the title song is used as the ending theme to the anime series Forest of Piano. In the second season of Re:Zero − Starting Life in Another World anime, the song "Anata no Shiranai Koto" (あなたの知らないこと) was used as the insert song in episode 23.

== Personal life ==
Murakawa has an older sister and a younger brother. Voice actors who are close to her include Ayane Sakura, Aya Uchida, Mikako Komatsu, Maaya Uchida, Nozomi Yamamoto, Hiromi Igarashi, Minami Tsuda, and Yoshino Nanjō. When she and Aya Uchida appear together on TV programs, Uchida treats the high-spirited Murakawa like she's an idiot by saying, "Riesson, shut up! This has become a common practice. In response, Uchida said, "Aya-san always says, 'Shut up! But I think she really loves me, and I love her too. In the December 2013 issue of Seiyuu Grand Prix, she and Uchida participated in "Majitomo," a project in which two voice actors who are good friends of each other discuss the trajectory of their relationship since they met. in which she and Uchida were featured together.

== Filmography ==
=== TV animation ===
2011

- Fairy Tail, Coco

2012

- Code:Breaker, Girl (ep 13)
- Fairy Tail, Beth Vanderwood
- Say "I love you", Girl (ep 5)
- Shining Hearts: Shiawase no Pan, Child 1

2013

- AKB0048 next stage, Research student A
- A Certain Scientific Railgun S, Voice, Female Student B (ep 13), Client (ep 22)
- Hyperdimension Neptunia: The Animation, Child
- Kin-iro Mosaic, Mitsuki Inokuma, Female High School Student B (ep 2)
- Non Non Biyori, Hotaru Ichijō
- Oreshura, Female student A (ep 2)
- Futari wa Milky Holmes, Alice's small bird, Girl C
- The Severing Crime Edge, Female student (ep 2)
- Unbreakable Machine-Doll, Female Student (ep 2)
- Vividred Operation, Aoi Futaba
- Yuyushiki, Female student 1 (ep 1), Kōhai B (ep 9)
- Yozakura Quartet ~Hana no Uta~, 2nd District Girl B (ep 1), Girl 1, Girl

2014

- Atelier Escha & Logy: Alchemists of the Dusk Sky, Escha Malier
- Bladedance of Elementalers, Student (eps 1, 5)
- Dragon Collection, Miss Dragonia, Green Puppy
- Fairy Tail (2014), Beth Vanderwood
- Is the Order a Rabbit?, Megumi Natsu
- Log Horizon 2, Lizé, Pianississimo
- Magica Wars, Rin Kobari
- Maken-Ki! Two, Black Rabbit
- Minarai Diva, Ruri Aoi
- Nanana's Buried Treasure, Kamone Misaki
- Nano Invaders as Take
- Parasyte -the maxim-, Misaki
- SoniAni: Super Sonico The Animation, Hibiki Komatsuri
- Trinity Seven, Yui Kurata
- Wake Up, Girls!, Maid
- When Supernatural Battles Became Commonplace, Umeko Tanaka
- Your Lie in April, Participant, Female student
- Z/X Ignition, Quon (Cait Sith)

2015

- Etotama, Nyaa-tan
- Is It Wrong to Try to Pick Up Girls in a Dungeon?, Tiona Hiryute
- Is the Order a Rabbit??, Megumi Natsu
- Hello!! Kin-iro Mosaic, Mitsuki Inokuma
- Non Non Biyori Repeat, Hotaru Ichijō
- Rin-ne, Ageha
- Show by Rock!!, Jacqueline
- Wakaba Girl, Nao Hashiba
- Yurikuma Arashi, Chōko Oki

2016

- Brave Witches, Naoe Kanno
- Magic of Stella, Shiina Murakami
- Pandora in the Crimson Shell: Ghost Urn, Bunny
- Phantasy Star Online 2 The Animation, Mika Konoe
- Re:Zero − Starting Life in Another World, Ram
- Show by Rock!! Short!!, Jacqueline
- Show by Rock!! #, Jacqueline
- Tanaka-kun Is Always Listless, Saionji

2017

- Action Heroine Cheer Fruits, Roko Kuroki
- Chain Chronicle ~Light of Haecceitas~, Kiki
- Is It Wrong to Try to Pick Up Girls in a Dungeon?: Sword Oratoria, Tiona Hiryute
- Little Witch Academia, Constanze Amalie von Braunschbank-Albrechtsberger, Wangari
- One Room, Natsuki Momohara
- Schoolgirl Strikers: Animation Channel, Haruka Kurimoto
- PriPri Chi-chan!!, Chi-chan
- Re:Creators, Mamika Kirameki
- Tsuki ga Kirei, Chinatsu Nishio

2018

- Caligula, Kotono Kashiwaba
- Shinkansen Henkei Robo Shinkalion, Tsuranuki Daimonyama

2019

- Isekai Quartet, Ram
- My Hero Academia 4, Kaoruko Awata
- One Room Second Season, Natsuki Momohara
- Pastel Memories, Yuina Machiya
- Star Twinkle PreCure, Eyeone

2020

- Re:Zero − Starting Life in Another World 2nd Season, Ram
- The God of High School, Saturn
- One Room Third Season, Natsuki Momohara

2021

- LBX Girls, Yui
- Show by Rock!! Stars!!, Jacqueline
- Non Non Biyori Nonstop, Hotaru Ichijō
- Log Horizon: Destruction of the Round Table, Lizé
- Komi Can't Communicate, Najimi Osana

2022

- I'm the Villainess, So I'm Taming the Final Boss, Rachel Danis

=== Original net animation (ONA) ===
- KY kei JC Kuuki-chan (2013), Kuuki Yominashi
- Monster Strike (2015), Karin Homura
- Devils' Crest (2026), Kai Kisanuki

=== Original video animation (OVA) ===
- Non Non Biyori OVA (2014), Hotaru Ichijō
- Trinity Seven OVA (2015), Yui Kurata
- Nekota no Koto ga Ki ni Natte Shikatanai OVA (2015), Haruna Inui
- Robot Atom (2015), Atom
- Non Non Biyori Repeat OVA (2016), Hotaru Ichijō

=== Theatrical animation ===
- Hunter × Hunter: Phantom Rouge (2013)
- Little Witch Academia: The Enchanted Parade (2015), Constanze Amalie von Braunschbank-Albrechtsberger
- Kiniro Mosaic: Pretty Days (2016), Mitsuki Inokuma
- Trinity Seven the Movie: The Eternal Library and the Alchemist Girl (2017), Yui Kurata
- Non Non Biyori Vacation (2018), Hotaru Ichijo
- Trinity Seven: Heavens Library & Crimson Lord (2019), Yui Kurata

=== Video games ===
- Lord of Vermilion Re:2 (2011), Ishtar
- Pop'n Music Portable 2 (2011), Mimi
- Atelier Escha & Logy: Alchemists of the Dusk Sky (2013), Escha Malier
- Final Fantasy XIV: A Realm Reborn (2013 - Present), Alisaie
- Girl Friend Beta (2013), Tsudzuri Shirase
- Lord of Vermilion III (2013), Wu Zetian
- The Idolm@ster Million Live! (2013), Arisa Matsuda
- Valkyria Chronicles Duel (2013), Loretta Rembrandt
- Vividred Operation: Hyper Intimate Power (2013), Aoi Futaba
- Yome Collection (2013), Aoi Futaba
- Atelier Shallie: Alchemists of the Dusk Sea (2014), Escha Malier
- Fire Emblem If (2015), Kagerou
- Moe Chronicle (2014), Lilia
- Grimoire: Grimoire Private Magic School (2014)
- Magica Wars Zanbatsu (2014), Rin Kobari
- Oreshika: Tainted Bloodlines (2014)
- Schoolgirl Strikers (2014), Haruka Kurimoto
- SoniPro (2014), Hibiki Komatsuri
- Island (2016) - Sara Garando
- The Caligula Effect (2016), Kotono Kashiwaba
- Band Yarouze! (2016), Mint
- Fire Emblem Echoes: Shadows of Valentia (2017), Est
- Fire Emblem Heroes (2017), Kagerou, Est
- Little Witch Academia: Chamber of Time (2017), Constanze Amalie von Braunschbank-Albrechtsberger, Wangari
- Re:Zero -Starting Life in Another World- Death or Kiss (2017), Ram
- Another Eden (2019), Melina
- Arknights (2019), Absinthe
- Magia Record (2019), Matsuri Hinata
- Tokyo Afterschool Summoners (2020), Ellie
- Girls' Frontline (2021), Browning HP-35 & Colt Defender

== Discography ==
=== Singles ===
Release date	Title	Catalog No.			Peak Oricon chart positions	Album
Release date	Title	Limited Edition		Regular Edition	Peak Oricon chart positions	Album
Release date	Title	A	B	Regular Edition	Peak Oricon chart positions	Album
June 1, 2016	"Sweet Sensation/Baby, My First Kiss"	COZC-1164/5	COZC-1166/7	COCC-17126	13	RiEMUSiC
November 2, 2016	"Dokidoki no Kaze" (ドキドキの風)	COZC-1250/1		COCC-17137	27	RiEMUSiC
May 17, 2017	"Tiny Tiny"/"Mizuiro no Fantasy" (水色のFantasy)	COZC-1312/3	COZC-1314/5	COCC-17259	14	RiESiNFONiA
October 11, 2017	"Night terror"	COZC-1373/4		COCC-17343	16	RiESiNFONiA
May 23, 2018	"Distance"	COZC-1440/1		COCC-17456	28	TBA

=== Albums ===
Release date	Album details	Catalog No.			Peak Oricon chart positions
Release date	Album details	Limited Edition		Regular Edition	Peak Oricon chart positions
Release date	Album details	A	B	Regular Edition	Peak Oricon chart positions
January 11, 2017	RiEMUSiC: Label: Nippon Columbia; Format: CD	COZX-1270/1		COCX-39786	17
February 28, 2018	RiESiNFONiA: Label: Nippon Columbia; Format: CD	COZX-1414/5	COZX-1416/7	COCX-40277	20
