= Miho Arakawa =

Japanese voice actress

- 荒川 美穂
- Born: December 4, 1987 (age 38); Sendai, Miyagi Prefecture, Japan
- Occupation: Voice actress
- Years active: 2010–present
- Agent: Tokyo Actor's Consumer's Cooperative Society
- Height: 149 cm (4 ft 11 in)

Miho Arakawa (荒川 美穂, Arakawa Miho; born December 4, 1987) is a Japanese voice actress affiliated with Tokyo Actor's Consumer's Cooperative Society.

== Career ==
A group member of Hamiradi, Arakawa attended Haikyo Voice Actors Studio and was part of the 36th graduating class. She worked as a nurse until 2011.

== Personal life ==
In July 2022, Arakawa announced her marriage and pregnancy with her first child.

== Filmography ==
=== Anime series ===
Year	Title	Role	Notes	Source
2011	Penguindrum	Himari Takakura		
2011	Ben-To	Shopgirl		
2012	Hunter × Hunter	Shizuku, Eliza		
2013	Hakkenden: Eight Dogs of the East series	Chikage		
2013	Straight Title Robot Anime	Katō		
2013	Coppelion	Miku Kawabata	Ep. "Future"	
2014	Wizard Barristers	Tsunomi Kabutohara		
2014	HappinessCharge PreCure!	Sachiyo		
2014	Riddle Story of Devil	Sumireko Hanabusa		
2014	Magica Wars	Naruko Aoba		
2014	Girl Friend Beta	Makoto Hiiragi		
2015	Yurikuma Arashi	Ginko Yurishiro		
2015	Battle Spirits: Burning Soul	Tenmashi		
2015	My Love Story!!	Rei		
2016	Danganronpa 3: The End of Hope's Peak High School	Sonia Nevermind	Despair arc	

=== Anime films ===
Year	Title	Role	Notes	Source
2013	Hunter × Hunter: Phantom Rouge	Shizuku		
2014	Okinawa Churaumi Aquarium: A Message from the Sea	Hiroshi Isomura (brother)	live-action documentary film	
2015–18	Digimon Adventure tri.	Meiko Mochizuki		
2022	Re:cycle of Penguindrum	Himari Takakura		

=== Video games ===
Year	Title	Role	Notes	Source
2012	Danganronpa 2: Goodbye Despair	Sonia Nevermind	PSP, also Reload in 2013	
2012	Girl Friend Beta	Makoto Hiiragi		
2013	Lord of Vermillion III	Sakuya Konohana		
2014	Magica Wars games	Naruko Aoba		
2014	Granblue Fantasy	Claudia		
2015	Norn9: Last Era	Kazuha Kagami		
2015	Natsuiro High School: Seishun Hakusho	Ranko Koriyama		
2015	Moero Crystal	Tet		
2019	Arknights	Ceylon	Mobile	

=== Audio dramas ===
Title	Role	Notes	Source
Comical Psychosomatic Medicine	Iyashi Kangoshi		
Tsuki! Tsuki!	Minami Ouka		
