= Magica Wars =

Japanese media franchise

- Promotional image.

魔法少女大戦 (Mahō Shōjo Taisen)
- Created by: Ken Matsui; Momoka Ito; Gainax
- Video game

Magica Wars Lock-On
- Platform: iOS
- Released: December 20, 2013
- Video game

Magica Wars Tactics
- Developer: DMM Games
- Platform: Adobe Flash
- Released: January 2014
- Video game

Magica Wars Zanbatsu
- Platform: PlayStation Vita
- Released: March 27, 2014
- Anime television series
- Directed by: Ayano Ohnoki
- Written by: Kazuho Hyodo
- Music by: Hiroshi Watanabe
- Studio: Gainax
- Licensed by: Crunchyroll (expired)
- Original network: Tokyo MX, BS11
- Original run: April 8, 2014 – September 30, 2014
- Episodes: 26

Magica Wars (魔法少女大戦, Mahō Shōjo Taisen; lit. 'Magical Girl Wars') is a media franchise created by the internet television variety show 2.5 Jigen Terebi. It consists of an iOS game titled Magica Wars Lock-On which was released on December 20, 2013; a free-to-play smartphone browser game by DMM Games titled Magica Wars Tactics, released in January 2014; a PlayStation Vita game was released on March 27, 2014; and an anime television series by Gainax that aired on April 8, 2014.

The franchise personifies Japan's 47 prefectures, each one being represented by a magical girl. The character designs are determined via a contest on the art website Pixiv. The voice actress for each girl was born in the prefecture that they represent.

== Story ==
A dragon sleeps under ground in the land. When it is asleep, it brings abundance to the harvest on the land, but it brings disaster when awake.

In every decade or every hundred years, the dragon moves its body as if it tosses about unconsciously. The movement becomes a distortion and causes impurity. This "impurity" forms the corrupted being known as Magatsuhi (マガツヒ, Magatsuhi), which brings an evil upon people. And now, an Magatsuhi outbreak of distortion spreads across the prefectures of Japan.

The disaster was foreseen by the Gods who saw that the greatest harm would happen to Japan. They divided their own power and gave it as a messenger of God (御先神, Shinshi) in Japan inorder to gather mediums, or "Magica" who can expel the "impurity" and exorcise Magatsuhi. With the magical weapon, the power of Gods, the "Magica" fight to stop these evils in Japan.

== Characters ==
Naruko Aoba (青葉 鳴子, Aoba Naruko)
Voiced by: Miho Arakawa
Representative of Miyagi Prefecture.
Takesuzume (タケスズメ)
Voiced by: Kōichi Yamadera
Representative of Miyagi Prefecture.
Rin Kobari (小張 凛, Kobari Rin) / Kobarin (こばりん)
Voiced by: Rie Murakawa
Representative of Tokyo Prefecture.
Mosuke (モ助)
Voiced by: Satomi Arai
Representative of Tokyo Prefecture.
Yuri Inuwashi (犬鷲 由里, Inuwashi Yuri) / Magia Furumine (マジア・フルミネ)
Voiced by: Ryōko Shintani
Representative of Ishikawa Prefecture.
Shishiku (ししく)
Voiced by: Ryōta Takeuchi
Representative of Ishikawa Prefecture.
Matsuri Sengen (浅間 まつり, Sengen Matsuri)
Voiced by: Yoshino Nanjō
Representative of Shizuoka Prefecture.
Toro (トロ)
Voiced by: Mitsuo Iwata
Representative of Shizuoka Prefecture.
Suzuka Kamiki (神木 鈴花, Kamiki Suzuka) / Magical Triple (マジカル三重県（トリプル）, Majikaru Toripuru)
Voiced by: Mikako Komatsu
Representative of Mie Prefecture.
Ebizō (エビゾウ)
Voiced by: Shigeru Chiba
Representative of Mie Prefecture.
Mebuki Konoe (近衛 めぶき, Konoe Mebuki)
Voiced by: Kotori Koiwai
Representative of Kyoto Prefecture.
Oage-san (おあげさん)
Voiced by: Arisa Nishiguchi
Representative of Kyoto Prefecture.
Renka Ariake (有明 煉華, Ariake Renka) / Ren (れん)
Voiced by: Yuka Terasaki
Representative of Kumamoto Prefecture.
Esora (笑空)
Voiced by: Kappei Yamaguchi
Representative of Kumamoto Prefecture.
Amane Sakaki (榊天音, Sakaki Amane)
Voiced by: Haruna Ikezawa
Main protagonist of Zanbatsu.

== Production ==
=== Development ===
Magica Wars is a concept created by the Web-based otaku-oriented news program 2.5 Jigen Terebi as an original content project that aims to create characters based on the 47 prefectures of Japan. It began as a character design contest for each of the 47 prefectures, and is currently composed of three games, an anime series and a manga serialization.

The Magica Wars concept started development on June 28, 2012, coinciding the premiere of 2.5 Jigen Terebi. Using the concept of "livening up one's locale", a character design contest was hosted on the illustration SNS Pixiv during June 28 to August 8 wherein each entry consists of a magical girl and her familiar. By the end of the contest, a staggering 3,248 entries from Japan and other countries joined the period. Of these entries, 60 were chosen as official designs for the magical girls that would represent the 47 prefectures of Japan and Taiwan, with 3D sprites especially made for three of these entries, which are representatives for the Miyagi, Aomori and Kanagawa prefectures.

After the selection of the 60 entries from the character design contest, three games were green-lit for release. Two of these games, Magica Wars Lock On! and Magica Wars Tactics, were designed for smartphones, while a third, Magica Wars Zanbatsu, is released for the PlayStation Vita handheld console. An anime series and a manga based on the concept were also green-lit. Each project has a different number of cast of Magical Girls, the anime and manga having the fewest featured. The Zanbatsu game featured 47 prefecture magical girls, two original girls, the amnesiac protagonist Sakaki Amane and another original character Maki Inada who gives the amnesiac Amane her name and is the first person who Amane meets; also guest starring in Zanbatsu are some Magatsuhi-corrupted magical girl cast from Lock-On as antagonists. The Zanbatsu game ended service on December 22, 2015, after slightly over a year's run from March 2014.

== Anime ==
=== Episode list ===
No.	Title	Original release date
1	"Miyagi Prefecture: The Case of Naruko Aoba Part 1" "Miyagi-ken: Aoba Naruko no baai" (Episode 1 宮城県: 青葉鳴子の場合)	April 8, 2014
2	"Miyagi Prefecture: The Case of Naruko Aoba Part 2" "Miyagi-ken: Aoba Naruko no baai" (Episode 1 宮城県: 青葉鳴子の場合)	April 15, 2014
3	"Miyagi Prefecture: The Case of Naruko Aoba Part 3" "Miyagi-ken: Aoba Naruko no baai" (Episode 1 宮城県: 青葉鳴子の場合)	April 22, 2014
4	"Shizuoka Prefectore: The Case of Matsuri Sengen Part 1" "Shizuoka-ken: Sengen Matsuri no baai" (Episode 2 静岡県: 浅間まつりの場合)	April 29, 2014
5	"Shizuoka Prefectore: The Case of Matsuri Sengen Part 2" "Shizuoka-ken: Sengen Matsuri no baai" (Episode 2 静岡県: 浅間まつりの場合)	May 6, 2014
6	"Shizuoka Prefecture: The Case of Matsuri Sengen Part 3" "Shizuoka-ken: Sengen Matsuri no baai" (Episode 2 静岡県: 浅間まつりの場合)	May 13, 2014
7	"Tokyo Prefecture: The Case of Rin Kobari Part 1" "Tōkyō-fu: Kobari Rin no baai" (Episode 3 東京都: 小張凛の場合)	May 20, 2014
8	"Tokyo Prefecture: The Case of Rin Kobari Part 2" "Tōkyō-fu: Kobari Rin no baai" (Episode 3 東京都: 小張凛の場合)	May 27, 2014
9	"Tokyo Prefecture: The Case of Rin Kobari Part 3" "Tōkyō-fu: Kobari Rin no baai" (Episode 3 東京都: 小張凛の場合)	June 3, 2014
10	"Tokyo Prefecture: The Case of Rin Kobari Part 4" "Tōkyō-fu: Kobari Rin no baai" (Episode 3 東京都: 小張凛の場合)	June 10, 2014
11	"Ishikawa Prefecture: The Case of Yuri Inuwashi Part 1" "Ishikawa-ken: Inuwashi Yuri no baai" (Episode 4 石川県: 大鷲由里の場合)	June 17, 2014
12	"Ishikawa Prefecture: The Case of Yuri Inuwashi Part 2" "Ishikawa-ken: Inuwashi Yuri no baai" (Episode 4 石川県: 大鷲由里の場合)	June 24, 2014
13	"Ishikawa Prefecture: The Case of Yuri Inuwashi Part 3" "Ishikawa-ken: Inuwashi Yuri no baai" (Episode 4 石川県: 大鷲由里の場合)	July 1, 2014
14	"Ishikawa Prefecture: The Case of Yuri Inuwashi Part 4" "Ishikawa-ken: Inuwashi Yuri no baai" (Episode 4 石川県: 大鷲由里の場合)	July 8, 2014
15	"Mie Prefecture: The Case of Suzuka Kamiki Part 1" "Mie-ken: Kamiki Suzuka no baai" (Episode 5 三重県: 神木鈴花の場合)	July 15, 2014
16	"Mie Prefecture: The Case of Suzuka Kamiki Part 2" "Mie-ken: Kamiki Suzuka no baai" (Episode 5 三重県: 神木鈴花の場合)	July 22, 2014
17	"Mie Prefecture: The Case of Suzuka Kamiki Part 3" "Mie-ken: Kamiki Suzuka no baai" (Episode 5 三重県: 神木鈴花の場合)	July 29, 2014
18	"Kumamoto Prefecture: The Case of Renka Ariake Part 1" "Kumamoto-ken: Ariake Renka no baai" (Episode 6 熊本県: 有明煉華の場合)	August 5, 2014
19	"Kumamoto Prefecture: The Case of Renka Ariake Part 2" "Kumamoto-ken: Ariake Renka no baai" (Episode 6 熊本県: 有明煉華の場合)	August 12, 2014
20	"Kumamoto Prefecture: The Case of Renka Ariake Part 3" "Kumamoto-ken: Ariake Renka no baai" (Episode 6 熊本県: 有明煉華の場合)	August 19, 2014
21	"Kyoto Prefecture: The Case of Mebuki Konoe Part 1" "Kyōto-fu: Konoe Mebuki no baai" (Episode 7 京都府: 有明煉華の場合)	August 26, 2014
22	"Kyoto Prefecture: The Case of Mebuki Konoe Part 2" "Kyōto-fu: Konoe Mebuki no baai" (Episode 7 京都府: 近衛めぶきの場合)	September 2, 2014
23	"Kyoto Prefecture: The Case of Mebuki Konoe Part 3" "Kyōto-fu: Konoe Mebuki no baai" (Episode 7 京都府: 近衛めぶきの場合)	September 9, 2014
24	"Kyoto Prefecture: The Case of Mebuki Konoe Part 4" "Kyōto-fu: Konoe Mebuki no baai" (Episode 7 京都府: 近衛めぶきの場合)	September 16, 2014
A corrupted Rin is floating in a pool of water where she remembers the time before she was corrupted. It is revealed that Rin was the previous magical girl of the Tokyo ward before Kobarin, and in a fight against a monster, a building's debris broke off and hurt some civilians, which Rin witnessed and ran away in guilt; when Rin had retreated to a dark street alley, doubting herself as a magical girl, her now corrupted familiar Libby appeared and corrupted her power as a Magical Girl, resulting in the current corrupted Rin. In the present, Rin mentions to herself that she's been dirtied now. Soon, Mebuki confronts the corrupted Rin and attempts to stop her from draining the leylines of their power, which would end up killing the land.
25	"Kyoto Prefecture: The Case of Mebuki Konoe Part 5" "Kyōto-fu: Konoe Mebuki no baai" (Episode 7 京都府: 近衛めぶきの場合)	September 23, 2014
Above Kyoto, Mebuki fights the corrupted former Tokyo magical girl Rin and her corrupted familiar Libby as they attempt to drain the country's leylines of their power having allowed their corruptive power to take form of a dark phoenix that drains the nearby power sources. Down below, the citizens are helped by the reporter woman to safety from the fight's debris. The citizens' efforts to block the leyline from connecting to the phoenix is successful in distracting the corrupted Rin, at which Mebuki is able to then purify her from the dark powers, reverting Rin to her human form and destroying the corrupted Libby in the process. Mebuki now answers Rin's question at the start of the episode of how the Magical Girls can continue their role when despair and pain can be caused to innocents as consequence of their fights to keep the country safe from monsters; Mebuki tells Rin that while not every effort will go well, they can continue as Magical Girls because Magical Girls are the peoples' hopes.
26	"Shimane Prefecture: The Case of Amane Sakaki" "Shimaneken: Sakaki Amane no baai" (Episode 8 島根県: 榊天音の場合)	September 30, 2014
At daytime, a falling object resembling a shooting star moves across the sky which is spotted by several Magical Girls across Japan, including a now purified Rin who Kobarin spots, in the street carrying a flower bouquet presumably for her now deceased familiar. The scene then cuts to an unrelated girl named Yakumo Hina (anime original) spots the falling object and attempts but fails to make a wish on it, in the process missing her bus ride. The falling object lands in a forest near Shimane revealing the 'shooting star' to be Amane, alongside Yamada, both the amnesiac main characters of ZANBATSU. Amane then says she has come to slay the gods and walks up the nearby steps while Yamada follows along, roughly connecting and giving way to the ZANBATSU story-line. Yakumo Hina, Amane, and Yamada do the final 4th wallbreaker cutscene talking about their hopes of an animation featuring themselves in it and ending with the "Kashi Komi Kashi komi masu" transformation phrase.
