= Chain Chronicle =

Japanese media franchise

- Official cover for the First Season Artbook, depicting Yuri, Phoena and Pirika

チェインクロニクル (Chein Kuronikuru)
- Genre: Action, fantasy
- Video game
- Developer: Sega
- Publisher: Sega
- Music by: Takahiro Kai
- Genre: Role-playing game trading card game tower defense
- Platform: iOS; Android; PlayStation Vita
- Released: July 26, 2013 (iOS); August 1, 2013 (Android); July 16, 2014 (PlayStation Vita)
- Manga

Chain Chronicle Crimson
- Written by: Junpei Okazaki
- Published by: Kodansha
- Magazine: Bessatsu Shōnen Magazine
- Original run: July 2014 – August 2015
- Volumes: 3
- Original video animation

Chain Chronicle ~Short Animation~
- Directed by: Takeshi Mori
- Written by: Ken Shimomura
- Music by: Hideharu Mori; Manami Kiyota
- Studio: Jūmonji
- Released: September 6, 2014 (Theatrical Screening); December 18, 2014 (DVD)
- Runtime: 40 minutes (5 minutes per episode)
- Episodes: 8
- Anime television series

Chain Chronicle ~Light of Haecceitas~
- Directed by: Masashi Kudō
- Produced by: Kōtarō Urade; Ken Kawakita; Takayuki Funahashi; Hiroyuki Kikugawa; Makoto Nishibe; Kazuyoshi Nishikawa
- Written by: Touko Machida
- Music by: Masato Kōda
- Studio: Telecom Animation Film; Graphinica
- Licensed by: NA: Crunchyroll; SEA: Muse Communication
- Original network: ABC, Tokyo MX, AT-X, TVA, BS11, TVQ
- English network: SEA: Animax Asia
- Original run: January 8, 2017 – March 25, 2017; Theatrical Screening; December 3, 2016 (Part 1); January 14, 2017 (Part 2); February 11, 2017 (Part 3)
- Episodes: 12

Chain Chronicle (Note: Chain Chronicle (Japanese: チェインクロニクル, Hepburn: Chein Kuronikuru)) is a tower defense role-playing game developed and published by Sega for iOS, Android, and PlayStation Vita. It was released in Japan on July 26, 2013, for iOS, August 1, 2013, for Android and on July 16, 2014, for the PlayStation Vita. The game is licensed in Asia by SNDA released in China, MobiMon for both Taiwan and Macau, Actoz Soft for South Korea and Gumi Asia for both Southeast Asia and North America, however the game was closed down in North America and Southeast Asia on February 29, 2016.

The series spawned an original video animation series directed by Takeshi Mori, animated by Jūmonji. It was released on December 18, 2014. An anime film trilogy titled Chain Chronicle: The Light of Haecceitas premiered in Japanese Theaters between December 3, 2016, and February 11, 2017. An anime television series adaptation compiling the film trilogy was aired on January 8, 2017.

== Gameplay ==
Chain Chronicle combines three gameplay elements: tower defense, traditional role-playing and card trading in the form of Arcanas. The role-playing game elements drive the entire story, allowing the player to make decisions, visit towns and participate in events. The map system shows the towns and areas that the player must visit by tapping on one town to another, however for the player to get to the next town, it must clear some enemies first. Battle in the game is similar to a traditional tower defense game, each player can command a team of four Arcanas, with two more as sub-party extras and a guest unit. Each Arcana is assigned to 5 classes, and each unit are weak to specific class. In the second versions of the game, updates introduced Fighters and Gunners, with the former being a type of Swordsman, and the latter being an archer-type.

The goal of the game is to clear each stage without the enemy reaching the player's safe zone. Tapping one unit into the enemy allows it to attack and if the stage is cleared, the player can move to the next stage until it reaches the boss. If one of the enemies reaches the safe zone, the game is over. However, each unit has its own skill that can counter against enemies and easily clear each stage. If all stages are cleared, the player is awarded with money, special arcana and Arcana Coins. Players can also summon allies by using either Prysma or Arcana Coins, which are earned during gameplay. Each unit has its own story, which can be completed to obtain more Prysma or to unlock its special skill. Events are also in the game, allowing players to get special items and Arcanas.

== Story ==
The continent of Yggdra (ユグド, Yugudo) is a place where humans, ogres, giants, forest sprites, and many more mythical creatures live. Led by the Holy King, the continent was at peace until one day, a mysterious group called the Black Army (黒の軍勢, Kuro no Gunzei) appeared and started conquering the land. In response, the Holy King and its troops fought against it, but Holy Capital fell and the Holy King was killed by the mysterious Black King. As the continent was in the glimpse of destruction, hope glimmered as one man decided to fight back and formed the Volunteer Army to oppose the Black King and bring peace back to Yggdra.

== Characters ==
=== Volunteer Army ===
Yuri (ユーリ, Yūri)
Voiced by: Akira Ishida (Japanese); Ricco Fajardo (English)
Known also as Hero (主人公, Shujinkō), he is the main character of the story. A Warrior-Class Swordsman and Leader of the Volunteer Army, he is guided by the sprite Pirika in order to protect Phoena from the Black Army as well as discovering the mysteries behind the book she's carrying. He is illustrated by toi8.
Phoena (フィーナ, Fīna)
Voiced by: Ayane Sakura (Japanese); Dawn M. Bennett (English)
A Chronicler-Class Cleric and the main heroine of the story. Phoena is a mysterious girl who carries the Chronicle, a mysterious book that holds the world's history. She has retrograde amnesia; she cannot remember who she really is when she is first attacked by the Black Army until Yuri saved her. Over time, she begins to trust Yuri and the others as she tries to discover the mysteries behind the book. At the end of the first story, she is revealed to be the daughter of the Black King. She is illustrated by toi8.
Pirika (ピリカ, Pirika)
Voiced by: Maaya Uchida (Japanese); Tia Ballard (English)
A unique Elf Sprite who guides both Yuri and Phoena in their quests, she first saved Yuri once when he was chosen to form the Volunteer Army. She is illustrated by toi8.
Kain (カイン, Kain)
Voiced by: Maaya Uchida (Game), Mikako Komatsu (OVA), Toshiyuki Toyonaga (Anime) (Japanese); Clifford Chapin (English)
One of the first few members of the Volunteer Army, he is once a simple farmer before joining the Volunteer Army as a Knight to protect the kingdom. Though his skills are not as sharp, he greatly improves as his shield becomes the defining point of each battles. He is illustrated by RyuToru.
Michidia (ミシディア, Mishidia)
Voiced by: Maaya Uchida (Game), Rina Satou (OVA), Asami Imai (Anime) (Japanese); Caitlin Glass (English)
Also one of the first few members of the Volunteer Army, she is a former member of the Ranger's Guild before she left and joined Yuri. She doesn't show harsh emotions and is very nice, but sometimes she makes rational decisions. She is illustrated by moc.
Marina (マリナ, Marina)
Voiced by: Ayane Sakura (Game), Yuka Terasaki (OVA), Aya Uchida (Anime) (Japanese); Apphia Yu (English)
The last of the three guaranteed members of the Volunteer Army, she is a Cleric who's part of the Guild Alliance. Despite being serious and forthright, she had no sense of humor, and is also very clumsy. But also excels in healing skills. She is illustrated by Tetsu Kurosawa.
Aram (アラム, Aramu)
Voiced by: Daiki Yamashita (Japanese); Orion Pitts (English)
The main character of The Light of Haecceitas Anime, he is a thief who became involved in the battle between the Volunteer Army and the Black Army.

=== Black Army ===
Eirenus (エイレヌス, Eirenusu)
Voiced by: Manami Numakura (Japanese); Monica Rial (English)
Black King (黒王, Kuroō)
Voiced by: Akio Ōtsuka (Japanese); David Wald (English) he is 16 years old.

=== Holy Kingdom ===
Juliana (ユリアナ, Yuriana)
Voiced by: Kotori Koiwai (Japanese); Felecia Angelle (English)
Burckhardt (ブルクハルト, Burukuharuto)
Voiced by: Yoshihisa Kawahara (Japanese); J. Michael Tatum (English)
Einslot (アインスロット, Ainsurotto)
Voiced by: Yoshiaki Hasegawa (Japanese); Ian Sinclair (English)

=== Nine Territories ===
Shuza (シュザ, Shuza)
Voiced by: Hikaru Midorikawa (Japanese); Cris George (English)
Lord of the First Territory, the largest of all the nine territories. Not satisfied with only the Nine Territories of Fire, he aims to take over the entirety of Yggdra by will of nature.

== Media ==
=== Video game ===
The game was first released on iOS on July 26, 2013, following an Android release on August 1, 2013. A PlayStation Vita port titled "Chain Chronicle V" (Japanese: チェインクロニクルV, Hepburn: Chein Kuronikuru V) was released on July 16, 2014, on both Physical form and in the PlayStation Store.

The global version of the game was released on December 8, 2014. The second version of the game, Chain Chronicle: Brave New Continent, was released on October 6, 2015. Following with a Climax Chapter in December 2015. A Sequel chapter, only titled Chain Chronicle 3 (Japanese: チェインクロニクル3, Hepburn: Chein Kuronikuru 3) is released on November 24, 2016.

The global version of the game was shut down on February 29, 2016.

=== Manga ===
A manga adaptation titled "Chain Chronicle Crimson" (Japanese: チェインクロニクルクリムゾン, Hepburn: Chein Kuronikuru Kurimuzon) was written and illustrated by Junpei Okazaki, serialized in Kodansha's Bessatsu Shōnen Magazine from July 2014 to August 2015. 3 tankōbon volumes are released with the first volume containing a special code to obtain Caz in the game, who is voiced by Daisuke Namikawa.

=== Anime ===
An original video animation was produced by both Jūmonji and Sotsu and released on September 6, 2014, for theatrical screening and on December 18, 2014, on DVD. The opening song is titled "REASON" while the ending is titled "Arrive", both performed by The Sketchbook.

A film trilogy titled Chain Chronicle: The Light of Haecceitas (Japanese: チェインクロニクル ～ヘクセイタスの閃(ひかり)～, Hepburn: Chein Kuronikuru ~Hekuseitasu no Hikari) was released in Japan, with the first, second and third films premiering on December 3, 2016, January 14, 2017, and February 11, 2017, respectively. The anime television version begin airing in January 2017 after the release of the first anime film. The opening theme for the movie version is titled "Chain the World" by Nao Tōyama while the ending song is titled "PARAISO" by Nano. For the TV broadcast, the opening theme is titled "MY LIBERATION" by Nano while the ending theme is titled "True Destiny" by Nao Tōyama. Crunchyroll has licensed the series in North America.

==== Episode list ====
| No. | Title (Note: All English titles are taken from Crunchyroll and Funimation.) | Original release date |
|---|---|---|
| 1 | "Light and Darkness"; Transliteration: "Hikari to yami to" (Japanese: 光と闇と) | January 8, 2017 |
| 2 | "To Be With Others"; Transliteration: "Tomoni aru to Iukoto" (Japanese: 共にあるということ) | January 14, 2017 |
| 3 | "Symbol of Loyalty"; Transliteration: "Tadayoshi no shirushi" (Japanese: 忠義のしるし) | January 21, 2017 |
| 4 | "The Expanding Darkness"; Transliteration: "Hirogaru yami!" (Japanese: 広がる闇！) | January 28, 2017 |
| 5 | "Snowy Mountain Screams"; Transliteration: "Yukiyama no yobigoe" (Japanese: 雪山の呼び声) | February 4, 2017 |
| 6 | "The Nadir of Anguish"; Transliteration: "Kunō no hate" (Japanese: 苦悩の果て) | February 11, 2017 |
| 7 | "Torn Apart"; Transliteration: "Hanarebanare ni" (Japanese: 離ればなれに) | February 18, 2017 |
| 8 | "Unyielding Will"; Transliteration: "Akiramenai omoi" (Japanese: 諦めない想い) | February 25, 2017 |
| 9 | "The Flower in the Desert"; Transliteration: "Sabaku ni saku hana" (Japanese: 砂漠に咲く花) | March 4, 2017 |
| 10 | "The Sword That Rends Darkness"; Transliteration: "Yami o saku ha" (Japanese: 闇を裂く刃) | March 11, 2017 |
| 11 | "Live by the Sword, Die by the Sword"; Transliteration: "Ken ni iki, ken ni wasere" (Japanese: 剣に生き、剣に斃れ) | March 18, 2017 |
| 12 | "The Light of Haecceitas"; Transliteration: "Hekuseitasu no senkō" (Japanese: ヘクセイタスの閃) | March 25, 2017 |

== Reception ==
The game was met with positive reviews upon its first month of launch. Gamezebo praised its grid-based combat mechanics, number of characters, and extensive story, but criticized the serialized female character designs, saying "...the portrayal of women in Chain Chronicle is completely, and frustratingly, stuck in the past." Despite that, Gamezebo concluded "[e]ven though it has a few blemishes, they don't stop the gameplay from being fun and rewarding". 148Apps praised the game for its gameplay and fair free-to-play system, stated that "Chain Chronicle is an easy-to-learn role-playing game that successfully combines tower defense, strategy, and action".
