= Non Non Biyori =

Japanese manga series and its adaptations

- First tankōbon volume cover, featuring (from left to right) Renge Miyauchi, Komari and Natsumi Koshigaya, and Hotaru Ichijo

のんのんびより
- Genre: Slice of life; Comedy; Iyashikei
- Manga
- Written by: Atto
- Published by: Media Factory
- English publisher: NA: Seven Seas Entertainment
- Magazine: Monthly Comic Alive
- Original run: September 26, 2009 – February 26, 2021
- Volumes: 16
- Anime television series

Non Non Biyori (2013) Non Non Biyori Repeat (2015) Non Non Biyori Nonstop (2021)
- Directed by: Shinya Kawatsura
- Produced by: Yoshikazu Beniya; Oshi Yoshinuma; Masatoshi Ishizuka; Mika Shimizu; Youhei Kisara; Fumiyuki Gou; Rina Takahashi; Youichi Nakamura
- Written by: Reiko Yoshida
- Music by: Hiromi Mizutani
- Studio: Silver Link
- Licensed by: NA: Sentai Filmworks; SEA: Odex; UK: MVM Entertainment
- Original network: TV Tokyo, TV Osaka, TV Aichi, AT-X
- Original run: October 8, 2013 – March 29, 2021
- Episodes: 36 + 3 OVAs
- Anime film

Non Non Biyori Vacation
- Directed by: Shinya Kawatsura
- Produced by: Yoshikazu Beniya; Fumiyuki Gou; Shinpei Yamashita; Hayato Kaneko; Aya Iizuka; Mieko Tsuruta; Taiki Akasaka
- Written by: Reiko Yoshida
- Music by: Hiromi Mizutani
- Studio: Silver Link
- Licensed by: NA: Sentai Filmworks
- Released: August 25, 2018
- Runtime: 71 minutes
- Manga

Non Non Biyori: Remember
- Written by: Atto
- Published by: Media Factory
- Magazine: Monthly Comic Alive
- Original run: May 27, 2021 – January 27, 2022
- Volumes: 1
- icon

Non Non Biyori (のんのんびより) is a Japanese manga series written and illustrated by Atto. The series was serialized in Media Factory's Monthly Comic Alive magazine from September 2009 to February 2021 and is licensed in North America by Seven Seas Entertainment. The story is based on the same setting as Atto's former work, Toko-toko & Yume no Yume. A 12-episode anime television series adaptation produced by Silver Link aired in Japan between October and December 2013 and has been licensed by Sentai Filmworks. A second anime season aired between July and September 2015. An anime film premiered in August 2018, and a third anime season aired between January and March 2021.

== Plot ==
The story takes place in the small fictional countryside village of Asahigaoka, a place lacking many of the conveniences that people from the city are accustomed to. The nearest stores are a few miles away and one of the local schools consists of only five students, each of whom is in a different grade of elementary or middle school. Hotaru Ichijo, a fifth grader from Tokyo, transfers into Asahigaoka Branch School and adjusts to countryside life with her new friends.

== Characters ==
=== Main characters ===
Hotaru Ichijo (一条 蛍, Ichijō Hotaru)
Voiced by: Rie Murakawa
Hotaru is a fifth grade student who transfers into Asahigaoka Branch School from Tokyo due to her father's work transfer. She is quite tall for her age and has a crush on Komari to the point of frequently sewing various plush dolls of Komari to decorate her room with. She had come to Asahigaoka several times previously when she was younger because her relatives live nearby.
Renge Miyauchi (宮内 れんげ, Miyauchi Renge)
Voiced by: Kotori Koiwai
Renge is a first grade student. Her catchphrase is "Nyanpasū" (Meow-ning), a nonsensical phrase, and she plays the recorder. While she generally acts her age, she is often quite perceptive and eccentric. She adds a superfluous "n" at the end of sentences as a verbal tic. She is Hikage and Kazuho's younger sister.
Natsumi Koshigaya (越谷 夏海, Koshigaya Natsumi)
Voiced by: Ayane Sakura
Natsumi is a first-year middle school student. She is taller than Komari, her older sister. Rebellious and carefree, she often talks back to her mother, plays pranks on her older sister, and does poorly in school.
Komari Koshigaya (越谷 小鞠, Koshigaya Komari)
Voiced by: Kana Asumi
Komari is a second-year middle school student and Natsumi's older sister. She is quite short, a fact which she constantly bemoans as Natsumi often teases her for it. She has an innocent and easily scared personality, which Natsumi often takes advantage of.

=== Supporting characters ===
Suguru Koshigaya (越谷 卓, Koshigaya Suguru)
Suguru is a third-year middle school student and Natsumi and Komari's older brother. He doesn't speak and has very little presence besides occasional static visual comedy.
Kazuho Miyauchi (宮内 一穂, Miyauchi Kazuho)
Voiced by: Kaori Nazuka
Kazuho is Renge's older sister and the only teacher in the local school. She is also a 24-year-old graduate of Asahigaoka Branch School. She is fond of sleeping. Since all the students essentially study on their own in the classroom due to their different grades, she often spends class time napping.
Kaede Kagayama (加賀山 楓, Kagayama Kaede)
Voiced by: Rina Satō
Kaede is a 20-year-old graduate of Asahigaoka Branch School who runs the local candy store. As a result the other characters, and Renge in particular, call her "Dagashi-ya" (駄菓子屋; lit. 'Candy Store'). Her store also runs a ski rental business and mail order service.
Hikage Miyauchi (宮内 ひかげ, Miyauchi Hikage)
Voiced by: Misato Fukuen
Hikage is Renge's older sister who is a first-year high school student studying in Tokyo. She is also a graduate of Asahigaoka Branch School. She also appears in the author's other work Koakuma Meringue (こあくまメレンゲ; lit. 'Little Devil's Meringue'). When she returns to the village she tries to impress her siblings and friends with her trendy and "city-girl" ways only to be upstaged by Hotaru's genuine modern knowledge.
Yukiko Koshigaya (越谷 雪子, Koshigaya Yukiko)
Voiced by: Akiko Hiramatsu
Yukiko is Natsumi, Komari, and Suguru's mother. She is often strict, particularly towards Natsumi, who slacks off a lot. She is also a graduate of Asahigaoka Branch School. When she was a student, she took care of Kazuho as Kaede did with Renge when she was younger (according to the author in the afterword).
Konomi Fujimiya (富士宮 このみ, Fujimiya Konomi)
Voiced by: Ryōko Shintani
Konomi is a graduate of Asahigaoka Branch School who lives next door to the Koshigayas. She is a third-year student at a nearby high school.
Honoka Ishikawa (石川 ほのか, Ishikawa Honoka)
Voiced by: Ayahi Takagaki
Honoka is a first grade student who comes to visit her grandmother during summer vacation and becomes friends with Renge. She also appears in the author's other work Toko-toko (とことこ).
Aoi Nizato (新里 あおい, Niizato Aoi)
Voiced by: Shino Shimoji
Aoi is a first-year middle schooler who lives in Okinawa and works at her family's inn. A member of her school's badminton club, she quickly befriends Natsumi over their shared age and interest in the sport.
Shiori (しおり, Shiori)
Voiced by: Misaki Kuno
Shiori is the daughter of a police box officer, one year younger than Renge.
Akane Shinoda (篠田 あかね, Shinoda Akane)
Voiced by: Aimi Tanaka
Akane is a first-year high school student, a junior of Konomi, and in charge of flute in the brass band club.

== Media ==
=== Manga ===
The manga by Atto was serialized in Media Factory's Comic Alive magazine from the November 2009 issue sold on September, 26 2009, to the April 2021 issue sold on February 26, 2021, and ran for 120 chapters. It has been published in 16 tankōbon volumes from June 29, 2015, to March 23, 2021. Seven Seas Entertainment publishes the series in North America. In May 2021, a short spin-off manga titled Non Non Biyori: Remember began serialization.

No.	Original release date	Original ISBN	English release date	English ISBN
1	March 23, 2010	978-4-0406-6521-4	June 29, 2015	978-1-626921-48-1
2	December 22, 2010	978-4-0406-6522-1	September 15, 2015	978-1-626921-61-0
3	October 22, 2011	978-4-0406-6523-8	January 26, 2016	978-1-626921-82-5
4	July 23, 2012	978-4-0406-6524-5	May 23, 2016	978-1-626922-72-3
5	February 23, 2013	978-4-0406-6525-2	September 6, 2016	978-1-626923-29-4
6	September 21, 2013	978-4-0406-6526-9	January 17, 2017	978-1-626923-86-7
7	July 23, 2014	978-4-0406-6813-0	May 23, 2017	978-1-626924-86-4
8	March 23, 2015	978-4-0406-7282-3	September 12, 2017	978-1-626925-42-7
9	December 22, 2015	978-4-0406-7860-3	January 23, 2018	978-1-626926-77-6
10	September 23, 2016	978-4-0406-8542-7	July 31, 2018	978-1-626927-86-5
11	May 23, 2017	978-4-0406-9252-4	April 2, 2019	978-1-642750-26-3
12	February 23, 2018	978-4-0406-9686-7	September 3, 2019	978-1-642754-85-8
13	November 21, 2018	978-4-040651-80-4	August 25, 2020	978-1-645055-22-8
14	August 23, 2019	978-4-040640-16-7	January 5, 2021	978-1-64505-948-6
15	May 23, 2020	978-4-040646-34-3	October 12, 2021	978-1-64827-312-4
16	March 23, 2021	978-4-04-680308-5	July 5, 2022	978-1-63858-149-9
Remember	March 23, 2022	978-4-04-681161-5	—	—

=== Anime ===
A 12-episode anime television series adaptation, produced by Silver Link and directed by Shinya Kawatsura, aired in Japan between October 8 and December 24, 2013, and was simulcast by Crunchyroll. An original video animation (OVA) episode was bundled with the seventh manga volume released on July 23, 2014, and another OVA was bundled with the tenth manga volume on September 23, 2016. A third OVA was bundled with the compiled volume of the Non Non Biyori Remember manga on March 23, 2022, and serves as the 13th episode of the third season of the anime series. The opening theme is "Nanairo Biyori" (なないろびより, Rainbow-colored Weather) by Nano Ripe, and the ending theme, composed by Zaq, is "Non Non Biyori" (のんのん日和) sung by Rie Murakawa, Ayane Sakura, Kana Asumi and Kotori Koiwai. The series is licensed in North America by Sentai Filmworks, and in the United Kingdom by MVM Entertainment.

A second season, Non Non Biyori Repeat, aired in Japan between July 7 and September 22, 2015. The opening theme is "Kodama Kotodama" (こだまことだま, Echoing Words) by Nano Ripe and the ending theme is "Okaeri" (おかえり, Welcome Home) by Murakawa, Sakura, Asumi, and Koiwai.

An anime film, titled Non Non Biyori Vacation, premiered on August 25, 2018, with the staff and cast from the anime series returning to reprise their roles. The film's opening theme song is "Ao no Rakugaki" (あおのらくがき, Blue Graffiti) by Nano Ripe, and the ending theme song is "Omoide" (おもいで, Memories) composed by Zaq and performed by Murakawa, Sakura, Asumi, and Koiwai.

A third season, Non Non Biyori Nonstop, aired from January 11 to March 29, 2021. The staff and cast from the first two anime series are reprising their roles for the season. The opening theme is "Tsugihagi Moyō" (つぎはぎもよう, Patchwork Pattern) by Nano Ripe and the ending theme is "Tadaima" (ただいま, I'm Home) by Murakawa, Sakura, Asumi, and Koiwai. The third season ran for 12 episodes.

== Reception ==
By December 2015, the manga has sold over 1.3 million copies.
