= Kotori Koiwai =

Japanese voice actress, lyricist, and composer (born 1990)

- 小岩井 ことり
- Born: February 15, 1990 (age 36); Kyoto, Japan
- Occupations: Voice actress, lyricist, composer, singer
- Years active: 2009–present
- Agent: Peerless Gerbera
- Notable work: Non Non Biyori as Renge Miyauchi; Gatchaman Crowds as Utsutsu Miya; Teasing Master Takagi-san as Mano

Kotori Koiwai (小岩井 ことり, Koiwai Kotori; born February 15, 1990) is a Japanese voice actress, lyricist, composer, and singer from Kyoto.

== Biography ==
Koiwai was born in Kyoto on February 15, 1990. She initially took interest in voice acting after hearing the voice of Pikachu in the Pokémon anime. Afterwards, after working as a make-up model and as a narrator while still in high school, she became a voice actress.

Her debut as a voice actress was in 2011 in the anime Blue Exorcist.

Koiwai is also a songwriter and a lyricist. She writes songs and lyrics for voice actress Rie Tanaka. She also wrote the song and lyrics for a song for Idolmaster Million Live! that she also performs herself.

In 2019, she announced that she had been accepted into Mensa. She also provided guest vocals for "3+6+9" on the album Amateras of the Japanese band Blood Stain Child.

In 2020, she started doing ASMR streams and created her own ASMR Label: Kotoneiro.

== Filmography ==
=== Anime ===
2011

- Blue Exorcist (Yoshikuni)

2012

- Psycho-Pass (Yuki Funahara)
- Joshiraku (Kigurumi Harōkitei)

2013

- Day Break Illusion (Minori Murakami)
- Fantasista Doll (Medallia, Proto-Zero, Rembrandt, Sonnet, Suzuri, Ukiwa)
- Gatchaman Crowds (Utsutsu Miya)
- Gingitsune (Fuku)
- Non Non Biyori (Renge Miyauchi)
- Sunday Without God (Gigi Totogi, Jiji)
- The Severing Crime Edge (Iwai Mushanokōji)

2014

- Barakamon (Aiko Kōmoto)
- Captain Earth (Mia, Pitz)
- M3: Sono Kuroki Hagane (Sasame Izuriha, Tsugumi)
- Magica Wars (Mebuki Konoe)
- Mekakucity Actors (Hiyori Asahina)
- Saki: The Nationals (Maho Yumeno)
- Soul Eater Not! (Kana Altair)
- The Seven Deadly Sins (Elaine)

2015

- Aikatsu! (Nono Daichi)
- Charlotte (Konishi)
- Gatchaman Crowds: insight (Utsutsu Miya)
- Nisekoi: (Suzu Ayakaji)
- Non Non Biyori Repeat (Renge Miyauchi)
- The Rolling Girls (Tsuruha)

2016

- Mob Psycho 100 (Mari)
- Tanaka-kun Is Always Listless (Shiraishi)

2017

- Blue Exorcist: Kyoto Saga (Kinoshita, Young Konekomaru)
- KiraKira Pretty Cure A La Mode (Emiru Kodama)
- Chain Chronicle: Light of Haecceitas (Juliana)

2018

- Teasing Master Takagi-san (Mano)
- The Seven Deadly Sins: Revival of The Commandments (Elaine)
- Goblin Slayer (Mage)

2019

- Pastel Memories (Saori Rokugou)
- Teasing Master Takagi-san 2 (Mano)
- After School Dice Club (Ren Shibusawa)
- Val × Love (Kururi Saotome)

2020

- Smile Down the Runway (Kanami Oguri)

2021

- Cute Executive Officer (Designer)
- Non Non Biyori Nonstop (Renge Miyauchi)
- Godzilla Singular Point (Yukie Kanoko)
- I've Been Killing Slimes for 300 Years and Maxed Out My Level (Kuku)

2022

- Teasing Master Takagi-san 3 (Mano)
- Bocchi the Rock! (PA-san, JimiHen)

2023

- The Legend of Heroes: Trails of Cold Steel – Northern War (Millium Orion)
- D4DJ All Mix (Michiru Kaibara)
- Ōoku: The Inner Chambers (Sato, Sadakichi, Yotsuba)

2024

- Plus-Sized Elf (Kobo)
- Shy Season 2 (Ai Tennoji)

2025

- Medalist (Ema Yamato)
- Tougen Anki (Mei)

=== Other ===
2019

- Vocaloid (MEIKA Hime & Mikoto)

2021

- NEUTRINO (No.7)

=== Theatrical animation ===
- Friends: Mononoke Shima no Naki (2011) (Gotchi & Kutchi)
- Non Non Biyori Vacation (2018) (Renge Miyauchi)
- Teasing Master Takagi-san: The Movie (2022) (Mano)

=== Video games ===
2013

- The Idolmaster Million Live! (Tomoka Tenkubashi)
- The Legend of Heroes: Trails of Cold Steel (Millium Orion)
- Fantasista Doll (Suzuri, Proto-Zero, Sonnet)
- Mugen Souls Z (Tioni)

2014

- Hyperdevotion Noire: Goddess Black Heart (Lestra)
- Chain Chronicle (Various Arcana/Characters)
- Atelier Shallie: Alchemists of the Dusk Sea (Shallistera)
- The Legend of Heroes: Trails of Cold Steel II (Millium Orion)
- Granblue Fantasy (Daetta), (Goblin Mage)

2017

- The Legend of Heroes: Trails of Cold Steel III (Millium Orion)

2018

- Blustone 2 (Tyltyl)
- The Legend of Heroes: Trails of Cold Steel IV (Millium Orion, Sandy, Jingo)

2020

- Azur Lane (Suzutsuki)

2021

- D4DJ Groovy Mix (Michiru Kaibara)
- Gate of Nightmares (Mei Fang, Mousse)

2022

- Genshin Impact (Yun Jin)

2023

- Da Capo 5 (Menoa Yasaka)
- Crymachina (Vida)

2025

- Kemono Teatime (Tarte)
