= List of Samurai Harem: Asu no Yoichi chapters =

The chapters of Samurai Harem: Asu no Yoichi was written and illustrated by Yū Minamoto. It has been serialized in Monthly Shōnen Champion since it premiered in the October 2006 issue. The individual chapters are collected and published in tankōbon volumes by Akita Shoten, with the first volume published on October 6, 2006. Fifteen volumes were released in Japan. The manga is licensed and released in Chinese by Sharp Point Press. The manga is licensed in North America by Tokyopop as Samurai Harem: Asu no Yoichi!.

== Volume listing ==
No.	Original release date	Original ISBN	English release date	English ISBN
1	October 6, 2006	978-4-253-20963-2	June 9, 2009	978-1-4278-1616-0
01. "The Samurai Is Coming" (サムライ来る!, "Samurai Kuru!"); 02. "Welcome to Yokko High School" (ようこそ翼高, "Youkoso Tsubasa Daka"); 03. "Chihaya Pretending to be Chihaya" (ちはやぶるちはや, "Chihaya Buru Chihaya"); 04. "Like Me, Tsundere" (召しませツンデレ, "Meshi Mase Tsundere")
2	January 9, 2007	978-4-253-20964-9	October 13, 2009	978-1-4278-1617-7
05. "White Stocking, Black Tights" (白ニーソ黒タイツ, "Shiro Niiso Kuro Taitsu"); 06. "Strip and Burn!" (脱いだらすごいんです, "Nui Dara Sugoin Desu"); 07. "Performance in Bed is Very Important" (寝技がすごいんです, "Newaza ga Sugoin Desu"); 08. "Let's Go on a Date" (デートしようぜ!, "Deeto Shiyō Ze!")
3	May 8, 2007	978-4-253-20965-6	January 1, 2010	978-1-4278-1618-4
09. "Half-Exposed Bikini, One Piece" (スクミズ シロスク セバレート, "Sukumizu Shirosuku Sebareeto"); 10. "Love and Weird are Alike" (恋と変は似ている, "Koi to Hen Ha Ni Te Iru"); 11. "Perverts Usually Go with the Wind" (変態は風と友に去りぬ, "Hentai ha Kaze to Tomo ni Sari Nu"); 12. "Fly to the Fiery Summer Festival" (飛んで火に入る夏祭り, "Ton De Hi Ni Hairu Natsu Matsuri")
4	September 7, 2007	978-4-253-20966-3	April 1, 2010	978-1-4278-1619-1
13. "Chihaya Pretending to be Chihaya 2" (ちはやぶるちはや2, "Chihaya Buru Chihaya 2"); 14. "That Time, It Was Your Fault" (あの時君はワルかった, "Ano Toki Kimi wa Warukatta"); 15. "Do You Love Your Childish Sister?" (幼いお姉さんは好きですか？, "Osanai Onē-san wa Suki Desuka?"); 16. "Sakon Ojō-sama's Counterattack" (左近お嬢様の逆襲！, "Sakon Ojō-sama no Gyakushū!")
5	December 7, 2007	978-4-253-20967-0	July 13, 2010	978-1-4278-1620-7
17. "Fukurou-senpai" (ふくろう せんぱい, "Fukurō-senpai"); 18. "Karasuma White Maid Team" (烏丸ホワイトメイドチーム, "Karasuma Howaito Meido Chiimu"); 19. "Let's Have a Double Date" (ダブルデートをすることができます, "Daburu Deeto o Suru Koto Ga Deki Masu"); 19.5. "Ibuki's Project" (伊吹のプロジェクト, "Ibuki No Purojekuto")
6	April 8, 2008	978-4-253-20968-7	November 9, 2010	978-1-4278-1621-4
20. "Closed Room Bikini Armour" (クローズドルームビキニアーマー, "Kurōzudo Rūmu Bikini Āmā"); 21. "Dance! The Big Play!" (ダンス!ビッグプレー!, "Dansu! Biggu Puree!"); 22. "The Man with the Purple Shirt" (パープルのシャツの男, "Pāpuru no Shatsu no Otoko"); 23. "Black Knee-long Socks, White Tights" (ひざまでの長いソックス黒、白タイツ, "Hiza Made no Nagai Sokkusu Kuro, Shiro Taitsu")
7	August 8, 2008	978-4-253-20969-4	February 8, 2011	978-1-4278-1639-9
24. "You Are The One Who Should Surpass That School" (あなたの一人が学校を超える必要があります, "Anata no Ichi Nin ga Gakkō o Koeru Hitsuyō Ga Arimasu"); 25; 26; 27
8	December 8, 2008	978-4-253-20970-0	May 10, 2011	978-1-4278-1785-3
28; 29; 30. "Takatsukasa Angela's depression" (鷹司 アンジェラの憂鬱, "Takatsukasa anjera no Yūutsu")
9	March 6, 2009	978-4-253-20971-7	—	978-1-4278-1786-0
10	July 8, 2009	978-4-253-20972-4	—	—
11	November 6, 2009	978-4-253-20973-1	—	—
12	March 8, 2010	978-4-253-20974-8	—	—
13	June 8, 2010	978-4-253-20975-5	—	—
14	December 8, 2010	978-4-253-20976-2	—	—
15	March 8, 2011	978-4-253-20962-5	—	—
