= Rina Satō =

Japanese voice actress and singer (born 1981)

- 佐藤 利奈
- Born: May 2, 1981 (age 45); Kitakyushu, Fukuoka Prefecture, Japan
- Other names: Suzune Asakura (朝倉 鈴音, Asakura Suzune)
- Occupations: Voice actress; Singer
- Years active: 2001–present
- Agent: Tokyo Actor's Consumer's Cooperative Society
- Notable work: Umineko When They Cry as Ange Ushiromiya; Negima! Magister Negi Magi as Negi Springfield; A Certain Magical Index as Mikoto Misaka; Bleach: Thousand-Year Blood War as Senjumaru Shutara; Persona 5 as Makoto Niijima; Amagami SS as Kaoru Tanamachi; Tales of Berseria as Velvet Crowe; Sailor Moon Crystal as Rei Hino/Sailor Mars; Blue Exorcist as Shura Kirigakure; Brave Witches as Gundula Rall; Natsume's Book of Friends as Touru Taki; Miss Caretaker of Sunohara-sou as Ayaka Sunohara; Bofuri as Mii; Corpse Party as Naomi Nakashima; Hyperdimension Neptunia as Vert/Green Heart; JoJo's Bizarre Adventure: Diamond Is Unbreakable as Hayato Kawajiri; Brothers Conflict as Ema Hinata; Genshin Impact as Eula Lawrence
- Height: 157 cm (5 ft 2 in)
- Spouse: Undisclosed (m. 2017)
- Children: 1
- Awards: Best Lead Actress in 8th Seiyu Awards

Rina Satō (佐藤 利奈, Satō Rina) (born May 2, 1981) is a Japanese voice actress with hundreds of television and video game productions, many multi-year, as well as films. She is also a singer She won the Best Lead Actress Award at the 8th Seiyu Awards. Satō has been active in the entertainment industry since 2003.

== Biography ==
Satō was born in Kitakyushu City, Fukuoka Prefecture. She later relocated to Yamaguchi Prefecture and Hiroshima Prefecture, then Ehime Prefecture. She received training at the Haikyō Voice Actors Studio, finishing in 2001 in the "19th gen" class, and joined the Haikyō cooperative in 2002.

== Filmography ==
=== Anime ===
List of vocal performances in anime
Year	Title	Role	Notes	Source
2003	Divergence Eve	Prim Snowlight		
2003	Popotan	Student		
2004	Misaki Chronicles	Prim Snowlight		
2004	Mermaid Melody Pichi Pichi Pitch Pure	Girl		
2004	Uta Kata	Nurse		
2005–09	Negima! Magister Negi Magi series	Negi Springfield		
2005	Majime ni Fumajime: Kaiketsu Zorori	Umaki ウマキ		
2005–06	Twin Princess of Wonder Planet (Fushigiboshi no Futagohime)	Mia, Sophie		
2005	Glass Mask	Young Maria		
2005	Best Student Council	Yukimi Itami		
2005	Futakoi Alternative	Gankuro		
2005	Loveless	Schoolgirl		
2005	Honey and Clover	Schoolgirl		
2005	Da Capo: Second Season	Munepi		
2005–12	To Heart 2 series	Yūki Kusakabe		
2005	Hell Girl	Yuka Kasuga		
2005	Mushishi	IO		
2005–06	School Rumble	Kōsuke Ichijō		
2006	Tactical Roar	Flood		
2006	Kashimashi: Girl Meets Girl	Natsuko Kameyama		
2006	Binchō-tan	Ren-tan		
2006	REC	Boy		
2006	Twin Princess of Wonder Planet Gyu! (Fushigiboshi no Futagohime Gyu!)	KyuKyu, Sophie		
2006	Magical Witch Punie-Chan	Punie Tanaka	OVA	
2006	Zegapain	Mizusawa		
2006	Saru Get You -On Air-	Charu		
2006	Honey and Clover	Female student	2nd season	
2006	Coyote Ragtime Show	February		
2006	Tona-Gura!	Yuji (child), Arisa Shidō		
2006	Mobile Suit Gundam SEED C.E. 73: Stargazer	Mudie Holcroft	OVA	
2006	Baldr Force EXE Resolution	Tsukina Sasagiri	OVA	
2006	Negima!?	Negi Springfield		
2006	Intrigue in the Bakumatsu - Irohanihoheto	Yuyama Kakunojō		
2007	Shattered Angels	Kozue Satō		
2007	Major	Tateishi	TV series 3	
2007	Gurren Lagann	Kiyoh Bachika		
2007–13	Hayate the Combat Butler	Shiori Makimura, Jenny, Kotaro Azumamiya, Eight, Mecha Butler Thirteen, Orumuzuto Nadja, Butler Mini Yon, others		
2007	Heroic Age	Prome O		
2007–09	Shinkyoku Sokai Polyphonica	Prinesca Yugiri	Also Crimson S in 2009	
2007	Kishin Taisen Gigantic Formula	Mana Kamishiro		
2007	Big Windup!	Suzune Miyashita		
2007	Bamboo Blade	Satori Azuma		
2007	Night Wizard The Animation	Kureha Akabane		
2007–13	Minami-ke	Haruka Minami		
2008	H2O Footprints in the Sand	Teacher		
2008	Yatterman	Byun Kuroimo		
2008	Blue Dragon: Trials of the Seven Shadows	Primula		
2008	Zettai Karen Children	Hotaru Nowaki, Masaru Tōno		
2008	Net Ghost PiPoPa	Yūta Akikawa		
2008	Hakken Taiken Daisuki! Shimajirō	Narrator		
2008	Junjo Romantica	Akihiko Usami (boy)		
2008	Nijū Mensō no Musume	Shunka Koito		
2008	Kyōran Kazoku Nikki	Gekka Midarezaki		
2008	Telepathy Shōjo Ran	Saeko Ito		
2008–12	Nogizaka Haruka no Himitsu	Shiina Amamiya		
2008	Blade of the Immortal	Rin Asano		
2008–present	A Certain Magical Index	Mikoto Misaka		
2008	Magician's Academy	Futaba Kirishima		
2008–10	Nodame Cantabile	Lucas	Paris, Finale	
2009–present	Natsume's Book of Friends	Touru Taki		
2009	Viper's Creed	Kelly		
2009	Asu no Yoichi	Ibuki Ikaruga		
2009	Kurokami: The Animation	Risa Yamada, YoshiYuki		
2009	Beyblade: Metal Fusion	Dan and Reiki Soudou		
2009	Umineko no Naku Koro ni	Ange Ushiromiya		
2009	Nyan Koi!	Chizuru Mochizuki, Cindy		
2009–Present	A Certain Scientific Railgun	Mikoto Misaka		
2009	Tatakau Shisho	Yuri Hamuro ユーリ=ハムロー		
2009	Miracle Train: ōedo-sen e Yōkoso	Michi's Mother		
2009	Whispered Words	Shomei 照明		
2010–11	The Qwaser of Stigmata	Yumie Hiragi		
2010	Quiz Magic Academy ja:クイズマジックアカデミー	Yu, Satsuki	OVA 2	
2010	Mudazumo Naki Kaikaku	Yulia Tymoshenko	OVA	
2010	Shimajiro Hesoka	Narrator		
2010	Mayoi Neko Overrun!	Kazumi Satou		
2010–12	Amagami SS	Kaoru Tanamachi		
2010	MM!	Tatsukichi Hayama		
2011	I Don't Like You at All, Big Brother!!	Rin Yatagai		
2011	Air Gear: Break on the Sky	Rika Noyamano	OVA	
2011	Bleach	Mayu	Ep. 313	
2011–13	You're Being Summoned, Azazel	Rinko Sakuma		
2011	Sket Dance	Biba-chan		
2011	Astarotte no Omocha!	Naoya Tōhara		
2011	Blue Exorcist	Shura Kirigakure	Also Kyoto Saga in 2017, Shimane Illuminati Saga and Beyond the Snow Saga in 2024, The Blue Night Saga in 2025	
2011–13	Ro-Kyu-Bu!	Touko Hatano		
2011	Croisée in a Foreign Labyrinth	Claude (childhood)		
2011	Blood-C	Hair Elder Bairn	episode 10	
2011	The Mystic Archives of Dantalian	Ratisha Serkis ラティーシャ・サーキス		
2011	Baby Princess 3D Paradise 0	Miharu Amatsuka	OVA	
2011–13	Phi Brain: Puzzle of God	Tamaki Chieno		
2011	Maken-ki!	Martha Minerva		
2012	Bodacious Space Pirates	Jenny Dolittle		
2012	Brave 10	Isanami		
2012	Listen to Me, Girls. I Am Your Father!	Sawako Midorikawa		
2012	Shirokuma Cafe	Hiromi		
2012	Sengoku Collection	Ashikaga Yoshiteru		
2012	Aesthetica of a Rogue Hero	Listy El Da Sherfied		
2012	The Ambition of Oda Nobuna	Louise Frois		
2012–13	Maji de Otaku na English! Ribbon-chan: Eigo de Tatakau Mahō Shōjo ja:マジでオタクなイングリッシュ！りぼんちゃん ～英語で戦う魔法少女～	Garnet		
2012	B-Daman Fireblast (Cross Fight B-Daman eS)	Chaos		
2013	Hetalia: The Beautiful World	Protagonist's wife		
2013	Space Battleship Yamato 2199	Makoto Harada		
2013	Brothers Conflict	Ema Asahina		
2013	Sunday Without God	Hana/Alfa	replaces Yuko Goto	
2013	Genshiken: Second Generation	Saki Kasukabe		
2013	Corpse Party: Tortured Souls	Naomi Nakashima	OVA	
2013	Hyperdimension Neptunia: The Animation	Vert (Green Heart)		
2013	Wanna Be the Strongest in the World	Kanae Fujishita		
2013	Assassination Classroom	Yukiko Kanzaki	event anime only	
2013–15, 2021	Non Non Biyori	Kaede Kagayama		
2013	BlazBlue Alter Memory	Ragna the Bloodedge (child)		
2014	Buddy Complex	Elvira Hill		
2014	Saki: The Nationals	Sae Usuzawa		
2014	No-Rin	Tsukasa Nakazawa		
2014	Cardfight!! Vanguard: Legion Mate	Rati Curti		
2014	The Kawai Complex Guide to Manors and Hostel Behavior	Mayumi Nishikino		
2014	Blade & Soul	Maina		
2014	Brynhildr in the Darkness	Miki, Ryota Murakami (child)		
2014–15	Knights of Sidonia	Numi Tahiro		
2014	M3: The Dark Metal	Young Iwato, Mimei Maki		
2014	Free! Eternal Summer	Kisumi Shigino (child)		
2014	Pretty Guardian Sailor Moon Crystal Season I	Rei Hino/Sailor Mars	ONA, Dark Kingdom arc	
2014	Laughing Under the Clouds	Botan		
2014	Magic Kaito 1412	Philip Maximillion de Ingram		
2014	Celestial Method	Koharu's mother		
2014	Gugure! Kokkuri-san	Kureha		
2014	A Good Librarian Like a Good Shepherd	Miyu Serizawa		
2014	Girl Friend Beta	Akane Sakurai		
2015	Minna Atsumare! Falcom Gakuen SC	Rixia Mao リーシャ		
2015	Pretty Guardian Sailor Moon Crystal Season II	Rei Hino/Sailor Mars	ONA, Black Moon arc	
2015	Gourmet Girl Graffiti	Ryō Machiko		
2015	The Idolmaster Cinderella Girls	Chihiro Senkawa		
2015	Re-Kan!	Grandmother		
2015	Aki no Kanade ja:アキの奏で	Aki Miyagawa		
2015	Rokka: Braves of the Six Flowers	Mora Chester		
2015	Sky Wizards Academy	Socie Whitale		
2015	Heavy Object	Lendy Farolito		
2016	Haruchika: Haruta & Chika	Chinatsu's mother		
2016	Girls Beyond the Wasteland	Taiko Ōiso		
2016	Gate	Nora	season 2	
2016	Hundred	Souffle Clearrall		
2016	Pretty Guardian Sailor Moon Crystal Season III	Rei Hino/Sailor Mars	TV Anime, Death Busters arc	
2016	Kuromukuro	Paula Kowalczyk		
2016	Kiznaiver	Honoka Maki		
2016	Brave Witches	Gundula Rall		
2016	Planetarian: The Reverie of a Little Planet	Satomi Kurahashi	web series	
2016	Tsukiuta. The Animation	Yuno Terase		
2016	JoJo's Bizarre Adventure: Diamond Is Unbreakable	Hayato Kawajiri		
2016–17	Tales of Zestiria the X	Velvet Crowe		
2017	The Idolmaster Cinderella Girls	Chihiro Senkawa		
2017	WorldEnd	Lillia Asplay		
2017–present	Classroom of the Elite	Sae Chabashira		
2017	UQ Holder!	Negi Springfield		
2017	Clean Freak! Aoyama kun	Yuri Tamura		
2017	Aho-Girl	Atsuko Oshieda		
2018–19	Persona 5: The Animation	Makoto Niijima	also "Dark Sun..." in December 2018, and "Stars and Ours" in March 2019	
2018	The Seven Deadly Sins: Revival of the Commandments	Matrona		
2018	Miss Caretaker of Sunohara-sou	Ayaka Sunohara		
2018	Captain Tsubasa (2018)	Natsuko Ōzora		
2018	Sword Gai	Kyōka Kagami	Original net animation	
2018–19	Ace Attorney	Dahlia Hawthorne, Sister Iris		
2018	Aikatsu Friends!	Chiharu Hachiya		
2018	Lord of Vermilion: The Crimson King	Akira Harabuki		
2018	Island	Kuon Ohara		
2018	Saint Seiya: Saintia Shō	Pavo Mayura	Original net animation	
2019	The Price of Smiles	Reira Etoile		
2019	How Clumsy you are, Miss Ueno	Nishihara		
2019	Demon Lord, Retry!	Yū Kirino		
2019	How Heavy Are the Dumbbells You Lift?	Nana Uehara		
2020–23	Bofuri	Mii		
2020	Listeners	Swell Rec		
2020	Wandering Witch: The Journey of Elaina	Eihemia		
2021	Life Lessons with Uramichi Oniisan	Ikuko Heame		
2021	Ranking of Kings	Hiling		
2022	Arifureta: From Commonplace to World's Strongest 2nd Season	Noint		
2022	Super Dragon Ball Heroes	Vidro / Female Warrior in Black	Original net animation	
2022	Birdie Wing: Golf Girls' Story	Haruka Misono		
2022	Akiba Maid War	Ranko Mannen		
2022–2024	Bleach: Thousand-Year Blood War	Senjumaru Shutara		
2023	The Reincarnation of the Strongest Exorcist in Another World	Rize		
2023	Onmyōji	Ashiya Dōman	ONA	
2024	My Instant Death Ability Is So Overpowered	Lain		
2024	Mission: Yozakura Family	Hakuja		
2025	You and Idol PreCure	Darkine		
2025	Yaiba: Samurai Legend	Shizuka Mine		
2025	Call of the Night	Kiku Hoshimi		
2025	Dusk Beyond the End of the World	Casuta		
2026	The Darwin Incident	Hannah Stein		

=== Film ===
List of vocal performances in film
Year	Title	Role	Notes	Source
2008	Gurren Lagann the Movie –Childhood's End-	Kiyoh		
2008	One ball of the theater version MAJOR major friendship	Sudo Naomasa		
2009	Hells Angels	Giriera		
2009	Gurren Lagann the Movie – The Lights in the Sky Are Stars	Kiyoh		
2010	Time of Eve	Nagi		
2011	Negima! Anime Final	Negi Springfield		
2012	Blue Exorcist: The Movie	Shura Kirigakure		
2013	Toaru Majutsu no Index: Endymion's Miracle	Mikoto Misaka		
2014	Bodacious Space Pirates The Movie: Abyss of Hyperspace	Jenny Dolittle		
2014	Chain Chronicle	Mishidia / Yugudo	theatrical anime shorts, limited run	
2018	Maquia: When the Promised Flower Blooms	Mido		
2018	Non Non Biyori Vacation	Kaede Kagayama		
2018	Natsume's Book of Friends Movie	Touru Taki		
2019	Mr. Osomatsu: the Movie	Nozomi Takahashi		
2020	Altered Carbon: Resleeved	Gena		
2020	Demon Slayer: Kimetsu no Yaiba the Movie: Mugen Train	Amane Ubuyashiki		
2021	Pretty Guardian Sailor Moon Eternal The Movie	Rei Hino/Super Sailor Mars	2-part film, Season 4 of Sailor Moon Crystal (Dead Moon arc)	
2021	Aria the Crepusculo	Athena Glory		
2023	Pretty Guardian Sailor Moon Cosmos The Movie	Rei Hino/Eternal Sailor Mars	2-part film, Season 5 of Sailor Moon Crystal (Shadow Galactica arc)	

=== Video games ===
List of vocal performances in video games
Year	Title	Role	System	Notes	Ref
2003	Snow Sakura	Misaki Soya	PC	Adult, as Suzune Asakura	
2004–15	To Heart 2 games	Yūki Kusakabe			
2005	Best Student Council	Yukimi Itami	PS2		
2005–16	Quiz Magic Academy series	Yu, Satsuki	Arcade, starting with 3		
2006	Suikoden V	Luserina	PS2		
2006	Negima	Negi Springfield	PS2		
2006	True Tears	Katsura Yukishiro	PC, Also PS2 remake in 2008		
2006	Xenosaga Episode III	May Magus	PS2		
2006	Asobi ni Iku yo! ～Chikyû Pinchi no Konyaku Sengen～	Faye	PS2, Game original character		
2006	Rec: Doki Doki Seiyū Paradise	Maki Koiwai	PS2		
2007	RoutesPE	Yuna Kajiwara	PS2		
2007	Princess Maker 5	Daughter	PC		
2007	Bincho-tan Shiawase-goyomi	Ren-tan	PS2		
2007	Magician's Academy	Futaba Kirishima	PS2		
2007	Mana Khemia: Alchemists of Al-Revis	Melanie Ruthers	PS2		
2008	Night Wizard: Denial of the World	Kureha Akabane	PS2		
2008	Star Ocean: Second Evolution	Philia	PSP		
2008	Aoi Shiro	Nami, Yasuhime like	PS2		
2008	Mana Khemia 2: Fall of Alchemy	Liliane Vehlendorf	PS2		
2008	Zettai Karen Children DS: Dai-4 no Children	Hotaru Nowaki	DS		
2008–10	Nogizaka Haruka no Himitsu games	Shiina Amamiya	PS2		
2008	Way of the Samurai 3	Osei/Shizuru Sakurai	PS3		
2008	Otomedius G	Aoba Anoa			
2008	Rune Factory Frontier	Black Iris	Wii		
2008	Tales of Hearts	Dona Meteoryte	DS		
2009	Dengeki Gakuen RPG: Cross of Venus	Mikoto Misaka	DS		
2009–14	Amagami	Kaoru Tanamachi	PS2	Also Ebikore+	
2009	Hayate the Combat Butler!! Nightmare Paradise	Eight	PSP		
2009	Bamboo Blade: Sorekara no Chousen	Satori Azuma	PSP		
2009	Arc Rise Fantasia	Crown? リューズ	Wii		
2009–15	Atelier Rorona: The Alchemist of Arland	Esty Dee	also Plus and remakes		
2009	Wizardry: Labyrinth of Lost Souls	Nyarutorisu-Arumentarisu ニャルトリス・アルメンタリス	PS3		
2010	Zangeki no Reginleiv	Ran	Wii		
2010	White Album	Sayoko Kisaragi	PS3	Character introduced in PS3 version	
2010–15	Corpse Party games	Naomi Nakashima	PSP		
2010–	Hyperdimension Neptunia games	Vert (Green Heart)			
2010	Koumajou Densetsu II: Stranger's Requiem	Reimu Hakurei	PC	Also in the remaster version of Koumajou Densetsu: Scarlet Symphony	
2010	The Legend of Heroes: Trails from Zero	Rixia Mao	PSP	also Evolution in 2014	
2010–11	Umineko When They Cry games	Ange Ushiromiya	PS3		
2011–13	A Certain Magical Index games	Mikoto Misaka	PSP		
2011	Tsukumonogatari	Tono Sakumi	PSP		
2011	Otomedius Excellent	Aoba Anoa			
2011–13	Atelier Meruru: The Apprentice of Arland	Esty Dee	PS3	also Plus	
2011	Queen's Gate Spiral Chaos	Lili	PSP		
2011	Tales of Xillia	Presa	PS3		
2011	Ro-Kyu-Bu!	Touko Hatano	PSP		
2011	A Certain Scientific Railgun	Mikoto Misaka	PSP		
2012	Maji de Watashi ni Koi Shinasai! S	Yoshitsune Minamoto	PC	Adult; As Usa Nato (奈取うさ)	
2012–13	Root Double: Before Crime * After Days	Kazami Tachibana		Also Xtend	
2012–15	Girl Friend Beta	Akane Sakurai		Also Summer	
2012	Tales of Xillia 2	Presa	PS3		
2012–15	A Good Librarian Like a Good Shepherd	Miyu Serizawa	PC	Adult, as Suzune Asakura	
2013	PlayStation All-Stars Battle Royale	Char	Japanese dub		
2013	Tales of Hearts R	Sango Corallo			
2013	Mind Zero	Shana Chikage			
2013	Tears to Tiara II: Heir of the Overlord	Elissa	PS3		
2014	Super Heroine Chronicle	Noel Kazamatsuri			
2014	Granblue Fantasy	Esser/Tien, Negi Springfield	iOS/Android		
2014	Hamatora: Look at Smoking World	D	3DS		
2014	The Legend of Heroes: Trails of Cold Steel II	Rixia Mao			
2014	Dungeon Travelers 2	Yuki Kusakabe			
2014	Lord of Magna: Maiden Heaven	Luchs Eduard	3DS		
2014	Dengeki Bunko: Fighting Climax	Mikoto Misaka		Also Ignition in 2015	
2014	Silent Scope: Bone-Eater	Leila Hagitsuki			
2015	Higurashi When They Cry Sui	Chisato Saeki		replaces Eri Kitamura	
2015	Xenoblade Chronicles X	Cross (Fickle)	Wii U		
2015	Princess Connect!	Ruka Tachiarai	iOS/Android		
2015	Dragon Quest VIII	Yurima	3DS version		
2015	Saki: The Nationals	Sae Usuzawa			
2015	7th Dragon III Code: VFD	Character voice	3DS		
2016	Girls' Frontline	AK-47 Angelia		Mobile Games	
2016	Cardfight!! Vanguard: Ride to Victory!!	Yukino Mizuki	3DS		
2016	Gundam Breaker 3	MC Hal			
2016	Tales of Berseria	Velvet Crowe	PS4, PS3, Windows	also PS5, Xbox Series X/S and Nintendo Switch in 2026	
2016	Persona 5	Makoto Niijima	PS4, PS3	also Royal in 2019	
2017	Another Eden	Amy	iOS/Android		
2017	Azur Lane	USS California, USS Tennessee	iOS/Android		
2018	Princess Connect! Re:Dive	Ruka Tachiarai	iOS/Android		
2019	Super Smash Bros. Ultimate	Makoto Niijima	Nintendo Switch, DLC		
2019	Fate/Grand Order	Lakshmibai	iOS/Android		
2019	Arknights	Skadi/Skadi The Corrupting Heart, Vulcan	iOS, Android		
2019	A Certain Magical Index: Imaginary Fest	Mikoto Misaka	Android, iOS		
2019	Dusk Diver 酉閃町	Yang Yumo	PC, PS4, Nintendo Switch		
2020	Persona 5 Strikers	Makoto Niijima	PS4, Nintendo Switch		
2020	Bleach: Brave Souls	Senjumaru Shutara	iOS/Android		
2020	MapleStory	Adele (Female)	PC		
2020	Genshin Impact	Eula	iOS/Android/PC/PS4/Switch		
2020	The Legend of Heroes: Trails into Reverie	Rixia Mao	PS4		
2021	The Legend of Heroes: Trails Through Daybreak	Yin	PS4		
2021	Counter:Side	Nanahara Chifuyu	iOS/Android/PC		
2022	Jujutsu Kaisen: Phantom Parade	Saki Rindō	iOS/Android		
2022	Koumajou Remilia: Scarlet Symphony	Reimu Hakurei	PC/Switch		
2023	Sword Art Online: Last Recollection	Dorothy			
2023	Goddess of Victory: Nikke	Guilty	iOS/Android		
2023	Xenoblade Chronicles 3: Future Redeemed	A	Switch		
2023	Blue Archive	Konoe Mina, Mikoto Misaka	iOS/Android		
2023	Persona 5 Tactica	Makoto Niijima			
2024	Umamusume: Pretty Derby	Ryōka Tsurugi	iOS/Android		
2024	Zenless Zone Zero	Caesar King	iOS/Android		
2024	Reverse Collapse: Code Name Bakery	Helena Martin	PC		

=== Drama CD ===
List of vocal performances in drama CD
Year	Title	Role	Notes	Source
2005	Chitose Get You!!	Hinako Hiiragi		
2006	Venus Versus Virus	Sumire Takahana		
2007	Negima!	Negi Springfield, Tsukune	2 Drama CDs	
2008–09	Minami-ke	Haruka Minami	3 releases	
2008	Nogizaka Haruka no Himitsu	Amamiya Shiina	2 CDs	
2010	A Certain Scientific Railgun	Mikoto Misaka	Archives 1, 2, and 3	
2010	2010 Corpse Party: Mafuyu no Kaidankai	Naomi Nakashima	2 Drama CDs	
2011	A Certain Magical Index	Mikoto Misaka	Index II Archives 3 and 4	
	Heaven's Memo Pad	Chiemi Aigasawa		
	Ro-Kyu-Bu!	Fuyuko Hatano		
	Arpeggio of Blue Steel	Takao		
	Ultra Kaijoshi	Eleking		
	Persona 5: The Night Breakers	Makoto Niijima		

=== Dubbing ===
List of dubbing performances
Year	Title	Role	Notes	Source
2009	Chuggington	Brewster		
2010	Kyle XY	Amanda Bloom		
2010	The Spy Next Door	Farren		
2013	Evil Dead	Olivia		
2014	Prince of Lan Ling	Zheng Er / Feng Xiaolian		
2014	Zapped	Rachel Todds		
2014	Tarzan	Jane		
2014	Dragon Lord	Alice		
2016	Brotherhood of Blades	Zhou Miao Tong		
2017	Mars	MAE		
2017	Baahubali: The Beginning	Avantika		
2017	The Third Way of Love	Zou Yue		

== Discography ==
=== Singles ===
List of singles
Release dates	Titles	Notes	Source
December 22, 2005	"Masshiro na Kimochi" (まっ白な気持ち)		
July 28, 2006	"Himawari Days" (ひまわりデイズ☆)		
October 24, 2007	"Keikenchi Joushouchuu"		
November 21, 2007	"Colorful Days"		
January 23, 2008	"Kokoro no Tsubasa"		
February 6, 2008	"Sono Koe ga Kikitakute"		
July 2, 2008	"Appare Henka ja" (あっぱれ変化じゃ。); Gekka Midarezaki (Rina Satou); Kyōran Kazoku Nikki ending theme	#129 on Oricon	
July 23, 2008	"Hitosashiyubi Quiet"		
September 26, 2008	"Amamiya Shiina"	Nogizaka Haruka no Himitsu character CD 3 #86 on Oricon	
December 17, 2008	"Haru Natsu Aki Toujou!"		
January 21, 2009	"Keikenchi Soku Jōjō" (経験値速上々↑↑)		
January 21, 2009	"Zettai Colorful Sengen" (絶対カラフル宣言)		
February 25, 2009	"Kyōmoashitamo goisshoni!" (今日も明日もご一緒に); Ibuki Ikaruga (Rina Satou)	Asu no Yoichi! Character Song Vol.1 Ikaruga Ibuki #193 on Oricon	
October 23, 2009	"Himitsu Suishou! Uruto Love"		
August 18, 2010	"Kitto Ashita Wa" (きっと明日は・・・(特別盤))	#39 on Oricon	
January 23, 2013	"Shiawase High Tension"		
January 23, 2013	"Kyuusekkin Lucky Days"		
January 30, 2013	"HP ∞ LOVE Power"	Hyperdimension Neptunia Vol. 3 – Vert × Green Heart #59 on Oricon	
November 20, 2013	"Only My Way"; Arthur Technosmith (Rina Satou)	Kaku-San-Sei Million Arthur Character Song 1 #123 on Oricon	
August 19, 2016	"My Longing"; Terase Yuno (Rina Satou)	Tsukiuta series #157 on Oricon	

=== Albums ===
List of albums
Release dates	Titles	Notes	Source
March 25, 2005	Sorairo no Ribbon (空色のリボン)		
April 21, 2006	Sugar Sky		
April 13, 2007	Twin Moon		
February 27, 2009	N's		
July 23, 2009	Minamike Character Song Best Album		
November 26, 2009	Nogizaka Haruka no Himitsu Purezza A LA CARTE 1		
December 23, 2009	Nogizaka Haruka no Himitsu Purezza A LA CARTE 2		
January 27, 2010	Happy?		
February 26, 2010	Nogizaka Haruka no Himitsu Purezza A LA CARTE 3		

== Personal life ==
On New Year's Day 2017, Satō announced that she had been married since December 31, and that she has given birth to son.

On January 27, 2022, Satō tested positive for COVID-19.

As of 2022, Satō had qualifications in calligraphy (brush, hard brush first stage), and in Kyudo (third grade), and was licensed to drive a scooter.
