= Binchō-tan (manga) =

Japanese manga character

- Binchotan
- Cover of Binchotan (as published by Mag Garden) featuring Binchō-tan

びんちょうタン (Binchō-tan)
- Manga
- Written by: Takahito Ekusa
- Published by: Gakken (previous); Mag Garden (current)
- Magazine: Megami Magazine (previous); Monthly Comic Blade (current)
- Original run: November 2003 – November 2008
- Volumes: 4
- Anime television series
- Directed by: Kazuhiro Furuhashi
- Written by: Kazuhiro Furuhashi
- Music by: Taku Iwasaki
- Studio: Studio Deen
- Original network: JNN (TBS, BS-i, MBS)
- Original run: February 2, 2006 – March 30, 2006
- Episodes: 12
- Video game
- Developer: Marvelous Interactive
- Genre: Simulation game
- Platform: PlayStation 2
- Released: April 26, 2007 (limited ed./normal ed.)

Bincho-tan (びんちょうタン, Binchō-tan) is a mascot character, created by Japanese manga artist Takahito Ekusa (江草天仁, Ekusa Takahito) and produced by game goods company Alchemist.

The name is a play on words: binchōtan (備長炭) is a kind of charcoal, which is mainly used for cooking. However, -tan is a suffix created by the mispronunciation by young children of -san, that led to the suffix -chan. Relating to this dajare, the main cast is the moe anthropomorphic representations of different types of charcoal.

An anime began airing in February 2006 that was produced by Studio Deen. Animax, who have also broadcast all episodes within respective networks across Southeast Asia, South Asia, East Asia, translating and dubbing the series into English and other languages. The anime is set in Minabe, Wakayama, a location that is the largest producer of binchōtan charcoal in Japan.

== Characters ==
Binchō-tan (びんちょうタン)
Voiced by: Ai Nonaka
The main character in the anime. Binchō-tan is a young girl who lives by herself in an old house far from town and is always barefoot. As her name suggests, she often wears a piece of charcoal on her head. Each episode depicts a day in the life of Binchō-tan who needs to work in order to buy food and necessities. She is assumed to be an orphan because she lives by herself, refuses to answer shopkeepers who ask where her mother is and keeps to her habits of greeting and farewelling herself when traveling. Based on the story she's a hardworking child but willing to do all kinds of jobs given to her, for instance like deodorizing shoes. She is able to change her size, and may have other, unspecified abilities. She also treasures clothing made by her grandmother, which becomes a plot point in one episode. Binchō-tan is initially a very lonely person. Her birthday is on May 7.
Kunugi-tan (クヌギたん)
Voiced by: Sakura Nogawa
Kunugi-tan, who is seen many times in the anime before meeting any of the other characters directly, is a rich girl living in a mansion with many servants. Kunugi-tan is still very lonely despite being surrounded by many older people as well as her school peers. Unable to adventure outside her home and school due to her father's strict instructions carried out by her butler, Kunugi-tan often stares into the distance blankly, as if yearning for a bit of freedom. Kunugi-tan takes a great deal of interest in Bincho-tan and attempts to become better acquainted with her. She is terrified of bugs--although she is sometimes depicted with a stag beetle stuck to her dress. Kunugi-tan wears two pieces of what appears to be charcoal in her hair. Her name comes from the charcoal made from the sawtooth oak tree. Her birthday is on April 1.
Chiku-tan (ちくタン)
Voiced by: Mai Kadowaki
Chiku-tan is an enthusiastic person who enjoys inventing things and helping others. Her hair is held with a piece of bamboo charcoal and the end moves when she has ideas, usually during problems. The viewer sees that like Binchō-tan, Chiku-tan also lives far from town in an old house but lives with others, her younger sister, Chiku-rin and her grandfather. She is afraid of ghosts. Chiku-tan often takes on jobs like Binchō-tan and after meeting, they quickly became friends. Chiku and Binchō also begin raising a dog together. She is named after takesumi; bamboo charcoal, as chikurin means 'bamboo grove'. Her birthday is on August 24.
Chiku-rin (ちくリン)
Voiced by: Misato Fukuen
Chiku-tan's younger sister. Chiku-rin often mimics Chiku-tan, but is unable to talk fluently due to her age. Her birthday is on August 6.
Aroe (あろえ)
Voiced by: Momoko Saitō
Aroe is a young girl whose hair is made of Aloe, which does not benefit her as she often requires water. Aroe does not often make direct contact with the other characters in the anime and her appearances are often a side story--although she encounters them at the festival, and at the final scene of the final episode. Aroe's aloe-made hair bursts many of her vinyl wading pools due to its sharpness. Aroe is often seen throughout the series in a dizzy state, sometimes due to needing water and on other occasions due to misfortune. Her birthday is on June 15.
Ren-tan (れんタン)
Voiced by: Rina Satō
It is explained during the story that Ren-tan is a miko and as such enjoys playing a mokugyo and communicating with spirits. When Ren-tan summons spirits, they often approach Chiku-tan, much to her dismay. She lives at a Buddhist temple with her grandparents and enjoys eating dango. She has amazing luck and always wins raffles. On occasion she also wears a pair of glasses Chiku-tan gave to her after helping her with a raffle. Ren-tan means a charcoal briquette, the use of which in several famous suicide pacts implies a connection with the netherworld. Her birthday is on February 10.
Abemaki (アベマキ)
Voiced by: Rie Kugimiya
Kunugi-tan's elder maternal cousin. Her birthday is on March 30.
Sudajii (スダじい)
Voiced by: Tomomichi Nishimura
Kunugi-tan's household butler.
Ookushi (オーク氏)
Voiced by: Fumihiko Tachiki
Kunugi-tan's father. He has acrophobia (a fear of heights).
Pukashuu (プカシュー)
Voiced by: Miyu Matsuki
Binchō-tan's favorite character in a television show she watches. He appears on merchandise in one of the town's shops.
Yukari-tan (ユーカリたん)
Voiced by: Mai Nakahara
Yuri (ゆりお母さん)
Voiced by: Seiko Fujiki
Aroe's mother.
Sotetsu (そてつお父さん)
Aroe's father.
Saji (さじ)
A Japanese breed of dog called Kishu. He was adopted by Bincho-tan after he followed her to her house in the woods, after she gave him some food from a shop in the town. He was apparently a stray, as he had no collar when Bincho met him. He was given a collar made with one of the large nuts seen in the series. He was also given a kennel, made with one of Chiku-tan's inventions after it broke and failed to serve its intended purpose. After giving him a collar, Bincho decided to name him Saji, which, according to her means 'trifle'. Bincho explains to Kunugi, who was present with her at the time, that she chose 'Saji' because the dog had apparently been abandoned, as though it was just "a trifle".
Ubamega-san (うばめがさん)
Binchou-tan's mysterious benefactor. Sends her presents on her birthday and on New Year's Eve. His name comes from the oak tree which binchouzumi coal is made.
Narrator (ナレーションのおねえタン)
Voiced by: Kikuko Inoue

== Media ==
=== Manga ===
- Binchō-tan Vol.1 ISBN 4-86127-231-9 (Limited edition:ISBN 4-86127-223-8) - February 26, 2006
- Binchō-tan Vol.2 ISBN 4-86127-373-0 (Limited edition:ISBN 4-86127-329-3) - March 30, 2007

=== Anime ===
Nine episodes out of twelve episodes were aired without ending theme on TBS and BS-i. MBS in Kansai broadcast all episodes with ending theme. Incidentally, Wakayama in Kansai is famous for the production of binchōtan and Binchō-tan is the mascot of Kishu-Binchōtan Promotion Museum (紀州備長炭振興館, Kishu-Binchōtan Shinkoukan) operated by Minabegawa Forestry Society in Minabe, Wakayama.

No.	Title	Original release date
1	"Spring Awakening" "Haru no Omezame bin" (Japanese: 春のお目ざめびん)	February 2, 2006
An introduction to Binchō-tan and her peaceful lifestyle. Binchō-tan rides a duck across a river and goes to collect wild vegetables.
2	"Gets a Job" "Oshigoto Getto bin" (Japanese: お仕事げっとびん)	February 9, 2006
Binchō-tan goes to town to find a job to earn money and rice. She does a variety of jobs and shows off her unique talents for filtering water, cooking rice and deodorising shoes and refrigerators. On the way home, she admires some panties featuring Pukashuu, but cannot afford them. However, she finds a pair on sale, featuring her second favorite character, Tamakaeru, which makes her very happy. She returns home and, after a meal, has happy dreams.
3	"Bin's Birthday" "Bin no Otanjō-bin" (Japanese: びんのお誕生びん)	February 16, 2006
It is Binchō-tan's birthday and she receives gifts from her friend, Ubamega. She goes to town to look for work. On the way she hurts her knee and meets Chiku-tan, who tends to her wound. Chiku-tan is also looking for work. The two find jobs and go their separate ways. On the way home, Binchō-tan falls and spills her rice. Chiku-tan appears and helps her pick it up. She invites Binchō-tan back to her house for a surprise birthday party. This episode also introduces Kunugi-tan, who watches Binchō-tan with interest, several times throughout the day.
4	"Rainy Sunday" "Ame no Nichiyō-bin" (Japanese: 雨の日曜びん)	February 23, 2006
It's raining and Chiku-tan invents a device for walking in the rain without getting wet, which she calls a chikuma. Unfortunately, it is actually a takeuma, which has already been invented. She goes for a walk and meets Binchō-tan. The two sit in an old car and play word games. The sun comes out and they visit a bamboo grove. Kunugi-tan admires a rainbow from her balcony.
5	"Memories of Kimono" "Kimono no Omoide bin" (Japanese: 着物のおもひでびん)	March 2, 2006
Chiku-tan has a new invention for reaching job flyers. She gets a job serving lunch at Kunugi-tan's school, but finds that it is for two days later, when she is meant to attend a fair. As the fair is the reason she wanted to earn money in the first place, she trades jobs with Binchō-tan, for a job a day earlier in a bakery. Binchō-tan is told that she must dress nicely for her job. While Chiku-tan works, Binchō-tan spends the next day washing her treasured kimono. She wears it proudly to work the next day, but it rains and Kunugi-tan's coach splashes her with mud. After a day's work, she meets Kunugi-tan, who apologises and offers her money for a new kimono. Binchō-tan declines, as the kimono was a special gift from her grandmother. Chiku-tan attends the fair, only to find it is cancelled because of the rain.
6	"Work in the Night" "Yoru no Otsutome bin" (Japanese: 夜のおつとめびん)	March 9, 2006
On the way to work, Binchō-tan watches her favorite show through the window of a TV store. At a crucial moment, the channel is changed. Binchō-tan spends the day wondering how it ended. She works at the temple where Ren-tan lives but the two do not meet. Chiku-tan and Chiku-rin are at a shop, trying their luck in a raffle, but they do not win. Ren-tan arrives and wins the grand prize. She shares it with the two sisters. Binchō-tan receives some dango for her work at the temple and leaves half as an offering at a jizō. She watches a rerun of the TV show on her way home. Later that night, Ren-tan communes with the spirits. A passing Chiku-tan mistakes her for a ghost and spends the rest of the night terrified.
7	"Ramune and Candy Apples" "Ramune to Ringoame bin" (Japanese: ラムネとりんごあめびん)	March 16, 2006
Aroe is introduced. She has burst her paddling pool and decides to go to a swimming pool instead, but loses her entrance fee. Lightheaded from lack of water, she stumbles home but falls. Chiku-tan comes to her aid by pouring her grandfathers sake onto Aroe's head, which makes Aroe even dizzier. Chiku-tan and Chiku-rin make plans to attend a festival and meet Binchō-tan after she has finished her work for the day. Aroe also attends. Ren-tan has a fortune-telling booth. She tells Aroe's fortune and they meet up with Binchō-tan and the Chiku sisters and share some Ramune Ren-tan has won. Kunugi-tan watches the festival from afar. As she is not able to attend, her butler goes to the festival and brings her back some Ramune.
8	"Close Your Hands, Open Your Hands" "Musunde Hiraite bin" (Japanese: むすんでひらいてびん)	March 23, 2006
Chiku-tan invents a portable house but it breaks. Binchō-tan's bowl is chipped. On the way to buy a new one, she finds a dog and buys it some food. When she gets to the shop, she cannot afford a bowl. The shop owner asks her where her mother is, which appears to sadden her. She passes a school and watches some children singing with their teacher, before returning home for a lonely supper. She awakes the next morning to find the dog outside her house. She takes him with her to visit Chiku-tan and he takes a liking to the portable house, which resembles a kennel. They decide to keep him and name him Saji. The next day, Binchō-tan is invited back to the school and is asked to work there for a day every week. Chiku-tan is walking Saji and he drags her to the school to see Binchō-tan. The children are excited to see him and he takes a special liking to Kunugi-tan. Kunugi-tan is delighted to finally learn Binchō-tan's name. By the end of the episode, Binchō-tan has somehow acquired a bowl for herself and a bowl for Saji.
9	"A Stag Beetle is Following" "Kuwagata tsuiteru bin" (Japanese: クワガタついてるびん)	March 30, 2006
Binchō-tan goes to work at the school again and meets Kunugi-tan. While Kunugi-tan is teaching Binchō-tan to write, a beetle flies past and scares Kunugi-tan, who hates bugs. Later, a stag beetle attaches itself to Kunugi-tan's dress and Binchō-tan is not sure how to tell her without scaring her. To Binchō-tan's relief, it flies away before Kunugi-tan notices. The next day, Binchō-tan sends a letter to Kunugi-tan. Chiku-tan goes out to sell medicine on the street. She is having little success when Ren-tan arrives and shows her to a place that is better for business. She sells all of her wares and buys Ren-tan dango as a thank you gift. While they are eating it, the encounter Aroe, who is dizzy from lack of water again.
10	"The Baked Sweet Potatoes Season" "Oimo no Kisetsu bin" (Japanese: おイモの季節びん)	April 8, 2006
This episode was aired on only MBS. Binchō-tan goes to collect acorns, chestnuts and wild mushrooms and in the forest. She sets up a stall and trades them for money or food. She receives some sweet potatoes. As there are too many to eat by herself, she gives one to Chiku-tan, one to Kunugi-tan and one to Saji. Saji buries his and Chiku-tan and Binchō-tan decide to visit Ren-tan, help sweep the fallen leaves at the temple and make yakiimo using the leaves. Ren-tan tries to roast some chestnuts but there is a mishap. Chiku-tan invents a device for picking up hot potatoes. Aroe trips on Saji's sweet potato and takes it home. Everyone eats their sweet potatoes at the same time. When Binchō-tan returns home, she writes another letter to Kunugi-tan.
11	"First snow, First sledge, First flight" "Hatsu-yuki, Hatsu-zori, Hatsu-hikō bin" (Japanese: 初雪、初ぞり、初飛行びん)	April 15, 2006
This episode was aired on only MBS. Binchō-tan and Chiku-tan forage for berries, mushrooms and other things that grow in the forest to trade for food to store for winter and some winter clothes. They open up a stall which becomes very successful. Ren-tan uses her luck to help Chiku-tan win a bike in a raffle. As a thank you, Chiku-tan gives her some goggles. The next day, Ubamega sends Binchō-tan some New Year's gifts and it snows. Binchōtan, Chiku-tan, Chiku-rin and Ren-tan play in the snow and Chiku-tan discovers that skiing is not as easy as it looks. Kunugi-tan's father visits his daughter and they go on a hot-air balloon trip together. Binchōtan, Chiku-tan and Ren-tan take the bird bus so they can fly with her.
12	"A Letter to the Sky" "Osora ni Otegami bin" (Japanese: お空にお手紙びん)	April 15, 2006
This episode was aired on only MBS. It is New Years Eve and Chiku-tan and Chiku-rin are making mochi. Binchōtan has caught a cold and dreams of her grandmother. She feels lonely until Kunugi-tan, Ren-tan and Chiku-tan arrive to look after her. The next day, Aroe visits a shrine and her fortune tells her that something that will change her luck lies to the northwest, which is where she finds everyone else. Binchōtan writes a letter in the snow to her grandmother.

==== Music ====
The soundtrack of this animation includes the instrument Ondes Martenot.

Opening theme

- "Iroha" (いろは; "Colors"): Eps. 01 - 12
  Lyrics and composition by: rino
  Arrangement by: Kaoru Okubo
  Performed by: CooRie

Ending theme

- "Bincho Ondo" (びんちょう音頭): Eps. 01 - 12
  Lyrics by: Takahito Ekusa
  Composition by: Seiya Imakawa(LOOPCUBE)
  Arrangement by: Yūjirō Okazaki
  Performed by: Mai Kadowaki

==== DVD Releases ====
- Bincho-tan Vol.1 - May 26, 2006
- Bincho-tan Vol.2 - June 23, 2006
- Bincho-tan Vol.3 - July 28, 2006

=== Audio CDs ===
- Iroha (いろは) - February 8, 2006
- Bincho Ondo (びんちょう音頭) - February 24, 2006
- Soundtrack - March 24, 2006
- Characters' CD
  - Bincho-tan Character CD Vol.1 - November 25, 2005
  - Bincho-tan Character CD Vol.2 - December 22, 2005
- Drama CD
  - Bincho-tan Drama CD Vol.1 - January 25, 2006
  - Bincho-tan Drama CD Vol.2 - February 24, 2006
  - Bincho-tan Drama CD Vol.3 - March 24, 2006

=== Book ===
- Guide book (ISBN 4861272327) - January 26, 2006

=== Video game ===
The Bincho-tan Shiawase-goyomi (びんちょうタン しあわせ暦; lit. Bincho-tan - Happy Calendar) for PlayStation 2 and its limited edition were released by Marvelous Interactive on April 26, 2007.
