= List of Twin Princess of Wonder Planet characters =

This is a list of characters in Twin Princess of Wonder Planet.

== Sunny Kingdom ==
Fine (ファイン, Fine)
Voiced by: Megumi Kojima

- Age: 8 (1st series), 9 (2nd series)

Fine is one of the main protagonists of the series and one of the twin princesses of the Sun Kingdom.[2] She has red hair and eyes inherited from her mother. Fine is called one of the "least princess-like princesses in the history of Fushigi-boshi". She has a sweet tooth for food, especially cake, despite her terrible cooking skills. She often complains whenever she sees or hears something supernatural because she dislikes horror. She and Rein are the two who help each other the most. Fine is athletic but is not a good dancer. She is friendly and tries to be happy in every situation. Fine is very naive but is always the type to help her friends, making Noche fall in love with her. She tries to cheer people up despite not knowing the whole situation and does not often express herself, trying to ignore the feelings she is hiding. Fine can understand what Shade's little sister, Milky, is saying because they both love to eat. Fine is the first to trust Eclipse (Shade) and slowly falls in love with him. She never truly knew how much Bright loved her. Likewise, she never realized that Noche was in love with her. She has shown some jealousy in situations where Shade paid more attention to Rein, such as when he saved her rather than Fine. Her favorite color is red/pink and she is still in love with Shade in the second season. In the manga and anime, she falls in love with Shade, but in the manga he is in love with her twin, Rein. Although in the anime he seems to reciprocate her feelings.
Rein (レイン, Rein)
Voiced by: Yuko Goto

- Age: 8 (1st series), 9 (2nd series)

Rein is the other main protagonist of the series and the other twin princess of the Sun Kingdom. She has sea-green eyes and blue hair, inherited from her father. Although Rein is also called one of the "least princess-like princesses in the history of Fushigi-boshi," she enjoys dressing elegantly and wearing elaborate decorations. Rein becomes eccentric when it comes to romance and helps anyone in need. She is also a terrible cook, like Fine. Rein likes prince Bright in both, anime and manga and she never gave up on him. She has gotten jelous several times when he is with other girls, as we can see when she realizes that Bright cares more about her sister Fine. She also never realized that Fango had a crush on her, like Noche did on his twin sister. One of her main characteristics is that she is a big dreamer, fantasizing about her romance with Bright. She is adventurous, but also friendly, eccentric, and caring, which made Fango fall in love with her. Rein often thinks of positive and intelligent ways to solve things, which is why Fine depends on Rein for her ideas. She is also good at solving other people's problems and becomes a reporter for the Royal Wonder Academy. Her favorite color is blue. In the anime, she becomes Brigth's main love interest. In the manga, Rein is Shade's love interest and he is waiting for her to reciprocate his feelings, but she still has not given up on Brigth. Her theme color is blue.
Poomo (プーモ, Pumo)
Voiced by: Satomi Koorogi
A fairy-like creature to which Fine and Rein treats as their pet. He also ends his sentences with "pumo". Poomo helps Fine and Rein on their mission to save their planet. He is also shown to have many abilities such as cooking, sewing and piloting. He almost died at the end of the first season but the last Grace stone and Princess Grace saved him, allowing him to live with Fine and Rein forever. He is also smitten by the Ballerina in the anime.
Princess Grace (プリンセスグレース, Purinsetsu Gurasu)
Voiced by: Yuko Minaguchi
Grace is the legendary princess who once saved Fushigi-boshi in the ancient days. Although she died ages ago, she appears as an astral body inside the core of the Sun's blessing before she entrusts Fine and Rein in a mission to save the planet.
Camelot (キャメロット, Kamuroto)
Voiced by: Kazuko Sugiyama
Camelot is one of Fine and Rein's maids. She can be very bossy in the beginning of the series, but has a caring and enthusiastic side to educate Fine and Rein to become more proper and decent princesses.
Lulu (ルル, Ruru)
Voiced by: Misato Suzuki
Lulu is a cat who serves as Camelot's trainee. She gives suggestions to Camelot in some cases and writes down comprehensive notes of Camelot's work. Lulu appears for the first time in the 11th episode.
Elsa (エルザ, Erusa)
Voiced by: Ayako Kawasumi
Elsa is the queen of Sunny Kingdom and Fine and Rein's mother. She has a gentle and kind character. Fine and Rein admire her mostly because of the precious décors she made. Her hair and eyes are red (to which Fine inherited). She also cherishes the presents Fine and Rein gave her.
Truth (トゥルース, Turusu)
Voiced by: Wataru Hatano
Truth is the king of Sunny Kingdom and Fine and Rein's father. His eyes are sea-green and his hair is blue (to which Rein inherited). It is revealed that he gave Dream Seed flowers to Elsa when he proposed to her. He is also very protective of Rein, as Fango pursues her.
Omendo (オメンド)
Voiced by: Isamu Tanonaka
Omendo is the laboratory scientist of Sunny Kingdom. He analyzes all of the climate data that are processed by the weather stations. He is childhood friends with Camelot.
Tabby and Jill (タビーとジル)
Voiced by: Yuuki Tai (Tabi) and Masayo Kurata (Jill)
Tabi and Jill are some of the workers of the weather station. In the 4th episode, Fine and Rein help Tabby out because of his overwork while Jill is very worried about him.

== Moon Kingdom ==
Shade (シェイド, Sheido)
Voiced by: Junko Minagawa
Shade is the prince of the Moon Kingdom and Milky's older brother. He appears as Eclipse at the beginning of the series. His whip attacks are identified as Eclipse's. Whenever Shade goes out, he usually dresses up as Eclipse. He was obsessed with the power of Prominence because it had the ability to save Fushigiboshi. He knew about the blessing of weakening the sun. He has a mysterious yet serious aura about him in the first season, but he turns out to be very kind. Shade is very intelligent. He helped the twin princesses in the first season. His mother, Moon Malia, is very sick, and he cares for her wholeheartedly. It is for her that he aspires to become a doctor. He has a pet dragon named Regina. He has a conflicted relationship with Bright. At first, he seems to be disliked by anything due to her cold attitude, but he develops a crush on Rein in the manga. In the anime, His interest is more focused on Fine at the end of the first season and throughout the second season, implying that he reciprocates Fine's feelings.
Milky (ミルキー, Miruki)
Voiced by: Kazuko Kojima
Milky is the princess of the Moon Kingdom and Shade's younger sister. She's a toddler that can travel around places (by sitting on her floating star). Milky is more likely to have trouble communicating people with her "Babu" babbling, but people like Shade and Fine can understand what she means. She is also gluttonous like Fine, and often eats up all of the food before Fine can reach it. She likes Narlo.
Regina (レジャイナ, Rejina)
Regina is Shade's pet dragon that he used to travel to all the countries.
Moon Malia (ムーンマリア)
Voiced by: Keiko Han
Moon Malia is the queen of the Moon Kingdom and Shade and Milky's mother. Her mood and health is measured by the aurora waves floating in the sky. She is usually sick. She is very fond of Rein in the manga.
Chuuba (チューバ)
Voiced by: Kiri Yoshizawa
Chuuba is a very accurate rat fortune teller.
Monmon Golem (モンモンゴーレム, Monmon Goremu)
Monmon Golem is the beast that sleeps deep inside the temple. At certain times of the year, he wakes up and blows the obscuring clouds away from the moon to allow moonlight into the Moon Kingdom. Momon Golem also haves different tastes than ordinary humans because he can eat Fine and Rein's cooking and even called it delicious.
Queen Scorpion (女王サソリ)
Queen Scorpion is a very big scorpion that comes only when her little scorpions get defeated. She is very sensitive to loud noises.
Mia (ミーア)
Voiced by: Rina Satō
Mia is a local worker near the Star Lake.

== Flame Kingdom ==
Lione (リオーネ) (Lee-on-eh)
Voiced by: Misato Fukuen

- Age: 11 (1st series), 12 (2nd series)

Lione is the princess of the Flame Kingdom and Tio's older sister. She has orange-reddish hair and hazel-brown eyes. Lione is too personal and often takes thoughts deeply. Also, Lione is not very fond of dancing, but she knows how to samba. She even knows how to cheer Tio up. Lione has some useful skills like driving and being able to tell how Bo Dragon is feeling. In the manga it is shown that she is most closest with Rein than all the other princesses of Fushigi Boshi

Note: It is shown that Lione did Samba dancing for the first time at the annual Samba party the 32nd episode. Note: It is shown that Lione was using a special stone/gem to see how Bo Dragon was feeling in the 3rd episode.

Lione is a gentle princess who's caring and sweet. She is shy and sometimes nervous, but she is never afraid to try. Also, she is very loyal to her kingdom and would do anything to save it. She has reddish-orange hair and hazel-brown eyes. Lione loves Flame Kingdom as much as she loves her friends, Princesses Rein and Fine of Sunny Kingdom. She is half lion and half human.

Tio (ティオ)
Voiced by: Vanilla Yamazaki (Episodes 1 - 26), Shihomi Mizowaki (Episodes 27 - 51)

Age: 9 (1st series), 10 (2nd series)

Tio is the prince of the Flame Kingdom and Lione's brother. He likes to play with his katana (saber). Tio often makes appearances because he tries to save Fine and Rein from trouble. He always fails every time he saves the twin princesses. He sees Shade as his hero and asked Shade to be his assistant.

Wohl (ウォル)
Voiced by: Toru Okawa

Wohl is the king of the Flame Kingdom and Lione and Tio's father. He is very dynamic and his excitement is emphasized by the torches in the throne room.

Nina (ニーナ)

Voiced by: Yukie Maeda

Nina is the queen of the Flame Kingdom and Lione and Tio's mother.

Howan (ハワン)
Voiced by: Kenta Miyake

Howan is a cook and a manager of a Chinese-style restaurant in the Flame Kingdom. The special‐feature menu of his restaurant is Flaming Hot Fried Rice (Heramera Chaofan).

Bo Dragon (ボードラゴン)
Voiced by: Keniji Hirai

Bo Dragon is an extremely large dragon living inside the volcano. When Bo Dragon is sick, he coughs volcanic ashes.

Thunderbolt (落雷)

Thunderbolt is a creature with two flame tails. When Shade rides on Regina, Tio rides on him. He is sometimes incompetent with Tio. Thunderbolt's best appetite is Poomo.

== Water Drop Kingdom ==
Mirlo (ミルロ)
Voiced by: Sachi Sukigara

- Age 10 (first series), 11 (second series)

Mirlo is the princess of the Water Drop Kingdom. She is a shy and soft-spoken girl who does not wish to offend others, so she tends to go with what others say, especially her mother. In the original concept and series, Mirlo is a talented artist and often shown painting landscapes of the castle and the city and countryside surrounding it. She also takes care of her younger brother, Narlo, often.

She won the Best Sports Princess Party in spite of her lack of athleticism thanks to her sportsmanship and helping get the contest back on track after the fight between Altezza and Sophie. She was going to marry Estevan, the young son of wealthy businessman, in order to get the funds to fix the Drop Kingdom's cloud making machinery, but Fine and Rein exposed it as a plot by Roman to install a puppet on the throne. Mirlo admits she is not ready to marry, but the businessman will help pay for the repairs anyway. Although she usually acquiesces to her mother, she found the courage to tell her to spend more time with Narlo.

In the second series, she received an anonymous love letter that turned out to be from Pastel, the prince of the Art Planet, before he had to leave to tend to his ailing father.

Mirlo is a much different character in the manga. A vain and spoiled girl, she causes trouble for Fine and Rein. While it appeared she was meant to a primary adversary for the twins, she disappeared after the third chapter until a brief appearance in the final chapter.

There was some confusion as to how Mirlo's name is to be spelled in English. In the show, it was spelled Mirlo in one instance and Milro in another. Similarly, the first Character Detail Book spelled it Mirlo and the second Milro.

Narlo (ナルロ)
Voiced by: Haruhi Terada

- Age: 1

Narlo is the prince of the Water Drop Kingdom and Mirlo's baby brother. He is about the same age as Milky.

After the events at the Flame Kingdom's New Years Talent Show, he began to call for his mom by yelling "Gabin!!" ("Gabin" means "Oh my GOSH!" in Japanese.) Both Bright and the Twins tried to break him of the habit, but got him halfway to "Ma-bin".

Nalro seems to have a crush on Milky and starts riding with her on her star.

Unlike Mirlo/Milro, Narlo's name has been spelled consistently in English in show-related material.

Yamul (ヤムル)
Voiced by: Mahiru Konno

Yamul is the queen of the Water Drop Kingdom and Mirlo and Narlo's mother. She is often busy running her kingdom, sequestered in her office to do paperwork. She even takes audiences in her office as often as the throne room. She is very strict and firm and wants Mirlo to behave like a proper princess. However, she loves her children and appreciates when Mirlo speaks up on behalf of Narlo when he feels ignored.

Pump (ポンプ)

Pump is the king of the Water Drop Kingdom and Mirlo and Narlo's father.

Ada and Ida (エイダとアイダ)
Voiced by: Aiko (Ada), Yuko (Ida)

Ada and Ida are twin sisters living on the outskirts of a village in the Water Drop Kingdom's swamps. They fish in the swamps and share some of their catch with the local birds. However, the Blessing of the Sun weakening causes the water temperature to drop and their catches got smaller. Looking to sew unrest, Bright and Boomo tell them they can get food by impersonating Fine and Rein and threaten to curse anyone who refuses to hand over the food for free. When the two are discovered, the villagers forgive them since it was for taking care of the birds.

Esteban (エステバン)

Esteban is the boy that Mirlo was supposed to marry. However, it was a scheme by Roman as his tutor was spoiling him to make him simple minded and easy to control. When the conspiracy is thwarted, Esteban says he does not know what marriage is. While the marriage is called off, he and Mirlo continue to be friends.

== Seed Kingdom ==
The 11 Seed Princesses (?)
Voiced by: Nozomi Masu (Ichele), Misato Suzuki (Gorchel), Kazuko Kojima (Harney)

It is hard to tell who is who because they all look alike with the exception of the hair color. From the Futago Hime Character Detail book (CDB), the seed princesses names are Ichele, Nina, Saya, Shiyon, Gorchel, Loloa, Nursya, Harney, Quarry, Julia, and Joiner. Their names are subtly related to numbers from one to eleven in Japanese.

Solo ((ソロ))

- Age: 8 (1st series), 9 (2nd series)

Solo is the prince of the Seed Kingdom and the 11 Seed Princesses' brother. In birthday's original concept, Solo is a talented violin player.

The King ((キング))
Voiced by: Toshitaka Hirono

The king of the Seed Kingdom (the 11 Seed Princesses and Solo's father) is completely against the monkey's invasion. He is, however, very impatient and never gives people a chance to finish what they are saying.

Flower ((フラウア))
Voiced by: Yumiko Hori

Flower is the Queen of the Seed Kingdom and the 11 Seed Princesses and Solo's mother.

Snowy (?)

Snowy is a strange creature in the forest that creates mystical visions.

== Jewelry Kingdom ==
Bright (ブライト)
Voiced by: Tetsuya Kakihara

Bright is the prince of the Jewel Kingdom and Altezza's older brother. Although he and Shade are the same age, he is a true gentleman, but in truth, he has a dark and vengeful side. He has a huge crush on Fine at the beginning of the anime and throughout the manga. His mood changes when he is possessed by the power of darkness (from kind to evil). He believed he should become King of Fushigiboshi. Halfway through the series, Eclipse always takes his place when it comes to saving the twins. After Bright is freed from the power of darkness, he and Shade seem to get along. At the end of the first season he asks Rein to a dance implying that his feelings have changed and now he reciprocates Rein's feelings. He is a member of the Royal Wonder Academy's fencing club. His role becomes smaller, like Shade's in the second season, but he still intervenes to save the twins and his friends, just as Shade. Bright's main love interest in the manga is Fine, but in the anime it seems that he ends up reciprocating Rein's feelings.

Altezza (アルテッサ)
Voiced by: Kaori Mizuhashi

- Age: 11(1st series), 12 (2nd series)

Altezza is the princess of the Jewelry Kingdom and Bright's younger sister. Unlike other princesses, she aggravates easily. Altezza often yells at people (such as Sophie) and gets mad when something that she wants never gets done. She also likes to show off. A good thing about her is how she really cares for her brother, Bright. She is admired by Prince Auler. Altezza would do anything to win a competition at a Princess Party, no matter what. In the second season she seems to have gotten closer to Auler.

Aaron (アーロン)
Voiced by: Daisuke Ono

Aaron is the king of the Jewelry Kingdom and Altezza and Bright's father.

Camelia (カメリア)
Voiced by: Haruhi Terada

Camelia is the queen of the Jewelry Kingdom and Altezza and Bright's mother. She is very dramatic and faints when something bad happens. Altezza might have inherited her personality because she also shows off, but cares for Bright and Altezza deeply.

Ms. Butterfly (ミセスバタフライ)

Ms. Butterfly is a local jewelry maker. She is interested in elaborate designs. Her main competitor is Sirius.

Sirius (セリアス)

Sirius (also known as Serias) is another jewelry maker. Unlike Ms. Butterfly, his mother has worked with Fine and Rein's mother, Elsa, in the past. He is not too obsessed in elaborate designs, but puts his heart into all of the jewelry he makes.

Puppet (プペット)
Voiced by: Ai Shimizu

Puppet is a moveable-type doll that lives in the junkyard at a nearby amusement park called "Doll Town". She hopes that her real owner retrieves her.

== Windmill Kingdom ==
Sophie (ソフィー)
Voiced by: Rina Satō

Sophie is the princess of the Windmill Kingdom and Auler's sister. She and Altezza may have a bad relationship, but they are friends. They are the members of "losers' club", according to Sophie, but they were friends after all. She is soft-spoken and likes flowers. She irritates people with her overly uncaring attitude towards important things. She had a small windmill that plays a tune and can control the winds in her kingdom. She often has "slow moments"

Auler (アウラー)
Voiced by: Hiro Shimono

Auler is the prince of the Windmill Kingdom and Sophie's brother. He has a crush on Altezza.

Randa (?)
Voiced by: Masayuki Katou

Randa is the king of the Windmill Kingdom and Sophie and Auler's father.

Elena (?)
Voiced by: Junko Shimeno

Elena is the queen of the Windmill Kingdom and Sophie and Auler's mother

== Sea Kingdom ==
Pearl (パール)
Voiced by: Rumi Shishido

- Age: 7-8

Pearl is the princess of the unknown country, Sea Kingdom. She lives with her friends, but not her parents. Her parents rarely visit her because they attend government affairs. However, they love her as much as she does. She has a very beautiful singing voice.

== Unclassified ==
Naginyo (ナギーニョ)
Voiced by: Naoki Yanagi

Naginyo is a spirit sent by Princess Grace to lookout for Fine and Rein. He puts most prized possession is his harp (which he calls it a violin) as he often plays it to entertain ladies. Fine and Rein find his harp playing skills slightly annoying, but his lyrics actually tell the truth of things. He has green hair and green eyes. If you look at his clothes it has each embel of each Kingdom

Nacchi (ナッチ)
Voiced by: Yuko Sasamoto

Nacchi is a trapeze performer in a circus. Being the star of the show, her trapeze act is the main attraction for the circus. After Nacchi suffered an injury, she lost her guts. Luckily, Fine and Rein are there to help her.

== Enemies ==
Roman (ローマン)
Voiced by: Keiji Hirai

Roman is a former Moon Chancellor of the Moon Kingdom. His main goal to steal the Prominence and use it for himself. After being unsuccessful, he gets sucked into the dark void.

Rau (ラウ) & Yan (ヤン)
Voiced by: Takashi Kurota (Rau), Keiichirou Endou (Yan)

Rau and Yan are two of Roman's henchmen. Their goal is to analyze and steal the power of the Prominence for Roman. They also appear in the second series. (Helper of the Vice-President)

Boomo (ブウモ)
Voiced by: Yukiji

Boomo is the dark version of Poomo. He often leads many evil activities but gets crazy sometimes. Boomo was originally good, but turned evil when he wanted to be the king of other Poomos. It is also common to find Boomo doing strange activities. He had a crush on Princess Pearl in Sea Kingdom (Unknown Kingdom).

Black Crystal King (ブラッククリスタルキング)
Voiced by: Norio Wakamoto

Black Crystal King is the ultimate enemy. It is the original source for all the powers of darkness. It also controls what Bright does, forcing him to use the Prominence when someone disobeys him. Although the Black Crystal does not walk by itself, it can expand rapidly. The fuel for it are the people's sadness. However, that Black Crystal King was an imposter, while the real one only appears in the Gyu! series.

== Fushigiboshi no Futago Hime Gyu! ==
Note: In the sequel, characters from the previous series come along with new characters.

Sasha (シャシャ) & Carla (カーラ)
Voiced by: Eriko Kawasaki (Sasha), Fuyuka Ooura (Carla)

- Age: 12

Sasha and Carla are special friends of Planet Celeb. They follow Elizabetta and help make her introduction grand and are used to do the difficult tasks for her.

Elizabetta (エリザべータ)
Voiced by: Yuko Maruyama

- Age: 13

Elizabetta is the princess of Planet Celeb. Acting like an idol, she is very ignorant of other people. Elizabetta talks monotonously like an old woman. When it comes to doing hard tasks, Sasha and Carla do it for her. She confessed to Fango by giving him chocolates in episode 45.

Chiffon (シフォン)
Voiced by: Emiri Katō

- Age: 12

Chiffon is the princess of Planet Mathematics. At the age of 6 she is a brainchild of education. Chiffon is well known for earning the most points at school. After she meets Fine and Rein, she starts "observing" them and is constantly calling them "Fushigi" (Mysterious) and addressing them as "Fushigi Hime" (Mysterious Princesses). She loves Toma.

Toma (トーマ)
Voiced by: Shinnosuke Tachibana

- Age: 14

Toma is the prince of Planet Wulpurgis. Being the first person to be possessed by Edward, he makes different beasts with his powers in order to destroy the fun. Later in the series, he hides a very powerful portrait of Edward behind secret corridors. Toma might have develop some feelings for Chiffon.

Noche (?)
Voiced by: Nozomi Masu

- Age: 11

Noche is the prince of Planet Orchestra. He enjoys playing music on his violin and frequently cries in many events. He has a crush on Fine. His father once forced Fine to marry him on 42nd episode (in the 2nd series), but they didn't marry due to Noche's disagreement for Fine. In the end of the 2nd season he gets jealous that Fine is dancing with Shade.

March (マーチ)
Voiced by: Nanae Katō

- Age: 11

March is the princess of Planet Morals. She spies on Fine and Rein and deducts points for their wrongdoing.

Fango (ファンゴ)
Voiced by: Ryousuke Sakamaki

- Age: 11-12

Fango is the prince of Planet Gretel. He appears quite reserved, doesn't talk to people and is known to get in trouble. He is good at martial arts. At first, he have a crush on Rein (which makes Shade, Bright and King Truth anxious) but later also started noticing Elizabetta after she gave him chocolates in episode 45.

Lemon (レモン)
Voiced by: Asuka Nakase

- Age: 11

Lemon is the princess of Planet Naniwan. Her most prized possession is the Golden Fan because she can use it to do many amusing tricks that no one else can do. Injuries from her tricks are unknown.

Melon (メロン)
Voiced by: Ai Maeda

- Age: 14

Melon is the prince of Planet Naniwan. He is Lemon's brother and helps her understand the accident she had before. He seems to somewhat like Princess Sophie.

Kyukyu (キュキュ) & Pyupyu (ピュピュ)
Voiced by: Rina Satō (KyuKyu), Tomoko Kanaeda (PyuPyu)

Kyukyu and PyuPyu are Angels from the Soilel Bell. They activate Fine and Rein's magic. Though, they're only toddlers, they cause numerous troubles anywhere for Fine and Rein including property damage and costing them Points.

Bibin (ビビン)
Voiced by: Yuki Shiratori

Bibin is the princess from the Black Planet who attends at the mysterious Black Academy, she was entrusted by the also mysterious Black Principal to gather "Unhappy Fruits" which are needed for her graduation as a really evil queen. She revives Edward and nickname him as Edochin, however rather than reviving him with his original form, she revives him with a hybrid between pig and bunny who have the ability of flying, but none of his original powers. Bibin and Edochin frequently causes trouble, however their plans always ends in a failure thanks to Fine and Rein constant interference.

Head Teacher (教頭)

Also known as the Vice-Principal, favors Elizabetta frequently by doing everything that would benefit her. He is impolite to Fine and Rein due to their childish behaviour. He is the ex-minister of the Moon Kingdom during the 1st series.

Tanba Rin (タンバ・りん)

Tanba Rin is the instructor at the Royal Wonder Academy. She is relatively small compared to everyone else, including her students. Her name is a play on the musical instrument "tambourine".

Ban Jo (バン・ジョー)

Ban Jo is also the instructor at the Royal Wonder Academy. His method of teaching includes yelling. He has a crush on Tanba Rin. His name is a play on the musical instrument "banjo".

Hiruzu (六本木ヒルズ)

Hiruzu is the prince of Planet Gorgeous.
