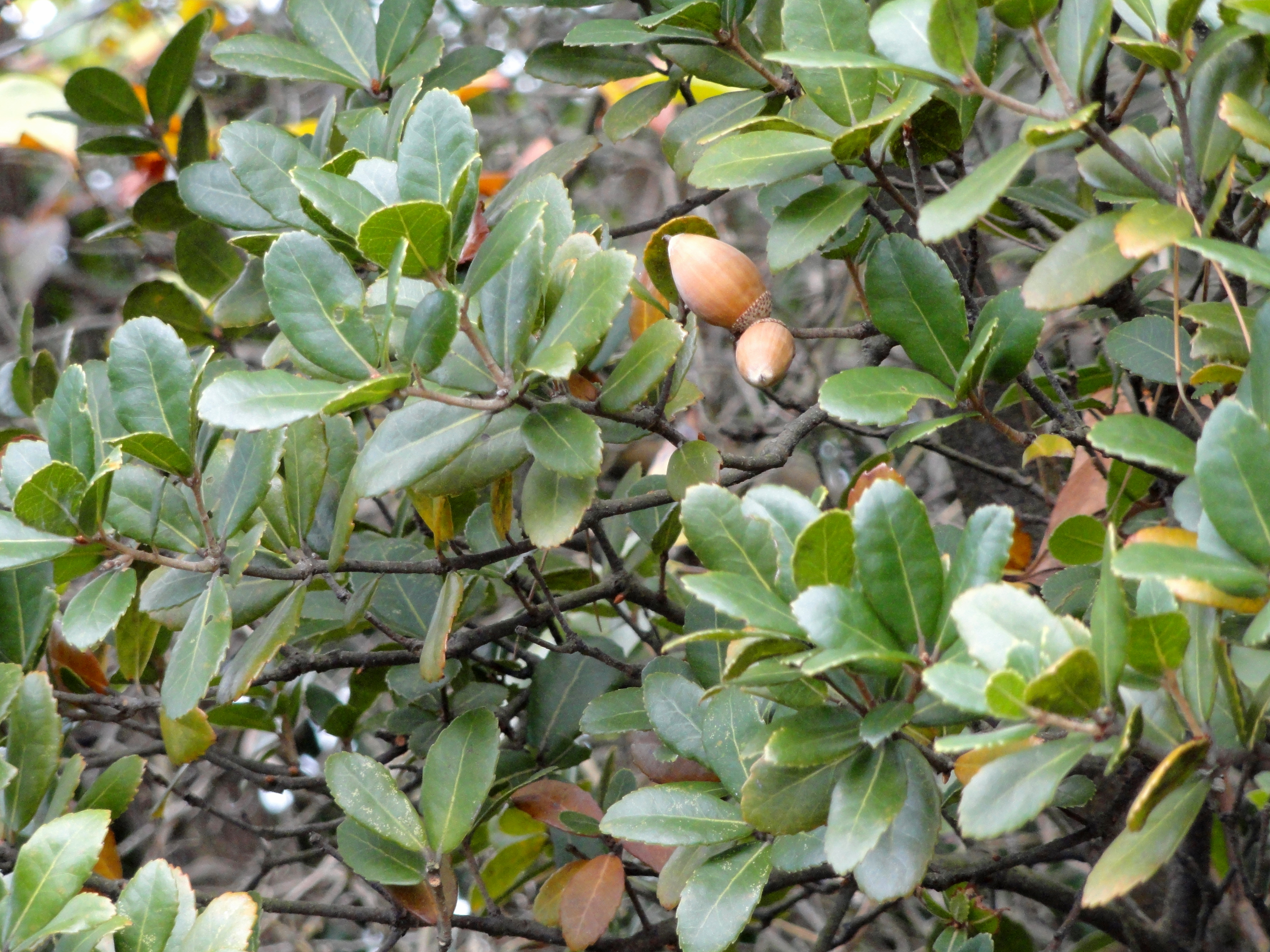

Conservation status
- Least Concern (IUCN 3.1)

Scientific classification
- Kingdom: Plantae
- Clade: Embryophytes
- Clade: Tracheophytes
- Clade: Angiosperms
- Clade: Eudicots
- Clade: Rosids
- Order: Fagales
- Family: Fagaceae
- Genus: Quercus
- Subgenus: Quercus subg. Cerris
- Section: Quercus sect. Ilex
- Species: Q. phillyreoides

Binomial name
- Quercus phillyreoides A.Gray

Synonyms
- Maesa singuliflora H.Lév.; Quercus fokienensis Nakai; Quercus fooningensis Hu & W.C.Cheng; Quercus ilex var. phillyreoides (A.Gray) Franch.; Quercus myricifolia Hu & W.C.Cheng; Quercus phillyreoides var. crispa Matsum.; Quercus phillyreoides f. crispa (Matsum.) Kitam. & T.Horik.; Quercus phillyreoides subsp. fokienensis (Nakai) Menitsky; Quercus phillyreoides var. sinensis Schottky; Quercus phillyreoides var. subcrispa Makino; Quercus phillyreoides var. wrightii (Nakai) Menitsky; Quercus phillyreoides f. wrightii (Nakai) Kitam. & T.Horik.; Quercus pillyraeoides A.Gray; Quercus singuliflora (H.Lév.) A.Camus; Quercus tinfanensis A.Camus; Quercus wrightii Nakai

= Quercus phillyreoides =

Species of plant

Quercus phillyreoides is a species of flowering plant in the genus Quercus, placed in subgenus Cerris and section Ilex. It is evergreen, withstands frost and can be grown in hardiness zone 7. It is native to southern China, the Ryukyu Islands, and Japan, and has been introduced to Korea.

== Origin of Name ==
In Japanese, the common name of Quercus phillyreoides is Ubamegashi. The origin of this name is uncertain. One theory asserts that ubame means 'old woman's eyes' (from uba = ‘old woman’ + me = ‘eye’; gashi = ‘oak’). This supposedly references the yellow-brown color of new leaves on the oak, although the connection to the eyes of old women is unclear. A more widely accepted theory is that the 'me' in ubame derives from a homonym that translates to 'new buds/leaves'.

== Uses ==
The Japanese use Quercus phillyreoides or ubame oak to produce binchōtan, a type of charcoal and a traditional variety of vegetal activated carbon. It has found use as a street tree in a number of European cities.
