= Magical Witch Punie-chan =

Japanese manga and anime series

- Cover of the first volume of manga as released in Japan by Kadokawa Shoten.

大魔法峠
- Genre: Magical girl, black comedy
- Manga
- Written by: Hideki Ohwada
- Published by: Kadokawa Shoten
- Magazine: Ace MomoGumi
- Original run: February 2001 – March 2007
- Volumes: 4
- Original video animation
- Directed by: Tsutomu Mizushima
- Written by: Tsutomu Mizushima
- Music by: Ryuji Takagi
- Studio: Studio Barcelona
- Licensed by: NA: Media Blasters
- Released: March 3, 2006 – October 21, 2008
- Runtime: 12 minutes
- Episodes: 8

Magical Witch Punie-chan (大魔法峠, Dai Mahō-Tōge), also known as The Great Magical Gap, is a Japanese manga series. It is a parody of magical girl anime, and often uses the juxtaposition of cute characters with brutal violence for humor. The title Dai Mahō-Tōge (大魔法峠; "The Pass of the Great Magic") is a pun on The Sword of Doom (大菩薩峠, Dai-bosatsu Tōge; "The Pass of the Great Buddha"), a 1966 jidaigeki movie. The anime was released in the U.S. on October 21, 2008, by Media Blasters as a subtitled release and was later released with an English dub as well as the original Japanese audio on June 28, 2011, in a special edition.

== Plot ==
The story revolves around a young woman named Punie Tanaka who is princess of Magical Land. In order for her to become queen, however, she must become a transfer student in a Japanese high school. Due to her potential to become the next ruler, she has many enemies that wish to assassinate her. This proves difficult to them because Punie is both skilled at martial arts and possesses magic powers which she uses to quickly defeat her enemies.

== Characters ==
=== Main characters ===
Punie Tanaka (田中 ぷにえ, Tanaka Punie)
Voiced by: Rina Satō (Japanese); Veronica Taylor (English)
The protagonist and, according to flashbacks, the antagonist of the story, Punie has come to Japan in order to prove herself worthy of becoming the next Queen of Magical Land. As the princess of Magical Land who is next in line of the throne, she has many enemies whom she defeats with her submission maneuvers and magic powers. Punie may seem young and innocent, but when threatened (and she feels threatened very easily) she quickly becomes violent and aggressive. She maintains the image of a cute and carefree girl on the front, hiding her true nature as a ruthless witch who has no second thoughts killing people, unicorns and vegetables or to make use of her friends to achieve her aim. Her incantation is 'Lyrical Tokarev, Kill Them All'. Punie is an expert on applying submission holds, believing in this particular branch of infighting technique as the 'true way of the royalty'. She prefaces the name of her submission maneuvers with "Princess" such as the "Princess Head Lock" or "Princess Figure Four Leg Lock". Her name is a pun on Kunie Tanaka, a famous actor (not an actress). It is also revealed in her battle with Elise that she can freely dislocate her shoulders as and when required.
Paya-tan / Captain Paya Livingston (パヤたん / パヤ = リビングストン大佐, Paya-tan / Paya Ribingusuton Taisa)
Voiced by: Chiwa Saitō and Jouji Nakata (Japanese); Michal Friedman and Dan Green (English)
Punie's companion from Waku-Waku Mascot Village, Paya-tan is a dog-like creature with a single horn, and two distinct personalities. He became Punie's mascot after she defeated him in unarmed combat with her Princess Head Lock, although not before warning Punie that he will grab any opportunity to make attempts on her life, which she confidently agreed. While assisting Punie, he behaves cutely and speaks in a high-pitched voice. At other times, he attempts to assassinate Punie and behaves in a more adult fashion, speaking in a deep voice and smoking a cigarette. Paya-tan served as an army colonel during the Vietnam War and it has also been implied that he had fought in Russia as well. He also is extremely flexible and can rotate his arms and legs in a 360 motion.
Tetsuko Koku (国 鉄子, Koku Tetsuko)
Voiced by: Noriko Shitaya (Japanese); Rebecca Soler (English)
Tetsuko is Punie's classmate and best friend. An avid Railfan, she is also the president of the school's Railway Research Club. Despite being one of the regulars on the receiving end of Punie's insidious plans - usually as a sacrificial lamb for traps laid by her enemies, she appears to be innocently oblivious of the true nature of Punie's character. Her name comes from Kokutetsu (Japanese National Railways), followed by -ko, a typical suffix for girl's name. As such, her actions are often identified with imagery of trains, which appear in the form of montages.
Anego (姉御, Anego)
Voiced by: Ayako Kawasumi (Japanese); Carol Jacobanis (English)
Anego is Punie's classmate and rival. She leads a girl gang that tries to maintain their power in the school while causing general mayhem. She later befriends Punie and Tetsuko, although she is always suspicious and wary of Punie's evil intentions throughout the series. Despite her rugged appearance, Anego exhibits the qualities of a tsundere character in one episode when she develops a crush on a medic in her school. Ultimately Anego reverts to her old character after Punie put her through a harrowing first date with the medic.

=== Supporting characters ===
Esmeralda Tanaka (田中 エスメラルダ, Tanaka Esumeraruda)
Voiced by: Mami Koyama (Japanese); Eva Christensen (English)
Punie's Mother and queen of Magical Land. She was responsible for the coup which eliminated the previous rulers and gave herself political power. Her incantation, as revealed in the anime OAV's fourth omake, is "Lyrical Tokarev, Nobody, No Cry".
Kimihiko Tanaka (田中 キミヒコ, Tanaka Kimihiko)
Voiced by: Nobuo Tobita (Japanese); Wayne Grayson (English)
Punie's Father. He is the submissive one in the relationship and is deeply concerned for his daughter's well-being. During the anime OAV series and the omake, Esmeralda often makes use of him as furniture by sitting on him.
Pyun Tanaka (田中 ぴゅん, Tanaka Pyun)
Voiced by: Ayaka Saitō (Japanese); Debora Rabbai (English)
Potaru Tanaka (田中 ぽたる, Tanaka Potaru)
Voiced by: Kana Hanazawa (Japanese); Michele Knotz (English)
Punie's little sisters who sneak to Japan in order to assassinate her. They possess the "Ring of Immortal", a magical heirloom which they use in order to summon a spirit to destroy Punie. They activate this artifact with the incantation "Lyrical Tokarev, Destroy All Evil". Whether or not this is their own personal incantation or the activation incantation for the Ring of Immoral is left to conjecture. When executing combination attacks, they preface their attack names with "Gemini" such as the "Gemini Knee Drop" and the "Gemini Low Kick".
Elise von Barbaroque aka Hole Digger Elly (エリーゼ = フォン = バルバロック、通称 穴掘りエリィ, Erīze fon Barubarokku / Anahori Erī)
Voiced by: Mamiko Noto (Japanese); Georgette Reilly (English)
The daughter of the previous king of Magical Land, Elise seeks to exact revenge against Punie for stealing her place as the next-in-line for the throne after Punie's mother Esmeralda's coup. She digs large diameter holes in the ground as traps, resulting in a nickname of "Hole Digger Elise" from Punie to her displeasure. She appears in episode 3 of the OVA making a direct challenge to Punie. Despite Elise's apparent advantage against Punie in unarmed combat in the early stages of their face-off, she eventually succumbs and is subsequently tortured with as many as 7 different kinds of submission holds and locks off-camera before Tetsuko and Anego. After the initial encounter, Elise becomes Punie's classmate, and sits behind Tetsuko.
Gesomi (ゲソ美, Gesomi)
Voiced by: Saeko Chiba (Japanese); Gladys Weiner (English)
A strict and sadistic teacher who loves catching and torturing those who cheat on her tests. She will not change her way too serious attitude about passing tests fair and square even if there is war going on in her class at the moment. She comes to substitute Punie and Anego's homeroom teacher on an important math test.

== OVA episodes ==
| No. | Title |
|---|---|
| 1 | "The Miracle Rod Brings Terror to the School Festival?! The Episode Where Magical Princess Punie Arrives!" "Mirakuru Roddo de Gakuen-sai wa Dai Panikku☆!? Mahō no Purinsesu Punie-chan Tōjō!! no Maki" (ミラクルロッドで学園祭は大パニック☆!?魔法のプリンセスぷにえちゃん登場!!の巻) |
At the school festival, Punie uses her powers to stop Anego and her gang from disrupting Tetsuko's curry booth.
| 2 | "The Crazy and Cute Mascot! The Episode Where Paya-Tan Arrives!" "O Chamede Kyūto na Masukotto☆Paya-tan Tōjō no Maki" (お茶目でキュートなマスコット☆パヤたん登場の巻) |
Paya-tan comes to Japan to be by Punie's side. Punie has a flashback to her visit to the Mascot Village when she had to duel with Paya-tan.
| 3 | "Holy Crap, Decisive Battle of Breakfast?! If you don't pray you'll be killed, Cuckoo-san!" "Dokkiri★Burekkufasuto Dai Sakusen☆!? Nakanunara Koroshite Shimare Hototogisu-san~tsu!! no maki" (どっきり★ブレックファースト大作戦☆!?鳴かぬなら殺してしまえホトトギスさんっ!!の巻) |
Elise von Barbaroque comes to exact her revenge against Punie, only to be defeated by Punie's superior fighting skills.
| 4 | "Aw, so cute! Did you know there's a 1/120 chance of giving birth to twins?" "Iya〜n Kawaii! Futago no Umareru Kakuritsu wa 120-Bun no 1-tte Shitteru? no Maki" (いや〜んカワイイ!ふたごの生まれる確率は120分の1って知ってる?の巻) |
Pyun and Potaru show up to assassinate their elder sister, but despite help from a kami they are unable to defeat her.
| 5 | "So only test scores measure the worth of a human being? There's no way I'm worth 0 points. Really." "Tesuto no Tensū Dake de Ningen no Kachi ga Hakarerun desu ka> Dōse Watashi wa 0-tendesu yo Ā Sō yo no Maki" (テストの点数だけで人間の価値が測れるんですか?どうせ私は0点ですよああそうよの巻) |
Punie-chan and her classmates take a midterm test, but are forced to resort to extreme measures in order to cheat due to a sadistic substitute teacher.
| 6 | "You had swept your bangs back for the first time when I saw you under the apple tree. The flower-comb in your hair, I thought you were a flower, too." "Mada Age Someshi Magaemi no, Ringo no Moto ni Mieshi Toki, Mae ni Sashitaru no, Hana aru Kimi to Omohikeri...... no Maki" (まだ上げそめし前髪の、林檎のもとに見えしとき、前にさしたる花櫛の、花ある君と思ひけり......の巻) |
Anego goes on a date with Yamada to an amusement park, only to have Punie and Tetsuko intervene to the point of ruining Anego's chances for romance.
| 7 | "What does my involvement mean if it be only tepid?" "Sanka Suru Koto ni Igi ga Aru Nante Nurui Koto Omotten Janaideshou ne☆no Maki" (参加することに意義があるなんてヌルい事思ってんじゃないでしょうね☆の巻) |
Punie becomes one of the organizers of her school's Sports Festival. Features a kiba-sen (cavalry battle) that parodies several episodes of Japanese history.
| 8 | "It can't always be like it is now, becoming an adult is kinda scary." "Itsumo demo Kodomo no Mamade wa i Rarenai no yo Otonari narutte Nandaka Kowai wa☆no Maki" (いつまでも子供のままではいられないのよ大人になるってなんだかコワいわ☆の巻) |
Pyon and Potaru discover a magic cupcake recipe that bestows upon them the stature and strength of adults. They immediately use their newfound power to attack their older sister, but are once again defeated.
