= Nozomi Masu =

Japanese voice actress

Nozomi Masu (升 望, Masu Nozomi; born July 26, 1980) is a Japanese voice actress from Saitama Prefecture.

== Filmography ==
=== Anime ===
- Desert Punk (Namiko Onami)
- Fushigiboshi no Futagohime (Seed Princesses)
- Fushigiboshi no Futagohime Gyu! (Noche)
- Ga-rei -Zero- (Miku Manabe)
- Girls Bravo (Kosame)
- Hyōka (Sweets Study Group Girl B)
- Kure-nai (Ginko Murakami)
- Lucky Star (Inori Hiiragi)
- Mahoraba Heartful Days (Mizuho Amane)
- Shura no Toki (Shiori/Kisshoumaru)
- The Melody of Oblivion (Maid)
- White Album (Haruka Kawashima; Sakura-Dan member 7 (ep 6))
