= Yū Minamoto =

Japanese manga artist (born 1982)

Yū Minamoto (Japanese: みなもと 悠, Hepburn: Minamoto Yū, born December 15, 1982) is a Japanese manga artist best known for her manga Samurai Harem: Asu no Yoichi which has been serialized in Monthly Shōnen Champion since 2006. Minamoto was formerly assistant to Hekiru Hikawa.

== Works ==
- Asu no Yoichi! (明日のよいち!) (2006, Akita Shoten); English translation: Samurai Harem: Asu no Yoichi (2009, Tokyopop)
- Kanaete Aizen (叶えてアイぜン) (2006)
- Dog Sutairu (DOGスタイル, Dog Style) (2008, Akita Shoten)
