= Samurai Harem: Asu no Yoichi =

Japanese manga series

- First English volume of Samurai Harem: Asu no Yoichi as published by Tokyopop

明日のよいち! (Asu no Yoichi!)
- Genre: Harem, martial arts, romantic comedy
- Manga
- Written by: Yū Minamoto
- Published by: Akita Shoten
- English publisher: NA: Tokyopop
- Magazine: Monthly Shōnen Champion
- Original run: October 6, 2006 – March 8, 2011
- Volumes: 15
- Anime television series
- Directed by: Rion Kujo
- Written by: Hideyuki Kurata
- Music by: Tomoki Kikuya
- Studio: AIC
- Licensed by: NA: Sentai Filmworks; UK: MVM Entertainment
- Original network: TBS, CBC, Sun Television, BS-i
- Original run: January 8, 2009 – March 26, 2009
- Episodes: 12
- icon

Samurai Harem: Asu no Yoichi (明日のよいち!, Asu no Yoichi!; lit. Tomorrow's Yoichi) is a Japanese manga series written and illustrated by Yū Minamoto. It was serialized in Monthly Shōnen Champion from October 2006 to March 2011. The manga is licensed and released in Chinese by Sharp Point Press. The manga was formerly licensed in North America by Tokyopop as Samurai Harem: Asu no Yoichi!.

It has been adapted into an anime television series by AIC and was broadcast in Japan on TBS between January 8, 2009, and March 26, 2009.

== Plot ==
After learning martial arts in the mountains for 17 years under his father's teachings, Yoichi Karasuma's father orders Yoichi to continue his training to strengthen his spirit with the Ikaruga family in the city, as he has nothing left to teach him (but really because Yoichi has become stronger and far more skilled than him). The current assistant head of the Ukiha Divine Wind Style Swordplay school of martial arts in the city, Ibuki Ikaruga, and her siblings gradually accept Yoichi as a freeloader at their dojo. In addition to domestic problems, Yoichi deals with local bad-boy Washizu's jealousy of Ibuki and Yoichi's supposed relationship, his school life and various attempts by other martial arts schools to assassinate him or destroy the Ikaruga dojo.

== Characters ==
From top left to bottom right: Torigaya, Washizu, Angela, Ibuki, Ayame, Tsubasa, Kagome, Yoichi and Chihaya

Yoichi Karasuma (烏丸 与一, Karasuma Yoichi)
Voiced by: Nobuhiko Okamoto
A high school sophomore who is also a young swordsman and has moved away from his mountain life to live with the Ikarugas in the city to continue his training. He is a very active person who actively enjoys martial arts with swordsmanship in particular; he has a catchphrase "de gozaru" after each statement he uses. Due to his early childhood in the mountains with his father, he does not know the current customs in Japan or how to act around a girl. He is very honorable, which is shown when he addresses everyone with the dono (殿; lit. lord/master) honorific. However, due to constant misunderstandings, Ibuki, in particular, constantly attacks him under the assumption that he had done something perverted. He is usually seen wearing a Japanese martial arts uniform and a wooden sword. He is a freeloader at Ikaruga Dojo and is a student of the Ukiha Kamikaze Swordplay (Soaring Wing, Divine Wind Style). He attends the private school Yoku-Ryou Gakuen with Ibuki and Ayame, and he's in the same class as Ibuki and Washizu. He was convinced to join the Acting Club and was initially paired with Ibuki to play the main hero and heroine of a love-play, but Ayame took over Ibuki's role afterwards so she could get closer to Yoichi. He always gets nosebleeds after unintentionally doing or seeing something perverted, usually the latter, but also when Ibuki has hit him with his own sword because of a supposed lecherous act on his part. His training in swordsmanship has left him with greatly advanced fighting skills; one of the key factors in his coming to the city was to earn experience to add to his knowledge (but really, although he doesn't know it, because he had become stronger and better than his father). He is also oblivious to the fact that Ayame, Ibuki, and Angela are in love with him.

=== Ikaruga family ===
Ibuki Ikaruga (斑鳩 いぶき, Ikaruga Ibuki)
Voiced by: Rina Sato
Ibuki is a high school sophomore who became the de facto head of the Ikaruga family after their parents went overseas (in the manga it is explained that this is due to a curse placed on their father and he and their mother are searching for a way to remove it). She is popular at school due to her beauty and scholastic/sports ability; she is President of her class at school and is good at studies, sports and martial arts. She secretly likes Yoichi but is the first to attack him whenever he becomes embroiled in a situation, usually involving other girls, whether he is at fault or not. In the absence of her father she is the Assistant Instructor of Ikaruga Dojo, which teaches Ukiha Kamikaze Swordplay but there are only five students in her dojo due to her violent nature; however, she treats children in a maternal fashion. It is revealed in chapter 19.5 of the manga that her violent nature developed when her parents left Ibuki to look after her siblings at an early age. As the story progresses, after coming to terms with the hardships that fell to her after her parents left, thanks to Yoichi and her sisters, she realizes she is in love with him.

Ayame Ikaruga (斑鳩 あやめ, Ikaruga Ayame)
Voiced by: Haruka Tomatsu
Ayame is a freshman in high school and Ibuki's younger sister. She has a shy, tsundere personality, has a highly-developed sense of fashion and is almost always acutely aware of her small breast size when compared to those of her siblings; a revelation about Kagome's own chest size in Chapter 9 leaves Ayame totally stunned. It took a while for her to come to like Yoichi romantically and she tries to help him at times while protesting that it is for no particular reason. She is bad with household chores in general and dislikes being compared to Ibuki, whom she feels completely overshadows her, to the point where she has decided to not even try to compete with Ibuki; however, Yoichi's arrival and stay with them has caused Ayame to not only try and overcome her self-consciousness and make improvements in her life and outlook but also to become more open about her love for her family (Ibuki herself notes that Yoichi has "given [Ayame] back her smile"). She has kissed Yoichi twice (while he was unconscious during the performance of a school play - the first unintentionally but the second kiss was intentional). Unfortunately, due to a series of misunderstandings, everyone thinks that she and Washizu are becoming a couple, to both her and Washizu's mutual annoyance. Despite her apparent disdain towards kendo, she is quite knowledgeable about the Ukiha Kamikaze style and since Yoichi's ariival has returned to practicing at the Ikaruga dojo (also to be closer to Yoichi), at times acts as an instructor (usually to Washizu, who would prefer that Ibuki be his teacher).

Chihaya Ikaruga (斑鳩 ちはや, Ikaruga Chihaya)
Voiced by: Yukari Tamura
Chihaya is a 15-year-old, 3rd year junior high school student and the second youngest (and most sexually frank) of the Ikaruga family. She is also a professional manga artist who uses her siblings and Yoichi as inspiration for her manga by manipulating events to bring about more satisfying resolutions. She also seems the most knowledgeable of the sisters about relationships as she flirts with Yoichi while poking fun at the others. She is the only person in the Ikaruga family to wear glasses. It is revealed towards the end of the manga that she actually witnessed the incident that caused her parents to leave, but the circumstances were so terrifying that she deliberately blocked out everything. Her signature hair antennae are reminiscent of Naru Narusegawa's from Love Hina.

Kagome Ikaruga (斑鳩 かごめ, Ikaruga Kagome)
Voiced by: Kana Hanazawa
Kagome is the youngest of the Ikaruga family and an elementary school student. She is 10 years old in the anime. Kagome is exceptionally proficient at household chores and cooking, especially for someone her age. While she is generally clumsy at sports and martial arts (much to Ibuki's dismay), she is an excellent swimmer and in Chapter 25 she learns how to successfully do a back-flip for Parents Visitation Day at her school, to the delight of her attending sisters and Yoichi. She has a shy personality and because her breasts are already bigger than Ayame's, she binds them to spare her sister's feelings. She is close friends with Masashi, one of the Ikuraga Dojo's students.

=== Classmates ===
Ryo Washizu (鷲津 涼, Washizu Ryō)
Voiced by: Kazuya Nakai
Washizu (also known as "Wa-san") is Ibuki's classmate and a famous delinquent who originally trained as a boxer and is very good at street fighting. At the beginning of the manga, Washizu was depicted as a loner and the only friend he had was Torigaya; he fought Yoichi twice and was defeated both times (in the second fight, he tried to use a switchblade [in the anime, spiked iron knuckles], but Yoichi shattered it with his bare hands). As the manga progressed, Washizu kept his fearsome reputation but started being friendly to other people around him. Washizu has a crush on Ibuki and joined the classes at the Ikuraga Dojo in order to get closer to her, and because of his misunderstanding of the relationship between Yoichi and Ibuki, he despises Yoichi and sees him as a perverted pimp who plays around with many girls, including Ibuki; however, he occasionally teams up with Yoichi to fight a common enemy. Every attempt on his part to tell or show Ibuki his true feelings somehow ends disastrously, and Instead of confessing his true feelings to her, he accidentally confessed to Ibuki's sister Ayame, and they started acting as a comic relief of the manga. They usually think together how they could get close to their respective love interests: Ibuki for Washizu, Yoichi for Ayame. The "Washizu Fantasy Channel" in the manga and "Washizu Vision" in the anime are all Washizu's misinterpretations of the situation, usually concerning Ibuki; they can also be Washizu's fantasies. In spite of all the misunderstandings and mishaps, Washizu can at times be very understanding and sensitive.

Keita Torigaya (鳥谷 恵太, Torigaya Keita)
Voiced by: Shintaro Asanuma
Torigaya is Washizu's only friend until Washizu started opening himself to other people. She usually acts cocky and arrogant when she is with Washizu and is very fond of children. Both in the anime and manga she started looking like a male, but chapter after chapter she apparently shrinks in size and shows more feminine traits. In the anime, her actual gender is suddenly revealed in the last chapter, while in the manga the change is much more gradual, having the first hint towards her actual gender when she dresses as a maid in chapter 37. This change seems to be noticed only by Washizu.

=== Tsubame Benten Ryuu Dojo ===
Tsubasa Tsubame (燕 つばさ, Tsubame Tsubasa)
Voiced by: Yui Makino
Tsubasa is the next heir of the Tsubame Tenryu Ryouge, a martial arts school threatening to collapse due to lack of funds, and was originally hired by Ukyou Sakinomiya to assassinate Yoichi. She is a clumsy and shy girl who dreams of having a normal life. She insisted to her subordinate Angela that she should go to the same school as Yoichi so she would have a good opportunity to assassinate him, although her true motive was to be a normal high school girl. In one incident, she instinctively slices a soccer ball heading towards her in front of her classmates and becomes depressed when everyone is awed by her. Yoichi then compliments her abilities and Ibuki chastises everyone else for being too inquisitive, which eases the tension of the scene. She later develops a crush on Washizu because he was the first person to treat her normally (even though she considers Yoichi to be her first friend due to his actions in the soccer ball incident), but she is hurt deeply after hearing Washizu saying that he hates martial arts. After school, Angela ripped Tsubasa's clothes off in public, causing her to turn into a deadly martial artist in a trance-like state due to her embarrassment and attacks Yoichi at Angela's orders. However, when Washizu interrupted their fight, Tsubasa broke out of her trance and fled the scene crying in humiliation. Later, she told Angela that she hates both martial arts and Angela. Later that evening, she forgives Angela and the following day they start working at a ramen shop together. Later on, Yoichi convinces her to return to her family and explain her feelings to them, especially her wish not to become the heir; after they accept her decision, she happily returns with Angela to her life and friends in the city. Like Washizu, she has her own version of the Washizu Fantasy Channel/Washizu Vision called the Tsubame Fantasy Channel ("Tsubame Vision" in the anime). Her full name translates to "Sparrow's Wings" or "Wings of a Sparrow" in Western order.

Angela Takatsukasa (鷹司 アンジェラ, Takatsukasa Anjera)
Voiced by: Hitomi Nabatame
Angela is a 16-year-old girl (in the anime she seems older) and Tsubasa's subordinate, who Yoichi describes as being "as tall as a model with a dynamic body". Angela was hired by Ukyou Sakinomiya to assassinate Yoichi and she has been observing Tsubasa because she thought that the next heir of Tsubame Tenryu Ryouge should assassinate Yoichi. After she witnesses Tsubasa's lack of interest in proceeding with the job, she ripped off Tsubasa's clothes so she would turn into a deadly weapon, but the fight between Tsubasa and Yoichi was interrupted by Washizu. After Tsubasa left because of the embarrassment, Angela followed her and was in deep shock after hearing Tsubasa say that she hates both martial arts and Angela. She then attempted to assassinate Yoichi that night by herself. In the manga she was scared by Ibuki's sisters whom she mistook for ghosts. After she reached Yoichi's room, she attempted to assassinate him, but thanks to his intense training (which included staying on guard even during sleep) Yoichi avoided all of her attacks even while fast asleep. Angela was taken off guard and was sexually harassed by Yoichi while he was still sleeping, but was saved by Ibuki and her sisters. After Yoichi woke up, she explained everything to the Ikarugas about the assassination plot and her assassination attempt (this happened in the manga). Yoichi lectured her about her mercenary ways and that she should use her martial art skills with pride as a member of the Tsubame Tenryu Ryouge as well for the revival of her martial arts school. In the anime, there are no ghosts and her attack occurs outdoors, but it also ends with Yoichi foiling the attack and lecturing her. Afterwards, in both versions, she leaves the dojo and encounters Tsubasa, who has already forgiven Angela for her previous actions. The following day, Yoichi and Ibuki find that Angela and Tsubasa are working at a ramen shop, determined to revive their style on their own merits. In the manga, Angela grows to like Yoichi romantically but struggles on how to deal with her feelings because she is torn between them and her duty to the Tsubame Tenryu Ryouge. The first kanji in her family name means "hawk" (鷹, taka), in referenced to her watchful nature towards Tsubasa and the finger talons she uses as weapons.

Embi "Envy" Tsubame
The younger sister of Tsubasa.

Lucifelle "Lucy" Takatsukasa
Lucifelle is Angela's older sister and acts as Enbi's bodyguard. She is seen to respect Yoichi's martial arts skills and convinces Tsubasa to return to the Tsubame Benten Ryuu with Yoichi's help. In terms of skill, she is shown to be much stronger than Angela. Like Angela, Lucifelle is often seen wearing a cheongsam.

=== Saginomiya clan ===
Ukyo Saginomiya (鷺ノ宮 右京, Saginomiya Ukyō)
Voiced by: Katsuyuki Konishi
Ukyo is the head of the Saginomiya clan and the head of the Heron's Temple, Azure Sky School. He has a crush on Ibuki (caused by various misunderstandings between him and Ibuki from when they first met as children) and originally attempted to kill Yoichi and later kidnap Ibuki. While he has become less obsessed that he used to be, his one-sided passion for Ibuki remains unabated, causing him to create a robot version of Ibuki, but he can also be very understanding; when Ibuki is defeated by Nuezume Aruko in Chapter 36 and loses both the Ikaruga dojo and her family, Ukyo trains with her to help her regain her self-confidence. He now has great respect for Yoichi (who defeated him in their first encounter) both as a warrior and as a person. After his defeat by Yoichi, He is followed and helped by his younger sister, Sakon.

Sakon Saginomiya
Voiced by: Sayuri Yahagi
She faithfully follows her older brother around, and is very skilled in the arts of Disguise and "her skills with herbs are top notch." She disguised herself as a little old lady and later as Ayame, although her "boobs were too big" to make the latter disguise believable.

=== Others ===
Yoichi's father
The current head of the Karasuma Ukiha Kamikaze Style. He was the one that sent Yoichi to the Ikaruga Dojo claiming that a Samurai needs to be strong at heart as well (in reality it is because Yoichi has greatly surpassed him).

Mr. and Mrs. Ikaruga
The parents of Ibuki, Ayame, Chihaya and Kagome. They left the family for martial arts training, but in reality it is because their father received a curse placed on him to kill his own children so they left in order to find a way to remove the curse.

== Media ==
=== Manga ===
Written and illustrated by Yū Minamoto, Asu no Yoichi! has been serialized in Monthly Shōnen Champion since it premiered in the October 2006 issue. The individual chapters are collected into 15 tankōbon volumes by Akita Shoten, which published the volumes between October 6, 2006, and March 8, 2011. The manga was formerly licensed in North America by Tokyopop as Samurai Harem: Asu no Yoichi!. The manga is licensed in Taiwan by Sharp Point Press and in France by Kazé as High School Samurai: Asu no Yoichi!.

In August 2026, the ninth issue of Akita Shoten's Young Champion Retsu published a one-shot of the series to celebrate the series 20-year anniversary.

=== Anime ===
An anime adaptation began production on August 6, 2008. The first episode premiered on TBS on January 8, 2009, on Sun Television on January 25, 2009, and on Chubu-Nippon Broadcasting and BS-i on January 29, 2009. On February 26, 2010, Section23 Films announced that Sentai Filmworks had licensed the series for home video in North America and it was later released on DVD, on May 11, 2010.

The anime ran for 12 episodes.

The series used two pieces of theme music. "Egao no Riyuu" (笑顔の理由) by Meg Rock was used for the opening theme, while "Life and proud" by Aki Misato was the series' ending theme.

=== Internet radio show ===
An Internet radio show to promote the anime series called Asu no Yoichi Radio! (明日のよいちらじを!, Asu no Yoichi Rajio!) was streamed online every Friday and aired 42 episodes until September 25, 2009, hosted by Lantis website. It had two hosts — Nobuhiko Okamoto and Rina Satō who played the voices of Yoichi Karasuma and Ibuki Irukaga respectively in the anime series.

=== Soundtracks ===
On January 21, 2009, Geneon released a single for Asu no Yoichi!'s opening theme, "Egao no Riyuu" (笑顔の理由) by Meg Rock. On February 4, 2009, Geneon released a single for Asu no Yoichi!'s ending theme, "Life and proud" by Aki Misato.

Geneon released four character song CDs for Asu no Yoichi!. The first two CDs were composed by Miki Fujisue and released on February 25, 2009. The first CD, character song for Ibuki Ikaruga, is sung by Rina Sato. The second CD, character song for Ayame Ikaruga, is sung by Haruka Tomatsu. On March 25, 2009, Geneon released the last two character CDs, both composed by Masumi Ito. The third character CD, character song for Chihaya Ikaruga, is sung by Yukari Tamura. The fourth and final CD, character song for Kagome Ikaruga, is sung by Kana Hanazawa.

== Reception ==
The eighth volume of Asu no Yoichi! was ranked 26th on the Tohan charts between December 9 and 15, 2008. The tenth volume of Asu no Yoichi! was ranked 12th on the Tohan charts between July 6–12, 2009. The eleventh volume of Asu no Yoichi! was ranked 30th on the Tohan charts between November 2–8, 2009. Coolstreak Comics' Leroy Douresseaux commends the manga by saying, "While it offers plenty of cleavage and panty shots, Samurai Harem is more than just a fanservice manga. It’s also an energetic romantic comedy, made all the nicer by the fact that each of the four sisters has a distinct personality". A later review by Douresseaux comments that the manga "mostly avoids the martial aspects of having samurai and ninja populating a manga series. So far, this series avoids the action, but does have plenty of comedy." Comics Worth Reading's Ed Sizemore criticises the manga's "focusing on the pubic region of girls and women" and "sound effect coming from the girl’s genitalia" as "shameless in its tastelessness" as well as "disturbing". Pop Culture Shock's Ken Haley criticises the manga's art as "bland" but concedes the point that "it does a good job at depicting scantily clad underage girls in compromising positions."

The third DVD of Asu no Yoichi! was listed on the Oricon charts between May 18 and 24, 2009. THEM Anime Review's Tim Jones likens Yoichi and Ibuki with Tom and Jerry respectively from Tom and Jerry "where Tom always lost against Jerry". Jones compares Yoichi's love rival, Ryo Washizu, as "a mishmash of Kuno and Ryoga from Ranma ½". He's part Ryoga in that he wants to trump Yoichi even if it means training himself to the bone, and part Kuno in that he's an idiot when it comes to women (especially around Ibuki, who he constantly fantasizes of, as well as worries that she'll hate him for something inane that happens to him)." Jones criticises the art with "often drab, uncreative scenery, and the animation is only adequate save for a few fight sequences". He also comments that "the character designs are cute, but the Ikaruga sisters' hair and outfits (save Ayame's) look ridiculous." He also criticises the background music as "entirely forgettable", and the "opening & closing songs won't be staying in your head anytime soon".
