= Binchōtan =

Japanese charcoal

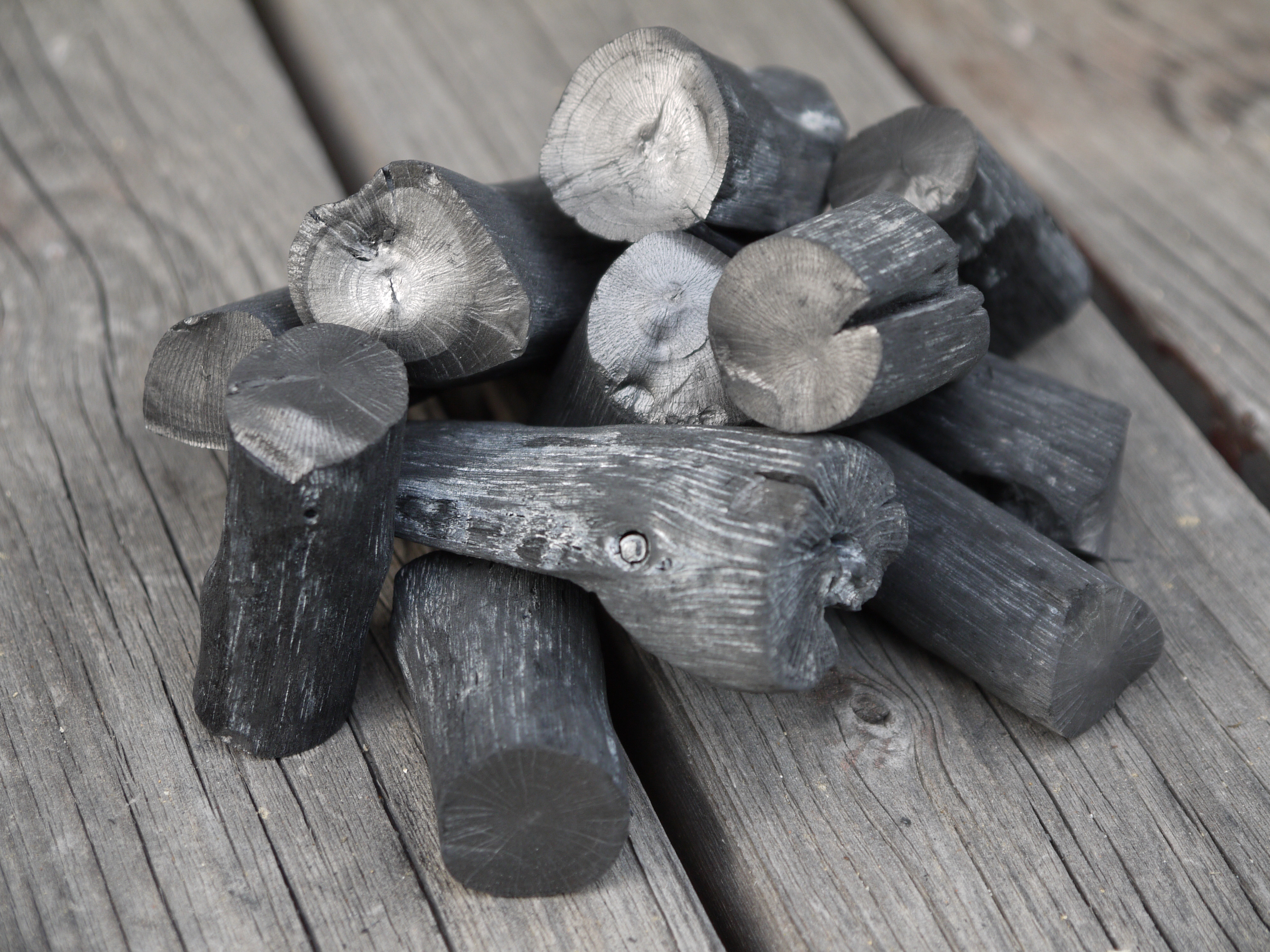
Binchō-tan, or white charcoal

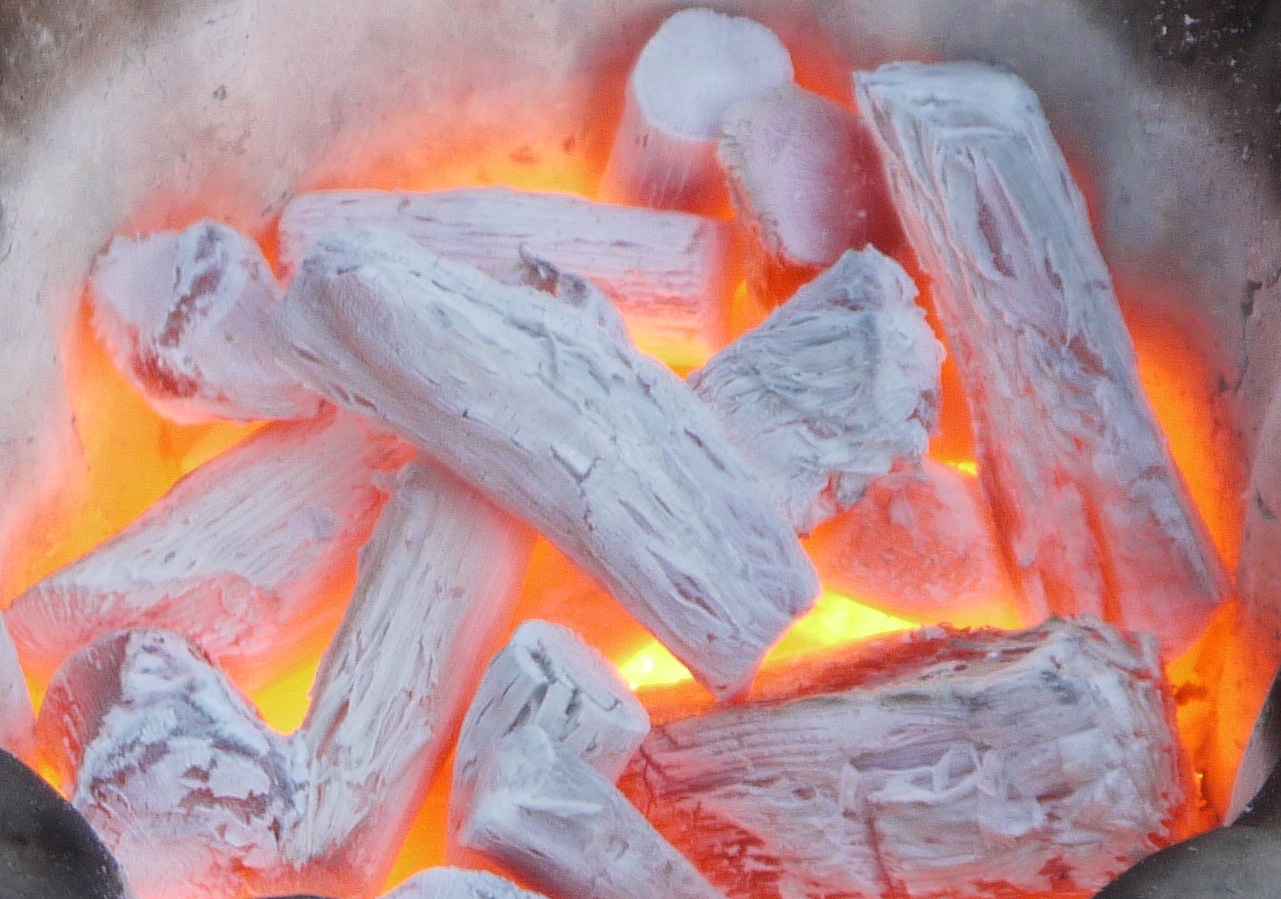
Burning binchō-tan

Binchō-tan (Japanese: 備長炭, [biɲtɕoꜜːtaɴ]), also called white charcoal or binchō-zumi, is a type of high-quality charcoal traditionally used in Japanese cooking. Its use dates back to the Edo period when during the Genroku era, a craftsman named Bichū-ya Chōzaemon (備中屋 長左衛門) began to produce it in Tanabe, Wakayama. The typical raw material used to make binchō-tan in Japan is oak, specifically ubame oak, now the official tree of Wakayama Prefecture. Wakayama continues to be a major producer of high-quality charcoal, with the town of Minabe, Wakayama, producing more binchō-tan than any other town in Japan. Binchō-tan produced in Wakayama is referred to as Kishū binchō-tan (紀州備長炭), Kishū being the old name of Wakayama.

White charcoal is made by pyrolyzing wood in a kiln at approximately 240 °C (464 °F) for 120 hours, then raising the temperature to around 1,000 °C (1,830 °F). Once carbonized, the material is taken out and covered to cure in a damp mixture of earth, sand, and ash.

Binchō-tan is a type of hardwood charcoal which takes the natural shape of the wood that was used to make it. It is also harder than black charcoal, ringing with a metallic sound when struck. Due to its physical structure, binchō-tan takes on a whiter or even metallic appearance. Apart from being used for cooking, it has other benefits, such as absorption of odors.

== Kishū Binchō-tan ==
Kishū Binchō-tan is the charcoal from which Binchō-tan originated, produced in Wakayama Prefecture, Japan, particularly in the central region, including Hidakagawa Town. To preserve its quality and traditional production methods, Wakayama Prefecture designated the techniques for producing Kishū Binchō-tan as an intangible folk cultural property on April 9, 1974.

However, as the definition of binchō-tan broadened and lower-quality or counterfeit products became more common, charcoal produced in Wakayama began to be specifically called Kishū Binchō-tan to distinguish it and maintain its quality and tradition. On October 27, 2006, Kishū Binchō-tan became the first regional brand certified under Japan's Regional Collective Trademark system.

The raw material used is typically ubame oak (Quercus phillyreoides), which grows in mixed mesophytic forests and is commonly found in Japanese gardens. Wakayama continues to be a major producer of high-quality binchō-tan, which is highly regarded both domestically and internationally.

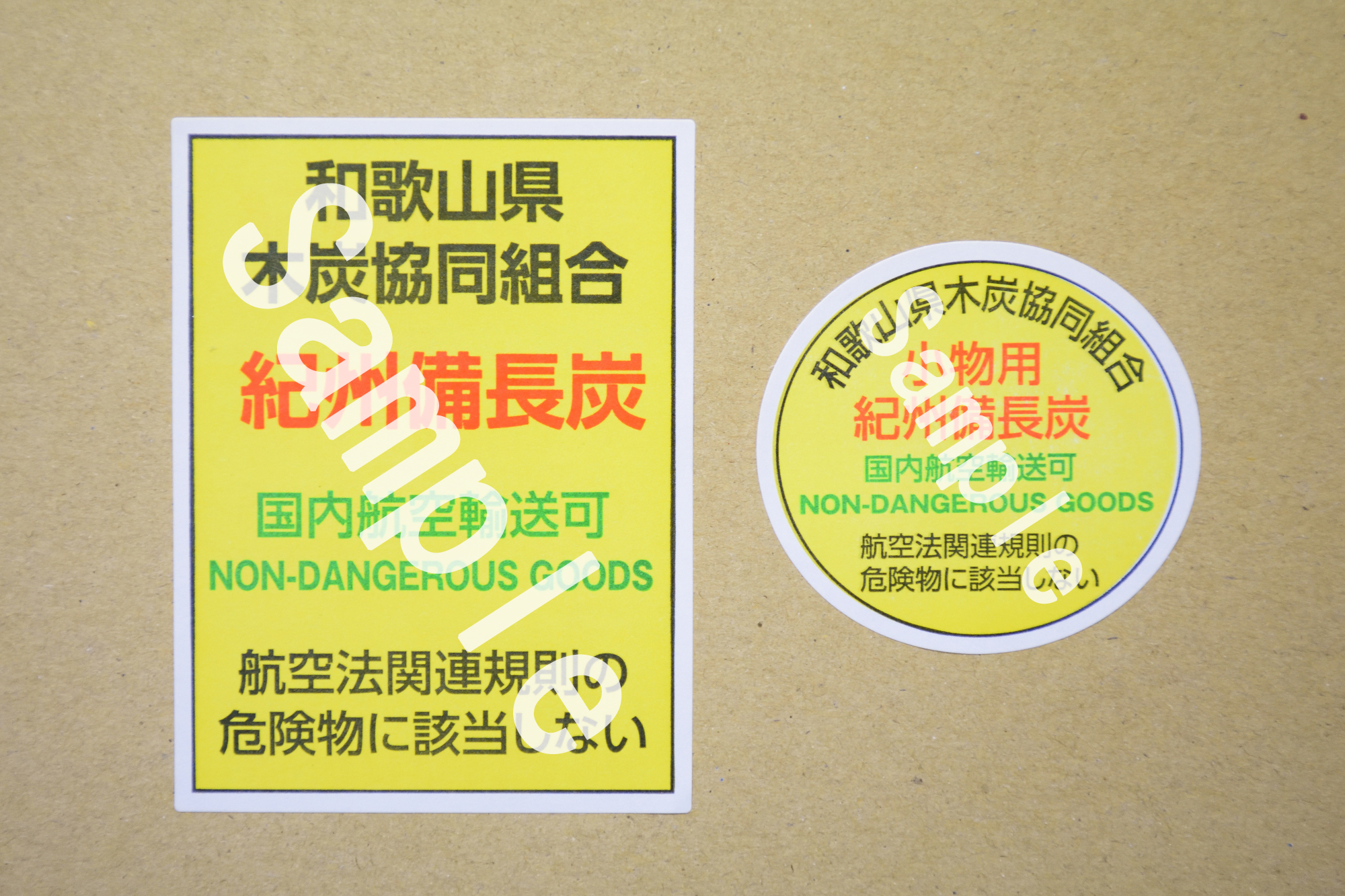
Kishū Binchō-tan Air Transport Label

Although charcoal is generally classified as hazardous and its transport or carriage on aircraft is restricted, Kishū Binchō-tan bearing the yellow “Kishū Binchō-tan” label issued by the Wakayama Prefectural Charcoal Cooperative and marked “NON-DANGEROUS GOODS” is exceptionally allowed for air transport. Japan Airlines permits the carriage of such certified Kishū Binchō-tan on domestic flights, while the policies of other airlines remain unclear. This label also serves as a certification of the product’s authenticity.
